= Contraband Bayou =

Large bayou in Louisiana, United States

Coordinates: 30.2088°N 93.2509°W

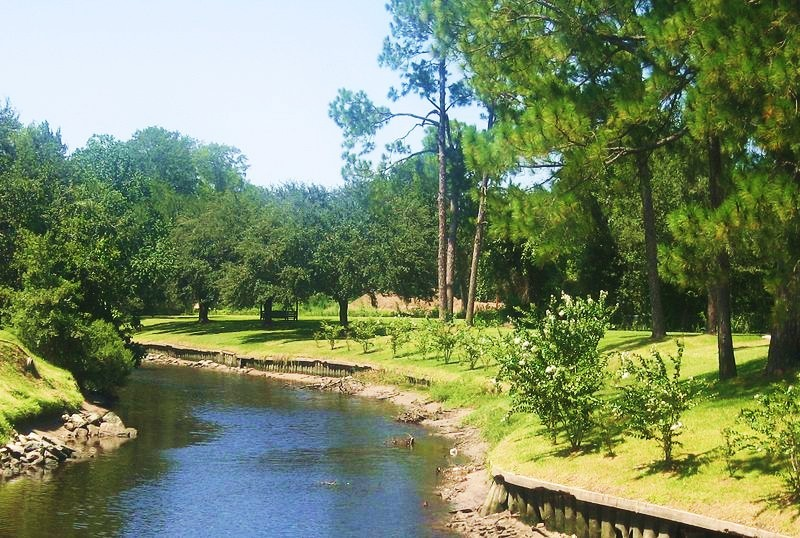
Contraband Bayou as it runs west of the McNeese State University campus.

Contraband Bayou is a large bayou, a tributary of the Calcasieu River. It runs through Lake Charles, Louisiana, and empties into Prien Lake.

The bayou is so named because of the legendary pirate Jean Lafitte, who built a slave barracks on the bayou in the early 1800s and reputedly hid his contraband somewhere along the shores of the bayou.

The bayou is moderately saline, with low flow, and receives Lake Charles municipal waste discharge. Over the years, it has been dredged and channelized along part of its length. While the bayou was once lined with many cypress trees, the saltwater brought in during this dredging caused some to die off, leaving behind stumps in the water.

The bayou runs through the McNeese State University campus. L'Auberge du Lac Resort is located near the mouth of the bayou, and the resort's Contraband Bayou Golf Club is named for it. Part of the city docks of the Port of Lake Charles are also located near the bayou.
