= Prien =

Prien may refer to:

- Prien am Chiemsee, a municipality in Bavaria, Germany
- Prien (river), a river of Bavaria, Germany
- Prien, Louisiana, a place in Louisiana, United States
- Prien Lake, a lake in Calcasieu Parish, Louisiana
- Günther Prien (1908–1941), German U-Boat captain from World War Two
- Karin Prien (born 1965), German lawyer and politician
