= Charles Sallier =

Charles Anselm Sallier was an early settler in Lake Charles, Louisiana, and the namesake of that city.

Martin and Dela LeBleu were among the first to settle near Lake Charles, in the area called LeBleu Settlement. They arrived in Lake Charles in 1781 from Bordeaux, France, and settled approximately six miles east of present-day Lake Charles, Louisiana. Soon after, many immigrants began arriving in the area to settle. Among them was Charles Sallier.

Charles Sallier moved to Lake Charles and married the LeBleus' daughter, Catherine. They settled near Lake Charles (the lake) and had six children. As legend tells it, one day Charles Sallier thought that Catherine was having an affair with the famous pirate Jean Lafitte. In rage, he shot at his wife and assumed she was dead. In guilt and regret, Charles ran off. However, Catherine had survived the shot by only a simple piece of jewelry – her brooch. It is rumored that Catherine's brother, Arsene, and Lafitte gave chase to Sallier, and he was never heard from again.

She continued her life raising the six children in Lake Charles. Soon after, Lake Charles residents began calling the area "Charlie's Lake," and by the late 19th century, the area where Charles Sallier once lived was called "Charleston," or "Charles Town." Eventually it became known as "Lake Charles."
