= Prien Lake Mall =

Shopping mall in Louisiana

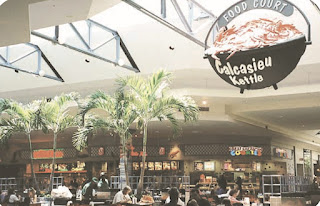
- Location: Lake Charles, Louisiana, United States
- Coordinates: 30.20027°N 93.22643°W
- Opened: 13 April 1972; 54 years ago
- Developer: Melvin Simon & Associates
- Owner: Simon Property Group
- Num. of stores: 86
- Num. of anchor tenants: 9 (8 open, 1 vacant)
- Floor area: 848,263 square feet (78,806.2 m^{2})
- Floors: 1 (2 in Dillard's and former Sears)
- Website: www.simon.com/prien-lake-mall

Prien Lake Mall is an enclosed, regional shopping mall in Lake Charles, Louisiana which serves 344,268 people. It is located on West Prien Lake Road and is highly visible from Interstate 210.

The mall is named after Prien Lake, which is one of the lakes in the city of Lake Charles. When it opened in 1972 with 35 stores, many retailers from downtown Lake Charles relocated to the mall leading to urban blight in the downtown area. The anchor store on opening was Montgomery Ward. The mall was extended with a new wing opening in 1998, increasing floorspace to 800,000 sq. ft. including a new food court and Sears store, which closed in 2018.

In 2001, an Educational Resource Centre was approved for opening in the mall with federal funding from the US Department of Education's Community Technology Centers Program. It provides adult education and English classes. In that same year, Houston-based Foley's came to the mall with a new store built, only to rebrand as Macy's five years later. Macy's only lasted at the mall for a year until it closed in early 2008. By 2009, Kohl's replaced the former Macy's building. The anchor stores are Dillard's, Dick's Sporting Goods, Kohl's, JCPenney, TJ Maxx, HomeGoods, and Cinemark Theatres.

The mall has been owned by Simon Property Group since its construction.

Retailers include Aéropostale, Bath & Body Works, American Eagle, and Buckle. Cinemark Theatre provides stadium seating and uses digital technology.
