= Israel LaFleur Bridge =

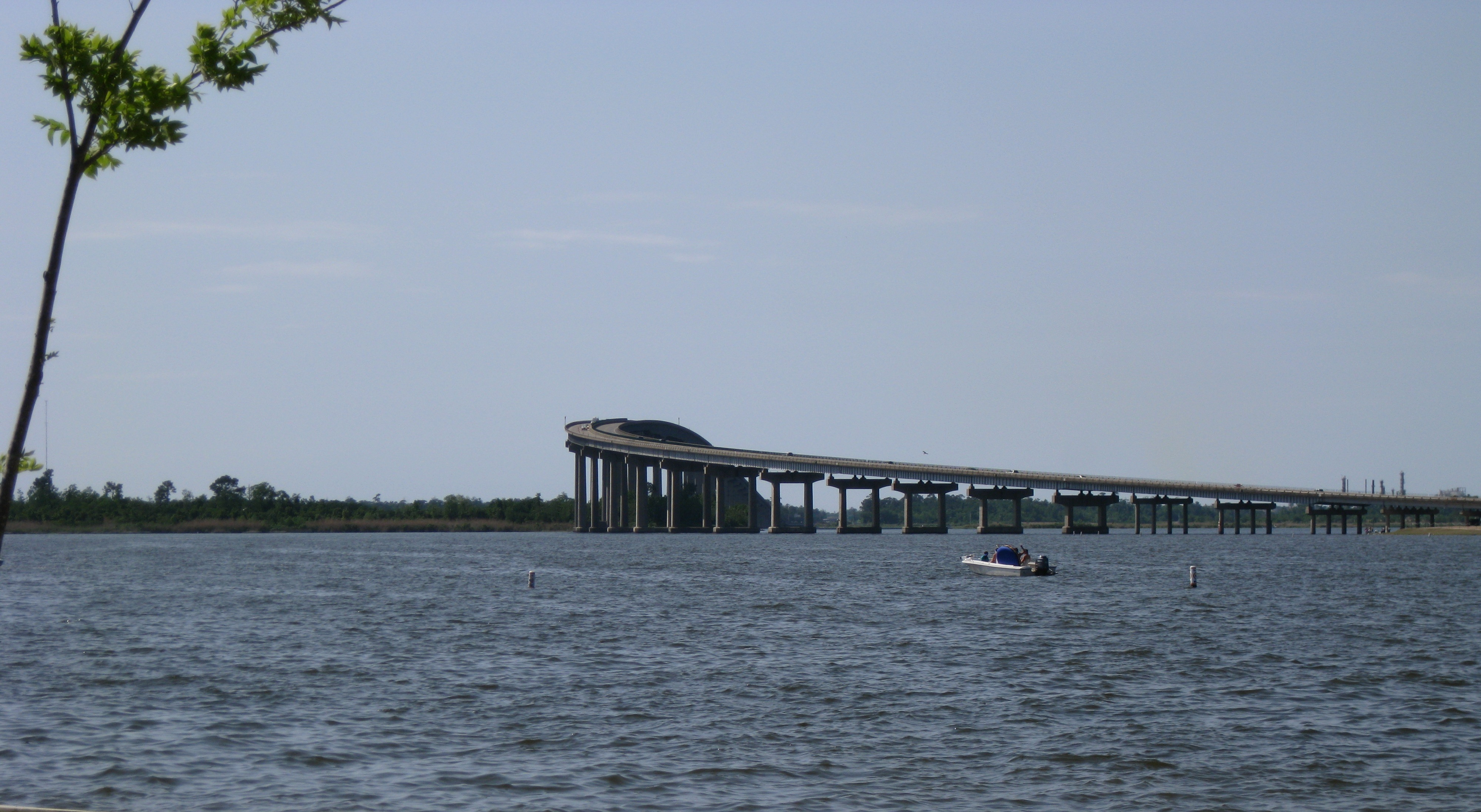
- Spanning Calcasieu Ship Channel and Prien Lake
- Coordinates: 30°12′06″N 93°16′49″W
- Carries: 4 lanes of I-210
- Crosses: Calcasieu Ship Channel
- Locale: Lake Charles, Louisiana
- Official name: Israel LaFleur Bridge
- Other name: I-210 Bridge
- Maintained by: LDOT

Characteristics
- Design: Box girder
- Total length: 8,500.4 feet (2,590.9 m)
- Width: 56.4 feet (17.2 m)
- Longest span: 450.2 feet (137.2 m)
- Clearance below: 140 feet (43 m)

History
- Opened: 1962

Statistics
- Toll: Free both ways

Location
- Interactive map of Israel LaFleur Bridge

The Israel LaFleur Bridge is a concrete pillar vehicular bridge located in the city of Lake Charles, Louisiana. The bridge was built in 1962 as part of Interstate 210 (Lake Charles Loop; a highway expansion that travels over the Calcasieu River, south of Lake Charles, and back up to Interstate 10). It is named after Israel LaFleur, who spearheaded the project to build it.

At over 140 feet (43 m) high, it is one of the tallest structures in southwest Louisiana.

The bridge survived the fourth-most intense Atlantic hurricane ever recorded and the most intense tropical cyclone ever observed in the Gulf of Mexico, Hurricane Rita. The bridge's structural rating is 96%, even after surviving two major hurricanes and being sixty years old.
