= Prien, Louisiana =

- Census-designated place
- Location of Prien in Louisiana
- Coordinates: 30°09′03″N 93°15′20″W
- Country: United States
- State: Louisiana
- Parish: Calcasieu

Area
  - Total: 5.98 sq mi (15.48 km^{2})
  - Land: 5.34 sq mi (13.84 km^{2})
  - Water: 0.63 sq mi (1.64 km^{2})
- Elevation: 10 ft (3.0 m)

Population (2020)
  - Total: 7,745
  - Density: 1,449.4/sq mi (559.62/km^{2})
- Time zone: UTC-6 (CST)
  - Summer (DST): UTC-5 (CDT)
- Area code: 337
- FIPS code: 22-62647
- GNIS feature ID: 2403447

Prien is an unincorporated community and census-designated place (CDP) in Calcasieu Parish, Louisiana, United States. As of the 2020 census, Prien had a population of 7,745. It is part of the Lake Charles metropolitan statistical area. Some of the area has been annexed into the city of Lake Charles.

== Geography ==
Prien consists of unincorporated land on the south side of Lake Charles. The original community of Prien is located on the southeast shore of Prien Lake, a widening in the Calcasieu River, but the CDP now extends south as far as West Gauthier Road.

According to the United States Census Bureau, the CDP has a total area of 6.6 square miles (17.2 km^{2}), of which 6.0 square miles (15.6 km^{2}) is land and 0.62 square miles (1.6 km^{2}), or 9.32%, is water. The area of the CDP has decreased by 1.3 square miles (3.4 km^{2}) since the 2000 census, due to annexation of certain neighborhoods by the city of Lake Charles.

== Demographics ==
Historical population
Census	Pop.	Note	%±
1980	6,224		—
1990	6,448		3.6%
2000	7,215		11.9%
2010	7,810		8.2%
2020	7,745		−0.8%
U.S. Decennial Census; 1950 1960 1970 1980; 1990 2000 2010

Prien first appeared as a census designated place the 1980 U.S. census.

Prien racial composition as of 2020
Race	Number	Percentage
White (non-Hispanic)	5,942	76.72%
Black or African American (non-Hispanic)	627	8.1%
Native American	32	0.41%
Asian	355	4.58%
Pacific Islander	12	0.15%
Other/Mixed	305	3.94%
Hispanic or Latino	472	6.09%

As of the 2020 United States census, there were 7,745 people, 2,999 households, and 2,284 families residing in the CDP.

== Education ==
Calcasieu Parish School Board is the school district for the entire parish.
