= Port of Panama City =

- Interactive map of Port of Panama City
- Location within the United States

Location
- Country: United States
- Location: Panama City, Florida
- Coordinates: 30°11′00″N 85°44′00″W
- UN/LOCODE: USPFN

Details
- Operated by: Panama City Port Authority
- Owned by: City of Panama City
- Type of Harbor: Cargo
- No. of berths: 5
- Draft depth: 32 ft.

Statistics
- Website; Port of Panama City

The Port of Panama City is a port on the Gulf Intracoastal Waterway in Panama City, Florida. The port is overseen by the Port Authority of Panama City, which was initiated in 1945.

== History ==
The deed for the land of the Port Panama City was conducted for Panama City Shipbuilding Corporation on January 21, 1939. The land was known as the Wainwright Shipyard because of the high production of ships and tankers created for World War II from July 1942 to 1945. At the time, the shipyard had 18,000 to 30,000 workers who created 102 liberty ships and 6 tankers. By 1945, the Panama City Port Authority was created, which helped the government convert the shipyard into a dismantling area for ships for scrap.

During the 1950s, the port authority started granting leasing areas for industrial development. The dismantling process the government granted continued into the mid-1960s, when the city bought the land from the government in order to expand the industrial development for the port authority. Formal operations for the current port were developed in 1967 with the creation of a deepwater berth - a pierspace capable of accommodating a Panamax sized ship. Further developments included warehouses, cargo equipment, and tenant bases, which helped the port expand.

In 2018, the port sustained significant damage from Hurricane Michael, with Port Authority warehouses and infrastructure affected across multiple facilities. Recovery efforts were subsequently undertaken to restore port operations in the years following the storm.

On January 29th 2026, Panama's Supreme Court annulled contracts held by Panama Ports Company, (PPC) a subsidiary of Hong Kong-based CK Hutchison.
