= Lake Charles Transit =

Public transit operator

- Headquarters: 4331 E. Broad St.
- Locale: Lake Charles, Louisiana
- Service area: Calcasieu Parish, Louisiana
- Service type: bus service
- Routes: 5
- Website: Transit

Lake Charles Transit is the operator of public transportation in Lake Charles, Calcasieu Parish, Louisiana. Five routes operate 5 days per week, each consisting of an approximately 55 minute journey in full. All routes depart from the city's downtown bus terminal.

== History ==
Lake Charles Transit System (LCTS) was established in 1969. Work to rebuild the Customer Service Center began in September 2011, and the new building was opened in December 2012.

== Route list ==
- 1 Downtown-Ryan & Kirkman
- 2 Downtown-Simmons & Hwy 171
- 3 Downtown-Broad & Legion
- 4 Downtown-5th & Hwy 171
- 5 Prien Lake Mall & Nelson
