= John McNeese =

American educator

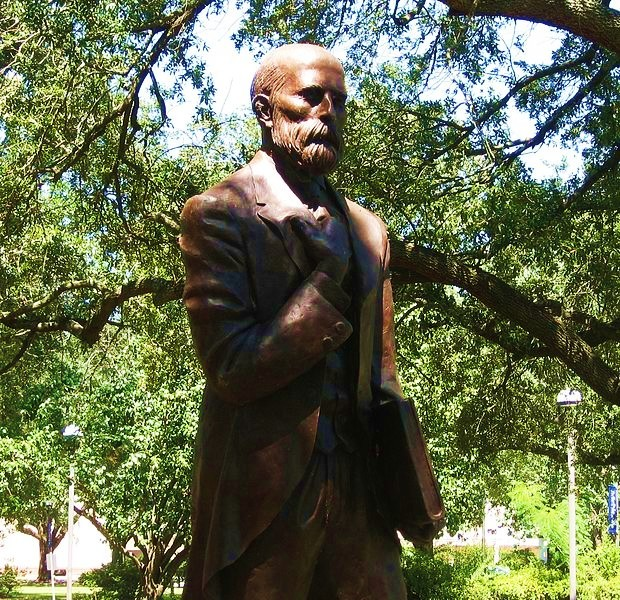
- Statue of McNeese at McNeese State University
- Born: July 4, 1843; New York City, U.S.
- Died: June 5, 1914 (aged 70); Lake Charles, Louisiana, U.S.
- Occupation: School superintendent of Imperial Calcasieu Parish (1888–1913)

John McNeese (July 4, 1843 – June 5, 1914) was an educator in Lake Charles, Louisiana, and the first superintendent of schools of Imperial Calcasieu Parish. McNeese State University in Lake Charles is named in his honor.

== Biography ==
McNeese was born on July 4, 1843, in New York City to Scottish-American parents, who died of tuberculosis when he was nine. He lived with the family of Dr. Nathaniel Stafford in Baltimore until joining the Union Army in 1861 during the Civil War.

Afterward, McNeese moved to Menard County, Texas, where he became a businessman and rancher. He also served as the county's clerk from 1871 to 1873. In 1873, McNeese began a cattle drive to New Orleans, but due to a drought and the Panic of 1873, he was forced to end the drive after reaching the Sabine River. He sold his cattle and settled in Oberlin. McNeese married Susan Bilbo in 1876; the couple had nine children, seven of whom survived infancy.

In 1887, McNeese earned his law degree from Tulane University in New Orleans. The next year, he was hired as the first Superintendent of Schools of Imperial Calcasieu Parish. As superintendent, McNeese advanced education in the parish; he pioneered the concept of using taxes to fund parish schools, supported consolidated schools in rural areas, and advocated supervision of rural schools in the parish. McNeese retired in 1913, and died a year later on June 5, 1914.

In 1940, Lake Charles Junior College changed its name to John McNeese Junior College to recognize McNeese. The institution developed a four-year curriculum and graduate programs and is now established as McNeese State University, part of the state system.
