= Lake Charles (Louisiana) =

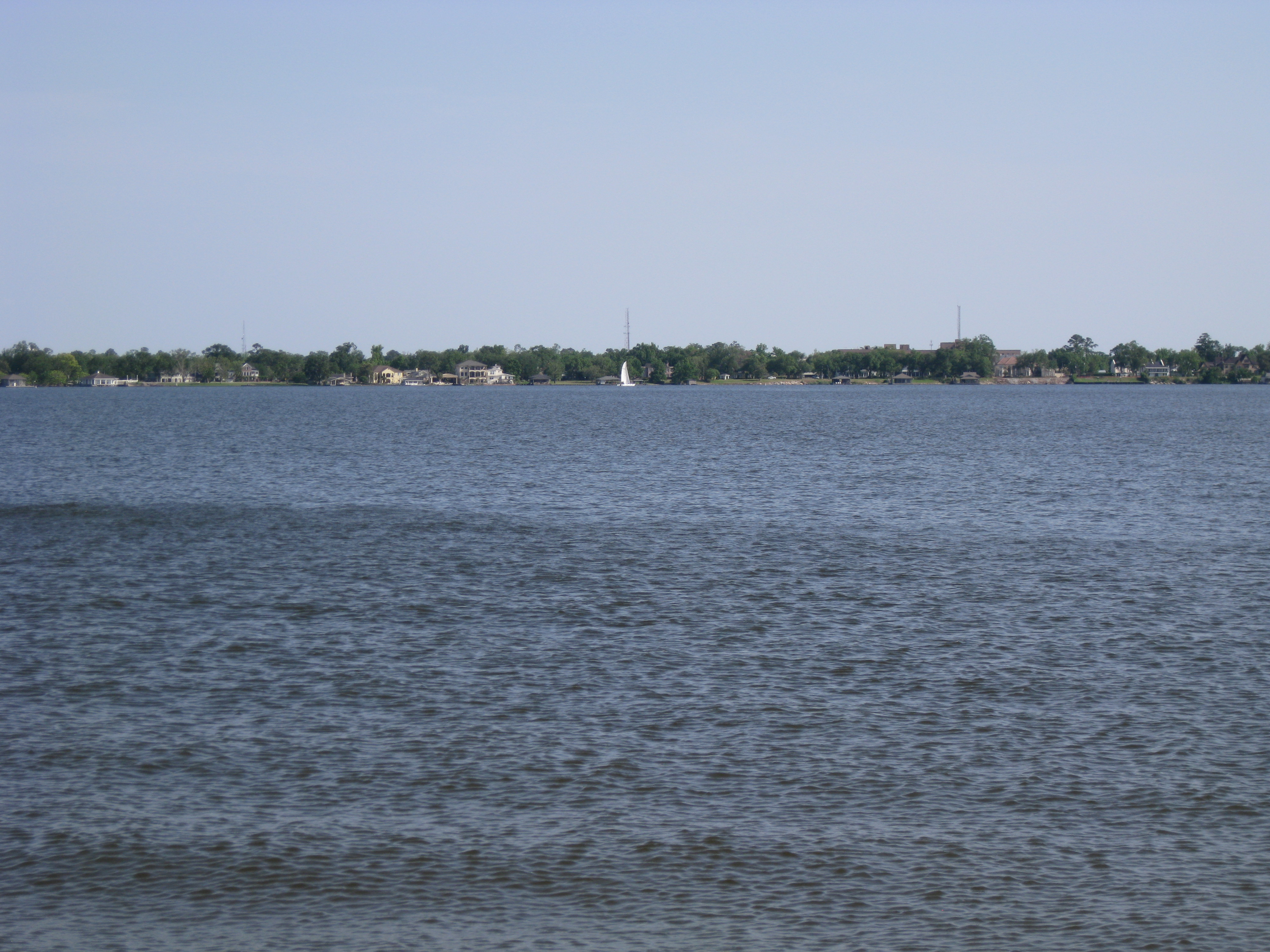
- Lake Charles from North Beach along Interstate 10

- Location within Louisiana Location within the United States
- Location: Calcasieu Parish, Louisiana, United States
- Coordinates: 30°13′46″N 093°14′05″W
- Type: Brackish, estuary
- Primary inflows: Calcasieu River
- Basin countries: United States
- Average depth: 5 ft (1.5 m)
- Surface elevation: 0 ft (0 m)
- Settlements: City of Lake Charles

Lake Charles (French: Lac Charles) is a brackish body of water located within the estuary of the Calcasieu River in Southwest Louisiana, United States. It is situated almost entirely within the Lake Charles city limits. The Calcasieu Ship Channel flows along the western side for large ships to pass and is the western boundary of the city limits. The I-10 Calcasieu River Bridge crosses at the extreme northwestern edge of the lake and river and connects the city of Lake Charles and the city of Westlake.

== Contamination ==
The lake and Calcasieu estuary has been embroiled in controversy since the 1994 Condea Vista ethylene dichloride pipeline spill. The spill, according to the web site Axiom Amnesia was estimated between 19 and 47 million pounds and is considered "one of the largest in U.S. History". The affected part of the estuary includes (but is not limited to) the Calcasieu River from northern Moss Lake up to the salt water barrier, that is north of both the existing bridge and any realigned new bridge in Lake Charles. The affected area includes Bayou d'Inde, Bayou Verdine, dredged spoil islands, and Clooney and Coon Island Loop.

The spill has brought about lawsuits from individuals plaintiffs (500 of them), with some settlements accepted amounting to $50 million, stories of corporate espionage, and a lawsuit between ConocoPhillips and Sasol North America, the Department of Justice, the Environmental Protection Agency and the United States Attorney with federal trustee's being the National Oceanic and Atmospheric Administration (NOAA), the Department of the Interior (DOI), the Louisiana Department of Environmental Quality (LDEQ), and the Louisiana Department of Wildlife and Fisheries (LDWF) that amounts to almost $15 million.

== Calcasieu River Bridge ==
The I-10 bridge has been part of a controversy since 2002 concerning bridge safety issues and replacement with a detailed report that provided planning for a new bridge and corridor improvements. As of 2015 there have been some corridor improvements but any new bridge is not in the near foreseeable future. An Environmental Impact Statement (EIS) was started in 2013, a draft was completed during the summer of 2015, and a final EIS and record of decision is due by the spring of 2016. Any future inside corridor construction, especially concerning any new bridge, will be delayed until after that date. The final draft decision will also provide a "no build" alternative.

In 2025, The City of Lake Charles in partnership with the Army Corps of Engineers have approved and started construction of a new Calcasieu River Bridge as a toll bridge in late 2025. It is expected to take 5 years to complete.
