= L'Auberge Casino Resort Lake Charles =

Casino hotel in Louisiana, US

Coordinates: 30.2072°N 93.2589°W

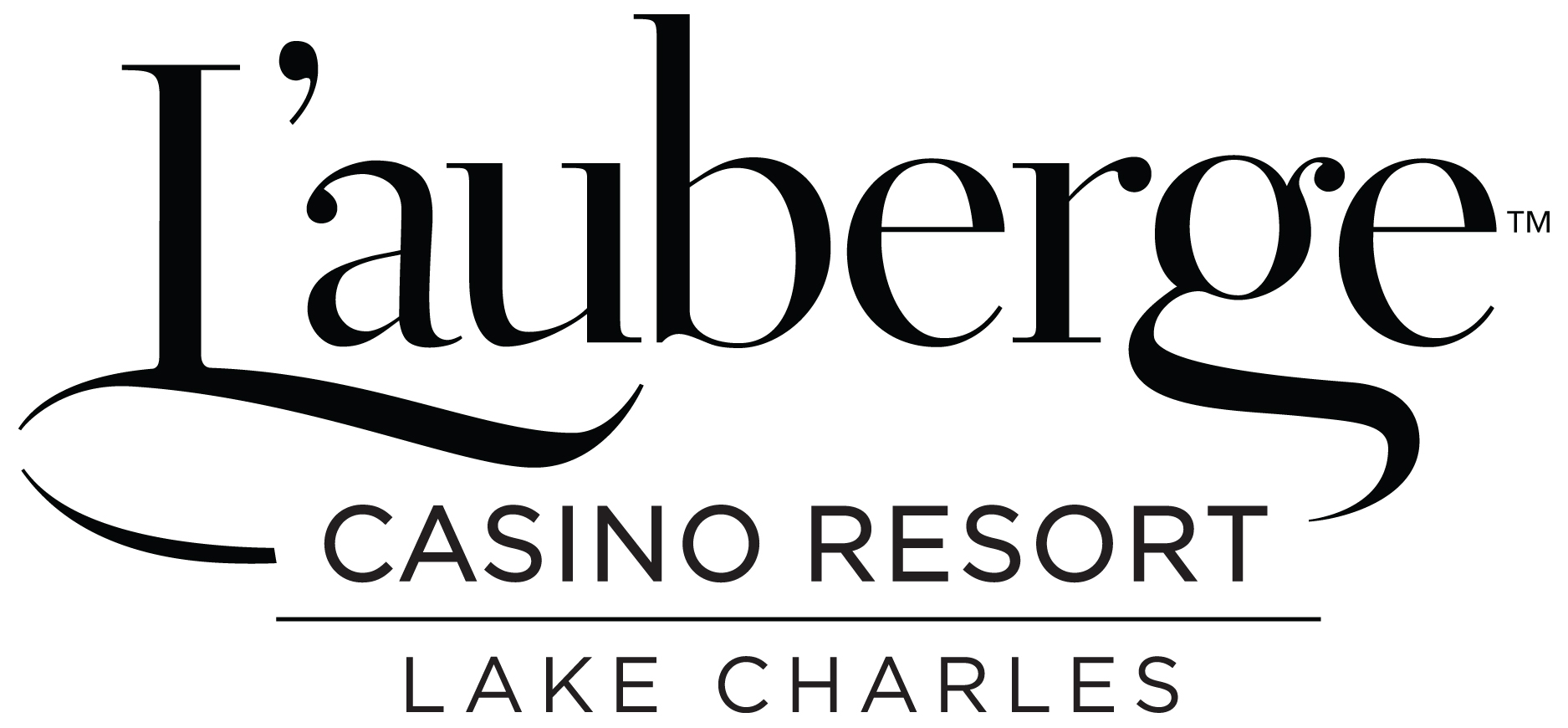

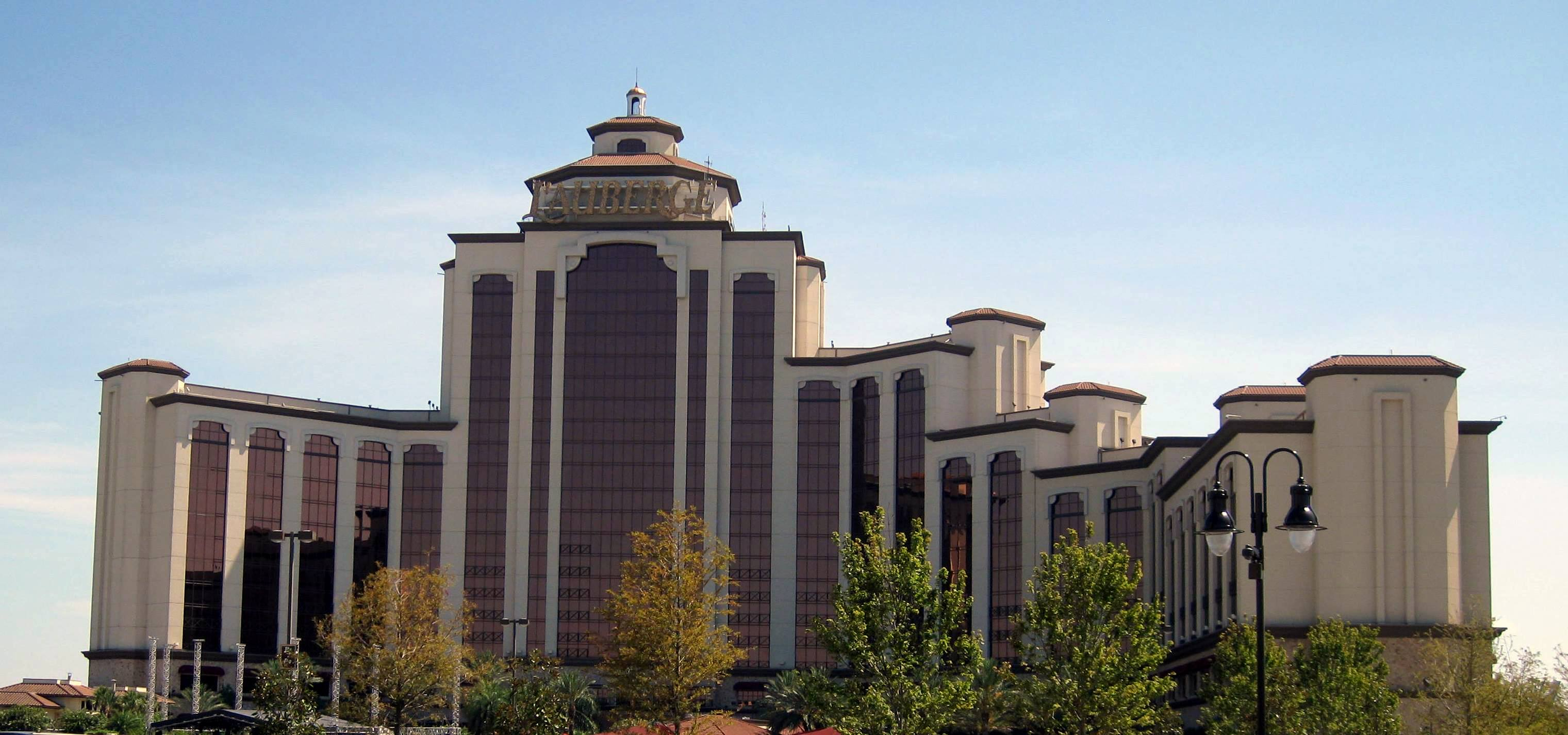
- Interactive map of L'Auberge Casino Resort Lake Charles
- Location: Lake Charles, Louisiana
- Opened: May 26, 2005
- No. of rooms: 999
- Signature attractions: Restaurants; Shops; 18-Hole Golf Course
- Notable restaurants: Le Beaucoup Buffet; Ember Grille & Wine Bar; Jack Daniel’s Bar & Grill; Asia; Favorites Southern Kitchen; Lattes; Desserts; Touloulou's; Drago’s seafood kitchen
- Owner: Gaming and Leisure Properties
- Operating license holder: Penn Entertainment
- Website: llakecharles.com

L'Auberge Casino Resort Lake Charles is a casino hotel in Lake Charles, Louisiana. It is owned by Gaming and Leisure Properties and operated by Penn Entertainment.

L'Auberge employs over 2,400 people, and has nearly 1,000 hotel rooms. It regularly draws in 400,000 visitors a month.

== History ==
The casino was opened by Pinnacle Entertainment in May 2005.

In April 2016, the property was sold to Gaming and Leisure Properties along with almost all of Pinnacle's real estate assets, and leased back to Pinnacle. Penn National Gaming (now Penn Entertainment) acquired Pinnacle in October 2018, including the operations the resort.

== Facility ==
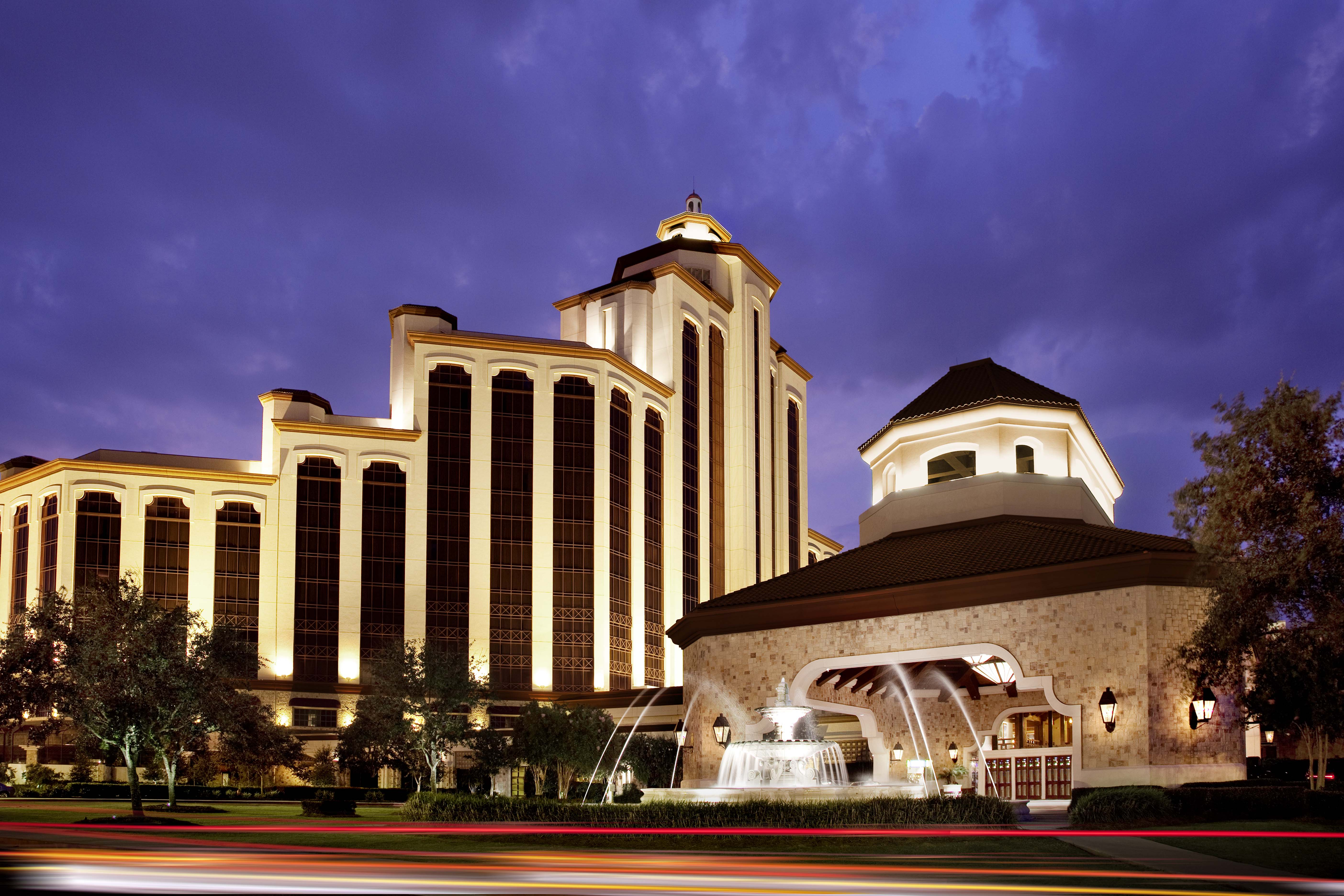
L'Auberge Casino Resort Front Entrance

The resort includes a spa, swimming pools, shops and a golf course, designed by Tom Fazio. In houses several food outlets, including the Kim Son restaurant Asia.

The building was designed by Bergman Walls Associates. Due to gambling laws that allow riverboat casinos in Louisiana, the casino is built on a floating structure located on the Calcasieu River.
