= Lake Charles, Louisiana =

City in Louisiana, United States

Lake Charles
- City
- Top to bottom, L-R: Downtown Lake Charles (the tall building on the left has since been demolished), L'Auberge du Lac Casino, McNeese State University, John McNeese statue, Israel LaFleur Bridge, Lake Charles City Court, Henderson Bayou

- Flag Seal Logo of Lake Charles
- Nickname: The Lake Area
- Location of Lake Charles in Calcasieu Parish, Louisiana

- Location in Louisiana Location in the United States
- Coordinates: 30°13′46″N 93°13′1″W
- Country: United States
- State: Louisiana
- Parish: Calcasieu
- Founded: About 1857 as Charleston
- Renamed: March 16, 1867; 159 years ago as Lake Charles
- Founder: Charles Sallier
- Named for: Charles Sallier

Government
  - Mayor: Marshall Simien Jr. (I)
  - City Council: Members list: Dist A: Ronnie Harvey, Jr.; Dist B: Donald Fondel; Dist C: Tommy Bilbo; Dist D: Matt Young; Dist E: Stuart Weatherford; Dist F: Craig Marks; Dist G: Matthew Vezinot

Area
  - City: 48.46 sq mi (125.51 km^{2})
  - Land: 45.65 sq mi (118.23 km^{2})
  - Water: 2.81 sq mi (7.28 km^{2})
- Elevation: 15 ft (4.6 m)

Population (2020)
  - City: 84,872
  - Estimate (2024): 81,157
  - Density: 1,859.2/sq mi (717.86/km^{2})
  - Urban: 162,501
  - Metro: 254,652
- Demonym: Lake Charlesian
- Time zone: UTC−6 (CST)
  - Summer (DST): UTC−5 (CST)
- ZIP codes: 70601, 70602, 70605, 70606, 70607, 70609, 70615, 70616, 70629
- Area code: 337
- FIPS code: 22-41155
- GNIS feature ID: 2404859
- Website: www.cityoflakecharles.com

Lake Charles is the fifth-most-populous city in the U.S. state of Louisiana, and the parish seat of Calcasieu Parish, located on the namesake lake, Prien Lake, and the Calcasieu River. Founded in 1861 in Calcasieu Parish, it is a major industrial, cultural, and educational center in the southwest region of Louisiana. As of the 2020 U.S. census, Lake Charles's population was 84,872.

The city and metropolitan area of Lake Charles are considered a significant center of petrochemical refining, gambling, tourism, and education, being home to McNeese State University and Sowela Technical Community College. Because of the lakes and waterways throughout the city, metropolitan Lake Charles is often called the "Lake Area".

== History ==
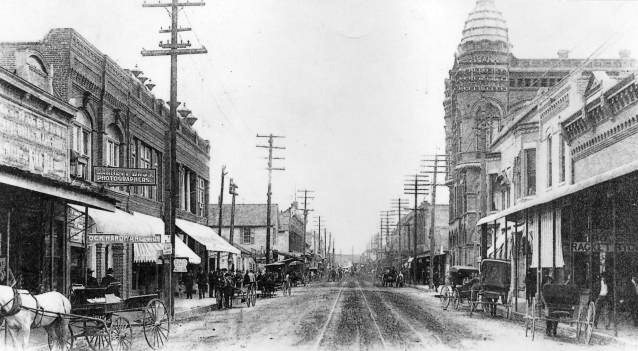
Ryan Street in Lake Charles, 1903

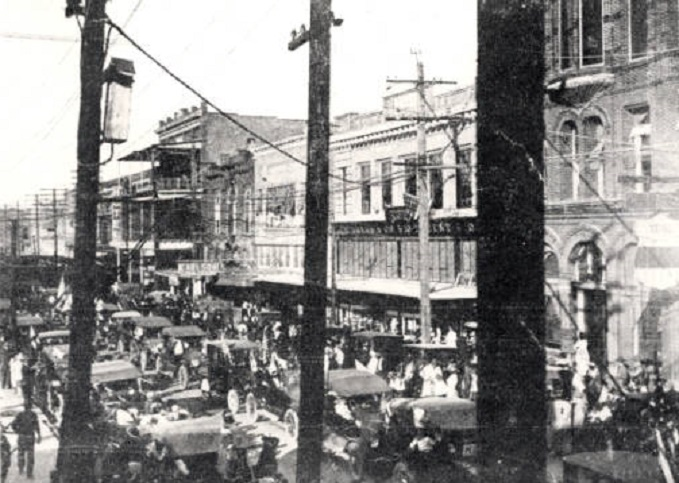
Downtown Lake Charles, c. 1917

On March 7, 1861, Lake Charles was incorporated as the town of Charleston, named after an early settler, Charles Sallier. On March 16, 1867, Charleston was reincorporated as the City of Lake Charles. The Great Fire of April 1910 devastated much of the city.

Lake Charles soon rebuilt, grew, and expanded in the 20th century. The Charleston Hotel was completed in 1929, during the administration of Mayor Henry J. Geary. During and after World War II, Lake Charles experienced industrial growth with the arrival of petrochemical refineries. The city grew to a high of some 75,000 people in the early 1980s, but with local economic recession, the population declined and stagnated. In 1985, the city was identified as a potential Strategic Homeport to support Navy Secretary John Lehman's desire for a 600-ship Navy. Support ships were to be operated from the new Naval Station Lake Charles, but with the tailing-off of the Cold War, the 1988 Base Realignment and Closure Commission recommended it be closed. By 1991, the incomplete base was dropped from the program and shuttered.

In 2005, the city was heavily damaged by Hurricane Rita. In 2020, it was battered by two hurricanes, category 4 Hurricane Laura on August 26–27, and Hurricane Delta on October 9, 2020. Lake Charles after the hurricanes was described as if "20 tornadoes came in and wiped the city".

The southern portion of the city was damaged by an EF2 tornado on October 27, 2021, and an EF1 tornado caused minor damage to downtown Lake Charles on May 13, 2024.

== Geography ==
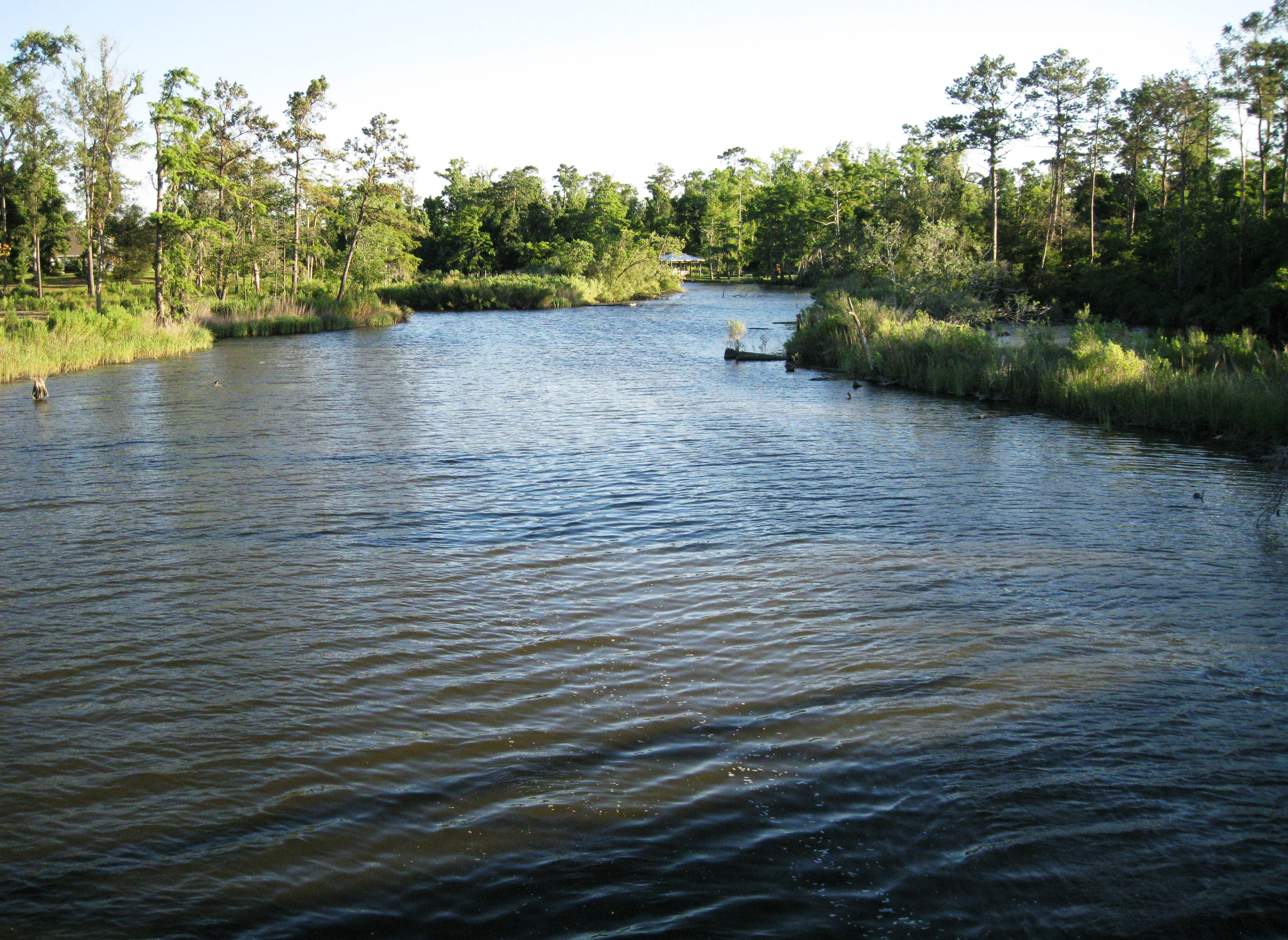
Henderson Bayou

Lake Charles, located on a level plain about 30 miles (48 km) from the Gulf of Mexico, has an elevation around 13 ft (4.0 m) above sea level, and is located on the banks of the Calcasieu River in southwestern Louisiana. It borders both Lake Charles and Prien Lake. Contraband Bayou, Henderson Bayou, and English Bayou flow through the city. Oak and pine trees dot the landscape; the lumber industry was once the main economic engine of the area. The Calcasieu Ship Channel, which allows large, ocean-going vessels to sail up from the gulf, also borders the city. The 2010 census recorded Lake Charles' total land size was 48.6 sq mi. According to the United States Census Bureau, the city has a total area of 44.8 square miles (116.0 km^{2}), of which 2.7 square miles (7.1 km^{2}), or 6.12%, is covered by water.

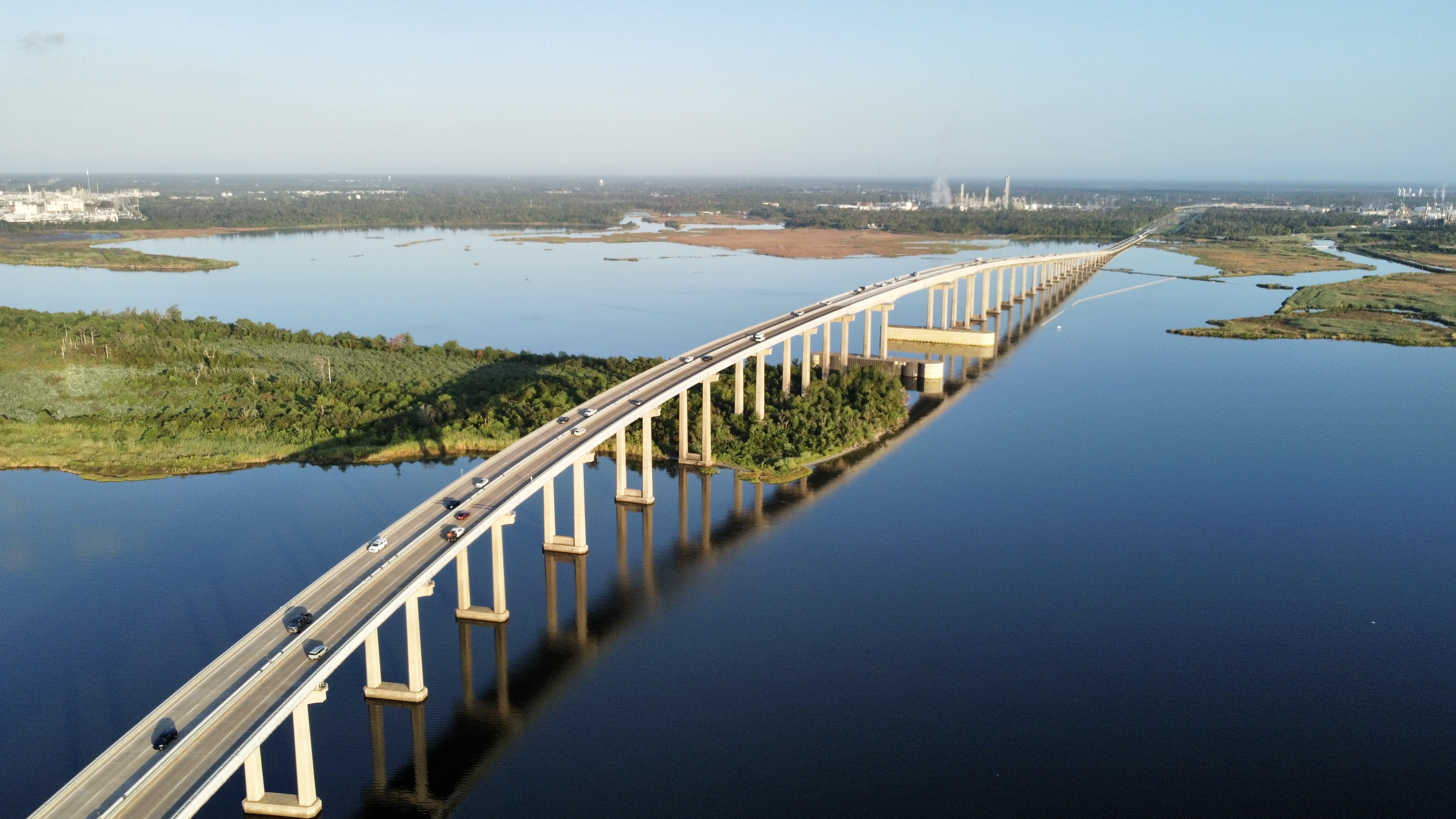
Israel LaFleur Bridge

=== Climate ===
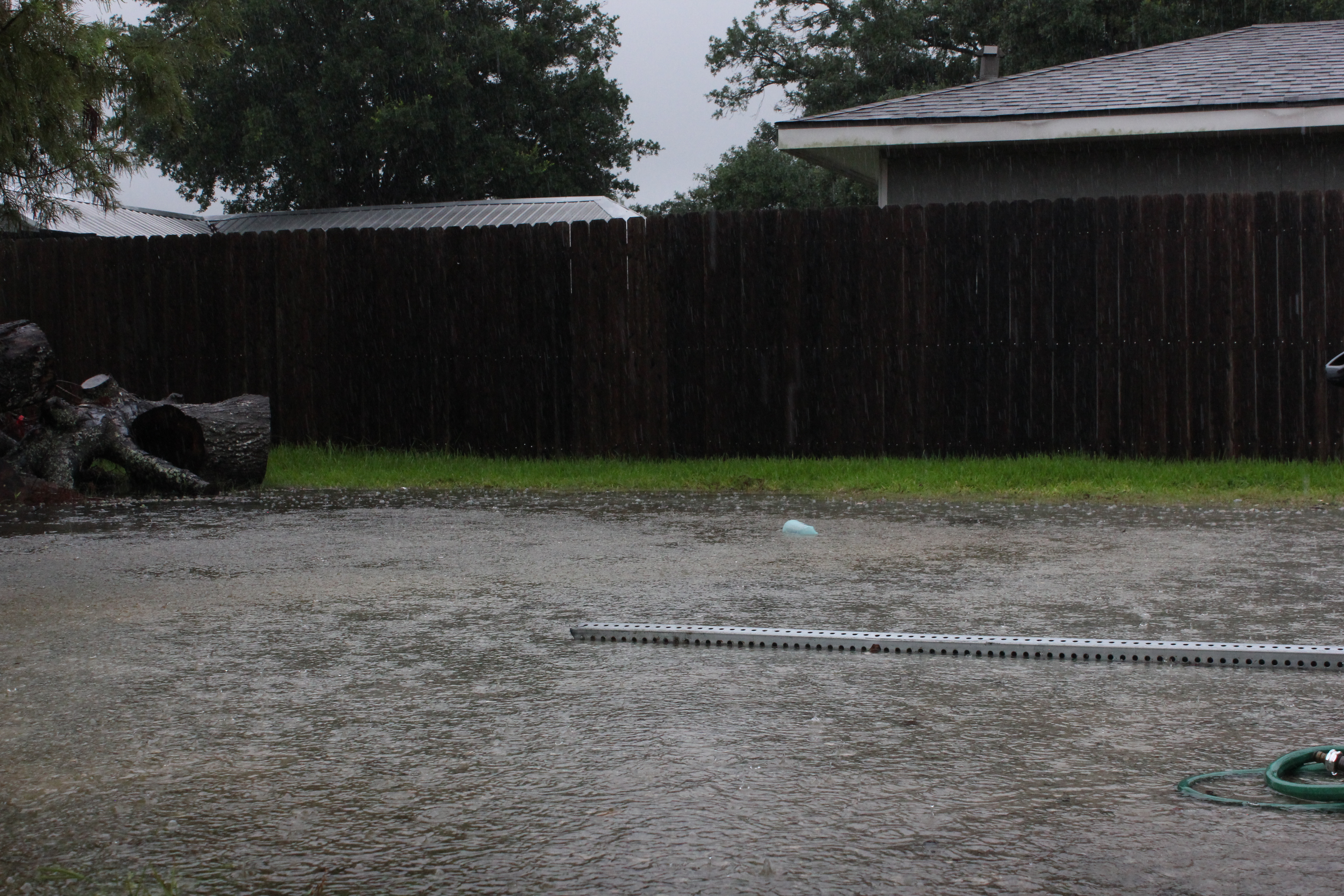
Heavy rainfall in Lake Charles

Lake Charles is tied with Port Arthur, Texas, and Astoria, Oregon, as the most humid city in the contiguous United States, and the second-most-humid measured location behind unincorporated Quillayute, Washington. The average relative humidity in Lake Charles is 90% in the morning, and 72% in the afternoon. Average annual precipitation is also high among U.S. cities, at 57.49 in (1,460 mm) per year.

Climate data for Lake Charles Regional Airport, Louisiana (1991–2020 normals, extremes 1895–present)
Month	Jan	Feb	Mar	Apr	May	Jun	Jul	Aug	Sep	Oct	Nov	Dec	Year
Record high °F (°C)	88 (31)	88 (31)	94 (34)	95 (35)	100 (38)	106 (41)	103 (39)	109 (43)	105 (41)	103 (39)	92 (33)	89 (32)	109 (43)
Mean maximum °F (°C)	76.5 (24.7)	78.1 (25.6)	82.2 (27.9)	86.4 (30.2)	91.5 (33.1)	95.4 (35.2)	96.9 (36.1)	98.1 (36.7)	95.7 (35.4)	90.5 (32.5)	83.5 (28.6)	78.6 (25.9)	99.1 (37.3)
Mean daily maximum °F (°C)	63.0 (17.2)	66.7 (19.3)	73.1 (22.8)	79.0 (26.1)	85.4 (29.7)	90.5 (32.5)	92.2 (33.4)	92.8 (33.8)	89.4 (31.9)	82.1 (27.8)	72.2 (22.3)	65.3 (18.5)	79.3 (26.3)
Daily mean °F (°C)	53.2 (11.8)	56.9 (13.8)	63.1 (17.3)	69.1 (20.6)	76.4 (24.7)	82.1 (27.8)	83.9 (28.8)	84.0 (28.9)	80.1 (26.7)	71.3 (21.8)	61.4 (16.3)	55.3 (12.9)	69.7 (20.9)
Mean daily minimum °F (°C)	43.4 (6.3)	47.1 (8.4)	53.1 (11.7)	59.3 (15.2)	67.3 (19.6)	73.7 (23.2)	75.6 (24.2)	75.1 (23.9)	70.7 (21.5)	60.4 (15.8)	50.6 (10.3)	45.3 (7.4)	60.1 (15.6)
Mean minimum °F (°C)	26.7 (−2.9)	31.5 (−0.3)	35.0 (1.7)	42.9 (6.1)	53.8 (12.1)	66.0 (18.9)	70.5 (21.4)	69.4 (20.8)	57.9 (14.4)	43.3 (6.3)	33.7 (0.9)	29.9 (−1.2)	25.1 (−3.8)
Record low °F (°C)	6 (−14)	3 (−16)	14 (−10)	30 (−1)	40 (4)	51 (11)	60 (16)	59 (15)	45 (7)	30 (−1)	23 (−5)	11 (−12)	3 (−16)
Average precipitation inches (mm)	5.89 (150)	3.26 (83)	3.67 (93)	4.44 (113)	5.40 (137)	6.54 (166)	5.69 (145)	6.19 (157)	5.18 (132)	4.80 (122)	4.13 (105)	4.56 (116)	59.75 (1,518)
Average precipitation days (≥ 0.01 in)	9.3	8.8	7.8	7.2	7.9	10.8	11.4	11.3	8.7	7.7	7.9	9.5	108.3
Average relative humidity (%)	78.8	76.5	76.3	76.1	77.3	78.2	80.1	79.8	79.4	75.9	77.3	79.0	77.9
Source: NOAA (relative humidity 1961–1990)

=== Hurricanes ===
Hurricane Laura devastated the city in 2020. The National Weather Service called the storm surge "unsurvivable" with one-minute sustained wind speeds of 150 mph (240 km/h). The Lake Charles Regional Airport had a gust of 133 mph (214 km/h), and several hangars were destroyed. Another gust in the city reached 137 mph (220 km/h). Many windows were blown out of Capital One Tower downtown, which was later demolished due to the severity of the damage. A communications tower collapsed onto the KPLC studio building (which had been evacuated), and part of a sky bridge was blown out. The radar at the NWS Lake Charles forecast office (whose staff evacuated, with the office's operations transferred to the Brownsville, Texas, office) was destroyed around the time of landfall, with its dome and much of its internal equipment sheared from the radar tower's base. A few weeks later, Hurricane Delta also hit Lake Charles.

== Demographics ==
Historical population
Census	Pop.	Note	%±
1870	474		—
1880	838		76.8%
1890	3,442		310.7%
1900	6,680		94.1%
1910	11,449		71.4%
1920	13,088		14.3%
1930	15,791		20.7%
1940	21,207		34.3%
1950	41,272		94.6%
1960	63,392		53.6%
1970	77,998		23.0%
1980	75,226		−3.6%
1990	70,580		−6.2%
2000	71,757		1.7%
2010	71,993		0.3%
2020	84,872		17.9%
2025 (est.)	82,676	▼	−2.6%
U.S. Decennial Census

Lake Charles is the principal city of the Lake Charles metropolitan statistical area, which had an estimated population of 240,082 as of 2023. It is the larger principal city of the Lake Charles-DeRidder combined statistical area, with a population of 276,909. The 2020 population of the five-parish region of Southwest Louisiana was 313,951. The city proper of Lake Charles at the 2020 census had a population of 84,872, with a population density of 1,890 people per square mile in 38,434 housing units. In 2010, the population was 71,993, reflecting a rebound from its 1990 population of 70,580.

In 2010, the median income for a household in the city was $36,001. The per capita income for the city was $22,855. About 20.9% of the population was below the poverty line; in 2020, the median income for a household in the city was $37,894; 26.7% of the population was below the poverty line. The average commute time was 22.4 minutes.

=== Racial and ethnic composition ===
Lake Charles city, Louisiana – racial and ethnic composition Note: the US Census treats Hispanic/Latino as an ethnic category. This table excludes Latinos from the racial categories and assigns them to a separate category. Hispanics/Latinos may be of any race.
Race / ethnicity (NH = Non-Hispanic)	Pop 2000	Pop 2010	Pop 2020	% 2000	% 2010	% 2020
White alone (NH)	35,540	32,793	35,143	49.53%	45.55%	41.41%
Black or African American alone (NH)	33,414	34,120	38,943	46.57%	47.39%	45.88%
Native American or Alaska Native alone (NH)	158	272	289	0.22%	0.38%	0.34%
Asian alone (NH)	766	1,184	2,230	1.07%	1.64%	2.63%
Native Hawaiian or Pacific Islander alone (NH)	13	21	82	0.02%	0.03%	0.10%
Other race alone (NH)	133	300	460	0.19%	0.42%	0.54%
Multiracial (NH)	726	1,234	2,953	1.01%	1.71%	3.48%
Hispanic or Latino (any race)	1,007	2,069	4,772	1.40%	2.87%	5.62%
Total	71,757	71,993	84,872	100.00%	100.00%	100.00%

The 2010 census determined that the racial and ethnic makeup for the city was 47% African American, 46% White, <1% Native American, 1% from other races, and 2% from two or more races. Hispanics or Latinos of any race were 3% of the population. In 2020, the U.S. Census Bureau reported that the racial and ethnic makeup for Lake Charles was 46.2% Black or African American, 42.5% non-Hispanic White, 0.4% American Indian and Alaska Native, 2.6% Asian, 2.6% some other race, 5.6% two or more races, and 5.6% Hispanic or Latino of any race.

=== Religion ===
In common with most of the American South, Christianity is the predominant religion in the Lake Area. According to the Association of Religion Data Archives in 2020, the Roman Catholic Church is the area's largest individual Christian denomination, with 51,161 adherents in Calcasieu Parish alone. The Southern Baptist Convention was the city and area's second-largest denomination, followed by nondenominational Protestant churches. Other prominent Christian denominations have included the United Methodist Church, National Baptist Convention, USA, Churches of Christ, Church of God in Christ, and the Assemblies of God USA.

=== Crime ===
In 2018, the violent crime rate in the Lake Charles area was one of the highest in the United States, across communities of all sizes. Violent offenses tracked include rape, murder, and non-negligent manslaughter, armed robbery, and aggravated assault, including assault with a deadly weapon. Lake Charles was then safer than 13% of cities in the United States. For every 100,000 people, 13.11 daily crimes occurred in Lake Charles.

== Economy ==
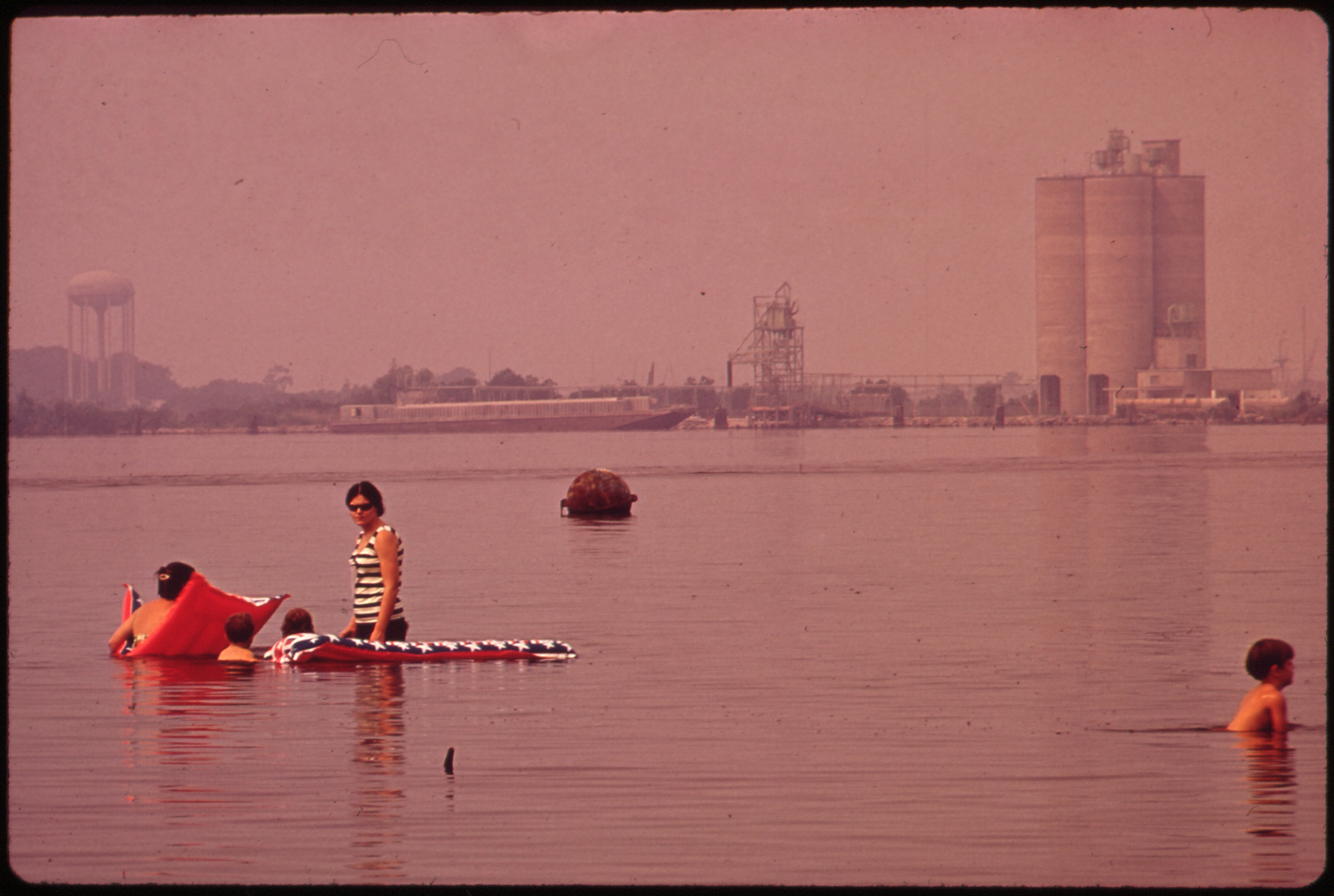
Swimming in polluted Lake Charles opposite the Olin Mathieson chemical plant in 1972: Cleanup efforts of Lake Charles' waterways have been so successful that Prien Lake now supports both recreational and commercial fishing and has a safe public beach.

The top employer, the Calcasieu Parish School System, employs around 5,000 workers. The second-largest employer is L'Auberge Casino Resort, which has 2,400 workers.

=== Industry and manufacturing ===
Several petrochemical plants and an oil refinery are located nearby along the Calcasieu Ship Channel. Turner Industries, Westlake Chemical Corporation, and Citgo each employ over 1000 people. The Lake Charles LNG terminal, immediately southwest of Lake Charles, is one of the United States' few liquified natural gas (LNG) terminals. It has facilities for LNG receipt, storage, and regasification. Other industrial companies include PPG Industries, Phillips 66, Sasol, and Grace. Local industry also includes several manufacturing companies. Chennault International Airport hosts AAR Corp, which services airplanes, and a Northrop Grumman facility. The Shaw Group has a manufacturing facility, which manufactures and exports parts for nuclear power plants.

=== Commerce and retail ===
With small businesses, big-box stores, and a regional mall, Lake Charles serves as the shopping and retail hub of the five-parish area. Prien Lake Mall, which serves nearly 300,000 people, is anchored by three department stores. The Lake Charles Power Center is a shopping area that has 1,000,000 square feet (93,000 m^{2}) of shopping space. The Cottage Shop District supports approximately a dozen small businesses.

=== Casinos ===
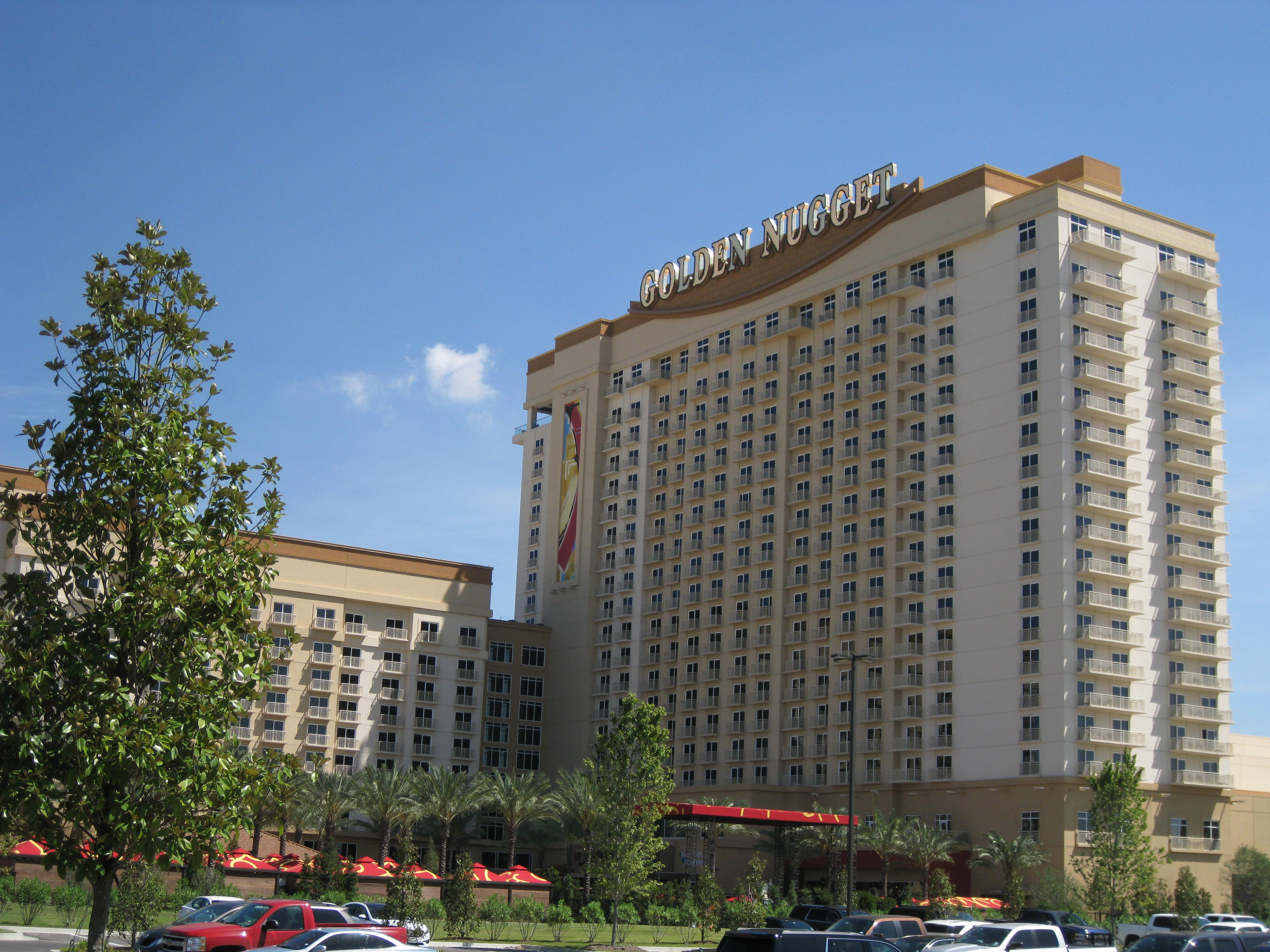
Golden Nugget Casino in Lake Charles

Lake Charles has Louisiana's biggest casino market. The L'Auberge Casino Resort Lake Charles is a 242-acre (98 ha), 26-story hotel in Lake Charles. It has nearly 1000 guest rooms, a casino, golf course, spa, and meeting center. A second casino, the Golden Nugget Lake Charles, opened in 2014 next to L'Auberge du Lac. The 18-story casino resort hotel has more than 740 guest rooms, a casino, golf course, meeting space, and retail corridor, and a private beach and marina.

While Horseshoe Lake Charles is technically in one of the city's suburbs known as Westlake, Louisiana, it forms part of the city's gambling market, along with Delta Downs in Vinton, Louisiana and Coushatta Casino Resort in Kinder, Louisiana.

== Arts and culture ==
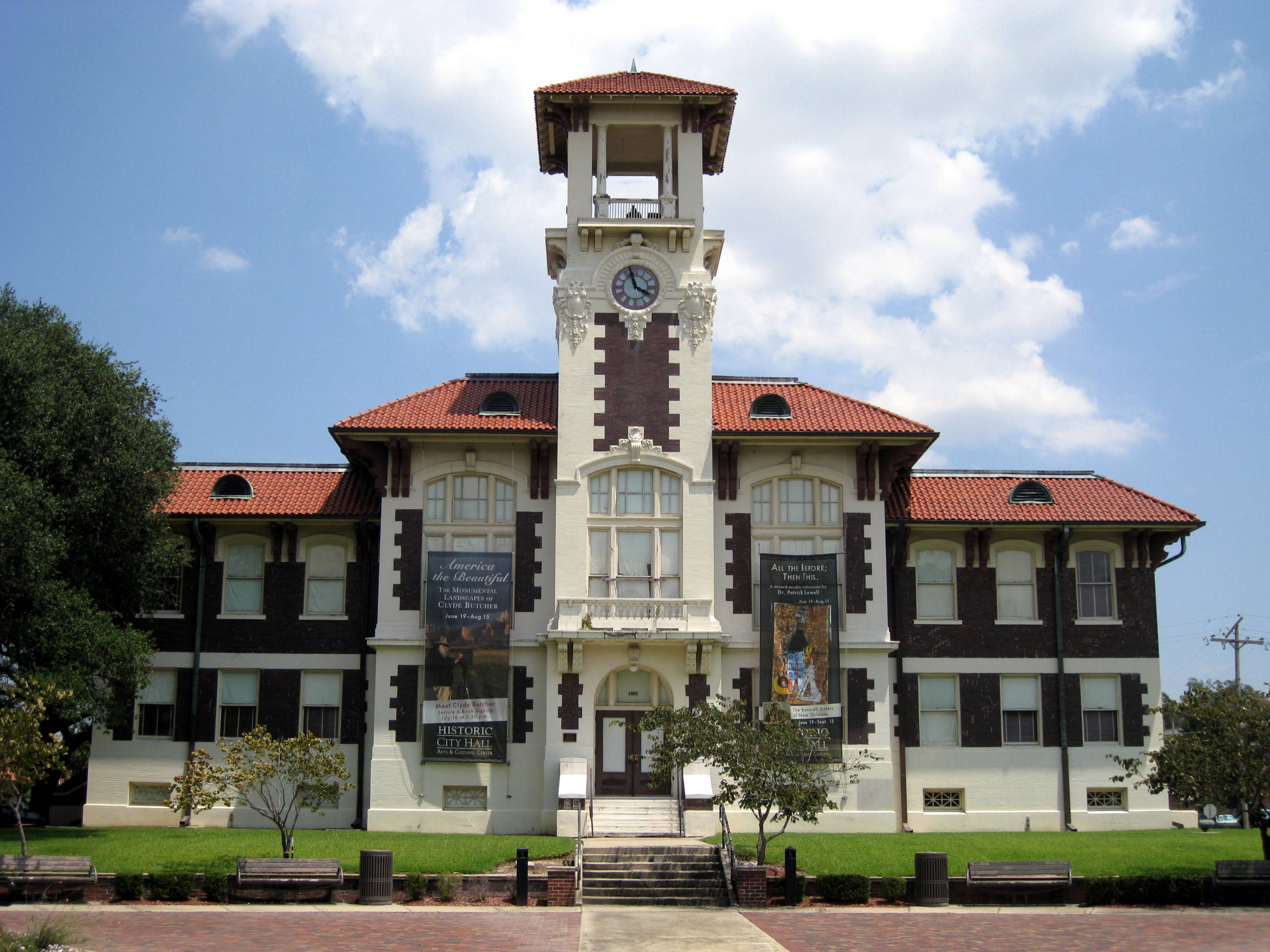
City Hall Arts and Cultural Center

Lake Charles has a Creole and Cajun culture because of its location in Southwest Louisiana—an extension of Acadiana.

The city has its own symphony orchestra, the Lake Charles Symphony. It was founded in 1958 and hosts concerts at the Rosa Hart Theatre, which has a capacity over 2,000.

The Lake Charles Little Theatre was founded in 1927 and is the second-oldest community theater in Louisiana.

Lake Charles is home to a number of museums and art galleries. The largest, the Imperial Calcasieu Museum, features a permanent historical exhibit with artifacts and an art gallery. Its grounds are home to the Sallier oak tree, which is around 400 years old. The Historic City Hall Arts and Cultural Center is used as exhibition space; moving art exhibits are displayed at this public art gallery each month. It also hosts the Charlestown Farmers' Market, which provides a venue for local farmers and merchants to sell goods.

The Central School Arts and Humanities Center, located in the historical Charpentier District, is owned by the city. Charpentier is French for "carpenter", a reference to the carpenter-architects who built the mixed-style homes in the district. Central School features the Black Heritage Art Gallery, which is on the Louisiana African American Heritage Trail, as well as the Mardi Gras Museum of Imperial Calcasieu, which features extravagant costumes and an interactive float. It has the largest collection of Mardi Gras memorabilia in the South. Other studios and cultural activities include the Art Associates Gallery, Studio 347 Gallery, the Lake Charles Symphony, and the Lake Charles Community Band.

McNeese State University produces the annual Banners Series of various musical and theatrical performances. Banners also hosts lectures and presentations from notable persons and academics. Local theaters include the Lake Charles Little Theatre, the Artists Civic Theatre and Studio, and the Children's Theatre.

=== Louisiana Pirate Festival ===
Many festivals are held at the Civic Center. The most popular, the Louisiana Pirate Festival (formerly Contraband Days), is hosted on the Civic Center grounds and lakefront. The festival is a 12-day annual festival held during the first two weeks of May. The celebrations are filled with savory Cajun food, family fun, and live entertainment, including several national acts. The festival is regularly attended by more than 200,000 people, making it one of the largest celebrations in Louisiana. In a reference to the legends of piracy on the lake and Contraband Bayou, the festival begins when the pirate Jean Lafitte and his crew capture the city and force the mayor to walk the plank.

=== Mardi Gras ===
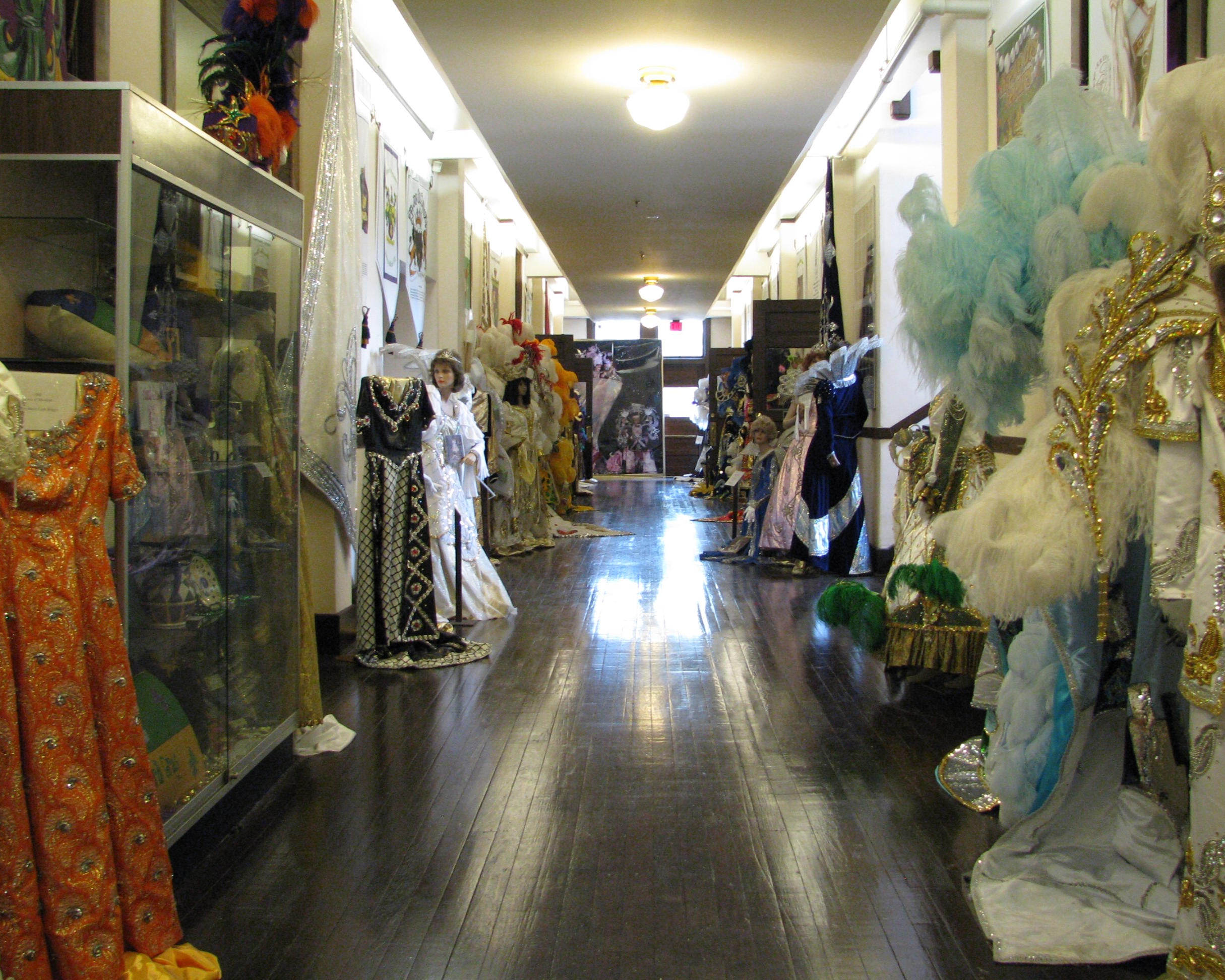
Mardi Gras Museum of Imperial Calcasieu

Mardi Gras in Lake Charles has a long history dating back to 1882, when Momus, King of Mardi Gras, landed his royal yacht at the foot of Pujo Street downtown. Throughout the two World Wars, Mardi Gras was downsized, which led to a lack of participation by the area's youth. However, an interest in redeveloping the festivities arose, and the first Mardi Gras Ball in Lake Charles was staged in 1964. The full revival of Mardi Gras in Lake Charles was not realized until 1979, when several Krewe captains formed the "Krewe of Krewes", with the primary purpose of parading and promoting Mardi Gras for local residents. In 1985, Mardi Gras of Imperial Calcasieu, Inc. was formed by a group of civic-minded volunteers to further aid in the preservation of this festival. Mardi Gras in Lake Charles regularly draws in crowds of 150,000.

=== Cultural events ===
Some of the city's cultural events include Chuck Fest, Martin Luther King Festival, Livestock Show & Rodeo, Black Heritage Festival, Garden Festival, Palm Sunday Tour of Homes, Downtown at Sundown, Memorial Day Avenue of Flags, Crawfish Festival, Asian/American Culturefest, Cajun French, Creole, Zydeco Music & Zydeco Trail Rides, Food Festivals, Marshland Festival, Gatorman Triathlon, Music & Food Festival, Arts Fest, and Riverside Fall Festival.

=== Libraries ===
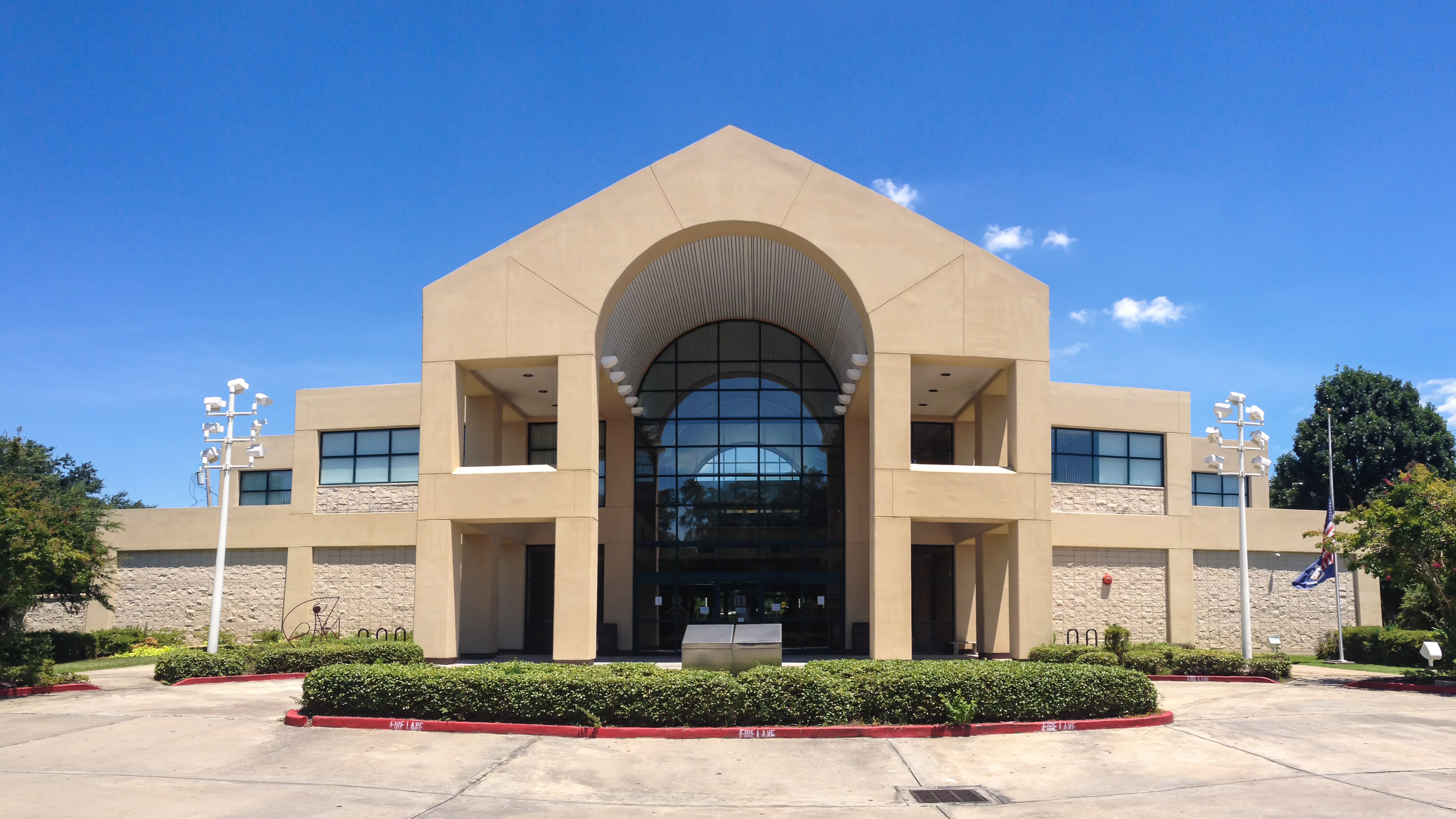
Central Library

Lake Charles has four libraries. The largest, with over 400,000 volumes, is Frazar Memorial Library, on the McNeese State University campus. The first library, Carnegie Memorial Library, was financed by Andrew Carnegie and opened in 1904. It also houses the Southwest Louisiana Genealogical and Historical Library. It, Central Library and Epps Memorial Library are part of the Calcasieu Parish Public Library, which has 13 locations in Calcasieu Parish.

== Sports ==
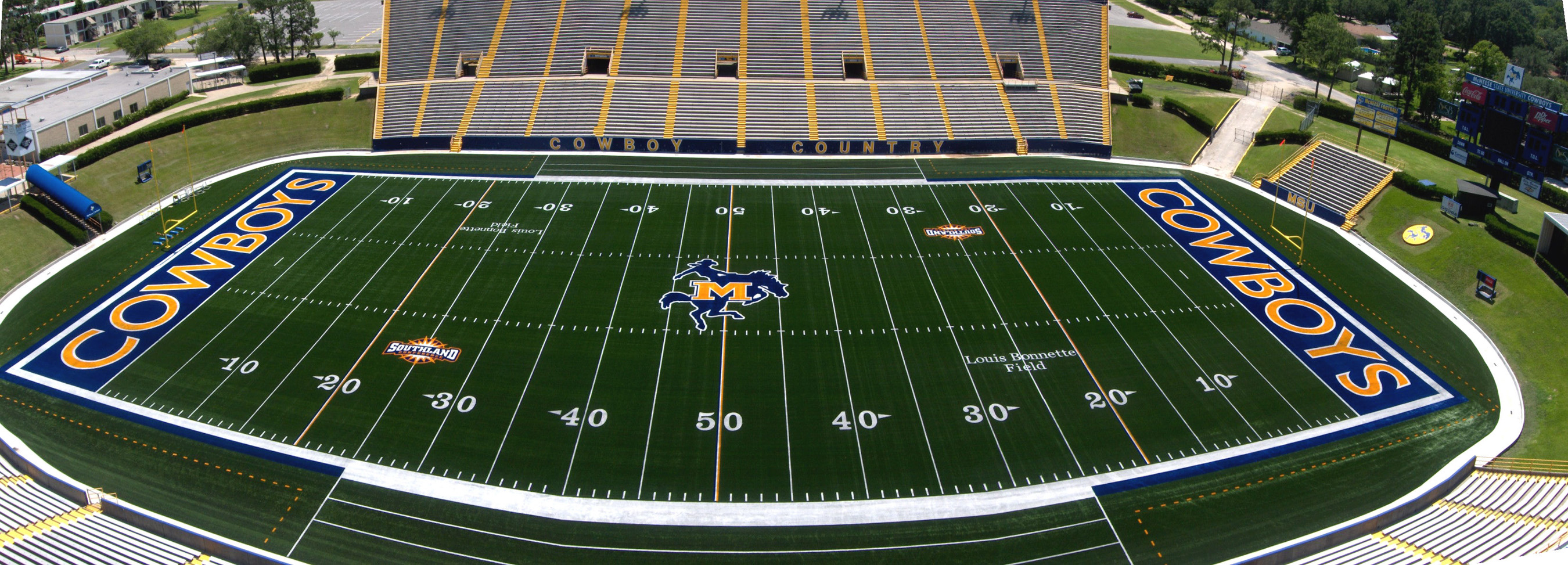
Cowboy Stadium

Lake Charles is home to the McNeese Cowboys, whose football team hosts games at Cowboy Stadium which has a seating capacity of 17,410. The Townsley Law Arena hosts the McNeese basketball teams.

Lake Charles has been home to the Lake Charles Lakers and other minor-league baseball teams, indoor football teams, a minor-league ice hockey team and soccer teams.

Golf is popular at the city's Mallard Cove Golf Course. Other golf courses include Gray Plantation Golf Course, Lake Charles Country Club Golf Course, the Contraband Bayou Golf Club, and the Country Club at Golden Nugget. Gray Plantation Golf Course is featured on Louisiana's Audubon Golf Trail.

South Lake Charles Little League has had nationally winning teams televised on ESPN.

== Parks and recreation ==
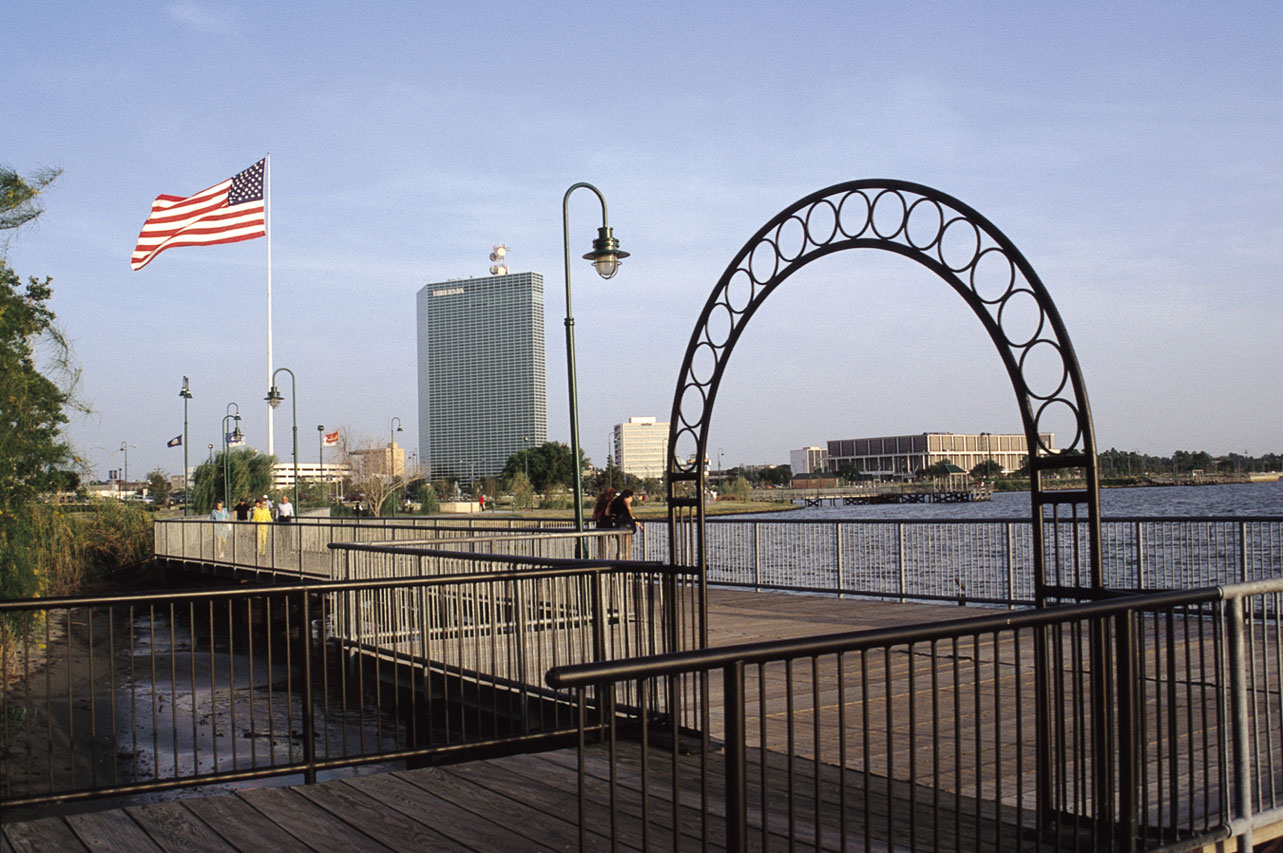
Boardwalk

The city has 31 parks, many of which include playground equipment, athletic facilities, and walking paths. Shiver-Me-Timbers Millennium Park, located downtown, was built entirely by volunteers in 2000. Adventure Cove, a state-of-the-art park, was also built by volunteers, and is specifically designed for handicapped children. Hunting and fishing are popular with both residents and visitors to the Lake Area. An All-American Road, the Creole Nature Trail – "Louisiana's Outback" – brings tourists to Lake Charles and throughout Southwest Louisiana and Southeast Texas.

== Government ==
Lake Charles has a mayor-council government. The elected officials include the mayor, the clerk of court, and seven city council members. Each council member represents a district within the city limits. One is elected president and presides over each meeting. The mayor serves a four-year term. The current mayor is Marshall Simien. The mayor appoints the city attorney.

The Lake Charles Police Department (LCPD) provides law enforcement and protection for the city. The police chief is appointed to a six-year term, and the fire chief is also appointed. The Lake Charles Fire Department has eight stations and 15 companies. McNeese State University also has its own police department, the McNeese State University Police Department.

The Lake Charles City Court's jurisdiction covers the city and Ward 3 in Calcasieu Parish. The Fourteenth Judicial District Court, in downtown Lake Charles, covers Calcasieu Parish and includes nine judges who preside over family, juvenile, civil, and criminal trials. Lake Charles is home to a United States District Court, also downtown. The Louisiana Third Circuit Court of Appeals is headquartered in the city.

Lake Charles is represented by Clay Higgins of Louisiana's 3rd congressional district. Most of the city is represented by Senator Jeremy Stine of District 27 in the Louisiana State Senate, though Mark Abraham's District 25 includes some neighborhoods of south Lake Charles.

== Education ==
=== Universities and colleges ===
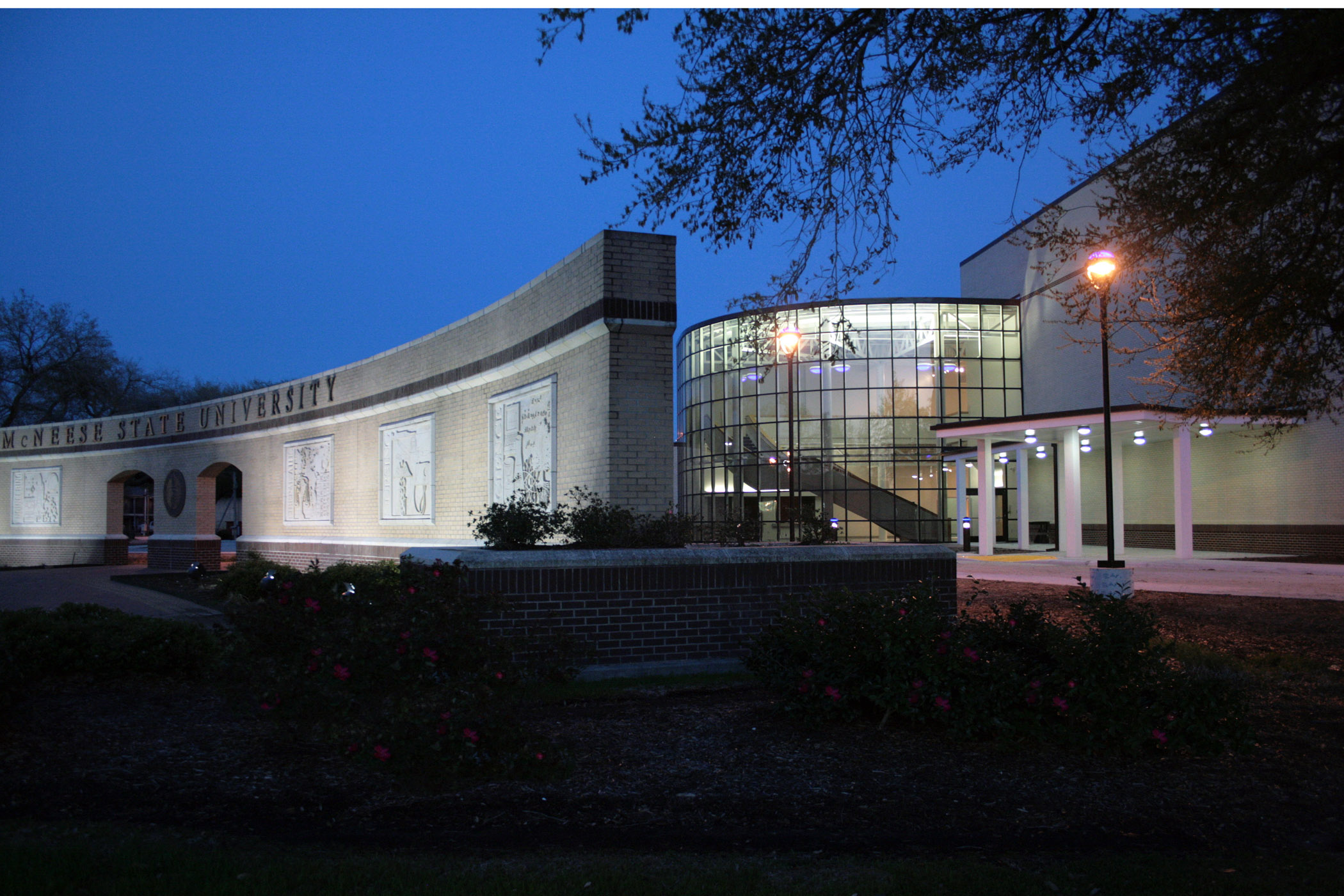
Entrance Plaza and Shearman Fine Arts Center at McNeese State University

The city has one university and one community college. McNeese State University, on a 121-acre (0.49 km^{2}) campus lined with oak trees in the heart of Lake Charles, is a four-year public university in the University of Louisiana System. Contraband Bayou flows through it. McNeese was founded in 1939 and named after educator John McNeese. It offers over 80 majors, and includes the colleges of Business, Education, Engineering and Engineering Technology, Liberal Arts, Nursing, Science, Honors College, and the Doré School of Graduate Studies. It is accredited by the Commission on Colleges of the Southern Association of Colleges and Schools. Other properties include a 65-acre (260,000 m^{2}) athletic plant and student apartment complex, the Louisiana Environmental Research Center, Burton Coliseum, the 503-acre (2.04 km^{2}) MSU Farm, and nearly 1,600 acres (6.5 km^{2}) of donated farm property used for research, farming, and ranching. Over 8,500 students attend McNeese.

SOWELA Technical Community College offers associate degrees, technical diplomas, certificate programs, and general education courses that can transfer to four-year universities. Delta School of Business and Technology specializes in vocational courses.

=== Primary and secondary schools ===
Lake Charles's public schools are operated by the Calcasieu Parish Public School System. There are two charter schools and several private schools. The Roman Catholic Diocese of Lake Charles operates and/or is affiliated with private Roman Catholic schools.

== Media ==
=== Print ===
The most widely distributed, daily newspaper is The American Press. Other popular periodicals include Lagniappe Magazine, The Jambalaya News, Gumbeaux Magazine, and Thrive Magazine. The Contraband is McNeese State University's student newspaper.

=== Television ===
Major television network affiliates include KPLC 7, an NBC affiliate also operating the area's CW affiliate on its DT2 subchannel, KSWL-LD 17, a CBS affiliate, KLTL 18, a PBS member station, KWWE-LD 19, a MyNetworkTV/MeTV affiliate, and KVHP 29, a Fox affiliate also operating the area's ABC affiliate on its DT2 subchannel.

=== Radio ===
KBYS 88.3 Oldies, KRVS 88.7 Npr, KRLR 89.1 K-Love, KYLC 90.3, KOJO (FM) 91.1, KBAN 91.5, KTSR 92.1 Classic Rock, KHLA 92.9 Classic Hits, KPPM-LP 93.5 Black Gospel, KSMB 94.5 Top40(Chr), KYKZ 96.1 Country, KQLK 97.9 Country, W252AQ 98.3, KNGT 99.5 Country, KELB-LP 100.5, KKGB 101.3 Mainstream Rock, KYBG 102.1 Classic Hits, KAJN-FM 102.9 Contemporary Christian, KBIU 103.3 Chr, KLCJ 104.1 Oldies, KKMY 104.5 Rhythmic Top 40, KZWA 104.9 Urban Adult Contemporary, KIOC 106.1 Active Rock, KJMH 107.5 Urban, KLVI 560 News/Talk, KAOK 1400 Talk, KLCL 1470 Urban Adult Contemporary, KHB42 162.400 NOAA Weather Radio

== Infrastructure ==
=== Roads ===
The city's streets are laid out primarily in a grid pattern. Interstate 10 passes through Lake Charles, connecting the city with Houston to the west and New Orleans to the east. The Calcasieu River Bridge crosses the Calcasieu River and part of lake. Featuring decorative flintlock pistols on the railing, it is 135 feet (41 m) high. About 50,000 vehicles pass over it daily. Despite its age of over 60 years, it is considered safe by the Louisiana DOTD.

Interstate 210 is an interstate highway bypass that loops through the southern portion of the city. The curving Israel LaFleur Bridge goes over the Calcasieu Ship Channel. This bridge has a 96% rating even after withstanding recent hurricanes. The loop has served Lake Charles commuters for 40 years, and carries about 40,000 vehicles per day.

Other major highways include U.S. Highway 90, which runs parallel with Interstate 10, and U.S. Highway 171, which connects the city to the north with Moss Bluff, DeRidder, and Shreveport. Highway 165, which runs northeast to Alexandria terminates at Highway 90 just a few miles east of the city. Louisiana Highway 14 ends at a junction with Highway 90, and runs south then east of the city.

=== Airports ===
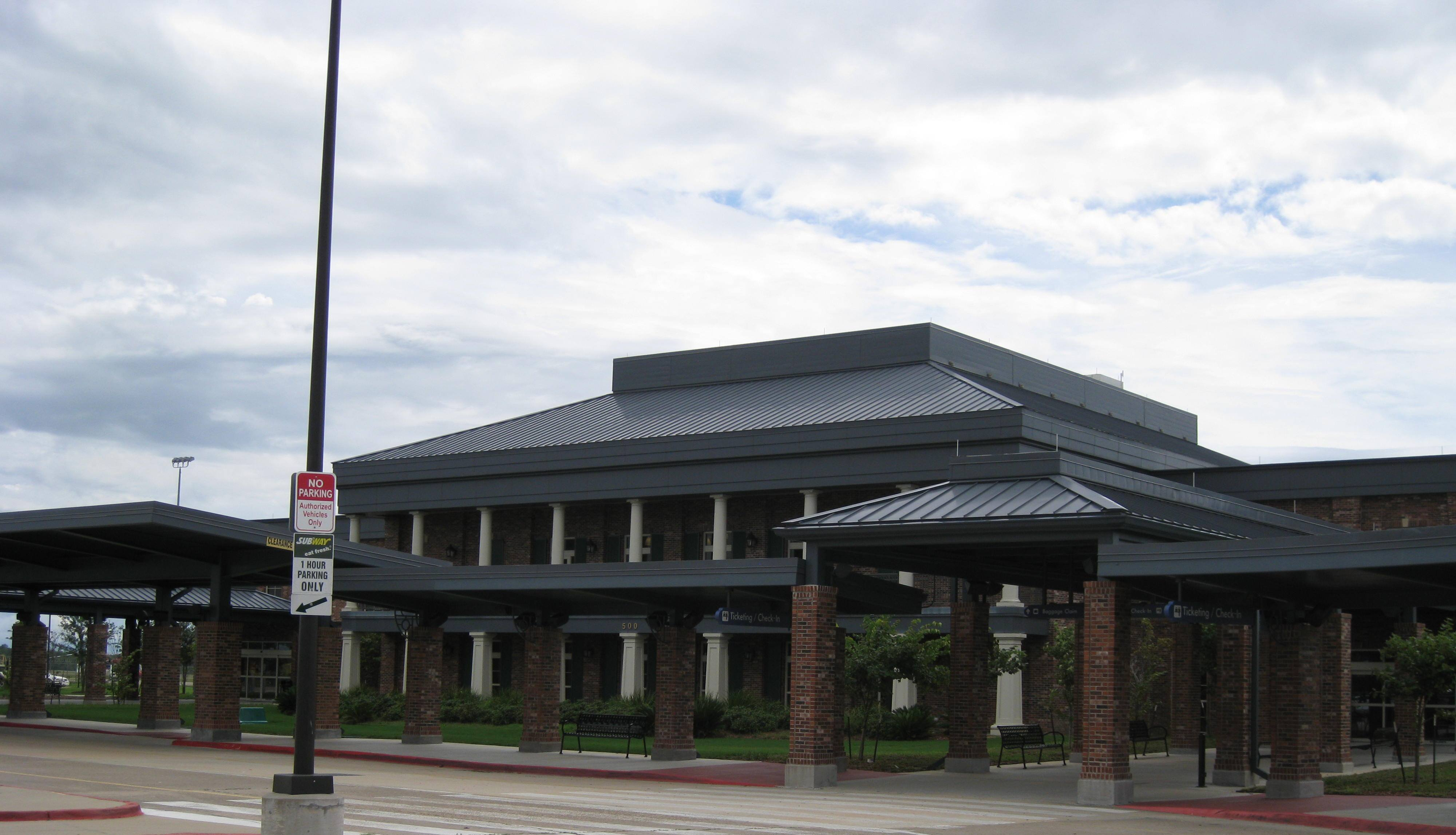
Lake Charles Regional Airport terminal

Lake Charles is served by two airports. Lake Charles Regional Airport, located south of the city, provides commercial airline service to Houston and Dallas. Chennault International Airport, while a fully operational airport, is an industrial and maintenance center. The latter airport, a former Strategic Air Command US Air Force base during the Cold War, is named for Maj. Gen. Claire Chennault, the aviator famous for commanding the Flying Tigers fighter group during World War II.

=== Seaports ===
The Port of Lake Charles is the thirteenth-busiest seaport in the United States, the fourth-largest liner service seaport in the U.S. Gulf, and a major West Gulf container load center. The City Docks in Lake Charles are the main hub of shipping activity. The Calcasieu Ship Channel provides direct access to the Gulf of Mexico 34 miles (55 km) downstream. The ship channel, which has a projected depth of 40 feet (12 m) and a bottom width of 400 feet (120 m), intersects the Gulf Intracoastal Waterway just north of Calcasieu Lake.

=== Public transportation ===
Lake Charles Transit, the city's bus system, provides five routes throughout the city. It has one Greyhound bus station, and the Amtrak station serves the Sunset Limited train route.

=== Utilities ===
Electrical needs are provided by the energy company Entergy. The city provides drinking water and sewage service to residents within city limits. Water is treated at six water treatment facilities in the city.

=== Healthcare and medicine ===
Lake Charles is served by two hospitals with multiple locations. Christus St. Patrick Hospital operates the Lake Area Medical Center campus in south Lake Charles, and Lake Charles Memorial Hospital operates a birthing hospital called Lake Charles Memorial Hospital for Women.

== In popular culture ==
- The musical Caroline, or Change by Tony Kushner, which was nominated for the Tony Award for Best Musical in 2004, is set in Lake Charles.
- Lake Charles is mentioned in Jack Kerouac's On the Road. After leaving Sal Paradise in Mexico, Dean Moriarty's car breaks down in Lake Charles.
- Lucinda Williams, singer and songwriter, wrote the song "Lake Charles" about her hometown.
- Lake Charles is mentioned as the traveler's destination in the song "Up on Cripple Creek" by The Band.

=== Films ===
Lake Charles is featured or mentioned in The Drowning Pool, The Beyond, A Taste of Louisiana with Chef John Folse & Co., Passion Fish, Good Eats, UFC 22: There Can Be Only One Champion, UFC 24: First Defense, Blue Vinyl, Little Chenier, Mercy, Split Ends, All Over But to Cry, Film Hustle, Good Boy, and 10 Cloverfield Lane.

== Sister cities ==
- Sioux City, Iowa, United States (1995)
- Perpignan, Pyrénées-Orientales, France (1993)
- Cobh, County Cork, Ireland (2008)

== See also ==
- List of people from Lake Charles, Louisiana
