= Gulf Intracoastal Waterway =

Portion of the Intracoastal Waterway located along the Gulf Coast of the United States

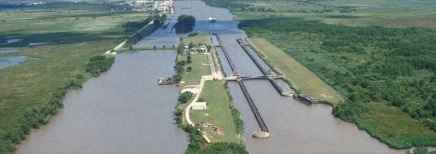
- Leland Bowman Lock near Intracoastal City, Louisiana, on the Gulf Intracoastal Waterway

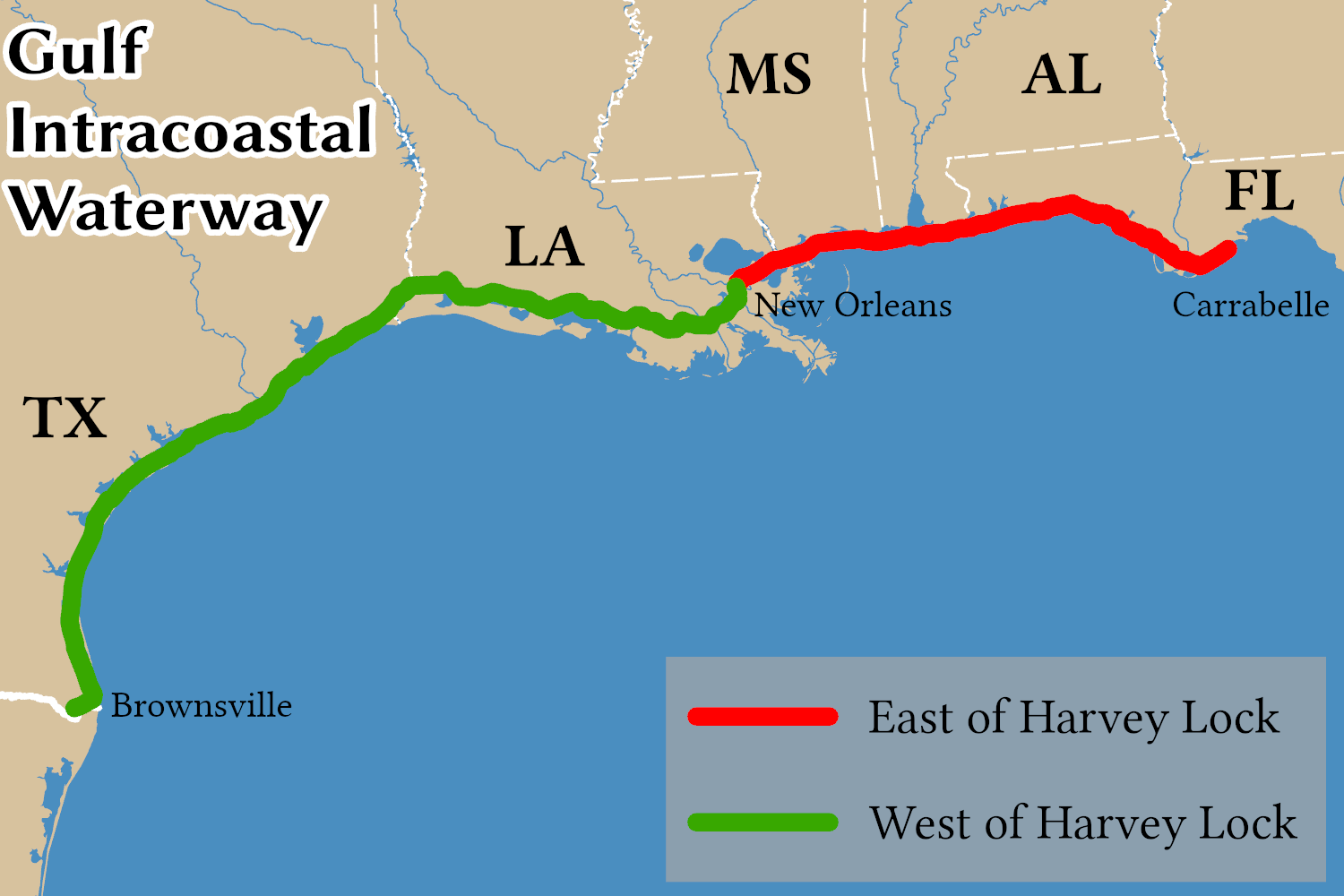
- The route of the Gulf Intracoastal Waterway
- Interactive map of Gulf Intracoastal Waterway
- Location: Gulf Coast of the United States
- Country: United States

Specifications
- Length: 1,300 miles (2,100 km)

History
- Date completed: June 18, 1949

Geography
- Start point: Brownsville, Texas
- End point: St. Marks, Florida
- Branch of: Intracoastal Waterway
- Connects to: Various

The Gulf Intracoastal Waterway (GIWW) is the portion of the Intracoastal Waterway located along the Gulf Coast of the United States. It is a navigable inland waterway running approximately 1,300 mi (2,100 km) from St. Marks, Florida, to Brownsville, Texas.

The waterway provides a channel with a controlling depth of 12 ft (3.7 m), designed primarily for barge transportation. Although the U.S. government proposals for such a waterway were made in the early 19th century, the Gulf Intracoastal Waterway was not completed until 1949.

== EHL & WHL mileages ==
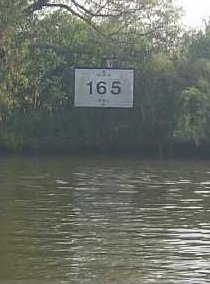
The Corps of Engineers marks the Intracoastal with channel markers like this one.

Locations along the Gulf Intracoastal Waterway are defined in terms of statute miles (as opposed to nautical miles, in which most marine routes are measured) east and west of Harvey Lock, a navigation lock in the New Orleans area located at 29.909°N 90.084°W. The Hathaway Bridge in Panama City, Florida, for example, is at mile 284.6 EHL (East of Harvey Lock). The Queen Isabella Causeway Bridge at South Padre Island is at mile 665.1 WHL (West of Harvey Lock).

== Connecting waterways ==
The Gulf Intracoastal Waterway crosses or meets, and in some cases is confluent with, numerous other navigable rivers and waterways. They include:

- Apalachicola River
- Arroyo Colorado
- Atchafalaya River
- Bayou Lafourche
- Bayou Terrebonne
- Calcasieu River
- Calcasieu Ship Channel
- Delcambre Canal
- Houston Ship Channel
- Industrial Canal
- Lower Mississippi River
- Mississippi River-Gulf Outlet Canal
- Mobile Bay (connecting to the Tenn-Tom Waterway)
- Pearl River
- Sabine-Neches Waterway (Includes portions of)
  - Neches River
  - Sabine Lake
  - Sabine River
- Santa Rosa Sound
- The Rigolets
- Vermilion River

== Operations and Cargo ==
As of 2018, The GIWW was the 3rd busiest waterway in the U.S. in terms of tonnage, behind the Mississippi River and the Ohio River. The 112 million tons shipped, worth $90 billion, included 69 million tons of petroleum and petroleum products and 23 million tons of chemicals.

== Ports and harbors ==
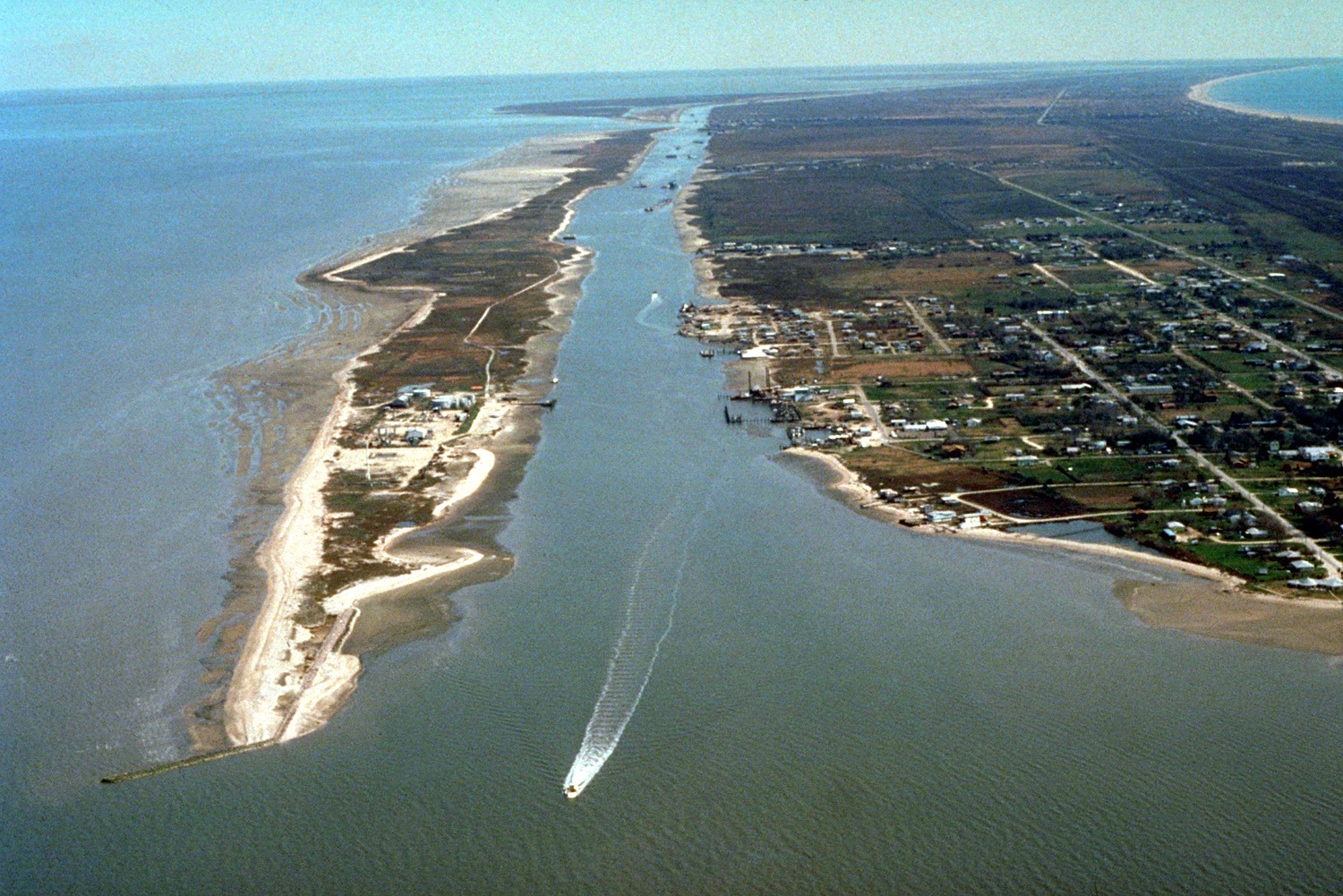
The Gulf Intracoastal Waterway enters Galveston Bay at Port Bolivar, Texas

Many of the busiest ports in the United States in terms of tons of cargo are located on or near the Gulf Intracoastal Waterway. Notable ports on or near the waterway include:
Florida

- Apalachicola, Florida
- Carrabelle, Florida
- Panama City, Florida
- Pensacola, Florida

Alabama

- Mobile, Alabama - Ranked 11th busiest

Mississippi

- Gulfport, Mississippi
- Pascagoula, Mississippi - Ranked 29th busiest

Louisiana

- Baton Rouge, Louisiana - Ranked 7th busiest
- Houma, Louisiana -
- Intracoastal City, Louisiana
- Lake Charles, Louisiana - As of mid-2024 ranked 10th busiest. The GIWW has the Calcasieu Lock just east of Lake Charles. The three-fold purpose is to facilitate navigation, provide flood relief, and prevent possible saltwater intrusion into the Mermentau River Basin.
- Larose, Louisiana
- Morgan City, Louisiana
- New Orleans, Louisiana - Ranked 5th busiest
- Port Allen, Louisiana
- Port of South Louisiana - Ranked 2nd busiest
- Port of Plaquemines - Ranked 12th busiest

Texas

- Beaumont, Texas - Ranked 8th busiest
- Brownsville, Texas
- Corpus Christi, Texas - Ranked 3rd busiest
- Port Freeport, Texas - Ranked 16th busiest
- Galveston, Texas - Ranked 46th busiest
- Houston, Texas - Ranked as busiest port in the United States
- Port Arthur, Texas - Ranked 15th busiest
- Port Lavaca - Point Comfort, Texas
- Texas City, Texas - Ranked 20th busiest
- Victoria, Texas

== See also ==
- IHNC Lake Borgne Surge Barrier
- Gulf Intracoastal Waterway West Closure Complex

== Sources ==
- The Marine Transportation System and the Federal Role: Measuring Performance, Targeting Improvement. Special report (National Research Council (U.S.). Transportation Research Board). Transportation Research Board. 2004. ISBN 978-0-309-09452-8.
- US Army (March 6, 2013). "What is the district's role in maintaining the GIWW?". army.mil. US Army.
