= Prien Lake =

Lake in Louisiana, United States

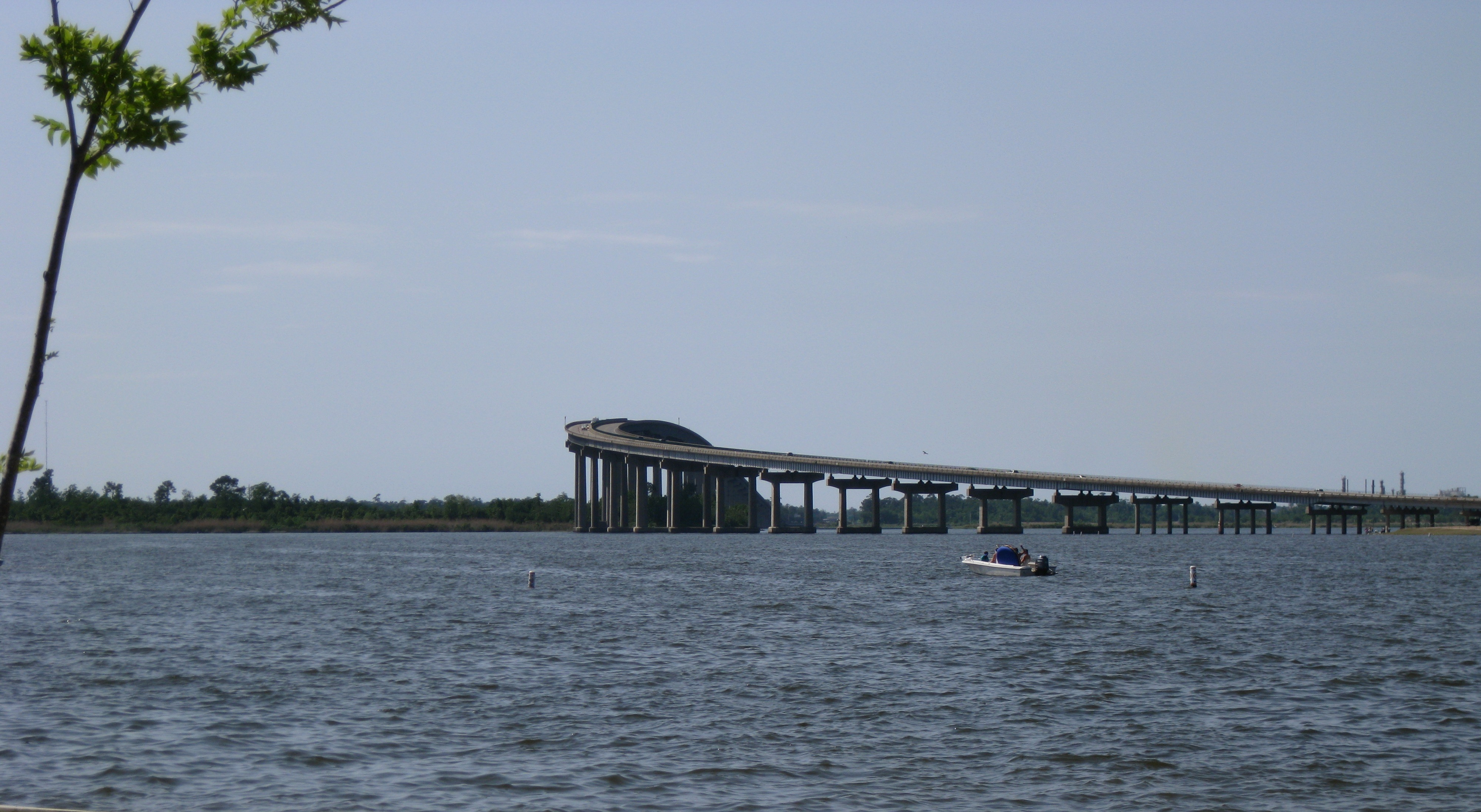
- Prien Lake and the Israel LaFleur Bridge

- Location within Louisiana Location within the United States
- Location: Calcasieu Parish, Louisiana, United States
- Coordinates: 30.1816152°N 93.2890944°W
- Primary inflows: Calcasieu Ship Channel
- Primary outflows: Calcasieu Ship Channel
- Catchment area: 2,900 acres (1,200 ha)
- Basin countries: United States
- Max. length: 2 mi (3.2 km)
- Max. width: 1 mi (1.6 km)
- Surface area: 997 acres (403 ha)
- Surface elevation: 0 ft (0 m)
- Settlements: Prien, Louisiana

Prien Lake is a lake in Calcasieu Parish, Louisiana.

It is located west of Prien, Louisiana, and south of the Israel LaFleur Bridge. The city of Lake Charles is located to the northeast.

== History ==
Prien Lake was historically located along the Calcasieu River. Construction of the Calcasieu Ship Channel was completed in 1941, and included the construction of the Rose Bluff Cutoff, northwest of Prien Lake. The cutoff enabled a more efficient navigational route, and isolated Prien Lake from the direct flow of the river.

Prien Lake connects to the Calcasieu Ship Channel at three places on the north and west sides of the lake.

== Characteristics ==
Development within the Prien Lake watershed is 36 percent commercial or residential, and 5 percent industrial.

The lake has several wetlands which are considered sensitive environments.

The lake's designated uses, according to the Louisiana Department of Environmental Quality, are recreation, and the propagation of fish and wildlife. Prien Lake supports both recreational and commercial fishing, and fish species include croaker, redfish, speckled trout, flounder, and black drum.

Two public parks provide access to Prien Lake. Prien Lake Park has a public boat launch, parking, and picnic areas. LaFleur Park has a boat launch, beach for swimming, parking, and picnic areas.
