= Calcasieu Parish Public Library =

Library system in Louisiana, US

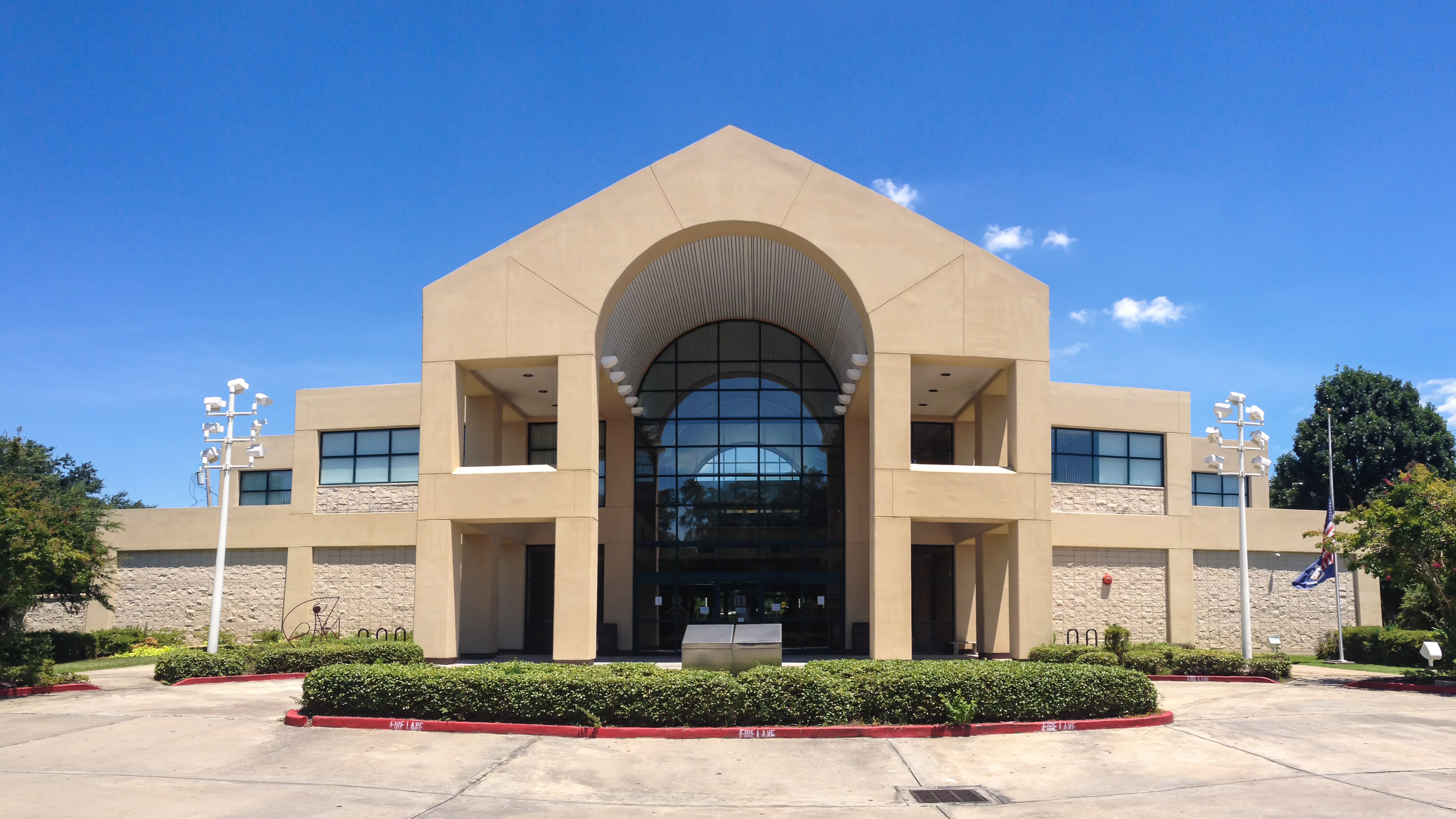
- Location: Calcasieu Parish, Louisiana
- Established: 1901
- Branches: 13

Collection
- Size: 900,000 titles in collection

Access and use
- Population served: 202,418

Other information
- Director: Marjorie Harrison
- Employees: 120+
- Website: https://calcasieulibrary.org

The Calcasieu Parish Public Library serves citizens in all of Calcasieu Parish. This system has thirteen locations and is governed by a nine-member board. The largest location is the Central Library, located in Lake Charles, Louisiana, and the library system is a member of the Libraries Southwest consortia.

== History ==
The Calcasieu Parish Public Library began in 1944. On April 4, 1973, the Calcasieu Parish Police Jury passed Ordinance #1442 consolidating the Calcasieu Parish Public Library and the Lake Charles Public Library, which was established in 1901. The consolidation went into effect on January 1, 1974. On August 1, 1973, the Calcasieu Parish Police Jury entered into a joint services agreement with the City of Lake Charles. This agreement gave the mayor of Lake Charles the power to nominate five members of the Library Board of Control. The other four seats of this board are named by the President of the Police Jury. All nine members are confirmed by the Police Jury. Two ex officio members are the Police Jury President, or their representative, and the Mayor of Lake Charles. (Note: Learn more about the history of the Calcasieu Parish Public Library by visiting this webpage - https://calcasieulibrary.libnet.info/history-of-cppl)

== Branches ==
The Calcasieu Parish Public Library has 13 locations, including the main location, Central Library. This also includes Express Libraries opened at three branch locations that were closed due to heavy damage from Hurricane Laura and Hurricane Delta in 2020. The Express Libraries were made possible by a $20,000 grant from the American Library Association.

- Carnegie Memorial Library - 411 Pujo Street, Lake Charles, LA 70601
- Central Library - 301 W. Claude Street, South Lake Charles, LA 70605
- DeQuincy Library - 102 N. Pine Street, DeQuincy, LA 70633
- Epps Memorial Library - 1619 Cessford St. (temp location), North Lake Charles, LA 70601
- Hayes Library - 7709 Perier St., Hayes, LA 70646
- Iowa Library - 109 South Thomson Avenue, Iowa, LA 70647
- Maplewood Outreach Center - 91 Center Circle, Suphur, LA 70663
- Moss Bluff Express Library - 261 Parish Road, Lake Charles, LA 70611
- Starks Library - 113 S. Highway 109, Starks, LA 70661
- Sulphur Regional Library - 1160 Cypress St., Sulphur, LA 70663
- Southwest Louisiana Genealogical & Historical Library - 411 Pujo St., Downtown Lake Charles, LA 70601
- Vinton Library - 1601 Loree St., Vinton, LA 70668
- Westlake Library - 937 Mulberry St., Westlake, LA 70669

== Other Services ==
In 2013 the Calcasieu Parish Public Library launched a free home delivery service known as “Library-to-Go.” This service is intended to serve home bound library patrons such as those at nursing homes, group homes, and daycare centers. For additional information, visit this webpage - https://calcasieulibrary.org/library-to-go

== Awards ==
In 2010 the Calcasieu Parish Public Library received the Highsmith Library Innovation Award that year for a Summer Reading Program Yard Sign project. Yard signs were used to encourage students to read during the summer.
