= Port of Lake Charles =

- Interactive map of Port of Lake Charles
- Location in USA Louisiana

Location
- Country: United States
- Location: Lake Charles, Louisiana
- Coordinates: 30°10′51″N 93°17′48″W

Details
- Opened: 1924
- Operated by: Lake Charles Harbor and Terminal District
- Owned by: Lake Charles Harbor and Terminal District
- Type of harbour: Artificial / natural
- No. of berths: 15 public berths, 8 private berths

Statistics
- Attributable jobs: 10,000
- Website https://www.portlc.com

The Port of Lake Charles is an industrial port based in the city of Lake Charles, Louisiana, U.S.A. It is a major employer in Lake Charles. It is the twelfth-busiest port in the United States according to the American Association of Port Authorities U.S. Port Ranking by Cargo Tonnage, 2013 report and the 83rd-busiest in the world in terms of tonnage according to the American Association of Port Authorities World Port Rankings 2013 report. According to Benchmarkia's Industrial Park Ranking, Port of Lake Charles is ranked as the fifth-largest industrial park in the world by total area. The Calcasieu Ship Channel provides direct access to the Gulf of Mexico, 34 miles downstream from the city docks. The ship channel intersects the Gulf Intracoastal Waterway just north of Calcasieu Lake. The Ship Channel has a project depth of 40 feet and a bottom width of 400 feet.

== Port ==
The Port of Lake Charles, also known as the Lake Charles Harbor and Terminal District, has a variety of components including City Docks, Bulk Terminals, the Industrial Canal, Sempra Cameron LNG, Industrial Park East, and Westlake Terminal. The major commodity on the river is crude oil, while the major export is bagged food aid for the world. Other commodities include Petroleum coke, Calcined petroleum coke, limestone, Ceramic ceramic proppants, anode Butts, gasoline, diesel fuel, Jet fuel, caustic soda, styrene monomers, and a variety of other combustibles. The port is also the future site of the $1.2 billion Syngas Plan. As of 2024, the director of the Port of Lake Charles is Richert (Ricky) Self, replaced William "Bill" Rase who retired
