= Calcasieu Ship Channel =

Coordinates: 29°59′47″N 93°20′2″W

- Interactive map of Calcasieu Ship Channel

History
- Construction began: 1922

The Calcasieu Ship Channel is a waterway that connects the city of Lake Charles, Louisiana, with the Gulf of Mexico. Its existence allows the Port of Lake Charles, which is more than 30 miles from the Gulf, to be the 10th largest seaport in the United States. The primary use of the channel is the importation of materials for processing in Lake Charles' large refinery industry, including petroleum, liquefied natural gas, and the export of refined products, such as gasoline and chemicals.

== Early history ==
The Gulf Intracoastal Waterway (GIWW), from the Sabine River (Louisiana) to the Calcasieu River, was built between 1913 and 1914 with a width of 40 feet (12 m) and a depth of 5 feet (1.5 m). In 1925 the channel was dredged to 100 feet (30 m) wide and 9 feet (2.7 m) deep. Sometime in the 1930s the canal was dredged to 30 feet (9.1 m) deep and called the Lake Charles Deep Water Channel. In 1941 the channel was part of the GIWW and maintained at 12 feet (3.7 m) deep and a width of 125 feet (38 m). Through the GIWW the Sabine and Calcasieu estuaries became co-mingled with saltwater intrusion which resulted in the combined Calcasieu-Sabine Basin.

== History ==
The ship channel runs along the west side of Calcasieu Lake between the lake and "West Cove". It is a combination of natural lakes, streams, and man-made cuts. The Calcasieu Ship Channel comprises two sections, the "Outer Bar" at 33 miles (29 nmi), 30 miles (26 nmi) pass the seaward state boundary, and "The Inner Channel" at 32 miles (28 nmi) measured from the three mile seaward boundary.

Authority of the United States Army Corps of Engineers and Louisiana to regulate traffic in the ship channel, specifically past the three mile border, was affirmed in court concerning ship channel pilots. Being a busy United States port there are ship studies on the channel

Over the years, as ships have grown larger, the channel has had increasing difficulty in accommodating the larger ships. In June 2009, the Army Corps of Engineers agreed to dredge the channel and bring it up to modern standards of 40 feet (12 m) depth and 400 feet (120 m) bottom width.

By widening and straightening the Calcasieu River (removing the natural sinuosity), as well as dredging, the Port of Lake Charles has been able to handle larger ships. Cruise ships aside, the channel cannot accommodate the larger ships. The channel jetties extends into the Gulf of Mexico 1.2 miles (1.9 km).

== Port of Lake Charles ==
The "Port of Lake Charles began 2024 as the nations 13th busiest port but by May 2024 had reached 10th place.
