= Calcasieu River =

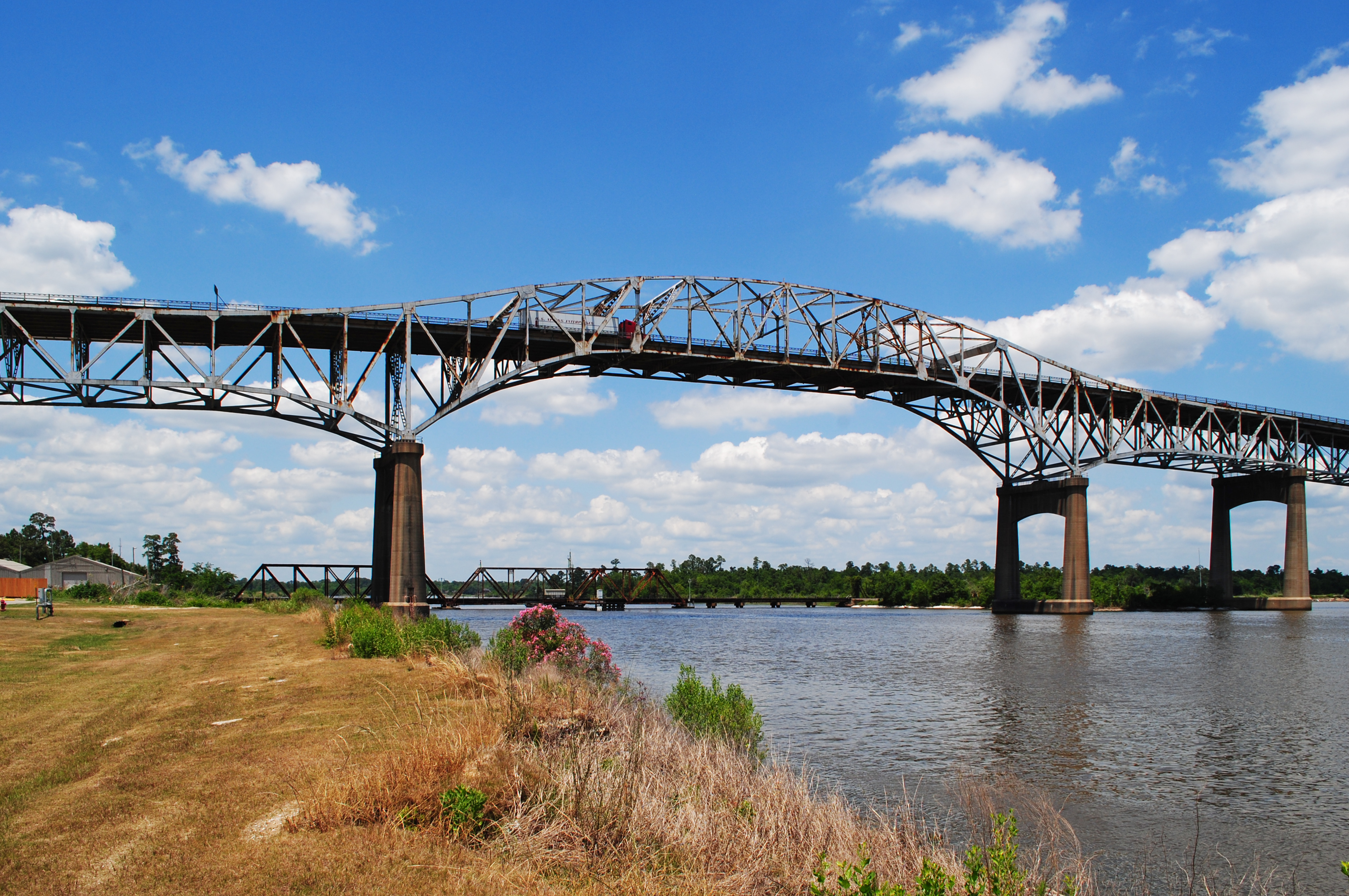
- Interstate 10 bridge over the Calcasieu River at Lake Charles
- Calcasieu River

Location
- Country: United States
- State: Louisiana
- Parishes: Vernon; Rapides; Allen; Jefferson Davis; Calcasieu; Cameron

Physical characteristics
- Source: Confluence of bayous/forests
  - location: Vernon Parish, Louisiana, United States
  - coordinates: 31°17′29″N 93°12′16″W
- Mouth: Calcasieu Pass and Calcasieu Ship Channel; Gulf of Mexico
  - location: Cameron, Cameron Parish, Louisiana, United States
  - coordinates: 30°03′25″N 93°18′45″W
- Length: 200 mi (320 km)

Basin features
- Cities: Oakdale; Lake Charles

The Calcasieu River (/ˈkælkəˌʃuː/ KAL-kə-shoo; French: Rivière Calcasieu) is a river on the Gulf Coast in southwestern Louisiana, United States. Approximately 200 miles (320 km) long, it drains a largely rural area of forests and bayou country, meandering southward to the Gulf of Mexico. The name "Calcasieu" most likely comes through French from the Atakapa language Katkōsh Yōk ('Crying Eagle'), the name of a local Atakapa leader.

== Course ==
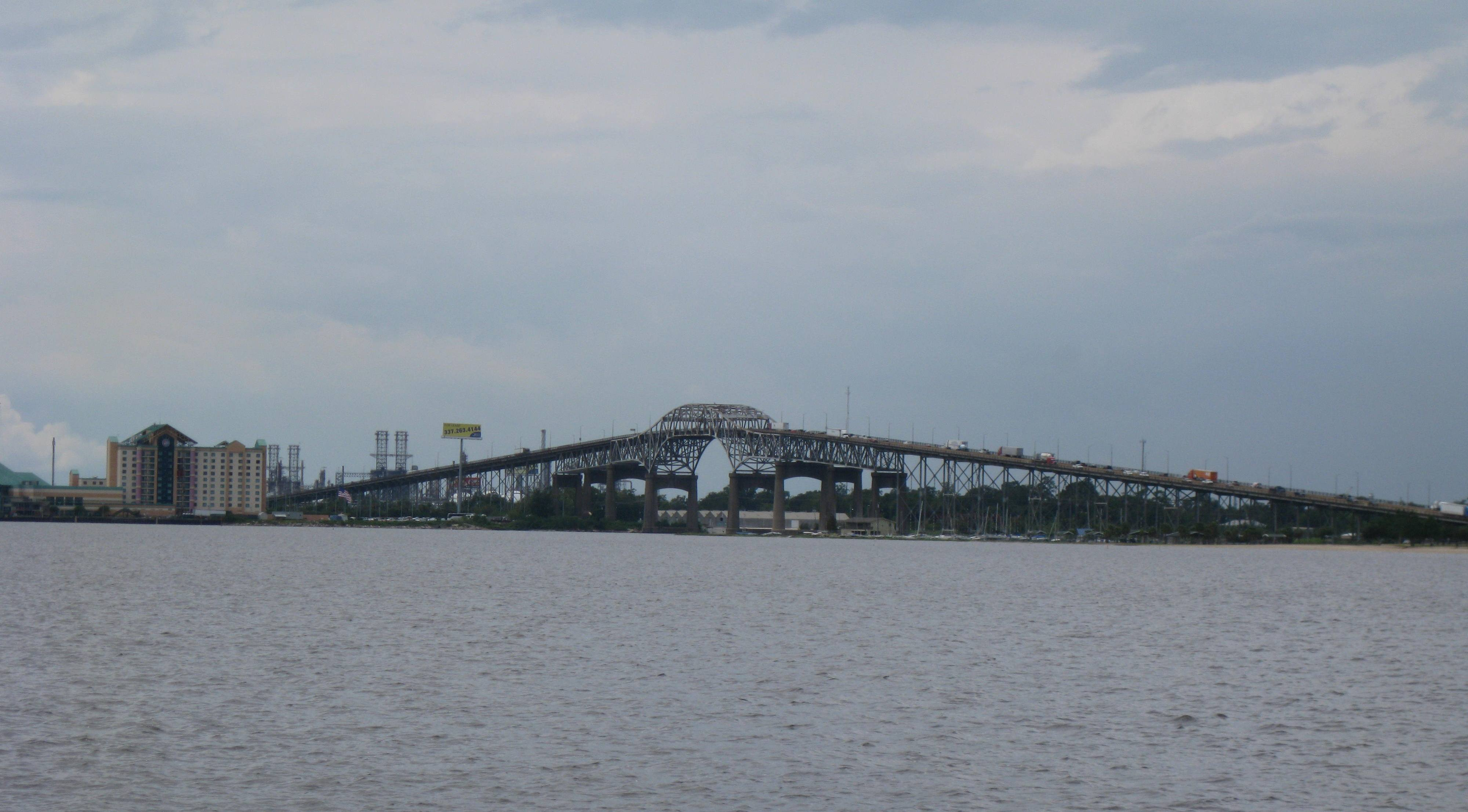
The Calcasieu River Bridge crosses the Calcasieu River in Lake Charles, Louisiana.

The Calcasieu rises in Vernon Parish, north of Leesville, and flows initially southeast, passing through the Kisatchie National Forest southwest of Alexandria. It then turns southwest, flowing past Oakdale and Lake Charles, the largest city on the river. It enters the north end of the brackish Calcasieu Lake, an estuary on the Gulf of Mexico approximately 10 miles (16 km) southwest of Lake Charles. The lake, which is referred to by locals as "Big Lake", is connected by a 5-mile (8 km) channel to the gulf on the south end. The lower portion of the river south of Lake Charles is paralleled by a navigable canal which connects to the Gulf Intracoastal Waterway.

== History ==
In the early 19th century, the area of present-day Louisiana and Texas west of the Calcasieu River extending roughly north-south to the Arroyo Hondo in Natchitoches Parish and east of the Sabine River was disputed between the United States and Spain. The dispute arose from differing interpretations of the western boundary of Louisiana under the terms of the Louisiana Purchase. The area became known as Neutral Ground and became a haven for privateers outside the legal jurisdiction of both nations.

During the US Civil War, a naval engagement occurred on May 6, 1864 at Calcasieu Pass, with the Confederates capturing two Union gun boats.

== Water quality ==
Because the river passes through areas with intensive petroleum refining and other industries, petrochemical wastes have been found contaminating the river and estuarine environment along the lower Calcasieu River. A 1993, a Condea Vista Chemical Company pipeline spill was reported by the company to have leaked 1,600,000 pounds (730 tonnes) of a highly toxic chemical known as ethylene dichloride. Mother Jones reported the spill as potentially discharging between 19,000,000 and 47,000,000 pounds (8,600 and 21,300 tonnes), that would have spread throughout parts of the estuary.

Sasol Ltd purchased Condea Vista in 2000 inheriting the controversy. The site was designated a "super-fund site" and Sasol has been involved in long-term legal battles that have resulted in settlements, fines, and the clean-up of affected areas. A problem is that the chemical sinks in water and becomes covered by deposits of silt. Any clean-up would inevitably stir up the covered chemical, causing further ecological damage. The lower end of the estimated spill (19,000,000 pounds (8,600 tonnes)) would be two times the 1988 US production of ethylene dichloride, which was 9,445,000 tons. 1.6 million tons were cleaned up.

== See also ==
- List of Louisiana Natural and Scenic Rivers
