= Johnson Bayou High School =

Location
- 6304 Gulf Beach Highway; Johnson Bayou, (Cameron Parish), Louisiana 70631; United States
- Coordinates: 29.7628°N 93.6973°W

Information
- Type: Public high school
- School district: Cameron Parish School Board
- Principal: Andrew Monceaux
- Staff: 18.15 (FTE)
- Enrollment: 80 (2023-24)
- Student to teacher ratio: 4.41
- Colors: Red and blue
- Athletics conference: District 4-C
- Nickname: Rebels
- Yearbook: The Rebel

Johnson Bayou High School is a senior high school (grades PK–12) in the community of Johnson Bayou, Louisiana. It is a part of the Cameron Parish School Board and serves the communities of Johnson Bayou and Holly Beach.

Johnson Bayou has the third-smallest enrollment of any high school in the state of Louisiana with 24 enrolled students in grades 9–12.

== History ==
Cameron Parish was formed in 1870 from portions of old Imperial Calcasieu Parish and Vermilion Parish. Education in this rural corner of Southwest Louisiana was challenging for early settlers, made especially so by the marshlands and waterways that make up the bulk of Cameron Parish's geography. By the 1890s there were at least ten public school houses in Cameron Parish in addition to several private schools held in homes dotted throughout the area.

Students who wished to attend high school in Johnson Bayou were bused to school in Hackberry, 35 miles away in northern Cameron Parish, until 1956, when a combined elementary/high school was built at its modern-day location on Gulf Beach Highway. The school's first mascot was the Wildcats, but around 1960, the school's sports teams became known as the Rebels. In 1984, a statue designed by a local artist commemorating General Robert E. Lee was erected on the front lawn of the high school. Representatives of the parish school board and a state senator attended the statue's dedication and members of the Sons of Confederate Veterans presented the Confederate flag.

Though very few Black families lived in Johnson Bayou during Jim Crow, any Black student in Cameron Parish seeking an education was forced to attend one-room schools held in churches scattered throughout lower Cameron Parish. Even then, those schools were centered around the communities of Cameron and Creole, some 25 miles and a ferry ride away. There was no education option for Black students beyond tenth grade at the time. In 1957, the Cameron Parish School Board established the Cameron Consolidated School in Creole though this school would be destroyed just months later by Hurricane Audrey. A replacement school was built and dedicated as Audrey Memorial High School to honor the memory of the more than 400 lives lost in the storm. Audrey Memorial High School closed its doors in 1969 with the advent of school integration in Louisiana and Black students of Johnson Bayou and Holly Beach were able to attend Johnson Bayou High for the first time.

On July 26, 2025, principal Joni Smith died in Lafayette, Louisiana at age 58.

=== Hurricanes ===
On June 27, 1957, Hurricane Audrey made landfall just west of Johnson Bayou between the village and Sabine Pass with winds in excess of 125 miles per hour. Audrey was the deadliest hurricane in Louisiana history until Hurricane Katrina in 2005 and, though the community suffered severe damage, the Johnson Bayou school experienced only minor damage and was able to reopen by September 1957 in time for the beginning of the school year.

Four years later, Hurricane Carla sideswiped lower Cameron Parish and caused damage to the JBHS gymnasium floor.

Hurricane Rita made landfall in nearly the same location as Hurricane Audrey on September 24, 2005, bringing storm surge heights to as much as 18 feet in parts of lower Cameron Parish, including Johnson Bayou. Damage to the school, most notably a wall blown out by wind and storm surge, forced students to once again attend school in Hackberry. Donations from local industries helped the school get back on its feet, providing temporary buildings, classroom furnishings and audio-visual equipment, including a 30-station mobile laptop lab, as well as new bleachers and a new gymnasium floor to replace the ones destroyed by the storm.

Repairs were made to the school plant following Rita, but an even worse disaster for the school lay ahead. Three years later, Hurricane Ike made landfall on the Texas Gulf Coast and devastated the school once again with storm surge heights reaching at least 12–15 feet from Sabine Pass to Calcasieu Pass, including Johnson Bayou. Roughly 80 percent of the school's building was destroyed by the storm, leaving students in Johnson Bayou without a permanent school facility for almost seven years. Groundbreaking on the new school building, elevated now on storm piers, took place in January 2013. It was the last of four schools in Cameron Parish to begin the rebuilding process.

"This community has suffered a great deal including loss in population and loss of enrollment, so this is actually commitment of the school board to the future of this community that it will thrive and that's why a school needed to be again the heart of this community of Johnson Bayou," Cameron Parish Schools Superintendent Stephanie Rodrigue said at the groundbreaking. "We hope that it can endure anything that Mother Nature puts in its path."

Construction was completed on the new 64,000-square foot, $17 million facility in August 2015 and students returned to the rebuilt Johnson Bayou High School on August 12, 2015, almost seven years after Hurricane Ike.

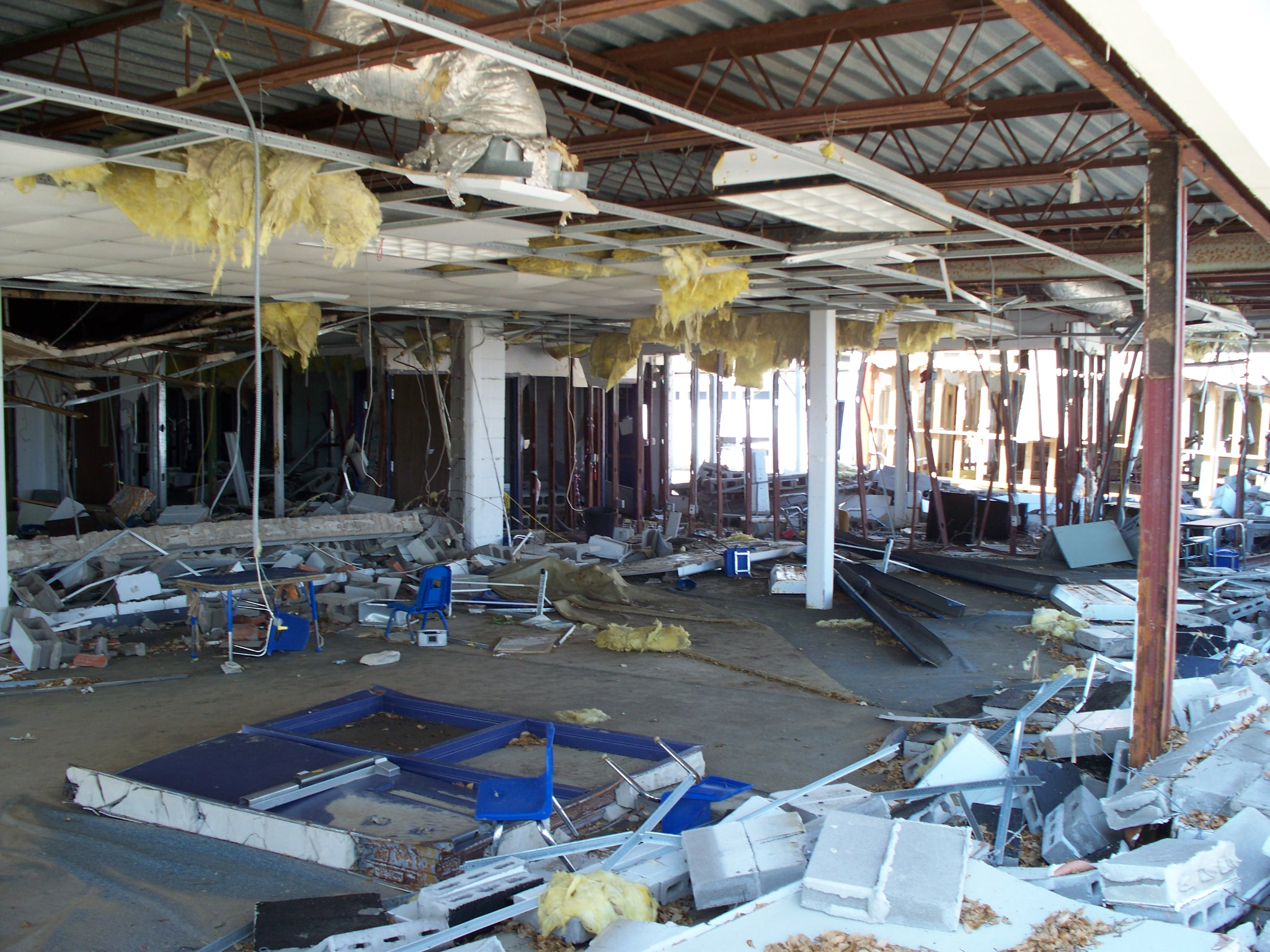
Johnson Bayou High School suffered severe damage inside building due to Hurricane Ike

The new school was put to the test in 2020 when the southwest Louisiana coast was slammed by a pair of intense hurricanes. In the early morning hours of August 27, 2020, Hurricane Laura, the most powerful hurricane to strike Louisiana since the 1856 Last Island hurricane made landfall at Cameron causing immense destruction across lower Cameron Parish. Fortunately for Johnson Bayou, the focus of the most intense damage was centered some 30 miles east of the town, sparing it the worst of the storm surge. Just six weeks later, Hurricane Delta made landfall just 12 miles east of where Hurricane Laura did, becoming the fourth hurricane to landfall in Louisiana that year. Yet despite hurricane-force winds causing some minor damage, Johnson Bayou was the first campus to completely reopen following the storms.

== Academics ==
At Johnson Bayou High School, 35% of students scored at or above the proficient level for math, which is better than both the state and district average, and 45% scored at or above that level for reading.

=== Clubs and organizations ===
- 4-H
- Beta Club
- FBLA-PBL
- Student Council
- FCCLA
- FFA

== Demographics ==
The school's minority student enrollment is 11%. The student-teacher ratio at Johnson Bayou High School is 4:1. The student population is made up of 52% female students and 48% male students. The school enrolls 61% economically disadvantaged students.

== Athletics ==
The Johnson Bayou High School Rebels compete in District 4-C of the Louisiana High School Athletics Association.

=== Sports ===
- Baseball
- Boys Basketball
- Girls Basketball
- Cheerleading
- Cross Country
- Softball
- Boys Track and Field
- Girls Track and Field
