= Louisiana Fur and Wildlife Festival =

Annual festival held in Louisiana

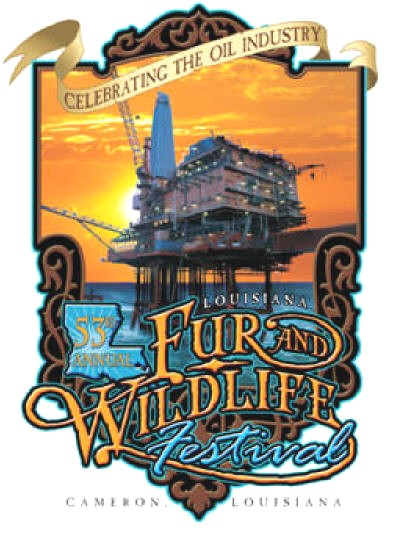
53rd annual Louisiana Fur and Wildlife Festival poster

The Louisiana Fur and Wildlife Festival is called "One of the Oldest and Coldest" festival in Louisiana. Takes place in the heart of winter, the second weekend of January. The Louisiana Fur and Wildlife Festival was chosen as a Top 20 Event by the Southeast Tourism Society in 1989, 2012 and 2013. This award is a coveted honor among 12 member states.

== Industries honored ==
The festival honors ten native industries, all vital to Cameron Parish, on a rotating basis.

- Cattle
- Energy
- Shrimp
- Hunting and Wildlife
- Fur and Alligator
- Oyster
- Fishing
- Crabbing

In conjunction with each festival, a queen's pageant is held; an individual is named King Fur to represent the industry being honored; a cookbook is published which contains photographs and winners from the previous festival; a parade is held, and the festival hosts a delegation from its sister festival, the National Outdoor Show from Cambridge MD.

Festival contests include oyster shucking, muskrat and nutria skinning, skeet shooting, trap setting, and duck and goose calling, and a Gumbo Cook-off. A booth located on the fairgrounds showcases the history of the festival. The festival also features carnival rides, exhibits, live music and dancing, and regional food.

== History ==
=== Inaugural festival ===
The event originated in 1955 when U.S. Congressman Theo Ashton Thompson arranged the first fur and wildlife competition.

The congressman of Cambridge, Maryland challenged Representative Thompson to send a local resident to compete in the National Fur Skinning Contest. Fifty-two-year-old Leon Hebert, a 25-year trapper, from Cameron was sent to the National Outdoor Show where he placed fifth in the nation that year.

A small group of people met during the summer of 1955 in the Cameron Courthouse Building, to make plans for the first festival. Whitney Stine was chairman. Representatives of community organizations included: Whitney Stine - Cameron Lion's Club ((Lions Clubs International)), Edward Swindell, Sr. - Cameron Lion's Club, Hadley Fontenot - County Agent, Alvin Dyson - State Representative, Ray Burleigh - Cameron Lion's Club, Joe O'Donnell -Cameron Lion's Club, Mrs. Iva Free - Home Demonstration Agent, Roberta Rogers - Home Demonstration Club, Geneva Griffith - Home Demonstration Club and Sam Tarlton - Lake Charles Television and Radio Station.

From this group of organizers came the Louisiana Fur & Wildlife Festival. The first festival was funded by the Cameron Parish Police Jury and private donations. This was to become known as "ONE OF THE OLDEST AND COLDEST FESTIVALS IN LOUISIANA" In 1962 and 1973 the festival was postponed for one week due to a severe cold wave.

Jennings B. Jones, Jr. served as master of ceremonies for the program on Dec 2 and 3, 1955. It was presided over by Cameron County Agent Hadley Fontenot, first festival president.

Seventeen-year-old Vida Bess Brown, from Abbeville, was crowned "Miss Outdoor of Louisiana" by Ted O'Neal, Chief of the Fur and Bottoms Division of the Louisiana Wildlife Commission. She was presented with a nutria stole, a bouquet of roses by the Cameron Service Garage, and an expense paid trip to the National Outdoors Show in Cambridge, Maryland. The National Outdoor Show became a "Sister Festival" with the Cameron Festival. The two exchanged fur skinners and festival queens each year and the tradition continues today.

Of 34 contestants, Meredith Giles was named the first "Cameron Parish Queen". Eleven-year-old J. A. Miller captured the Louisiana Junior Duck Calling contest and in years to come he became the World Champion Fur Skinner, following in the footsteps of his father Fletcher, and teaching his daughter Selika the art with her becoming the Women's Champion. His wife, Mary Jane Miller, held the Local and National Women's title many times.

=== Second festival ===
The second annual festival was held on January 11–12, 1957 and $5000.00 in cash and trips were awarded along with fur coats to the Fur Queen contestants. Nancy Precht was crowned Fur Queen by Louisiana House of Representative, Alvin Dyson. She represented the festival at the Mardi Gras Ball in Washington, D.C. where she was presented to Vice-President and Mrs. Nixon. This tradition continues to the present time.

Floats were usually constructed in warehouses of the local menhaden plants, mud houses, garages, or anywhere workers could get out of the cold. Roland "Bolo" Trosclair was in charge of the parade at that time.

A raccoon was chosen as mascot for the festival. A contest of the area school children determined that Sha-oui would be the name of the mascot.

In Dec 1956, festival authorities invited major fur production parishes to attend; St Charles, St Bernard, St John, St. Mary, Jefferson, Plaquemines, Terrebonne, Lafourche, Iberia, Vermilion and Cameron.

=== Subsequent festivals ===
In 1969 the first King Fur is selected. King Fur I, Jack T. Styron represents the Menhaden (pogy fish) industry for the 14th annual Fur and Wildlife Festival.

In 1972 the first Fur Festival Cookbook is published and continues today.

Parishes with invitations to compete for the Louisiana Fur and Wildlife Festival Queen Crown: Acadia, Allen, Ascension, Assumption, Avoyelles, Beauregard, Calcasieu, Cameron, Evangeline, Iberia, Jefferson, Jefferson Davis, Lafayette, Lafourche, Livingston, Natchitoches, Plaquemines, Rapides, Saint Bernard, Saint Charles, Saint James, Saint John the Baptist, Saint Landry, Saint Martin, Saint Mary, Saint Tammany, Sabine, Vermillion, Vernon, Washington, Tangipahoa, and Terrebonne.

Cameron Elementary School was the annual staging ground for the Louisiana Fur and Wildlife Festival pageants until Hurricane Rita. After the 2005 storm, all that remain of the auditorium were the steel girders. The festival was canceled in 2006 due to the devastation of Hurricane Rita.

Activities for the 2007 50th annual Louisiana Fur and Wildlife Festival kicked off with pageants at the Lake Charles Civic Center's Rosa Hart Theater. The festival activities returned to the grounds of the old Cameron Elementary School in Cameron.

The Fur queen invited several of her fellow festival queens to see her Parish anyway, both in its devastation and its natural splendor.

In the early months of 2010, the Cameron Parish 4-H Junior Leaders complete a video documentary on the history of the Louisiana Fur and Wildlife Festival. The Youth Leaders interviewed past festival participants, contestants and queens and compiled the stories into a documentary. Cameron Communications is a Festival $5,000 corporate sponsor now and in the next several years.

The 54th annual Fur and Wildlife Festival held January 13–14, 2012 in downtown Cameron LA featured dog trials, back for the first time since Hurricane Rita.

With the 2020 hurricanes, Laura and Delta, and the COVID-19 pandemic causing 2021 to go on hiatus, the 63rd was deferred to 2022.

The 63rd Louisiana Fur and Wildlife Festival was held January 8, 2022 at the Burton Complex in Lake Charles, Louisiana.

The 64th Louisiana Fur and Wildlife Festival returned January 13-14, 2023 to the Historic Cameron Courthouse fairgrounds in Cameron, Louisiana.

== List of festivals ==
Year	Festival President	Fur King	Industry Honored	Fur King	Fur Queen	Parish Represented	Fur Queen	Miss Cameron Parish
1955	Hadley Fontenot				Vida Bess Brown	Vermillion	I	Meredith Giles
1957 Jan	Hadley Fontenot				Nancy Precht	Cameron	II	Nancy Precht‡
1958	Festival canceled due to the devastation of Hurricane Audrey.							
1959	Hadley Fontenot				Peggy Joyce Seago	Iberia	III	Marilyn Billings
1960	Hadley Fontenot				June Robicheaux	St. Mary	IV	Barbara Lane Dugas
1961	Hadley Fontenot				Debbie Ann LaBove	Cameron	V	Debbie Ann LaBove‡
1962	Hadley Fontenot				Pat O'Neil	Vermillion	VI	Beverly Sue Rutherford
1963	Hadley Fontenot				Susan Bienvenue	Terrebonne	VII	Pamela Riggs
1964	Hadley Fontenot				Gail Catherine Broussard	Iberia	VIII	Judy Hebert
1965	Hadley Fontenot				Susan Arcement	Vermillion	IX	Elaine Broussard
1966	Hadley Fontenot				Schere Saia	Terrebonne	X	Susan Kornegay
1967	Hadley Fontenot				Linda Trappey	Iberia	XI	Charlene LaBove
1968	Jennings B. Jones, Jr.				Nancy Lea Jordan	Plaquemines	XII	Diane Warren
1969	Jennings B. Jones, Jr.	Jack T. Styron	Menhaden	I	Jane Weilbaecher	St. Charles	XIII	Sherry Cheramie
1970	Jennings B. Jones, Jr.	Alvin Dyson	Fur	II	Doylene Lasiter	St. Mary	XIV	Cherie Griffith‡
1971	Jennings B. Jones, Jr.	Mark Richard	Cattle	III	Cherie Kay Griffith	Cameron	XV	Janet Gail Riggs‡
1972	Jennings B. Jones, Jr.	John Paul Crain	Oil	IV	Janet Gail Riggs	Cameron	XVI	Peggy Ann Kelley
1973	Jennings B. Jones, Jr.	Tom Steed	Shrimp	V	Gwendolyn Phelps	Lafourche	XVII	Debbie Precht
1974	Jennings B. Jones, Jr.	Charles W. Hebert	Rice	VI	Ann Elizabeth Guillot	St. John the Baptist	XVIII	Susan Baccigalopi
1975	Jennings B. Jones, Jr.	Jerry Jones	Hunting	VII	Alexis Alexander	Jefferson	XIX	Susan Woodgett‡
1976	Jennings B. Jones, Jr.	J. Burton Daigle	Centennial King	VIII	Susan Woodgett	Cameron	XX	Vickie Nunez
1977	Jennings B. Jones, Jr.	Ted Joanen	Alligator	IX	Jenny Bird	St Charles	XXI	Nancy Claire Nunez
1978	Jennings B. Jones, Jr.	Patrick Doody	Menhadden	X	Sharon Laney	St. Charles	XXII	"| Joni Gray‡
1979	Jennings B. Jones, Jr.	Fletcher Miller	Fur	XI	Joni Gray	Cameron	XXIII	Mary Diane McCall
1980	Braxton Blake	Conway LeBleu	Cattle	XII	Cindy Rice	St. John the Baptist	XXIV	Laura Hicks
1981	Braxton Blake	Hadley A Fontenot & J.B. Jones	25TH Anniversary	XIII	Donna Harmon	Calcasieu	XXV	Yvonne Marie Savoie‡
1982	J. Braxton Blake	Charles "Buster" Rogers	Oil	XIV	Yvonne Savoie	Cameron	XXVI	April Leger
1983	Braxton Blake	Roland Trosclair Jr.	Shrimp	XV	Andria Marie Bergeron	Terrebonne	XXVII	Wendy Wigley
1984	Braxton Blake	Charles H. Precht Sr.	Rice	XVI	Elizabeth Primm	Terrebonne	XXVIII	Selika Miller‡
1985	Braxton Blake	Lyle "Butch" Crain	Hunting and Wildlife	XVII	Selika Miller	Cameron	XXIX	Stacy Mudd
1986	Braxton Blake	Benny Welch	Alligator	XVIII	Kelly Foster	Calcasieu	XXX	Shontel Blanchard
1987	Braxton Blake	Edward Wallace Swindell Jr	Menhaden	XIX	Lisa Roberts†	Iberia	XXXI	Dena Dawn Rutherford
1988	Hayes "Pete" Picou, Jr	Tom Mudd	Fur	XX	Karen Engeron	Terrebonne	XXXII	Kathryn Leigh Wilkerson
1989	Hayes "Pete" Picou, Jr	J.B. Meaux	Cattle	XXI	Michele Irene Morris	Lafourche	XXXIII	Rhonda Jennifer Perry
1990	Hayes "Pete" Picou, Jr	Joseph Braxton Blake	Oil	XXII	Lisa Rousse	Terrebonne	XXXVI	Dayna Elaine Willis
1991	Hayes "Pete" Picou, Jr	Phillip Trosclair	Shrimp	XXIII	Sonia Landry	Iberia	XXXV	Rene Rachelle LaLande
1992	Hayes "Pete" Picou, Jr	Claude Eagleson	Rice	XXIV	Kelley Marie Becnell	St. John the Baptist	XXXVI	Brandi Brice Soileau
1993	Hayes "Pete" Picou, Jr	Watkins Miller	Wildlife	XXV	Belinda "Denise" Clemons	St. Tammany	XXXVII	Tracie Marie Trahan
1994	Hayes "Pete" Picou, Jr	Larry McNeese	Alligator	XXVI	Erika Schwarz	St. Tammany	XXXVIII	Adrienne Larissa Picou‡
1995	Hayes "Pete" Picou, Jr	Billy Doxey	Oyster	XXVII	Adrienne Picou	Cameron	XXXIX	Jennifer Leigh Broadus
1996	Hayes "Pete" Picou, Jr	Robert James Schwak	Menhaden	XXVIII	Marie Elise Des Ormeaux	Vermillion	XL	Adenise Michelle Trosclair
1997	Hayes "Pete" Picou, Jr	Darryl "Fats" Dupont	Fur	XXIX	Alison Hotard	Iberia	XLI	Melissa Ann Trahan
1998	Hayes "Pete" Picou, Jr	Charlie Theriot	Cattle	XXX	Summer Leigh Parker†	Jefferson Davis	XLII	Heather Sturlese‡
1999	Clifton Hebert	Norman McCall	Oil	XXXI	Heather Sturlese	Cameron	XLIII	Amanda Broussard
2000	Clifton Hebert	Don Bailey	Shrimp	XXXII	Millie Manning Harris	Jefferson	XLIV	Courtney Nicole Conner
2001	Clifton Hebert	Mervin "Possum" Chesson	Rice	XXXIII	Courtney Tatman†	St. Charles	XLV	Shannon Suratt
2002	Clifton Hebert	Enos Joseph "Buster" Sturlese	Hunting	XXXIV	Shannon Hinton	St. John the Baptist	XLVI	Marylyn Alexis LeJeune
2003	Johnny LeBlanc	Charles Pettiford	Alligator	XXXV	Tiffany Wing	Calcasieu	XLVII	Trista Semien‡
2004	Johnny LeBlanc	Jimmie Stutes	Oyster	XXXVI	Trista Zanora Semien	Cameron	XLVIII	Ashley Picou
2005	Johnny LeBlanc	James "JA"Miller	Menhaden	XXXVII	Cadi Brook Pedigo	Acadia	XLIX	Ashley Kelly
2006	Festival canceled due to the devastation of Hurricane Rita.							
2007	Johnny LeBlanc	Rolland Primeaux	50TH Anniversary	XXXVIII	Kayla Lavergne	Vermilion	L	Haley Willis
2008	Johnny LeBlanc	John R. "Nunu" Baccigalopi	Fur	XXXIX	Lauren Naquin	Vermilion	LI	Kami Savoie
2009	Festival canceled due to the devastation of Hurricane Ike.							
2010	Penelope Richard	Billy Doland	Cattle	XL	Jada O'Blanc†	Vermilion	LII	Mikalee Mooney**
2011	Penelope Richard	Lee Harrison	Oil	XLI	Sarah Deanna Tinsler	Acadia	LIII	Katelyn Reina
2012	Penelope Richard	Elmer Peshoff	Shrimp	XLII	Mikalee Mooney	Beauregard	LIV	Kathryn Reina‡
2013	Penelope Richard	Clifford Broussard	Farming	XLIII	Kathryn Reina	Cameron	LV	Juliann Lannin
2014	Penelope Richard	Huey Mhire	Hunting	XLIV	Carly Chaumont	Evangeline	LVI	Katie Little
2015	Telesha Bertrand	Guthrie Perry	Fur and Alligator	XLV	Haleigh Willis	Evangeline	LVII	Morgan Hardie
2016	Telesha Bertrand	Adley Leo Dyson Sr.	Oyster	XLVI	Julian Devillier †	Acadia	LVIII	Baylie Duhon
2017	Telesha Bertrand	Loston McEvers	Fishing	XLVII	Kristal Marie Breaux*	St. Charles	LIX	Savanna Boudreaux
2018	Telesha Bertrand	"Sugarboy" Miller	Crabbing	XLVIII	Sydney Richardelle	Calcasieu	LX	Maeleigh Conner
2019	Telesha Bertrand	J.C. Reina	Cattle	XLIX	Hali Westerman	Lafourche	LXI	Alivia Mudd‡
2020	Telesha Bertrand	Willard "Yank" Savoie	Energy	L	Alivia Mudd	Cameron	LXII	Maddy Grayce Gordon
2021	Cancelled due to COVID-19 pandemic and devastation of Hurricane Laura and Hurricane Delta.							
2022	Telesha Bertrand	Robert “Buster” McKoin	Shrimp	LI	Gabrielle Guilbeau	Vermillion	LXIII	Cesilee Oliver
2023	Telesha Bertrand	Carol "Zeke" Wainwright	Hunting and Wildlife	LII	Jordyn Kelley †	Calcasieu	LXIV	Hadley Lemons
2024	Telesha Bertrand	Howard Romero	Fur and Alligator	LIII	Jadyn Devillier	St. Martin	LXV	Makala Snyder
2025	Telesha Bertrand	Ruben Doxey	Oyster	LIV	Ashley Gorrell	Evangeline	LXVI	Sydney Waters

†	LAFF QUEEN OF QUEENS / LAFF QUEEN (Representing The Louisiana Fur and Wildlife Festival)
‡	FUR QUEEN (Representing Cameron Parish)
*	LAFF QUEEN OF QUEENS / LAFF QUEEN (Representing Another Festival)
**	FUR QUEEN (Representing Another Parish)

Parish	Winners	Years
Cameron	13	1957, 1961, 1971, 1972, 1976, 1979, 1982, 1985, 1995, 1999, 2004, 2013, 2020
Vermillion	8	1956, 1962, 1965, 1996, 2007, 2008, 2010, 2022
Terrebonne	6	1963, 1966, 1983, 1984, 1988, 1990,
Calcasieu	5	1981, 1986, 2003, 2018, 2023
Iberia	5	1959, 1964, 1967, 1987, 1991
St. Charles	5	1969, 1977, 1978, 2001, 2017
St. John the Baptist	5	1974, 1980, 1992, 1997, 2002
Acadia	3	2005, 2011, 2016
Evangeline	3	2014, 2015, 2025
Lafourche	3	1973, 1989, 2019
Jefferson	2	1975, 2000
St. Mary	2	1960, 1970
St. Tammany	2	1993, 1994
Beauregard	1	2012
Jefferson Davis	1	1998
Plaquemines	1	1968
St. Martin	1	2024
