= Cameron, Louisiana =

- Census-designated place
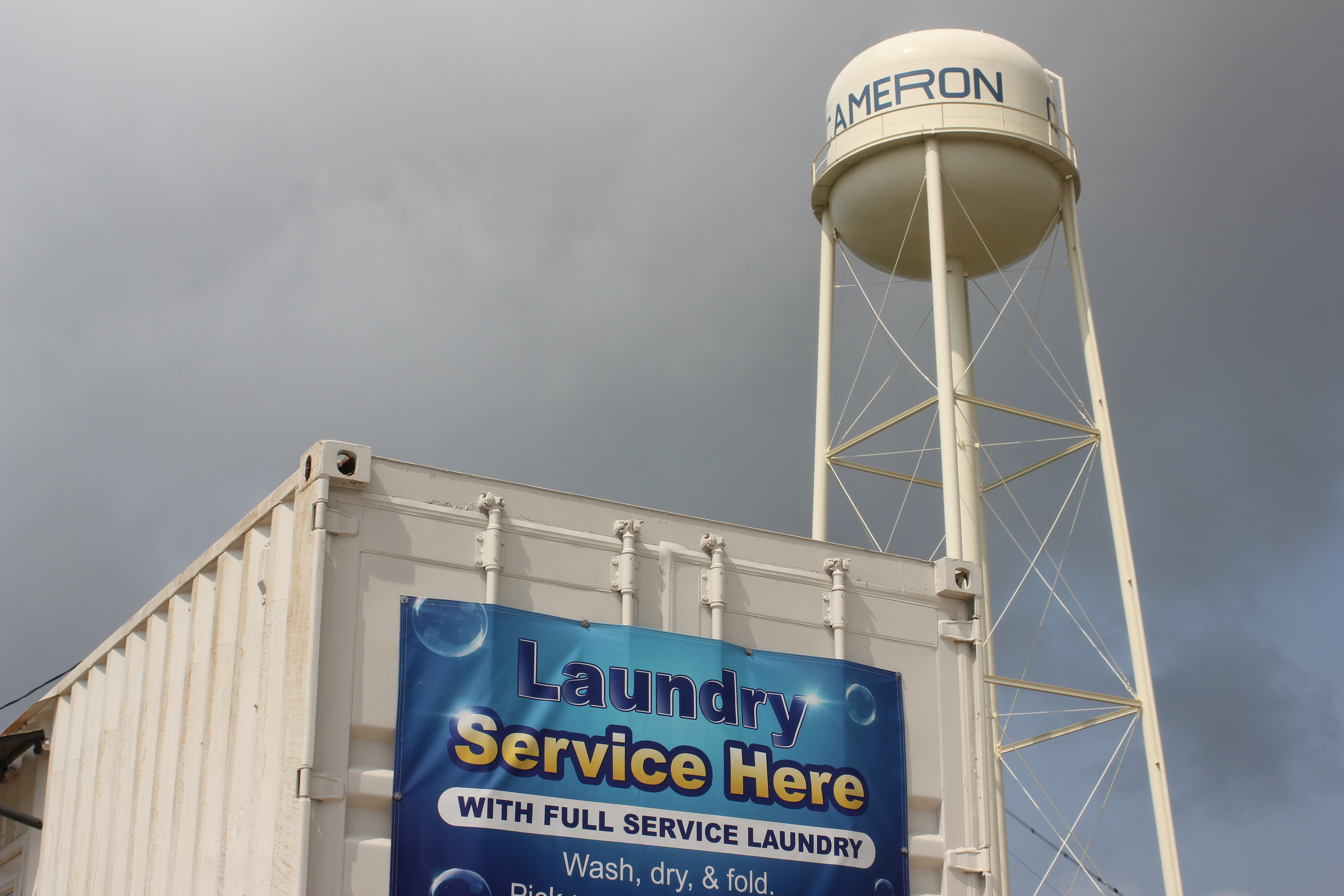

- Location of Cameron in Louisiana Cameron, Louisiana (the United States)
- Coordinates: 29°47′45″N 93°19′15″W
- Country: United States
- State: Louisiana
- Parish: Cameron

Area
  - Total: 12.60 sq mi (32.64 km^{2})
  - Land: 11.43 sq mi (29.60 km^{2})
  - Water: 1.17 sq mi (3.04 km^{2})
- Elevation: 3 ft (0.91 m)

Population (2020)
  - Total: 315
  - Density: 27.6/sq mi (10.64/km^{2})
- Time zone: UTC-6 (CST)
  - Summer (DST): UTC-5 (CDT)
- Zip code: 70631
- Area code: 337
- FIPS code: 22-12000
- GNIS feature ID: 2402743

Cameron is a census-designated place (CDP) in and the parish seat of Cameron Parish, Louisiana, United States. It is part of the Lake Charles Metropolitan Statistical Area. After sustaining extreme damage from Hurricane Rita in 2005 and Hurricane Ike in 2008, as of the 2020 census Cameron had a population of 315.

== History ==
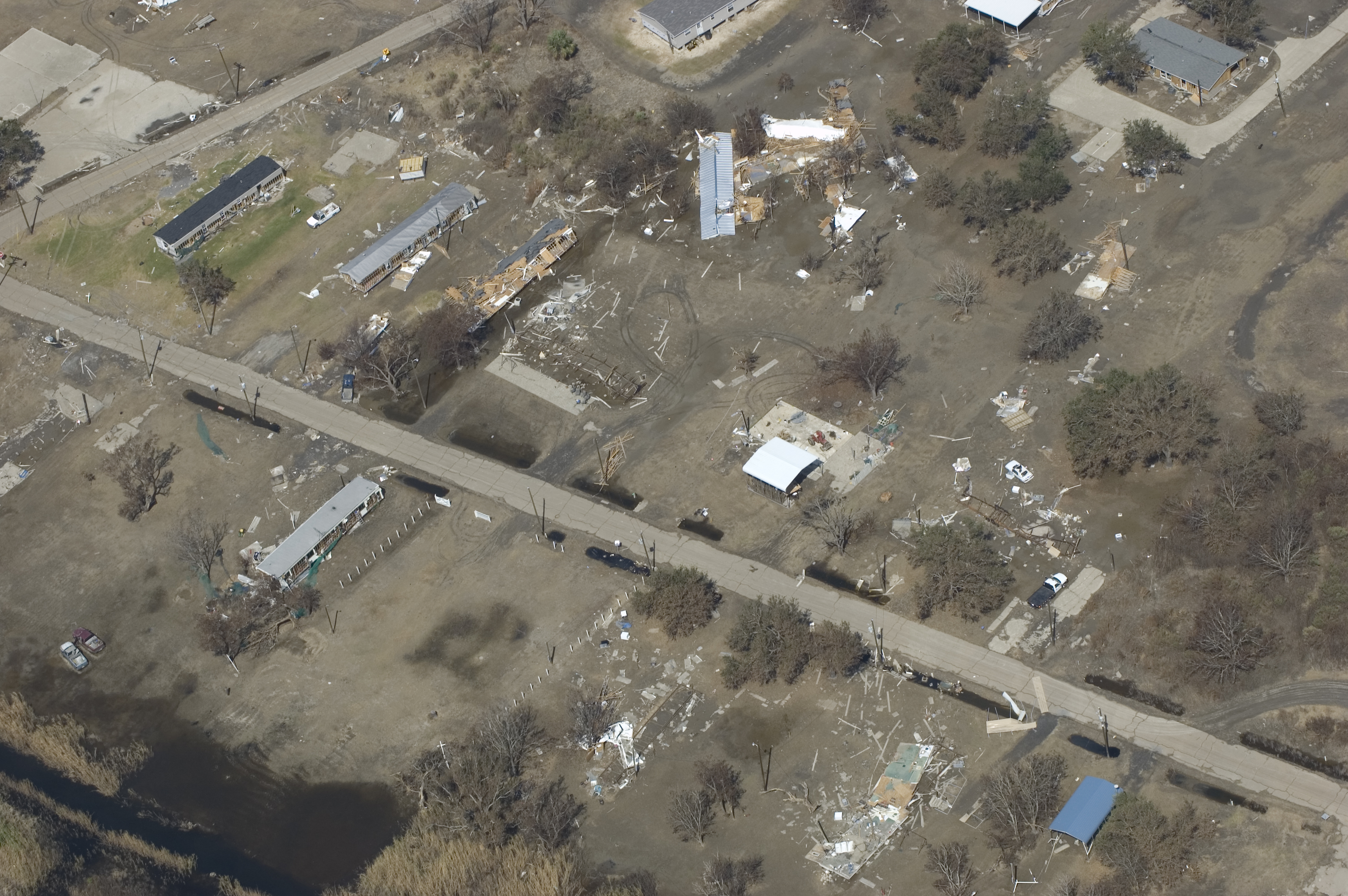
Aerial view of Hurricane Ike's destruction of Cameron Parish, captured on September 23, 2008.

The town of Cameron was originally called Leesburg, although the post office was designated Cameron, like the parish. Its location at the mouth of the Calcasieu River made it a transhipment location for mail, cattle, and other goods to be taken by ship to Lake Charles. After the sinking of the first successful oil well in Louisiana in 1901, Cameron became a center of petroleum extraction.

In 1957, Cameron was nearly destroyed by Hurricane Audrey. A storm surge of 12 feet (3.7 m) and winds of 125 miles per hour (201 km/h) devastated nearby oilfields and caused the deaths of more than 300 residents of the town.

Nearly fifty years later, in late September 2005, Hurricane Rita hit Cameron with 120-mile-per-hour (190 km/h) winds and the highest storm surges ever recorded in the state, 17.8 feet (5.4 m) at Cameron and possibly 18 feet (5.5 m) in some locations. Much of the town was destroyed, but everyone had evacuated beforehand.

On September 13, 2008, Hurricane Ike leveled Cameron with a 12-foot (3.7 m) storm surge while the town was still recovering from Rita in 2005. Ike destroyed more than 90 percent of the homes in the parish seat and caused catastrophic flooding in every part of the parish.

After Rita and Ike, the parish instituted stricter building codes, and insurance rates rose dramatically, making rebuilding too expensive for many residents. The population of Cameron fell 79 percent between 2000 and 2010. By 2010, when the First Baptist Church was rebuilt, the town had lost its grocery stores and drug store and had only a gas station and a bank, and the post office and a restaurant, both housed in trailers. Most residents were still living in mobile homes. The main parish library, destroyed by Rita and again by Ike, was rebuilt on tall stilts; South Cameron Memorial Hospital, destroyed by Rita, was also rebuilt to withstand tropical storms. A new government complex was completed in 2015 but repairs to the parish courthouse were still needed.

On August 27, 2020, at 1:00 am CDT, Hurricane Laura made landfall near Cameron with maximum sustained winds of 150 miles per hour (240 km/h), a category 4 storm on the Saffir-Simpson Hurricane Wind Scale. A storm surge measured between 9 and 12 feet inundated the immediate areas surrounding Cameron according to Louisiana Governor John Bel Edwards. Much of the town was again destroyed or severely damaged, including the hospital.

Six weeks later, Hurricane Delta made landfall not too far east of Cameron as a category 2 storm. It caused further damage following Laura. Clean up from Laura was paused in preparation for Delta.

== Geography ==
Cameron is located in south-central Cameron Parish along the Gulf of Mexico at an elevation of 4 feet (1.2 m) above sea level. State highways 27 and 82 pass through the community as Marshall Street, crossing the Calcasieu Ship Channel just west of town. Highway 82 leads east 93 miles (150 km) to Abbeville and west 48 miles (77 km) to Port Arthur, Texas. Highway 27 leads west then north 48 miles (77 km) to Sulphur. Lake Charles is 52 miles (84 km) to the north.

According to the United States Census Bureau, the CDP has a total area of 12.6 square miles (32.6 km^{2}), of which 11.4 square miles (29.6 km^{2}) is land and 1.2 square miles (3.0 km^{2}), or 9.31%, is water.

=== Climate ===
Climate data for Cameron, Louisiana
Month	Jan	Feb	Mar	Apr	May	Jun	Jul	Aug	Sep	Oct	Nov	Dec	Year
Record high °F (°C)	84 (29)	80 (27)	88 (31)	93 (34)	96 (36)	100 (38)	101 (38)	103 (39)	106 (41)	98 (37)	88 (31)	88 (31)	106 (41)
Mean daily maximum °F (°C)	60.4 (15.8)	63.6 (17.6)	70.1 (21.2)	76.6 (24.8)	83.3 (28.5)	88.4 (31.3)	90.3 (32.4)	91.0 (32.8)	87.6 (30.9)	80.2 (26.8)	71.2 (21.8)	62.8 (17.1)	77.1 (25.1)
Mean daily minimum °F (°C)	43.1 (6.2)	46.3 (7.9)	52.7 (11.5)	59.8 (15.4)	68.3 (20.2)	73.8 (23.2)	75.7 (24.3)	75.2 (24.0)	70.5 (21.4)	61.3 (16.3)	52.5 (11.4)	45.0 (7.2)	60.4 (15.8)
Record low °F (°C)	13 (−11)	11 (−12)	25 (−4)	27 (−3)	44 (7)	54 (12)	61 (16)	52 (11)	45 (7)	29 (−2)	20 (−7)	12 (−11)	11 (−12)
Average precipitation inches (mm)	5.68 (144)	3.46 (88)	3.84 (98)	3.93 (100)	4.93 (125)	6.50 (165)	6.47 (164)	5.43 (138)	5.58 (142)	4.32 (110)	4.71 (120)	4.41 (112)	59.26 (1,505)
Average snowfall inches (cm)	0.1 (0.25)	0 (0)	0 (0)	0 (0)	0 (0)	0 (0)	0 (0)	0 (0)	0 (0)	0 (0)	0 (0)	0 (0)	0.1 (0.25)

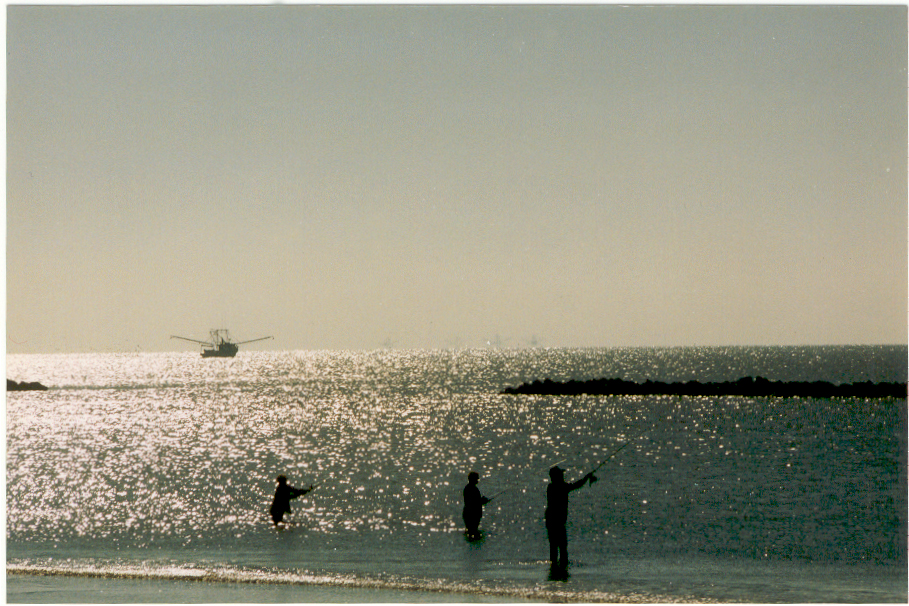
Shrimping and fishing in the Gulf

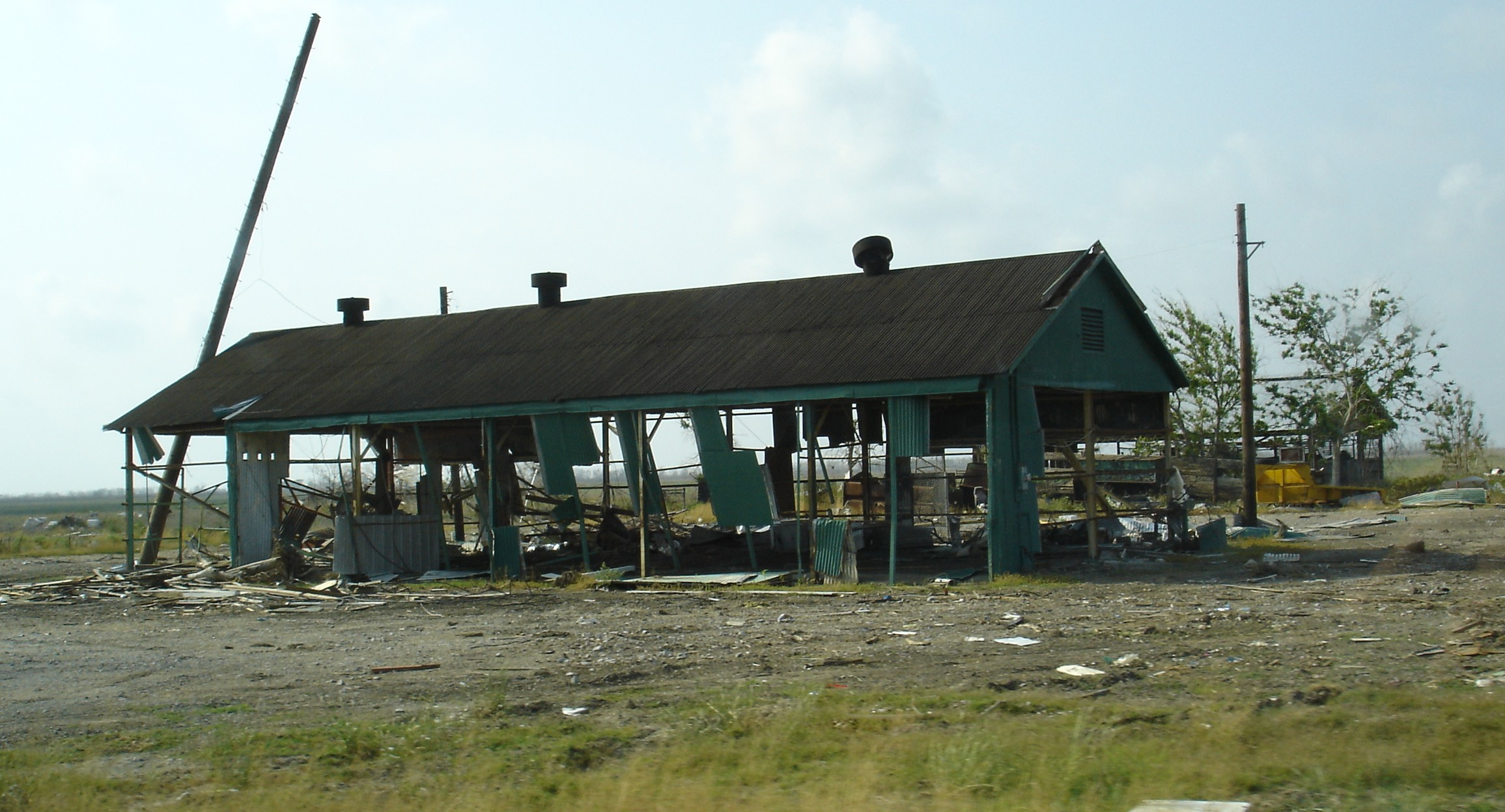
Damage in Cameron from Hurricane Rita (photo taken in April 2006)

== Demographics ==
Historical population
Census	Pop.	Note	%±
1890	941		—
1900	1,323		40.6%
1910	1,407		6.3%
1920	1,220		−13.3%
1930	1,423		16.6%
1940	2,109		48.2%
1950	2,276		7.9%
1960	2,721		19.6%
1970	3,205		17.8%
1980	1,736		−45.8%
1990	2,041		17.6%
2000	1,965		−3.7%
2010	406		−79.3%
2020	315		−22.4%
U.S. Decennial Census 1990 2000 2010

Cameron first appeared as a census designated place the 1980 U.S. Census.

As of the census of 2000, there were 1,965 people, 695 households, and 510 families residing in the CDP. The population density was 70.5 inhabitants per square mile (27.2/km^{2}). There were 800 housing units at an average density of 28.7 per square mile (11.1/km^{2}). The racial makeup of the CDP was 82.49% White, 11.86% African American, 0.56% Native American, 0.31% Asian, 0.05% Pacific Islander, 3.36% from other races, and 1.37% from two or more races. Hispanic or Latino of any race were 5.55% of the population.

There were 695 households, out of which 37.8% had children under the age of 18 living with them, 52.5% were married couples living together, 14.5% had a female householder with no husband present, and 26.6% were non-families. 21.2% of all households were made up of individuals, and 6.3% had someone living alone who was 65 years of age or older. The average household size was 2.77 and the average family size was 3.17.

In the CDP, the population was spread out, with 27.5% under the age of 18, 10.8% from 18 to 24, 31.1% from 25 to 44, 21.5% from 45 to 64, and 9.1% who were 65 years of age or older. The median age was 34 years. For every 100 females, there were 102.8 males. For every 100 females age 18 and over, there were 104.2 males.

The median income for a household in the CDP was $30,370, and the median income for a family was $33,661. Males had a median income of $24,762 versus $26,406 for females. The per capita income for the CDP was $13,499. About 17.0% of families and 19.4% of the population were below the poverty line, including 18.1% of those under age 18 and 13.6% of those age 65 or over.

== Culture ==
Cameron is on the Creole Nature Trail, a National Scenic Byway.

Cameron is home to the Louisiana Fur and Wildlife Festival held in January.

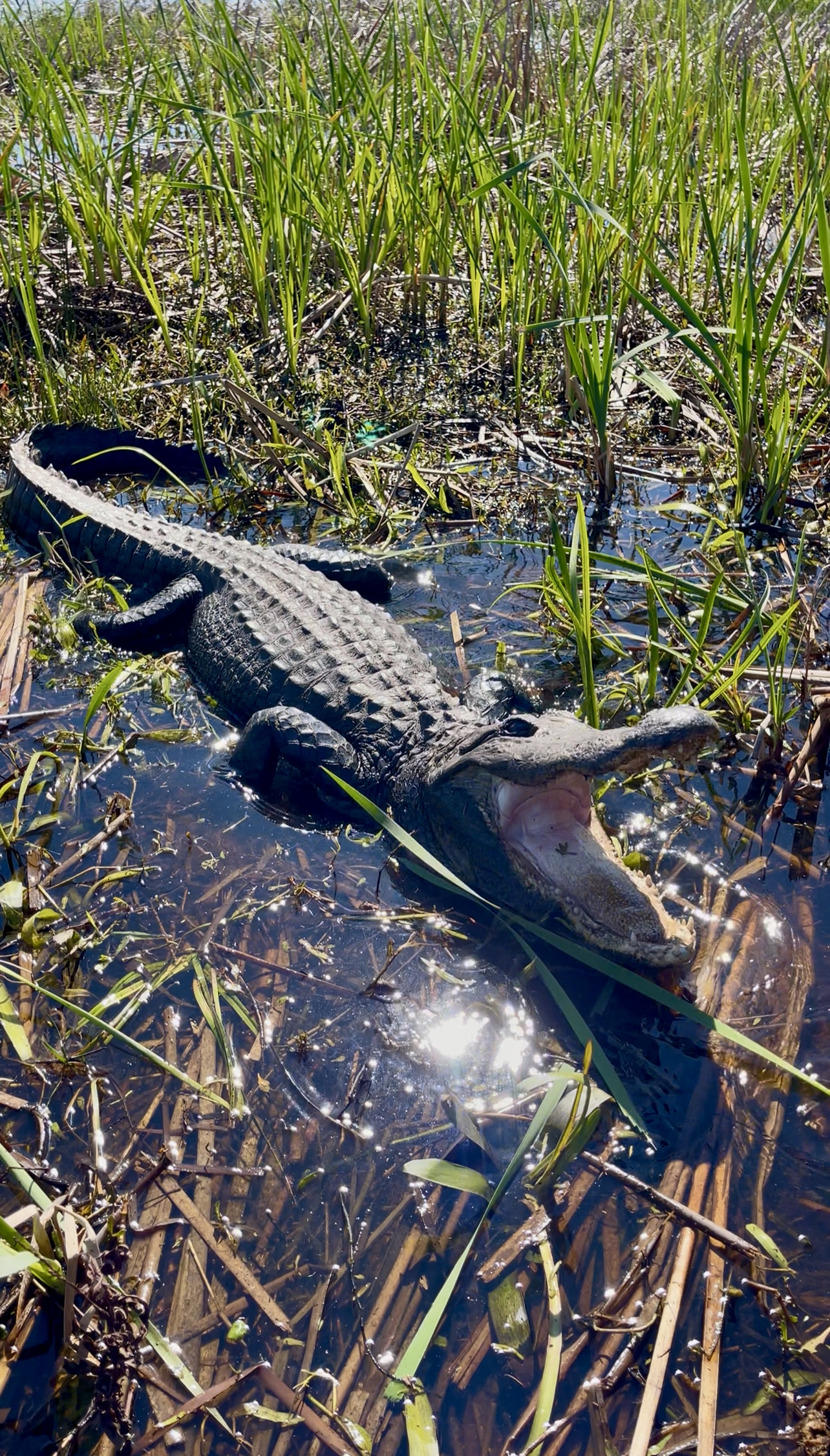
Alligator in Cameron, Louisiana

== Government ==
The United States Postal Service Cameron Post Office is located at 144 Adam Roux Street in the CDP.

== Industry ==
A project is scheduled to export up to 9 million tonnes of liquefied natural gas per year.

== Education ==
The Cameron Parish School Board serves the town.

Prior to Hurricane Rita's impact in September 2005, Cameron Elementary School served pre-kindergarten through 7th grade students, while high schoolers attended Johnson Bayou High School. Hurricane Rita damaged both schools and also South Cameron High School, a K–12 school in Creole. Students from both high schools shared Grand Lake High School's campus with Grand Lake for nearly a year. In fall 2006, using portable buildings, high school students returned to the Johnson Bayou campus while Cameron Elementary, South Cameron Elementary, and South Cameron High School students were consolidated on the South Cameron High School campus.

Hurricane Ike in 2008 caused varying degrees of damage to every school and library in Cameron Parish. Most were flooded by storm surge and sustained wind damage, and as a result, all schools were closed. Four new schools were built over the following seven years, the last being a new Johnson Bayou High School near Cameron.

The Cameron Parish Public Library operated the main Cameron Parish Library in Cameron. As of 2024 negative effects from a hurricane mean the library is not open. The current building opened after a previous one was razed by Hurricane Ike, with yet another one razed by Hurricane Rita before it. In 2020 Rick Rojas of The New York Times described the current library as "like a fortress on stilts". For a period beginning on April 1, 2010, the ex-Wendell Electric and Hardware Store served as the library.

Cameron Parish is in the service area of Sowela Technical Community College.
