= South Cameron High School =

High school in Louisiana, United States

Location
- 753 Oak Grove Highway; Creole, (Cameron Parish), Louisiana 70643; United States; 29.7860°N 93.1065°W

Information
- Type: Public high school
- School district: Cameron Parish School Board
- Principal: Lindsey Fontenot
- Staff: 27.93 (on an FTE basis)
- Enrollment: 156 (2023–24)
- Student to teacher ratio: 5.59
- Colors: Red and blue
- Mascot: Tarpon
- Nickname: Tarpons
- Yearbook: The Tarpon

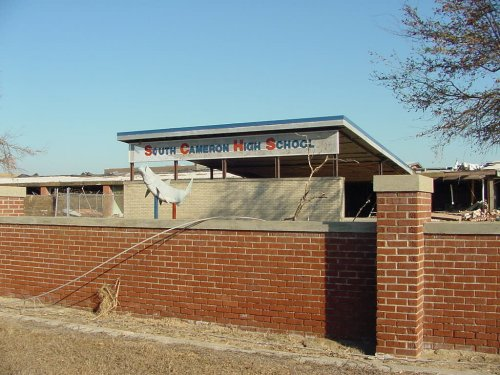
South Cameron High School after Hurricane Rita

South Cameron High School is a public primary and secondary school in unincorporated Cameron Parish, Louisiana, United States. The school, a part of the Cameron Parish School Board, has grades Kindergarten through 12.

South Cameron High School serves students from the Cameron, Creole, and Grand Chenier communities.

== History ==
At one point in time, South Cameron High School served area high schoolers while nearby South Cameron Elementary School served grades Pre-Kindergarten through 7. In September 2005, Hurricane Rita swept through Cameron Parish, damaging South Cameron Elementary, Cameron Elementary, and South Cameron High. The South Cameron Elementary, Cameron Elementary, and South Cameron High students shared Grand Lake High School's campus with Grand Lake for almost an entire year. In fall 2006, the three schools consolidated with all students going to the South Cameron High School campus.

== School uniforms ==
Students are required to wear school uniforms.

== Athletics ==
South Cameron High athletics competes in the LHSAA.
