= Grand Chenier, Louisiana =

Unincorporated community in Louisiana, U.S.

Coordinates: 29°46′01″N 92°58′31″W

Grand Chenier (French: Grand'Chênière, pronounced [grɑ̃ ʃɛ̃jær]) is an unincorporated community in Cameron Parish, Louisiana, United States. Its population is estimated at 352. Its ZIP code is 70643.

St. Eugene Catholic Church in Grand Chenier, which is affiliated with the Roman Catholic Diocese of Lake Charles, was established in 1961 by the Most Reverend Maurice Schexnayder, then the Bishop of Lafayette.

The McCall Cemetery in Grand Chenier is named for a pioneer Cameron Parish family. Dr. Milledge McCall and his wife, the former Sarah Bray Martin, were the first permanent settlers in Grand Chenier. One of their descendants, Thomas W. McCall, was the Cameron Parish school superintendent for forty years. Conway LeBleu, a son-in-law of Thomas McCall, was the state representative for Cameron Parish from 1964 to 1988. LeBleu and his wife, the former Virgie Annie McCall (1918-2016), one of the founders of the Cameron Parish Library, are interred at the McCall Cemetery.

== Education ==
Cameron Parish School Board is the school district for all of the parish. South Cameron High School has a Grand Chenier address.

The Cameron Parish Library system operated the Grand Chenier Branch. As of 2024 negative effects from a hurricane mean that the library is not open.
