= Hackberry High School =

Location
- 1390 School Street; Hackberry, (Cameron Parish), Louisiana 70645; United States
- Coordinates: 29.98337°N 93.3745°W

Information
- Type: Public high school
- School district: Cameron Parish School Board
- Principal: Jimmy Witherwax
- Staff: 24.99 (on an FTE basis)
- Enrollment: 210 (2023-24)
- Student to teacher ratio: 8.40
- Colors: Kelly green, white, and black
- Mascot: Mustang
- Nickname: Mustangs

Hackberry High School is a K-12 school located in Hackberry, Louisiana. It is part of the Cameron Parish School Board.

== Athletics ==
Hackberry High athletics competes in the LHSAA. The male and female teams are the Mustangs and Lady Mustangs respectively.
