= Landfall =

Event of a storm moving over land after being over water

Hurricane Maria losing its characteristic structure after making landfall in Puerto Rico

Landfall is the event of a storm moving over land after being over water. More broadly, and in relation to human travel, it refers to 'the first land that is reached or seen at the end of a journey across the sea or through the air, or the fact of arriving there.'

== Tropical cyclone ==
Hurricane Laura making landfall in Cameron, Louisiana as a Category 4 storm

A tropical cyclone is classified as making landfall when the center of the storm moves across the coast; in a relatively strong tropical cyclone, this is when the center of its eye moves over land. This is where most of the damage occurs within a mature tropical cyclone, such as a typhoon or hurricane, as most of the damaging aspects of these systems are concentrated near the eyewall. Such effects include the peaking of the storm surge, the core of strong winds coming ashore, and heavy flooding rains. These coupled with high surf can cause major beach erosion. When a tropical cyclone makes landfall, the eye usually closes in upon itself due to negative environmental factors over land, such as friction with the terrain, which causes surf to decrease, and drier continental air. Maximum sustained winds will naturally decrease as the cyclone moves inland due to frictional differences between water and land with the free atmosphere.

Landfall is distinct from a direct hit. A direct hit is where the core of high winds (or eyewall) comes onshore but the center of the storm may stay offshore. The effects of this may be quite similar to landfall, as this term is used when the radius of maximum wind within a tropical cyclone moves ashore. These effects are high surf, heavy rains that may cause flooding, minor storm surge, coastal erosion, high winds, and possibly severe thunderstorms with tornadoes around the periphery.

== Tornado or waterspout ==
When a tornadic waterspout makes landfall, it is reclassified as a tornado, which can subsequently cause damage to areas inland. When a fair weather waterspout makes landfall, it usually dissipates quickly due to friction and a reduction in the amount of warm air supplied to the funnel.

== See also ==
- Rainband
