= Grand Lake High School =

High school in Louisiana, United States

Location
- 1039 Louisiana Highway 384; Grand Lake, (Cameron Parish), Louisiana 70607; United States; 30.015622°N 93.188266°W

Information
- Type: Public high school
- Motto: "Hornets Lead with PRIDE"
- School district: Cameron Parish School Board
- Principal: Jessica Aguillard
- Staff: 29.65 (FTE)
- Enrollment: 349 (2023-2024)
- Student to teacher ratio: 11.77
- Colors: Maroon, gold and white
- Athletics conference: District 1A
- Mascot: Hornet
- Nickname: Hornets
- Yearbook: The Hornet

Grand Lake High School is a public grade 7-12 secondary school in Grand Lake, Louisiana, an unincorporated town in Cameron Parish, Louisiana, United States. The school, a part of the Cameron Parish School Board, previously had all grades Pre-Kindergarten through 12.

== History ==
In September 2005, Hurricane Rita swept through Cameron Parish, damaging Cameron Elementary, South Cameron Elementary, and South Cameron High. The South Cameron students shared Grand Lake High School's campus with Grand Lake for almost an entire year. the South Cameron elementary and high school students moved into the South Cameron High School campus by fall 2006.

== School uniforms ==
Navy and khaki uniform bottoms and white or navy tops.

== Athletics ==
Grand Lake High athletics compete in the LHSAA.

=== State Championships ===
Softball

- (1) 2005

=== State Runners-Up ===
Baseball

- (3) 2017, 2021, 2022

Football

- (1) 2020

Softball

- (1) 2008
