= Hackberry, Louisiana =

- Census-designated place
- Location of Hackberry in Louisiana
- Coordinates: 29°59′21″N 93°23′50″W
- Country: United States
- State: Louisiana
- Parish: Cameron

Area
  - Total: 34.49 sq mi (89.32 km^{2})
  - Land: 28.08 sq mi (72.72 km^{2})
  - Water: 6.41 sq mi (16.60 km^{2})
- Elevation: 0 ft (0 m)

Population (2020)
  - Total: 926
  - Density: 33.0/sq mi (12.73/km^{2})
- Time zone: UTC-6 (CST)
  - Summer (DST): UTC-5 (CDT)
- Area code: 337
- FIPS code: 22-32405
- GNIS feature ID: 2402559

Hackberry is an unincorporated community and census-designated place (CDP) in Cameron Parish, Louisiana, United States. As of the 2020 census, Hackberry had a population of 926. The population had previously declined due to extensive damage from hurricanes Rita and Ike in 2005 and 2008, respectively. It is part of the Lake Charles Metropolitan Statistical Area.

== History ==
The community of Hackberry was heavily damaged by Hurricane Ike in September 2008. Ike's 22-foot (6.7 m) storm surge crawled 60 miles (97 km) inland and devastated Hackberry. The small community was flooded by the high storm surge and all structures (houses, churches, buildings, etc.) were affected. Flooding caused by the hurricane killed many cattle and other farm animals. The community also suffered severe damage in Hurricane Rita, in 2005, and again suffered severe damage due to the landfall of Category 4 Hurricane Laura in the late evening and early morning of August 27, 2020, Hackberry being within the eyewall of the storm.

== Geography ==
Hackberry is located in north-central Cameron Parish on the west side of Calcasieu Lake. Louisiana Highway 27 passes through the CDP, leading north 17 miles (27 km) to Sulphur and south 20 miles (32 km) to Holly Beach on the Gulf of Mexico.

According to the United States Census Bureau, the Hackberry CDP has a total area of 34.5 square miles (89.3 km^{2}), of which 28.1 square miles (72.7 km^{2}) is land and 6.4 square miles (16.6 km^{2}), or 18.59%, is water.

=== Climate ===
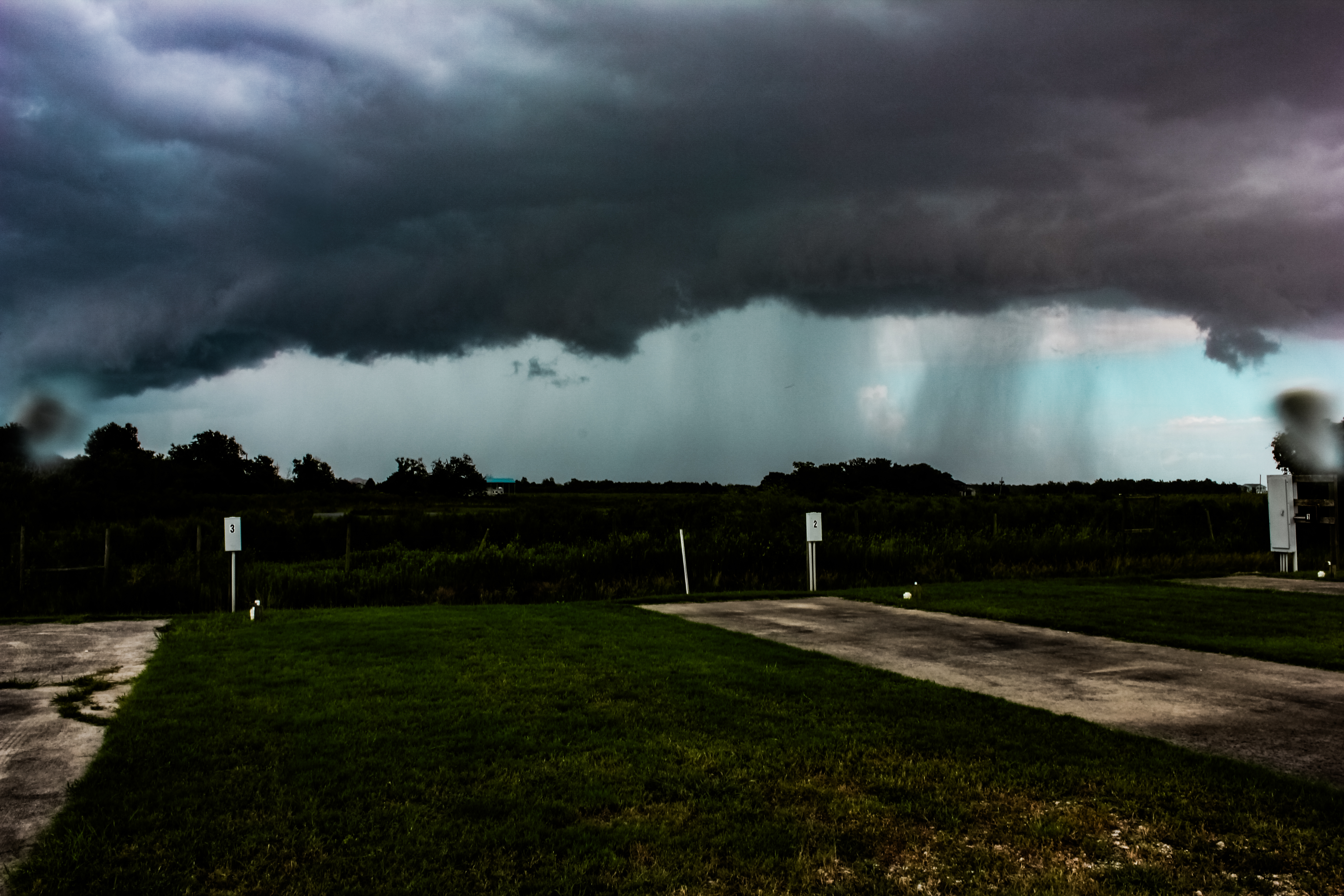
Storm in Hackberry

The climate in this area is characterized by hot, humid summers and generally mild to cool winters. According to the Köppen Climate Classification system, Hackberry has a humid subtropical climate, abbreviated "Cfa" on climate maps.

== Demographics ==
Historical population
Census	Pop.	Note	%±
1920	247		—
1930	908		267.6%
1940	1,350		48.7%
1950	1,208		−10.5%
1960	1,183		−2.1%
1970	1,335		12.8%
1980	1,601		19.9%
1990	1,664		3.9%
2000	1,699		2.1%
2010	1,261		−25.8%
2020	926		−26.6%
U.S. Decennial Census

As of the census of 2000, there were 1,699 people, 626 households, and 458 families residing in the CDP. The population density was 20.7 people per square mile (8.0/km^{2}). There were 818 housing units at an average density of 9.9 per square mile (3.8/km^{2}). The racial makeup of the CDP was 97.53% White, 0.47% African American, 0.29% Native American, 0.71% Asian, 0.53% from other races, and 0.47% from two or more races. Hispanic or Latino of any race were 1.12% of the population.

There were 626 households, out of which 34.2% had children under the age of 18 living with them, 62.3% were married couples living together, 8.3% had a female householder with no husband present, and 26.8% were non-families. 22.4% of all households were made up of individuals, and 9.4% had someone living alone who was 65 years of age or older. The average household size was 2.71 and the average family size was 3.21.

In the CDP, the population was spread out, with 26.3% under the age of 18, 9.9% from 18 to 24, 26.4% from 25 to 44, 27.0% from 45 to 64, and 10.5% who were 65 years of age or older. The median age was 37 years. For every 100 females, there were 98.0 males. For every 100 females age 18 and over, there were 96.4 males.

The median income for a household in the CDP was $37,366, and the median income for a family was $51,780. Males had a median income of $36,719 versus $25,192 for females. The per capita income for the CDP was $16,332. About 3.9% of families and 9.2% of the population were below the poverty line, including 11.5% of those under age 18 and 4.4% of those age 65 or over.

The population had dropped to 1,261 at the 2010 census, as many people left after the community was flooded deeply in Hurricane Ike.

== Government ==
The United States Postal Service Hackberry Post Office is located at 904 Main Street in the CDP.

== Education ==
Hackberry is served by the Cameron Parish School Board. Hackberry High School, a primary and secondary school, serves Hackberry.

Cameron Parish Public Library operated the Hackberry Branch at 613 Main Street in the Hackberry. The newly reconstructed library is open for business and welcome to the public.

== Notable people ==
The Grammy Award-nominated Hackberry Ramblers, a Cajun music group, are from the community.
