= Grand Lake, Louisiana =

- Unincorporated community
- Location of Grand Lake in Louisiana
- Coordinates: 30°01′51″N 93°16′20″W
- Country: United States
- State: Louisiana
- Parish: Cameron
- Elevation: 10 ft (3.0 m)
- Time zone: UTC-6 (CST)
  - Summer (DST): UTC-5 (CDT)
- ZIP Code: 70607
- Area code: 337
- GNIS feature ID: 554581

Grand Lake is an unincorporated community in Cameron Parish, Louisiana, United States.

Grand Lake is located along Louisiana Highway 384, south of Lake Charles. It is within a section of the Creole Nature Trail, an All-American Road.

From spring to summer, rice, soybean, rye grass, and sugar cane are commonly found in fields throughout the community. In fall and winter, migrating waterfowl are abundant.

Grand Lake Pontoon Bridge on Hwy 384 (Grand Lake) crosses the Intracoastal Waterway onto the island of Big Lake. The pontoon bridge has no vertical clearance in the closed-to-navigation position. In 2003, the bridge normally opened to pass navigation an average of 1005 times a month. In accordance with 33 CFR 117.5, the bridge opens on signal for the passage of vessels.

== History ==
In June 1896, 45 students were enrolled in school with Martin Hebert, teacher. Considerable cotton was being raised, rice acreage was double that of the previous year, and sweet potatoes were being raised.

From 1905 until 1930 the steamer "Borealis Rex," ran excursions three times a week from Lake Charles to Leesburg (Cameron) for 75 cents, round trip. Grand Lake was a stopping point between the two cities until 1930, when the first road was built through Grand Lake, connecting Calcasieu to Cameron.

== Education ==
Grand Lake School is a primary and secondary public school run by the Cameron Parish School Board with grades Pre-Kindergarten through 12. It is located on Louisiana Highway 384. Sports include Football, Basketball, Baseball, Softball, Rodeo, and Track. The mascot is a Hornet. When Hurricane Rita exited Cameron Parish on September 24, 2005, only three of Cameron Parish's six schools - Grand Lake School, Hackberry High School and Johnson Bayou School were still standing. Students from the totally destroyed coastal schools of South Cameron High School, Cameron Elementary School and South Cameron Elementary School relocated and shared space at the Grand Lake School site.

2009 - 2010 school year; Students: 749 Teachers 62

In 2009 the school joined the advisory committee of National FFA Organization's National Quality Program Standards.

In November 2010, the state of Louisiana approved disaster recovery funds for infrastructure improvement projects with $9,054,344 going to Grand Lake High School for an addition to the Career and Technology Center, installation of two new emergency generators, renovations to the gym and cafeteria, construction of a pre-K playground, the addition of a new track facility and enhancements to the softball field.

By 2011 Grand Lake evolved from a rural setting to a more suburban setting.

In a 2011 - 2012 Gap Statement: African American students' ELA (English and Language Arts) performance consistently decreased from 2008-2011 (88.9% - 72.7% — 60% ~ 36.4%). Students with Disabilities ELA performance decreased from 52.5% to 33.4% Cause for Gap: In 2005 and 2008, Grand Lake High School and the community were adversely impacted by Hurricane Rita and Hurricane Ike respectively. In both years, students missed extended periods of instructional time and many students were living in temporary housing.

The Cameron Parish Library system operates the Grand Lake Branch.

== Community partners ==
Louisiana Cooperative Extension Services 10086 Gulf Hwy. (Grand Lake)

Cameron Parish Council on Aging

The Cameron Parish Council On Aging, 965 Hwy 384, was founded in 1976 and is dedicated in improving the independence and quality of life for the senior citizens of Cameron Parish. Vice President Joe Biden was present for the ribbon cutting ceremony of the Grand Lake Elderly Apartments on January 15, 2010. The Vice President visited Louisiana to view a success story in the hurricane ridden areas. The Grand Lake Elderly Apartments are the only form of housing, in that area, that has been rebuilt since the hurricanes of 2005 and 2008. The apartment unit consists of 30 units dedicated to the elderly who pay rent based on their income.

Children and family services

The Cameron Community Action Agency provides services to those residents at or below the poverty level in Cameron Parish. These residents number approximately 2500–3000. Services provided parish wide including Grand Lake:

- Grand Lake Head Start, a Class A Child Care Facility, serving children 3 to 5 years of age.
- Energy Assistance
- Emergency Energy Assistance
- Needy Family Commodities
- Clothing Bank
- Emergency Food
- Medical Bill Assistance
- Transportation is coordinated with the Council on Aging and provided through the Public Transit Systems
- Adult Education/GED Program

== Infrastructure ==
Water and sewer

There are no incorporated communities in Cameron Parish, therefore there are no municipality-operated facilities.

Fire department

Grand Lake- Sweet Lake Volunteer Fire Department - District 14 Volunteer Firefighters:40 Paid Firefighters:0

Recreation

Grand Lake Recreation District #5; 108 Recreation Lane, has a public swimming pool.

Mosquito control

Cameron Parish Mosquito Abatement District No. 1 began operations in January 1973. Cameron Parish has a total area of about 1,441 square miles of mostly prime mosquito breeding grounds, which is the most area of any parish in the state.

Library

Grand Lake Library was opened on August 18, 2003 at 961 Hwy 384. It was the only Cameron Parish branch library to survive hurricane Rita in 2005 and hurricane Ike in 2008. The library employees worked out of the Grand Lake Library to set up bookmobiles to assist other parts of the parish with library services. In 2012 the library relocated to the site of the old daycare on the Gulf Highway.
