= Creole, Louisiana =

Unincorporated community in Louisiana, U.S.

- Unincorporated community
- Location within the state of Louisiana
- Coordinates: 29°47′46″N 93°06′41″W
- Country: United States
- State: Louisiana
- Parish: Cameron
- Post office established: March 1890
- Named for: Louisiana Creole people
- ZIP Code: 70632

Creole is an unincorporated community in Cameron Parish, Louisiana, United States. The ZIP Code for Creole is 70632.

== History ==
A post office was established at Creole in March 1890. The community was probably named for the Louisiana Creole people. The label 'Creole' refers to those born in colonial Louisiana and their descendants. On October 9, 2020, Hurricane Delta made landfall near the community as a Category 2 hurricane with winds of 100 mph (155 km/h) and a pressure of 970 mb (28.64 inHg).

== Education ==
Cameron Parish School Board is the school district for all of the parish.
