= Hurricane Delta =

Category 4 Atlantic hurricane in 2020

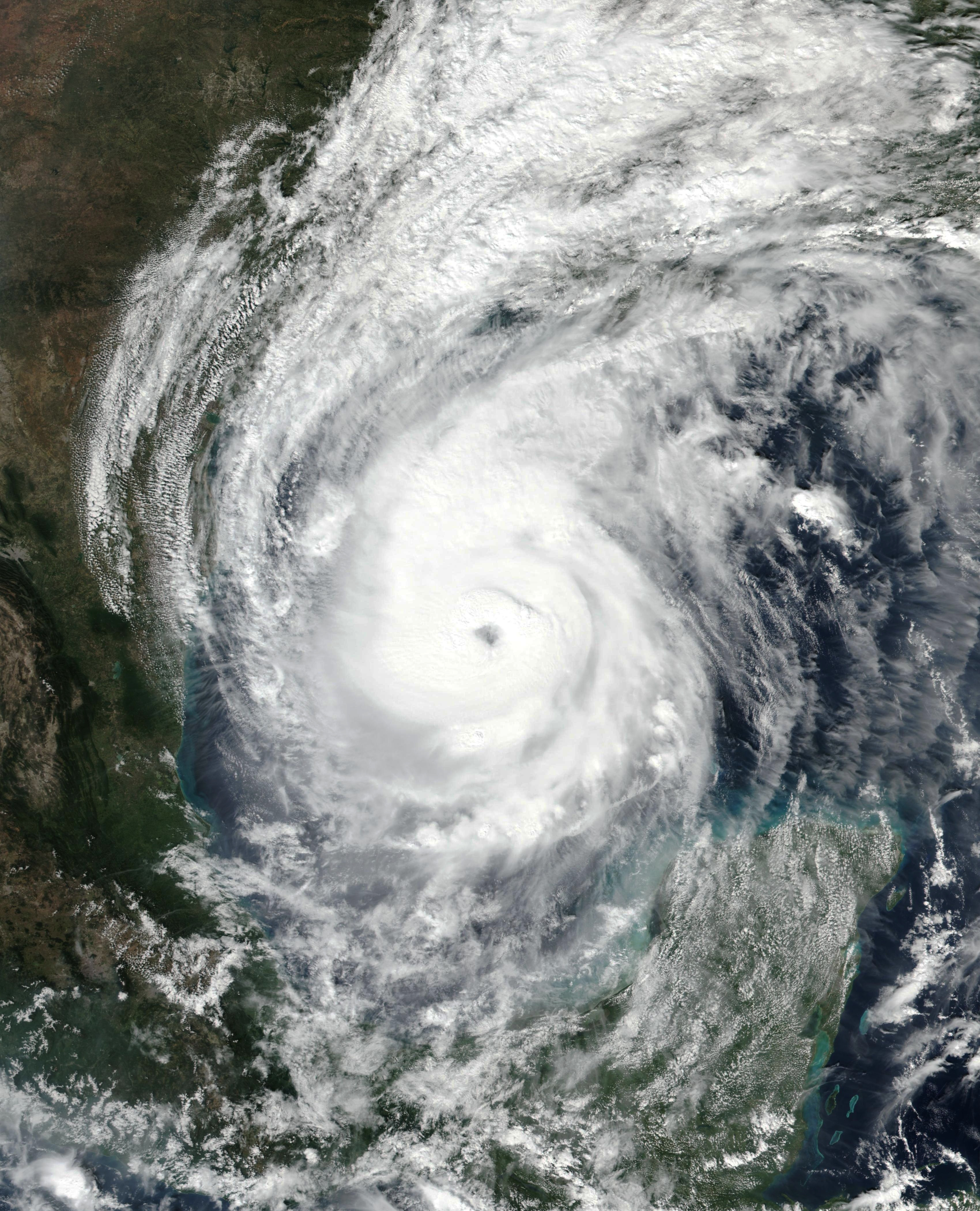
- Delta nearing its secondary peak intensity as a Category 3 hurricane east of Texas on October 8

Meteorological history
- Formed: October 4, 2020
- Extratropical: October 10, 2020
- Dissipated: October 12, 2020

Category 4 major hurricane
- 1-minute sustained (SSHWS/NWS)
- Highest winds: 140 mph (220 km/h)
- Lowest pressure: 953 mbar (hPa); 28.14 inHg

Overall effects
- Fatalities: 6 (2 direct, 4 indirect)
- Damage: $3.09 billion (2020 USD)
- Areas affected: Jamaica, Nicaragua, Cayman Islands, Yucatán Peninsula, Gulf Coast of the United States, Eastern United States
- IBTrACS /
- Part of the 2020 Atlantic hurricane season

Hurricane Delta was a destructive tropical cyclone that became the record-tying fourth named storm of 2020 to make landfall in Louisiana, as well as the record-breaking tenth named storm to strike the United States in that year. The twenty-sixth tropical cyclone, twenty-fifth named storm, tenth hurricane, and third major hurricane of the record-breaking 2020 Atlantic hurricane season, Delta formed from a tropical wave which was first monitored by the National Hurricane Center (NHC) on October 1. Moving westward, the tropical wave began to quickly organize. A well-defined center of circulation formed with sufficiently organized deep convection on October 4, and was designated as Tropical Depression Twenty-six and soon thereafter, Tropical Storm Delta. Extremely rapid intensification ensued throughout October 5 into October 6, with Delta becoming a Category 4 hurricane within 28 hours of attaining tropical storm status. The rate of intensification was the fastest in the Atlantic basin since Hurricane Wilma in 2005. After peaking in intensity however, an unexpected increase in wind shear and dry air quickly weakened the small storm before it made landfall in Puerto Morelos, Mexico as a Category 2 hurricane with 105 mph (169 km/h) winds. It weakened some more over land before emerging into the Gulf of Mexico, where it was downgraded to a Category 1 hurricane. After that, it began to restrengthen, regaining Category 3 status late on October 8. It then turned northward and reached a secondary peak intensity of 953 mbar (28.14 inHg) and winds of 120 mph early on October 9. Delta then began to turn more north-northeastward into an area of cooler waters, higher wind shear, and dry air, causing it to weaken back to Category 2 status. Delta then made landfall at 23:00 UTC near Creole, Louisiana with winds of 100 mph (160 km/h) and a pressure of 970 mbar (29 inHg). The storm began to weaken more rapidly after landfall, becoming post-tropical just 22 hours later.

Widespread tropical cyclone watches and warnings were issued throughout the Western Caribbean and the Mexican states of Yucatán and Quintana Roo, which had just been hit by Hurricane Gamma, in preparation for the storm. As Delta moved out of the Gulf of Mexico, more watches were issued for the U.S. Gulf Coast, an area that had already seen multiple strong hurricanes such as Laura and Sally earlier in the season. States of emergency were also declared in the U.S. states of Louisiana, Mississippi, and Alabama and several coastal and low-lying areas were ordered to evacuate. In Mexico, trees and power lines were blown down, and roofs were ripped off homes and other buildings. Louisiana and Southeast Texas were again affected by heavy rain, high winds, and storm surge, and 14 weak tornadoes were confirmed in Mississippi, Alabama, Georgia and the Carolinas. Total insured losses resulting from the storm amounted to $3.09 billion, with $2.9 billion in the US and US$186 million in Mexico.

== Meteorological history ==
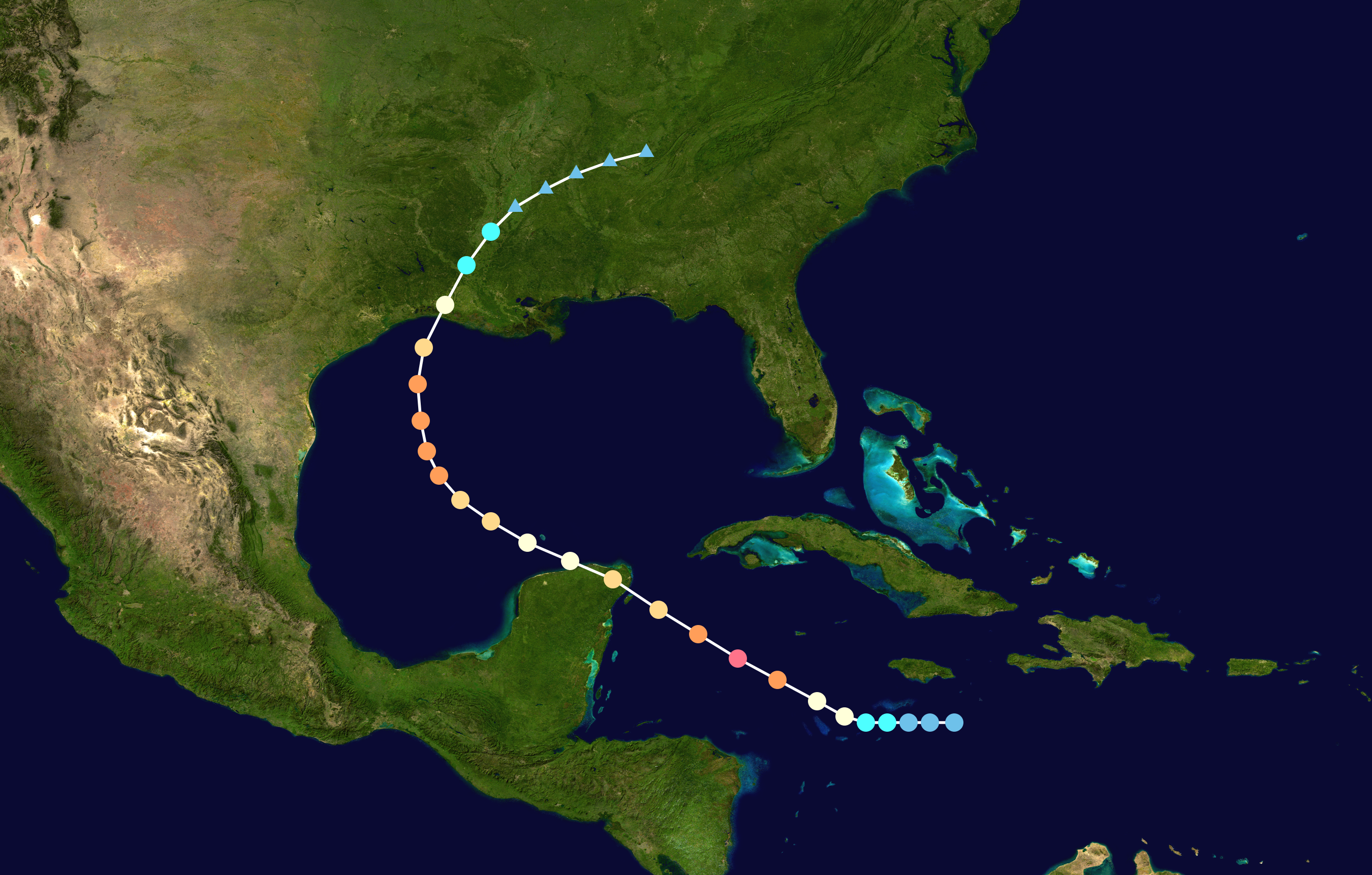
Map plotting the storm's track and intensity, according to the Saffir–Simpson scale Map key Saffir–Simpson scale Tropical depression (≤38 mph, ≤62 km/h) Tropical storm (39–73 mph, 63–118 km/h) Category 1 (74–95 mph, 119–153 km/h) Category 2 (96–110 mph, 154–177 km/h) Category 3 (111–129 mph, 178–208 km/h) Category 4 (130–156 mph, 209–251 km/h) Category 5 (≥157 mph, ≥252 km/h) Unknown Storm type Tropical cyclone Subtropical cyclone Extratropical cyclone, remnant low, tropical disturbance, or monsoon depression

Hurricane Delta originated from a tropical wave that departed off the west coast of Africa on September 26, 2020. It lacked deep atmospheric convection as it trekked across the tropical eastern Atlantic. With time, showers and thunderstorms began to increase within the wave, although no distinct circulation center was detected. Early on October 1, the National Hurricane Center (NHC) began to monitor the tropical wave moving into the Eastern Caribbean for potential tropical cyclogenesis. As the system moved across the Lesser Antilles, thunderstorm activity fluctuated, inhibited from development by moderate vertical wind shear and dry air intrusion. At 18:00 UTC on October 4, analysis of satellite imagery and scatterometer data found a well-defined circulation center sustaining sufficiently-organized deep convection, marking the formation of Tropical Depression Twenty-Six about 100 mi (170 km) south of Kingston, Jamaica. Convection continued to increase after formation, but was initially confined to the southern portion of the circulation due to northerly wind shear. Once the shear lessened on October 5, convection became more symmetric around the center, and the system strengthened to become Tropical Storm Delta by 12:00 UTC that day about 150 mi (240 km) south-southwest of Montego Bay, Jamaica.

While accelerating west-northwestward over the Western Caribbean along a building subtropical ridge to its north and northeast, Delta commenced a phase of rapid intensification over ideal environmental conditions encompassing warm seas, low wind shear, and high levels of moisture aloft, becoming a Category 1 hurricane 12 hours after being named. As it finally began to turn northwestward early on October 6, Delta reached Category 2 status just nine hours later at 09:00 UTC, before becoming a Category 3 major hurricane three hours later at 12:00 UTC. Delta's intensification was described as the fastest in a 24-hour period since Hurricane Wilma of 2005. The storm was characterized as a very symmetric and compact system as a pinhole eye began to form. At 15:20 UTC, an NOAA hurricane Hunter aircraft indicated that the storm's 1-minute sustained wind speed was at 130 mph (210 km/h), making Delta a Category 4 hurricane. Delta intensified from a tropical depression to Category 4 hurricane in just over 36 hours, breaking the record of 42 hours that Hurricane Keith set in 2000. Measured at 4 nautical miles (4.6 mi; 7.4 km) in width, the eye was slightly larger than the smallest eye ever observed in Hurricane Wilma in 2005.

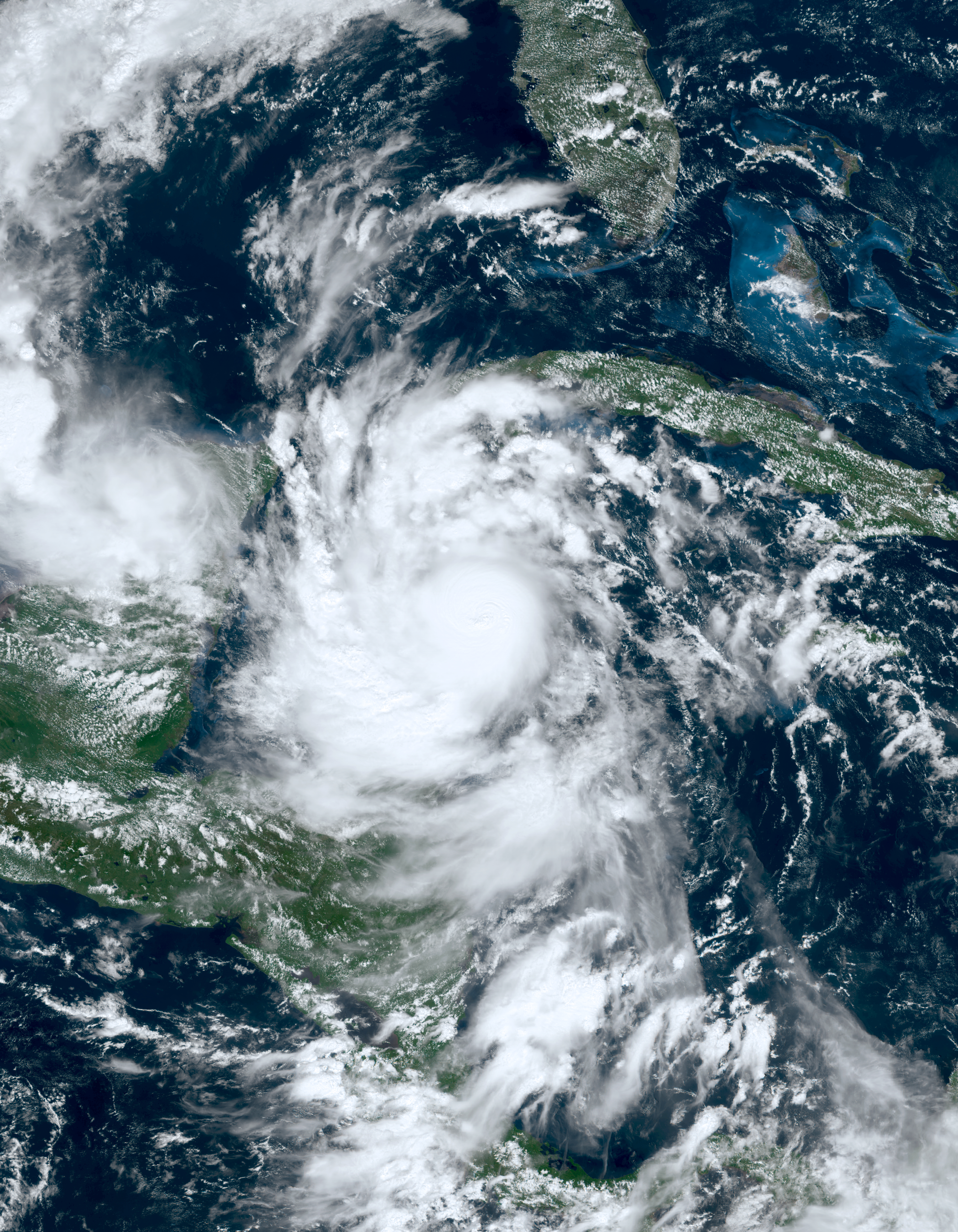
Delta shortly before its initial peak intensity as a Category 4 hurricane on October 6

Delta attained its peak intensity by 18:00 UTC with maximum sustained winds of 140 mph (220 km/h) and a barometric pressure of 953 mbar (28.14 inHg). Delta had intensified by 105 mph (165 km/h) in over 36 hours, which only four other tropical cyclones had been able to achieve since the satellite era. At this time, Delta exhibited its pinhole eye surrounded by very intense deep convection. Its pressure was unusually high for a storm this strong, which indicated that Delta's circulation did not extend as far into the upper troposphere as would be expected for a storm of its intensity. Additionally, the storm's eye was barely visible on visible satellite imagery, although it was seen on microwave images. Delta did not keep this intensity for very long as an increase in mid-level wind shear and dry air entrainment significantly disrupted Delta's small core, and the storm abruptly weakened with its banding features becoming less defined and its eye completely disappearing. The storm accelerated northwestward and at around 05:45 UTC on October 7, made landfall at Puerto Morelos, Quintana Roo, Mexico, as a high-end Category 2 storm with winds of 110 mph (180 km/h). It subsequently weakened some more as it moved over the Yucatán Peninsula and into the Gulf of Mexico as a Category 1 hurricane. The storm remained well-organized throughout its passage over the peninsula, situating over conducive atmospheric and oceanic conditions; as such, Delta again intensified.

Satellite imagery revealed a central dense overcast as the system gradually intensifies into a Category 2 hurricane at 06:00 UTC of October 8. Delta steadily became more organized, with an eye occasionally becoming evident on satellite imagery and a lowering minimum central pressure as it turned northward ahead of an approaching trough to its northwest. Delta regained Category 3 status by 18:00 UTC about 230 mi (370 km) south of the Texas–Louisiana border. Early on October 9, Delta attained its secondary peak intensity with sustained winds of 120 mph (195 km/h) and a central pressure of 953 mbar (28.14 inHg). The storm held the intensity overnight until an increase of southwesterly wind shear and a decrease in ocean heat weakened it over the northern Gulf of Mexico into a Category 2 hurricane at 18:00 UTC. As an asymmetrical storm, Delta made another landfall near Creole, Louisiana at 23:00 UTC with winds of 100 mph (155 km/h). After that, Delta began to weaken more rapidly, dropping to Category 1 status an hour after landfall at 00:00 UTC on October 10 and a tropical storm six hours later. It accelerated northeastward and transitioned into an extratropical cyclone over Western Mississippi by 18:00 UTC. The system continued to weaken and its circulation broadened through the day on October 11, and by 00:00 on October 12, it opened into a trough of low pressure over the southeastern United States.

== Preparations ==
=== Cayman Islands and Cuba ===
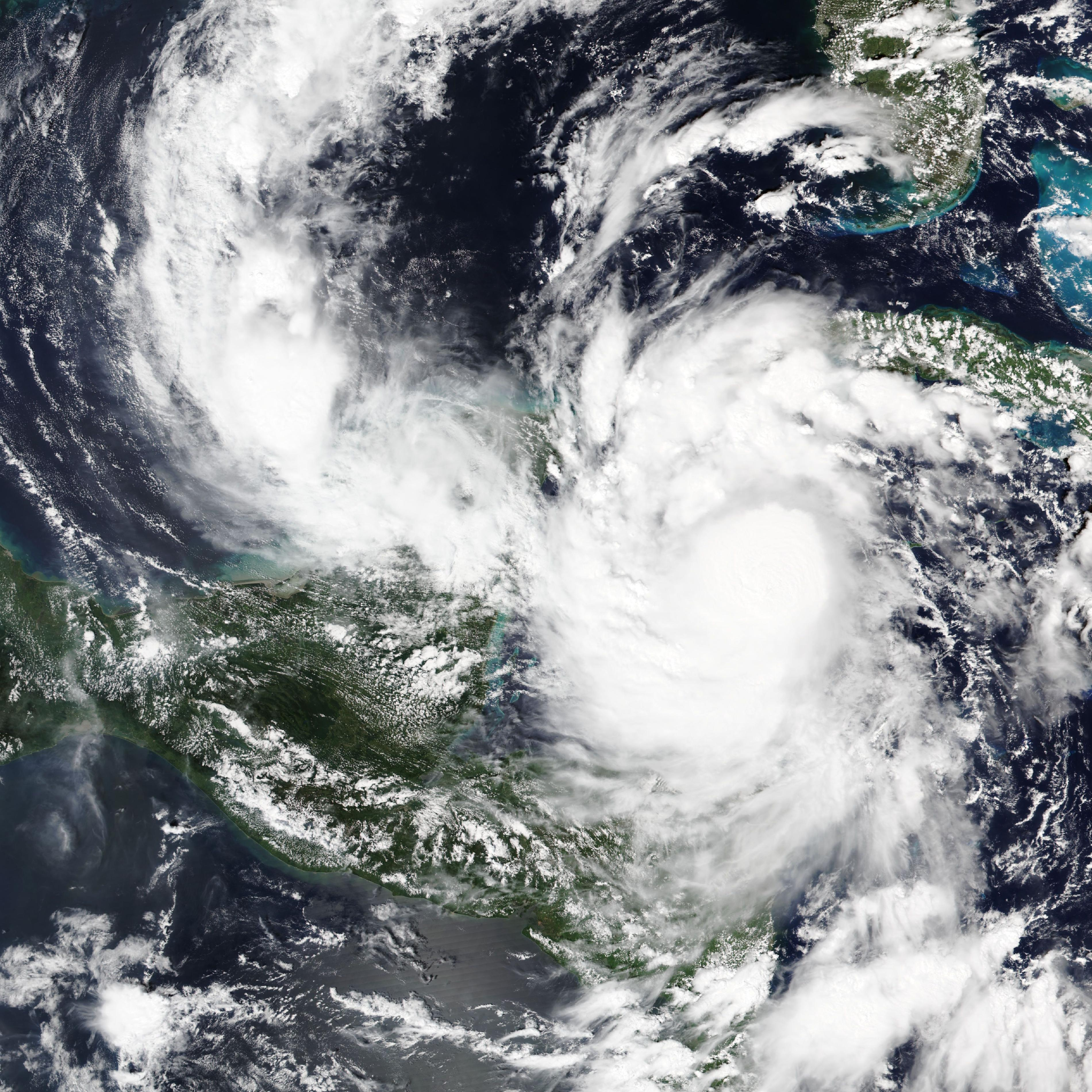
The remnants of Hurricane Gamma (left) and Hurricane Delta (right) on October 6.

Tropical storm warnings were issued for the islands of Grand Cayman and Cayman Brac when advisories were first initiated on Potential Tropical Cyclone Twenty-Six. In the Cayman Islands, all public schools were closed from October 5 to October 6 as the rainbands were forecast to bring high winds and flooding to the islands. All government offices were on the afternoon of October 5 and remained closed for the entire day on October 6. Cayman Airways reported cancellation of its flights. The Red Cross shelter on Huldah Avenue was on stand-by in the event of flooding. The government set up facilities for shelter with proper protocol for COVID-19 for people with the virus isolating at home. All Government events on October 5–6 were cancelled, including Older Person's Month activities.

When the initial advisory was issued for Potential Tropical Cyclone Twenty-Six, a hurricane watch was issued for the provinces Pinar del Río, Artemisa and the Isle of Youth while a tropical storm watch was issued for La Habana. Three hours after the storm was upgraded to Tropical Storm Delta, the watch for Pinar del Río was upgraded to a hurricane warning while a Tropical Storm Warning was issued for the Isle of Youth. This, however, was downgraded to a tropical storm warning when Hurricane Delta jogged south and put less of the area in harm's way.

=== Mexico ===
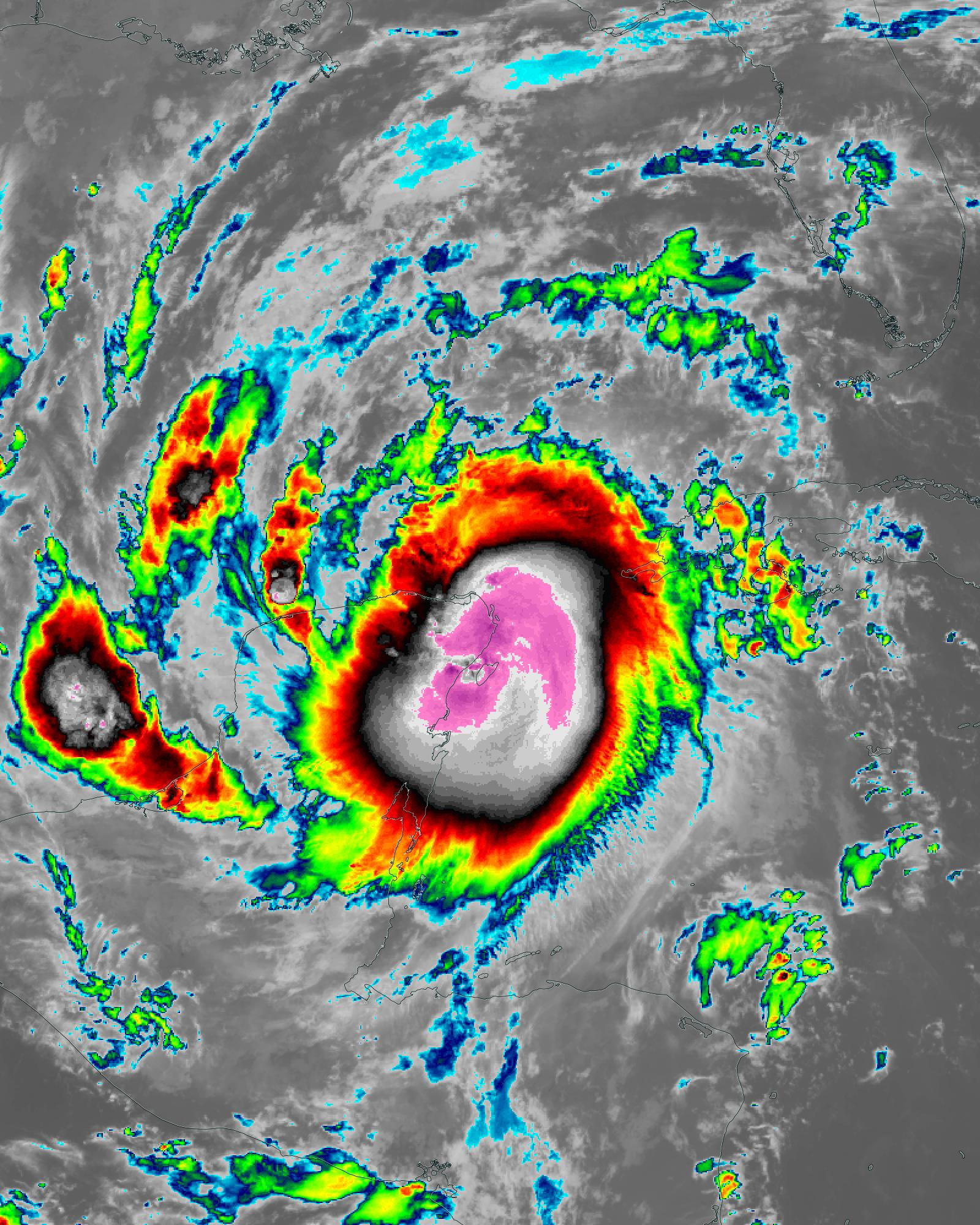
Enhanced Infrared satellite image of Delta making landfall in Quintana Roo on October 7

As Delta was nearing landfall in Quintana Roo, many communities were still being impacted by the remnants of Hurricane Gamma, which caused six deaths and left thousands of people homeless. Just minutes after tropical storm watches and warnings for Gamma were dropped from the Yucatán Peninsula, a hurricane warning was issued for the northeastern part of the peninsula after Delta jogged south, putting more of the region in the line of potential impact. More tropical storm warnings were put up shortly thereafter. President Andrés Manuel López Obrador reported on October 6 that Admiral José Rafael Ojeda Durán, Secretary of the Navy, and Laura Velázquez, National Coordinator of Civil Protection, were traveling to Quintana Roo to help with preparations for Hurricane Delta. The federal government also had been communicating with Governor of Quintana Roo Carlos Joaquín González since October 5. In addition, the president announced on October 6 the activation of the DN-III-E emergency plan and the mobilization of 5,000 soldiers of the Armed Forces to the southeast of the country, to help with the evacuation of sheltering of people still recovering from Gamma. More than 4,000 people, including tourists and residents, were evacuated from Holbox due to the threat of life-threatening impacts from Hurricane Delta. Seven of the 59 shelters that exist in the municipality of Lázaro Cárdenas with a capacity of 1,800 people have been enabled. A total of 41,000 tourists were evacuated from the state of Quintana Roo, and a red alert was declared for the state. Many hotels and archaeological sites in the Yucatán Peninsula were closed, including the busy historical sites of Chichen Itzá and Tulum. In Cancún, 160 shelters were opened for tourists and residents. In addition, around 400 tourists were sheltering at the Cancún Convention Center, and some 300 guests and 200 staff from the Fiesta Americana Condesa hotel were taking shelter, at the Technological Institute of Cancún campus. One lower division soccer match was postponed on October 8.

=== United States ===
==== Alabama ====
Tourists and visitors were ordered to leave Alabama's barrier islands as of October 6 while a state of emergency was also declared for the state.

==== Mississippi ====
Governor of Mississippi Tate Reeves declared a state of emergency on October 7 ahead of the storm. The Mississippi Emergency Management Agency distributed 160,000 sandbags to Hancock, Harrison, and Jackson Counties. On October 8, President Donald Trump approved Governor Reeves' request for a federal emergency declaration in anticipation of Hurricane Delta. On October 8, the Gulfport Municipal Marina advised vessels to evacuate by 1:00 p.m. CDT (18:00 UTC).

==== Louisiana ====
The area that Delta threatened was the same area affected by the stronger Hurricane Laura a little over one month earlier. Many residents were still traumatized due to significant damage from Hurricane Laura still evident in coastal areas. Around 5,600 residents were still located in hotels six weeks after Laura struck because their homes were destroyed by the hurricane. Additionally, 6,000 homes still had tarps on them.

On October 6, Governor of Louisiana, John Bel Edwards, declared a state of emergency ahead of Hurricane Delta. The Houston SPCA evacuated 15 cats from a shelter in Louisiana to their shelter in Houston. A group of firefighters from Tulsa, Oklahoma traveled to Monroe to set-up a shelter for evacuees and help with swift water rescues along the coast. Waitr offered free grocery delivery in Lafayette for those unable or choosing not to go out in public to prepare for the storm. On October 7, Louisiana Governor John Bel Edwards conferred with President of the United States Donald Trump, who agreed to sign a disaster declaration for the entire state ahead of the storm.

In college football, a matchup between Louisiana-Lafayette and Coastal Carolina was postponed to October 14. The matchup between LSU and Missouri was relocated to Faurot Field in Columbia, Missouri as well. More than 1,000 Louisiana National Guardsmen, 7,500 utility workers, and dozens of high water rescue vehicles, boats, and aircraft were put on standby. Another 8,000 utility workers were waiting outside the state.

=== Elsewhere ===
On October 5, the oil drilling companies of BP and BHP began evacuating non-essential personnel from their offshore platforms in the Gulf of Mexico.

== Impact ==
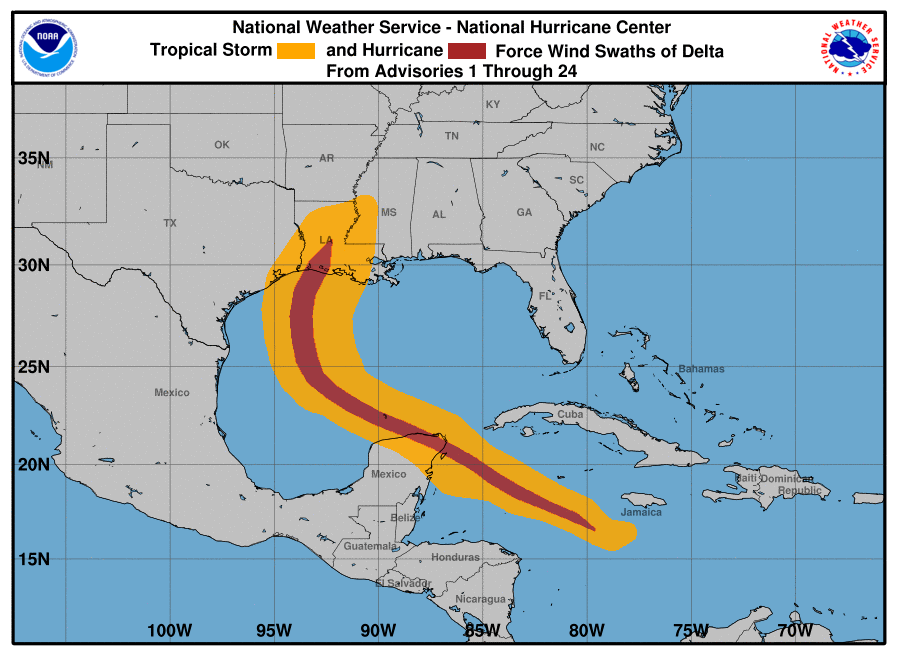
The wind swath of Hurricane Delta with hurricane-force winds in red and tropical-storm force winds in orange.

=== Mexico ===
The storm brought power outages and uprooted trees in Cancún and Cozumel. A peak wind gust of 110 mph (175 km/h) was reported in Puerto Morelos, Quintana Roo, where the hurricane made landfall. Another wind gust of 106 mph (171 km/h) was reported in nearby Cancún. Civil defense official Luís Alberto Vázquez said there were no immediate reports of deaths or injuries, but reported that Delta downed about 95 trees and caused more than 266,000 customers to lose power in parts of the Yucatán Peninsula. Many hotels and resorts lost electricity and air conditioning. Street flooding was reported in Cozumel. Many piers were destroyed due to storm surge, and several buildings near the coast were also destroyed. Roughly 2,500 hectares of crops were damaged by the storm. Before the arrival of the hurricane, a 65-year-old man in Tizimin, Yucatán, lost his life after falling from the second floor of his house while preparing for the storm. Following the storm a woman lost her life in Mérida after touching a downed pole and thus being electrocuted. Damage in Cancún stood at MX$4 billion (US$186 million).

=== United States ===
25,000 customers in Texas and Louisiana lost power before Delta made landfall. That number soon rose to 740,000 as Delta pulled inland.

==== Louisiana ====
Radar image of Delta making landfall in Louisiana on October 9.

Street flooding was reported in Baton Rouge on October 8. The Baton Rouge Metropolitan Airport reported 8 inches (200 mm) of rain, which prompted a flash flood warning issued by the National Weather Service. At least 25 motorists were stuck in high water in Baton Rouge. The next day, Lake Charles Regional Airport reported a wind gust of 60 mph (97 km/h) as the storm approached at around 18:00 UTC, while another station in Lake Charles recorded a peak gust of 88 mph (142 km/h). In the following hours, a WeatherFlow observing site near Cameron reported a wind gust of 51 mph (82 km/h) and a National Ocean Service station at Calcasieu Pass reported sustained winds of 53 mph (85 km/h), a wind gust of 64 mph (103 km/h), and a pressure of 983.8 mbar (29.05 inHg). Around the time of landfall, a Florida Coastal Monitoring Tower near Lake Arthur reported a sustained wind of 77 mph (124 km/h) and a gust to 96 mph (154 km/h) while a NOAA National Weather Service water level gauge at Freshwater Canal Locks reported 8 feet (2.4 m) of storm surge. Shortly after that, the Lake Charles Regional Airport reported sustained winds of 64 mph (103 km/h) with gusts to 95 mph (153 km/h).

Delta made landfall just 12 miles (19 km) east of where Hurricane Laura did six weeks earlier. Across the state, tarps and debris from Laura were blown away. Many areas in hard-hit Lake Charles were damaged again and some homes were flooded in Moss Bluff. Additional damage occurred in Jennings and widespread power outages were reported. In Calcasieu Parish, several vehicles were overturned on I-10. Due to multiple car accidents on the Calcasieu River Bridge, both directions of the bridge, carrying I-10 and US 90, were closed to traffic. The Bank Hotel in Lake Arthur had its roof damaged when many of the shingles on top were torn off. In St. Martinville, a generator related fire caused the death of an 86-year-old man. In addition, a 70-year-old woman in Iberia Parish died in a fire likely caused by a natural gas leak following damage from Hurricane Delta.

==== Mississippi ====
Delta uprooted many trees across Mississippi. One tree landed on a news vehicle while its crew was inside in Jackson. No one was seriously injured. A gust of 54 mph was reported in Jackson. In the Jackson metro area, damage was minimal, with power outages, a few uprooted trees, and a traffic signal damaged. In Warren County, emergency management reported 36 downed trees, including one that fell on a home in Vicksburg. In the state, a total of 95,700 customers lost power. Major highways such as US 61, US 84, and US 51 were closed due to uprooted trees and debris. In Natchez, a home was destroyed by a large uprooted tree, and several other homes, apartments, and businesses were damaged. An extremely brief EF0 tornado in McCall Creek also snapped or uprooted trees near a home on October 9.

==== Alabama, Georgia, and the Carolinas ====
Widespread tornado warnings were issued throughout the rest of the Southeast and 13 other tornadoes were confirmed on October 10-11. On October 10 in Georgia, an EF1 tornado damaged a homeless shelter in Covington, injuring two people and displacing 30 others. The next day, an EF1 tornado in Latta, South Carolina, destroyed a storage shed and damaged a billboard, mobile home, home, and trees. Later, another EF1 tornado in Conway, South Carolina snapped and uprooted trees, significantly damaged a home and old barn, and caused minor damage to a storage shed and another home, injuring one person. An EF1 tornado in Nakina, North Carolina damaged the roof and carport of a home as well as an outbuilding.

=== Elsewhere ===
The precursor to Delta brought squally weather in the Lesser Antilles, ABC Islands, Virgin Islands, Puerto Rico, and Hispaniola. Tropical-storm force winds from Delta were first reported in Texas, where a Texas Coastal Ocean Observation Network station at the Galveston Bay North Jetty reported sustained winds of 42 mph (68 km/h) and a wind gust of 49 mph (79 km/h) at around 16:00 UTC on October 9. In the following hours, a wind gust of 55 mph (89 km/h) was reported at the Jack Brooks Regional Airport near Port Arthur, a wind gust of 60 mph (97 km/h) was observed at Nederland, and a Texas Coastal Ocean Observation Network station at Texas Point reported sustained winds of 62 mph (100 km/h) with a gust of 78 mph (126 km/h). In Galveston, about 100 miles (160 km) from where the center made landfall, winds toppled trees, street signs and two homes under construction. Due to sand dunes flattened by earlier storms, storm surge reached beneath raised houses. Large swells and rip currents prompted beach closures as far west as the mouth of the Rio Grande River. Two people drowned in Florida as a result of Hurricane Delta. One drowning occurred in Pensacola where a 49-year-old man was caught in strong rip currents and another drowning occurred in Destin where a 19-year-old tourist drowned and another was rescued after they were caught in a rip current produced by Hurricane Delta. The remnants of Delta also affected parts of the Northeastern United States. In New Jersey, a peak rainfall amount of 3.67 inches (93 mm) was recorded in West Creek, and a top wind gust of 42 miles per hour (68 km/h) was recorded in Sea Girt. The rainfall in New England also helped to ease the drought in the region.

== Aftermath ==
=== Mexico ===
In Cancun, within a week of Delta's passage, electrical and water services were restored throughout the area. The Convoy of Hope handed out relief supplies to families affected by the hurricane.

=== United States ===
==== Louisiana ====
In the immediate aftermath of Delta, Louisiana Governor John Bel Edwards stated that tens of thousands would need help recovering after the storm's destruction. He also surveyed damage in areas hard-hit by the hurricane.

== Records and naming ==
Delta was the earliest 25th tropical or subtropical storm on record in an Atlantic hurricane season, surpassing the old mark of November 15, set by Tropical Storm Gamma in 2005. Delta rapidly intensified from a 35 mph (55 km/h) tropical depression to a 130 mph (210 km/h) Category 4 hurricane in twenty-four hours, the fastest such occurrence on record in the Atlantic Basin. Delta was the record-setting tenth named storm of the year to make landfall in the continental U.S., surpassing the previous record of nine set in 1916. Delta was also the record-tying fourth named storm to hit Louisiana in 2020, tying the record set in 2002; this record was surpassed by Hurricane Zeta later in the month.

The 2020 season was the second (along with 2005) in which an alphabetic list of 21 storm names had been exhausted, necessitating use of the Greek alphabet auxiliary list. In March 2021, the World Meteorological Organization replaced that auxiliary list with a new 21-name supplemental list. As a result, the letter Delta will not be used to name another Atlantic hurricane for the foreseeable future.

== See also ==
- Tropical cyclones in 2020
- List of Category 4 Atlantic hurricanes
- List of Louisiana hurricanes (2000–present)
- List of costliest Atlantic hurricanes
- Hurricane Audrey (1957) – Deadly Category 3 hurricane that made landfall near the Texas–Louisiana state line.
- Hurricane Wilma (2005) – Category 5 hurricane that also explosively intensified, becoming the strongest Atlantic hurricane ever recorded before striking the Yucatán Peninsula as a Category 4 storm.
- Hurricane Gustav (2008) – Category 4 hurricane that devastated the Western Caribbean before impacting Louisiana as a Category 2 storm.
- Hurricane Zeta (2020) – Category 3 hurricane that took a similar track three weeks later.
