= Cameron Parish School Board =

School district in Louisiana, United States

Coordinates: 29.7956°N 93.3195°W

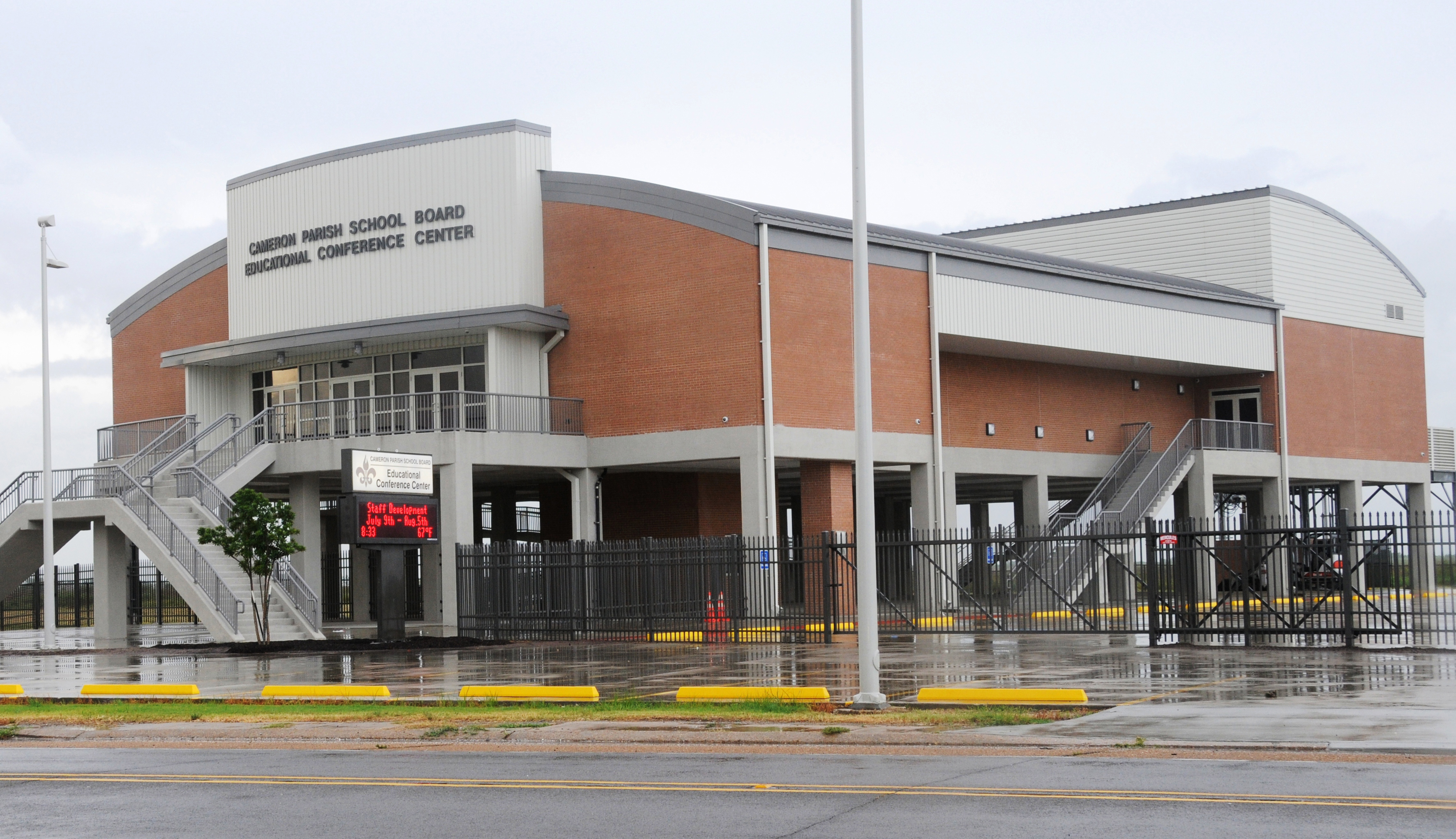
Cameron Parish School Board Educational Conference Center in Cameron

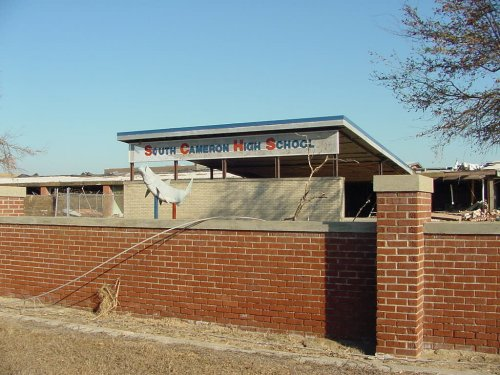
South Cameron High School after Hurricane Rita

Cameron Parish School Board (CPSB) or Cameron Parish School District or Cameron Parish School System (CPSS) is a school district headquartered in unincorporated Cameron Parish, Louisiana, United States. The district's boundaries parallel those of Cameron Parish.

The district's headquarters are in Cameron.

== History ==
In September 2005 Hurricane Rita struck Cameron Parish. Four of the parish's six public schools were destroyed or damaged; students from three other schools (Cameron Elementary, South Cameron Elementary, and South Cameron High) occupied Grand Lake High School while students from Johnson Bayou occupied Hackberry High School's campus.

Circa 2009, the district has its temporary headquarters at 1027 Highway 384 in the Grand Lake area.

== School uniforms ==
Students are required to wear school uniforms.

== Schools ==
- Grand Lake High School (7-12)
- Hackberry High School (PK-12)
- Johnson Bayou High School (PK-12)
  - As a result of the September 2008 Hurricane Ike, 80% of the Johnson Bayou campus received damage. The district was to try to get the Federal Emergency Management Agency (FEMA) to fund a replacement school instead of a repaired campus.
- South Cameron High School (PK-12)
  - Was formerly two separate schools (South Cameron Elementary School and South Cameron High School)
  - Hurricane Ike destroyed South Cameron's temporary buildings.
  - Due to declining enrollment, South Cameron no longer sponsors football.
- Grand Lake Elementary School (PK-6)

== Former schools ==
- Cameron Elementary School (PreK-7)
  - Closed after Hurricane Rita in fall 2005; school consolidated into South Cameron High School by fall 2006.
- Grand Chenier Elementary School
  - Closed in 2001 after enrollment decreased to 60 students.
- South Cameron Elementary School
  - Closed after Hurricane Rita in fall 2005; school consolidated into South Cameron High School by fall 2006.
