= Cameron Parish, Louisiana =

Parish in Louisiana, United States

Cameron Parish
- Parish
- Parish of Cameron; Paroisse de Cameron (French)
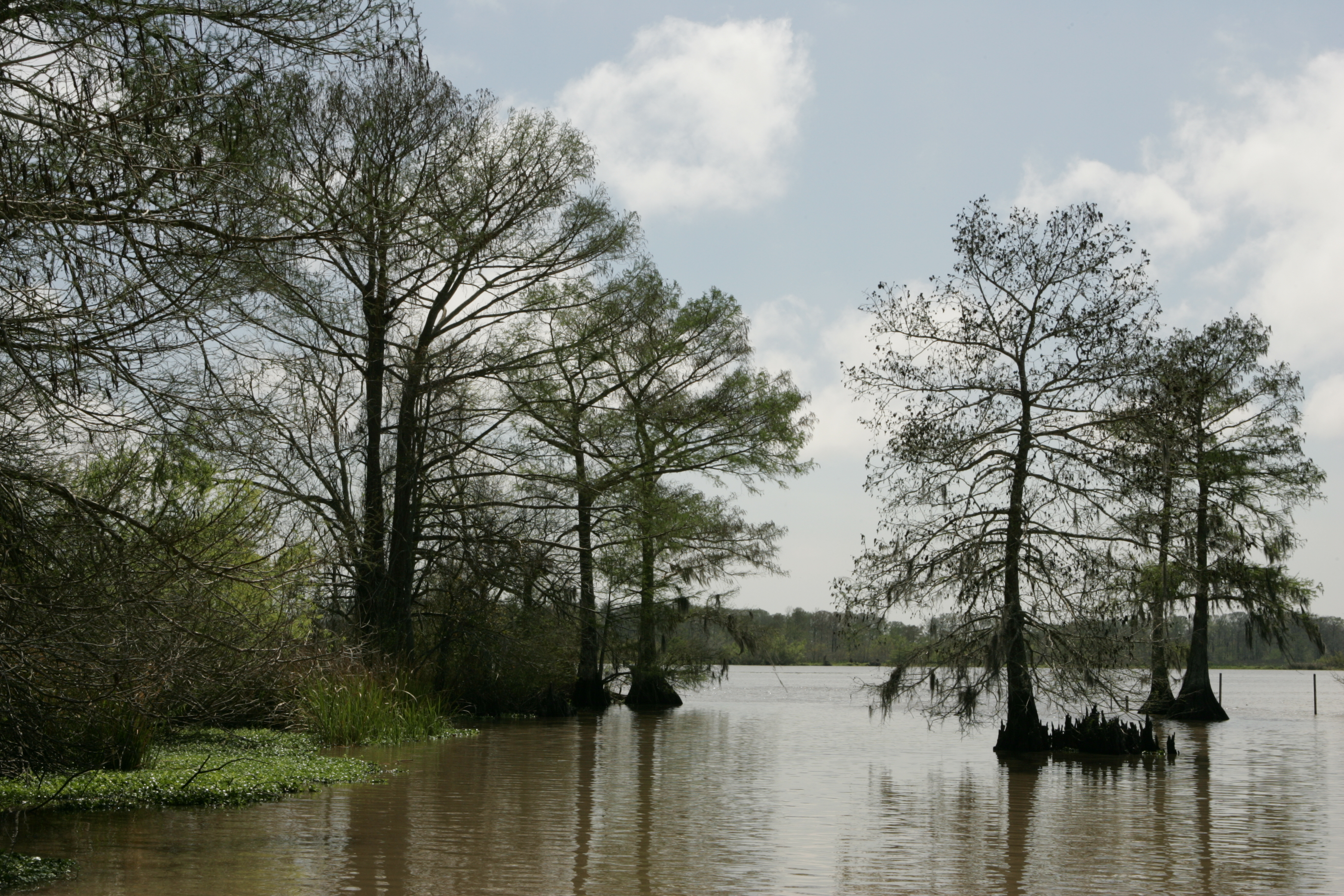
- Bald cypress at Lacassine National Wildlife Refuge

- Location within the U.S. state of Louisiana
- Coordinates: 29°51′N 93°12′W
- Country: United States
- State: Louisiana
- Founded: 1870
- Named for: Simon Cameron
- Seat: Cameron
- Largest community: Grand Lake

Area
  - Total: 1,937 sq mi (5,020 km^{2})
  - Land: 1,285 sq mi (3,330 km^{2})
  - Water: 652 sq mi (1,690 km^{2}) 34%

Population (2020)
  - Total: 5,617
  - Estimate (2025): 4,718 ▼
  - Density: 4.37/sq mi (1.69/km^{2})
- Time zone: UTC−6 (Central)
  - Summer (DST): UTC−5 (CDT)
- Congressional district: 3rd
- Website: cameronpj.org

Cameron Parish (French: Paroisse de Cameron) is a parish in the southwest corner of the U.S. state of Louisiana. As of the 2020 census, the population was 5,617. The parish seat is Cameron. Although it is the largest parish by area in Louisiana, it has the second-smallest population in the state, ahead of only Tensas. Cameron Parish is part of the Lake Charles metropolitan statistical area.

== History ==
This was part of La Louisiane, colonized by the French beginning in the 17th and early 18th centuries. They encountered the Atakapa and Choctaw indigenous peoples, who had occupied this area for thousands of years.

=== 18th century ===
In the late 1700s, after France had ceded New France (Canada) and other holdings east of the Mississippi River to Great Britain following its defeat in 1763 in the Seven Years' War, a number of French-speaking refugee families from Acadia settled in this part of coastal Louisiana. Some had fought against the British with Indian allies during the war in Acadia. Among them were Joseph "Beausoleil" Broussard, his brothers Alexander and Pierre, and their wives and families, who first went to Saint-Domingue (now Haiti) before settling in Louisiana. The British expelled many Acadians for their resistance, particularly their refusal to make loyalty oaths to Great Britain. Numerous other French-speaking families settled here and their descendants populate the smaller towns.

In the 18th century, France ceded its holdings in Louisiana and other areas west of the Mississippi River to Spain, and the Spanish colonial government made grants of land to the Acadians. France took control of this territory again at the turn of the nineteenth century for a short period under Napoleon Bonaparte.

=== 19th century ===
In 1803, Napoleon sold all the French territory west of the Mississippi River to the United States in the Louisiana Purchase. The US was particularly intent on getting control of New Orleans, an important port for its large agricultural interests in what is now the Midwest. Early Anglo-American settlers after the Louisiana Purchase included John M. Smith, Millege McCall, John William Sweeney, George W. Wakefield, William Doxey, James Hale, James Root, and John M. Miller.

In 1807, this territory became part of Calcasieu Parish, established by the new Louisiana Territory legislature. The western part of this coastal area was included in what was called No Man's Land, a disputed area of control between Spain and the US after the Purchase. In the 1806 Neutral Ground agreement, both parties agreed to leave this free of military occupation or civil law enforcement. The area between the Calcasieu River (at the time known to the Spanish as the Arroyo Hondo) on the east and the Sabine River on the west became a hotbed of outlaws, pirates including Jean Lafitte, and other nefarious characters for many years. It was finally acquired by the United States in 1819 under the Adams-Onis Treaty with Spain. (In 1870 these two rivers were designated as the eastern and western boundaries, respectively, of the new Cameron Parish, taken from the southern part of Calcasieu Parish.)

During the American Civil War, loyalties in this area and in the greater coastal area were divided between Unionists and Confederates. Bands of local "Jayhawkers," also known as bushwhackers, were active in the area. There were numerous Unionists near Sabine Lake and Leesburg (now Cameron). Others were located near the mouth of the Calcasieu and near Grand Chenier, then in Vermilion Parish. The Union Navy had forces at Sabine Lake.

The Mermentau Jayhawkers were made up of a band of "200 mounted draft dodgers, bushwhackers, cattle thieves, runaway slaves, and Confederate deserters from Texas and Louisiana." They regularly raided federal supply lines and plundered from the local people, earning the enmity of both Union and Confederate regulars. If caught by Confederate forces, Jayhawker deserters were quickly court-martialed and executed. Local forces also organized as Regulators in an effort to protect women and children of local families, and repulse the Jayhawkers. After the end of the war, some of the vigilante Regulators turned to suppressing blacks and resisting Reconstruction.

Cameron Parish was organized in 1870 during the Reconstruction era and was made up of portions of Calcasieu and Vermilion parishes. It was one of several new parishes organized by the Republican-dominated legislature to create new centers of Republican political strength. Cameron Parish is named for Republican Simon Cameron, a Pennsylvanian who was President Abraham Lincoln's first secretary of war. Today its population is overwhelmingly majority white and Republican in the 21st-century realignment.

This is among the largest civil parishes in Louisiana, yet the least populated, owing to the high proportion of land area made up of marsh and wetlands. Cameron Parish comprises a large portion of the Louisiana Chenier Plain; it is home to numerous cheniers, and elevated fertile ridges that occur in certain coastal regions, particularly in Louisiana. These were developed for cotton plantations both before and after the Civil War; settlers also raised stock.

=== 20th century ===
In 1937, the Pure Oil Company discovered the first Louisiana offshore oil field, the Creole Field, 1.2 miles (1.9 km) from the shore of Cameron Parish, from a platform built on timber pilings in 10-to-15-foot-deep (3.0 to 4.6 m) water.

Some of southwest Louisiana was developed for industrial processing and export of oil products. In some areas, wetlands were drained and bayous dredged for navigation. This has been found to increase erosion of the wetlands and loss to area soils, with loss of coastline. Small farmers and hunters continued to make subsistence living in some rural areas.

From the mid-20th century to the early 21st century, the parish was severely damaged four times and its history was marked by hurricanes Audrey, Rita, Ike, and Laura.

It was devastated by Hurricane Audrey on June 27, 1957, which caused more than 390 deaths. Authors Nola Mae Ross and Susan McFillen Goodson chronicled the stories of many survivors in their book Hurricane Audrey (1997). National press coverage at the time recounted tales of tragedy and heroism. The American Medical Association honored a local Cameron physician, Cecil Clark, as the 'General Practitioner of the Year' in recognition of his dedicated service despite the great personal loss. Hurricane Audrey was a defining event for Cameron Parish for nearly 50 years, with local history being divided into "before" and "after" the storm.

=== 21st century ===
On September 24, 2005, much of the parish was destroyed by Hurricane Rita. The movie Little Chenier was filmed in Southwest Louisiana just prior to Hurricane Rita. It contains some of the only film images of the area before it was destroyed.

In 2008, three years after Rita, Hurricane Ike came ashore at High Island, TX with a 22-foot (6.7 m) storm surge, which was far worse than Rita's 10-foot (3.0 m) surge. Nearly all of the coastline in that area was flooded heavily, with surge and floodwaters reaching 60 miles inland, as far north as Lake Charles. In Cameron Parish the communities of Cameron, Holly Beach, Hackberry, Creole, and Grand Chenier were essentially destroyed. From 2000 to 2010, the population in the parish dropped by nearly one-third as a result of the two hurricanes in 2005 and 2008.

In 2020, Hurricane Laura made landfall near Cameron, boasting over 150-mile-per-hour (240 km/h) winds and 9-foot (2.7 m) storm surge early on August 27, with the water reaching northwards towards Lake Charles. Hurricane Delta made landfall in Creole six weeks later as a Category 2 hurricane with 100-mile-per-hour (160 km/h) winds on October 9, 2020.

There are tourist destinations for hunting and fishing.

== Geography ==
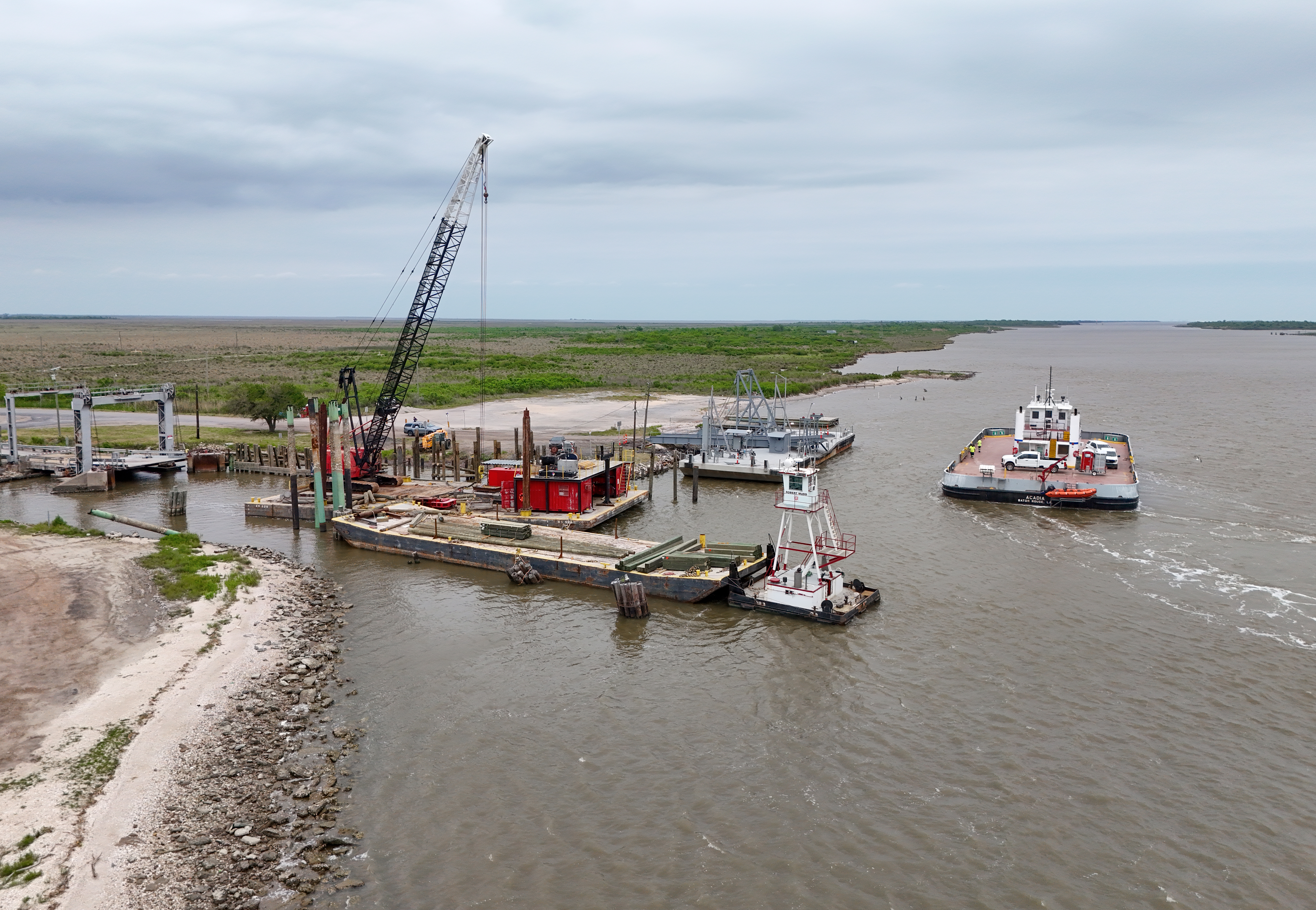
Cameron Ferry West Landing

According to the U.S. Census Bureau, the parish has a total area of 1,937 square miles (5,020 km^{2}), of which 1,285 square miles (3,330 km^{2}) is land and 652 square miles (1,690 km^{2}) (34%) is water. It is the third-largest parish in Louisiana by land area and fourth-largest by total area. Most of the water is associated with marsh on the Gulf of Mexico.

=== Major highways ===
- Louisiana Highway 14
- Louisiana Highway 27
- Louisiana Highway 82
- Louisiana Highway 384
- Louisiana Highway 385
- Louisiana Highway 390
- Louisiana Highway 717
- Louisiana Highway 1141
- Louisiana Highway 1142
- Louisiana Highway 1143
- Louisiana Highway 1144
- Louisiana Highway 3056

=== Adjacent counties and parishes ===
- Calcasieu Parish (northwest)
- Jefferson Davis Parish (northeast)
- Vermilion Parish (east)
- Jefferson County, Texas (southwest)
- Orange County, Texas (west)

=== National protected areas ===
- Cameron Prairie National Wildlife Refuge
- East Cove National Wildlife Refuge
- Lacassine National Wildlife Refuge (part)
- Sabine National Wildlife Refuge

== Communities ==
There are no incorporated communities in Cameron Parish.

=== Census-designated places ===
- Cameron (parish seat)
- Hackberry

=== Unincorporated communities ===
- Constance Beach
- Creole
- Gibbstown
- Grand Chenier
- Grand Lake
- Hacketts Corner
- Holly Beach
- Johnson Bayou
- Lone Pine
- Lowry
- Rutherford Beach

== Demographics ==
Historical population
Census	Pop.	Note	%±
1870	1,591		—
1880	2,416		51.9%
1890	2,828		17.1%
1900	3,952		39.7%
1910	4,288		8.5%
1920	3,952		−7.8%
1930	6,054		53.2%
1940	7,203		19.0%
1950	6,244		−13.3%
1960	6,909		10.7%
1970	8,194		18.6%
1980	9,336		13.9%
1990	9,260		−0.8%
2000	9,991		7.9%
2010	6,839		−31.5%
2020	5,617		−17.9%
2025 (est.)	4,718	▼	−16.0%
U.S. Decennial Census; 1790-1960 1900-1990; 1990-2000 2010-2013

The population of the parish dropped by nearly one-third in the decade from 2000 to 2010; it was marked in 2005 and 2008 by extensive damage from hurricanes Rita and Ike.

Cameron Parish, Louisiana – Racial and ethnic composition Note: the US Census treats Hispanic/Latino as an ethnic category. This table excludes Latinos from the racial categories and assigns them to a separate category. Hispanics/Latinos may be of any race.
Race / Ethnicity (NH = Non-Hispanic)	Pop 1980	Pop 1990	Pop 2000	Pop 2010	Pop 2020	% 1980	% 1990	% 2000	% 2010	% 2020
White alone (NH)	8,619	8,581	9,244	6,465	5,174	92.32%	92.67%	92.52%	94.53%	92.11%
Black or African American alone (NH)	524	498	388	119	71	5.61%	5.38%	3.88%	1.74%	1.26%
Native American or Alaska Native alone (NH)	7	15	37	33	28	0.07%	0.16%	0.37%	0.48%	0.50%
Asian alone (NH)	3	20	44	6	13	0.03%	0.22%	0.44%	0.09%	0.23%
Native Hawaiian or Pacific Islander alone (NH)	x	x	1	0	1	x	x	0.01%	0.00%	0.02%
Other race alone (NH)	6	3	0	1	8	0.06%	0.03%	0.00%	0.01%	0.14%
Mixed race or Multiracial (NH)	x	x	62	61	125	x	x	0.62%	0.89%	2.23%
Hispanic or Latino (any race)	177	143	215	154	197	1.90%	1.54%	2.15%	2.25%	3.51%
Total	9,336	9,260	9,991	6,839	5,617	100.00%	100.00%	100.00%	100.00%	100.00%

According to the 2020 United States census, there were 5,617 people, 2,734 households, and 2,110 families residing in the parish. During the 2010 United States census, there were 6,839 people living in the parish; among them, 95.7% were White, 1.7% Black or African American, 0.5% Native American, 0.1% Asian, 0.8% of some other race and 1.1% of two or more races. 2.3% were Hispanic or Latino (of any race). 46.5% were of French, French Canadian or Cajun ancestry, 18.7% American, 5.8% English and 5.0% Irish ancestry. By 2020, its racial makeup was 92.11% non-Hispanic white, 1.26% Black or African American, 0.5% Native American, 0.23% Asian, 0.02% Pacific Islander, 2.37% other or mixed, and 3.51% Hispanic or Latino of any race.

== Education ==
Cameron Parish School Board operates local public schools within all of Cameron Parish.

Cameron Parish is in the service area of Sowela Technical Community College.

Cameron Parish Public Library is a public library system in Cameron Parish. All of the libraries are located in unincorporated areas.

The main Cameron Parish Library is at 512 Marshall Street. It was formerly at 469 Marshall Street in the Cameron CDP.

The system operates six

- Grand Chenier Branch at 2863 Grand Chenier Highway in the Grand Chenier area
- Grand Lake Branch at 10200 Gulf Hwy in the Grand Lake area
- Hackberry Branch at 613 Main Street in the Hackberry CDP
- Johnson Bayou Branch at 4586 Gulf Beach Highway in the Johnson Bayou area
- Lowry Branch at 454 Lowry Highway in the Lowry area

== Politics ==
Cameron Parish, once solidly Democratic, has trended sharply Republican in recent years. Like other Acadian parishes with large Cajun populations, Cameron has turned sharply right in the 21st century based on cultural issues and Democrats' discomfort with the oil and gas industry. The Republican nominee has won upwards of 80% of the vote in every presidential election since 2008. With Donald Trump receiving almost 91% of the vote in 2020 in Cameron, as well as over 92% of the vote in 2024, it was the ‘reddest’ parish in the State in both elections.

United States presidential election results for Cameron Parish, Louisiana
Year	Republican		Democratic		Third party(ies)	
Year	No.	%	No.	%	No.	%
1912	13	9.22%	119	84.40%	9	6.38%
1916	10	5.78%	163	94.22%	0	0.00%
1920	11	7.01%	146	92.99%	0	0.00%
1924	20	5.36%	353	94.64%	0	0.00%
1928	41	9.51%	390	90.49%	0	0.00%
1932	10	1.05%	938	98.95%	0	0.00%
1936	16	1.48%	1,067	98.52%	0	0.00%
1940	48	3.92%	1,175	96.08%	0	0.00%
1944	86	7.74%	1,025	92.26%	0	0.00%
1948	87	7.75%	742	66.07%	294	26.18%
1952	684	40.50%	1,005	59.50%	0	0.00%
1956	547	40.22%	794	58.38%	19	1.40%
1960	322	13.76%	1,944	83.08%	74	3.16%
1964	871	35.59%	1,576	64.41%	0	0.00%
1968	405	15.62%	533	20.56%	1,655	63.83%
1972	1,391	60.90%	739	32.36%	154	6.74%
1976	819	24.54%	2,432	72.86%	87	2.61%
1980	1,449	38.15%	2,221	58.48%	128	3.37%
1984	2,265	57.99%	1,608	41.17%	33	0.84%
1988	1,775	43.61%	2,257	55.45%	38	0.93%
1992	1,329	30.64%	1,985	45.76%	1,024	23.61%
1996	1,365	32.91%	2,103	50.70%	680	16.39%
2000	2,593	61.99%	1,435	34.31%	155	3.71%
2004	3,190	68.75%	1,367	29.46%	83	1.79%
2008	3,089	81.44%	613	16.16%	91	2.40%
2012	3,260	87.07%	408	10.90%	76	2.03%
2016	3,256	88.19%	323	8.75%	113	3.06%
2020	3,671	90.89%	324	8.02%	44	1.09%
2024	3,120	92.80%	219	6.51%	23	0.68%

== Notable people ==
- Gilbert Franklin Hennigan, represented Cameron Parish in the Louisiana State Senate from 1944 to 1956; he resided at the time in DeRidder in Beauregard Parish.
- Doug Kershaw, musician, was born in Cameron Parish on January 24, 1936.
- Conway LeBleu, Lake Charles native, represented Calcasieu and Cameron parishes in the Louisiana House from 1964 to 1988

== See also ==
- National Register of Historic Places listings in Cameron Parish, Louisiana
