= Louisiana Highway 27 =

State highway in Louisiana, United States

Louisiana Highway 27

- Route of LA 27 highlighted in red

Route information
- Maintained by Louisiana DOTD
- Length: 132.424 mi (213.116 km)
- Existed: 1955 renumbering–present
- Tourist routes: National Scenic Byway: Creole Nature Trail

Major junctions
- Southeast end: LA 14 in Holmwood
- LA 82 in Creole; LA 82 in Holly Beach; I-10 in Sulphur; US 90 in Sulphur; LA 12 in DeQuincy
- Northwest end: US 171 / US 190 in DeRidder

Location
- Country: United States
- State: Louisiana
- Parishes: Calcasieu, Cameron, Beauregard

Highway system
- Louisiana State Highway System; Interstate; US; State; Scenic
← LA 26	→ LA 28

Louisiana Highway 27 (LA 27) is a state highway located in southwestern Louisiana. It runs 132.42 miles (213.11 km) in a general north–south direction from LA 14 in Holmwood to the junction of U.S. Highways 171 and 190 in DeRidder.

The route travels in a mirror-image of the letter "J" as it loops through the wetlands surrounding Calcasieu Lake and passes through Cameron, a small community situated on the Gulf of Mexico. It then extends northward through Sulphur en route to its terminus in DeRidder.

LA 27 essentially functions as two north–south roadways connecting the sparsely populated Cameron Parish to the Lake Charles metropolitan area and is signed accordingly. The north–south directional banners are reversed at the Cameron Ferry, a toll ferry the crosses the Calcasieu Ship Channel.

== Route description ==
LA 27 begins at a junction with LA 14 in Holmwood, a point in Calcasieu Parish. It heads due south and, after 11 miles (18 km), provides access to the 9,621-acre (38.93 km^{2}) Cameron Prairie National Wildlife Refuge. Reaching a cross-roads at Creole, LA 27 turns west concurrent with LA 82, the only other major highway through Cameron Parish.

LA 27 and LA 82 parallel the coastline of the Gulf of Mexico into Cameron, the parish seat. Here, the route crosses the deep-water Calcasieu Ship Channel by way of a toll ferry. Continuing westward to Holly Beach, LA 27 turns northward away from LA 82 and meanders along the west side of Calcasieu Lake through Hackberry. Re-entering Calcasieu Parish, LA 27 overlaps LA 108 through unincorporated Carlyss, a residential area near the industrial section south of Sulphur. At a four-way intersection, LA 1256 continues straight ahead across I-10 and into Downtown Sulphur. LA 27 zigzags onto the parallel Beglis Parkway through a neighboring interchange with I-10, passing just east of the center of town.

Continuing northward, LA 27 passes through the small city of DeQuincy and intersects LA 12. LA 27 proceeds north into Beauregard Parish through Oretta and Singer before reaching its final destination of DeRidder. In the center of town, LA 27 terminates at a one-way pair that is shared by US 171 and US 190. From this junction, connections are made to such cities as Lake Charles, Baton Rouge, and Shreveport, as well as Fort Johnson in Leesville.

=== Byway and memorial designations ===
The entirety of LA 27 from Holmwood to Sulphur serves as a major portion of the Creole Nature Trail, a National Scenic Byway and All-American Road.

In 2003, the portion of LA 27 from Sulphur to DeQuincy was designated as the Horace Lynn Jones Memorial Highway by the state legislature.

== History ==
In the original Louisiana Highway system in use between 1921 and 1955, LA 27 served as a portion of State Route 42 and the entirety of State Route 104. Both were designated by the state legislature during the 1920s. In this system, the two highways running northward from Cameron on either side of Calcasieu Lake had different numbers. The westerly route from Cameron through Sulphur to DeRidder was Route 104, while the easterly route through Creole toward Lake Charles was the southern leg of Route 42, a much longer route that was co-signed with US 171 as far as Mansfield.

When the Louisiana Department of Highways renumbered the state highway system in 1955, lengthy concurrencies between U.S. and state routes were eliminated. Route 104 became LA 27, and the independent portion of former Route 42 southeast of Lake Charles was largely included in that designation, connected via a concurrency with LA 82 through Cameron.

Class "A": La 27—From the east bank of Calcasieu Pass at or near Cameron through or near Hackberry, Sulphur and DeQuincy to a junction with La-US 190 at or near DeRidder. Class "B": La 27—From a junction with La 14 at or near Holmwood through or near Creole to the east bank of Calcasieu Pass at or near Cameron. Class "C": La 27—From a junction with La 14 at or near Chalkley through or near Chloe and Iowa to a junction with La 101 at or near Lacasine[sic].

— 1955 legislative route description

As its official route description indicates, north of Holmwood, LA 27 also originally included a string of minor roads running north to Chloe, then east along what is now the I-10 service road through Iowa to LA 101 at Lacassine. By the 1970s, this mileage was largely eliminated. The only other realignment in LA 27 shifted the route onto a streamlined path through Sulphur in 1993. The original route initially became LA 27 Bus. but has since been renumbered to LA 1256 and partially eliminated from the state highway system.

== Major intersections ==
Note: The route is entirely signed north–south. The directional banners are reversed at the Cameron Ferry.

Parish	Location	mi	km	Destinations	Notes
Calcasieu	Holmwood	0.000	0.000	LA 14 – Lake Charles, Lake Arthur	Southeastern terminus
Calcasieu		4.026	6.479	LA 397 north	Southern terminus of LA 397
Cameron	Hacketts Corner	8.360	13.454	LA 384 west – Sweet Lake, Grand Lake	Northern end of LA 384 concurrency
Cameron	Hacketts Corner	8.855	14.251	LA 384 east	Southern end of LA 384 concurrency
Cameron	Gibbstown	13.311– 14.135	21.422– 22.748	Conway LeBleu Memorial Bridge over Gulf Intracoastal Waterway	
Cameron	Creole	22.631	36.421	LA 82 east – Oak Grove, Abbeville LA 1143 east (East Creole Highway)	Eastern end of LA 82 concurrency; western terminus of LA 1143
Cameron	Cameron	35.125	56.528	LA 1142 south (Beach Road)	Northern terminus of LA 1142
Cameron	Cameron	36.916	59.411	LA 1141	Northern terminus of LA 1141 (not signed)
Cameron	Cameron	37.996	61.149	Cameron Ferry across Calcasieu Ship Channel (tolled); 0.302-mile (0.486 km) ferry route not counted in official mileage	
Cameron	Holly Beach	46.925– 46.979	75.518– 75.605	LA 82 west (Gulf Beach Highway) – Johnson Bayou, Port Arthur	Western end of LA 82 concurrency
Cameron	Hackberry	64.962	104.546	LA 390 (West Main Street)	Eastern terminus of LA 390
Cameron	Hackberry	67.288– 67.364	108.290– 108.412	Bridge over Black Lake Bayou	
Calcasieu		71.406– 71.966	114.917– 115.818	Ellender Bridge over Gulf Intracoastal Waterway	
Calcasieu		73.835– 74.115	118.826– 119.277	Bridge over Choupique Bayou	
Calcasieu	Carlyss	77.207	124.253	LA 108 west – Southland Field LA 1133 north	Southern end of LA 108 concurrency; southern terminus of LA 1133
Calcasieu	Carlyss	80.396	129.385	LA 1256 north (Old Highway 27) to I-10 – Sulphur	Southern terminus of LA 1256
Calcasieu	Carlyss	81.443– 81.453	131.070– 131.086	LA 108 east	Northern end of LA 108 concurrency
Calcasieu	Sulphur	83.478– 83.853	134.345– 134.948	I-10 – Lake Charles, Beaumont	Exit 21 on I-10
Calcasieu	Sulphur	85.115	136.979	US 90 (East Napoleon Street) – Westlake, Edgerly	
Calcasieu		88.588	142.569	LA 379 (Houston River Road) – Westlake, Edgerly	Western terminus of LA 379
Calcasieu	DeQuincy	101.613	163.530	LA 12 east (East Fourth Street) – Ragley	Southern end of LA 12 concurrency
Calcasieu	DeQuincy	101.801	163.833	LA 12 west (East Fourth Street) – Starks	Northern end of LA 12 concurrency
Beauregard	Juanita	113.684	182.957	LA 109 south – Fields	Northern terminus of LA 109
Beauregard	Singer	116.230	187.054	LA 110 east – Longville	Southern end of LA 110 concurrency
Beauregard	Singer	116.355	187.255	LA 110 west – Merryville	Northern end of LA 110 concurrency
Beauregard	DeRidder	132.424	213.116	US 171 south / US 190 (West First Street, Shirley Street) – Merryville, Lake Charles, Baton Rouge US 171 north (North Pine Street) – Fort Johnson, Shreveport	Northwestern terminus; one-way pair; to Beauregard Regional Airport
1.000 mi = 1.609 km; 1.000 km = 0.621 mi: Concurrency terminus; Tolled

== Business route ==
Louisiana Highway 27 Business
- Location: Sulphur
- Length: 4.7 mi (7.6 km)
- Existed: 1993–2003

Louisiana Highway 27 Business (LA 27 Bus.) ran 4.7 miles (7.6 km) in a north–south direction from the junction of LA 27 and LA 108 in Carlyss to the junction of US 90 and LA 27 in Sulphur. The route followed the original alignment of LA 27 through Sulphur. It was renumbered as LA 1256 in 2003, and since then, has been partially returned to local control.

The entire highway is in Calcasieu Parish.

Location	mi	km	Destinations	Notes
Carlyss	0.0	0.0	LA 27 / LA 108 – Cameron	Southern terminus
Sulphur	2.1– 2.3	3.4– 3.7	I-10 – Lake Charles, Beaumont	Exit 20 on I-10
Sulphur	3.7	6.0	US 90 west (Napoleon Street)	Southern end of US 90 concurrency
Sulphur	4.7	7.6	US 90 east (East Napoleon Street); LA 27 (Maple Street, Lewis Street) – DeQuincy, Cameron	Northern terminus; northern end of US 90 concurrency
1.000 mi = 1.609 km; 1.000 km = 0.621 mi: Concurrency terminus
