= Louisiana's 27th State Senate district =

American legislative district

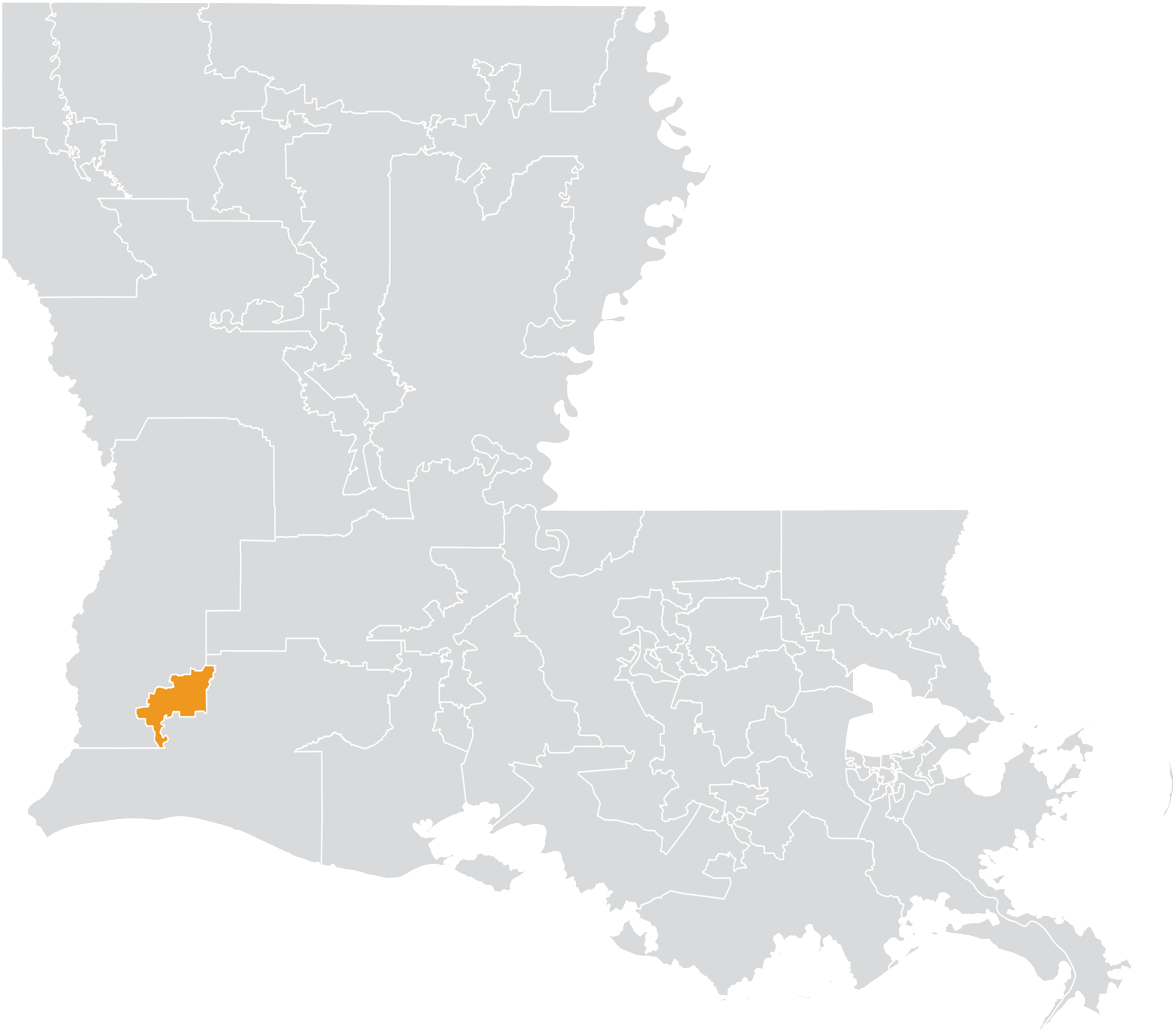
Senator
| Jeremy Stine; R |
- Registration: 44.0% Democratic; 27.6% Republican; 28.4% No party preference
- Demographics: 59% White; 35% Black; 4% Hispanic; 1% Asian; 2% Other
- Population (2019): 118,478
- Registered voters: 74,866

Louisiana's 27th State Senate district is one of 39 districts in the Louisiana State Senate. It has been represented by Republican Jeremy Stine since 2021.

== Geography ==
District 27 is primarily based in Lake Charles in Calcasieu Parish, taking in nearly the entire city proper as well as the suburban towns of Westlake, Moss Bluff, Prien, Carlyss, and Sulphur.

The district is located entirely within Louisiana's 3rd congressional district, and overlaps with the 33rd, 34th, 35th, and 36th districts of the Louisiana House of Representatives.

== Recent election results ==
Louisiana uses a jungle primary system. If no candidate receives 50% in the first round of voting, when all candidates appear on the same ballot regardless of party, the top-two finishers advance to a runoff election.

=== 2021 ===
2021 Louisiana State Senate special election, District 27
| Party | Candidate | Votes | % |
|---|---|---|---|
| Republican | Jeremy Stine | 9,313 | 59.2 |
| Democratic | Dustin Granger | 6,069 | 38.6 |
| Republican | Jake Shaheen | 357 | 2.3 |
| Total votes | | 15,739 | 100 |
| Republican hold | | | |

=== 2019 ===
2019 Louisiana State Senate election, District 27
| Party | Candidate | Votes | % |
|---|---|---|---|
| Republican | Ronnie Johns (incumbent) | Unopposed | 100 |
| Total votes | | Unopposed | 100 |
| Republican hold | | | |

=== 2015 ===
2015 Louisiana State Senate election, District 27
| Party | Candidate | Votes | % |
|---|---|---|---|
| Republican | Ronnie Johns (incumbent) | 14,648 | 65.0 |
| Democratic | Ginger Vidrine | 7,901 | 35.0 |
| Total votes | | 22,549 | 100 |
| Republican hold | | | |

=== 2011 ===
2011 Louisiana State Senate election, District 27
| Party | Candidate | Votes | % |
|---|---|---|---|
| Republican | Ronnie Johns | Unopposed | 100 |
| Total votes | | Unopposed | 100 |
| Republican gain from Democratic | | | |

=== Federal and statewide results ===
| Year | Office | Results |
|---|---|---|
| 2020 | President | Trump 56.9–40.9% |
| 2019 | Governor (runoff) | Edwards 58.1–41.9% |
| 2016 | President | Trump 55.1–40.9% |
| 2015 | Governor (runoff) | Edwards 65.0–35.0% |
| 2014 | Senate (runoff) | Cassidy 53.9–46.1% |
| 2012 | President | Romney 54.4–43.8% |
