= Louisiana's 33rd House of Representatives district =

American legislative district

Louisiana's 33rd State House of Representatives district
Representative
Les Farnum; R–Sulphur

Louisiana's 33rd House of Representatives district is one of 105 Louisiana House of Representatives districts. It is currently represented by Republican Les Farnum of Sulphur, who has previously ran (and lost) as a Democrat in the 2018 Special election.

== Geography ==
HD33 includes the cities of Sulphur and Vinton.

== Election results ==
Year	Winning candidate	Party	Percent	Opponent	Party	Percent	Opponent	Party	Percent
2011	Michael Danahay	Democratic	100%						
2015	Michael Danahay	Democratic	100%						
2018 - Special	Stuart Moss	Republican	54%	Les Farnum	Democratic	38.8%	Teri Johnson	Democratic	7.2%
2019	Les Farnum	Republican	56.4%	Stuart Moss	Republican	43.6%			
2023	Les Farnum	Republican	Cancelled						
