= Louisiana Highway 108 =

Highway in Louisiana, United States

Louisiana Highway 108

Route information
- Maintained by Louisiana DOTD
- Length: 24.8 mi (39.9 km)
- Existed: 1955 renumbering–present

Major junctions
- West end: I-10 in Vinton
- LA 27 in Carlyss; I-10 in Sulphur
- East end: US 90 in Sulphur

Location
- Country: United States
- State: Louisiana
- Parishes: Calcasieu

Highway system
- Louisiana State Highway System; Interstate; US; State; Scenic
← LA 107	→ LA 109

Louisiana Highway 108 (LA 108) is a state highway located in western Calcasieu Parish, Louisiana that runs 24.8 miles (39.9 km) in a general west–east direction from Interstate 10 (I-10) in Vinton to U.S. Highway 90 (US 90) in Sulphur. The highway runs in roughly a "U" shape along section line roads, dipping southward from Vinton then east parallel to I-10 and back to the north toward Sulphur. The majority of the route is signed west–east except for the eastern leg running north to Sulphur, which is signed north–south. The latter section is also the most travelled, providing access to the oil and petrochemical industry south of Sulphur and a connection to LA 27.

== Route description ==
From the west, LA 108 begins at an interchange with I-10 at Exit 8 in Vinton between the Texas-Louisiana state line and Sulphur. It proceeds east for 1.7 miles (2.7 km) to Gum Island Road then curves southward for another 3.0 miles (4.8 km) to Johnny Breaux Road. Here it curves back to the east, traveling 10.0 miles (16.1 km) and crossing a bridge over Bayou Choupique before reaching an intersection with LA 27 and LA 1133. LA 27 runs south into Cameron Parish while LA 1133 zigzags around the east side of Carlyss. LA 108 turns north, running concurrent with LA 27 for 3.2 miles (5.1 km) through Carlyss to an intersection with LA 1256, which heads due north to I-10 in Sulphur. From this intersection, LA 27 and LA 108 turn to the east, and LA 27 soon turns back to the north, also connecting with I-10 in Sulphur. LA 108 continues eastward, once again intersecting LA 1133, then turns north onto Cities Service Highway. After 1.3 miles (2.1 km), LA 108 crosses a bridge over Bayou D'Inde and enters Sulphur shortly thereafter. LA 108 enters into an interchange with I-10 and continues north for 1.4 miles (2.3 km) through the Maplewood area of Sulphur to a terminus at US 90 (East Napoleon Street).

LA 108 is an undivided, two-lane highway from its western terminus in Vinton to LA 1256 north of Carlyss. It then widens to a divided, four-lane highway from there to I-10 in Sulphur, after which the median is replaced by a center turn lane for the remainder of its route to US 90.

== History ==
In the original Louisiana Highway system in use between 1921 and 1955, the modern LA 108 made up parts of several routes, including State Route 381 from the western terminus in Vinton to the eastern curve at Johnny Breaux Road; State Route 382 to the modern junction with LA 27 and LA 1133 south of Carlyss; State Route 104 to the modern LA 1256 north of Carlyss; State Route C-1352 to the modern LA 1133 northeast of Carlyss; and State Route 382 again from there to the eastern terminus in Sulphur (with the section north of Bayou D'Inde Road later renumbered as State Route C-2102).

LA 108 was created with the 1955 Louisiana Highway renumbering, and its route has remained unchanged to the present day except for a small truncation on the western end. The original western terminus of LA 108 was located at the intersection of US 90 and Center Street in Vinton. LA 108 proceeded east on Center Street then turned south onto Gum Cove Road where it met the present western terminus at what is now the I-10 interchange. I-10 was opened parallel to US 90 through Vinton in September 1965, and the portion of LA 108 between the two highways was deleted from the state highway system around 1982, removing LA 108 from downtown Vinton.

== Major intersections ==
The entire highway is in Calcasieu Parish.

Location	mi	km	Destinations	Notes
Vinton	0.0	0.0	I-10 – Lake Charles, Beaumont	Western terminus; Exit 8 on I-10
Carlyss	14.9	24.0	LA 27 south – Cameron LA 1133 north	West end of LA 27 concurrency; southern terminus of LA 1133
Carlyss	18.1	29.1	LA 1256 to I-10 – Sulphur	Southern terminus of LA 1256
Carlyss	19.2	30.9	LA 27 north (South Beglis Parkway) to I-10 – Sulphur	East end of LA 27 concurrency
Carlyss	19.9	32.0	LA 1133 south	Northern terminus of LA 1133
Sulphur	23.4	37.7	I-10 – Lake Charles, Beaumont	Exit 23 on I-10
Sulphur	24.8	39.9	US 90 (East Napoleon Street) – Sulphur, Lake Charles	Eastern terminus
1.000 mi = 1.609 km; 1.000 km = 0.621 mi: Concurrency terminus
