= Will Dion =

American baseball player (born 2000)

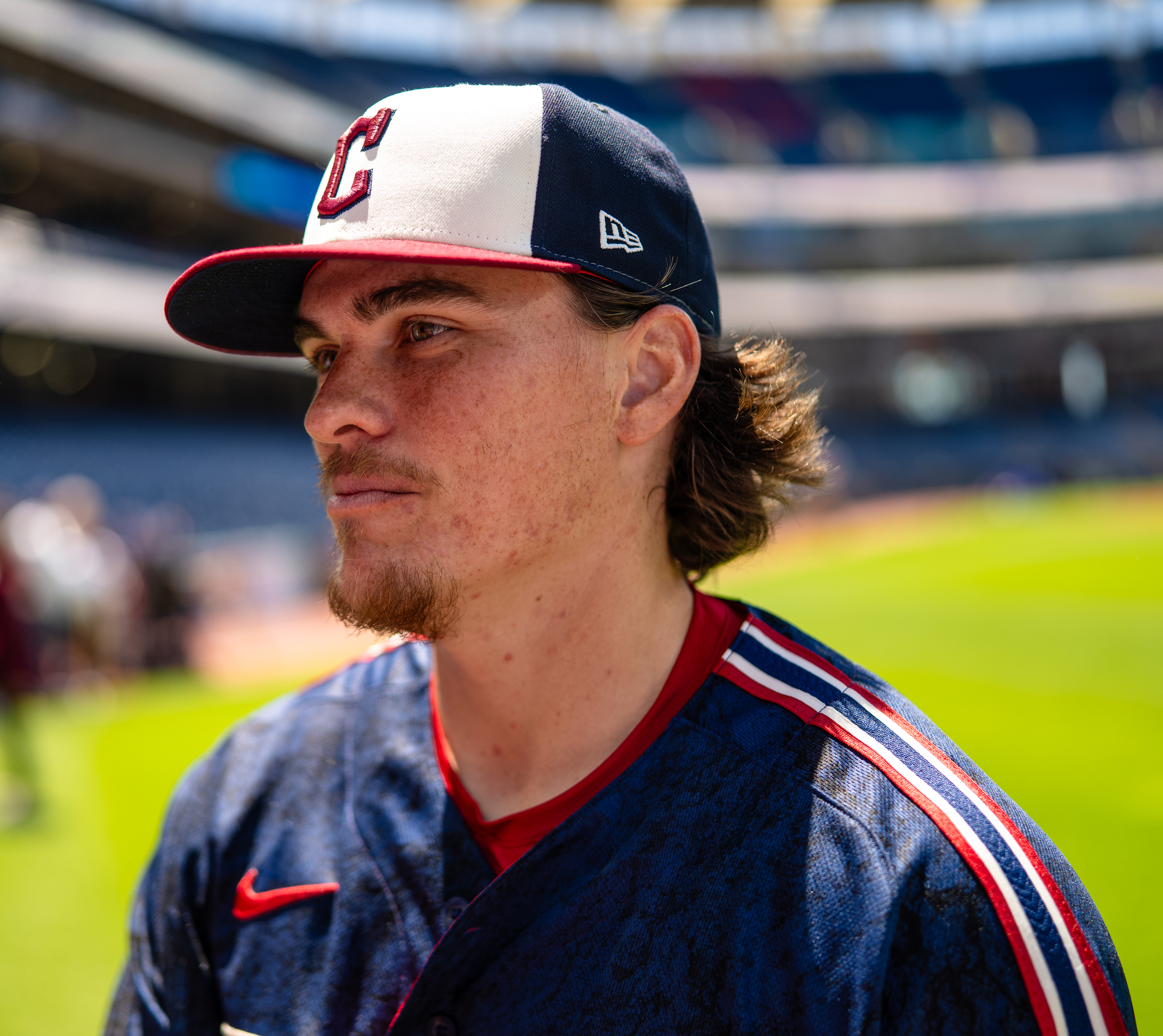
- Dion with the Cleveland Guardians in 2026

Washington Nationals – No. 76
- Pitcher
- Born: April 17, 2000 (age 26); Sulphur, Louisiana, U.S.
- Bats: Left Throws: Left

MLB debut
- May 26, 2026, for the Cleveland Guardians

MLB statistics (through 2026 season)
- Win–loss record: 3–2
- Earned run average: 3.62
- Strikeouts: 55
- Stats at Baseball Reference

Teams
- Cleveland Guardians (2026); Washington Nationals (2026–present)

William Chad Dion (born April 17, 2000) is an American professional baseball pitcher for the Washington Nationals of Major League Baseball (MLB). He has previously played in MLB for the Cleveland Guardians, with whom he debuted in 2026.

== Amateur career ==
Dion attended Sulphur High School in Sulphur, Louisiana, and played college baseball at McNeese State University. As a junior at McNeese State in 2021, he started 16 games and went 9–4 with a 3.07 ERA and a school-record 121 strikeouts.

== Professional career ==
=== Cleveland Indians / Guardians ===
The Cleveland Indians selected Dion in the ninth round (276th overall) of the 2021 Major League Baseball draft. He signed with Cleveland and made his professional debut with the Arizona League Indians and the Lynchburg Hillcats, throwing 12 scoreless innings between both affiliates.

Dion played the 2022 season with Lynchburg and Lake County Captains. Over 25 starts, he went 8–5 with a 2.11 ERA and 157 strikeouts over 128 innings. He opened the 2023 season with Lake County and was promoted to the Akron RubberDucks in mid-July. Over 26 games (19 starts) between the two teams, Dion went 6–4 with a 2.39 ERA and 129 strikeouts over 116 2/3 innings. Dion was assigned to the Columbus Clippers for the 2024 season. Over 27 starts, Dion went 4–4 with a 5.48 ERA and 116 strikeouts. He returned to Columbus for the 2025 season. Over 31 appearances (13 starts), Dion went 4–8 with a 4.09 ERA and 96 strikeouts over 99 innings.

Dion was assigned to Columbus to begin the 2026 campaign, where he posted a 3–0 record and 4.50 ERA with 36 strikeouts over his first 15 appearances. On May 26, 2026, Dion was selected to the 40-man roster and promoted to the major leagues for the first time. He made his MLB debut that night against the Washington Nationals and pitched three innings in relief in which he allowed two runs on five hits, no walks, and three strikeouts. He was optioned back to Columbus three separate times following his debut. Dion pitched in a total of 12 games for Cleveland and had a 4.58 ERA and 25 strikeouts across 19 2/3 innings.

=== Washington Nationals ===
On August 3, 2026, the Washington Nationals acquired Dion, alongside Josh Hartle, Nick Mitchell, and Kendeglys Virguez, from Cleveland in exchange for starting pitcher Foster Griffin. He was added to the Nationals' active roster following the trade. Dion pitched three scoreless innings out of the bullpen August 9, against the Cincinnati Reds, earning his first career win. He appeared in 15 games for Washington and ended the season with a 3–2 record, a 3.00 ERA, and 30 strikeouts over 30 innings.
