= Oretta, Louisiana =

- Census-designated place
- Location within Louisiana
- Coordinates: 30°31′44″N 93°26′21″W
- Country: United States
- State: Louisiana
- Parish: Beauregard

Area
  - Total: 2.20 sq mi (5.70 km^{2})
  - Land: 2.20 sq mi (5.70 km^{2})
  - Water: 0 sq mi (0.00 km^{2})
- Elevation: 98 ft (30 m)

Population (2020)
  - Total: 371
  - Density: 168.7/sq mi (65.14/km^{2})
- Time zone: UTC-6 (CST)
  - Summer (DST): UTC-5 (CDT)
- Area code: 337
- FIPS code: 22-58150
- GNIS feature ID: 2586698

Oretta is a census-designated place in Beauregard Parish, Louisiana, United States. As of the 2010 census, it had a population of 418.

In 2020, Oretta, Louisiana, had a population of 565

== Geography ==
Oretta is located in southern Beauregard Parish at 30°31′32″N 93°26′13″W. Louisiana Highway 27 leads through the center of the CDP, leading north 25 miles (40 km) to DeRidder, the parish seat, and south 5 miles (8 km) to DeQuincy in Calcasieu Parish.

According to the United States Census Bureau, the Oretta CDP has a total area of 2.2 square miles (5.7 km^{2}), all land.

== Demographics ==
Historical population
Census	Pop.	Note	%±
2010	418		—
2020	371		−11.2%
U.S. Decennial Census

Oretta was first listed as a census designated place in the 2010 U.S. census.
