= Jeremy Stine =

American politician (born 1980)

Majority Leader of the Louisiana Senate
- Incumbent
- Assumed office January 8, 2024
- Preceded by: Sharon Hewitt

Member of the Louisiana Senate from the 27th district
- Incumbent
- Assumed office February 1, 2022
- Preceded by: Ronnie Johns

Personal details
- Born: July 10, 1980 (age 46) Calcasieu Parish, Louisiana, U.S.
- Party: Republican
- Education: Louisiana State University (BA); Sciences Po Aix

Jeremy P. Stine (born July 10, 1980) is an American businessman and politician who is a member of the Louisiana State Senate for the 27th district.

== Early life and education ==
Stine was born on July 10, 1980, in Lake Charles, Louisiana. The Stine family is the owner of the Stine Lumber business, and journalist Theresa Schmidt of KPLC describes the family as "well-known." Stine graduated from Louisiana State University with a degree in political science and French.

== Career ==
Stine was part of the first French language immersion program launched by the Council for the Development of French in Louisiana.

Stine has previously worked as a legislative aide. Stine is the marketing director of his family's business, Stine Lumber, and serves as the president of the Alliance for Positive Growth.

=== Louisiana State Senate ===
On July 23, 2021, State Senator Ronnie Johns resigned to accept Governor John Bel Edwards’ appointment to the Louisiana Gaming Control Board. This left a vacancy in the 27th district seat. By July 26, Stine had announced his candidacy. Stine ran as a Republican. Two other candidates in the special primary ran to fill the vacancy: Republican Jake Shaheen and Democrat Dustin Granger. Granger is a financial planner and Shaheen is a school teacher. In the November 13 primary, Stine won the election outright, by receiving 59.2% of the vote. Stine plans to, during his swearing in ceremony, say the oath of office in both the English and French language.

Stine was described by Rachel Mipro of the Louisiana Illuminator as "anti-abortion, pro-gun rights and a supporter of the oil and gas industry."

Stine was elected as majority leader in December 2023 to succeed retiring senator Sharon Hewitt.

== Personal life ==
Stine and his wife, Emily, have three children.

Louisiana State Senate
Preceded by Sharon Hewitt	Majority Leader of the Louisiana Senate; 2024–present	Incumbent
