= Ronnie Johns (politician) =

American politician

Member of the Louisiana Senate from the 27th district
- In office 2012 – July 23, 2021
- Preceded by: Willie Mount
- Succeeded by: Jeremy Stine (elect)

Member of the Louisiana House of Representatives from the 33rd district
- In office 1996–2008
- Succeeded by: Mike Danahay

Personal details
- Born: July 14, 1949 (age 77) Bunkie, Louisiana, U.S.
- Party: Republican
- Spouse: Michelle
- Children: 1
- Education: University of Louisiana at Monroe (BS)

Ronnie Johns is an American politician from the state of Louisiana. A Republican, Johns represented the 27th district of the Louisiana State Senate, based in Lake Charles, from 2012 until 2021, when he accepted the position of chairman of the state's gaming control board. Johns previously represented the 33rd district of the Louisiana House of Representatives from 1996 until 2008.

== Career ==
Johns was a member of the Sulphur City Council from 1978 until 1982. In 1995, he was elected to the 33rd district of the Louisiana House of Representatives, where he served until 2008.

In 2011, Johns announced he would run for the 27th district of the Louisiana State Senate. He was elected without opposition, and was re-elected in 2015 and 2019. In 2020, Johns vied to become the next President of the Senate, but was defeated by fellow Republican Page Cortez.

In July 2021, he resigned as District 27 State Senator the day after missing the historic veto override session aimed at overturning Governor John Bel Edwards’ veto on Louisiana's Constitutional Carry Bill. Johns used the excuse that he had a “bum leg” due to a knee replacement surgery and could not travel for a minimum of 4 weeks per doctor's orders.

He was then appointed as Chairman of the Louisiana Gaming Board the very next day and said “he would assume his new position immediately” when he resigned from the District 27 State Senate Seat.

== Personal life ==
Johns lives in Sulphur with his wife Michelle; they have one daughter.
