= Johnson Bayou, Louisiana =

- Unincorporated community
- Location of Johnson Bayou in Louisiana
- Coordinates: 29°45′41″N 93°39′31″W
- Country: United States
- State: Louisiana
- Parish: Cameron
- Elevation: 3 ft (0.91 m)
- Time zone: UTC-6 (CST)
  - Summer (DST): UTC-5 (CDT)
- Area code: 337
- GNIS feature ID: 546421

Johnson Bayou is a small unincorporated community located on the Creole Nature Trail along the Gulf Coast in Cameron Parish, Louisiana, United States, and is named after Daniel Johnson, who came to the area circa 1790. The village is a barrier island spread across coastal chenieres which were formed by deltaic sedimentation by the shifting of the Mississippi River. This geologic formation, the coastal cheniere, is found only in a few locations across the globe. The population of the community was approximately 400 before Hurricanes Laura and Delta devastated the community in August and October of 2020. By September of 2021 the population had recovered to almost 300.

Johnson Bayou is part of the Lake Charles Metropolitan Statistical Area.

== History ==
On October 12, 1886, Johnson Bayou was completely destroyed by the "great storm of 1886;" a storm surge of between seven and twelve feet that swept inland at Johnson Bayou, killing between 50 and 100 people. Between Sabine Pass and Beaumont, thirty miles of track of the Sabine and East Texas Railway, were damaged badly and partly washed away.

Johnson Bayou was hit again by Hurricane Audrey in 1957, and yet again by Hurricane Rita on September 24, 2005. On September 13, 2007, Hurricane Humberto made landfall west of Johnson Bayou at High Island, Texas, bringing heavy rains to the community. On September 13, 2008, Hurricane Ike made landfall on the upper Texas coast, causing extensive damage to the region (NOAA).

In 2020, Johnson Bayou was struck by two hurricanes: Hurricane Laura on August 27, 2020 and Hurricane Delta on October 6, 2020. In 2026, Tropical Storm Edouard made landfall here as well.

== Geography ==
Johnson Bayou is located on a barrier island on Louisiana Highway 82, 12 miles (19 km) west of Holly Beach, and 28 miles (45 km) southeast, across the Sabine Pass channel, of Port Arthur, Texas.

== Culture ==
The Holleyman Bird Sanctuary/Peveto Woods Bird and Butterfly Sanctuary is located in the community, and is south of the Sabine National Wildlife Refuge. Johnson Bayou is home to four natural gas pipelines, and the home of one of the largest LNG Terminals in the world. This LNG regasification terminal is being built by Cheniere Energy.

== Education ==
Cameron Parish School Board operates Johnson Bayou High School, a combined primary and secondary school serving the area.

== Gallery ==
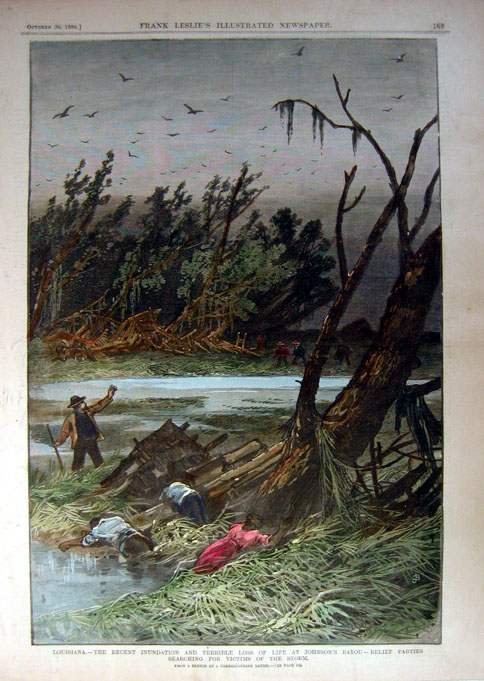
Destruction from the Great October Hurricane of 1886

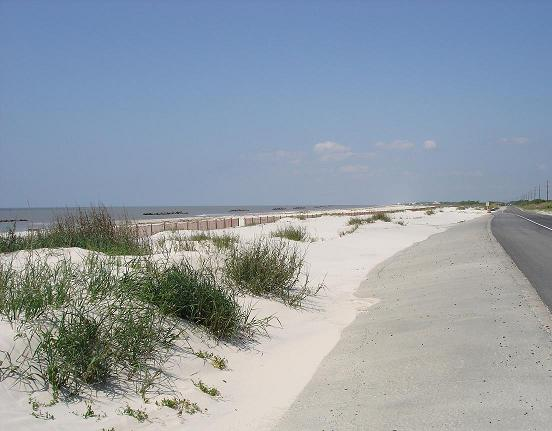
The beach between Johnson Bayou and Holly Beach prior to Hurricane Rita in 2005

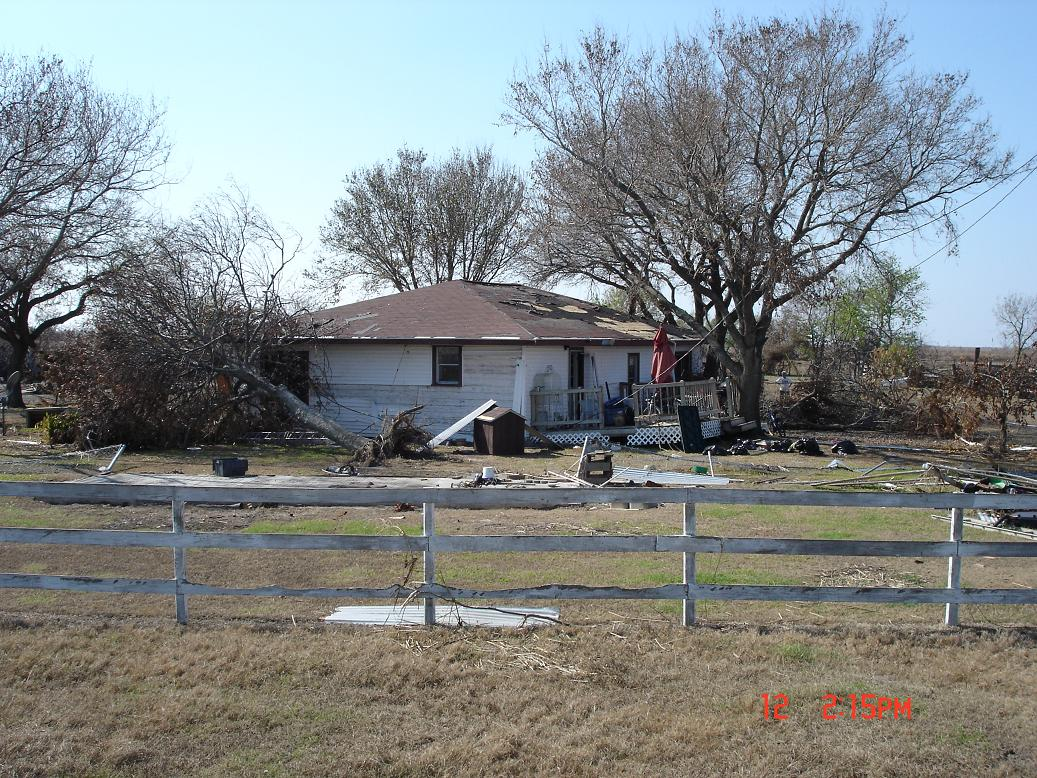
A house in Johnson Bayou destroyed by Hurricane Rita

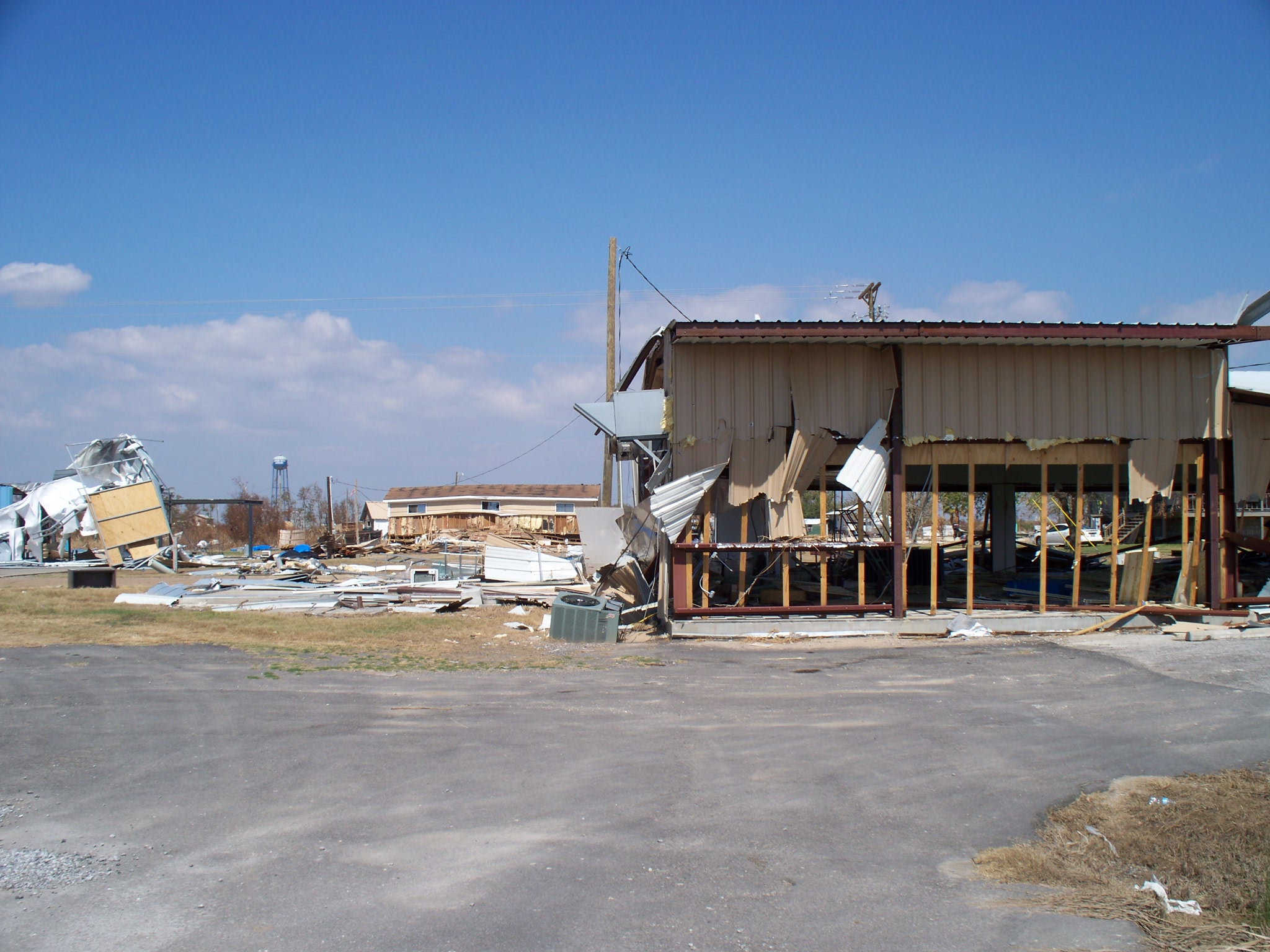
Hurricane Ike damage to main store and buildings

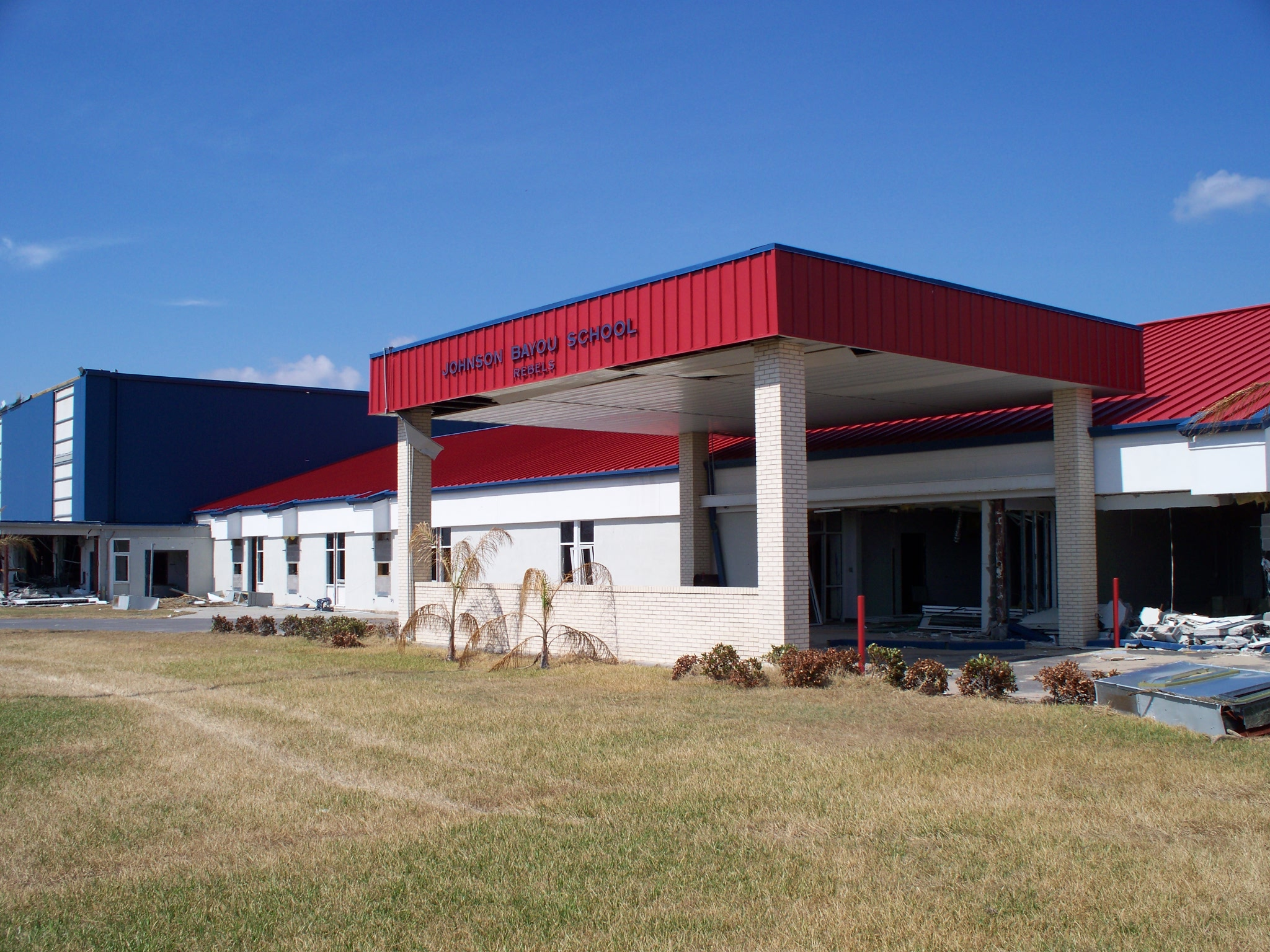
Hurricane Ike damage to school building

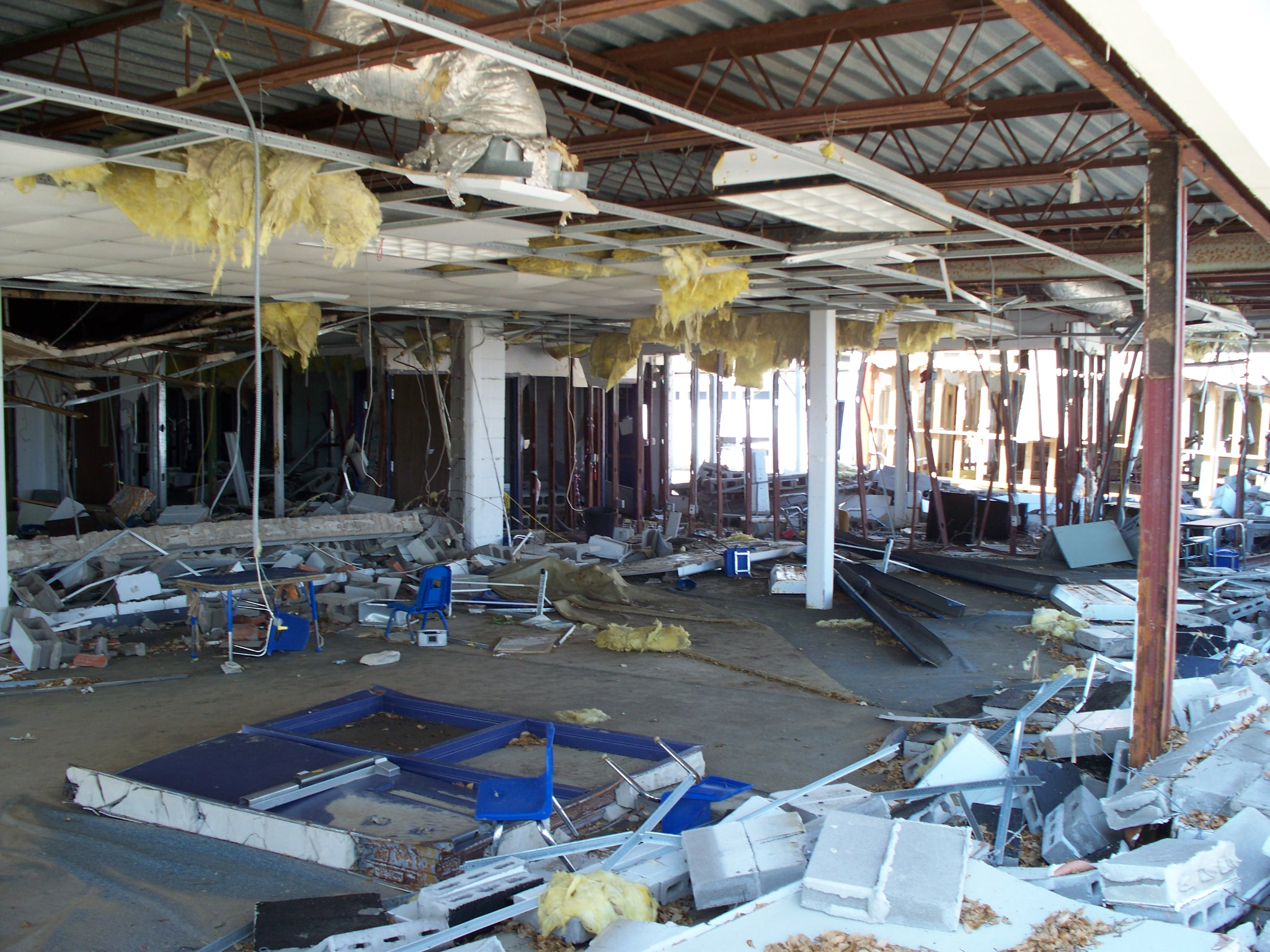
School suffered severe damage inside building due to Hurricane Ike

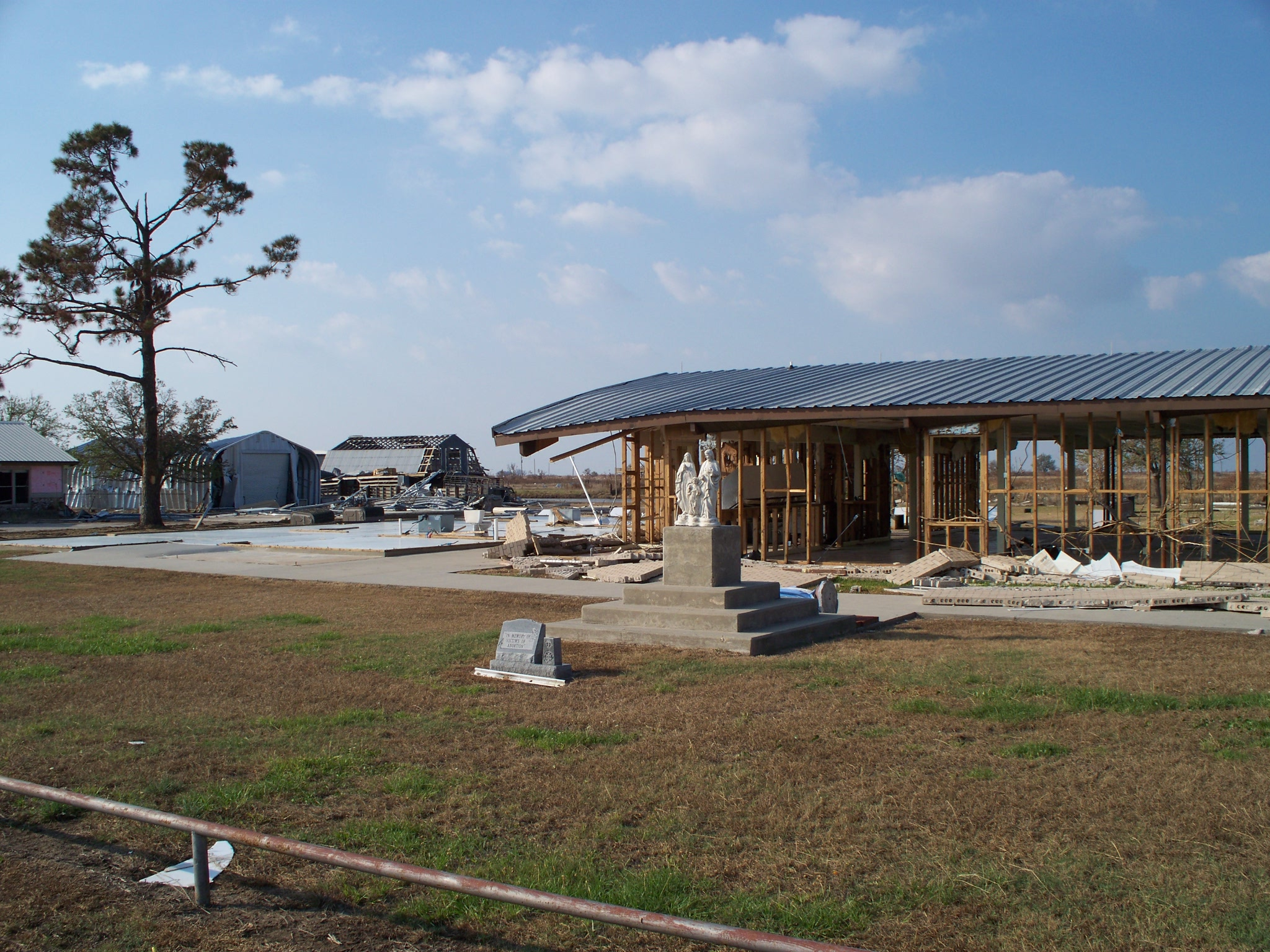
Church and buildings damaged by Hurricane Ike

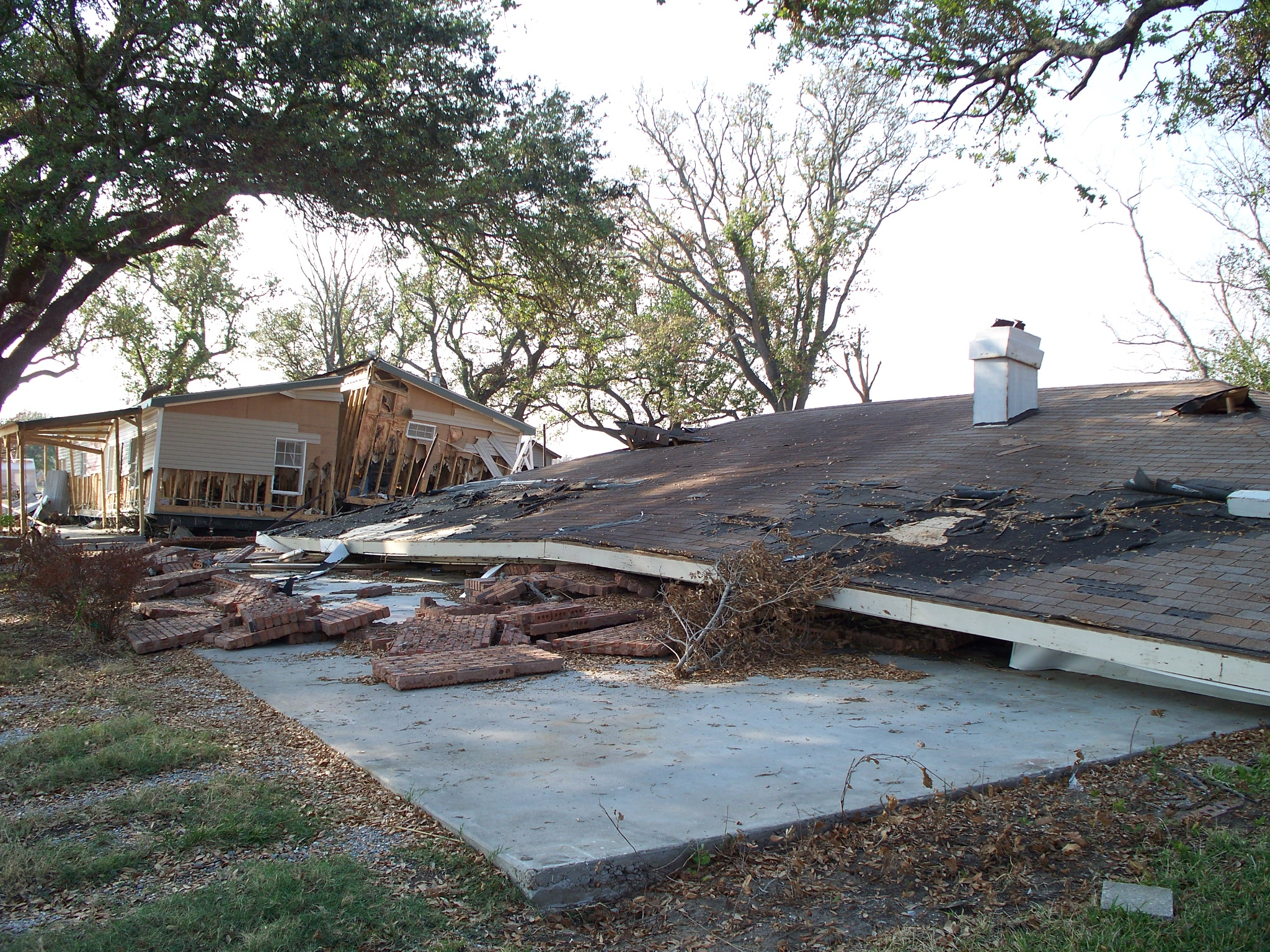
Brick house completely destroyed with nearby double wide house severely damaged from Hurricane Ike

== See also ==
- 1886 Atlantic hurricane season
