= Bellevue, Calcasieu Parish, Louisiana =

Bellevue, Louisiana
- Unincorporated community
- Location within Louisiana Location within the United States
- Coordinates: 30°11′33″N 93°05′04″W
- Country: United States
- State: Louisiana
- Parish: Calcasieu
- Elevation: 20 ft (6.1 m)
- Time zone: UTC-6 (Central (CST))
  - Summer (DST): UTC-5 (CDT)
- Area code: 337
- GNIS feature ID: 542978

Bellevue is an unincorporated community in Calcasieu Parish, Louisiana, United States.
