= Calcasieu Lake =

Lake in southwest Louisiana, United States

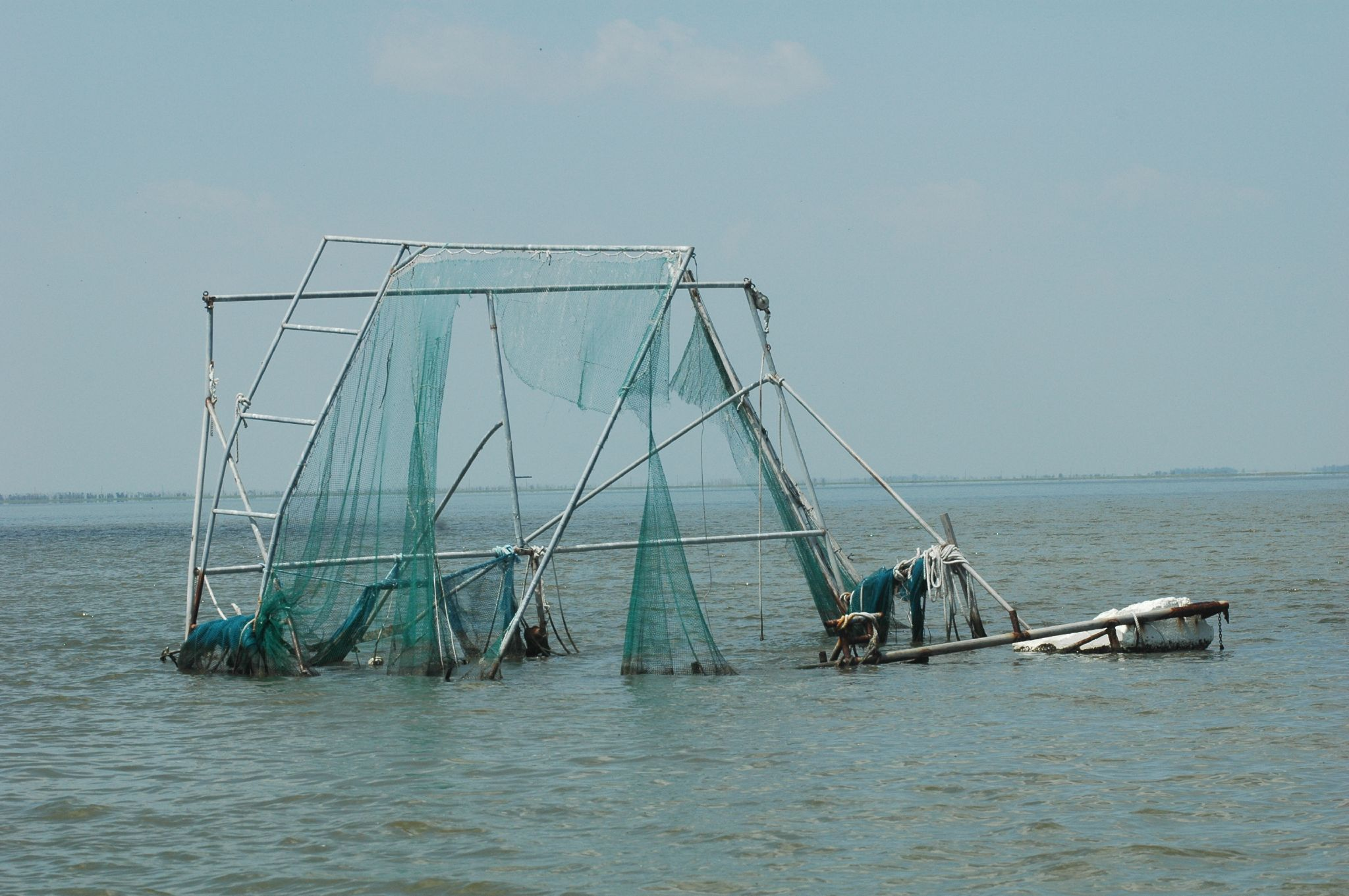
- Hurricane debris (2006)

- Location within Louisiana Location within the United States
- Location: Cameron / Calcasieu parishes, Louisiana, United States
- Coordinates: 29°54′01″N 93°16′58″W
- Primary inflows: Calcasieu River
- Basin countries: United States
- Surface area: 76.8 sq mi (199 km^{2})
- Average depth: 1 m (3.3 ft)

Calcasieu Lake is a brackish lake located in southwest Louisiana, United States, located mostly within Cameron Parish. The Lake, also known as Big Lake to the local population, is paralleled on its west shore by Louisiana Highway 27, and is located about 17 mi (27 km) south of Lake Charles, Louisiana. The lake is the natural outlet of the Calcasieu River. Commercial traffic uses the Calcasieu Ship Channel that runs down the west side of lake Charles and on the southern end splits Lake Charles from West Cove (with Rabbit Island) and exits the lake passing St Johns Island.

On June 24, 2007, a rare albino "pink" bottlenose dolphin, Pinky, was spotted by a charter fishing-boat captain based in Lake Charles.

== See also ==
- List of lakes of the United States § Louisiana
