= Pinky (dolphin) =

Albino bottlenose dolphin found in Calcasieu Lake, Louisiana

- Species: Bottlenose dolphin
- Sex: Female
- Born: June 2007; Calcasieu Lake, Louisiana, US
- Known for: Pink dolphin living in Calcasieu Lake, Louisiana
- Appearance: Pinkish/white hue due to albinism; visible blood vessels and reddish eyes

Pinky is an albino bottlenose dolphin found in Calcasieu Lake, Louisiana. Pinky was first spotted in June 2007 by a boat captain, Erik Rue. In 2015, Rue was able to capture photo evidence of Pinky mating, proving that she is female. The dolphin has become a tourist attraction, and conservationists have asked visitors to leave the dolphin alone. Pinky's behavior is similar to the rest of the dolphins in her pod, although she tends to spend more time underwater. The animal's popular name is derived from where it frequently lives as well as its skin hue.

== Coloring ==
Although it is quite rare to see an albino animal in the wild, Pinky has a few signs that appear to confirm her albinism. Blood vessels and eyes with a reddish hue can be seen through Pinky's skin, a key indicator that the cells that normally make the pigment melanin, are hardly active in this dolphin's body. Although albinism can be hereditary, it is unknown if Pinky's parents were of a pinkish/white hue or if they simply carried this specific gene mutation which they then passed down to Pinky.

In 2017, a video was taken showing two albino dolphins swimming in the lake, presumed to be Pinky and her calf.

== See also ==
- List of individual cetaceans
