= Carlyss, Louisiana =

- Census-designated place
- Location of Carlyss in Louisiana
- Coordinates: 30°10′35″N 93°22′36″W
- Country: United States
- State: Louisiana
- Parish: Calcasieu

Area
  - Total: 11.10 sq mi (28.74 km^{2})
  - Land: 11.06 sq mi (28.65 km^{2})
  - Water: 0.035 sq mi (0.09 km^{2})
- Elevation: 10 ft (3.0 m)

Population (2020)
  - Total: 5,101
  - Density: 461.1/sq mi (178.05/km^{2})
- Time zone: UTC-6 (CST)
  - Summer (DST): UTC-5 (CDT)
- ZIP code: 70665
- Area code: 337
- FIPS code: 22-12840
- GNIS feature ID: 2402749

Carlyss (pronounced ‘car-liss’) is a census-designated place (CDP) in Calcasieu Parish, Louisiana, United States. The population was 5,101 in 2020. It is part of the Lake Charles metropolitan statistical area.

== Geography ==
Carlyss is located south of the center of Calcasieu Parish and is bordered to the north by the city of Sulphur. Interstate 10 follows the northern border, with access from exits 20 and 21. I-10 leads east 10 miles (16 km) to Lake Charles and west 22 miles (35 km) to Orange, Texas. Louisiana Highway 27 runs through the center of Carlyss, connecting Sulphur to the north with Holly Beach on the Gulf of Mexico, 32 miles (51 km) to the south.

According to the United States Census Bureau, the Carlyss CDP has a total area of 11.98 square miles (31.03 km^{2}), of which 11.92 square miles (30.86 km^{2}) is land and 0.07 square miles (0.18 km^{2}), or 0.57%, is water.

== Demographics ==
Historical population
Census	Pop.	Note	%±
1980	1,806		—
1990	3,305		83.0%
2000	4,049		22.5%
2010	4,670		15.3%
2020	5,101		9.2%
U.S. Decennial Census; 1950 1960 1970 1980; 1990 2000 2010

Carlyss first appeared as a census designated place the 1980 U.S. Census.

Carlyss racial composition as of 2020
	Number	Percentage
White (non-Hispanic)	4,153	81.42%
Black or African American (non-Hispanic)	334	6.55%
Native American	27	0.53%
Asian	160	3.14%
Pacific Islander	6	0.12%
Other/Mixed	172	3.37%
Hispanic or Latino	249	4.88%

As of the 2020 United States census, there were 5,101 people, 1,773 households, and 1,252 families residing in the CDP.
