= Sulphur High School (Louisiana) =

Location
- 100 Sycamore Street; Sulphur, Louisiana; United States

Information
- Type: Public
- Established: 1913
- School district: Calcasieu Parish Public Schools
- Principal: Katherine Clophus
- Teaching staff: 140.28 (on an FTE basis)
- Grades: 9–12
- Enrollment: 1,992 (2023–2024)
- Student to teacher ratio: 14.20
- Colors: Blue and gold
- Mascot: Golden Tornado
- Nickname: Tors
- Yearbook: Tornado
- Website: sulphur.cpsb.org

Sulphur High School is a 5A public high school located in Sulphur, Louisiana, United States. It is a part of the Calcasieu Parish Public Schools. Students are offered a variety of Advanced Placement courses as well as opportunities for dual enrollment in classes at McNeese State University in Lake Charles, Louisiana. The Principal of the main campus is Katherine Clophus, and the Principal of the Ninth Grade Campus is Michael Fultz. The school also operates a Ninth Grade Campus, which opened during the 2004–2005 school year.

== Athletics ==
Sulphur High athletics competes in the Louisiana High School Athletic Association (LHSAA).

=== Championships ===
Football championships (4) State Championships: 1943, 1944, 1946, 1965

Esports championships (2) Overwatch Championships: 2022, 2023

== Notable alumni ==
- J. T. Chargois, baseball player
- Marcus R. Clark (Class of 1974), justice of the Louisiana Supreme Court
- Casey Daigle, baseball player
- Will Dion, baseball player
- Janice Lynde, actress, original cast member of the CBS soap opera The Young and the Restless for three years, then went on to ABC's One Life to Live and NBC's Another World
- Pat Rapp, baseball player
- John Thomson, baseball player
- Martin Zeno, professional basketball player
