= Les Farnum =

American politician

Member of the Louisiana House of Representatives from the 33rd district
- Incumbent
- Assumed office January 13, 2020
- Preceded by: Stuart Moss

Personal details
- Born: Sulphur, Louisiana, U.S.
- Party: Republican
- Spouse: Karen
- Children: 4
- Education: Sowela Technical Community College

Les Farnum is an American politician serving as a member of the Louisiana House of Representatives from the 33rd district. Elected in November 2019, he assumed office on January 13, 2020.

== Early life and education ==
Farnum was born in Sulphur, Louisiana. He graduated from the Sowela Technical Community College.

== Career ==
Farnum was a union electrician. He then worked as an energy consultant for Power and Control Systems in Baton Rouge, Louisiana. He was a power systems supervisor at Phillips 66 from 2008 to 2013. He was also a manager at Sasol. Farnum was an unsuccessful candidate for the Louisiana House of Representatives in 2018, losing to incumbent Republican Stuart Moss. Farnum defeated Moss in a rematch election in 2019 and assumed office in January 2020.
