= Peveto Woods Bird & Butterfly Sanctuary =

Protected area in Louisiana, US

The Peveto Woods Bird & Butterfly Sanctuary (formerly known as Hollyman-Sheeley Sanctuary) is a 40-acre Sanctuary that is reserved and maintained by the Baton Rouge Audubon Society. It is located on the Creole Nature Trail.

As many as two million birds use the sanctuary each year.

Scientists from the University of Southern Mississippi have used the sanctuary as a site for research on migrant songbirds since 1984.

== Location ==
LA 82, 8.5 miles west of LA 27/LA 82 intersection

Found directly at the center of the Trans-Gulf migration path on the edge of the Gulf of Mexico, Peveto Woods is a chenier habitat ecologically vital to a wide range of both birds and butterflies.

== History ==
In August 1984, through the generosity of Mr. Robert W. Holleyman of Lake Charles, Louisiana, and Dr. Carlton Sheely, III, of Baton Rouge, Louisiana, the first tract of six acres was purchased. Several small parcels were added in the following two years.

In July 1989, the Henshaw Sanctuary was created with the sale and donation of the unsold portions of the subdivision by Mr. H. Marsh Henshaw, III, of Sulphur. Subsequent additions of several undeveloped lots came in August 1990 and February 1992.

In 1993, 27 acres were added on the north side reaching up to La. Hwy. 82.

In 1994, one of the sand pits was filled in and replanted about six acres with 1,600 live oak seedlings.

Restoration projects of various kinds are ongoing.

== Activities ==
- Birdwatching
- Butterfly observation
- Nature photography

== Birds ==
In the fall, Peveto Woods is a last stop for food and rest as birds head south over the Gulf. In the spring, as birds cross the Gulf heading north, it is the first stop for food and rest.

Peveto Woods' avian visitors include the brightly plumed spring warblers, tanagers and orioles as well as more sought after species such as the Scarlet Tanager, Rose-breasted Grosbeak, Cerulean Warbler, and Cape May Warbler. Lucky birders may spot Townsend's Warbler, Hepatic Tanager and Hooded Oriole.

== Butterflies ==
Common sightings include the black, spicebush, Eastern tiger, zebra and pipevine swallowtails; the gorgone crescent and pearl crescents, red admiral, buckeye, cloudless sulphur, spring azure, variegated butterfly and gulf fritillaries butterfly, zebra longwing, hackberry butterfly, queen butterfly, viceroy, and red spotted purple butterflies. Late fall to early summer are the best times for sightings, but some remain year round.
