= Calcasieu Parish, Louisiana =

Parish in Louisiana, United States

Coordinates: 30.23°N 93.36°W

- Parish
- Parish of Calcasieu; Paroisse de Calcasieu (French)
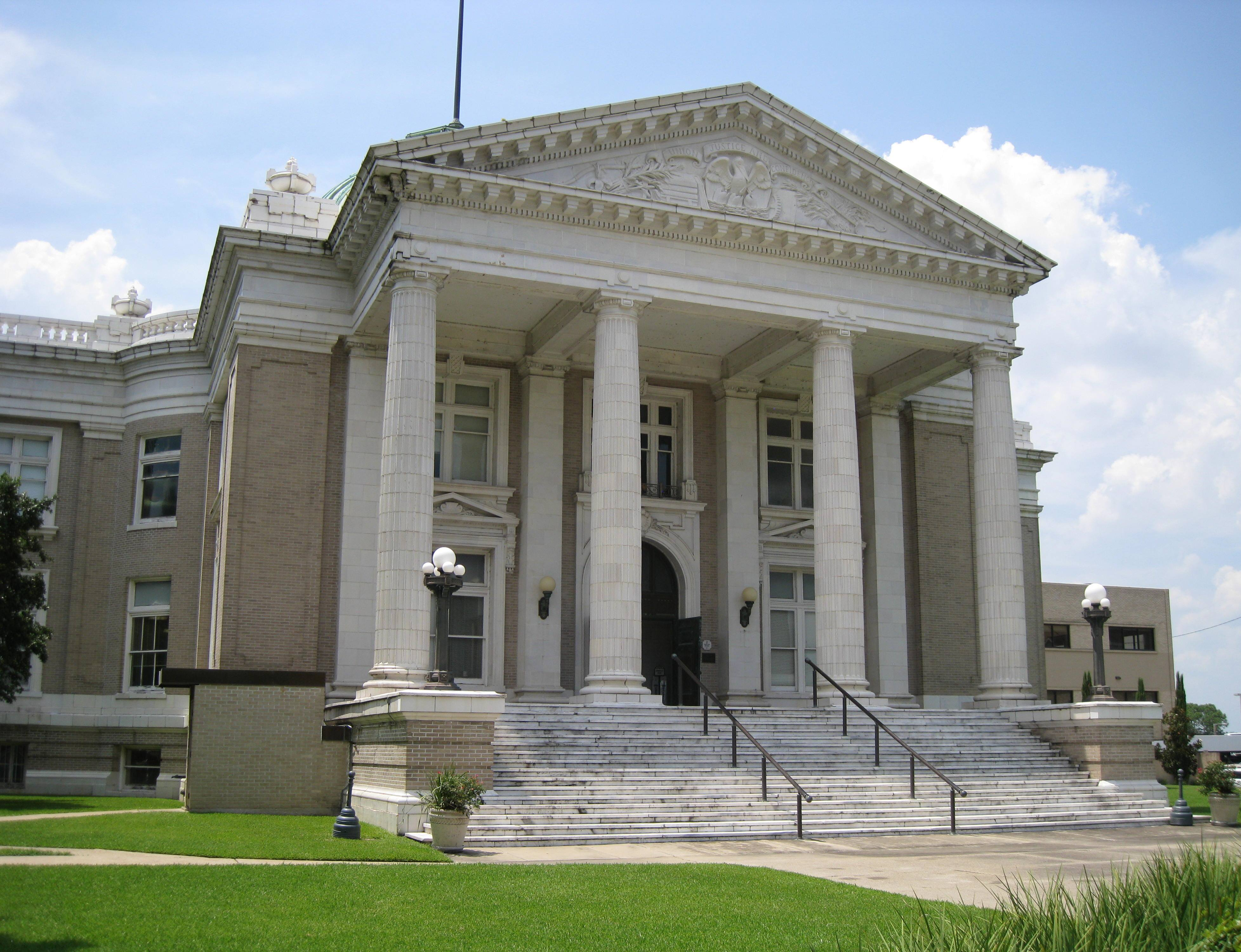
- Calcasieu Parish District Courthouse

- Seal

- Location within the U.S. state of Louisiana

- Louisiana's location within the U.S.
- Country: United States
- State: Louisiana
- Region: Acadiana
- Founded: March 24, 1840
- Named for: Atakapa leader Katkōsh Yōk ('Crying Eagle')
- Parish seat (and largest city): Lake Charles

Area
  - Total: 1,094 sq mi (2,830 km^{2})
  - Land: 1,064 sq mi (2,760 km^{2})
  - Water: 31 sq mi (80 km^{2}) 2.8%

Population (2020)
  - Total: 216,785
  - Estimate (2025): 208,466 ▼
  - Rank: LA: 7th
  - Density: 203.7/sq mi (78.67/km^{2})
- Time zone: UTC-6 (CST)
  - Summer (DST): UTC-5 (CDT)
- Congressional district: 3rd
- Website: Calcasieu Parish Police Jury

Calcasieu Parish (/ˈkælkəˌʃuː/; French: Paroisse de Calcasieu) is a parish located on the southwestern border of the U.S. state of Louisiana. As of the 2020 census, the population was 216,785. The parish seat and largest city is Lake Charles.

Calcasieu Parish is part of the Lake Charles metropolitan statistical area; it is also located near the Beaumont–Port Arthur (Texas), Lafayette, and Alexandria metropolitan areas.

Calcasieu Parish was created March 24, 1840, from the parish of Saint Landry, one of the original nineteen civil parishes established by the Louisiana Legislature in 1807 after the United States acquired the territory in the Louisiana Purchase of 1803. The original parish seat was Comasaque Bluff, a settlement east of the river and later called Marsh Bayou Bluff. On December 8, 1840, it was renamed as Marion, Louisiana.

In 1852 Jacob Ryan, a local planter and businessman, donated land and offered to move the courthouse in order to have the parish seat moved to Lake Charles. As the population in this area grew over the years, the original Calcasieu Parish has since been divided into five smaller parishes. The original area of Calcasieu Parish is called Imperial Calcasieu.

== Etymology ==
The name Calcasieu is traditionally explained as coming from the Atakapa language via French, which recorded the name of the Calcasieu River as "Quelqueshue" after the local Atakapa leader Katkōsh Yōk ('Crying Eagle'). An alternate etymology based upon the Spanish name for the river, Río Hondo, is that Calcasieu comes from an unrecorded Native American word meaning 'deep river'. A questionable folk etymology claims that after the United States acquired the region, a long-winded discussion over renaming the Río Hondo was ended by a frustrated francophone who suggested "name it quelque-chose" (English: 'anything'), which was recorded as "Calacasieu." A similar dubious folk etymology relies upon the French quelques choux (English: 'some cabbages').

Various spellings of 'Calcasieu' are found in early French- and English-language sources, including Calcasutt, Culqueshoe, Culkeshoe, Kelke-chute, Quelqueshue, Calcasu, Calcasiu, Quelqueshoe, and Calcasiew. The earliest version of the name—rivieére Calkousiouk—was published in 1807 by French explorer Charles César Robin. An older pronunciation, /kʌlkəʃuː/, was noted among older residents of the parish in 1927.

== History ==
=== Early history ===
The early history of the parish dates to the period of the Spanish occupation of Louisiana, after France had ceded this territory following its defeat by Great Britain in the Seven Years' War. In 1797, Jose M. Mora was granted a large tract of land between the Rio Hondo (now Calcasieu River) and the Sabine River, known for years as the "Neutral Strip" between Louisiana and Texas. The area became a refuge for outlaws and filibusters from Carolina, Georgia, and Mississippi of the United States, which had recently gained independence from Great Britain.

The territory was disputed for years between Spain and the United States after France had ceded Louisiana to the American government as part of the Louisiana Purchase of 1803. It was definitively acquired by the United States from Spain with the Adams-Onis Treaty in 1819. The treaty was formally ratified on February 22, 1821. By an act of Congress, approved on March 3, 1823, this strip of land was attached to the district of the Louisiana Territory south of the Red River.

Early settlers to the area included the LeBleu, Sallier, Ryan, Perkin, Hodges, Bilbo, Deviers, and Henderson families. Acadian settlers, from the eastern parishes of Louisiana, also migrated to this area. Of French descent and exiled by the British from Acadia (eastern Canada), many of these refugees had settled in Louisiana. The parish had a diverse ethnic mix of French and Spanish Creoles, Acadians, Anglo-Americans, Enslaved African Americans, Free African Americans, and Indians. Data compiled from historical volumes of the US Center of Population and Housing indicate that in 1850, 240 of 3914 Parish residents were "Free Men of Color". By 1860 that number had risen to 305 of 5928. The 1860 U.S. census of Louisiana counts 1171 Slaves among Calcasieu Parish residents.

=== "Imperial Calcasieu" era ===
Calcasieu Parish was created in 1840 from the Parish of Saint Landry. The new parish was the largest in the state, larger than either of the two smallest states, Delaware and Rhode Island. This size, which ultimately was divided into five parishes, led to the parish's nickname "Imperial Calcasieu."

On August 24, 1840, six men met at a private home near present-day Chloe to organize as the parish police jury representing six wards. The first order of business was to elect officers, appoint a parish clerk, and settle on simple parliamentary rules that would enable the president to keep the meetings orderly and progressive. The jury adopted all of the laws then in force in Saint Landry Parish. They appointed a parish constable, a parish treasurer, two parish assessors, and an operator of the ferry at Buchanan's crossing. The assessors were given two months to assess all of the property in the parish and a salary of $90.

On September 14, 1840, a survey was authorized of land known then as Marsh Bayou Bluff in order to establish a seat of justice (parish seat) and construct a courthouse and jail. On December 8, 1840, the jury chose to rename this community as Marion. In 1843, the Legislature authorized a vote to move the parish seat.

Finally in 1852, Jacob Ryan was successful in having the parish seat relocated from Marion to the east bank of Lake Charles. This parish seat was incorporated in 1857 as the town of Charleston; it was reincorporated in 1868 as Lake Charles. It is located about six miles (9.7 km) from Marion, now known as Old Town. The name Lake Charles commemorates one of the first European settlers, Charles Sallier, a Frenchman who acquired land in this area at the beginning of the 19th century.

=== Division ===
In 1870 Cameron Parish was created from the southern portion of Imperial Calcasieu. It was one of several parishes organized during the Reconstruction era by the Republican-dominated legislature, in an effort to build Republican strength. Many Freedmen had joined the Republican Party elsewhere in the state. However, while other areas of Louisiana had been developed as cotton plantations, Calcasieu Parish had not. Although the parish had been larger in land mass than the states of Delaware and Rhode Island it was primarily utilized as grazing land for cattle with no significant plantings of cotton, sugar cane or other crops requiring the utilization of slave labor. Therefore, Calcasieu before the Civil War was home to a lower percentile of African-American slaves than many other parts of the State.

In 1912 Calcasieu Parish still comprised an area of more than 3,600 square miles (9,300 km^{2}), and remained the largest parish in the state by geographic area. In 1912, "Imperial Calcasieu" was further divided with the creation of the three new parishes of Allen, Beauregard, and Jefferson Davis, with a total area of approximately 2,548 square miles (6,600 km^{2}). These were the most recent parishes organized in Louisiana. Following these jurisdictional changes, Calcasieu Parish lost almost half of its population between the 1910 and 1920 United States census.

== Geography ==
According to the U.S. Census Bureau, the parish has a total area of 1,094 square miles (2,830 km^{2}), of which 1,064 square miles (2,760 km^{2}) is land and 31 square miles (80 km^{2}) (2.8%) is water.

=== Major highways ===
- Interstate 10
  - Interstate 210
- U.S. Highway 90
  - US 90 Bus.
- U.S. Highway 165
- U.S. Highway 171
- Louisiana Highway 12
- Louisiana Highway 14
- Louisiana Highway 27
- Louisiana Highway 101
- Louisiana Highway 108
- Louisiana Highway 109
- Louisiana Highway 378
- Louisiana Highway 379
- Louisiana Highway 383
- Louisiana Highway 384
- Louisiana Highway 385
- Louisiana Highway 389
- Louisiana Highway 397
- Louisiana Highway 1138-1
- Louisiana Highway 1138-2
- Louisiana Highway 1138-3
- Louisiana Highway 1133
- Louisiana Highway 1256
- Louisiana Highway 1262
- Louisiana Highway 3020
- Louisiana Highway 3059
- Louisiana Highway 3063
- Louisiana Highway 3092
- Louisiana Highway 3112
- Louisiana Highway 3186
- Louisiana Highway 3256
- Louisiana Highway 3258

=== Adjacent counties and parishes ===
- Beauregard Parish (north)
- Jefferson Davis Parish (east)
- Cameron Parish (south)
- Orange County, Texas (west)
- Newton County, Texas (northwest)

=== Major waterways ===
- Lake Charles
- Calcasieu River
- Intracoastal Canal
- Ouiski Chitto Creek
- English Bayou
- West Fork
- Calcasieu Lake

== Hazardous Waste Sites ==
=== Calcasieu Estuary Bayou Verdine ===
Bayou Verdine is located in a heavily industrialized area; over 30 major companies are active nearby. The two companies responsible for cleaning up the bayou, Phillips 66 and Sasol North America (the cleanup parties), operate a petroleum refinery and a petrochemical complex. Both of these facilities have operated for decades, during which time their operations contaminated bayou sediments with polycyclic aromatic hydrocarbons (PAHs) and heavy metals. In 2003, the U.S. Environmental Protection Agency completed a remedial investigation for the Calcasieu Estuary. EPAs investigation found that contamination in Bayou Verdine did not pose a threat to people but was harmful to plants and animals. In 2010, Phillips 66 and Sasol signed a consent decree agreeing to clean up the bayou. EPA approved the removal action work plan in December 2011. Cleanup work began in September 2012. The cleanup parties first prepared a settling basin to receive sediments to be dredged from the bayou. Two pre-existing ponds on the refinery property had been created decades ago to provide fill for construction of nearby Interstate 10. One of these ponds (the east pond) was converted into the settling basin. It was emptied by pumping the water into the bayou. The bottom sediments were solidified by mixing in fly ash and a drainage system was placed at the bottom of the basin. Finally, the cleanup parties installed a flexible membrane liner on the bottom of the settling basin as an extra precaution. Bayou dredging followed. The cleanup parties used hydraulic dredging and mechanical excavation techniques to remove the top 1 to 2 feet of sediments from about 7,000 feet of the bayou on the Phillips 66 refinery property and downstream. The dredged sediment and water mixture (slurry) was then pumped through a pipeline to the settling basin, where the sediment was allowed to separate from the water by gravity settling. The water was tested and then released into the bayou in accordance with a discharge permit from the state. About 30,000 cubic yards of bayou sediments were placed in the containment cell. Dredging was completed in February 2014. During the cleanup process, EPA provided updates to the Calcasieu Estuary Task Force (a group of local leaders). EPA and the cleanup parties also provided fact sheets to the task force and others to keep the community informed during the cleanup.

=== Bayou d'Inde ===
==== What Happened ====
The banks of Bayou d’Inde have been industrialized since oil and natural gas deposits were discovered nearby in the 1920s. Chemical manufacturing and petroleum refining facilities have released toxins—including PCBs, dioxins, lead, and mercury—into the bayou and surrounding areas for decades.

Some of the potentially responsible parties (PRPs) began cleanup activities in late 2014 and they are expected to be completed by the end of 2018. Collectively they will dredge contaminated sediment from the main channel, use articulated concrete block mat technology for in-situ capping of approximately 36,000 square yards, and cap the remaining contaminated areas with clean sediment.

NOAA is currently working with the other trustees to ensure that sediment dredging and capping limits risks to the local ecosystem. We will also monitor contaminant levels in the bayou to track the long-term effects of the remediation.

==== What Were the Impacts? ====
Bayou d’Inde is a major tributary of the Calcasieu River, supporting a diverse ecosystem, including many types of fish, birds, and terrestrial and marine mammals. PCBs, dioxins, lead, mercury, and other contaminants have accumulated in the water and sediments of the bayou and its surrounding wetlands and floodplains.

Restrictions on consumption of fish and shellfish(link is external) from the bayou have been in place since 1987 due to elevated toxin levels. Swimming and other water-based recreation activities are also considered unsafe. In addition, contaminants from the bayou have contributed to a fish consumption advisory for the entire Calcasieu Estuary, first issued in 1992.

==== What's Happening Now? ====
NOAA and the other trustees have conducted a natural resource damage assessment in cooperation with the PRPs.

On October 15, 2018, the court approved an $11 million consent decree resolving claims pertaining to the discharge of hazardous substances into Bayou d'Inde. NOAA and other trustees will use settlement funds to pay for future natural resource restoration actions selected by the trustees.

On June 20, 2023, The Trustees of the Bayou d’Inde hazardous waste site published a Draft Restoration Plan/Environmental Assessment (RP/EA) that describes injuries to natural resources attributed to hazardous substances released into the environment and proposes certain restoration projects. The Trustee Council is accepting comments on the Draft RP/EA for a 30-day comment period open through July 21, 2023.

On July 19, 2024, the Final Restoration Plan/Environmental Assessment was released. The Trustee propose to proceed with the selected restoration activities after considering comments from the public scoping period.

=== Citgo Refinery - Calcasieu River Oil Spill - Calcasieu River, LA - June 2006 ===
==== What Happened? ====
On June 19, 2006, over 99,000 barrels of waste oil and millions of gallons of untreated oily wastewater overflowed from storage tanks and discharged into a containment area in CITGO’s Lake Charles Manufacturing Complex. An estimated 54,000 barrels of waste oil and an undetermined amount of oily wastewater flowed out of the containment area and into the Indian Marais, the Calcasieu River, and adjoining waterways in the Calcasieu Estuary.

==== What Were the Impacts? ====
Approximately 150 linear miles of shoreline habitats were affected by the spill, including hundreds of acres of marsh, intertidal, and subtidal sediments. The oil directly impacted fish, benthic organisms, and several species of birds, including secretive marsh birds such as rails and larger birds such as gulls.

The released oil was in a highly volatile and acutely toxic form, requiring initial closure of oiled areas to responders and natural resource damage assessment teams. The highly toxic compounds in the oil were soluble, resulting in significant mixing into the water column. Between June 23 and June 28, numerous fish kills were observed in and around the floating oil.

In the days following the spill, fishing and other recreational activities in the area were shut down.

==== What’s Happening Now? ====
On August 31, 2021, the U.S. Department of Justice finalized a Consent Decree valued at $19.69 million to restore natural resources injured by the Citgo Refinery oil spill.

This Consent Decree settled claims of injuries and will go towards restoration projects that benefit habitats, fish, wildlife, and outdoor recreational activities impacted by the oil spill.

On February 24, 2022, the trustees released the Final Damage Assessment and Restoration Plan, with selected projects to restore the resources injured by the spill. The selected restoration projects include

- Restoring 392 acres of saline marsh, including tidal creeks, in shallow open water in Cameron Parish, Louisiana,
- Creating approximately 18 acres of oyster reef habitat in Cameron Parish, Louisiana and,
- Contributing to an ongoing large project to create suitable nesting habitat for coastal island nesting birds in Terrebonne Bay, Terrebonne Parish, Louisiana

With the projects identified in this Final Restoration Plan, the trustees aim to restore approximately 432 acres of habitat near the Calcasieu estuary to compensate for injuries to shoreline habitats, oysters and birds.

== Communities ==
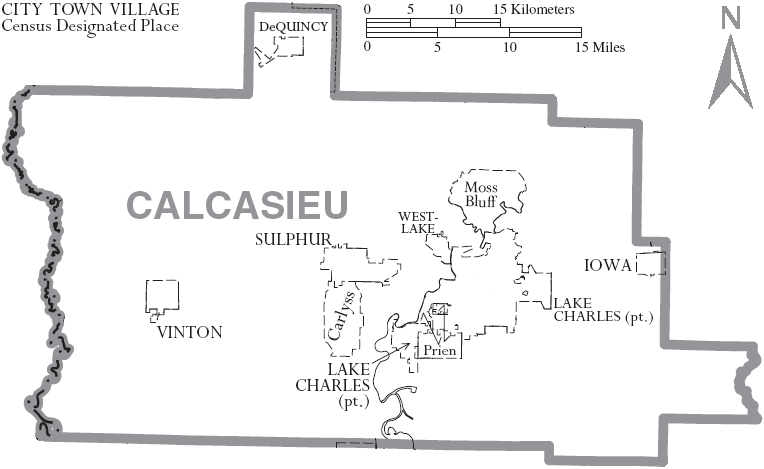
Map of Calcasieu Parish, Louisiana with municipal labels.

=== Cities ===
- DeQuincy
- Lake Charles (parish seat and largest municipality)
- Sulphur
- Westlake

=== Towns ===
- Iowa
- Vinton

=== Unincorporated areas ===
==== Census-designated places ====
- Carlyss
- Gillis
- Hayes
- Moss Bluff
- Prien
- Starks

==== Other communities ====
- Bell City
- Bellevue
- Holmwood
- Mossville that was taken over by Sasol.

== Demographics ==
Historical population
Census	Pop.	Note	%±
1840	2,057		—
1850	3,914		90.3%
1860	5,928		51.5%
1870	6,733		13.6%
1880	12,484		85.4%
1890	20,176		61.6%
1900	30,428		50.8%
1910	62,767		106.3%
1920	32,807		−47.7%
1930	41,963		27.9%
1940	56,506		34.7%
1950	89,635		58.6%
1960	145,475		62.3%
1970	145,415		0.0%
1980	167,223		15.0%
1990	168,134		0.5%
2000	183,577		9.2%
2010	192,768		5.0%
2020	216,785		12.5%
2025 (est.)	208,466	▼	−3.8%
U.S. Decennial Census; 1790-1960 1900-1990; 1990-2000 2010-2019

Calcasieu Parish, Louisiana – Racial and ethnic composition Note: the US Census treats Hispanic/Latino as an ethnic category. This table excludes Latinos from the racial categories and assigns them to a separate category. Hispanics/Latinos may be of any race.
Race / Ethnicity (NH = Non-Hispanic)	Pop 1980	Pop 1990	Pop 2000	Pop 2010	Pop 2020	% 1980	% 1990	% 2000	% 2010	% 2020
White alone (NH)	128,321	126,922	133,716	133,703	137,110	76.74%	75.49%	72.84%	69.36%	63.25%
Black or African American alone (NH)	35,851	38,265	43,769	47,490	54,825	21.44%	22.76%	23.84%	24.64%	25.29%
Native American or Alaska Native alone (NH)	263	362	532	836	902	0.16%	0.22%	0.29%	0.43%	0.42%
Asian alone (NH)	403	568	1,163	2,052	3,797	0.24%	0.34%	0.63%	1.06%	1.75%
Native Hawaiian or Pacific Islander alone (NH)	x	x	45	76	137	x	x	0.02%	0.04%	0.06%
Other race alone (NH)	152	170	213	514	853	0.09%	0.10%	0.12%	0.27%	0.39%
Mixed race or Multiracial (NH)	x	x	1,676	3,152	7,777	x	x	0.91%	1.64%	3.59%
Hispanic or Latino (any race)	2,233	1,847	2,463	4,945	11,384	1.34%	1.10%	1.34%	2.57%	5.25%
Total	167,223	168,134	183,577	192,768	216,785	100.00%	100.00%	100.00%	100.00%	100.00%

According to the 2020 United States census, there were 216,785 people, 77,232 households, and 53,308 families residing in the parish. In 2010, 70.8% of the population were White, 24.9% Black or African American, 1.1% Asian, 0.5% Native American, 0.9% of some other race and 1.9% of two or more races. 2.6% were Hispanic or Latino (of any race); 24.9% were of French, French Canadian or Cajun, 8.4% American, 6.2% Irish, 6.2% English and 6.1% German ancestry. In 2020, the racial and ethnic makeup was 63.25% non-Hispanic white, 25.29% Black or African American, 0.42% Native American, 1.75% Asian, 0.06% Pacific Islander, 3.98% other or two or more races, and 5.25% Hispanic or Latino of any race.

In 2010, were 73,996 households, out of which 35.60% had children under the age of 18 living with them, 52.60% were married couples living together, 14.70% had a female householder with no husband present, and 28.50% were non-families. 24.00% of all households were made up of individuals, and 8.90% had someone living alone who was 65 years of age or older. The average household size was 2.61 and the average family size was 3.11.

In the parish, 27.40% of the population was under the age of 18, 10.30% from 18 to 24, 28.70% from 25 to 44, 21.80% from 45 to 64, and 11.90% was 65 years of age or older. The median age was 34 years. For every 100 females there were 94.80 males. For every 100 females age 18 and over, there were 91.30 males.

The median income for a household in the parish was $35,372, and the median income for a family was $41,903. Males had a median income of $36,569 versus $21,390 for females according to the 2010 census. The per capita income for the parish was $17,710. About 12.80% of families and 15.40% of the population were below the poverty line, including 19.90% of those under age 18 and 14.20% of those age 65 or over.

== Law and government ==
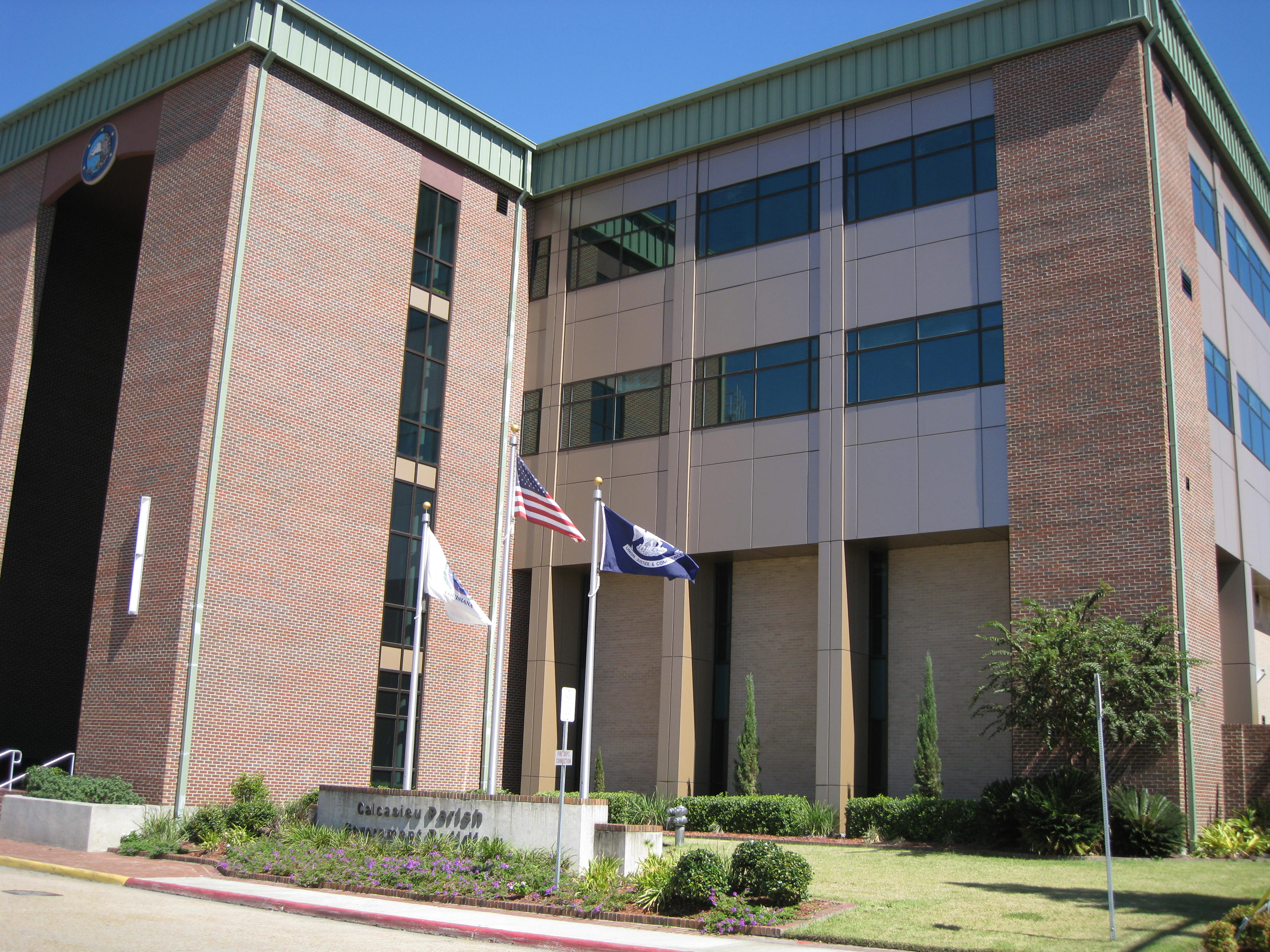
Calcasieu Parish Police Jury building

Calcasieu Parish is governed by an elected body known as the Police Jury. Some 15 single-member districts have been defined, with a population of approximately 12,200 persons per district (based on the 2000 census). Each district elects one Juror for representation, in keeping with the ruling by the U.S. Supreme Court of the "one man, one vote" principle.

The Court had found that Louisiana and a number of other states had failed to reapportion their state legislatures for decades, in many cases keeping representation based on geographic boundaries, such as counties or parishes, rather than population. This had resulted in under-representation for decades of urban and industrialized districts in the state legislature. Redistricting was also required at the parish level for election of police juries. By the constitution, reapportionment (or redistricting) of the parish is required following each official census. This can change the boundaries of the single-member districts, to ensure that each Juror represents approximately the same number of people.

A 2003 report found that the office of the public defender in Calcasieu Parish used an expert in only 1 of 171 cases. The criminal defense lawyers in that parish visited their clients in jail in only 1 out of 14 cases.

=== Courthouse ===
The first courthouse erected at Marion, a crudely built log cabin, was completed in August 1841. When the seat of justice was changed to Lake Charles in 1852, Sheriff Jacob Ryan with the help of his slave, Uncle George, and the aid of his good friend and fellow landowner, Samuel Adams Kirby, loaded the log cabin courthouse on an ox cart and transported the small building through the piney woods to Lake Charles. A new wooden courthouse was completed within a year.

This courthouse was replaced in 1891 by a colonial-style brick building erected at a cost of $20,000. In 1902 the parish added an annex to this building. A disastrous fire on April 23, 1910, destroyed the courthouse as well as most of downtown Lake Charles. Many of the records of the parish were burned or damaged. On April 4, 1911, the Police Jury decided to build a new courthouse on the old site.

It is a brick and terracotta structure completed in 1912 at a cost of $200,000. It is a replica of the famous Villa Copra, known as the Rotunda in Vicenza. The villa was designed by noted Italian architect, Andrea Palladio. His work became internationally known in the 17th and 18th centuries, and was influential both in Great Britain and the United States. Calcasieu Parish's replica was designed by Favrot and Livaudais of New Orleans. The dome atop the courthouse is of solid copper.

An annex containing two additional court rooms and additional space for the Clerk of Court and the Police Jury was added in the year 1958. Another annex for the Third Circuit Court of Appeals of the State of Louisiana was completed in 1960.

In 1967, a Parish Government Building was completed to house the various offices of the Police Jury. This building was expanded in 2003, and houses the following departments: Office of the Parish Administrator, Records Department, Division of Finance/Purchasing, Facilities Management, Human Resources Department, Division of Planning and Development, Division of Engineering and Public Works, and the Government Access Channel.

In 1987, a new building was constructed to house the District Attorney's Office. A new state-of-the-art correctional center was completed in 1990 to replace the old jail, which was constructed in 1956. A separate building was completed in 1991 for the Third Circuit Court of Appeals. A Judicial Center was constructed on the site of the old jail to house the Fourteenth Judicial District, and was completed in March 1994.

Between 1993 and 1998 an extensive interior and exterior restoration and renovation was performed on the 1912 Parish Courthouse. The Courthouse houses several offices, including the Clerk of Court, Juvenile and Family Court, Registrar of Voters, Sheriff's Civil Division, Veterans Affairs Office, and others.

=== Law enforcement ===
Calcasieu Parish Sheriff's Office
- Abbreviation: CPSO
- Motto: Duty, Respect and Trust

Agency overview
- Formed: 1840
- Employees: 980

Jurisdictional structure
- General nature: Local civilian police

Operational structure
- Headquarters: Lake Charles, Louisiana
- Sworn members: 980
- Agency executive: Gary “Stitch” Guillory, Sheriff
- Divisions: 9: Administration; Special Services; Enforcement; Civil; Programs; Corrections; Law Enforcement Centers; Investigations; Security Enforcement

Facilities
- Law Enforcement Centers: 10: Bell City/Hayes; Carlyss; Central Lake Charles; DeQuincy; Iowa; Moss Bluff; South Lake Charles; Starks; Sulphur; Vinton
- Corrections Facilities: 2: Calcasieu Correctional Center; Calcasieu Sheriff's Prison
- Patrol Cars: Ford Taurus Police Interceptor, Chevrolet Tahoe, Dodge Charger
- Patrol Motorcycles: Harley Davidson Road King
- Fixed wings: 1
- Polica Dogs: Yes

Website
- cpso.com

The primary law enforcement for the parish is the Calcasieu Parish Sheriff's Office. In 2016, employees of the office were amongst the lowest-paid in the region.

The Louisiana State Police is the primary law enforcement on state highways within the parish.

== Education ==
Public schools in all parts of the parish are operated by the Calcasieu Parish School Board.

It is in the service area of Sowela Technical Community College.

Lake Charles, the largest city in Calcasieu Parish, is home to McNeese State University.

== National Guard ==
Elements of the 256th IBCT and the 139TH RSG (Regional Support Group) are based in Lake Charles. The 256th IBCT deployed to Iraq twice, 2004-5 and 2010. De Quincy is the home of H Company of the 199th Forward Support Battalion which is a detachment of 3-156th Infantry Battalion. The Battalion's HHC is located in Lake Charles. These units deployed to Iraq with the 256TH IBCT.

== Notable people ==
- Mark Abraham (born 1953), politician elected in 2015 as state representative for Calcasieu Parish, was sworn in January 2016.
- Ken Bahnsen (born 1930), former NFL fullback and collegiate football and tennis coach. Member of the Athletic Hall of Fame at the University of North Texas.
- James W. Bryan (1834–1897), Louisiana state politician
- Terry Burrows (Born 1968), former Major League Baseball pitcher and head baseball coach at McNeese State University.
- A.C. Clemons (1921–1992), Democratic politician elected to the Louisiana State Senate. He switched parties and became the first declared Republican member of the state senate since the Reconstruction era. His district included part of Calcasieu Parish.
- Casey Daigle (born 1981), former Major League Baseball pitcher. Husband of American Olympic gold medalist Jennie Finch.
- Mike Danahay, Democratic state representative for Calcasieu Parish since 2008; sales representative in Lake Charles; formerly resided in Sulphur and Vinton
- Alvin Dark (1922–2014) former Major League Baseball player and manager
- Michael E. DeBakey (1908–2008), heart surgeon; first person to successfully implant an artificial heart (1963); member of the Health Care Hall of Fame; recipient of the United Nations Lifetime Achievement Award, the Presidential Medal of Freedom with Distinction, and the National Medal of Science; originator of the M.A.S.H. unit concept.
- Sean Patrick Flanery (born 1965), is an American actor, author and martial artist.
- Dan Flavin (born 1957), Republican former member of the Louisiana House of Representatives from Calcasieu and Cameron parishes. He operates a real estate office in Lake Charles.
- 1LT. Douglas B. Fournet (1943–1968), Medal of Honor recipient killed-in-action in the Vietnam War.
- Lether Frazar (1904–1960), university administrator, was the fourth president of McNeese State University, the second president of the University of Louisiana at Lafayette, and a former member of the Louisiana House of Representatives.
- Gilbert Franklin Hennigan (1883–1960), served in the Louisiana Senate from Allen, Beauregard, Calcasieu, Cameron, and Jeff Davis parishes from 1944 to 1956. He was born in Meadows in Calcasieu Parish and also lived in Beauregard Parish.
- Harry Hollins, state representative for Calcasieu Parish from 1964 to 1980.
- Ronnie Johns (born 1949), a State Farm Insurance agency owner in Sulphur who served in the Louisiana House of Representatives from 1996 to 2008; he was unopposed for the state senator from District 27 in 2011.
- Charlie Joiner (born 1947), former NFL wide receiver and member of the Pro Football Hall of Fame.
- Ralph Waldo Emerson Jones (1905–1982), former football and baseball coach and later president at Grambling State University.
- Robert G. "Bob" Jones (born 1939), a Lake Charles stockbroker, served in both houses of the Louisiana legislature between 1968 and 1976. He later switched to the Republican Party after running unsuccessfully in the 1975 gubernatorial primary.
- Sam Houston Jones (1897–1978), born and raised in nearby Beauregard Parish, he practiced law in Lake Charles for years prior to his election as governor in 1940.
- Eddie Kennison (born 1973), former LSU and NFL and wide receiver. Member of Louisiana Sports Hall of Fame.
- Bobby Kimball (born 1947), former lead singer and original member of the band Toto.
- Tony Kushner (born 1956), Pulitzer Prize-winning playwright
- Conway LeBleu (1918–2007), a Lake Charles native who represented Cameron and part of Calcasieu parishes in the Louisiana House from 1964 to 1988.
- Zachary Levi (born 1980), American actor, comedian, and singer.
- Coleman Lindsey (1892–1968), born in a part of Calcasieu Parish that is now the Dry Creek community of Allen Parish. He was a state senator from Bossier and Webster parishes, lieutenant governor from 1939 to 1940, and a state court district judge in East Baton Rouge Parish from 1950 until his death.
- Nate Livings (born 1982), former NFL offensive lineman.
- Janice Lynde (born 1948), American actress and original cast member of The Young and the Restless.
- Ted Lyons (1900–1986), former Major League Baseball pitcher and manager. 1955 inductee to the Baseball Hall of Fame.
- Tommy Mason (1939–2015), former professional American football player in the NFL. First overall pick of the 1961 NFL draft.
- Dak Prescott (born 1993), current quarterback for the Dallas Cowboys of the NFL.
- Trey Quinn (born 1995), professional athlete for the Jacksonville Jaguars of the NFL.
- Rupert Richardson (1930–2008), African-American civil rights activist and civil rights leader who served as president of the National Association for the Advancement of Colored People (NAACP) from 1992 to 1995.
- Wilbert Rideau (born 1943), was a winner of the George Polk Award as editor of The Angolite, the Louisiana State Penitentiary's prisoner-produced newsmagazine.
- Guy Sockrider (1921–2011), businessman and state senator from Jennings and Lake Charles from 1948 to 1964
- Victor T. "Vic" Stelly (1941–2020), former Republican state representative from Calcasieu Parish and author of the Stelly Plan
- Martin Waldron (1925–1981), winner of the 1964 Pulitzer Prize for reporting on unchecked spending on the Florida Turnpike.

== Politics ==
After having been part of the Solid South, Calcasieu Parish voted for Republicans in 1956, 1972, and 1984, while supporting George Wallace in his American Independent Party bid in 1968. Since 2000, in tandem with much of Louisiana, the parish has trended towards the Republican Party.

United States presidential election results for Calcasieu Parish, Louisiana
Year	Republican		Democratic		Third party(ies)	
Year	No.	%	No.	%	No.	%
1912	171	5.27%	2,144	66.05%	931	28.68%
1916	165	8.36%	1,798	91.13%	10	0.51%
1920	483	16.23%	2,480	83.33%	13	0.44%
1924	1,129	30.88%	2,494	68.22%	33	0.90%
1928	1,997	36.10%	3,532	63.85%	3	0.05%
1932	678	9.96%	6,105	89.71%	22	0.32%
1936	1,037	14.19%	6,259	85.63%	13	0.18%
1940	1,425	16.91%	6,993	82.96%	11	0.13%
1944	1,867	19.19%	7,861	80.81%	0	0.00%
1948	1,940	15.60%	7,074	56.87%	3,424	27.53%
1952	11,102	41.25%	15,814	58.75%	0	0.00%
1956	13,760	51.47%	12,255	45.84%	718	2.69%
1960	10,243	27.22%	24,233	64.40%	3,151	8.37%
1964	17,046	42.27%	23,285	57.73%	0	0.00%
1968	9,520	21.46%	14,593	32.89%	20,250	45.65%
1972	24,778	57.72%	15,330	35.71%	2,817	6.56%
1976	17,485	33.24%	33,980	64.61%	1,130	2.15%
1980	27,600	42.55%	35,446	54.65%	1,813	2.80%
1984	35,566	51.39%	33,214	47.99%	430	0.62%
1988	29,649	46.25%	33,932	52.94%	519	0.81%
1992	24,847	35.57%	33,570	48.05%	11,445	16.38%
1996	26,494	35.97%	38,238	51.91%	8,929	12.12%
2000	38,086	51.72%	33,919	46.06%	1,631	2.21%
2004	46,075	57.81%	32,864	41.24%	759	0.95%
2008	50,449	61.43%	30,244	36.82%	1,438	1.75%
2012	51,850	63.44%	28,359	34.70%	1,517	1.86%
2016	54,191	64.68%	26,296	31.39%	3,298	3.94%
2020	55,066	66.62%	25,982	31.43%	1,615	1.95%
2024	56,064	69.04%	23,918	29.46%	1,219	1.50%

== See also ==
- History of Lake Charles, Louisiana
- National Register of Historic Places listings in Calcasieu Parish, Louisiana
