= Mike Danahay =

American politician

Member of the Louisiana House of Representatives from the 33rd district
- In office 2008–2018
- Preceded by: Ronnie Johns
- Succeeded by: Stuart Moss

Mayor of Sulphur, Louisiana
- Incumbent
- Assumed office May 15, 2018
- Preceded by: Chris Duncan

Personal details
- Born: Michael Edward Danahay
- Party: Democratic
- Education: McNeese State University

Michael Edward Danahay is an American politician. He served as a Democratic member for the 33rd district of the Louisiana House of Representatives.

Danahay attended McNeese State University, where he earned a Bachelor of Business Administration degree. In 2008 he was elected for the 33rd district of the Louisiana House of Representatives. Danahay succeeded Ronnie Johns. He left office on May 15, 2018, on being elected as mayor of Sulphur, Louisiana.
