= Holly Beach, Louisiana =

- Unincorporated community
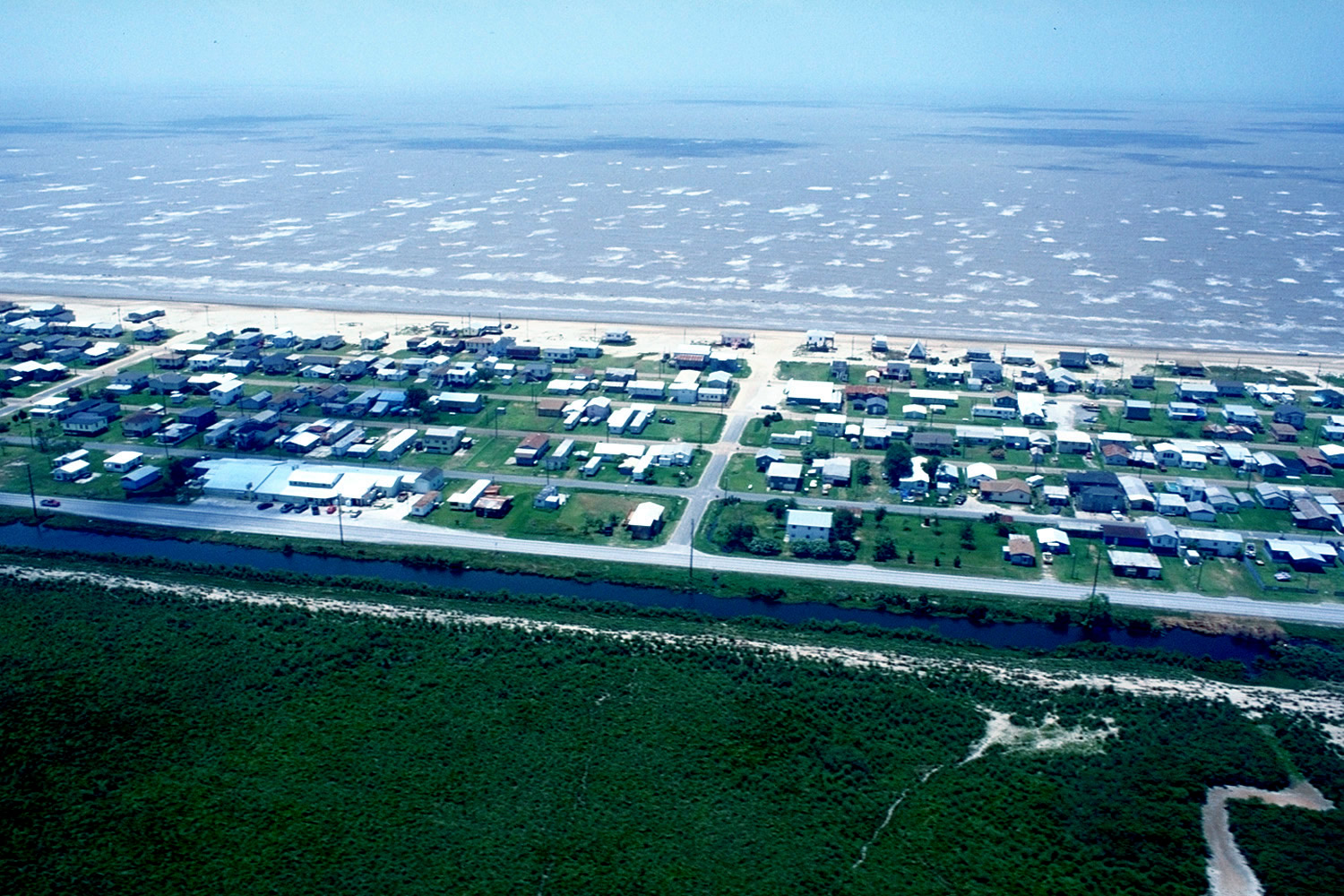
- Holly Beach in 1998
- Nickname: Cajun Riviera
- Location of Holly Beach in Louisiana
- Coordinates: 29°46′15″N 93°27′34″W
- Country: United States
- State: Louisiana
- Parish: Cameron
- Elevation: 7 ft (2.1 m)
- Time zone: UTC-6 (CST)
  - Summer (DST): UTC-5 (CDT)
- Area code: 337
- GNIS feature ID: 543303

Holly Beach (French: Plaïe-de-Houx), also known as the "Cajun Riviera" (French: La Rivière Cadienne), is a coastal unincorporated community in Cameron Parish, Louisiana, United States. Known for crabbing and a drive on the beach, this small Southwest Louisiana community mainly consisted of beach-front cabins called "camps" which, due to the threat of hurricanes, were "built-to-be-rebuilt" by its residents. It is part of the Lake Charles metropolitan area.

== History ==
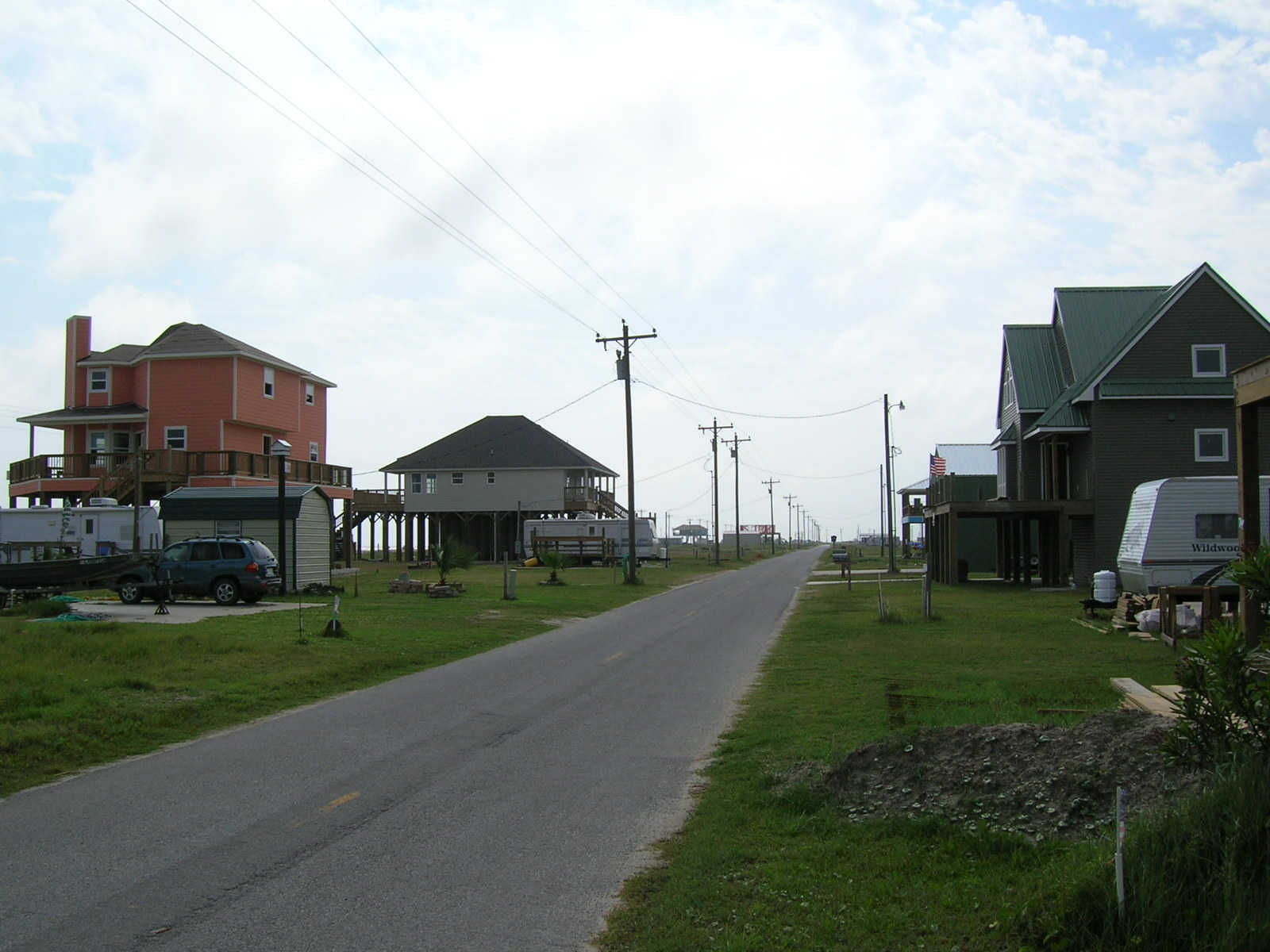
Holly Beach in May 2007, being re-populated, despite the lack of city sewer service

Holly Beach started appearing on official DOTD maps in 1948.

In September 2005 Hurricane Rita destroyed and made landfall in Cameron Parish. As a result Holly beach had storm surge between 10-15 ft. storm surge devastating the city. This was the second time Holly Beach was devastated by a hurricane; in 1957 Hurricane Audrey smashed ashore with a 12 foot storm surge. As a result several houses were modified so they were taller.

As of 2006 residents were required to sign a waiver which allows them to dwell there, despite the lack of a functioning sewer system which is a concern to the state’s department of health. It became common to see portable toilets on the community’s road sides. For new structures in Cameron Parish, the new building codes apply. In nearby Cameron, according to the parish officials, the coastal buildings built before the late 1980s that had less than fifty percent damage may retain the same pre-Rita elevation.

It was feared that these strict building codes, along with the high insurance costs, would keep many of the original locals from returning and rebuilding, and that the southern part of the parish would end up with temporary trailer type housing indefinitely. Within Holly Beach, there are several permanent structures being built, with pier elevations complying with building codes.

In September 2008, Hurricane Gustav and Hurricane Ike reflooded the area.

Hurricane Laura passed through Holly Beach in 2020.

== Geography ==
Holly Beach is located 10 miles west of Cameron and 12 miles east of Johnson Bayou.

=== Climate ===
Holly Beach has a humid subtropical climate.

Climate data for Holly Beach, Louisiana
Month	Jan	Feb	Mar	Apr	May	Jun	Jul	Aug	Sep	Oct	Nov	Dec	Year
Mean daily maximum °F (°C)	60 (16)	64 (18)	70 (21)	77 (25)	83 (28)	89 (32)	91 (33)	91 (33)	88 (31)	80 (27)	71 (22)	63 (17)	77.25 (25.14)
Mean daily minimum °F (°C)	44 (7)	47 (8)	54 (12)	61 (16)	70 (21)	75 (24)	77 (25)	76 (24)	72 (22)	63 (17)	54 (12)	46 (8)	61.58 (16.43)
Source: Accuweather

== Culture ==
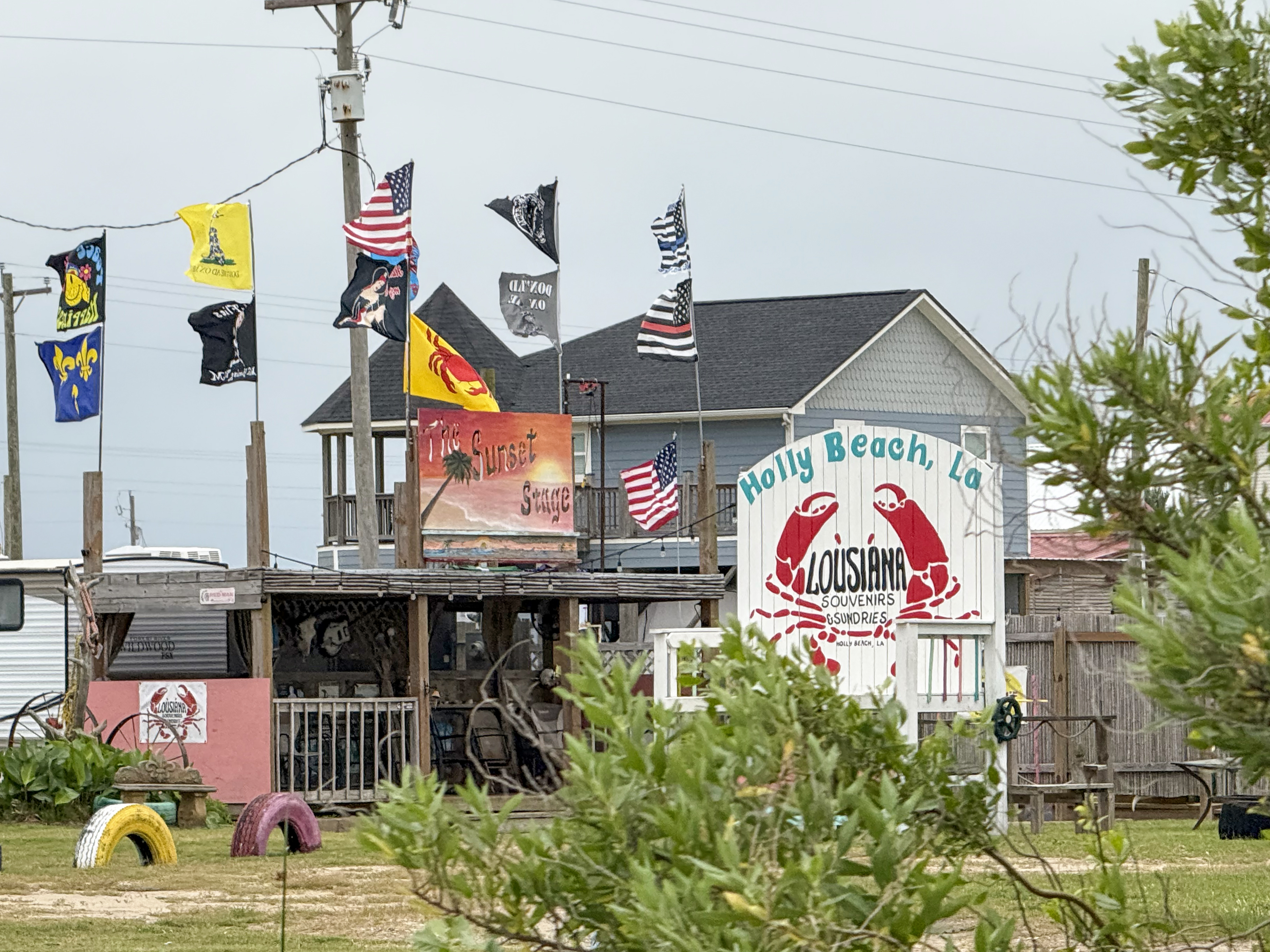
Welcome sign

In 1991, the town was the subject of the swamp pop song "(Holly Beach) Under the Boardwalk" by Kenny Tibbs (Kenny Thibodeaux) and The Jokers, released on Jin Records. In a parody of the 1960s hit "Under the Boardwalk" by The Drifters, the lyrics explain that cajun vacationers "ain't got no boardwalk, just got seaweed, but we always pass a real good time at Holly Beach."

The cultural importance of Holly Beach—at one time a social and musical hub for vacationing Cajuns—is documented in at least two classic Cajun French songs, "La Valse de Holly Beach" ("The Holly Beach Waltz") by Nathan Abshire, and "Laisse les Bons Temps Rouler" ("Let the Good Times Roll") by Lawrence Walker. The latter song includes the lyric, "Je t'ai trouvé dans les grandes meches / Et j't'ai ramené à Holly Beach / Les maringouins sont après manger / Mais laisse les bons temps rouler" ("I found you in the big marshes / And I brought you to Holly Beach / The mosquitoes are biting / But let the good times roll").
