= Sulphur, Louisiana =

- City
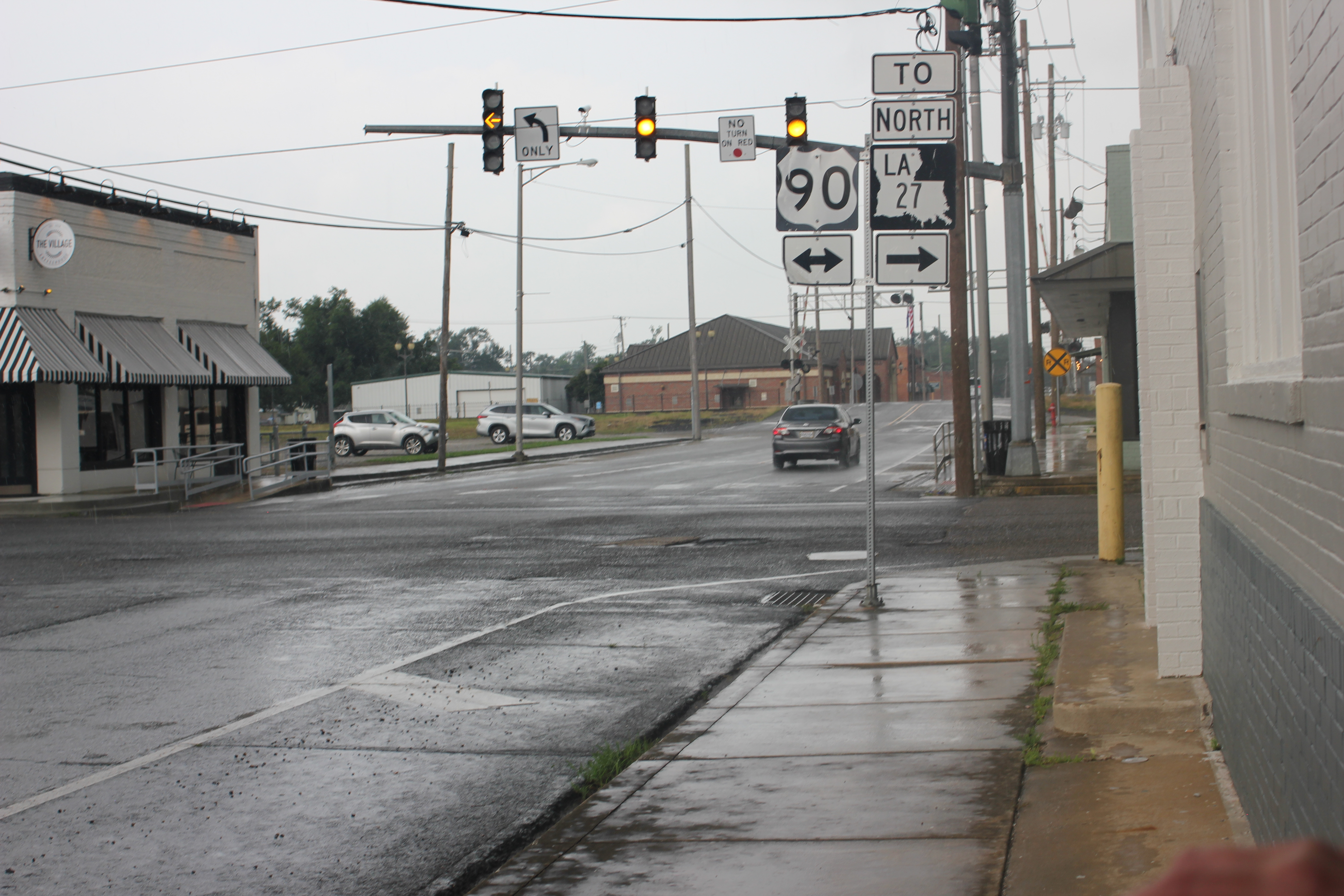
- Motto: Faith - Family - Community
- Location of Sulphur in Calcasieu Parish, Louisiana.

- Location of Louisiana in the United States Sulphur, Louisiana (the United States)
- Coordinates: 30°14′32″N 93°22′33″W
- Country: United States
- State: Louisiana
- Parish: Calcasieu

Government
  - Mayor: Mike Danahay (D) (first elected 2010)

Area
  - Total: 11.24 sq mi (29.10 km^{2})
  - Land: 11.22 sq mi (29.06 km^{2})
  - Water: 0.015 sq mi (0.04 km^{2})
- Elevation: 13 ft (4.0 m)

Population (2020)
  - Total: 21,809
  - Density: 1,943.6/sq mi (750.42/km^{2})
- Time zone: UTC−6 (CST)
  - Summer (DST): UTC−5 (CDT)
- ZIP codes: 70663, 70665
- Area code: 337
- FIPS code: 22-73640
- GNIS feature ID: 2405540
- Website: www.sulphurla.gov

Sulphur is a city in Calcasieu Parish, Louisiana, United States. The population was 21,809 in 2020. Sulphur is part of the Lake Charles metropolitan statistical area.

== History ==
Sulphur is named for the sulfur mines that were operated in the area in the 1900s. In 1867, Professor Eugene W. Hilgard, an experienced geologist who was prospecting for oil and other minerals, conducted exploratory borings in Calcasieu Parish, Louisiana and discovered sulfur in the caprock of a salt dome. However, the sulfur was beneath several hundred feet of muck and quicksand containing deadly hydrogen sulfide gas, which made mining extremely hazardous. Repeated unsuccessful attempts to sink conventional mining shafts in the 1870s and 1880s resulted in the loss of many lives.

In 1890, the German immigrant Herman Frasch invented and patented the Frasch Process of mining sulfur, using concentric pipes to pump superheated water into the ground, liquefy the mineral, and force the liquid to the surface with compressed air. The first molten sulfur was brought to the surface on Christmas Eve of 1894. Sulfur soon began to be mined on an industrial scale, with the molten mineral allowed to solidify and dry in enormous vats 100 by 400 feet, then blasted and hauled by rail to the Sabine River for shipment. Frasch's invention greatly facilitated sulfur mining, and the Union Sulphur Company, a joint venture of Dr. Frasch and the American Sulphur Company that owned the land, sparked a period of booming growth in the decades that followed, leading to its incorporation in 1914. The elementary school on South Huntington Street in downtown Sulphur is named after Frasch.

With the addition of the Cities Service (Citgo) oil refinery in 1943, the areas of Maplewood and Hollywood were developed to house refinery workers. The Sulphur area is still mostly dependent on the oil refineries and petrochemical plants for employment.

== Geography ==
Sulphur is located near the center of Calcasieu Parish. The city lies on Interstate 10 between the towns of Vinton and Westlake, approximately 20 miles (32 km) east of the Texas border. The city of Lake Charles is 9 miles (14 km) to the east. U.S. Route 90 passes through the center of Sulphur as Napoleon Street. Access from I-10 is via exits 20, 21, and 23. According to the United States Census Bureau, the city has a total area of 10.0 square miles (25.9 km^{2}), all land.

Communities inside Sulphur city limits include, from west to east, old Sulphur, Hollywood, and Maplewood, as well as Northwest Sulphur, also known as Portie Town, but usually pronounced with the Cajun form of pō-chay or Pohchay town. Outside of city limits are the communities of Carlyss and Choupique (Shoe-peak). Like the bowfin, that has many alternate names, the word "Choupique" has several variations of pronunciation in south Louisiana. Choupique is also pronounced shoe-pick, shoe-peg, or chew-pic. Moss Lake to the south. The community of Houston River is north of town, and Mossville is east of town, all but a memory with Sasol's purchase of over 4 square miles of land, that included with a few property exceptions, the entire community of Mossville. Most new development in the city is taking place south of town in Carlyss or around I-10.

=== Wildlife ===
The bayous near Sulphur are habitat for American alligators, which have been known to enter into the city, with some instances reported of attacks on humans and pets.

=== Climate ===
The climate for Sulphur, and climate data, closely mirrors that of the National Weather Service's Lake Charles Weather Forecast Office measured at the Lake Charles Regional Airport (KLCH).

== Demographics ==
Historical population
Census	Pop.	Note	%±
1920	1,714		—
1930	1,888		10.2%
1940	3,504		85.6%
1950	5,996		71.1%
1960	11,429		90.6%
1970	14,959		30.9%
1980	19,709		31.8%
1990	20,125		2.1%
2000	20,512		1.9%
2010	20,410		−0.5%
2020	21,809		6.9%
2025 (est.)	20,492	▼	−6.0%
U.S. Decennial Census

Sulphur city, Louisiana – Racial and ethnic composition Note: the US Census treats Hispanic/Latino as an ethnic category. This table excludes Latinos from the racial categories and assigns them to a separate category. Hispanics/Latinos may be of any race.
Race / Ethnicity (NH = Non-Hispanic)	Pop 2000	Pop 2010	Pop 2020	% 2000	% 2010	% 2020
White alone (NH)	18,956	17,895	17,078	92.41%	87.68%	78.31%
Black or African American alone (NH)	901	1,240	1,759	4.39%	6.08%	8.07%
Native American or Alaska Native alone (NH)	64	79	88	0.31%	0.39%	0.40%
Asian alone (NH)	76	151	263	0.37%	0.74%	1.21%
Native Hawaiian or Pacific Islander alone (NH)	8	14	6	0.04%	0.07%	0.03%
Other race alone (NH)	12	24	38	0.06%	0.12%	0.17%
Mixed race or Multiracial (NH)	190	316	958	0.93%	1.55%	4.39%
Hispanic or Latino (any race)	305	691	1,619	1.49%	3.39%	7.42%
Total	20,512	20,410	21,809	100.00%	100.00%	100.00%

As of the 2020 United States census, there were 21,809 people, 8,033 households, and 4,981 families residing in the city.

== Economy ==
=== Tourism ===
Tourist attractions as well as local destinations in Sulphur include:

- Brimstone Museum: A former Southern Pacific Railway depot built in 1915 to facilitate the moving of passengers and freight for the Sulfur mines. The depot was discontinued in the early 1970s and in 1975 was sold to the Sulphur Association of Commerce, on condition that it be moved for safety reasons, and was moved to a location near Frasch Park and renovated. Building restoration was completed and the dedication ceremony took place on the nation's 200th birthday, July 4, 1976. The museum highlights includes a permanent exhibit on the history of Sulphur, and is also the only museum in the United States to exhibit historical information on the Frasch mining process. The building was moved a second time, to 900 S. Huntington street, providing more visibility resulting in an increase in visitors, and on December 5, 2005, was transferred to the Brimstone Historical Society. Aside from the permanent exhibits the museum provides exhibits of local interest including art and other historical artifacts from the history of the city.
- Henning Cultural Center: Was built in 1904 and in 2002, was acquired by Sulphur Parks and Recreation, and opened in Heritage Square community area.
- The Creole Nature Trail starts in Sulphur and the Creole Nature Trail Adventure Point provides information on nature and wildlife Areas, hiking trails, outdoor activities, and nature & parks along the route.

== Arts and culture ==
In 2014 Sulphur was named the third best city in Louisiana to raise a family.

== Recreation ==
Sulphur Parks and Recreation (SPAR) includes Frasch Park and Golf Course, North Frasch Park, the SPAR Water Park, The Grove at Heritage Square, Kyle Park, Pattison Park, McMurry Park, Center Circle Park, and Carlyss Park,

== Education ==
Most of Sulphur's schools are under the Calcasieu Parish School Board. One high school, Sulphur High School, serves the city, along with the Sulphur High Ninth Grade Campus that was completed in 2004. Elementary schools include Frasch, E.K. Key, W.T. Henning, R.W. Vincent, Maplewood, and Vincent Settlement (Carlyss). D.S. Perkins Elementary, one of the area's most challenged schools, closed in 2010, and all students and teachers were transferred to Cypress Cove, a completely new facility located in Carlyss. This represented a move from one of the more impoverished areas of old Sulphur (North Sulphur, a.k.a. "Portie Town" [Portie is pronounced pō-chay]) to one of the wealthier, emerging communities south of town. Middle schools include Leblanc Middle School, the W.W. Lewis Middle School, and Maplewood (K-8th grade). There are some private schools in the area as well, including Our Lady's Catholic School on Cypress Street.

Frasch Elementary, W.W. Lewis Middle, and Sulphur High School offer Spanish Immersion classes in which students take Spanish language as well as core classes totally in Spanish from kindergarten all the way to eighth grade, and Spanish language classes up to Spanish V or VI in High School. The program has been praised for giving children a fluency in the Spanish language as well as an understanding of other cultures at an early age. Most of the Immersion teachers come from Hispanic countries or are of Hispanic descent.

== Notable people ==
- Marcus R. Clark, justice of the Louisiana Supreme Court, born in Sulphur in 1956
- Casey Daigle, former pitcher in MLB. He graduated from Sulphur High School.
- Mike Danahay, Louisiana state representative for Calcasieu Parish
- Les Farnum, member of the Louisiana House of Representatives
- Herman Frasch, inventor of the "Frasch Method" of mining sulfur, was head of Union Sulphur Company.
- Aaron Jeansonne (born 1998), racing driver
- Edith Killgore Kirkpatrick, member of Louisiana Board of Regents from 1978 to 1990.
- Janice Lynde, actress, original cast member of the CBS soap opera The Young and the Restless
- Dak Prescott, NFL quarterback, professional football player with the Dallas Cowboys
- Matt Stevens, former football player: Kansas City Chiefs quarterback
- David Walker (born 1955), former Sulphur High School and Texas A&M University quarterback.
