= Flavin =

Flavin may refer to:

== Science ==
- Flavin adenine dinucleotide (FAD), a redox cofactor
- Flavin-containing amine oxidoreductase, a family of amine oxidases
- Flavin-containing monooxygenase (FMO), a protein family
- Flavin containing monooxygenase 1, a human gene
- Flavin containing monooxygenase 3, a human gene
- Flavin group, a group of organic compounds
- Flavin mononucleotide, a biomolecule produced from riboflavin
- Flavin reductase, an enzyme

== Places ==
- Flavin, Aveyron, a commune in southern France

== People ==
- Adrian Flavin (born 1979), a professional rugby player
- Christopher Flavin, president of the Worldwatch Institute
- Dan Flavin (1933–1996), a minimalist artist famous for using fluorescent light fixtures
- Dan Flavin (politician), Louisiana politician
- Dick Flavin (Gaelic footballer) (born 1978), Irish Gaelic football player
- Dick Flavin (poet) (1936–2022), American poet
- James Flavin (1906–1976), an American character actor
- Jennifer Flavin (born 1968), a former model and wife of actor Sylvester Stallone
- Martin Flavin (1883–1967), an American playwright and novelist
- Martin Flavin (politician) (1841–1917), Irish Nationalist politician, Member of Parliament (MP) for Cork, 1891–1892
- Michael Joseph Flavin (1866-1944), Irish Nationalist politician, Member of Parliament (MP) for North Kerry, 1896-1918
- Mick Flavin, an Irish country singer
