= Alfons Penzkofer =

German physicist

- Born: October 19, 1942 (age 84); Allersdorf, Kollnburg, Germany
- Citizenship: German
- Education: Technical University of Munich; Oskar von Miller Polytechnikum
- Known for: Ultrafast laser physics, nonlinear optics, optogenetics spectroscopy
- Awards: Fellow of Optica (1998)
- Scientific career
- Fields: Ultrafast laser physics, Nonlinear optics, Optical spectroscopy, Photobiology
- Workplaces: University of Regensburg; Technical University of Munich
- Doctoral advisor: Wolfgang Kaiser (physicist)

Alfons Penzkofer (born 19 October 1942) is a German physicist and retired professor of physics at the University of Regensburg. He is known for his contributions to ultrafast laser physics, nonlinear optics, time-resolved optical spectroscopy, and the spectroscopic characterization of organic dyes, luminescent polymers, and photoreceptor proteins relevant to optogenetics. He is a Fellow of Optica (formerly the Optical Society of America).

== Early life and education ==
Penzkofer was born in Allersdorf, Kollnburg, Germany. After elementary school and vocational training in agriculture and papermaking, he attended the Oskar von Miller Polytechnikum in Munich, where he earned an engineering degree in papermaking (Ing. grad.) in 1965. He passed the examination for the general university entrance qualification administered by the Bavarian State Ministry of Education and Cultural Affairs in 1966. He then studied physics at the Technical University of Munich, receiving his Diploma degree (Dipl.-Phys.) in 1971.

From 1971 to 1974, he pursued doctoral research under Wolfgang Kaiser (physicist) at the Technical University of Munich, working on parametric four-photon interactions in liquids and solids with picosecond light pulses. He was awarded a Dr. rer. nat. in 1974. He completed his habilitation in 1977 with a treatise on high-intensity Raman interactions, earning the Dr. rer. nat. habil. degree.

== Academic career ==
From 1971 to 1976, Penzkofer was a scientific assistant to Wolfgang Kaiser at the Technical University of Munich. He moved to the University of Regensburg in 1976 as a scientific assistant to Max Maier. In 1978, he became a professor of physics at the University of Regensburg, a position he held until his retirement in 2008. Since 2008, he has continued research at the University of Regensburg, focusing on photobiological spectroscopy and the characterization of flavin- and retinal-based photoreceptors used in optogenetics.

== Research contributions ==
In the early 1970s, Penzkofer contributed to the generation of picosecond and subpicosecond light pulses with a neodymium glass laser using saturable absorbers. He later developed femtosecond pulse generation in a linear colliding-pulse mode-locking dye laser and a Kerr-lens mode-locked titanium-sapphire laser. He also worked on picosecond and femtosecond light continua generation, including their theoretical parametric four-photon interaction description and spectroscopic applications.

He performed extensive spectroscopic measurements on gain media for solid-state dye lasers, including determination of stimulated emission cross-sections and excited-state absorption cross-sections. He extended this work to luminescent polymers, investigating traveling-wave lasing, distributed feedback lasing, and leaky-mode emission from thin films. His studies included photodegradation, excitation energy transfer, and exciton–exciton annihilation.

Penzkofer developed methods for measuring third-order nonlinear susceptibilities, two-photon absorption cross-section spectra, nonlinear refractive indices, and optical constants of absorbing media. He also contributed to Rayleigh scattering and Mie scattering techniques, refractive index dispersion measurements, and optical rotatory dispersion.

He characterized the absorption, emission, and energy transfer properties of phosphorescent molecules such as Ir(ppy)₃ (tris(2-phenylpyridine) iridium) and PtOEP (platinum octaethylporphyrin) in neat films and host matrices, contributing to the understanding of OLED materials.

In later years, Penzkofer studied the photocycle dynamics of flavin-based blue-light photoreceptors, including LOV domains (phototropism), cryptochromes (circadian rhythm), and BLUF domains (phototaxis). He clarified electron-transfer and protein-rearrangement mechanisms. He also investigated retinal-based photoreceptors, including rhodopsin domains (histidine kinase rhodopsin, rhodopsin guanylyl cyclase) and fluorescent voltage sensors such as QuasAr1 and Archon2. His work has been applied to optogenetic toolkits for cell biology and neuroscience.

== Editorial work and memberships ==
Penzkofer served on the editorial board of Optical and Quantum Electronics from approximately 1980 to 2019 and as a regional editor for that journal.

== Awards and recognition ==
- Fellow of Optica (formerly Optical Society of America), elected 1998.
- International Research Excellence Award 2026 from the Award Committee Panel of Academic Excellence Awards.

== Selected publications ==
- Penzkofer, A.; Laubereau, A.; Kaiser, W. (1979). "High Intensity Raman Interactions". Progress in Quantum Electronics. 6 (2): 55–140. doi:10.1016/0079-6727(79)90011-9.
- Penzkofer, A. (1988). "Solid State Lasers". Progress in Quantum Electronics. 12 (4): 291–427. doi:10.1016/0079-6727(88)90007-9.
- Holzer, W.; Penzkofer, A.; Pertsch, T.; et al. (2002). "Corrugated neat thin-film conjugated polymer distributed-feedback lasers". Applied Physics B. 74 (4–5): 333–342. doi:10.1007/s003400200821.
- Holzer, W.; Penzkofer, A.; et al. (2004). "Spectroscopic and travelling-wave lasing characterization of Gilch-type and Horner-type MEH-PPV". Synthetic Metals. 140 (2–3): 155–170. doi:10.1016/S0379-6779(03)00356-4.
- Penzkofer, A.; Kateriya, S.; Hegemann, P. (2016). "Photodynamics of the optogenetic BLUF coupled photoactivated adenylyl cyclases (PACs)". Dyes and Pigments. 135: 102–112. doi:10.1016/j.dyepig.2016.05.037.
- Penzkofer, A.; Hegemann, P.; Kateriya, S. (2024). "Organic dyes in optogenetics". In Duarte, F.J. (ed.). Organic Lasers and Organic Photonics (2nd ed.). Bristol: IOP Publishing. pp. 13-1 – 13-198.
- Penzkofer, A. (2026). "Voltage sensitive probes for membrane potential determination in life science". NEXRES. 7: 101497.
