= Penzkofer =

Penzkofer is a German surname. Notable people with the surname include:

- Alfons Penzkofer (born 1942), German physicist
- Arnoldo Penzkofer (1959–2008), Paraguayan basketball player
