= Alkanesulfonate monooxygenase =

alkanesulfonate monooxygenase

Identifiers
- EC no.: 1.14.14.5
- CAS no.: 256383-67-2

Databases
- IntEnz: IntEnz view
- BRENDA: BRENDA entry
- ExPASy: NiceZyme view
- KEGG: KEGG entry
- MetaCyc: metabolic pathway
- PRIAM: profile
- PDB structures: RCSB PDB PDBe PDBsum
- Gene Ontology: AmiGO / QuickGO
Search
- PMC: articles
- PubMed: articles
- NCBI: proteins

In enzymology, an alkanesulfonate monooxygenase (EC 1.14.14.5) is an enzyme that catalyzes the chemical reaction

an alkanesulfonate (R-CH_{2}-SO_{3}H) + FMNH_{2} + O_{2} $\rightleftharpoons$ an aldehyde (R-CHO) + FMN + sulfite + H_{2}O

The 3 substrates of this enzyme are alkanesulfonate (R-CH_{2}-SO_{3}H), FMNH_{2}, and O_{2}, whereas its 4 products are aldehyde, FMN, sulfite, and H_{2}O.

This enzyme belongs to the family of oxidoreductases, specifically those acting on paired donors, with O_{2} as oxidant and incorporation or reduction of oxygen. The oxygen incorporated need not be derived from O_{2} with reduced flavin or flavoprotein as one donor, and incorporation of one atom of oxygen into the other donor. The systematic name of this enzyme class is alkanesulfonate, reduced-FMN:oxygen oxidoreductase. Other names in common use include SsuD, and sulfate starvation-induced protein 6.
