= Richard Kuhn =

Austrian-German biochemist (1900–1967)

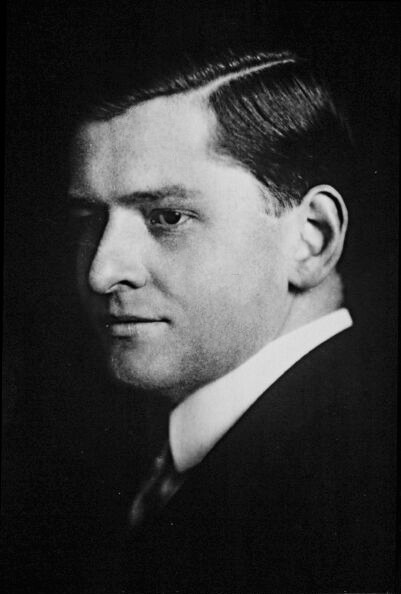
- Born: Richard Johann Kuhn; 3 December 1900; Vienna, Austria-Hungary
- Died: 31 July 1967 (aged 66); Heidelberg, West Germany
- Education: University of Vienna; LMU Munich
- Known for: Study of carotenoids and vitamins; Isoalloxazine; Total synthesis of riboflavin and Vitamin B6; Soman; Kuhn–Winterstein reaction
- Awards: Nobel Prize in Chemistry (1938); Goethe Prize (1942); Wilhelm Exner Medal (1952); Paul Ehrlich and Ludwig Darmstaedter Prize (1958); Centenary Prize (1962)
- Scientific career
- Fields: Chemistry
- Workplaces: University of Heidelberg

Richard Johann Kuhn (German pronunciation: [ˈʁɪçaʁt ˈkuːn]; 3 December 1900 – 31 July 1967) was an Austrian-German biochemist who was awarded the Nobel Prize in Chemistry in 1938 "for his work on carotenoids and vitamins".

== Early life and education ==
Kuhn was born on 3 December 1900 in Vienna, Austria, where he attended grammar school and high school. His interest in chemistry surfaced early; however he had many interests and decided late to study chemistry. Between 1910 and 1918 he was a schoolmate of Wolfgang Pauli, who was awarded the Nobel Prize in Physics for 1945.

Beginning in 1918, Kuhn attended lectures at the University of Vienna in chemistry. He finished his chemistry studies at the Ludwig-Maximilians-Universität München (LMU Munich) and received his doctoral degree in 1922 with Richard Willstätter for a scientific work on enzyme specificity.

== Career ==
After graduating, Kuhn continued his scientific career, first in Munich from 1925, then at the ETH Zurich 1926–1929, and from 1929 onwards at the University of Heidelberg, where he was head of the chemistry department beginning in 1937.

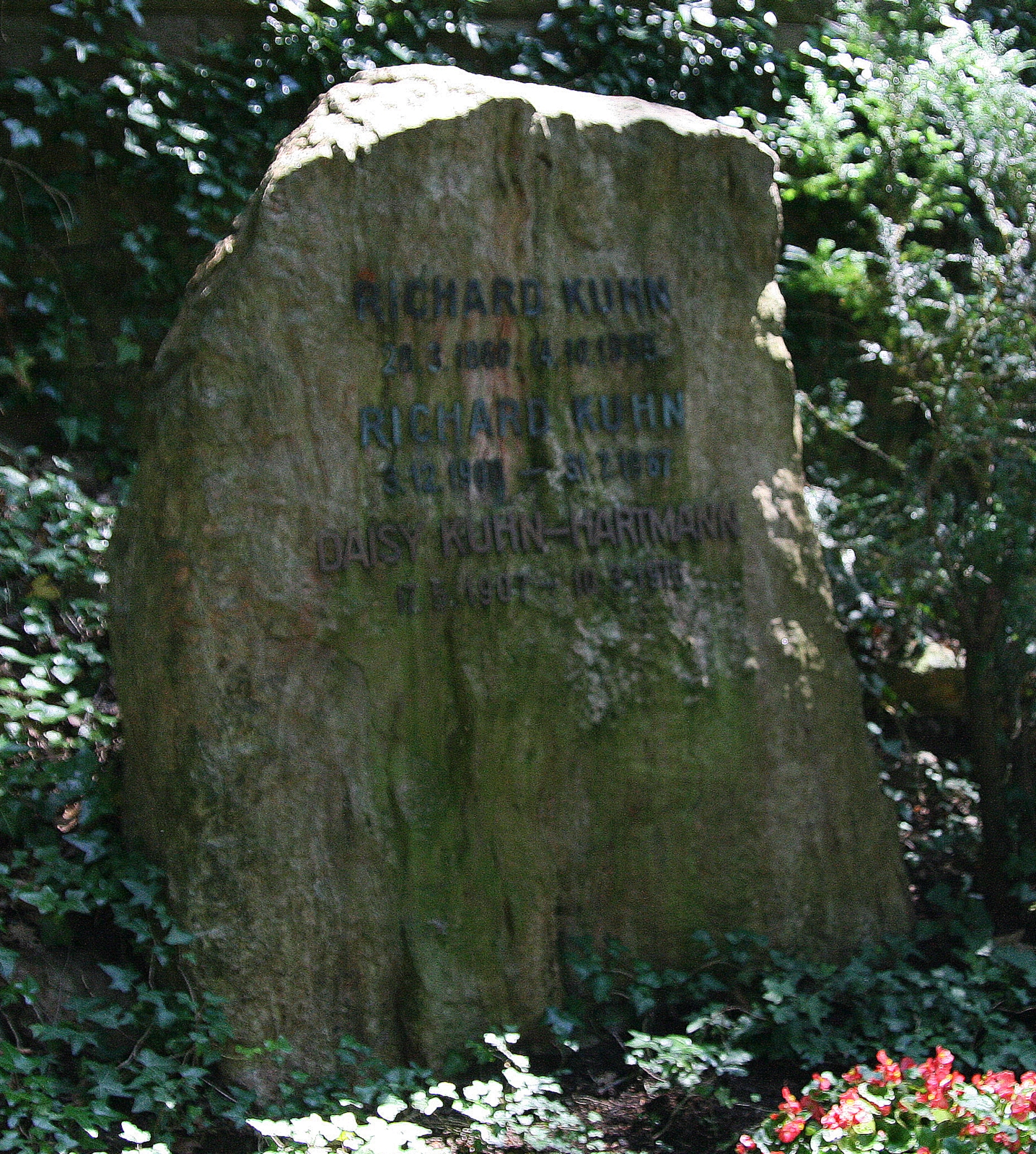
Kuhn's grave in Heidelberg

Kuhn's areas of study included: investigations of theoretical problems of organic chemistry (stereochemistry of aliphatic and aromatic compounds; syntheses of polyenes and cumulenes; constitution and colour; the acidity of hydrocarbons), as well as extensive fields in biochemistry (carotenoids; flavins; vitamins and enzymes). Specifically, he carried out important work on vitamin B_{2} and the antidermatitis vitamin B_{6}.

In 1929 he became Principal of the Institute for Chemistry at the newly founded Kaiser Wilhelm Institute for Medical Research (which, since 1950, has been renamed the Max Planck Institute for Medical Research in Heidelberg). By 1937 he also took over the administration of this Institute.

In addition to these duties he also served as of Professor of Biochemistry at the University of Heidelberg, and for one year he was at the University of Pennsylvania, Philadelphia, as a Visiting Research Professor for Physiological Chemistry.

He was subsequently awarded the Nobel Prize in Chemistry in 1938 for his "work on carotenoids and vitamins," but rejected the prize as Hitler had forbidden German citizens to accept it. In a handwritten letter, he even described the awarding of the prize to a German as an invitation to violate a decree of the Führer. He received the award after World War II.

Kuhn is credited with the discovery of the deadly nerve agent Soman in 1944.

He was editor of Justus Liebigs Annalen der Chemie from 1948.

== Personal life and death ==
In 1928, Kuhn married Daisy Hartmann. The couple had two sons and four daughters.

Kuhn died on 31 July 1967 in Heidelberg, Germany, aged 66.

== Nazi era legacy ==
Kuhn collaborated with high-ranking Nazi officials and denounced three of his Jewish co-workers in 1936.

In 2005, the Society of German Chemists (Gesellschaft Deutscher Chemiker, GDCh) declared their intention to no longer award the Richard Kuhn Medal: "The board of the GDCh intends to discontinue awarding the Medal named after the organic chemist, Nobel Prize laureate of the year 1938 and President of the GDCh in 1964–65, Richard Kuhn. The board thereby draws the consequences out of research on Richard Kuhn's behaviour during National Socialism. Even though the question of whether Kuhn was a convinced National Socialist or just a career-oriented camp follower is not fully answered, he undisputably supported the Nazi-regime in administrative and organizational ways, especially by his scientific work. Despite his scientific achievements, Kuhn is not suitable to serve as a role model, and eponym for an important award, mainly due to his unreflected research on poison gas, but also due to his conduct towards Jewish colleagues."

== Honours and awards ==
- 1938: Nobel Prize in Chemistry
- 1952: Wilhelm Exner Medal
- 1960: Honorary doctorate from the University of Vienna
- 1961: Austrian Decoration for Science and Art
