= Ferric-chelate reductase (NADPH) =

Identifiers
- EC no.: 1.16.1.9
- CAS no.: 120720-17-4

Databases
- IntEnz: IntEnz view
- BRENDA: BRENDA entry
- ExPASy: NiceZyme view
- KEGG: KEGG entry
- MetaCyc: metabolic pathway
- PRIAM: profile
- PDB structures: RCSB PDB PDBe PDBsum
Search
- PMC: articles
- PubMed: articles
- NCBI: proteins

Ferric-chelate reductase (NADPH) (EC 1.16.1.9, ferric chelate reductase, iron chelate reductase, NADPH:Fe^{3+}-EDTA reductase, NADPH-dependent ferric reductase, yqjH (gene)) is an enzyme with systematic name Fe(II):NADP^{+} oxidoreductase. This enzyme catalyses the following chemical reaction

2 Fe(II) + 2 apo-siderophore + NADP^{+} + H^{+} $\rightleftharpoons$ 2 Fe(III)-siderophore + NADPH

Ferric-chelate reductase contains FAD.

== See also ==
- Ferric-chelate reductase
