= FAD diphosphatase =

Class of enzymes

Identifiers
- EC no.: 3.6.1.18
- CAS no.: 37289-30-8

Databases
- BRENDA: enzyme data
- ExPASy: NiceZyme view
- KEGG: enzyme entry
- MetaCyc: metabolic pathway
- Rhea: reactions
- PDB structures: RCSB PDB PDBe PDBsum
- Gene Ontology: AmiGO / QuickGO
Search
- PMC: articles
- PubMed: articles
- NCBI: proteins

FAD diphosphatase (EC 3.6.1.18) is an enzyme characterised from mung bean and rat liver that catalyzes the hydrolysis of flavin adenine dinucleotide to flavin mononucleotide and adenosine monophosphate:

flavin adenine dinucleotide
H_{2}O
flavin mononucleotide
+
adenosine monophosphate

In humans, the enzyme is involved in the recycling of flavin cofactors.

This enzyme is a hydrolase, specifically one acting on acid anhydrides in phosphorus-containing anhydrides. The systematic name of this enzyme class is FAD nucleotidohydrolase. Other names in common use include FAD pyrophosphatase, riboflavin adenine dinucleotide pyrophosphatase, flavin adenine dinucleotide pyrophosphatase, riboflavine adenine dinucleotide pyrophosphatase, and flavine adenine dinucleotide pyrophosphatase.
