= Ferric-chelate reductase =

ferric-chelate reductase

Identifiers
- EC no.: 1.16.1.7
- CAS no.: 122097-10-3

Databases
- BRENDA: enzyme data
- ExPASy: NiceZyme view
- KEGG: enzyme entry
- MetaCyc: metabolic pathway
- Rhea: reactions
- PDB structures: RCSB PDB PDBe PDBsum
- Gene Ontology: AmiGO / QuickGO
Search
- PMC: articles
- PubMed: articles
- NCBI: proteins

In enzymology, a ferric-chelate reductase (EC 1.16.1.7) is an enzyme that catalyzes the chemical reaction

2 Fe(II) + NAD^{+} $\rightleftharpoons$ 2 Fe(III) + NADH + H^{+}

Thus, the two substrates of this enzyme are Fe(II) and NAD^{+}, whereas its 3 products are Fe(III), NADH, and H^{+}.

== Nomenclature ==
This enzyme belongs to the family of oxidoreductases, specifically those oxidizing metal ion with NAD^{+} or NADP^{+} as acceptor. The systematic name of this enzyme class is Fe(II):NAD^{+} oxidoreductase. Other names in common use include:

- ferric chelate reductase
- iron chelate reductase
- NADH:Fe^{3+}-EDTA reductase
- NADH_{2}:Fe^{3+} oxidoreductase

== Prokaryotes ==
Most studied ferric reductases in bacteria are either specific for a ferric iron complex or non-specific flavin ferric reductases, with the latter being more common in bacteria. Both reductase forms are suitable complimentary soluble pathways for the efficient extraction of iron via siderophores.

=== Bacterial soluble flavin reductase in E. coli ===
Non-specific bacterial flavin reductase has been well researched within E. coli, which is the NAD(P)H: flavin oxidoreductase (Fre). In E. coli, NAD(P)H is reduced to either free FAD or riboflavin, which is known to reduce ferric iron to ferrous iron intracellularly. Fre is also structurally similar to ferredoxin-NADP^{+} reductase (Fpr), and bids flavin cofactor to reduce ferredoxin and siderophore bound ferric iron. Despite these hypothesized structural commonalities, not much is known regarding this enzymatic structure overall.

=== Bacterial flavin reductase in Paracoccus denitrificans ===
Paracoccus denitrificans contains two enzymes which aid in iron reduction - ferric reductase A and B (FerA and FerB). FerA binds to oxidized flavins (FMN and FAD). Unlike the many structural unknowns surrounding Fre, the crystal structure of FerA is well defined (see Fig. 6 in Sedlácek et al., 2016). FerA consists of two protein subunits, with three alpha-helices and ten beta-sheets total.

=== Archaeal soluble flavin reductase in Archaeoglobus fulgidus ===
Archaeoglobus fulgidus has been shown to have a similar ferric reductase (FeR) to the NAD(P)H:flavin oxidoreductase family. FeR is archaea specific and reduces external, synthetic ferric iron complexes and Fe(III)-citrate with NAD(P)H and bound flavin adenine dinucleotide (FAD) or flavin mononucleotide (FMN) cofactor.

== Eukaryotes ==
=== Soluble ferric reductase in yeast ===
Ferric reductases are present in some unicellular eukaryotes, including pathogenic yeast which utilize ferric reductases during infection of a host. Contrary to archaea and bacteria, soluble ferric reductases are much more rare in fungi, with more research necessary to determine just how widespread soluble ferric reductase are amongst fungi. These soluble ferric reductases in fungi are known to operate extracellularly, as fungi are capable of excreting them to reduce iron in the environment. This mechanism of ferric reductase excretion allows the labilization of iron in the environment, and typically happens concurrently with fungal siderophore pathways and iron reduction on cellular surfaces, which occur with membrane-bound ferric reductases.

=== Membrane-bound ferric reductase in yeast ===
Membrane-bound ferric reductases are fore more common in yeast cells relative to soluble ferric reductases. These reductases utilize NAD(P)H, flavin, and heme b cofactors in order to move reducing agents across their membranes to an extracellular Fe(III) source. After this, the reduced Fe(II) may be re-oxidized and rebound to be transported across the membrane again via both Cu-dependent ferroxidase and Fe(III) transport proteins. Alternatively, ferrous, unchelated iron can be transported via low-affinity proteins, however, this mechanism is less common than the former.

=== Membrane-bound ferric reductase in Arabidopsis ===
Most plants contain ferric-chelate reductase in order to uptake iron from the environment. Arabidopsis is capable of increasing the activity of ferric-chelate reductase, which is located in the membranes of root epidermal cells, in environments with limited iron availability. Additionally, it is hypothesized that the activity of this reductase stimulates iron release from organic compounds within the soils, releasing it for biological uptake. The crystalline structure of this enzyme in Arabidopsis has not yet been well constrained, however, it is hypothesized that, due to its similar functions, its structure is likely similar to ferric-chelate reductases in both yeast and human phagocytic NADPH oxidase gp91phox.
