= Willie Mount =

American politician from Louisiana

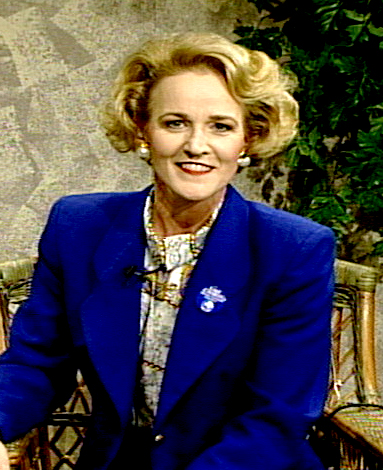
- Mount as Mayor of Lake Charles

Member of the Louisiana Senate from the 27th district
- In office January 10, 2000 – January 2012
- Preceded by: James J. Cox
- Succeeded by: Ronnie Johns

25th Mayor of Lake Charles, Louisiana
- In office July 1, 1993 – December 1999
- Preceded by: James Sudduth
- Succeeded by: Rodney Geyen (interim); Randy Roach

Personal details
- Born: Willie Landry; August 25, 1949 (age 77) Lake Charles, Louisiana
- Party: Democratic
- Spouse: Benjamin Mount
- Education: McNeese State University (BBA, 1974)
- Occupation: Businesswoman

Willie Landry Mount (born August 25, 1949) is an American politician from Louisiana who served as a Democratic member of the Louisiana State Senate from 2000 to 2012. She represented District 27, which includes parts of her native Lake Charles and the surrounding cities of Sulphur and Westlake. From 1993 to 1999, Mount was the first woman to serve as the mayor of Lake Charles.

Mount was a candidate in the 2004 U.S. House of Representatives election for Louisiana's 7th congressional district. She was defeated by Republican Charles Boustany in a contested general election campaign that received national attention.

== Personal life ==
In 1974, Mount obtained a Bachelor of Business Administration degree from McNeese State University in Lake Charles. She owned a small business and worked as a real estate agent and pharmaceutical representative for Lederle Laboratories. Mount resides in her hometown with her husband, attorney Benjamin Mount; they have no children.

== Career ==
Mount had been active in community work through organizations such as the Junior League of Lake Charles, and ran for mayor of Lake Charles in 1993. She defeated Paul Savoie, a Democrat and a former mayor. During her tenure she served as president of the Louisiana Conference of Mayors and supported restoration efforts following hurricanes. To this end Mount testified before Congress in support of the Conservation and Reinvestment Act of 1999.

She co-sponsored the building of an Amtrak station, modeled after an older station that had been destroyed in a fire. In an effort to succeed retiring state senator James J. Cox, Mount announced her Senate candidacy on October 19, 1999, while addressing the Calcasieu Parish School Board, whose support she sought. Upon being elected, Mount resigned as mayor and City Council President Rodney Geyen took over the office.

In the senate, Mount served on a variety of committees, chairing the Senate Committees on Coastal Restoration and Flood Control, Revenue and Fiscal Affairs, and also serving as vice-chair of the Senate Committee on Education. In 2008, she became chairwoman of the Senate Committee on Health and Welfare. Mount often sponsors legislation regarding health and public service. This includes bills intended to identify sex offenders and enact term limits for various boards and commissions. She was responsible for passing these term limits as an amendment to the Louisiana Constitution, as SB 232 on November 4, 2008. Mount also sponsored legislation to merge New Orleans criminal and civil district courts, create a childhood and family learning center, couple the opening of new hospice care providers with inspections of existing ones, allow police to suspend driver's licenses of teenagers with problems at school, and create a state-run internet database providing information on the quality of health care providers. Mount was responsible for legislation that made Louisiana water fluoridation mandatory, and, in her capacity as chair of the Senate Health committee, Mount in 2008 declared major Louisiana health care reform unlikely without prior federal reform.

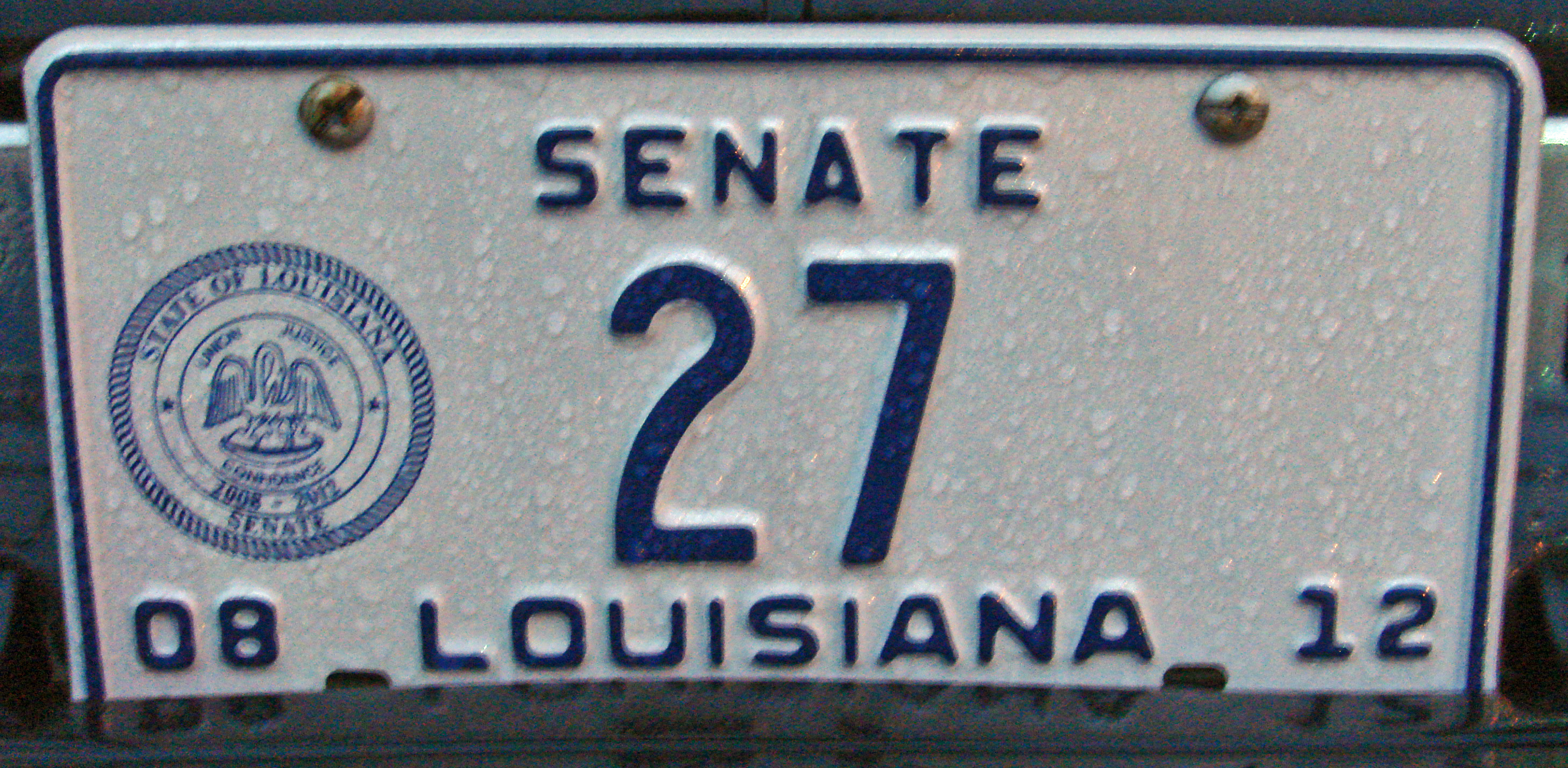
Willie Mount 2008–2012 session license plate

As senator, Mount raised funds for health care facilities (Mount had herself roasted in support of the Southwest Louisiana Center for Health Services). Mount is a member of a number of boards and charitable organisations and provides an annual compilation of "Louisiana positives" about Louisiana's standing in national ratings. Because of term limits, Mount was eligible to serve as a state senator until 2012.

== 2004 congressional race ==
Mount ran for Congress in 2004 to succeed Chris John, who instead ran for the United States Senate but lost to Republican David Vitter. She positioned herself as a Conservative Democrat who supported balanced budgets and conservative social views, emphasizing job creation, health care and her opposition to offshoring. Her major Democratic opponent in the jungle primary was African American State Senator Don Cravins Sr., the father of another lawmaker, Don Cravins Jr. of Opelousas. Her major Republican opponent was Charles Boustany, a retired heart surgeon from Lafayette, who ran on a platform of preventing tax increases and passing a new energy bill. The Louisiana Democratic Party was supporting Mount, as Cravins was believed to be a weaker contestant in a run-off. Polls taken in late October had shown Boustany, Cravins and Mount statistically tied, and the election was hotly contested.

In the first ballot on November 2, 2004, Boustany and Mount garnered the most votes; Cravins was defeated by less than two thousand votes. As both fell short of a majority, a second ballot was mandated. In the subsequent campaign, Mount criticized Boustany for favoring tax cuts for the rich and being indifferent to health care, while Boustany rejected the attacks as false and stressed his willingness to work with Democrats and Independents. Boustany in turn portrayed Mount as liberal and favoring tax increases. Mount criticized Boustany for favoring the privatization of social security, an unpopular position in Louisiana, and as distant from the interests of individual voters. She received endorsements from U.S. Senator John Breaux, who had represented the 7th district for over fourteen years, and Governor Kathleen Blanco. Boustany was helped by Vice President Dick Cheney, who campaigned on his behalf in Lake Charles. Mount, however, was not endorsed by Democratic primary opponent Don Cravins, who complained about the state Democratic Party's endorsement of Mount in a partially party funded mailer that excluded him and which he believed contributed to his narrow loss. Cravins prepared a suit in federal court claiming that the state Democratic Party violated the Voting Rights Act.

In the general election on December 4, 2004, Boustany defeated Mount, 55 percent to 45 percent in an election with low voter turnout. Democrats had hoped on a big turnout, as the district is nearly a quarter African American, a reliable Democratic constituency. Analysis of the race suggested that Mount's defeat was helped by the open primary system that had the Democratic candidates work against each other and led to Cravin's conflict with the state Democratic Party which in turn led to suppressed voter turnout. The large number of negative advertisements was also cited as a factor that contributed to low turnout. Another detriment for Mount mentioned was the strong support for George W. Bush in the presidential election against John Kerry in the district, which he carried by about 60 percent of the vote.

Following her defeat for Congress, Mount ruled out another campaign for the House seat, but she said she may later seek another statewide office. When Mount left the Senate in 2012, she was succeeded by a Democrat-turned-Republican, former State Representative Ronnie Johns of Sulphur, who ran unopposed for the open seat.

== Campaign for tax assessor ==
In 2011, Mount announced her candidacy for tax assessor of Calcasieu Parish. She received 13,477 votes (38.3 percent) in the primary held on October 22 and promptly withdrew from the November 19 general election. Victory hence went to the acting assessor, Wendy Curphy Aguillard, an Independent who led the primary balloting with 17,208 votes (48.9 percent). A third candidate, Republican Mike Regan, was also eliminated in the primary, having received the remaining 4,538 votes (12.9 percent).

== Electoral history ==
Mayor, City of Lake Charles, 1993

Threshold > 50%

First Ballot, April 3, 1993

| Candidate | Affiliation | Support | Outcome |
|---|---|---|---|
| Willie Landry Mount | Democratic | 7,106 (35.67%) | Run-off |
| Paul A. Savoie Sr. | Democratic | 4,853 (24.36%) | Run-off |
| Mark T. Abraham | Independent | 4,547 (22.83%) | Defeated |
| "Ken" Schexnider | Democratic | 3,413 (17.13%) | Defeated |

Second Ballot, May 1, 1993

| Candidate | Affiliation | Support | Outcome |
|---|---|---|---|
| Willie Landry Mount | Democratic | 10,429 (52.46%) | Elected |
| Paul A. Savoie Sr. | Democratic | 9,451 (47.54%) | Defeated |

Mount was unopposed for a second term as mayor.

Louisiana State Senator, 27th Senatorial District, 1999

October 23, 1999

| Candidate | Affiliation | Support | Outcome |
|---|---|---|---|
| Willie Landry Mount | Democratic | 23,271 (80.15%) | Elected |
| Anita Fields | Democratic | 4,240 (14.60%) | Defeated |
| Thimothy "Thimco" Francis Sr. | Independent | 1,522 (5.24%) | Defeated |

Mount was unopposed on October 4, 2003, and October 20, 2007, for her second and third term as state senator.

U.S. Representative, 7th Congressional District, 2004

Threshold > 50%

First Ballot, November 2, 2004

| Candidate | Affiliation | Support | Outcome |
|---|---|---|---|
| Charles Boustany Jr. | Republican | 105,761 (38.61%) | Run-off |
| Willie Landry Mount | Democratic | 69,079 (25.22%) | Run-off |
| "Don" Cravins | Democratic | 67,389 (24.60%) | Defeated |
| David Thibodaux | Republican | 26,526 (9.68%) | Defeated |
| Malcolm R. Carriere | Democratic | 5,177 (1.89%) | Defeated |

Second Ballot, December 4, 2004

| Candidate | Affiliation | Support | Outcome |
|---|---|---|---|
| Charles Boustany Jr. | Republican | 75,039 (54.96%) | Elected |
| Willie Landry Mount | Democratic | 61,493 (45.04%) | Defeated |

== See also ==
- List of mayors of Lake Charles, Louisiana
