= Cambyretá =

- district
- Location within Paraguay
- Coordinates: 27°21′0″S 55°46′48″W
- Country: Paraguay
- Department: Itapúa Department
- Founded: 23 April 1946

Population (2022)
  - Total: 47,717

Cambyretá (Guarani for Land of Milk) is a town and district in the Itapúa Department of Paraguay. It is located in the southern part of the country, about 380 kilometers south of the national capital, Asunción and 13 kilometers east of the department capital, Encarnación. The district spans 205.2 square kilometers and has evolved into a mostly urban and working-age community, with its population reaching 47,717 residents as of the 2022 Paraguayan census. Culturally, Cambyretá is notable as the birthplace of the tallest Paraguayan basketball player, Arnoldo Penzkofer, whose local legacy is preserved through the local municipal sports center.

== Geography and location ==
Cambyretá is located in the southern part of Paraguay, in the Itapúa Department, about 380 kilometers south of the national capital, Asunción and 13 kilometers east of the department capital, Encarnación.

== Name ==
The meaning of Cambyretá in the Guarani language is "Land of Milk".

== Demographics ==
According to data from the General Directorate of Statistics of Paraguay, the population of Cambyretá grew from 27,808 inhabitants recorded in the 2002 Paraguayan census to 47,717 inhabitants recorded in the 2022 Paraguayan census, representing an annual growth rate of 2.7% over the two decade period. Across the district's total area of 205.2 square kilometers, this population size yields a population density of 232.6 people per square kilometer. The 2022 census data revealed a balanced gender distribution, consisting of 24,617 (51.6%) males and 23,100 (48.4%) females. Structurally, the population is predominantly urban and working age. Approximately 81.6% (38,920 people) reside in urban centers compared to 18.4% (8,797 people) in rural areas, while 68.1% (32,512 people) fall into the 15-64 age bracket, with children aged 0-14 making up 25.2% (12,027 people) and elderly residents aged 65 and older accounting for the remaining 6.7% (3,178 people).

== Notable people ==
Cambyretá is the birthplace of Arnoldo Penzkofer, a famous 2.12-meter-tall athlete celebrated as the tallest basketball player in Paraguayan history. Discovered locally at age 18 while selling milk, he went on to anchor Paraguay's national team, compete for renowned teams in Buenos Aires and São Paulo, and win multiple domestic club championships. His enduring legacy within the sport is carried on by his two sons, who followed in his footsteps to play basketball for Sol de América. The district honors Penzkofer's memory through its local municipal sports center which is named "El Nene Penzkofer" as a tribute to him.
