= Flavin reductase =

flavin reductase

Identifiers
- EC no.: 1.5.1.30
- CAS no.: 56626-29-0

Databases
- BRENDA: enzyme data
- ExPASy: NiceZyme view
- KEGG: enzyme entry
- MetaCyc: metabolic pathway
- Rhea: reactions
- PDB structures: RCSB PDB PDBe PDBsum
- Gene Ontology: AmiGO / QuickGO
Search
- PMC: articles
- PubMed: articles
- NCBI: proteins

Flavin reductase a class of enzymes. There are a variety of flavin reductases, (i.e. FRP, FRE, FRG, etc.) which bind free flavins and through hydrogen bonding, catalyze the reduction of these molecules to a reduced flavin. Riboflavin, or vitamin B, and flavin mononucleotide are two of the most well known flavins in the body and are used in a variety of processes which include metabolism of fat and ketones and the reduction of methemoglobin in erythrocytes. Flavin reductases are similar and often confused for ferric reductases because of their similar catalytic mechanism and structures.

In enzymology, a flavin reductase (EC 1.5.1.30) is an enzyme that catalyzes the chemical reaction

riboflavin + NADPH + H^{+} $\rightleftharpoons$ reduced riboflavin + NADP^{+}

Thus, the two products of this enzyme are reduced riboflavin and NADP^{+}, whereas its 3 substrates are riboflavin, NADPH, and H^{+}.

This enzyme belongs to the family of oxidoreductases, specifically those acting on the CH-NH group of donors with NAD^{+} or NADP^{+} as acceptor. The systematic name of this enzyme class is reduced-riboflavin:NADP+ oxidoreductase. Other names in common use include flavine mononucleotide (FMN) reductase, FMN reductase (NADPH), NADPH-dependent FMN reductase, NADPH-flavin reductase, NADPH-FMN reductase, NADPH-specific FMN reductase, NADPH2 dehydrogenase (flavin), NADPH2:riboflavin oxidoreductase, NADPH:flavin oxidoreductase, riboflavin mononucleotide reductase, riboflavine mononucleotide reductase and riboflavin mononucleotide (reduced nicotinamide adenine dinucleotide, phosphate) reductase.

== Structures of reactants and products ==
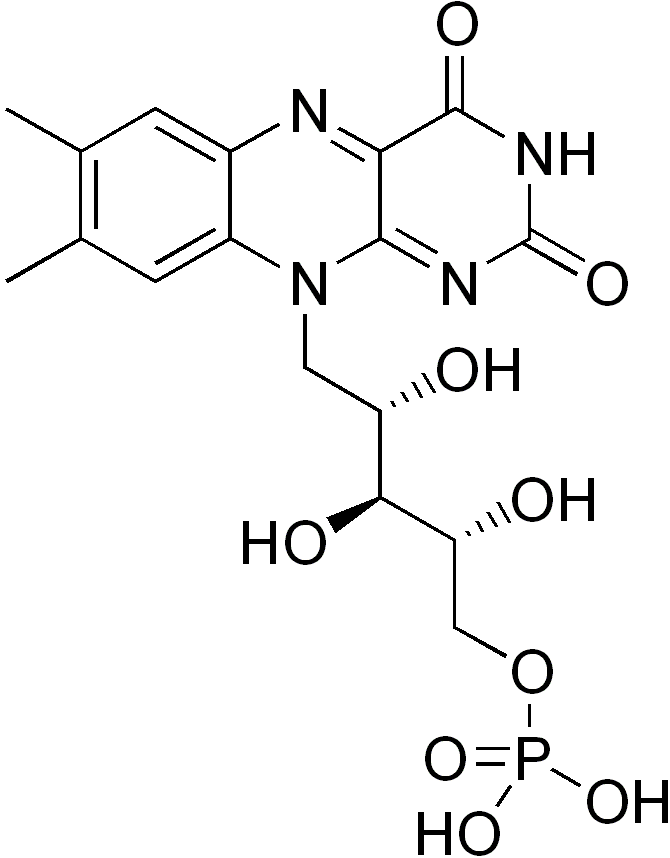
This is the structure of flavin mononucleotide (FMN).

This is the structure of NADPH.

This is the structure of reduced flavin mononucleotide (FMNH_{2}).

This is the structure of NADP+.

Flavin reductase is a dimer made up of two subunits. Each subunit is similar. Flavin reductase P, FRP, was studied by Tanner, Lei, Tu and Krause and was discovered to have a structure made up of two subunits each containing a sandwich domain and an excursion domain. The excursion domains of each subunit reach out to connect the sandwich domain of the other subunit. This creates a large hydrophobic core in flavin reductase The enzyme has two binding sites, one for NADPH and one for the flavin mononucleotide substrate. The isoalloxazine ring of flavin mononucleotide is where reduction occurs. Therefore, this is where flavin creates a variety of hydrogen bonds to connect to the amino acid side chains of flavin reductase. Side chains 167–169 in FRP block the isoalloxazine ring in FAD from binding the enzyme, making FRP an FMN specific flavin reductase. The placement of methyl groups in the isoalloxazine ring can also have an effect on the binding and specificity of the enzyme for substrate. There is a depletion of a C-terminal extension that allows for the binding of NADPH, and studies show that if it is removed, it is depleted, catalytic activity increases.

== Mechanism ==
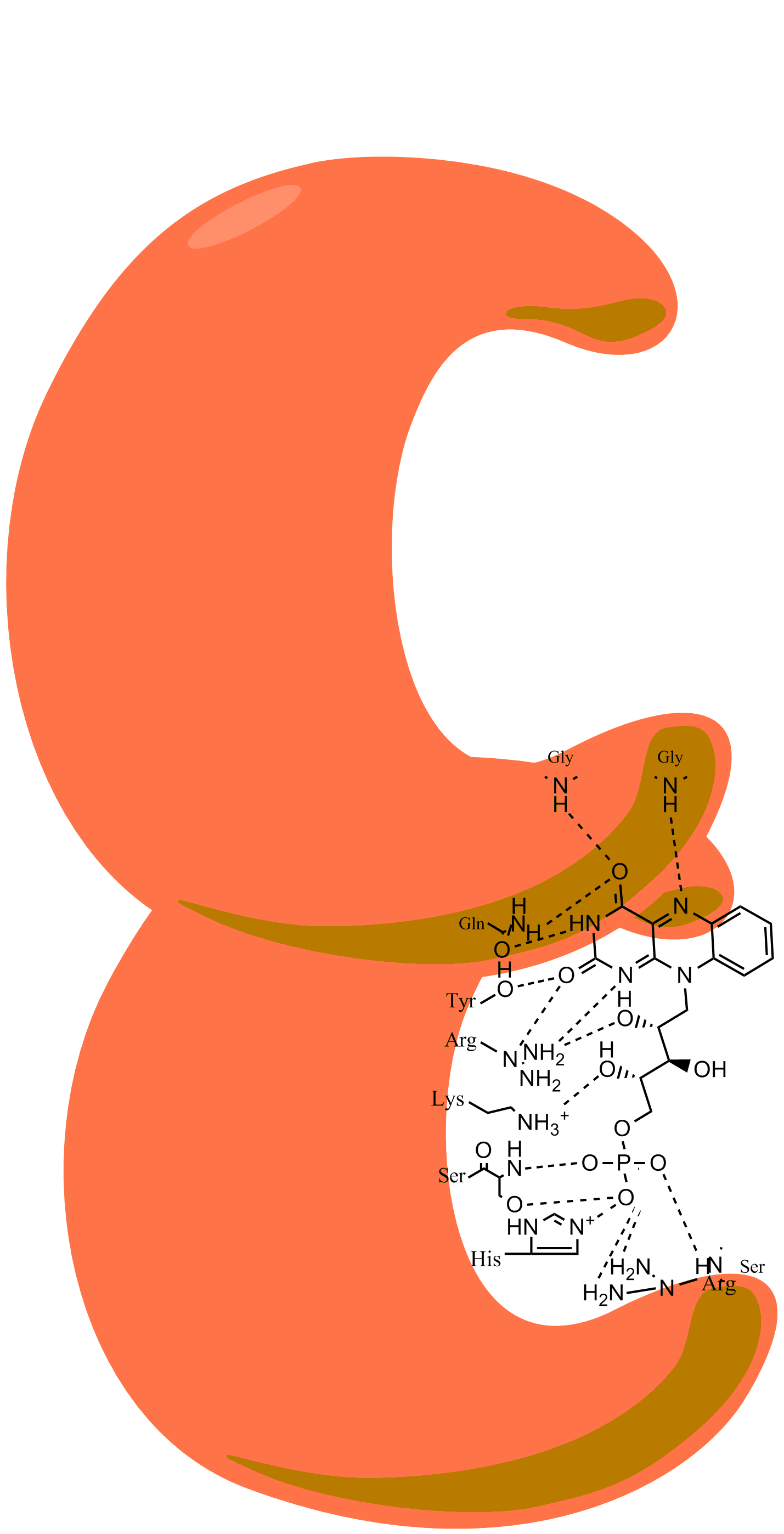
This shows the hydrogen bonding of flavin reductase with flavin mononucleotide.

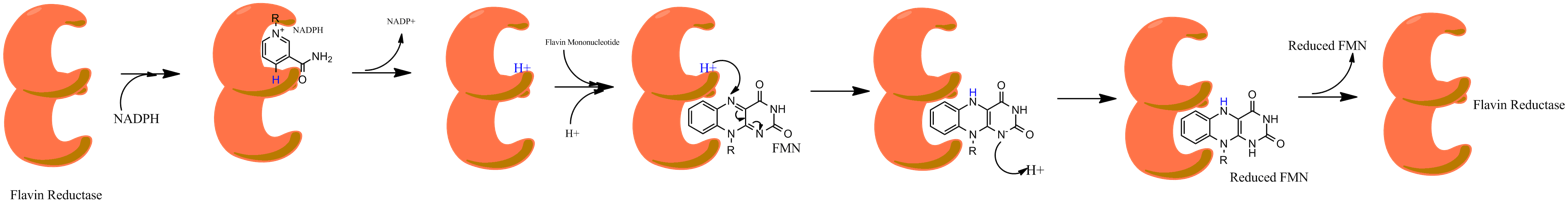
The ping pong mechanism is shown with NADPH binding first and leaving as NADP+ before FMN is bound by Flavin Reductase.

The mechanism of the flavin reductase process is described above and most likely follows the ping pong kinetic pattern. This means that it is a bisubstrate-biproduct mechanism. First the flavin reductase enzyme binds NADPH and stabilizes the release of the hydride. Because of sterics, it is not possible for the enzyme to bind both NADPH and the flavin. For this reason, NADP+ is released and then the flavin substrate is bound to the enzyme. In this step, the hydride attacks Nitrogen on the flavin, which allows for another protonation. Then, reduced flavin is released from flavin reductase as the second product. In this way, the reduction of flavin is dependent on flavin reductase binding first to NADPH, or in some cases NADH.

== Biological function ==
Flavin reductases exist in a variety of organisms, including animals and bacteria. In luminous organisms, flavin reductase is important in the luciferase process. In an experiment with P. fischeri and B. harveyi cells, bioluminescence was increased as the in vivo concentration of flavin reductase was increased. This suggests a connection between either a flavin reductase-luciferase complex or reduced flavin and the luminescence process in bacteria. The bacteria oxidize the reduced flavin mononucleotide to oxidized FMN and transfer it through free fusion to generate light.

In humans, flavin reductase often catalyzes an NADPH dependent reduction of flavin mononucleotide which occurs in methemoglobin in erythrocytes and the liver.

It has also been suggested that flavin reductases play a role in the production of hydrogen peroxide. This would be biologically helpful as H_{2}O_{2} assists the body in maintaining homeostatic microbiota. A study showed that women with lactobacillus that produced hydrogen peroxide were less likely to develop bacterial vaginosis prebirth. It was also seen in Trichomonas vaginalis that decreased levels of flavin reductase increased the cycling of metronidazole because flavin reductase has an antioxidative effect, which decreases oxygen levels, maintaining the metronidazole population.

== Future of the enzyme ==
Currently, it is seen that bacterial flavin reductase can be used to sensitize carcinomas, or tumors to pro drugs. At first, flavin reductases were used to target the hypoxia of tumors. However, current research is showing an interest in these reductase molecules, specifically, MSuE from Pseudomonas aeruginosa which has been shown to increase the effectiveness of the prodrugs for cancerous tumors. A dual flavin reductase has been shown to participate in the activation of anticancer drugs. There are also molecules that when oxidized can be carcinogenic. In this case, it is helpful to have flavin reductase to reduce these molecules, such as carcinogenic chromate.
