= History of Lake Charles, Louisiana =

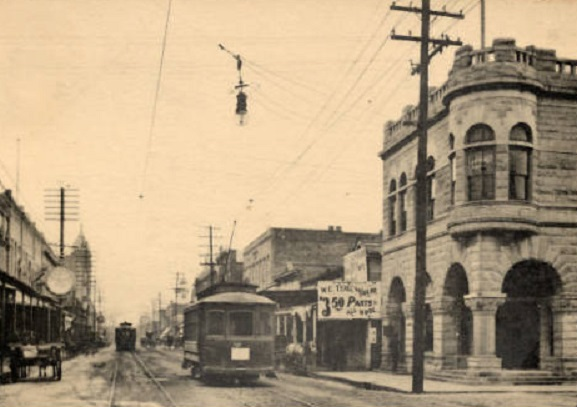
A view of Ryan Street around the turn of the twentieth century, looking south.

== History ==
=== 18th and 19th centuries ===
==== Early historical events, settlement and incorporation ====
Before European colonisation, the Lake Charles area was home to the Native American Atakapa Ishak tribe. The first European colonizers arrived in the 1760s.

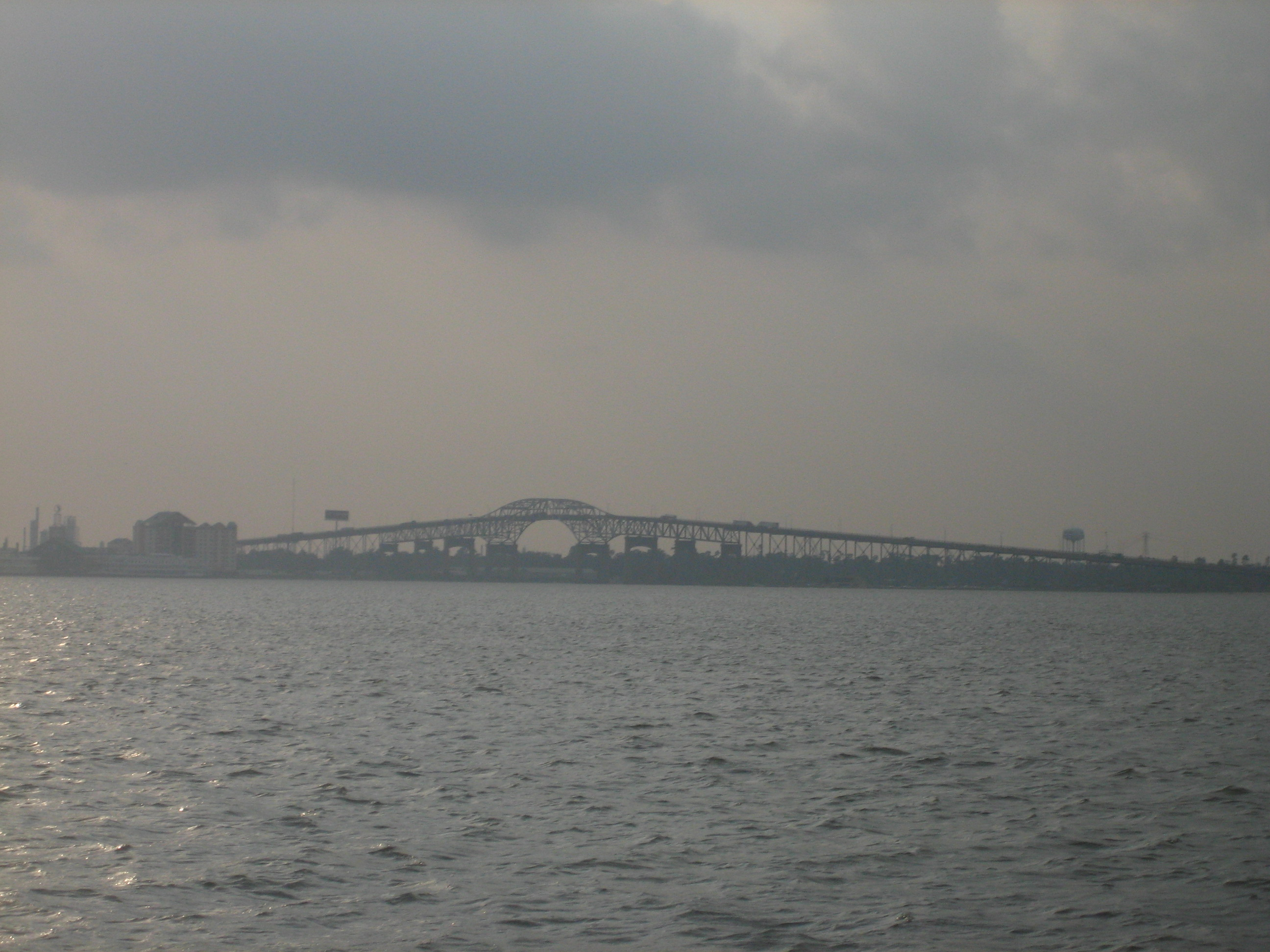
The Calcasieu River Bridge as seen from downtown Lake Charles.

In 1781, Martin LeBleu and his wife, Dela Marion, of Bordeaux, France, were the first recorded Europeans to colonize the area now known as the LeBleu Settlement. Charles Sallier, one of the first colonizers, married LeBleu's daughter, Catherine LeBleu. The Salliers built their home on the beach in what is current-day Lake Charles. The area on the east side of the Calcasieu River was defined as the southern part of the "Neutral Ground" until ratification of the Adams-Onís Treaty in 1821. The infamous pirate, Jean Lafitte, once delivered stolen slaves and contraband to James Bowie and other enslavers in the area. By 1860, the area become known as Charles Town, in Sallier's honor.

The Rio Hondo, which flowed through Lake Charles, was later called Quelqueshue, a Native American term meaning "Crying Eagle". Transliterated through French, that became the name of Calcasieu Parish. On March 7, 1861, Lake Charles was officially incorporated as the town of Charleston, Louisiana.

==== Industrial growth and the Civil War ====
The city's growth was fairly slow until Captain Daniel Goos, a Frisian by birth, came to the city in 1855. Goos established a lumber mill and schooner dock, in what became known as Goosport. He promoted a profitable trade with Texan and Mexican ports by sending his schooner downriver into the Gulf of Mexico. Until the arrival of Goos, Jacob Ryan dominated the lumber industry. Between 1817 and 1855, timber sales from longleaf pine and bald cypress remained the city's primary source of revenue.

Jacob Ryan convinced the state government to move the parish seat to Lake Charles from its former location at Marion, a settlement about eight miles (13 km) upriver. Later that year, Ryan and Samuel Kirby transferred the parish courthouse and jail by barge to the then-named Charleston. Six years after the city was incorporated, dissatisfaction over the name Charleston arose and, on March 16, 1867, Charleston, Louisiana, was renamed and incorporated as the town of Lake Charles.

By the time of the U.S. Civil War, many Americans from the North, along with a large influx of continental Europeans and Jews, had settled the area. Attitudes toward slavery in Lake Charles were mixed, because slavery was secondary to business interests. In fact, fewer than five percent of the population were slaves. Many citizens became involved in the war. Some local families supported the Confederacy, while others supported the cause of the Union.

==== After the Civil War ====
In the years following the Civil War, Lake Charles regained its status as a lumbering center. Especially in the 1880s, the city saw an increase in population and economic demand largely due to an innovative advertising campaign by J.B. Watkins. Thanks to that campaign, the city's population grew four-hundred percent during the decade.

Using the pine wood from the city's mills, construction of large Victorian mansions transformed Lake Charles during the 1890s. Carpenters competed enthusiastically to out-build each other, using elaborate fretwork and decoration. The area of present-day Lake Charles just east of downtown is known as the "Charpentier Historic District", from the French word for carpenter, and features unique homes from that era.

==== Lumber industry ====
In the early 1880s, Michigan lumber tycoons, including R. H. Nason and N. B. Bradley, as well as William E. Ramsey (originally from Canada), had purchased large tracts of land in the area. In 1887 the "Bradley-Ramsey Lumber Company" was formed by the "Michigan Men", who included Ramsey, Nason, Bradley, Lewis Penoyer and Benton Hatchett, owning over 150,000 acres. The company built two sawmills, Michigan mill and the Mt. Hope mill, in the area. The mill of J. A. Bel, a local businessman, originally from New Orleans but in the area from youth, became the second largest.

=== Twentieth century ===
On April 23, 1910, a great fire, known as the "Great Fire of 1910", devastated much of the city. The 1890 courthouse, along with most of downtown Lake Charles, was destroyed. Two months afterwards, the Louisiana legislature divided the former Imperial Calcasieu Parish into the current parishes of Allen, Beauregard, Cameron, Jefferson Davis and Calcasieu. However, Lake Charles soon rebuilt itself and continued to grow and expand.

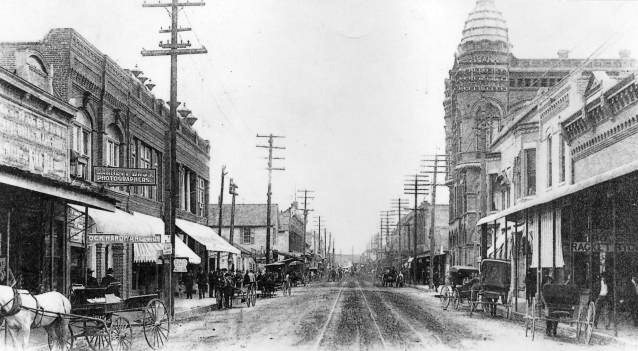
Ryan Street in Lake Charles, 1903.

==== 1912 ====
By 1912, the American Lumberman Equipment Register listed the J. A. Bel Lumber Company., Ltd, Calcasieu Long Leaf Lumber Company (Hdq. Long-Bell Lumber Co. Kansas City, Mo.), Hodge Fence & Lumber Company (machine shop and 12 miles of railroad), Lyons Lumber Company (also in Thicket, Texas) with four miles of railroad, and Powell Lumber Company with a machine shop.

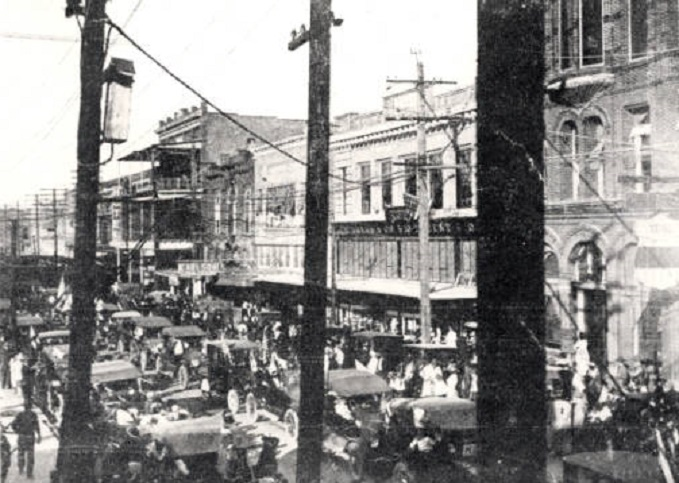
A view of downtown Lake Charles, circa 1917

After World War II, Lake Charles experienced industrial growth with the onset of the petrochemical refining industries. The Lake Charles Civic Center, built on reclaimed land on the lakefront in the 1970s, hosted many national shows, acts, and pop singers such as Elvis Presley. The population of the city reached some 80,000 people in the early 1980s, but with a local economic recession, it declined. With the advent of the gaming industry, the city began to grow again. As of the 2000 United States census, the city had a population of 71,757.

=== Present day ===
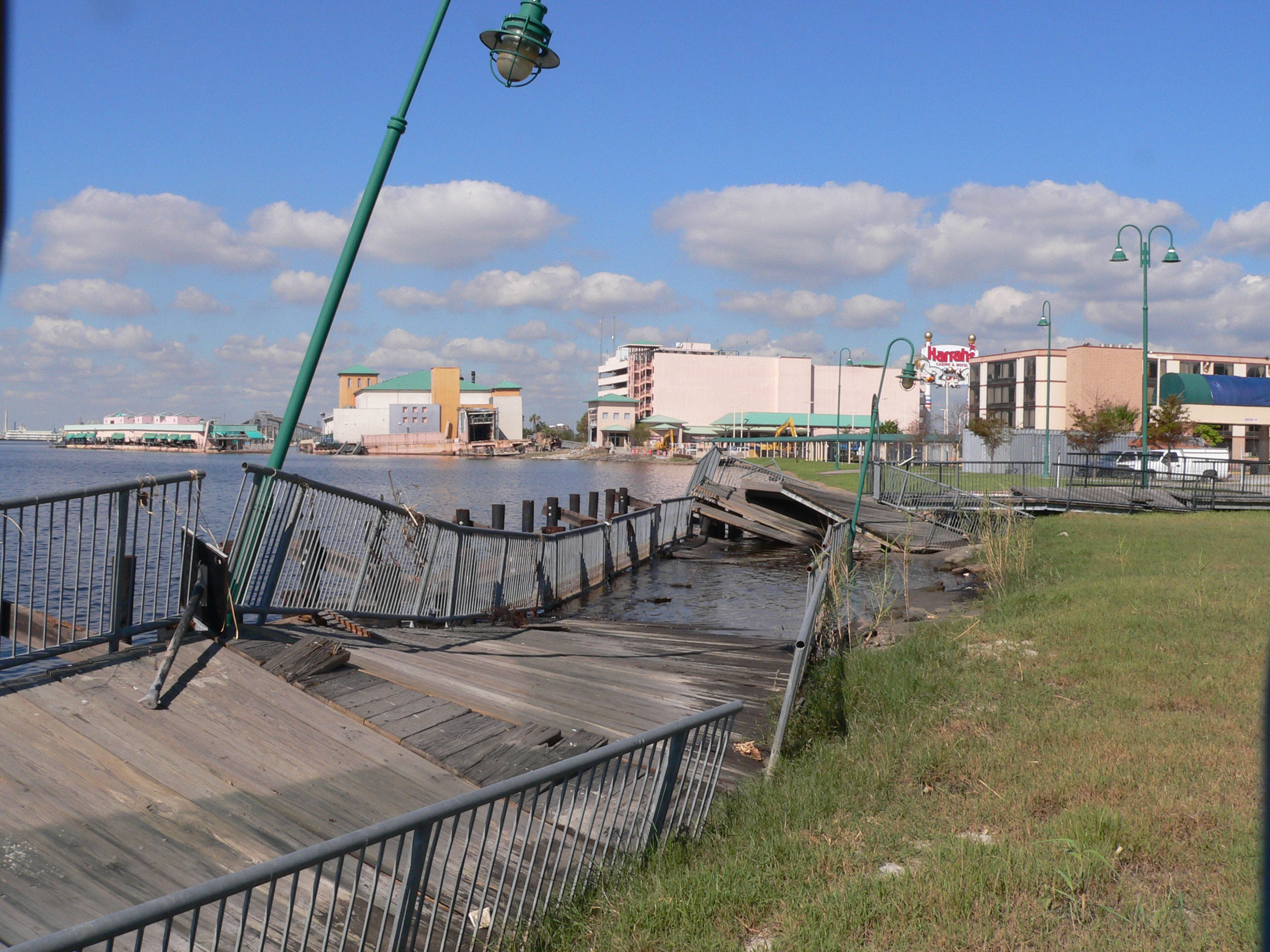
The destructive force of Hurricane Rita. Looking down the remains of the lakefront boardwalk toward the damaged Harrah's Lake Charles Casino property.

Lake Charles suffered extensive damage from Hurricane Rita, which struck the city as a Category 3 storm early September 24, 2005. On September 22, the mayor ordered a mandatory evacuation of the city, and approximately ninety percent of the residents left. Evacuees were asked to not return for 48 hours, due to wind and flood damage. There was extensive damage to the city's electrical grid, and many areas did not have power restored for up to three weeks.

On June 20, 2006, a Citgo petroleum plant located in Sulphur, Louisiana released between 15,000 and 18,000 barrels (2.4 and 2.9 megalitres) of oil into the Calcasieu Ship Channel. The United States Coast Guard was called in to contain the spilled oil, which had by that time flowed down the Calcasieu River. Because of the disaster, the Coast Guard had to close many waterways, including the Calcasieu River Channel and a one-mile (1.6 km) stretch of the Gulf Intracoastal Waterway. The Port of Lake Charles remained closed for some time after the accident, due to contamination.

Oil prices surged to over $74 per barrel, in part due to the Citgo spillage. The Calcasieu Refining Co., which normally processes 76,500 barrels (12.16 megalitres) of oil a day, was working at low levels for weeks after the incident.

As part of the city's recovery from Hurricane Rita, elected officials proposed a plan to renovate the downtown area to make it more attractive and pedestrian-friendly. A primary concern for the revitalization was to include quality and affordable housing. To fund that proposal, officials proposed a city-wide bond issue. To date, about one third of the 90-million dollar bond proposal has been spent. The Lakefront Promenade is currently under construction, as is the 52-berth marina just south of the Civic Center grounds. The monies issued from the bond will also be used for other capital projects throughout the city.

In 2008, a report showed that overall criminal offenses in the city were down 15%, and major crimes were down 9%.

In 2020, the city was badly damaged again by Category 4 Hurricane Laura. Many homes were damaged or destroyed and the Capital One Building was heavily damaged, with many of its windows being blown out. It was later demolished on September 7, 2024.

== See also ==
- List of mayors of Lake Charles, Louisiana
