= Conway LeBleu =

American politician (1918–2007)

Glenn Conway LeBleu

Louisiana State Representative for District 36 (Calcasieu and Cameron parishes)
- In office May 1964 – March 1988
- Preceded by: Alvin Dyson
- Succeeded by: Randy Roach

Personal details
- Born: October 4, 1918 Lake Charles, Calcasieu Parish; Louisiana, USA
- Died: October 11, 2007 (aged 89) Lake Charles, Louisiana
- Resting place: McCall Cemetery in Grand Chenier in Cameron Parish
- Party: Democratic
- Spouse: Virgie Annie McCall LeBleu (married 1950-2007, his death)
- Children: No children
- Education: McNeese Junior College Colorado A&M University Louisiana State University
- Occupation: Farmer and cattleman

Glenn Conway LeBleu, known as Conway LeBleu (October 4, 1918 – October 11, 2007), was an American politician from Louisiana who served in the Louisiana House of Representatives from 1964 to 1988.

== Early life and education ==
He graduated from Lake Charles High School in 1935. In 1942, during World War II, he enlisted in the United States Army Air Forces, and served in the Pacific Theater, later becoming a staff sergeant. He then attended McNeese State College and Colorado State University, and graduated from Louisiana State University with a Bachelor of Science in animal husbandry in 1950.

== Later life ==
He is buried at McCall Cemetery, Grand Chenier, Cameron Parish, Louisiana.

Political offices
Preceded by Alvin Dyson	Louisiana State Representative for District 36 (Calcasieu and Cameron parishes); 1964–1988	Succeeded by Randy Roach
