= BLUF domain =

BLUF
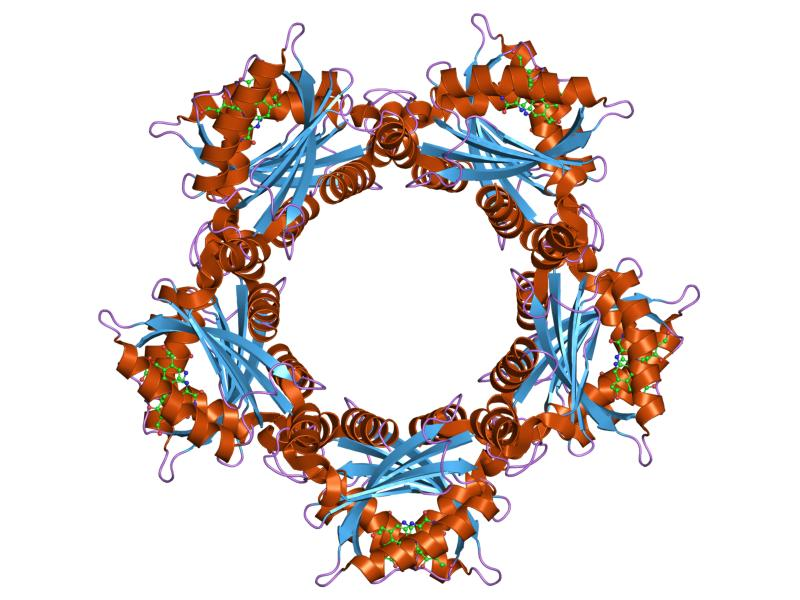
- structure of a cyanobacterial bluf protein, tll0078

Identifiers
- Symbol: BLUF
- Pfam: PF04940
- InterPro: IPR007024
Available protein structures:
- Pfam: structures / ECOD
- PDB: RCSB PDB; PDBe; PDBj
- PDBsum: structure summary

In molecular biology, the BLUF domain (sensors of blue-light using FAD) is a FAD-binding protein domain. They are present in various proteins, primarily from bacteria, for example a BLUF domain is found at the N-terminus of the AppA protein from Rhodobacter sphaeroides. The BLUF domain is involved in sensing blue-light (and possibly redox) using FAD and is similar to the flavin-binding PAS domains and cryptochromes. The predicted secondary structure reveals that the BLUF domain has a novel FAD-binding fold.
