= List of mayors of Lake Charles, Louisiana =

The following is a list of mayors of the city of Lake Charles, Louisiana, United States.

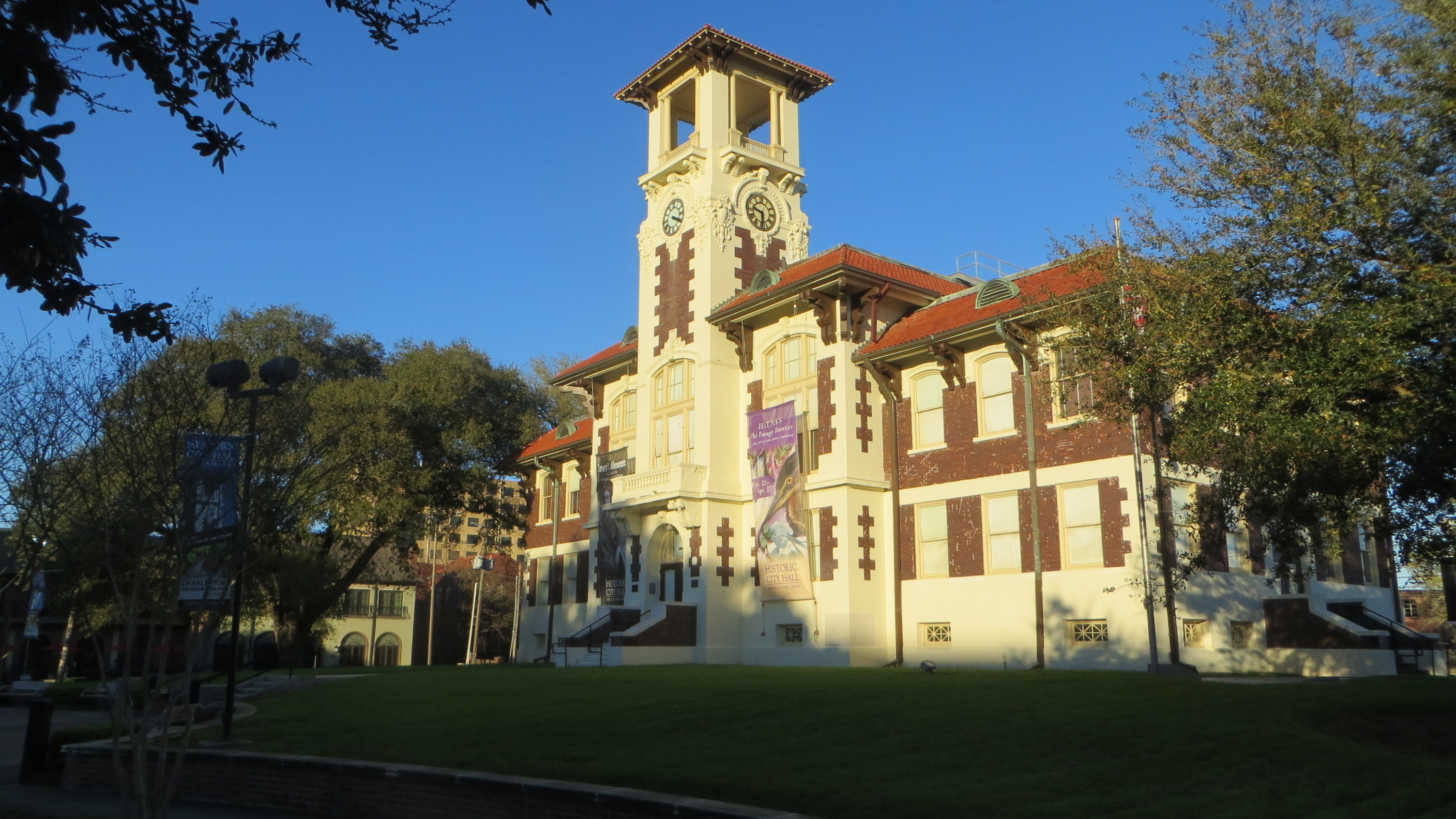
Former city hall building in Lake Charles, Louisiana, built in 1911 (photo 2019)

- James W. Bryan, 1868-1871
- John A. Spence, 1871-1873
- A.H. Moss, 1873-1874
- William Meyers, 1874-1887
- Adolph Meyer, 1887-1888
- Alexander L. Reid, 1888-1892
- Patrick Crowley, 1893-1899
- James P. Geary, 1899-1900
- John H. Poe, 1901-1903
- Charles H. Winterhalter, 1903-1909
- C. Brent Richard, 1909-1913
- George L. Riling, 1913-1916
- Josh A. Trotti, 1917-1925
- Henry J. Geary, 1925-1929
- Leon Locke, 1929-1933
- J. A. Trotti, 1933-1936
- Jack H. Handley, 1936-1945
- Thomas Cameron Price, 1945-1953
- Sidney L. Gray, 1953-1961
- Alfred E. Roberts, 1961-1965
- James Sudduth, 1965-1974, 1989-1993
- Sammie Bono, 1974
- William (Bill) E. Boyer, 1974-1981
- Paul Savoie, 1981-1985
- Edward S. Watson, 1985-1989
- Willie Landry Mount, 1993-1999
- Rodney Geyen , 1999-2000
- Randy Roach, 2000-2017
- Nic Hunter, 2017–2025
- Marshall Simien Jr, 2025 - present

== See also ==
- History of Lake Charles, Louisiana
