= 2'-hydroxybiphenyl-2-sulfinate desulfinase =

Class of enzymes

2-(2-hydroxyphenyl)benzenesulfinate hydrolase

Identifiers
- EC no.: 3.13.1.3

Databases
- BRENDA: enzyme data
- ExPASy: NiceZyme view
- KEGG: enzyme entry
- MetaCyc: metabolic pathway
- Rhea: reactions
- PDB structures: RCSB PDB PDBe PDBsum
- Gene Ontology: AmiGO / QuickGO
Search
- PMC: articles
- PubMed: articles
- NCBI: proteins

2'-hydroxybiphenyl-2-sulfinate desulfinase (EC 3.13.1.3) is an enzyme characterised from Rhodococcus species that catalyzes the hydrolysis of 2′-hydroxy-2-biphenylsulfinic acid to 2-phenylphenol and sulfurous acid:

2′-hydroxy-2-biphenylsulfinic acid
H_{2}O
H_{2}SO_{3}
2-phenylphenol

A mechanism for the reaction involving electrophilic aromatic substitution and direct loss of sulfur dioxide has been proposed. The enzyme has been of interest as a means of biodesulfurization, the removal of sulfur from crude oil and other feedstocks.

This enzyme is a hydrolase, specifically one acting on carbon-sulfur bonds. The systematic name of this enzyme class is 2'-hydroxybiphenyl-2-sulfinate sulfohydrolase. Other names in common use include gene dszB-encoded hydrolase, 2-(2-hydroxyphenyl) benzenesulfinate:H_{2}O hydrolase, DszB, HBPSi desulfinase, 2-(2-hydroxyphenyl) benzenesulfinate sulfohydrolase, HPBS desulfinase, 2-(2-hydroxyphenyl)benzenesulfinate hydrolase, 2-(2'-hydroxyphenyl)benzenesulfinate desulfinase, and 2-(2-hydroxyphenyl)benzenesulfinate desulfinase.

== Structural studies ==
As of late 2007, 3 structures have been solved for this class of enzymes, with PDB accession codes PDB: 2DE2, PDB: 2DE3, and PDB: 2DE4.
