= 4,6-Dimethyldibenzothiophene =

Names
- Preferred IUPAC name 4,6-Dimethyldibenzo[b,d]thiophene
- Other names 4,6-DMDBT

Identifiers
CAS Number	1207-12-1
3D model (JSmol)	Interactive image
ChemSpider	1064783
EC Number	214-894-7
PubChem CID	1268103
- InChI: InChI=1S/C14H12S/c1-9-5-3-7-11-12-8-4-6-10(2)14(12)15-13(9)11/h3-8H,1-2H3 Key: MYAQZIAVOLKEGW-UHFFFAOYSA-N
- SMILES: CC1=C2C(=CC=C1)C3=CC=CC(=C3S2)C

Properties
Chemical formula	C_{14}H_{12}S
Molar mass	212.31 g·mol^{−1}
Appearance	white solid
Density	1.18 g/cm^{3}
Melting point	153–157 °C (307–315 °F; 426–430 K)

Hazards
- GHS labelling
Pictograms	(GHS07: Exclamation mark)
Signal word	Warning
Hazard statements	H302
Precautionary statements	P264, P270, P301+P317, P330, P501
- Except where otherwise noted, data are given for materials in their standard state (at 25 °C [77 °F], 100 kPa). Infobox references

4,6-Dimethyldibenzothiophene is an organosulfur compound with the formula (C_{6}H_{3}CH_{3})_{2}S. It is one of several possible isomeric dimethyl dibenzothiophenes.

The compound is of particular interest as an organosulfur contaminant in petroleum that resists desulfurization. The methyl groups shield the sulfur center from desulfurization.

The compound can be oxidized to the sulfoxide with hydrogen peroxide. Many methods for synthesis of this compound have been described. Often the methods proceed via derivatives of diphenyl sulfide.
