= Isoalloxazine =

Names
- IUPAC name 1H-benzo[g]pteridine-2,4-dione
- Other names 1,2,3,4-Tetrahydrobenzopteridine-2,4-dione; Benzo(g)pteridine-2,4(1H,3H)-dione

Identifiers
CAS Number	490-59-5
3D model (JSmol)	Interactive image
Beilstein Reference	85819
ChEBI	CHEBI:37325
ChEMBL	ChEMBL68500
ChemSpider	4522915
ECHA InfoCard	100.007.014
EC Number	207-714-3
IUPHAR/BPS	456
PubChem CID	5372720
UNII	880W3VF9YW
CompTox Dashboard (EPA)	DTXSID50197656
- InChI: InChI=1S/C10H6N4O2/c15-9-7-8(13-10(16)14-9)12-6-4-2-1-3-5(6)11-7/h1-4H,(H2,12,13,14,15,16) Key: HAUGRYOERYOXHX-UHFFFAOYSA-N
- SMILES: C1=CC=C2C(=C1)N=C3C(=N2)NC(=O)NC3=O

Properties
Chemical formula	C_{10}H_{6}N_{4}O_{2}
Molar mass	214.184 g·mol^{−1}
Appearance	Red solid
Melting point	200 °C (392 °F; 473 K)
- Except where otherwise noted, data are given for materials in their standard state (at 25 °C [77 °F], 100 kPa). Infobox references

Isoalloxazine is the structural foundation of flavins such as riboflavin (vitamin B2) and is a heterocyclic compound. It has a tricyclic structure which means it has three interconnected rings of atoms and is a tautomer of alloxazine. The structure is formed by primary-secondary aromatic o-diamines and they are a high-melting crystalline substance. The R-group is used to attach various flavin groups It has a similar structure to pteridines which has two interconnected rings. Isoalloxazine was first obtained in 1934 by Richard Kuhn an Austrian-German biochemist and lab mates.

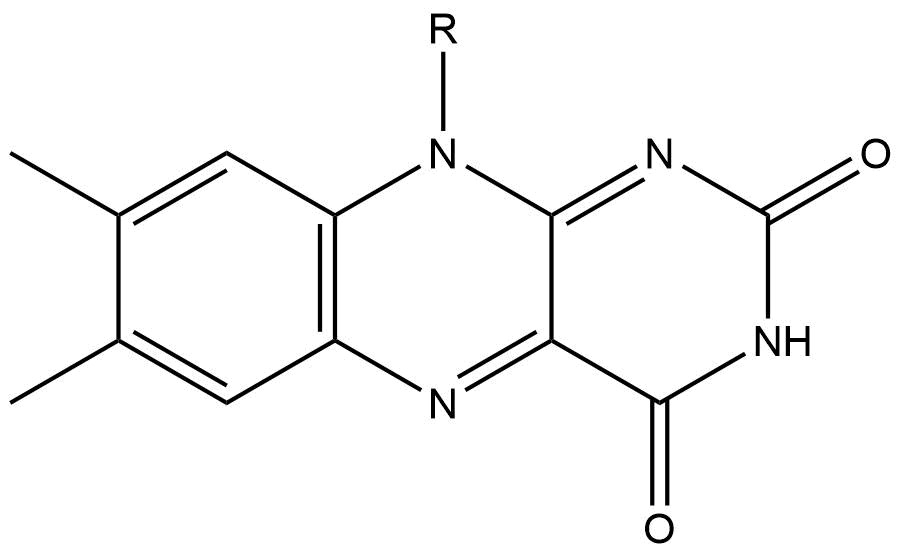
Isoalloxazine Structure

== Isoalloxazine ring ==
Isoalloxazine rings can exist in different redox and ionization states depending on the chemistry of FMN and FAD associated with it. Using the redox-active isoalloxazine system, FAD and FMN are able to do one and two electron transfer reactions and also be coupled with proton transfers.

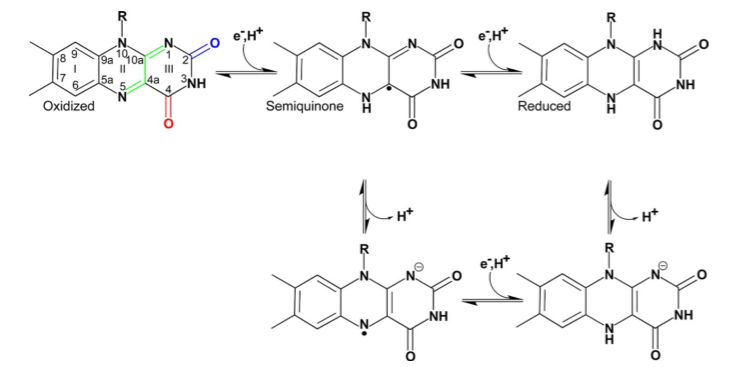
Ionization and redox states of the isoalloxazine ring
