= Dan Flavin (politician) =

American politician (1957–2024)

Member of the Louisiana House of Representatives from the 36th district
- In office 1996–2005
- Preceded by: Randy Roach
- Succeeded by: Chuck Kleckley

Personal details
- Born: May 31, 1957 Joliet, Illinois, U.S.
- Died: June 6, 2024 (aged 67) Lake Charles, Louisiana, U.S.
- Party: Democratic; Republican
- Education: McNeese State University

Daniel Thomas Flavin (May 31, 1957 – June 6, 2024) was an American politician and real estate broker. He served as a Republican member for the 36th district of the Louisiana House of Representatives.

Flavin died in Lake Charles, Louisiana on June 6, 2024, at the age of 67.
