= Optical and Quantum Electronics =

- Discipline: Optical physics, optical engineering
- Language: English
- Edited by: Daoxin Dai, Trevor M. Benson, Marian Marciniak

Publication details
- History: 1969-present
- Publisher: Springer Science+Business Media
- Frequency: Monthly
- Impact factor: 4.0 (2024)

Standard abbreviations
- ISO 4: Opt. Quantum Electron.

Indexing
- CODEN: OQELDI
- ISSN: 0306-8919 (print); 1572-817X (web)

Links
- Journal homepage

Optical and Quantum Electronics is a peer-reviewed scientific journal published monthly by Springer Science+Business Media. It covers original research and tutorials in optical physics, optoelectronics, photonics, and quantum electronics. Its editors-in-chief are Daoxin Dai, Trevor M. Benson, and Marian Marciniak. The journal had to retract over 200 papers in 2024 due to issues like compromised peer review, the use of inappropriate or irrelevant references, and the presence of nonsensical phrases—indicating possible blind reliance on AI or machine translation software.

== Abstracting and indexing ==
The journal is abstracted and indexed in different databases, including:

- Current Contents/Engineering, Computing & Technology
- Inspec
- Science Citation Index Expanded
- Scopus

According to the Journal Citation Reports, the journal has a 2024 impact factor of 4.0 .
