= E. coli nitroreductase =

Microbial protein found in Escherichia coli str. K-12 substr. MG1655

E. coli nitroreductase is a flavoprotein found in the bacteria Escherichia coli. It catalyses the reduction of nitro groups in a wide range of substrates to produce the corresponding hydroxylamine. Although its role in vivo is unclear, it has been identified as useful in the metabolism of a number of prodrugs in anti-cancer gene therapy.

There are at least two oxygen-insensitive nitroreductases in E. coli. The major one is NfsA (P17117, EC 1.7.1.B3). The other is NfsB (P38489, EC 1.5.1.34).

== See also ==
- Reduction of nitro compounds
