= Dibenzothiophene =

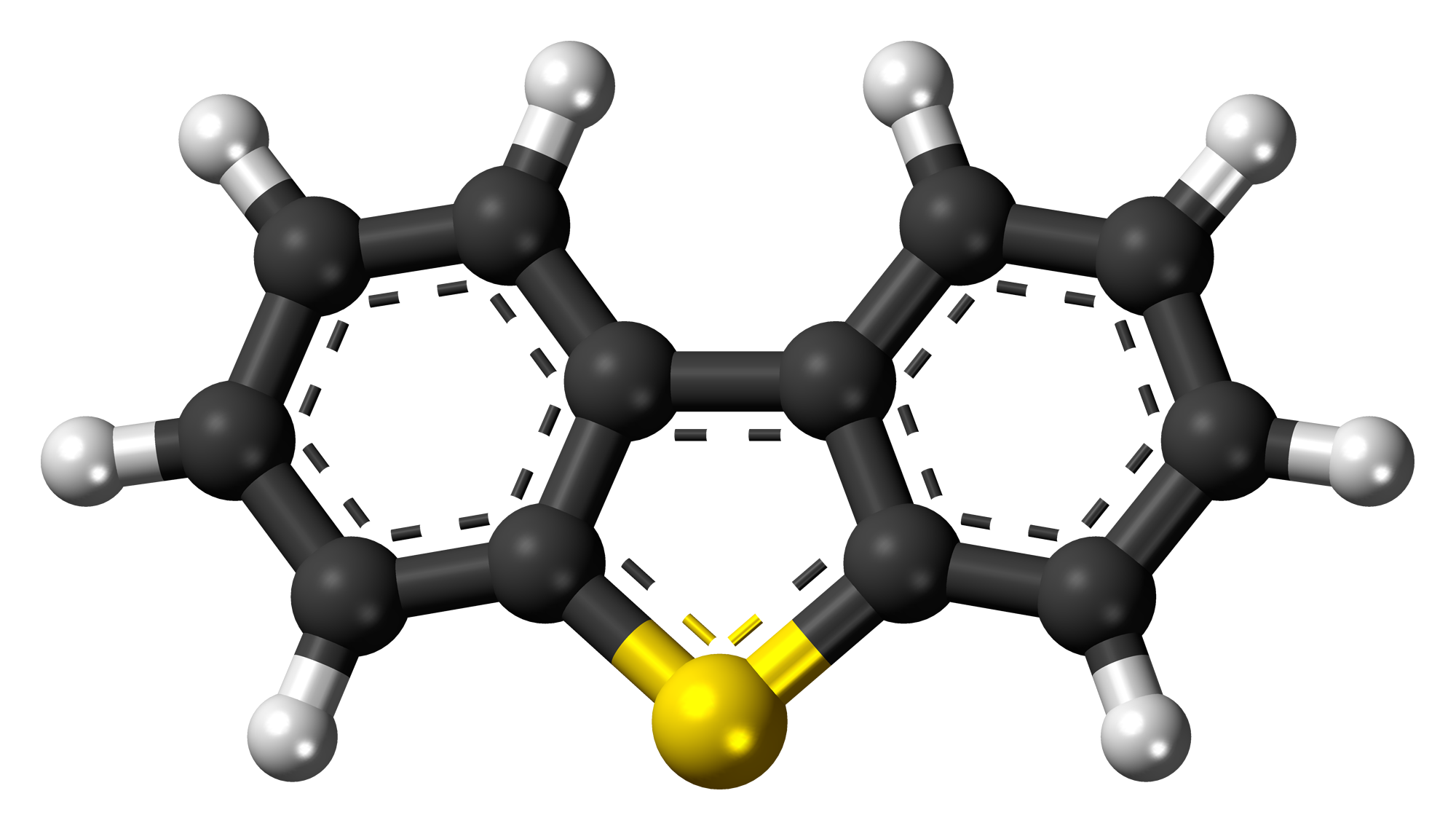

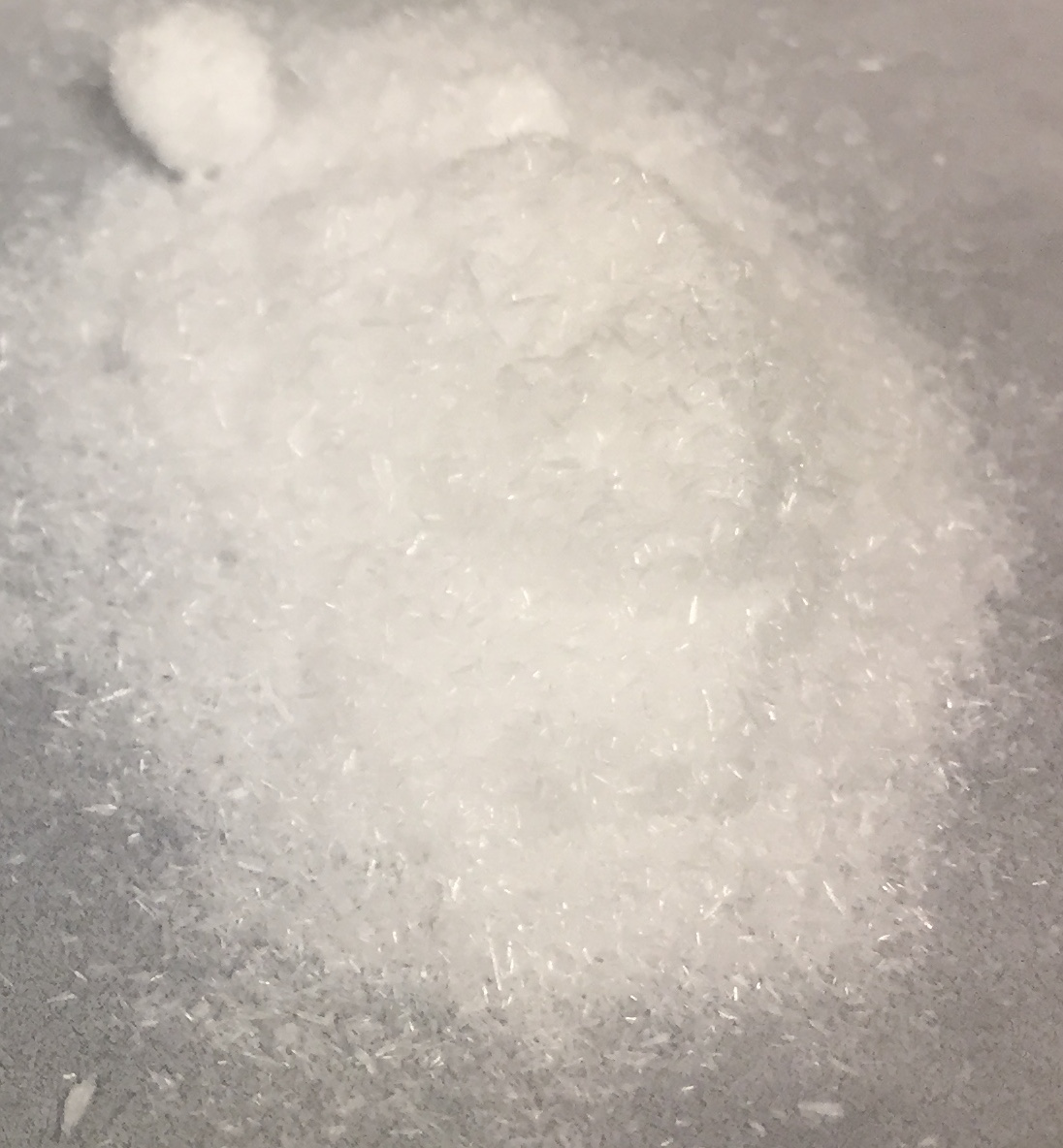

Names
- Preferred IUPAC name Dibenzo[b,d]thiophene
- Other names Diphenylene sulfide, DBT

Identifiers
CAS Number	132-65-0
3D model (JSmol)	Interactive image
ChEBI	CHEBI:23681
ChEMBL	ChEMBL219828
ChemSpider	2915
ECHA InfoCard	100.004.613
EC Number	205-072-9
KEGG	D03777
PubChem CID	3023
RTECS number	HQ3490550
UNII	Z3D4AJ1R48
CompTox Dashboard (EPA)	DTXSID0047741
- InChI: InChI=1S/C12H8S/c1-3-7-11-9(5-1)10-6-2-4-8-12(10)13-11/h1-8H Key: IYYZUPMFVPLQIF-UHFFFAOYSA-N; InChI=1/C12H8S/c1-3-7-11-9(5-1)10-6-2-4-8-12(10)13-11/h1-8H Key: IYYZUPMFVPLQIF-UHFFFAOYAY
- SMILES: c1ccc2c(c1)c3ccccc3s2

Properties
Chemical formula	C_{12}H_{8}S
Molar mass	184.26 g/mol
Appearance	Colourless crystals
Density	1.252 g/cm^{3}
Melting point	97 to 100 °C (207 to 212 °F; 370 to 373 K) (lit.)
Boiling point	332 to 333 °C (630 to 631 °F; 605 to 606 K)
Solubility in water	insol.
Solubility in other solvents	benzene and related

Hazards
- Occupational safety and health (OHS/OSH)
Main hazards	flammable, toxic
- GHS labelling
Pictograms	(GHS06: Toxic) (GHS07: Exclamation mark) (GHS09: Environmental hazard)
Signal word	Danger
Hazard statements	H301, H302, H311, H315, H331, H332, H410
Precautionary statements	P261, P264, P270, P271, P273, P280, P301+P312, P302+P352, P304+P312, P304+P340, P311, P312, P321, P322, P330, P332+P313, P361, P362, P363, P391, P403+P233, P405, P501

Related compounds
Related compounds	Thiophene; Anthracene; Benzothiophene; Dibenzofuran
- Except where otherwise noted, data are given for materials in their standard state (at 25 °C [77 °F], 100 kPa). verify (what is ?) Infobox references

Dibenzothiophene (DBT, diphenylene sulfide) is the organosulfur compound consisting of two benzene rings fused to a central thiophene ring. It has the chemical formula C_{12}H_{8}S. It is a colourless solid that is chemically somewhat similar to anthracene. This tricyclic heterocycle, and especially its disubstituted derivative 4,6-dimethyldibenzothiophene are problematic impurities in petroleum.

== Synthesis and reactions ==
Dibenzothiophene is prepared by the reaction of biphenyl with sulfur dichloride in the presence of aluminium chloride.

Reduction with lithium results in scission of one C-S bond. With butyllithium, this heterocycle undergoes stepwise lithiation at the 4-position. S-oxidation with peroxides gives the sulfoxide.

Dibenzothiophene is electron-rich, and naturally undergoes aromatic substitution para to the sulfide. Oxidation to the sulfoxide or sulfone leaves the compound electron poor, and substitution occurs at the meta position instead.
