= Randy Roach =

American politician

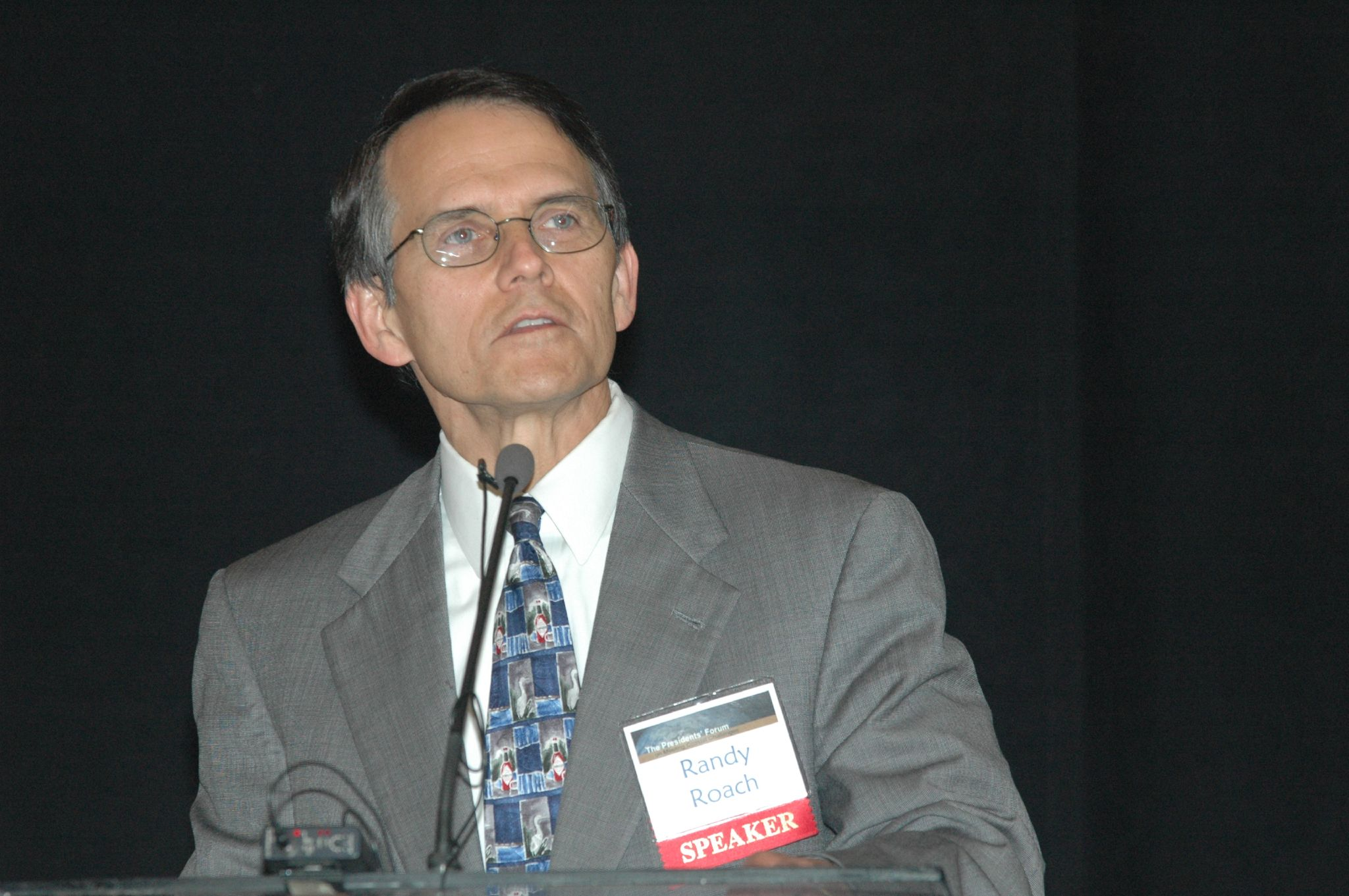
- Roach in 2007

Member of the Louisiana House of Representatives from the 36th district
- In office 1988–1996
- Preceded by: Conway LeBleu
- Succeeded by: Dan Flavin

Mayor of Lake Charles, Louisiana
- In office April 2000 – June 30, 2017
- Preceded by: Rodney Geyem
- Succeeded by: Nicholas E. Hunter

Personal details
- Born: Randall Edmund Roach Lake Charles, Louisiana, U.S.
- Party: Democratic
- Spouse: Nancy Roach
- Children: 2
- Education: Louisiana State University

Randall Edmund Roach is an American politician. He served as a Democratic member for the 36th district of the Louisiana House of Representatives. He was also the mayor of Lake Charles, Louisiana from 2000 to 2017.

Roach attended LaGrange High School, graduating in 1969. He then attended Louisiana State University, where he earned an undergraduate degree in accounting and a Juris Doctor degree. In 1988 Roach was elected for the 36th district of the Louisiana House of Representatives, serving until 1996.

In 2000 Roach was elected as mayor of Lake Charles, Louisiana. He was re-elected four times before deciding not to run for re-election in 2017. June 30, 2017 was declared as "Randy Roach Day" by Lake Charles.

== See also ==
- List of mayors of Lake Charles, Louisiana
