= Kollnburg =

- Municipality
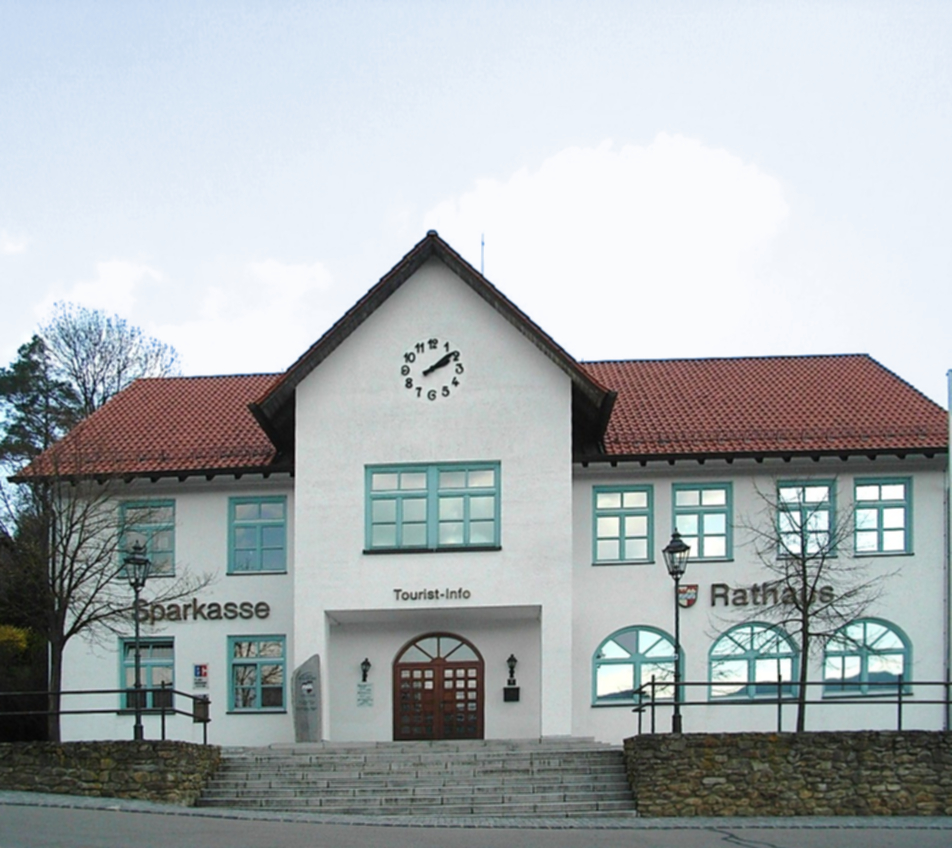
- Town hall

- Coat of arms

- Location of Kollnburg within Regen district
- Interactive map of Kollnburg
- Location within Germany Location within Bavaria
- Coordinates: 49°3′N 12°52′E
- Country: Germany
- State: Bavaria
- Admin. region: Niederbayern
- District: Regen

Government
  - Mayor (2020–26): Herbert Preuß (FW)

Area
  - Total: 59.52 km^{2} (22.98 sq mi)
- Elevation: 655 m (2,149 ft)

Population (2025-12-31)
  - Total: 2,720
  - Density: 45.7/km^{2} (118/sq mi)
- Time zone: UTC+01:00 (CET)
  - Summer (DST): UTC+02:00 (CEST)
- Postal codes: 94262
- Dialling codes: 09942
- Vehicle registration: REG
- Website: www.kollnburg.de

Kollnburg is a municipality in the district of Regen, in Bavaria, Germany. A part of the municipal area, including the parish village of the same name, is a state-approved resort.

== Geography ==
The community is located in the Donau Forest region in the middle of the Bavarian Forest north of the 1050 m high Proeller between Viechtach (five kilometers) and Sankt Englmar (six kilometers). The two towns of Bogen and Regen are each 27 km away, while Deggendorf and Cham are each 31 km away.

== History ==
=== Community Planting ===
The local history is closely connected to its fortress Burgruine Kollnburg, which was first mentioned in 1153 as Chalnberch. It was still called Kalmperg in 1685, while Bernhard Grueber and Adalbert Müller called it Kohlenburg in their book Der Bavarian Forest, published in 1846. In the "Contributions to the Statistics of the Kingdom of Bavaria" the place is already referred to as Kollnburg in issue XXI from 1869.

Kollnburg belonged to the Barons von Kastner. The place was part of the Electorate of Bavaria, but formed a closed Hofmark, whose seat was Kollnburg. In the course of the administrative reforms in Bavaria, today's municipality came into being with the municipal edict.

=== Incorporation ===
In the course of the regional reform in Bavaria, the municipality of Rechertsried was incorporated on October 1, 1971, and the municipalities of Allersdorf and Kirchaitnach on May 1, 1978, incorporated into the municipality of Kollnburg.

=== Population Development ===
Between 1988 and 2018, the population stagnated or fell minimally from 2800 to 2795 by 5 inhabitants or 0.2%.

- 1867: 1027 inhabitants
- 1871: 1060 inhabitants
- 1961: 2764 inhabitants
- 1970: 2695 inhabitants
- 1987: 2786 inhabitants
- 1991: 2838 inhabitants
- 1995: 2905 inhabitants
- 2000: 2970 inhabitants
- 2005: 2891 inhabitants
- 2010: 2894 inhabitants
- 2015: 2787 inhabitants

== Politics ==
=== Municipal Council ===
Since the municipal elections in Bavaria 2014, the municipal council has been composed as follows:

- CSU: 4 seats (33.42% of the votes)
- FW: 5 seats (35.09% of the votes)
- Bürger für Kollnburg: 3 seats (18.76% of the votes)
- GPÖ: 2 seats (12.73% of the votes)

=== Mayor ===
Herbert Preuß (FW) has been the first mayor since May 1, 2020. In the municipal elections in Bavaria 2020, he won the run-off election on March 29, 2020, with 55.1 percent against the previous incumbent Josefa Schmid, who has been the first mayor of Kollnburg since 2008.

=== Coat of Arms ===
white

The municipal coat of arms of Kollnburg combines elements from the family coats of arms of noble families that were important for the history of the municipal area. The white and blue diamonds are reminiscent of both the Kollnburg (Kallenberger, Chalmberger), the first proven family from the 12th to the 14th century in Kollnburg, as well as the Nußberger, who followed the Kollnburg family in 1363 and possessed the castle up to their defeat in the Böckler War of 1468/69. The Kollnburgers and the Nußbergers originally belonged to the Ministerialis of the Counts of Bogen, who died out in 1242, and therefore have their diamonds in their coat of arms. The formal structure of the coat of arms is based on the fact that the Kollnburgers showed diamonds in a split shield while the Nußbergers arranged them in line. The diamonds were passed on to the Wittelsbach family with the Bogen inheritance in 1242 and later became the Bavarian state coat of arms. The crenellation at the top symbolizes the castle Burgruine Kollnburg, which was probably built in the 11th century as the ministerial seat of the Counts of Bogen. This coat of arms has been used since 1983.

== Architectural and archaeological monuments ==
- Burgruine Kollnburg: Castle ruins with round tower and castle fountain
- Burgstall Kollnburg

== Statistics ==
In 1998, according to official statistics, 10 employees in agriculture and forestry, 136 in manufacturing and 17 in trade and transport had an insurable employment. In other sectors of the economy, 137 people had an insurable employment. There were a total of 895 employees in insurable employment. There were no manufacturing companies, and 6 companies in main construction trades. In addition, in 1999 there were 181 farms with an agricultural area of 2735 ha, of which 2178 ha were permanent grasslands.

== Economy and infrastructure ==
=== Tourism ===
The districts of Kollnburg, Bach, Baierweg, Gnad, Hochstrass, Höfen, Hornhof, Kagermühle, Karglhof, Marktbuchen, Oed, Ogleinsmais, Reichsdorf, Reisach, Sattel, Schreinermühle, Steffelhof, Tafertshof, Unterdornach, Waldhof, Weggütl, Wieshof, and Windsprach are state-recognized as resorts.

=== Education ===
There are the following institutions (status: 1999):

- Kindergarten with 75 kindergarten places and 67 children
- A primary school with 5 classes and 8 teachers in the center of Kollnburg

== Personalities ==
- Josef Biebl (* 1959), labor lawyer and judge at the Federal Labour Court
- Florian Pledl (* 1984), accordionist of Da Rocka & da Waitler
