= Arnoldo Penzkofer =

Paraguayan basketball player

Arnoldo "Nene" Penzkofer (1959 in Cambyreta, Itapúa – November 16, 2008 in Asunción) was a Paraguayan basketball player.

At a height of 2.12 m (6 ft 11.5 in), Penzkofer was the tallest Paraguayan basketball player in history and one of the most influential figures in the sport. In his native Itapúa Penzkofer worked as a milkman, and at the age of 18 he was invited to join Club Ciudad Nueva by a scout from that team even though he had never practiced basketball before and was not aware of any of the sport's rules.

Throughout his career, he played for teams like Ciudad Nueva, Olimpia, Sol de América and Deportivo San José in Paraguay, helping all of them capture the Paraguayan championship. He also played for teams in Argentina and Brazil, and was part of the Paraguay national basketball team for several years. He died in November 2008 of a heart attack, at the age of 49.
