= Flavin group =

Group of chemical compounds

Riboflavin, a flavin vitamin

Flavins (from Latin flavus, "yellow") refers generally to the class of organic compounds generally derived from isoalloxazine by varying the R group shown:

Flavins have extensive reduction-oxidation chemistry, and are named for the characteristic yellow color they exhibit in certain oxidation states. Their importance derives from biology: flavins are ubiquitous cofactors for biochemical redox reactions, particularly the electron transport chain.

Despite the lexicographic similarity, flavins are chemically and biologically distinct from the flavanoids and flavonols.

== Redox properties ==
Isoalloxazine is a chemically-aromatic compound with multiple rings and quinone-like oxygenation. It, and the flavins in general, are thus capable of undergoing single-electron oxidation-reduction reactions. Reduction is made with the addition of hydrogen atoms to specific nitrogen atoms on the isoalloxazine ring system:

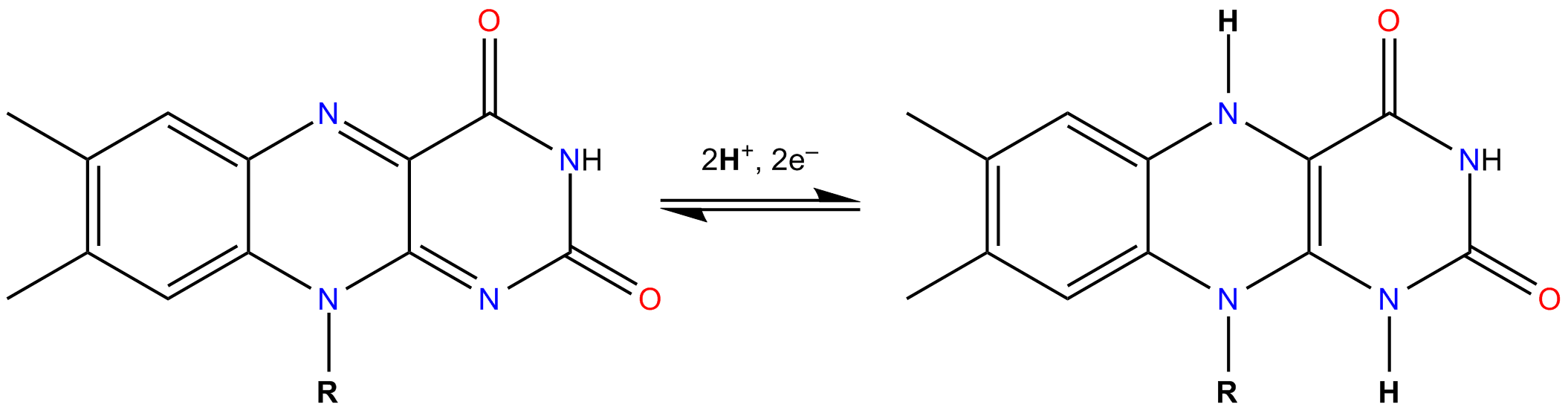
Equilibrium between the oxidized (left) and totally reduced (right) forms of flavin.

In aqueous solution, flavins are yellow-coloured when oxidized, taking a red colour in the semi-reduced anionic state or blue in the neutral (semiquinone) state, and colourless when totally reduced. The oxidized and reduced forms are in fast equilibrium with the semiquinone (radical) form, shifted against the formation of the radical:

Fl_{ox} + Fl_{red}H_{2} ⇌ FlH^{•}

where Fl_{ox} is the oxidized flavin, Fl_{red}H_{2} the reduced flavin (upon addition of two hydrogen atoms) and FlH^{•} the semiquinone form (addition of one hydrogen atom).

=== Photoreduction ===
Both free and protein-bound flavins are photoreducible — that is, able to be reduced by light. The process is mediated by several organic compounds, such as some amino acids, carboxylic acids and amines. This property of flavins is exploited by various light-sensitive proteins. For example, the LOV domain, found in many species of plant, fungi and bacteria, undergoes a reversible, light-dependent structural change which involves the formation of a bond between a cysteine residue in its peptide sequence and a bound FMN.

== In biology ==
The biochemical source of flavin is the yellow B vitamin riboflavin. The flavin moiety is often attached with an adenosine diphosphate to form flavin adenine dinucleotide (FAD); in other circumstances, it is found as flavin mononucleotide (or FMN), a phosphorylated form of riboflavin. It is in one or the other of these forms that flavin is present as a prosthetic group in flavoproteins.

=== FAD, FADH, and FADH_{2} ===
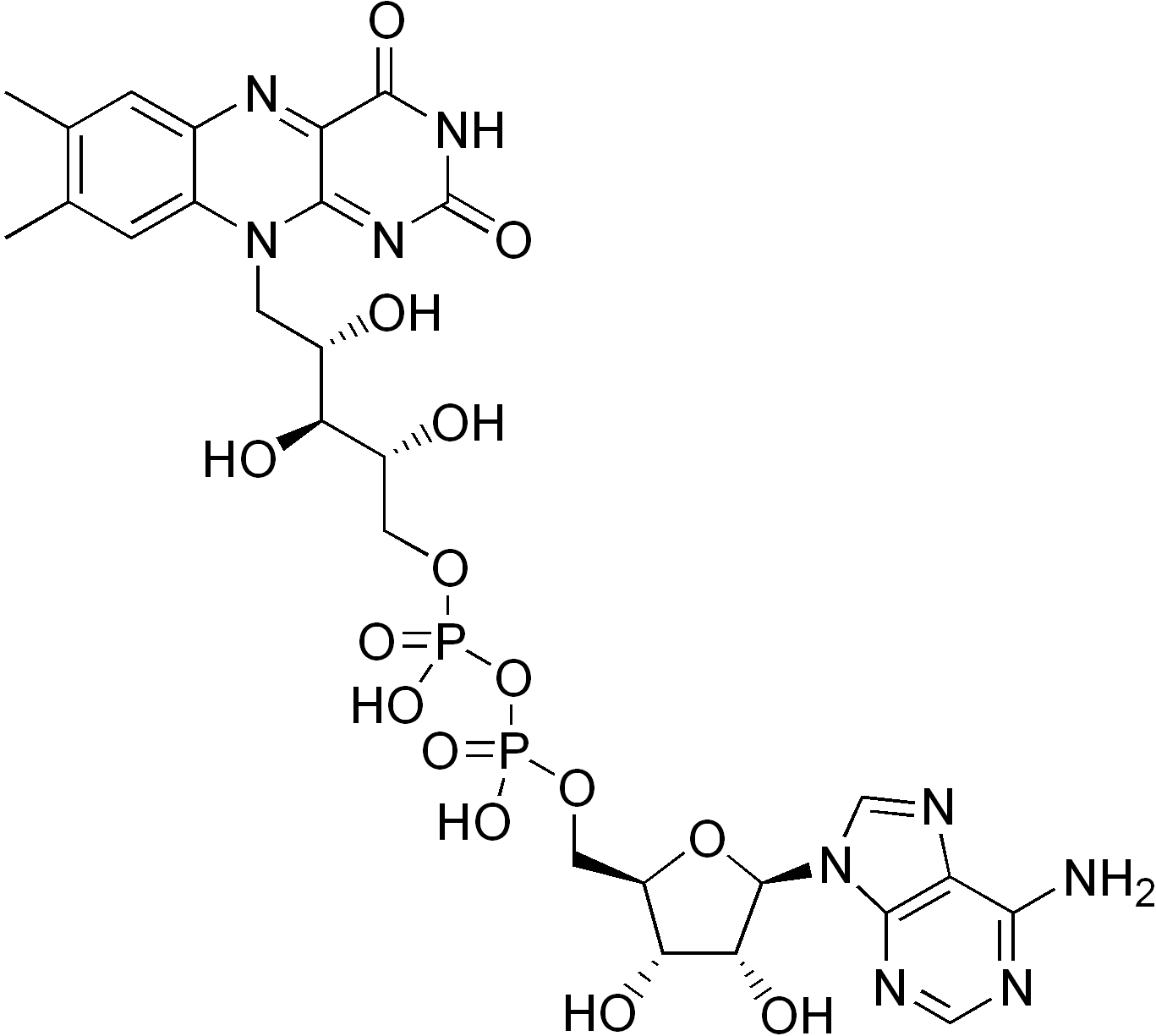
FAD

Flavin adenine dinucleotide is a group bound to many enzymes including ferredoxin-NADP+ reductase, monoamine oxidase, D-amino acid oxidase, glucose oxidase, xanthine oxidase, and acyl CoA dehydrogenase.

FADH and FADH_{2} are reduced forms of FAD. FADH_{2} is produced as a prosthetic group in succinate dehydrogenase, an enzyme involved in the citric acid cycle. In oxidative phosphorylation, two molecules of FADH_{2} typically yield 1.5 ATP each, or three ATP combined.

FADH_{2} is one of the cofactors that can transfer electrons to the electron transfer chain.

=== FMN ===
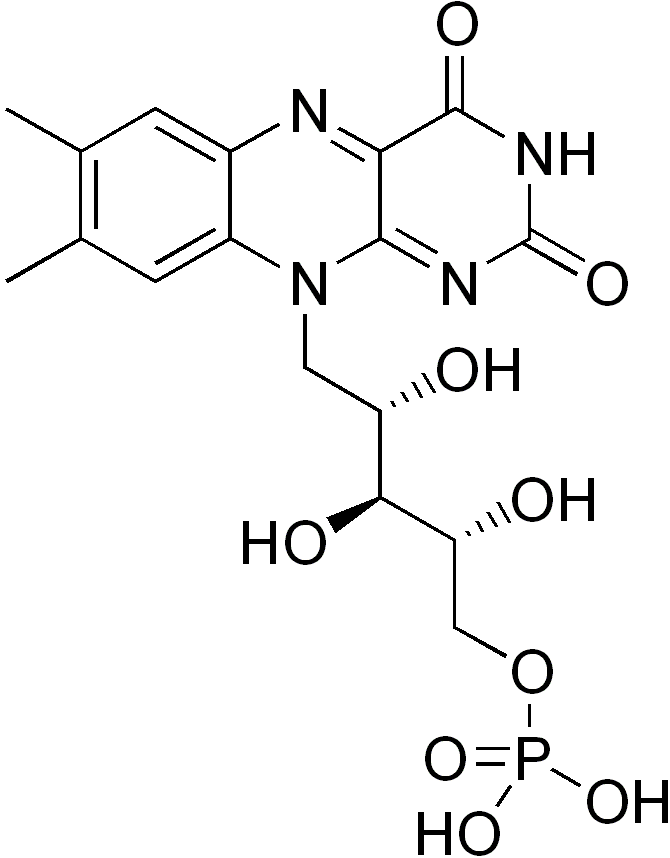
FMN

Flavin mononucleotide is a prosthetic group found in, among other proteins, NADH dehydrogenase, E.coli nitroreductase and old yellow enzyme.

== See also ==
- Pteridine
- Pterin
- Deazaflavin (5-deazaflavin)
