= Flavin mononucleotide =

Coenzyme

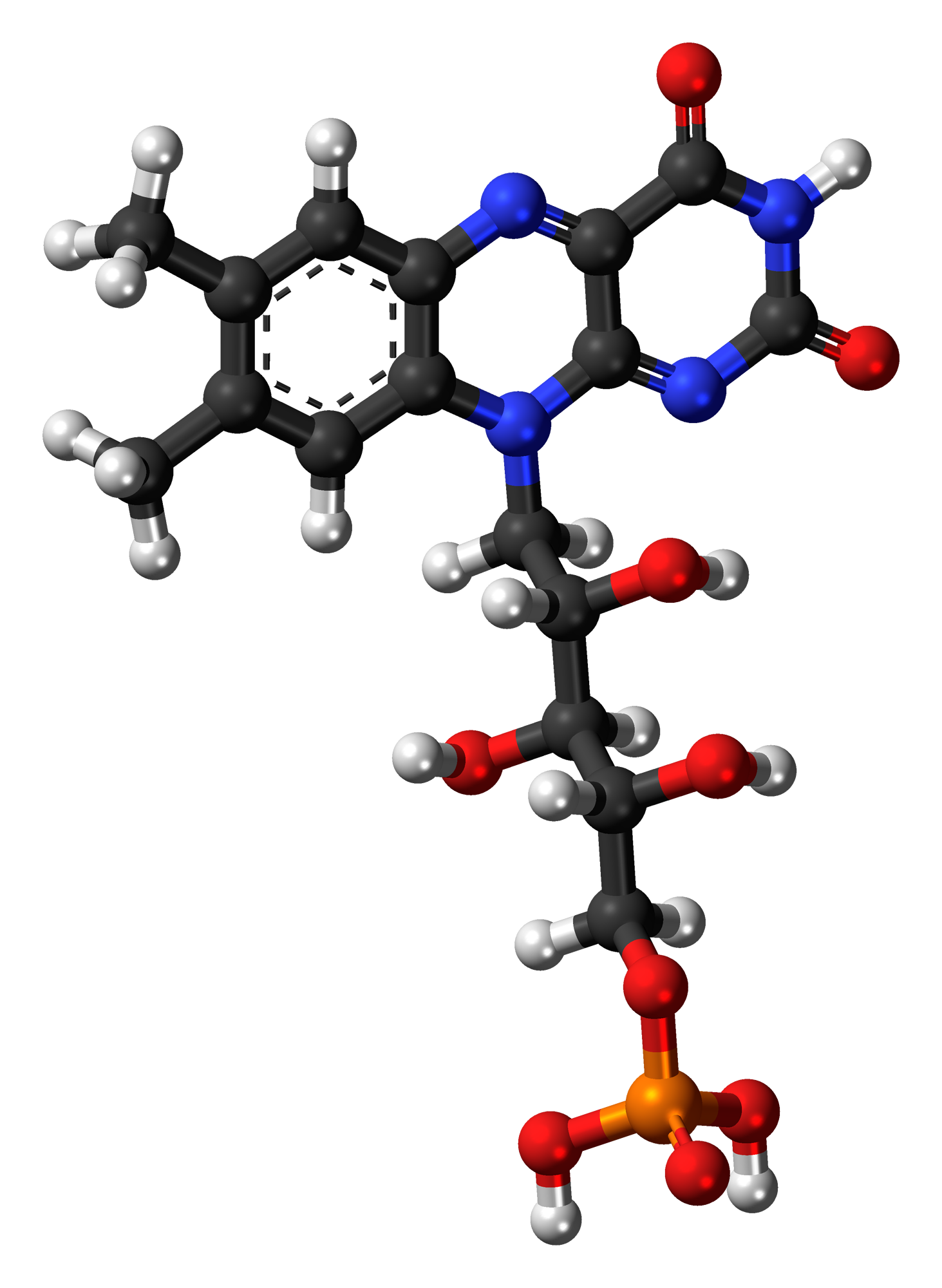

Names
- IUPAC name 1-Deoxy-1-(7,8-dimethyl-2,4-dioxo-3,4-dihydrobenzo[g]pteridin-10(2H)-yl)-D-ribitol 5-(dihydrogen phosphate)
- Systematic IUPAC name (2R,3S,4S)-5-(7,8-Dimethyl-2,4-dioxo-3,4-dihydrobenzo[g]pteridin-10(2H)-yl)-2,3,4-trihydroxypentyl dihydrogen phosphate
- Other names: FMN; Epioxa; Epioxa HD

Identifiers
| CAS Number | 146-17-8; 130-40-5 (sodium salt) |
| 3D model (JSmol) | Interactive image |
| ChEBI | CHEBI:17621 |
| ChEMBL | ChEMBL1201794 |
| ChemSpider | 559060 |
| ECHA InfoCard | 100.005.150 |
| E number | E101a (colours) |
| IUPHAR/BPS | 5185 |
| MeSH | Flavin+mononucleotide |
| PubChem CID | 643976 |
| UNII | 7N464URE7E |
| CompTox Dashboard (EPA) | DTXSID8023559 |
- InChI: InChI=1S/C17H21N4O9P/c1-7-3-9-10(4-8(7)2)21(15-13(18-9)16(25)20-17(26)19-15)5-11(22)14(24)12(23)6-30-31(27,28)29/h3-4,11-12,14,22-24H,5-6H2,1-2H3,(H,20,25,26)(H2,27,28,29)/t11-,12+,14-/m0/s1 Key: FVTCRASFADXXNN-SCRDCRAPSA-N
- SMILES: Cc1cc2c(cc1C)n(c-3nc(=O)[nH]c(=O)c3n2)C[C@@H]([C@@H]([C@@H](COP(=O)(O)O)O)O)O

Properties
| Chemical formula | C_{17}H_{21}N_{4}O_{9}P |
| Molar mass | 456.344 g/mol |
| Melting point | 195 °C |

Pharmacology
| ATC code | S01XA26 (WHO) |
| Routes of administration | Ophthalmic |
| Legal status | US: ℞-only |
- Except where otherwise noted, data are given for materials in their standard state (at 25 °C [77 °F], 100 kPa). Infobox references

Flavin mononucleotide (FMN), or riboflavin-5′-phosphate, sold under the brand name Epioxa, is a biomolecule produced from riboflavin (vitamin B_{2}) by the enzyme riboflavin kinase and functions as the prosthetic group of various oxidoreductases, including NADH dehydrogenase, as well as a cofactor in biological blue-light photo receptors. During the catalytic cycle, various oxidoreductases induce reversible interconversions between the oxidized (FMN), semiquinone (FMNH^{•}), and reduced (FMNH_{2}) forms of the isoalloxazine core. FMN is a stronger oxidizing agent than NAD and is particularly useful because it can take part in both one- and two-electron transfers. In its role as blue-light photo receptor, (oxidized) FMN stands out from the 'conventional' photo receptors as the signaling state and not an E/Z isomerization.

FMN is called a mononucleotide because it consists of the nitrogenous base flavin, the pentose alcohol ribitol, and a phosphate group.

FMN is the principal form in which riboflavin is found in cells and tissues. It requires more energy to produce, but is more soluble than riboflavin. In cells, it occurs freely circulating but also in several covalently bound forms. Covalently or non-covalently bound FMN is a cofactor of many enzymes playing an important pathophysiological role in cellular metabolism. For example dissociation of flavin mononucleotide from mitochondrial complex I has been shown to occur during ischemia/reperfusion brain injury during stroke.

== Food additive ==
Flavin mononucleotide is also used as an orange-red food colour additive, designated in Europe as E number E101.

E106, a very closely related food dye, is riboflavin-5′-phosphate sodium salt, which consists mainly of the monosodium salt of the 5′-monophosphate ester of riboflavin. It is rapidly turned to free riboflavin after ingestion. It is found in many foods for babies and young children as well as jams, milk products, and sweets and sugar products.

== Medical uses ==
Flavin mononucleotide
Clinical data
- AHFS/Drugs.com: Epioxa
- License data: US DailyMed: Riboflavin 5

Identifiers
- DrugBank: DB03247
- E number: E101a (colours)
- CompTox Dashboard (EPA): DTXSID8023559
- ECHA InfoCard: 100.005.150

FMN is a part of mitochondrial complex I and is released upon reverse electron transfer along the respiratory chain, a phenomenon observed during ischemia-reperfusion injury (IRI). IRI is of particular relevance in solid organ transplantation, where grafts inevitably undergo a period of ischemia following procurement and then experience re-oxygenation upon implantation into the recipient. FMN release into the blood has been shown to correlate with irreversible mitochondrial damage and thus the extent of IRI, establishing it as a biomarker for assessment of IRI in the context of solid organ transplantation.

Owing to its native fluorescent properties (excitation peak at 405 nm and emission peak at 530 nm) FMN can be quantified non-invasively and continuously within biological fluids without requiring sample collection or laboratory processing. This capability was leveraged for assessment of grafts that undergo machine perfusion prior to transplantation. To date, the majority of evidence supporting FMN as a surrogate marker of transplant outcome derives from liver grafts assessed during hypothermic machine perfusion (HOPE), prior to transplantation. Here, FMN concentrations were measured in perfusate during HOPE, either by sampling perfusate every 30 minutes and performing a lab analysis, or by using real-time sensors that were attached to the perfusion tubing. Lower FMN release during ex situ perfusion correlated with improved transplant outcomes, including fewer non-anastomotic strictures and reduced rates of primary non-function (PNF), lower post-transplant transaminase levels, and higher hepatic synthetic function.

Riboflavin 5'-phosphate (Epioxa) and riboflavin 5'-phosphate sodium (Epioxa HD) and are photoenhancers that are indicated for use in epithelium-on corneal collagen cross-linking for the treatment of keratoconus in people aged thirteen years of age and older, in conjunction with the O2n System and the Boost Goggles.

Flavin mononucleotide, or riboflavin-5'-phosphate, is a biomolecule produced from riboflavin by the enzyme riboflavin kinase and functions as prosthetic group of various oxidoreductases including NADH dehydrogenase as well as cofactor in biological blue-light photo receptors. Riboflavin 5'-phosphate sodium is a mixture of the sodium salts of riboflavin, riboflavin monophosphates, and riboflavin diphosphates.

Epioxa and Epioxa HD were approved for medical use in the United States in October 2025.

== See also ==
- Flavin adenine dinucleotide
