= Outline of Louisiana =

Overview of and topical guide to Louisiana

The flag of Louisiana

The seal of Louisiana

The location of the state of Louisiana in the United States of America

The following outline is provided as an overview of and topical guide to the U.S. state of Louisiana:

Louisiana – U.S. state located in the southern region of the United States of America. Louisiana is the only state in the U.S. with political subdivisions termed parishes, which are local governments equivalent to counties. Some Louisiana urban environments have a strong multicultural and multilingual heritage, influenced by an admixture of 18th century French, Spanish, Native American (Indian) and African inhabitants.

== General reference ==
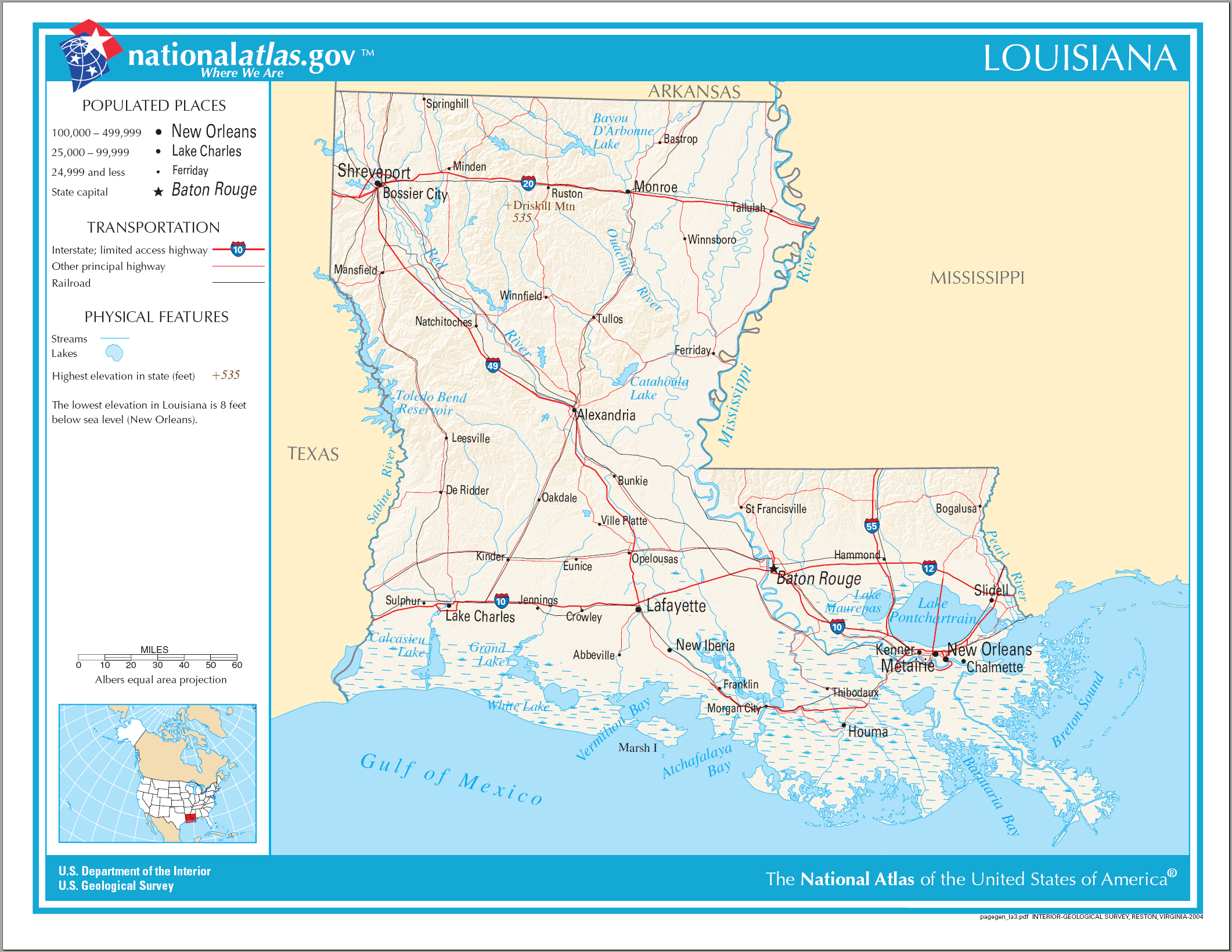
An enlargeable map of the state of Louisiana

- Names
  - Common name: Louisiana
    - Pronunciation: /luˌiːziˈænə/, /ˌluːziˈænə/
  - Official name: State of Louisiana
  - Abbreviations and name codes
    - Postal symbol: LA
    - ISO 3166-2 code: US-LA
    - Internet second-level domain: .la.us
  - Nicknames
    - Bayou State (previously used on license plates)
    - Child of the Mississippi
    - Creole State
    - Fisherman's Paradise
    - Holland of America
    - Pelican State
    - Sportsman's Paradise (currently used on license plates)
    - Sugar State
- Adjectival: Louisiana
- Demonym: Louisianian

== Geography of Louisiana ==
Geography of Louisiana

- Louisiana is: a U.S. state, a federal state of the United States of America
- Location
  - Northern Hemisphere
  - Western Hemisphere
    - Americas
      - North America
        - Anglo America
        - Northern America
          - United States of America
            - Contiguous United States
              - Central United States
                - West South Central States
              - Western United States
              - Southern United States
              - Black Belt
                - Deep South
                  - Gulf Coast of the United States
                - South Central United States
- Population of Louisiana: 4,533,372 (2010 U.S. Census)
- Area of Louisiana: 52,271 sq mi (135,382 km^{2})
- Atlas of Louisiana

=== Places in Louisiana ===
- Historic places in Louisiana
  - National Historic Landmarks in Louisiana
  - National Register of Historic Places listings in Louisiana
    - Bridges on the National Register of Historic Places in Louisiana
- National Natural Landmarks in Louisiana
- National parks in Louisiana
- State parks in Louisiana

=== Environment of Louisiana ===
- Climate of Louisiana
- Protected areas in Louisiana
  - State forests of Louisiana
- Superfund sites in Louisiana

==== Natural geographic features of Louisiana ====
- Rivers of Louisiana

=== Regions of Louisiana ===
- Central Louisiana
- Southwestern Louisiana

==== Administrative divisions of Louisiana ====
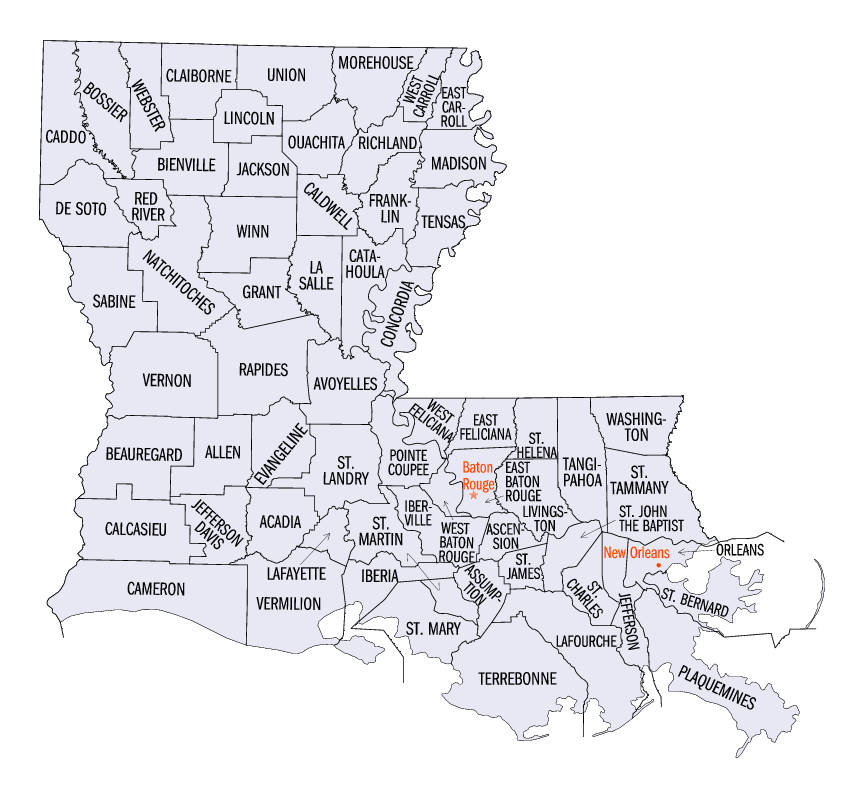
An enlargeable map of the 64 parishes of the state of Louisiana

- The 64 parishes of the state of Louisiana
  - Municipalities in Louisiana
    - Cities in Louisiana
      - State capital of Louisiana:
      - City nicknames in Louisiana
    - Towns in Louisiana
  - Census-designated places in Louisiana

=== Demography of Louisiana ===
Demographics of Louisiana

== Geology of Louisiana ==
- Brown Dense oil and gas play
- Louisiana Geological Survey
- Haynesville Shale oil and gas play
- Paleontology in Louisiana

== Government and politics of Louisiana ==
Politics of Louisiana

- Form of government: U.S. state government
- Louisiana's congressional delegations
- Louisiana State Capitol
- Elections in Louisiana
- Political party strength in Louisiana

=== Branches of the government of Louisiana ===
Government of Louisiana

==== Executive branch of the government of Louisiana ====
- Governor of Louisiana
  - Lieutenant Governor of Louisiana
  - Secretary of State of Louisiana
- State departments
  - Louisiana Department of Transportation

==== Legislative branch of the government of Louisiana ====
- Louisiana State Legislature (bicameral)
  - Upper house: Louisiana Senate
  - Lower house: Louisiana House of Representatives

==== Judicial branch of the government of Louisiana ====
Courts of Louisiana

- Supreme Court of Louisiana

=== Law and order in Louisiana ===
Law of Louisiana

- Cannabis in Louisiana
- Capital punishment in Louisiana
  - Individuals executed in Louisiana
- Constitution of Louisiana
- Crime in Louisiana
- Gun laws in Louisiana
- Law enforcement in Louisiana
  - Law enforcement agencies in Louisiana
    - Louisiana State Police
- Same-sex marriage in Louisiana

=== Military in Louisiana ===
- Louisiana Air National Guard
- Louisiana Army National Guard

== History of Louisiana ==
History of Louisiana

=== History of Louisiana, by period ===
- Poverty Point culture, 2200 - 700 BCE
- Tchefuncte culture, 600 BCE - 200 CE
- Marksville culture, 100 BCE to 400 CE
- Fourche Maline culture, 300 BCE to 800 CE
- Baytown culture, 300 to 700 CE
- Coles Creek culture, 700 - 1200
- Plaquemine culture, 1200–1400
- Caddoan Mississippian culture, 800 - 1600
- Native groups at time of European settlement
- Spanish colony of Florida, 1565–1763
  - Treaty of Paris of 1763
- French colony of Louisiane, 1699–1764
  - History of slavery in Louisiana, 1706–1865
  - Treaty of Fontainebleau of 1762
- Spanish colony of Tejas, (1721–1773)-1821
  - Los Adaes, 1721–1773
- British Province of West Florida, 1763–1783
  - Treaty of Paris of 1783
- Spanish (though predominantly Francophone) district of Baja Luisiana, 1764–1803
  - Rebellion of 1768
  - Third Treaty of San Ildefonso of 1800
- Spanish colony of Florida Occidental, 1783–1821
  - Republic of West Florida, 1810
- French district of Basse-Louisiane, 1803
  - Louisiana Purchase of 1803
- Unorganized territory of the United States, 1803–1804
- Territory of Orleans, 1804–1812
  - Sabine Free State, 1806–1821
  - U.S. unilaterally annexes Florida Parishes, 1810
- History of Louisiana#Incorporation into the United States and antebellum years (1803–1860) since April 30, 1812
  - War of 1812, 1812–1815
    - Battle of New Orleans, 1815
  - Adams-Onis Treaty of 1819
  - Louisiana in the American Civil War, 1861–1865
    - Confederate States of America, 1861–1865
  - Louisiana in Reconstruction, 1865–1868
  - Hurricane Katrina, 2005

=== History of Louisiana, by region ===
- by city
  - History of New Orleans
    - New Orleans in the American Civil War
  - History of Baton Rouge
  - History of Shreveport
  - History of Metairie, Louisiana
- by parish
  - History of Orleans Parish, Louisiana (Orleans Parish has the same boundaries as the city of New Orleans)
  - History of Jefferson Parish, Louisiana

=== History of Louisiana, by subject ===
- List of Louisiana state legislatures
- History of slavery in Louisiana

== Culture of Louisiana ==
Culture of Louisiana

- Museums in Louisiana
- Religion in Louisiana
  - The Church of Jesus Christ of Latter-day Saints in Louisiana
  - Episcopal Diocese of Louisiana
- Scouting in Louisiana
- State symbols of Louisiana
  - Flag of the State of Louisiana
  - Great Seal of the State of Louisiana

=== The arts in Louisiana ===
- Music of Louisiana
- Theater in Louisiana

=== Sports in Louisiana ===
Sports in Louisiana

== Economy and infrastructure of Louisiana ==
Economy of Louisiana

- Communications in Louisiana
  - Newspapers in Louisiana
  - Radio stations in Louisiana
  - Television stations in Louisiana
- Health care in Louisiana
  - Hospitals in Louisiana
- Transportation in Louisiana
  - Airports in Louisiana
  - Roads in Louisiana
    - State highways in Louisiana

== Education in Louisiana ==
Education in Louisiana

- Schools in Louisiana
  - School districts in Louisiana
    - High schools in Louisiana
  - Colleges and universities in Louisiana
    - University of Louisiana (disambiguation)
    - Louisiana State University

== See also ==
- Topic overview:
  - Louisiana
  - Index of Louisiana-related articles
