= List of Louisiana state symbols =

Location of the state of Louisiana in the United States of America

This is a list of official symbols of the U.S. state of Louisiana. Official symbols of Louisiana are codified in the laws of Louisiana.

== State symbols ==
Seal of Louisiana
LL 151, 1902

Flag of Louisiana
1912

Route markers of Louisiana

| Type | Symbol | Law | Notes |
|---|---|---|---|
| Amphibian | Green tree frog (Hyla cinerea) | LL 169.1, 1993 | |
| Beverage | Milk | LL 170, 1983 | |
| Bird | Brown pelican (Pelecanus occidentalis) | LL 159, 1958 | |
| Butterfly | Gulf fritillary (Dione vanillae) | LL 164.1, 2022 | |
| Colors | Blue, white, gold | LL 161, 1972 | |
| Crustacean | Crawfish | LL 168, 1983 | |
| Dog | Catahoula leopard dog | LL 165, 1979 | |
| Fish | White perch | LL 170.4, 1993 | |
| Flower | Magnolia | LL 154, 1900 | |
| Fossil | Petrified palmwood | LL 162, 1976 | |
| Fruit | Strawberry (Fragaria) | LL 166, 1980 | |
| Gemstone | Crassostrea virginica oyster shell (previously agate 1976–2011) | LL 163, 2011 | |
| Mineral | Agate | LL 163.1, 2011 | |
| Insect | Honeybee (Apis mellifera) | LL 164, 1977 | |
| Jelly | Mayhaw jelly and Louisiana sugar cane jelly | LL 170.8, 2003 | |
| Mammal | Louisiana black bear (Ursus americanus luteolus) | LL 161.1, 1992 | |
| Meat pie | Natchitoches meat pie | LL 170.9, 2003 | |
| Motto | "Union, justice and confidence" | LL 151, 1902 | |
| Musical instrument | Diatonic accordion, also known as the Cajun accordion | LL 155.3, 1990 | |
| Reptile | American alligator (Alligator mississippiensis) | LL 169, 1983 | |
| Slogan | "Feed Your Soul" | Official | |
| Song | "You Are My Sunshine" and "Give Me Louisiana" | LL 155, 1970 | |
| Song — environmental | "The Gifts of Earth" | LL 155.2, 1990 | |
| Song — march | "Louisiana My Home Sweet Home" | LL 155.1, 1952 | |
| Steam locomotive | Southern Pacific 745 | LL 191.1, 2022 | Legislation vaguely made the 2-8-2 wheel arrangement the official state locomotive, but this specifically honors the historic significance of SP 745, being the last surviving locomotive built in the state. |
| Tartan | Louisiana Tartan | LL 170.6, 2001 | |
| Tree | Bald cypress (Taxodium distichum) | LL 160, 1963 | |
| Vegetable | Sweet potato (Pomona Batista) | LL 170.11, 2003 | |
| Vegetable plant | Creole tomato | LL 170.11, 2003 | |
| Wildflower | Louisiana iris (Iris giganticaerulea) | LL 154.1, 1990 | |

== State oath ==
- State pledge :

I pledge allegiance to the flag of the state of Louisiana and to the motto for which it stands: A state, under God, united in purpose and ideals, confident that justice shall prevail for all of those abiding here.

LL 167, 1981

== State poems ==
- State judicial poem, written by Sylvia Davidson Lott Buckley, and entitled, "America, We The People":

America
We the people
Justice, the word most sought by all, seek God to bless the courts with truth, for through His wisdom we rise or fall.
America
We the people
Do honor this great lady fair, who with her mighty arms still holds, the scales of Justice for all to share.
America
We the people
Do offer threads of hope to all, for Justice covers everyone; she does not measure, short or tall.
America
We the people
Boldly make this pledge to thee, that Justice will, in mind and heart, guide each destiny.
America
We............the...........people.

LL 155.4, 1995

- State Senate poem, written by Jean McGivney Boese and entitled "Leadership":

It is easy to bend with the wind and be weak,
Wrapped in silence when it would take courage to speak,
To do nothing when crises demand that you act;
To prefer a delusion to unpleasant fact.
But the easy evasions that dreamers embrace
Are denied to a leader with problems to face.
He must cope with the world as he finds it, and plan
To make each hard decision as well as he can.
He can't hide from the truth or deny what is real.
Though a lie might assuage all the fears people feel.
For the truth is the truth, and no lie can prevail.
In a world that is real, one must face truth or fail.

LL 155.5, 1999

== See also ==
- List of Louisiana-related topics
- Louisiana flag
- Lists of United States state insignia
- State of Louisiana
- Fleur-de-lis
