= Flag of Louisiana =

U.S. state flag

Louisiana
- Other names: Louisiana flag, Pelican flag
- Use: Civil and state flag
- Proportion: 7∶11
- Adopted: July 1, 1912; 114 years ago (modifications in 2006 and 2010)
- Design: On a blue field, a white pelican tearing its breast to feed its young, displaying three drops of blood, with a white ribbon below bearing the state motto "Union Justice Confidence" in blue lettering.

The flag of the U.S. state of Louisiana consists of a rectangular field of blue with the arms of Louisiana, a pelican vulning herself, in white in the center, with a ribbon beneath, also in white, containing in blue the state motto: "Union Justice Confidence". The flag was officially adopted July 1, 1912, and is often referred to as the Pelican flag.

== Statute ==
The 2024 Louisiana Revised Statutes, RS 49:153(A) defines that the flag shall consist of:

...a solid blue field with the coat-of-arms of the state, the pelican tearing its breast to feed its young, in white in the center, with a ribbon beneath, also in white, containing in blue the motto of the state, "Union, Justice and Confidence", the whole showing as below. The design…shall include an appropriate display of three drops of blood.

== History ==
As early as 1812, the brown pelican appeared on the Louisiana state seal, various militia company colors, and uniform buttons, including on a flag with a blue field and the phrase "Union, Justice and Confidence".

=== First flag ===
On February 11, 1861, the state adopted a flag with a pale yellow star in a red canton and thirteen blue, white, and red stripes. The first flag was used until the end of the Civil War. The flag represented the 13 stripes of the U.S. flag, along with the red, white, and blue of the French tricolor and the yellow and red of the Spanish flag.

1861 state flag proposal	1861 state flag proposal	Official state flag (1861–1865)

=== 1912 Flag ===
18 star American flag flown to commemorate Louisiana's readmission to the Union after the Civil War, c.1876

In 1878, after the end of Reconstruction in Louisiana, the pre-Civil War flag with a white pelican on a blue field came into common use; however, it was not designated as the state's official flag by an act of the legislature.

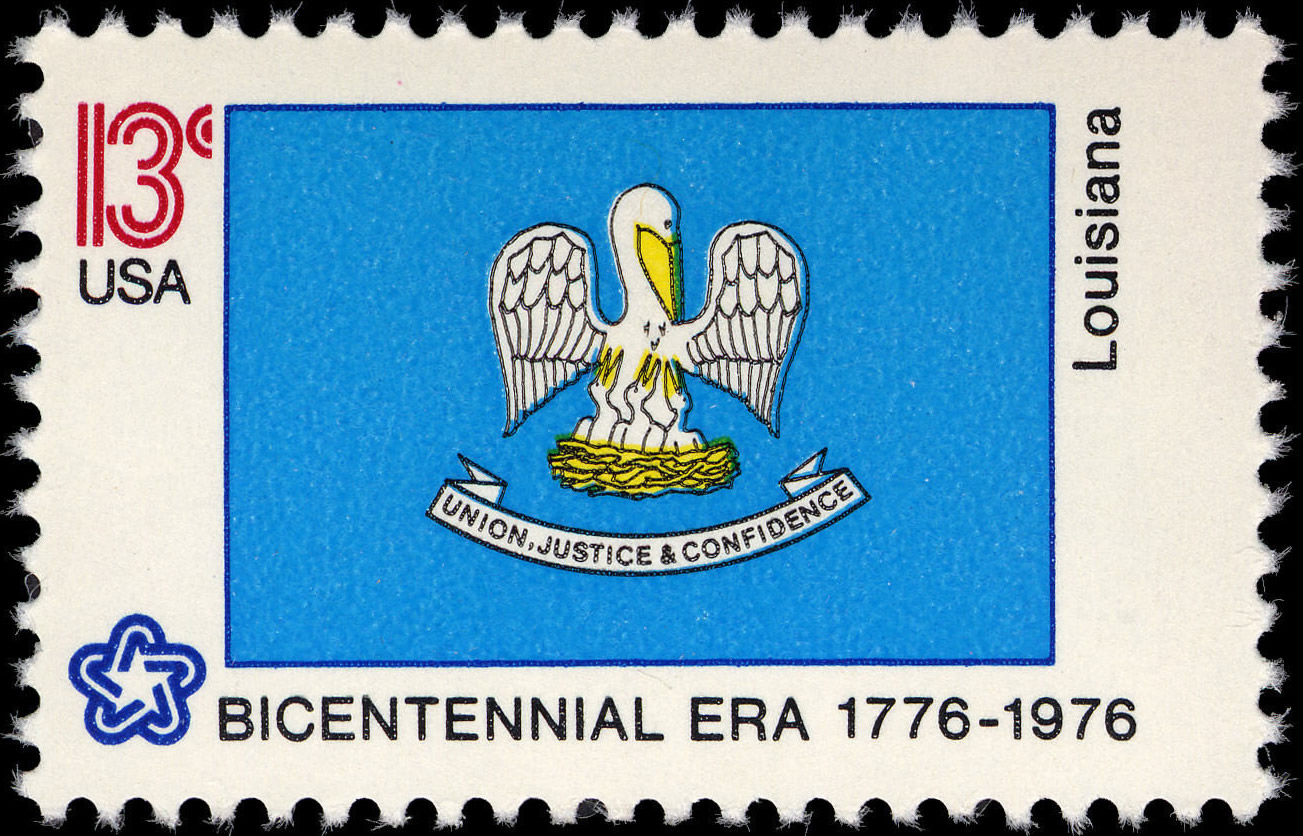
The Louisiana state flag as depicted in the 1976 bicentennial postage stamp series

On June 5, 1912, Rep. William F. Roy of St. Bernard Parish introduced legislation adopting "that flag now in general use" as the state's official flag. The bill was drafted by W. O. Hart of the Louisiana Historical Society, which had endorsed the idea in April 1912. The flag was described at the time as "a solid blue field with the coat of arms of the State, the pelican feeding its young, in white in the center, with a ribbon beneath, also in white, containing in blue the motto of the State, 'Union, justice and confidence'". The bill passed the Louisiana House of Representatives on June 13 by a vote of 71–1. The state Senate followed suit on June 28, approving the measure 32–0. However, beyond stating that the pelican be rendered "in white", the 1912 law did not specify details about the design of the pelican, its number of chicks, or other details, which led to variations in the bird's appearance over the years. Even the shade of blue for the flag varied.

=== 21st-century standardization ===
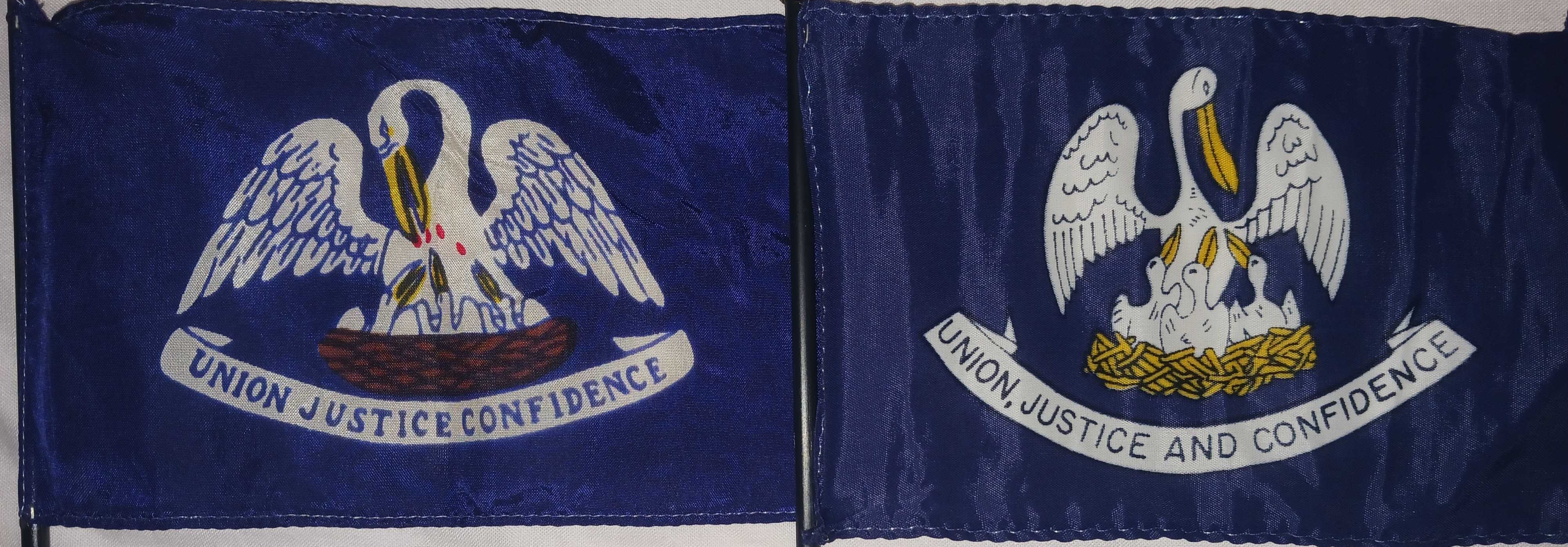
Two vintage examples of state flags produced prior to 2006; note the differences in art style and one lacking the blood drops.

During the 19th century, it was traditional on the state flag and seal for the pelican in her piety to have three drops of blood on her chest. In later years, however, the tradition (on both the state flag and seal) was haphazardly followed, which was noticed by an eighth-grader at Vandebilt Catholic High School in Houma, who brought this to the attention of his state legislator.

On May 25, 2006, a law was enacted requiring the flag to include "an appropriate display of three drops of blood" on the pelican's breast; however, it wasn't until November 22, 2010, that a formal redesign of the flag with standardized imagery was formally introduced. Baton Rouge artist Curtis Vann Jr., who was hired to design a standardized pelican for the updated flag, used a more realistic depiction of a brown pelican for his design, although rendered in white as required by law, but he also incorporated the brown pelican's yellow–brown crown. The design also specified an azure field and removed "and" from the banner beneath the pelican's nest.

In a 2001 survey conducted by the North American Vexillological Association, Louisiana's Flag ranked 36th out of the 72 U.S. state, territories, and Canadian province Flags that were surveyed.

State flag (1912–2006)	State flag (2006–2010)	State flag (2010–present)

== Symbolism ==
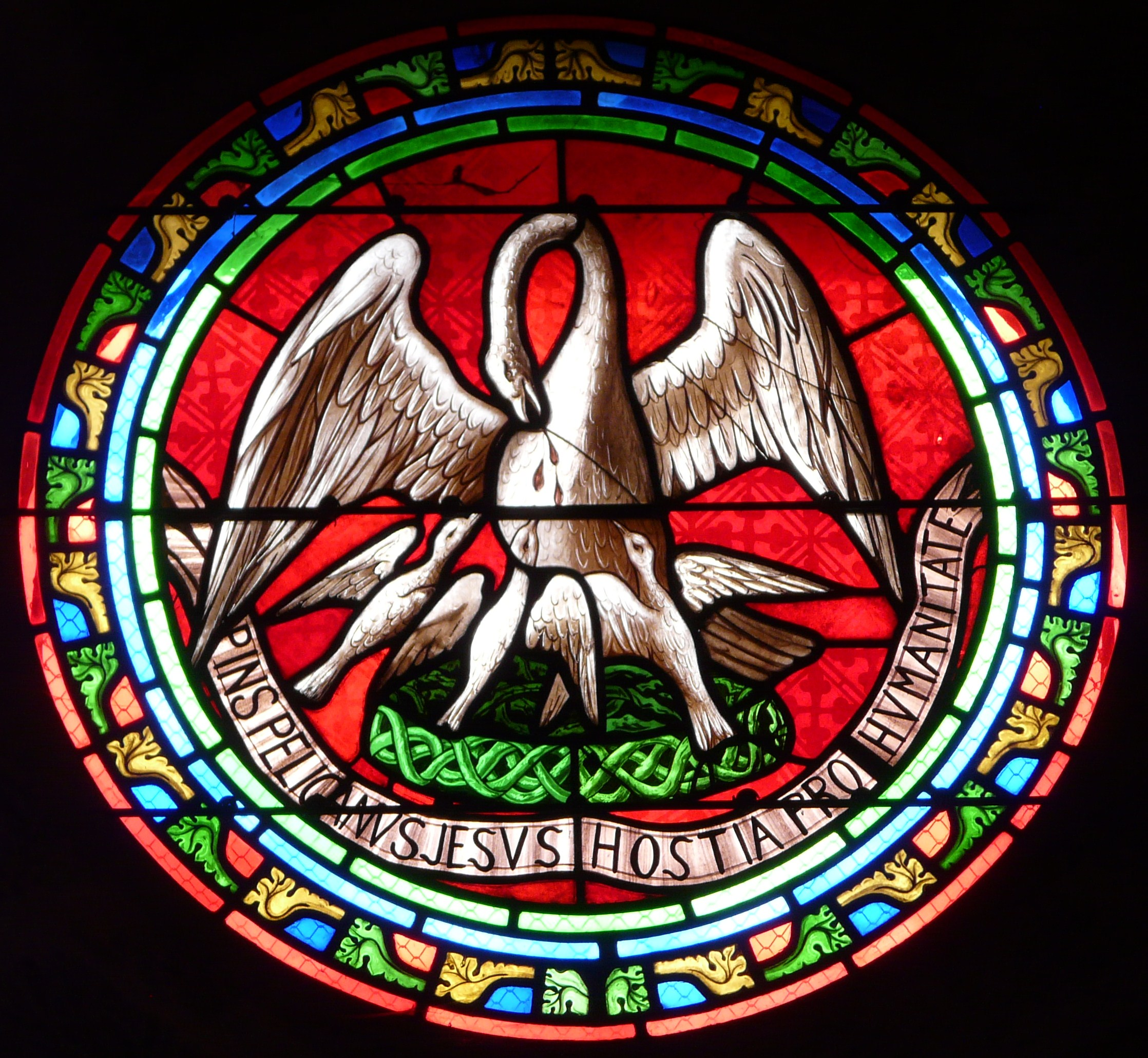
Stained glass depiction of The Pelican in Her Piety from a Catholic church in Saint-Bonnet-la-Rivière, France.

In medieval lore, pelicans were believed to be attentive to the needs of their chicks to the point of drawing their own blood to feed their chicks when no other food was available. This image of the pelican in her piety came to symbolize the Passion of Jesus and the Eucharist.

William C. C. Claiborne, the first governor of the Orleans Territory, selected a pelican for the territory's first seal and it was a common state symbol prior to being formally adopted in 1912 as part of the state flag.

== Pledge of allegiance ==
The Louisiana Pledge of Allegiance, adopted in 1981, is as follows:

"I pledge allegiance to the flag of the state of Louisiana and to the motto for which it stands: A state, under God, united in purpose and ideals, confident that justice shall prevail for all of those abiding here."

== See also ==
- List of flags of Louisiana
- List of flags by design
- List of Louisiana state symbols
- List of U.S. state, district, and territorial insignia
