= Haynesville Shale =

Rock formation in the USA

Coordinates: 32.1159°N 93.6081°W

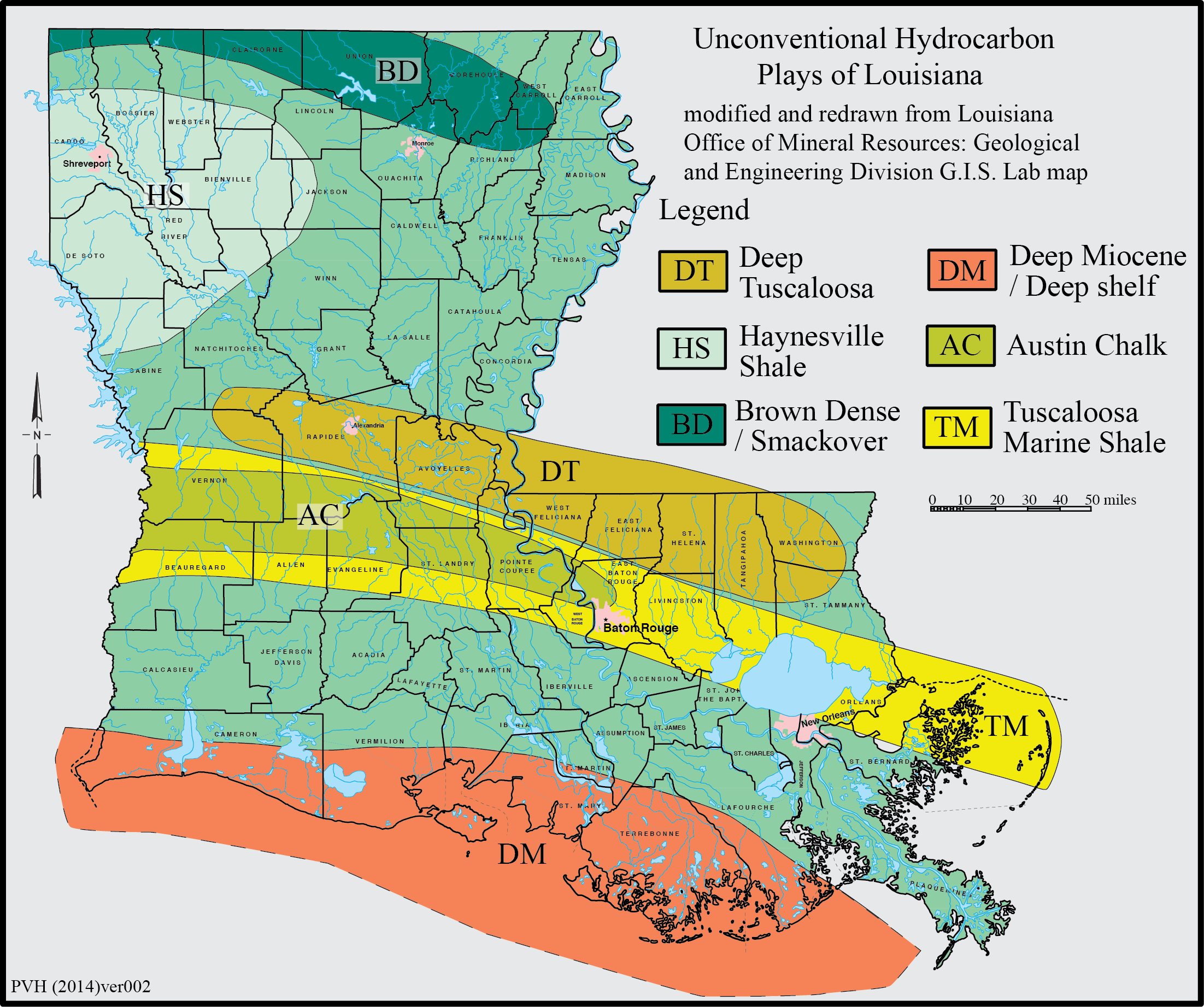
Map showing distribution of Haynesville Shale and other Unconventional Hydrocarbon Plays within Louisiana

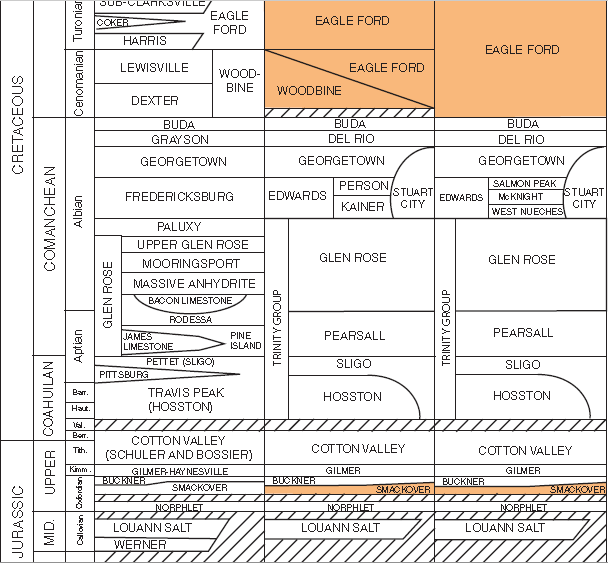
Haynesville Shale stratigraphic column for Texas

The Haynesville Shale is an informal, popular name for a Jurassic-Period rock formation that underlies large parts of southwestern Arkansas, northwest Louisiana, and East Texas. It lies at depths of 10,500–13,000 feet (3,200–4,000 m) below the land’s surface. It is part of a large rock formation which is known by geologists as the Haynesville Formation. The Haynesville Shale underlies an area of about 9,000 square miles (23,000 km^{2}) and averages about 200–300 feet (61–91 m) thick. The Haynesville Shale is overlain by sandstone of the Cotton Valley Group and underlain by limestone of the Smackover Formation.

It contains vast quantities of recoverable natural gas. This natural gas is known as "shale gas" because the wells produce from low-permeability mudstones that are also the source for the natural gas. It was known to contain large quantities of natural gas prior to 2008. However, prior to that time, it was uneconomic to extract the natural gas. As a result of rising gas prices and improved technology in hydraulic fracturing and directional drilling, it became possible to extract the gas from the Haynesville Shale in an economic manner.

== Source of name ==
The Haynesville Formation, from which the Haynesville Shale gets its name, was named after the town of Haynesville, Claiborne Parish, Louisiana. The type location for Haynesville Formation is the Hunt Oil Company No. 1 well in Haynesville oil field, sec. 3, T. 23 N., R. 7 W., Claiborne Parish, Louisiana. In many geological reports and journal papers, the Haynesville Shale was classified as part of the Bossier Shale, although they are now classified as separate formations.

== Lithology of Haynesville Shale ==
The Haynesville Shale is a lithological heterogeneous, often organic-rich, mudstone. The compositions of these mudstones vary greatly depending on geographic location and stratigraphic position. They vary from calcareous mudstone near the carbonate platforms and islands to argillaceous mudstone in areas where submarine fans prograded into the basin and diluted organic matter. For example, the Haynesville Shale has been observed to vary in composition from 25 to 35 percent clay and 5 to 30 percent calcite in samples recovered from one oil-and-gas well. In that well, the Haynesville Shale consists of silty, argillaceous mudstones, silty, calcareous mudstones, and dolomitic mudstones and dolomites. The silty, argillaceous mudstones contain more than 30% silt-sized siliceous grains. The silt often occurs as laminations within these mudstones. In addition, the argillaceous matrix of such mudstones frequently contains numerous calcareous particles and stringers. The calcareous particles include coccoliths, bivalve and gastropod fragments, and calcispheres. Organic matter in the form of amorphous kerogen coats the argillaceous material. Silty, calcareous mudstones contain more than 20% calcite. In these mudstones, the calcite occurs as silt-sized microfossil hash composed of fragmented fossils and carbonate mud. Where organic matter is low and silts are rare, the calcareous microfossil and carbonate mud has recrystallized. Possibly, further alteration of silty, calcareous mudstones has resulted in the formation of the dolomitic mudstones and dolomites. Both the silty, argillaceous mudstones and silty, calcareous mudstones often exhibit sparse-to-abundant, laminated pelletal fabrics.

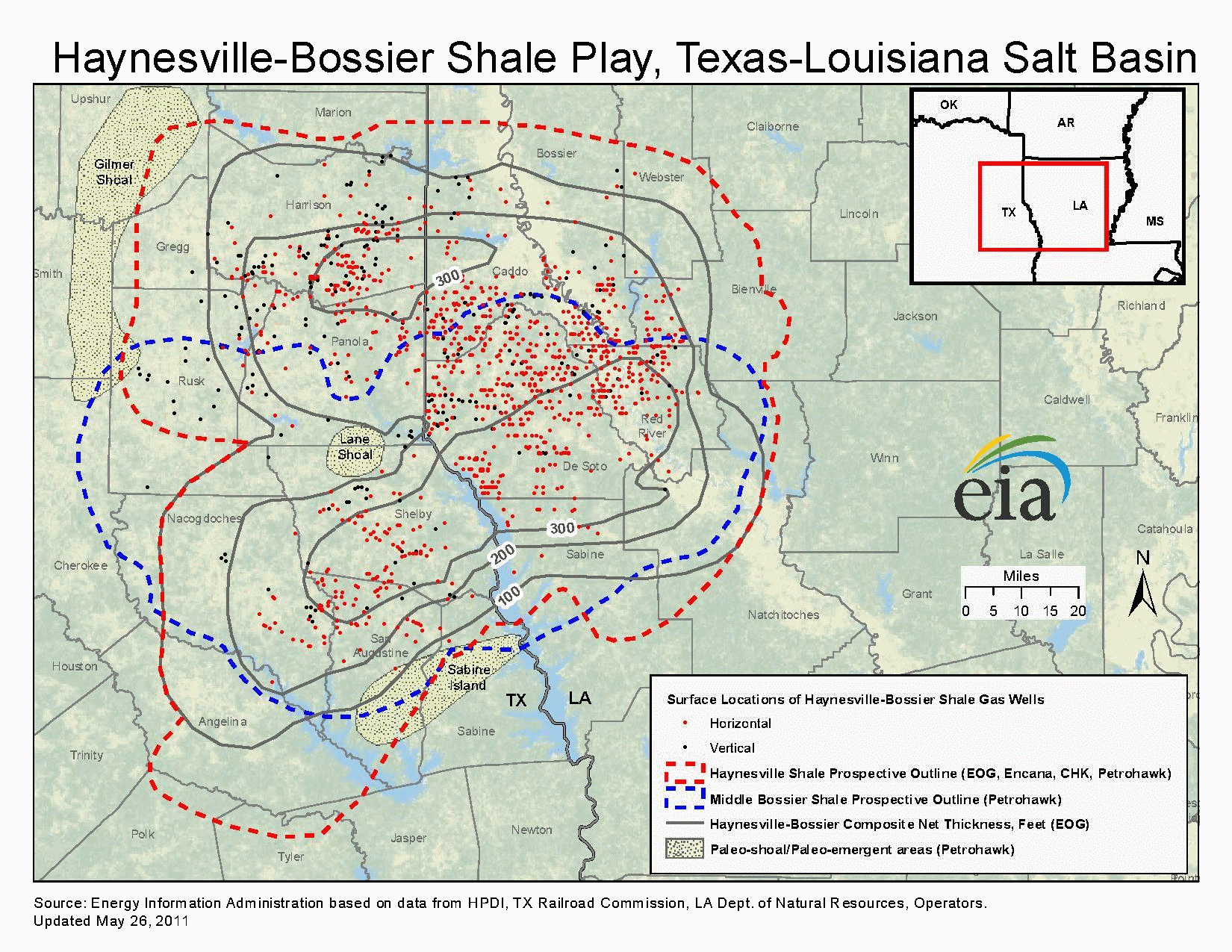
Map showing distribution of Haynesville Shale within East Texas and northwest Louisiana

The Haynesville Formation consists of marine and coastal-plain limestone, shale, mudstone, and sandstone. In addition to the Haynesville Shale, the Haynesville Formation contains two formal subdivisions, which geologists call members. They are the Gilmer Limestone, also informally known as the Cotton Valley Limestone, and Buckner Anhydrite members. The Gilmer Limestone and Buckner Anhydrite members represent coastal and shallow marine deposits, which formed along the northern boundary of the basin in which the Haynesville Shale accumulated and separate it from contemporaneous undifferentiated nonmarine deposits that occur beneath Arkansas further north. In addition, the Gilmer Limestone member also represents a carbonate platform with oolite shoals that lie beneath central Upshur and western Smith counties, Texas. They comprise the western boundary of the ancient shelf basin within which Haynesville Shale accumulated. A third, informal member, which called the "Gray sandstone", of the Haynesville Formation interfingers with Haynesville Shale along its northern edge. This sandstone is regarded as having accumulated as submarine fans carrying sediment from the coastline into the basin within which the Haynesville Shale accumulated.

== Fossils and age ==
Very limited detailed descriptions of the Haynesville Shale indicated that it is fossiliferous. The reported fossils include unidentified coccoliths, bivalves, gastropods, and calcispheres. Both stratigraphic relationships and a nanofossil (coccolith) assemblage described from it indicates that it is Kimmeridgian, 151 to 157 million years old.

== Depositional environment ==
The Haynesville Shale was deposited in a restricted basin that was located on a southward-sloping continental shelf covered by relatively shallow water. The mudstone comprising it accumulated as a widespread and laterally continuous blanket across the limits of this restricted basin. The accumulation of pelleted, fossiliferous, organic-rich carbonate mud and even and wavy-lenticular laminated beds of very fine quartz silt and detrital clay reflects the mixed accumulation of carbonate sediments generated within this basin and clastic sediments that came from outside it. The northern edge of this basin consisted of shallow coastal waters floored by carbonate muds and oolite shoals lying just north of the modern Louisiana–Arkansas border. The shallow coastal waters were bordered further north by an arid coastal plain characterized by extensive sabkhas. The western edge of the basin in which the Haynesville Shale accumulated consisted of a broad north-south carbonate platform with prominent oolite shoals. The southern rim of this ancient basin and extent of the Haynesville Shale was an ancient Jurassic island, called Sabine Island. This ancient island now lies deeply buried beneath the surface of Sabine County, Texas.

The carbonate platforms, their oolite shoals, the Sabine Island, and prehistoric Gulf of Mexico coastline created a restricted basin that marine currents could only readily access from the east. As a result of these restrictive conditions, anoxic conditions frequently occurred during the deposition of the sediments that form the Haynesville Shale. Anoxic bottom water conditions allowed organic matter falling to the floor of this basin to be preserved and incorporated into sediments that became the Haynesville Shale. The mechanisms by which organic matter accumulated within these sediments consisted of a complex interplay of local carbonate generation, clastic input from outside sources, variable burial rates, and variable bottom water anoxia and euxinia.

== Natural gas ==
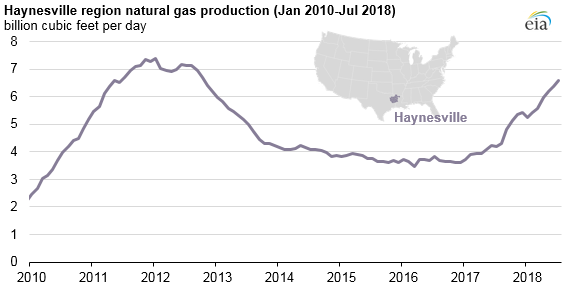
Natural gas production from Haynesville Shale (2010–2018)

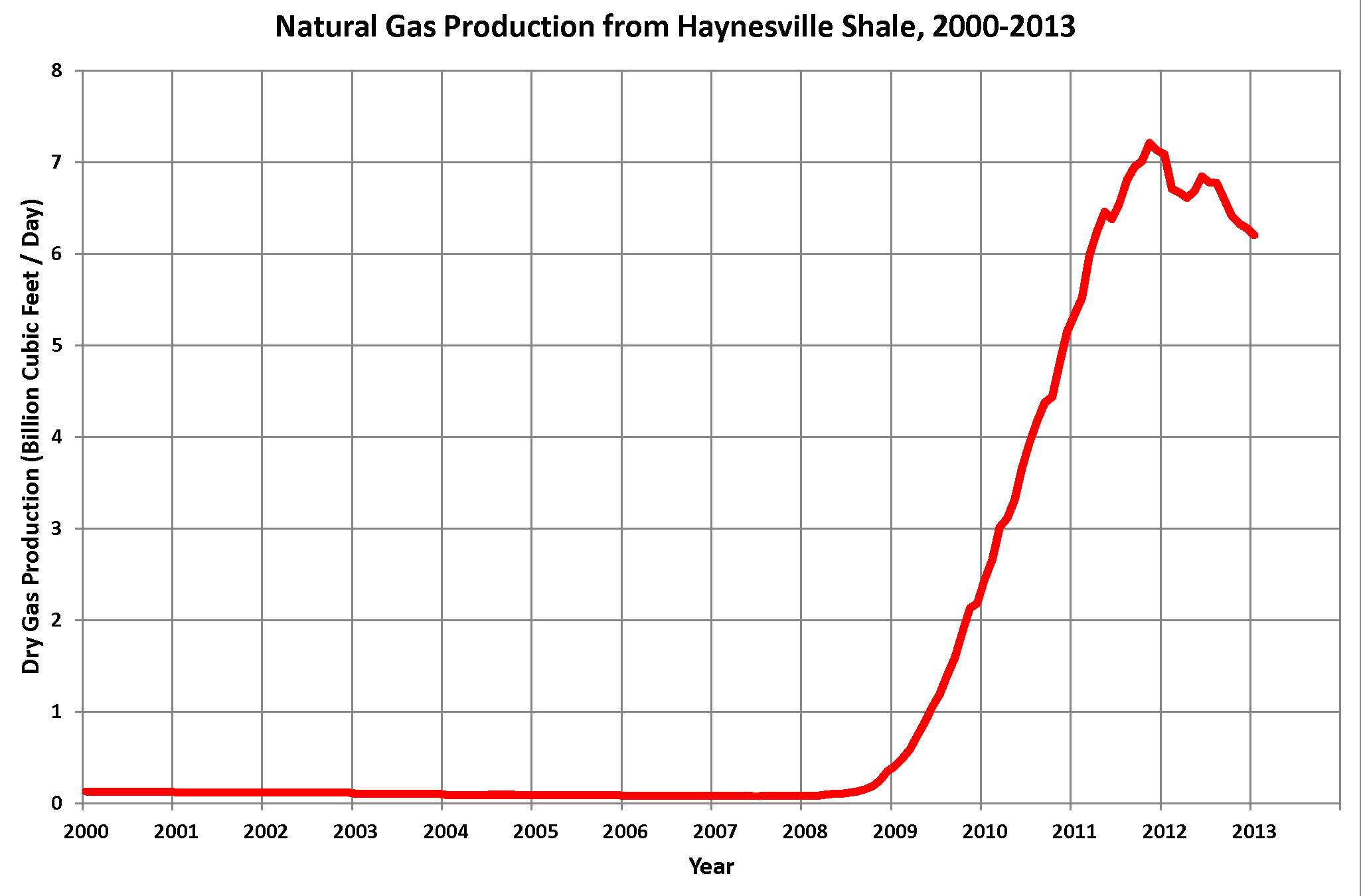
Historical gas production from Haynesville Shale (2000–2013)

The Haynesville Shale came into prominence in 2008 as a major producer of shale gas in East Texas and Louisiana. Producing natural gas from the Haynesville Shale involves drilling wells 10,000–13,000 feet (3,000–4,000 m) deep; the formation becomes deeper to the south.

In 2008, the Haynesville Shale was thought to be the largest natural gas field in the contiguous 48 states, with an estimated 250×10^{12} cubic feet (7.1×10^{12} m^{3}) of recoverable gas. More recently, as of 2009, the Haynesville was estimated to have 75×10^{12} cubic feet (2.1×10^{12} m^{3}) of recoverable gas, second only to the Marcellus Formation in the US. Some scientists estimated recoverable reserves average of 6.5×10^{9} cubic feet (1.8×10^{8} m^{3}) per well. The US Energy Information Administration estimated that the average well would produce 2.67×10^{9} cubic feet (7.6×10^{7} m^{3}) of gas.

Production has boomed since 2008, creating a number of new millionaires in the Shreveport, Louisiana, region. Haynesville gas production peaked at 7.2×10^{9} cubic feet (2.0×10^{8} m^{3}) per day in November 2011. In January 2013 the formation produced 6.2×10^{9} cubic feet (1.8×10^{8} m^{3}), 9.3% of all the gas produced in the US.

The other members of the Haynesville Formation are also the source of oil and gas production. Oil and gas is currently produced from shelf-edge carbonate reservoirs which consist of oolite shoals within the Gilmer Limestone and Buckner Anhydrite members. The submarine fan sandstones of the Gray sand in north Louisiana are also significant producers.

=== Proved reserves ===
- 2010, US Energy Information Administration: 24.5×10^{12} cubic feet (6.9×10^{11} m^{3}) of gas
- 2011, US Energy Information Administration: 29.5×10^{12} cubic feet (8.4×10^{11} m^{3}) of gas

=== Documentary film ===
A documentary film entitled "Haynesville: A Nation's Hunt for an Energy Future" has been made on the subject of the mineral rights leasing "gold rush" and the potential impact of the Haynesville Shale gas play on national and global energy picture.

== Mineral Owner Collaboration ==
Not long after the land-leasing boom began in 2008, new mineral owners across northwest Louisiana and East Texas joined online forums and began sharing information with each other about the process of oil and gas leasing, leasing bonus payments, and well production results. GoHaynesvilleShale.com was the first and largest of its kind with over 20,000 members.

== See also ==
- Shale gas in the United States
- Brown Dense
