= Demographics of Louisiana =

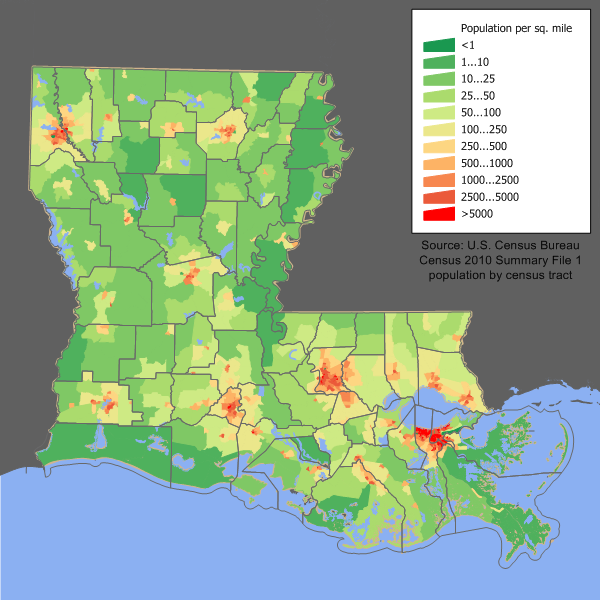
A map of Louisiana's population density in 2010

Historical population
Census	Pop.	Note	%±
1880	939,946		—
1890	1,118,588		19.0%
1900	1,381,625		23.5%
1910	1,656,388		19.9%
1920	1,798,509		8.6%
1930	2,101,593		16.9%
1940	2,363,880		12.5%
1950	2,683,516		13.5%
1960	3,257,022		21.4%
1970	3,641,306		11.8%
1980	4,205,900		15.5%
1990	4,219,973		0.3%
2000	4,468,976		5.9%
2010	4,533,372		1.4%
2020	4,657,757		2.7%
2025 (est.)	4,618,189		−0.8%
Source:1910–2020, 2025

Louisiana is a South Central U.S. state, with a 2020 census resident population of 4,657,757, and apportioned population of 4,661,468. Much of the state's population is concentrated in southern Louisiana in the Greater New Orleans, Florida Parishes, and Acadiana regions, with the remainder in North and Central Louisiana's major metropolitan areas (Shreveport-Bossier City; Monroe-West Monroe; and Alexandria). The center of population of Louisiana is located in Pointe Coupee Parish, in the city of New Roads.

== Race and ethnicity ==
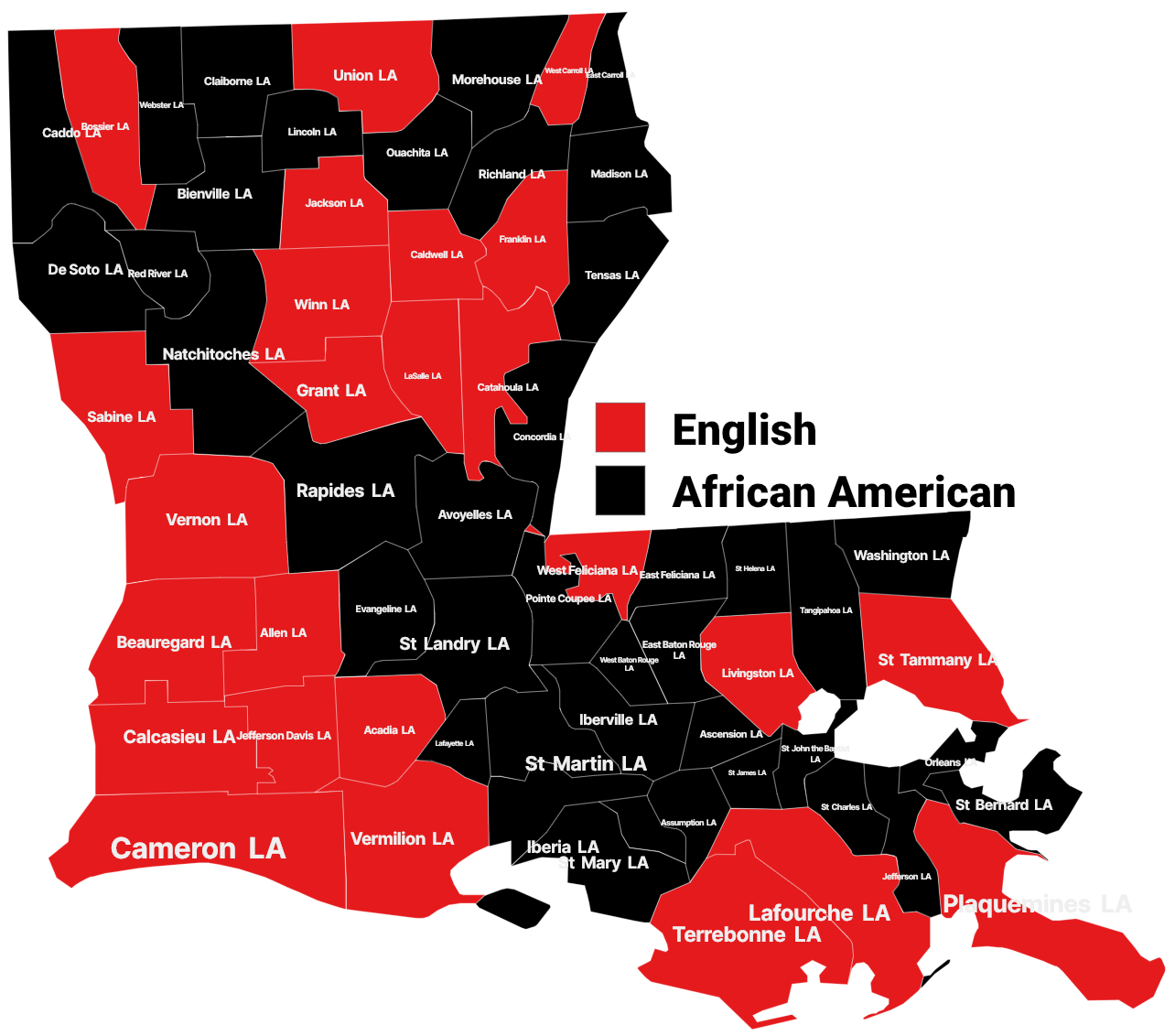
Largest alone or in any combination ethnic origin by parish in Louisiana, per the 2020 census.

Demographics of Louisiana (csv)
By race	White	Black	AIAN*	Asian	NHPI*
2000 (total population)	65.39%	32.94%	0.96%	1.45%	0.07%
2000 (Hispanic only)	2.09%	0.28%	0.06%	0.03%	0.01%
2005 (total population)	64.77%	33.47%	0.97%	1.60%	0.07%
2005 (Hispanic only)	2.52%	0.27%	0.06%	0.03%	0.01%
Growth 2000–05 (total population)	0.26%	2.86%	2.26%	11.98%	2.25%
Growth 2000–05 (non-Hispanic only)	-0.47%	2.89%	2.47%	12.11%	3.93%
Growth 2000–05 (Hispanic only)	22.23%	-1.03%	-0.78%	6.41%	-5.82%
* AIAN is American Indian or Alaskan Native; NHPI is Native Hawaiian or Pacific Islander

Racial and ethnic composition as of the 2020 census
Race and ethnicity	Alone	Total
White (non-Hispanic)	55.8%	58.7%
African American (non-Hispanic)	31.2%	32.6%
Hispanic or Latino (Note: Persons of Hispanic or Latino origin are not distinguished between total and partial ancestry.)	—	6.9%
Asian	1.8%	2.3%
Native American	0.6%	1.9%
Pacific Islander	0.04%	0.1%
Other	0.4%	1.1%

A map of Louisiana parishes by racial plurality, per the 2020 US census Legend: | Non-Hispanic White 40–50% 50–60% 60–70% 70–80% 80–90% 90%+ | Black or African American 40–50% 50–60% 60–70% 70–80% |

Since end of the 20th century, Louisiana's population has experienced diversification, and its non-Hispanic or non-Latino American white population has been declining. In 2020, the Black or African American population were the largest non-white share of youths. Hispanic and Latino Americans have also increased as the second-largest racial and ethnic composition in the state, making up nearly 7% of Louisiana's population at the 2020 census. The Asian American and multiracial communities have also experienced rapid growth, with many of Louisiana's multiracial population identifying as Cajun or Louisiana Creole.

In the 2020 census, 57.1% of the total population were White Americans; 31.4% were Black or African American, 0.7% American Indian and Alaska Native, 1.9% Asian, <0.0% Native Hawaiian or other Pacific Islander, 3.1% some other race, and 5.9% two or more races. The Hispanic and Latino American population of any race were 6.9% of the total population.

At the 2019 American Community Survey, the largest ancestry groups of Louisiana were African American (31.4%), French (9.6%), German (6.2%), English (4.6%), Italian (4.2%), and Scottish (0.9%). African American and French heritage have been dominant since colonial Louisiana. As of 2011, 49.0% of Louisiana's population younger than age 1 were minorities.

=== White and European Americans ===
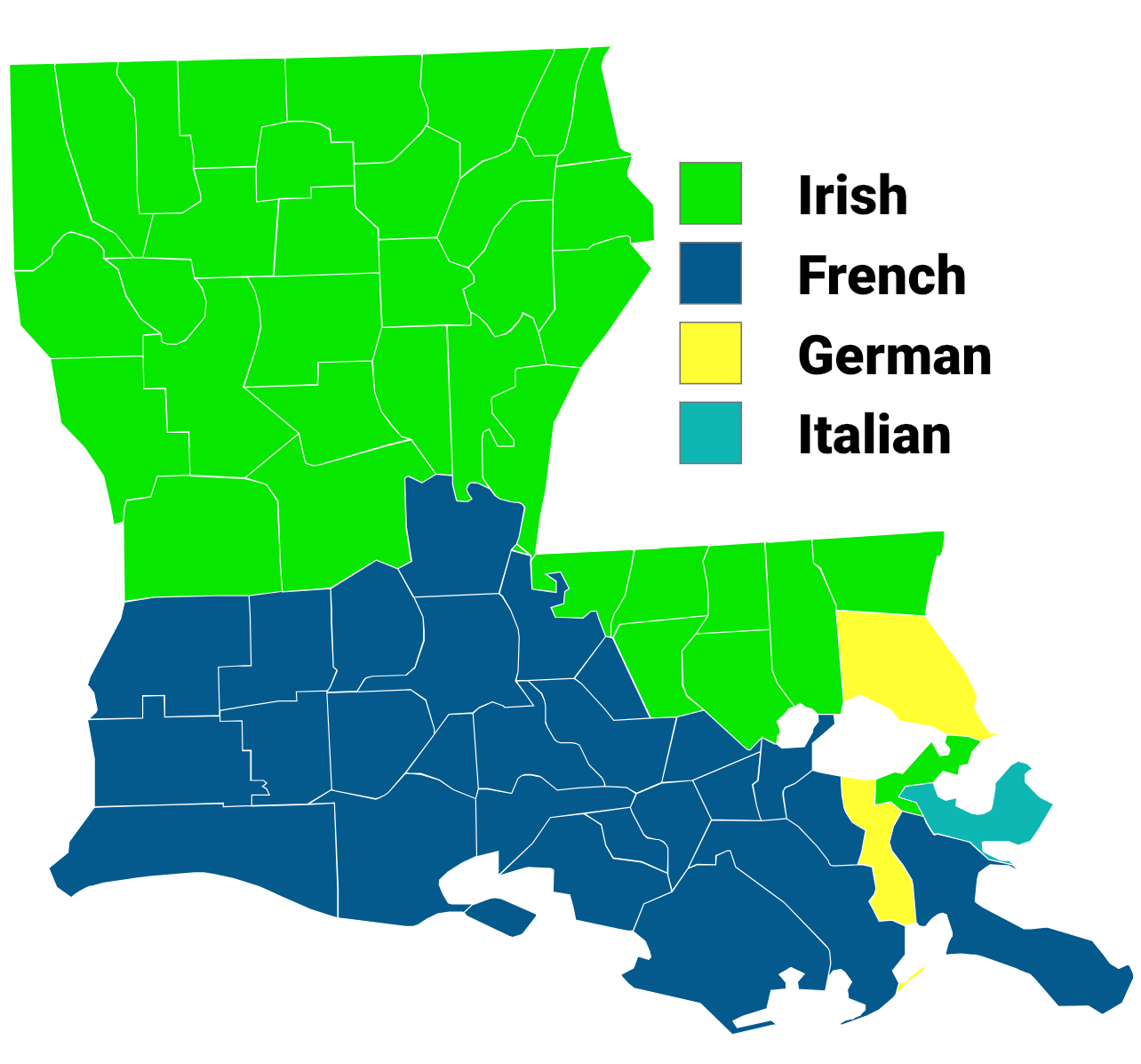
A map of the largest white alone or in any combination ethnic origin besides English, per the 2020 census.

In Louisiana, White and European Americans of Southern background predominate the population and culture in northern and central Louisiana. These people are predominantly of English, Huguenot French, Welsh, and Irish/Scots Irish backgrounds, and share a common, mostly Protestant culture with Americans of neighboring states. The majority of the White American population concentrated upstate are religiously affiliated with the Southern Baptist Convention.

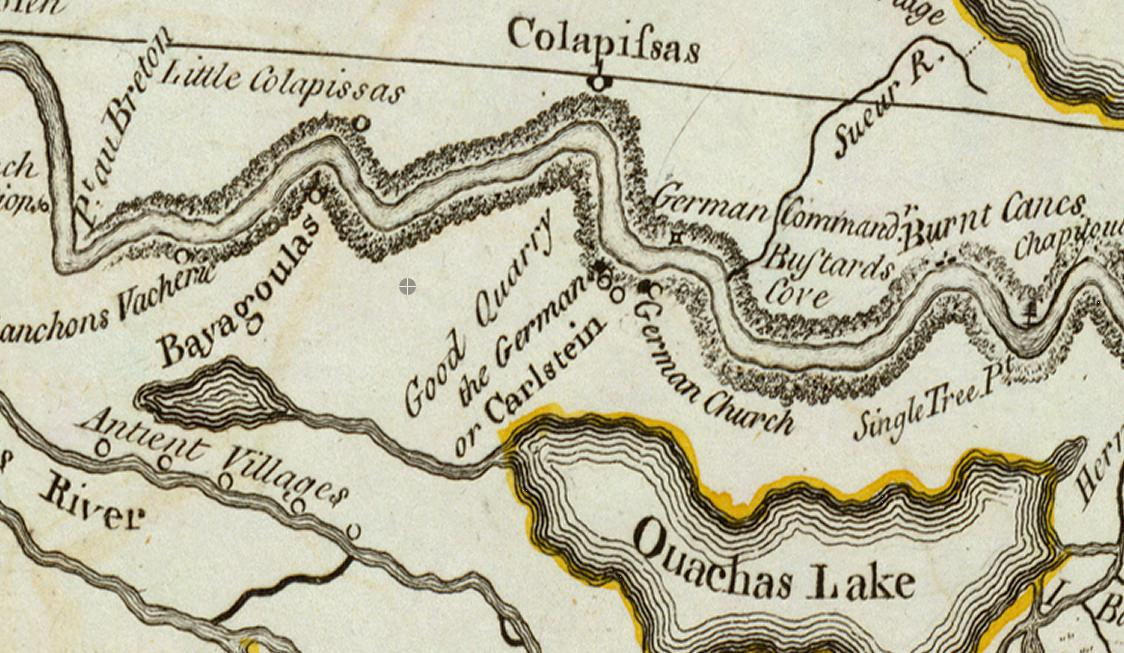
A map of the German Coast

Before the Louisiana Purchase, some German families had settled in a rural area along the lower Mississippi valley, then known as the German Coast. They assimilated into the Cajun and Creole communities.

In 1840, New Orleans was the third largest and most wealthy city in the country and the largest city in the South. Its bustling port and trade economy attracted numerous Irish, Italian, Spanish, Portuguese and German immigrants, of which the first four groups were mostly Catholic with some Germans also being Catholic, thus adding to the Roman Catholic culture in southern Louisiana.

New Orleans is also home to sizable Dutch, Greek and Polish communities, and Jewish populations of various nationalities. More than 10,000 Maltese were reported to come to Louisiana in the early 20th century. Croatians are credited with developing the state's commercial oyster industry. There is a French Romani (Gitan) community in Louisiana.

=== Cajuns and Creoles ===
The Acadiana flag, a symbol of Cajun identity

Cajuns and Creoles of French ancestry are dominant in much of the southern part of the state of Louisiana, alongside non-Cajun or non-Creole Americans of White or Black/African American heritage. Louisiana Cajuns are the descendants of French-speaking Acadians from colonial French Acadia, which is now the present-day Canadian provinces of New Brunswick, Nova Scotia and Prince Edward Island. Cajuns remained isolated in the swamps of southern Louisiana well into the 20th century. During the early part of the 20th century, attempts were made to suppress Cajun culture by measures such as forbidding the use of the Louisiana French language in schools.

Flag of the Louisiana Creoles

The Creole people of Louisiana are split into two racial divisions. Créole was the term first given to French settlers born in Louisiana when it was a colony of France. In Spanish, the term for natives was criollo. Given the immigration and settlement patterns, white Creoles are predominantly of French and Spanish ancestry. As the slave population grew in Louisiana, there were also enslaved blacks who could be called Creoles, in the sense of having been born in the colony.

The special meaning of Louisiana Creole, is associated with free people of color (gens de couleur libres), which was generally a third class of mixed-race people who were concentrated in southern Louisiana and New Orleans. This group was formed under French and Spanish rule, made up at first of descendants from relationships between colonial men and enslaved women, mostly African. As time went on, colonial men chose companions who were often women of color, or mixed-race. Often the men would free their companions and children if still enslaved.

The arrangements were formalized in New Orleans as plaçage, often associated with property settlements for the young women and education for their children, or at least for sons. Creoles who were free people of color during French and Spanish rule formed a distinct class. Many were educated and became wealthy property owners or artisans, and they were politically active. Often these mixed-race Creoles married only among themselves. They were a distinct group between French and Spanish descendants, and the mass of enslaved Africans.

After the Haitian Revolution, the class of free people of color in New Orleans and Louisiana was increased by French-speaking refugees and immigrants from Haiti. At the same time, French-speaking whites entered the city, some bringing slaves with them, who in Haiti were mostly African natives. In 1809, nearly 10,000 refugees from Saint-Domingue arrived from Cuba, where they had first fled, to settle en masse in New Orleans. They doubled that city’s population and helped preserve its French language and culture for several generations.

Creoles of color today are frequently racially mixed, being of African, French (and/or Spanish) and/or Native American heritage. Their families have historically adhered to the French or Creole-speaking environment and culture. The separate status of Creoles of color was diminished after the Louisiana Purchase, and even more so after the American Civil War. Those Creoles who had been free for generations before the American Civil War lost some of their legal and social standing.

=== Black and African Americans ===
Louisiana's population had the second largest proportion of Black and African Americans in the United States in 2010, after Mississippi. The Black and African American population have been historically concentrated throughout much of the state, divided along cultural lines; the Black/African American communities upstate are predominantly Protestant affiliates with the National Baptist Convention (USA) and National Baptist Convention of America. The remainder of the communities in southern Louisiana often adhere to Catholicism, though Louisiana Voodoo and Haitian Vodou are also practiced by a minority. Among the Black and African American Catholic communities in southern Louisiana, cultural distinctives commonly kept are Gospel music and some Charismatic Christian traits.

=== Hispanic and Latino Americans ===
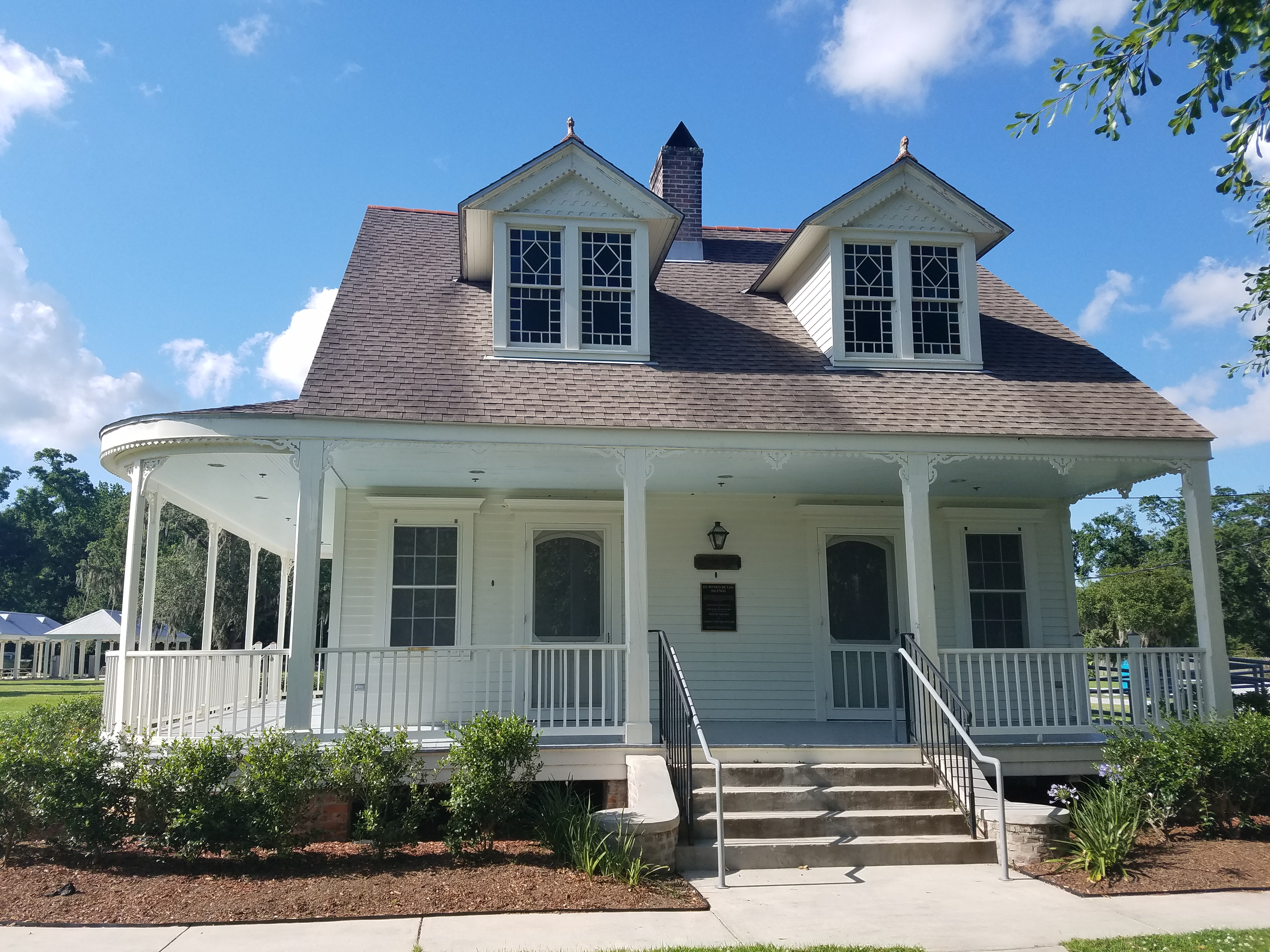
El Museo de los Isleños (Los Isleños Museum) in Saint Bernard

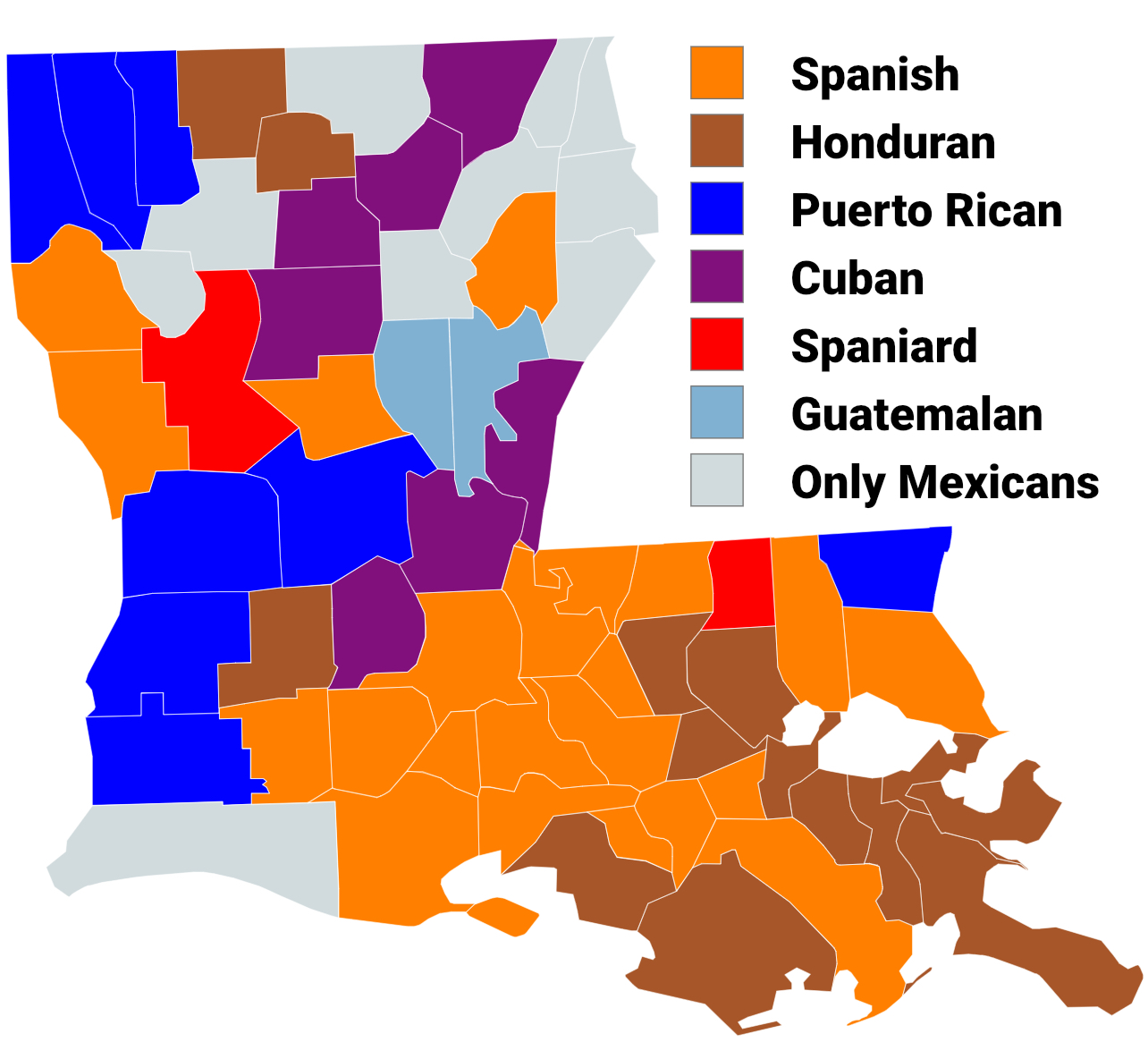
Largest Hispanic ethnic origin in Louisiana besides Mexican, per the 2020 census

Among Hispanic and Latino American Louisianans, some families can trace their heritage toward Spanish Louisiana. Canary Islanders settled in the area down river from New Orleans, now St. Bernard Parish, and in other parts of the southeast of the state during Spanish rule. These would form the basis of Louisiana's Isleño population. Settlement at the Los Adaes presidio and mission also resulted in a local Spanish-speaking population along the Sabine River. Louisiana has a growing Mexican and Central American population. The majority of Latinos in Louisiana are of Mexican origin.

Louisiana has received a significant influx of immigrants from various Latin American nations, including Mexico, Cuba, the Dominican Republic, Honduras, El Salvador and Nicaragua. New Orleans is home to one of the largest Honduran American communities in the United States. Established Cuban American and Dominican communities can be found in the New Orleans region, with some origins tracing back to the 1920s and even the 1880s. Many of these individuals are immigrants, particularly among the Cuban population, which includes political refugees fleeing the anti-Castro regime.

=== Asian Americans ===
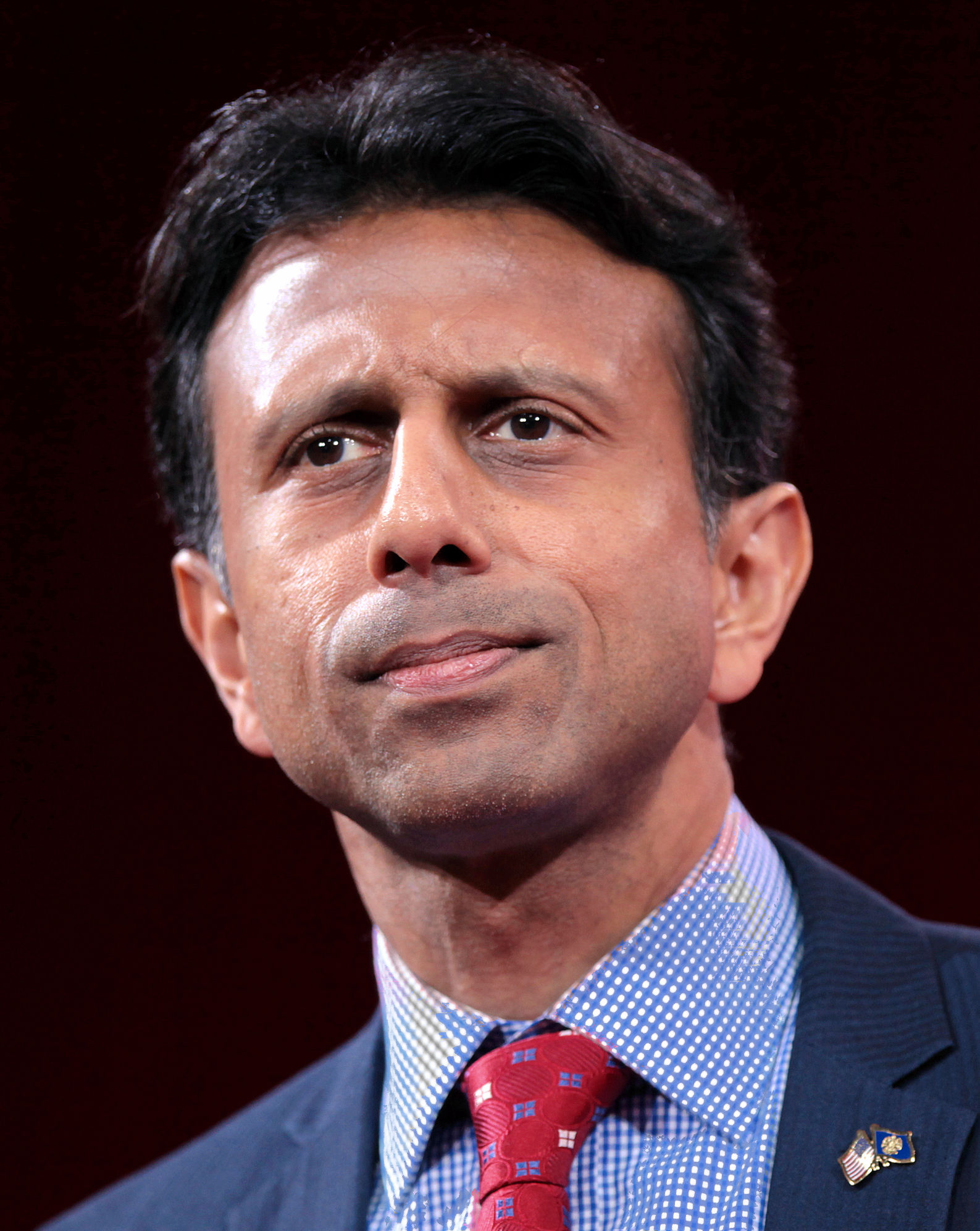
Bobby Jindal, first Indian American elected governor of any US state

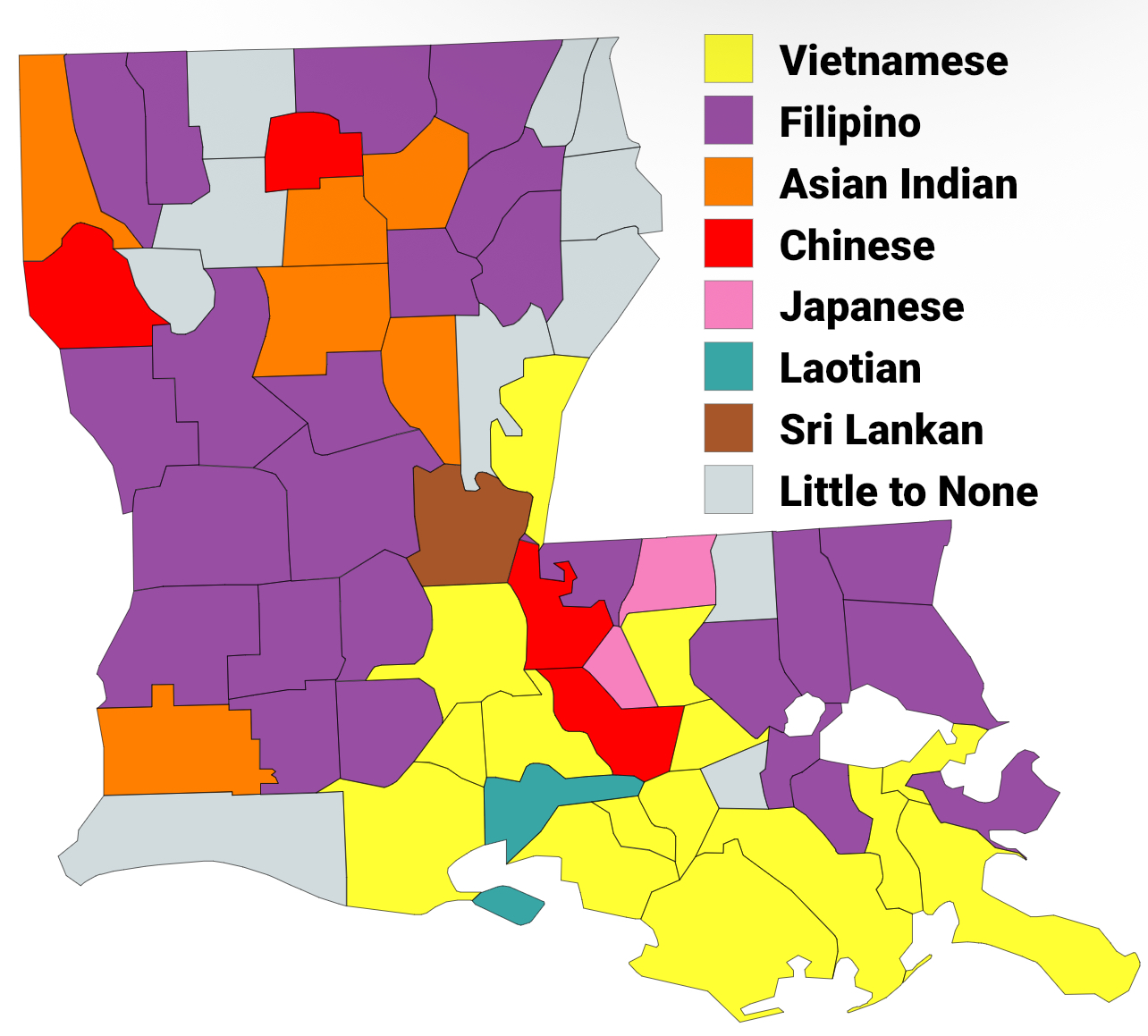
The largest Asian alone or in any combination ethnic origin by county, per the 2020 census.

Asian Indians were the largest group of Asian Americans in the state, followed by the Chinese. Filipinos were the third largest single Asian American ethnicity.

The first significant wave of Chinese migration took place during Reconstruction after the American Civil War. Local planters imported Cantonese contract workers from Cuba and California as a low-cost substitute for slave labor. By 1870, the Chinese had begun migrating from the plantations to the cities, especially New Orleans, forming a Chinatown that existed from the 1880s until its removal by WPA development in 1937. The Chinese dominated the city's laundry industry during this period, as they had in other American cities. But by the 1940s, the younger generation of American-born Chinese were already entering college and abandoning the laundry industry.

Subsequent waves of immigration have brought many Chinese from Taiwan, Hong Kong, Mainland China, as well as Indians, Middle Easterners, Koreans, Japanese, Southeast Asians, and other Asians, to New Orleans, Baton Rouge, and other cities in the state. The Vietnamese began migrating to the southern part of the state and the Gulf Coast region after the Fall of Saigon in 1975. Since then, the Vietnamese have become one of the largest Asian populations in the state. The Vietnamese have also come to dominate the fishing and shrimping industry in southeast Louisiana.

Filipinos had immigrated all the way to the Southern United States from the Philippines. Filipinos rebelled against slavery on ships and settled in Louisiana, near the similarly Spanish-colonized independent ethnic Isleño community. The oldest community of Asian Americans in the United States at Saint Malo, Louisiana was founded by Filipino exiles from the Manila galleon trade between Mexico and the Philippines. The exact date of the establishment of Saint Malo is disputed. The settlement may have been formed as early as 1763 or 1765 by the Filipino deserters and escaped slaves of the Spanish Manila Galleon trade.

The members of the community were commonly referred to as Manila men, or Manilamen, and later Tagalas. Filipino Americans residing in the region were recruited by local pirate Jean Lafitte to join his Baratarians, a group of privately recruited soldiers serving under the American forces under the command of Andrew Jackson, in the defense of New Orleans. They played a decisive role in securing the American victory, firing barrage after barrage of well-aimed artillery fire.

Several Asians have held high office in Louisiana. Harry Lee, a Chinese American, was a federal judge, candidate for governor, and sheriff of Jefferson Parish, an office he held for 27 years, from 1979 until his death in 2007. The first Vietnamese American to be elected to U.S. Congress was Joseph Cao of New Orleans, in 2008. In 2007, former congressman Bobby Jindal of Baton Rouge was elected governor of Louisiana, becoming the first Indian American to be elected governor of any state.

=== Native Americans ===
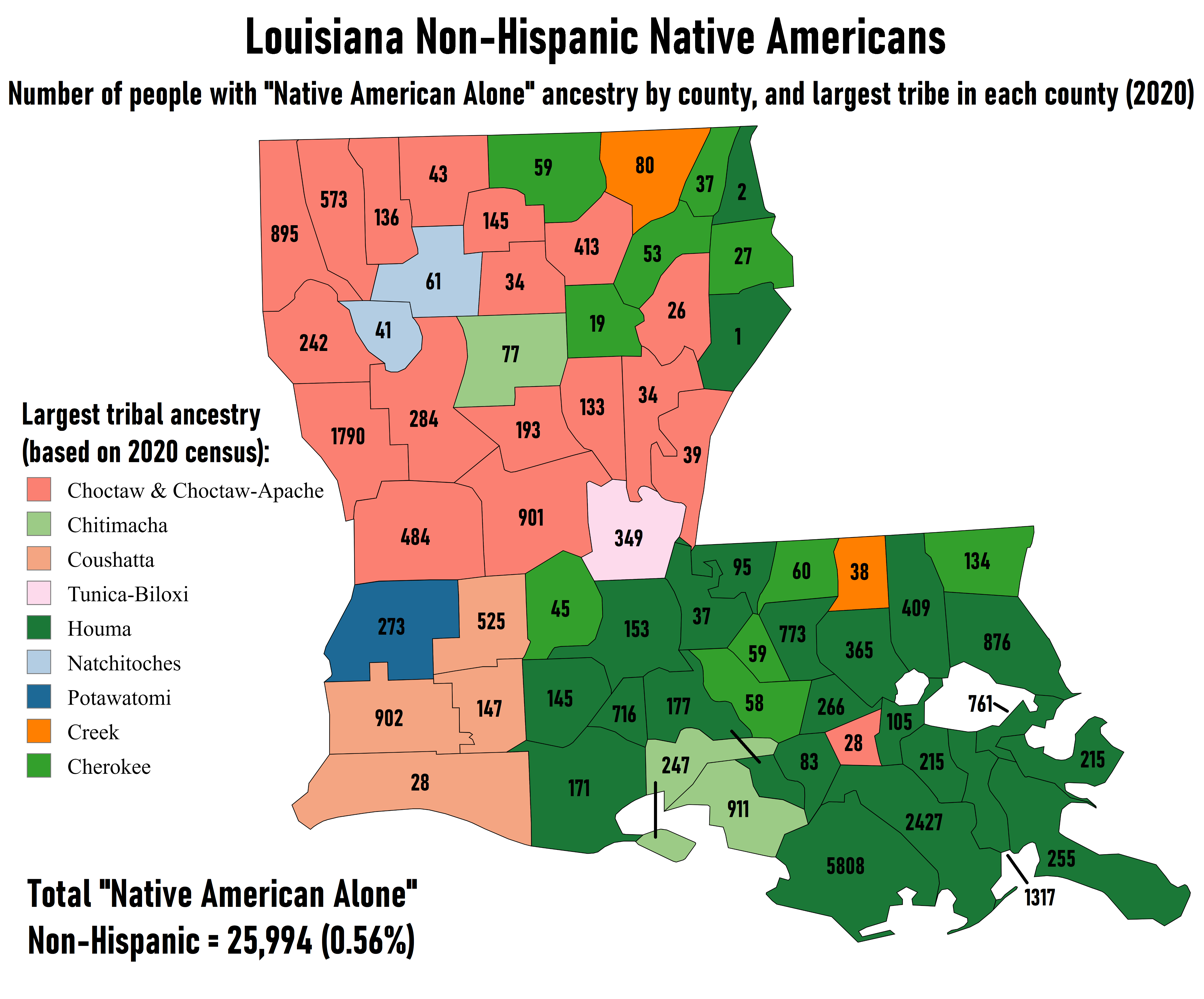
The largest Non-Hispanic Native American ancestry by county and numbers of people reporting "Native American Alone"

The territory which is now Louisiana was originally inhabited by tribes such as the Chitimacha, the Houma, the Choctaw, the Natchez, the Atakapa, the Acolapissa, the Adai (a division of the Caddo), the Natchitoches Confederacy and few other tribes. Several more tribes entered Louisiana later, either settling there permanently or just migrating across the territory of the state. The Biloxi and the Tunica originally lived further east (in what is now Mississippi), but they entered the territory of Louisiana in the second half of the 18th century and settled there.

Today Louisiana is home to four federally recognized Native American tribes, the Chitimacha, the Coushatta, the Jena Band of Choctaw Indians, and the Tunica-Biloxi. Apart from these federally recognized tribes, there are also several state recognized tribes, including the Houma, the Adai Caddo, the Choctaw-Apache and the Natchitoches. In the 2020 United States census in total 31,657 people in Louisiana declared having only Native American ancestry, and further 71,471 people declared Native American in combination with one or more races.

== Vital statistics ==
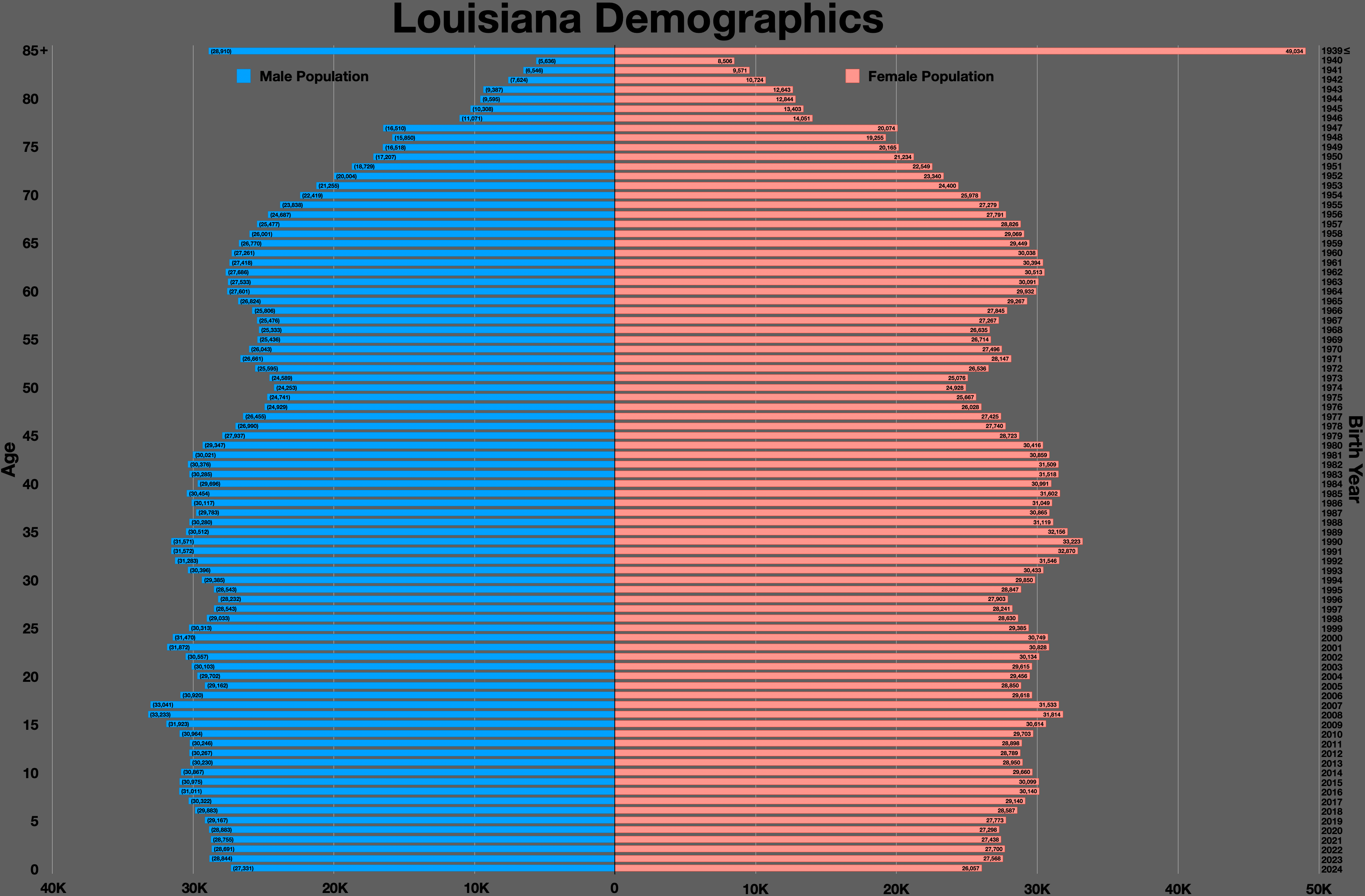
Louisiana's population pyramid, in 2026

Note: Births in table don't add up, because Hispanics are counted both by their ethnicity and by their race, giving a higher overall number.

Live Births by Single Race/Ethnicity of Mother
Race	2014	2015	2016	2017	2018	2019	2020	2021	2022	2023	2024
White	34,264 (53.1%)	34,047 (52.6%)	33,008 (52.4%)	31,509 (51.6%)	30,458 (51.1%)	29,628 (50.3%)	28,635 (49.9%)	29,100 (50.7%)	28,105 (49.8%)	27,223 (49.6%)	26,427 (49.6%)
Black	25,025 (38.8%)	25,001 (38.6%)	23,135 (36.6%)	22,469 (36.8%)	22,119 (37.1%)	22,106 (37.5%)	21,552 (37.6%)	20,958 (36.5%)	20,229 (35.8%)	19,625 (35.7%)	18,386 (34.5%)
Asian	1,537 (2.4%)	1,498 (2.3%)	1,294 (2.0%)	1,169 (1.9%)	1,156 (1.9%)	1,163 (2.0%)	1,037 (1.8%)	1,011 (1.8%)	1,045 (1.9%)	953 (1.7%)	1,046 (2.0%)
American Indian	373 (0.6%)	392 (0.6%)	321 (0.5%)	318 (0.5%)	313 (0.5%)	284 (0.5%)	245 (0.4%)	262 (0.5%)	302 (0.5%)	267 (0.5%)	267 (0.5%)
Hispanic (any race)	4,249 (6.6%)	4,826 (7.4%)	4,697 (7.4%)	4,778 (7.8%)	4,717 (7.9%)	4,994 (8.5%)	5,016 (8.7%)	5,267 (9.2%)	5,936 (10.5%)	5,964 (10.9%)	6,291 (11.8%)
Total	64,497 (100%)	64,692 (100%)	63,178 (100%)	61,018 (100%)	59,615 (100%)	58,941 (100%)	57,328 (100%)	57,437 (100%)	56,479 (100%)	54,927 (100%)	53,305 (100%)

- Since 2016, data for births of White Hispanic origin are not collected, but included in one Hispanic group; persons of Hispanic origin may be of any race.

== Immigration ==
In 2018, approximately four percent of Louisianians were immigrants, while another four percent were native-born U.S. citizens with at least one immigrant parent. The majority of Louisianian immigrants came from Mexico (16%), Honduras (15%), Vietnam (10%), the Philippines (5%), and Guatemala (4%). In 2019, approximately 4.2% of Louisianians were immigrants, while 2% were native-born U.S. citizens with at least one immigrant parent. The majority of Louisianian immigrants came from Honduras (18.8%), Mexico (13.6%), Vietnam (11.3%), Cuba (5.8%), and India (4.4%).

Among the immigrant population in 2014, an estimated 64,500 were undocumented; Louisiana's undocumented immigrant population earned more than a billion U.S. dollars and paid $136 million in taxes. The undocumented immigrant population increased to 70,000 in 2016 and comprised two percent of the state population. In 2019, 29.4% of the population were undocumented, and altogether the state's documented and undocumented population paid 1.2 billion U.S. dollars in taxes. Its undocumented population had an estimated household income of $800.8 million, and paid $80.6 million in taxes as of 2019.

== Languages ==
The languages of Native American tribes who inhabited what is now Louisiana include: Tunica, Caddo, Natchez, Choctaw, Atakapa, Chitimacha, and Houma.

Louisiana has a unique linguistic culture, owing to its French and Spanish heritage—although historically—Native American peoples in the area at the time of European encounter were seven tribes distinguished by their languages: Caddo, Tunica, Natchez, Houma, Choctaw, Atakapa, and Chitimacha. Other Native American peoples migrated into the region, escaping European pressure from the east. Among these were the Alabama, Biloxi, Koasati, and Ofo peoples. Only Koasati still has native speakers in Louisiana. Choctaw, Alabama and possibly Caddo are still spoken in other states. Several Louisiana tribes have been working to revitalize their languages.

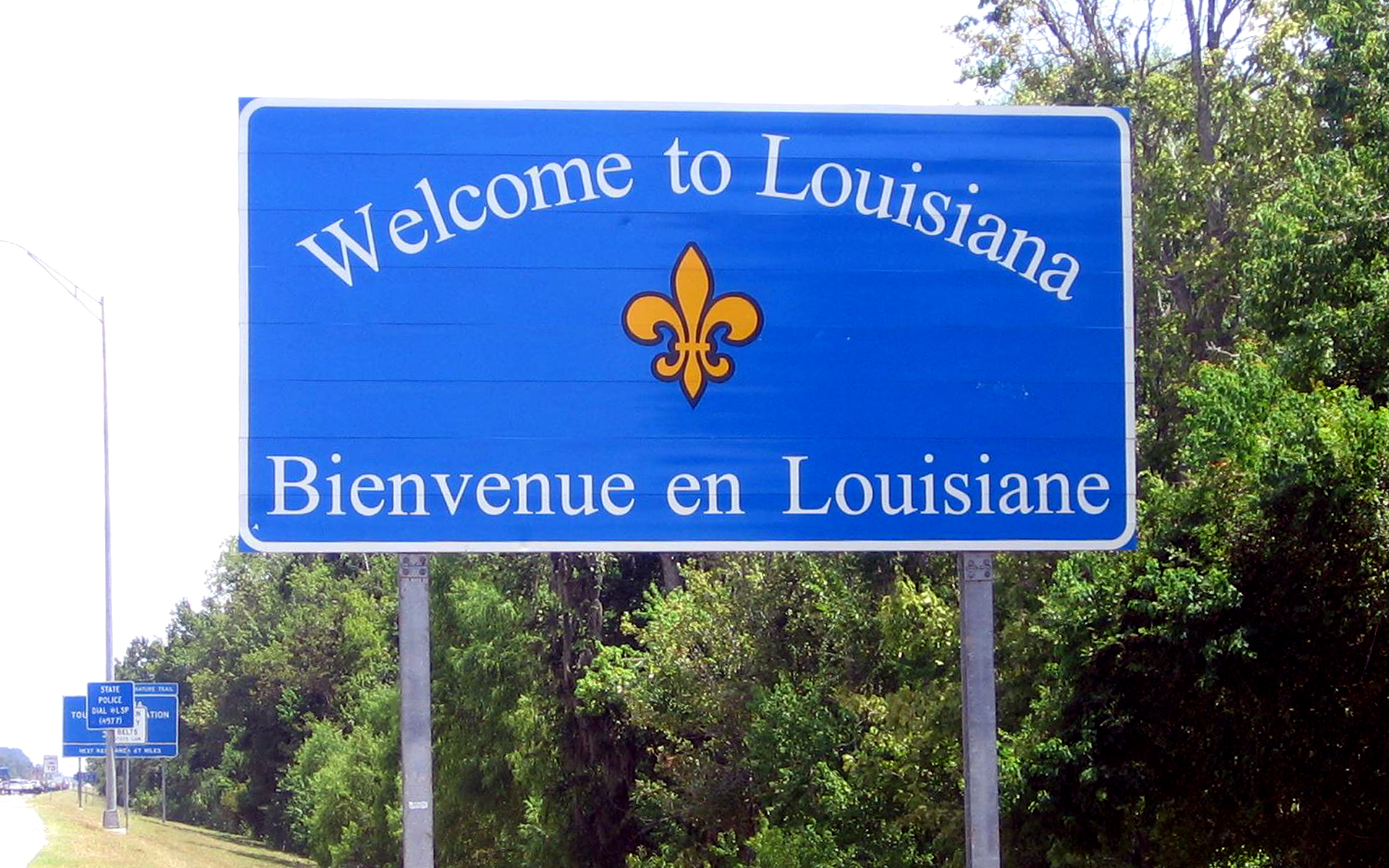
Louisiana's bilingual state welcome sign, recognizing its French heritage

Starting in the 1700s, French colonists began to settle along the coast and founded New Orleans. They established French culture and language institutions. They imported thousands of slaves from tribes of West Africa, who spoke several different languages. In the creolization process, the slaves developed a Louisiana Creole dialect incorporating both French and African forms, which colonists adopted to communicate with them, and which persisted beyond slavery.

During the 19th century after the Louisiana Purchase by the United States, English gradually gained prominence for business and government due to the shift in population with settlement by numerous Americans who were English speakers. Many ethnic French families continued to use French in private. Slaves and some free people of color also spoke Louisiana Creole language. The state constitution of 1812 gave English official status in legal proceedings, but use of French remained widespread.

Subsequent state constitutions reflect the diminishing importance of French. The 1868 constitution, passed during the Reconstruction era before Louisiana was re-admitted to the Union, banned laws requiring the publication of legal proceedings in languages other than English. Subsequently, the legal status of French recovered somewhat, but it never regained its pre-American Civil War prominence.

=== Current ===
Several unique dialects of French, Creole, and English are currently spoken in Louisiana. Dialects of the French language are: Colonial French and Houma French. Louisiana Creole French is the term for one of the Creole languages. Two unique dialects developed of the English language: Louisiana (Cajun) English, a French-influenced variety of English in which dropping of postvocalic /r/ is common; and what is informally known as Yat, which resembles the New York City dialect sometimes with southern influences, particularly that of historical Brooklyn.

Both accents were influenced by large communities of immigrant Irish and Italians. The Yat dialect, which developed in New Orleans, was also influenced by French and Spanish. Two varieties of Spanish—Isleño and Sabine River Spanish—are native to Louisiana and date back to the Spanish colonial period.

Renewed interest in the French language in Louisiana has led to the establishment of Canadian-modeled French immersion schools, and bilingual signage in the historic French neighborhoods of New Orleans and Lafayette. In addition to private organizations, since 1968 the state has maintained the Council for the Development of French in Louisiana (CODOFIL), which promotes use of the French language in the state's tourism, economic development, culture, education and international relations.

In 1984, the international organization Alliance Française, which aims to promote the French language and Francophone cultures, set up in New Orleans with the creation of the Alliance Française of New Orleans, which is now the city's Francophone cultural center.

In 2018, Louisiana became the first U.S. state to join the Organisation internationale de la Francophonie as an observer. Since Louisiana joined the Francophonie, new organizations have launched to help revitalize Louisiana French and Creole, including the Nous Foundation.

In 2000, among persons five years old and older, 90.8% of Louisiana residents spoke only English (99% total spoke English) and 4.7% spoke French at home (7% total spoke French). Other minority languages were Spanish, which was spoken by 2.5% of the population; Vietnamese, by 1.2%; and German, by 0.2%. In 2010, 5.4% of the population age 5 and older spoke Spanish at home, up from 3.5% in 2000. 4.5% spoke French, including Louisiana French and Louisiana Creole, down from 4.8% in 2000.

State law recognizes the usage of English and French in certain circumstances. The Louisiana state constitution does not declare any "de jure official language or languages". The "de facto administrative languages" of the Louisiana state government are English and French.

== Religion ==
Religion in Louisiana (2020)
Religion	Percent
Protestant	53%
Catholic	22%
Other Christian	1.5%
Unaffiliated	19%
Jewish	1%
Other faith	4%

As an ethnically and culturally diverse state, pre-colonial, colonial and present-day Louisianians have adhered to a variety of religions and spiritual traditions. Pre-colonial and colonial Louisianian peoples practiced various Native American religions. Christianity was introduced through the establishment of Spanish and French missions. Haitian Vodou and Louisiana Voodoo were introduced to Louisiana and are practiced to the present day. In the colonial and present-day U.S. state of Louisiana, Christianity grew to become its most predominant religion, representing 84% of the adult population in 2014 and 76.5% in 2020.

=== Protestantism ===
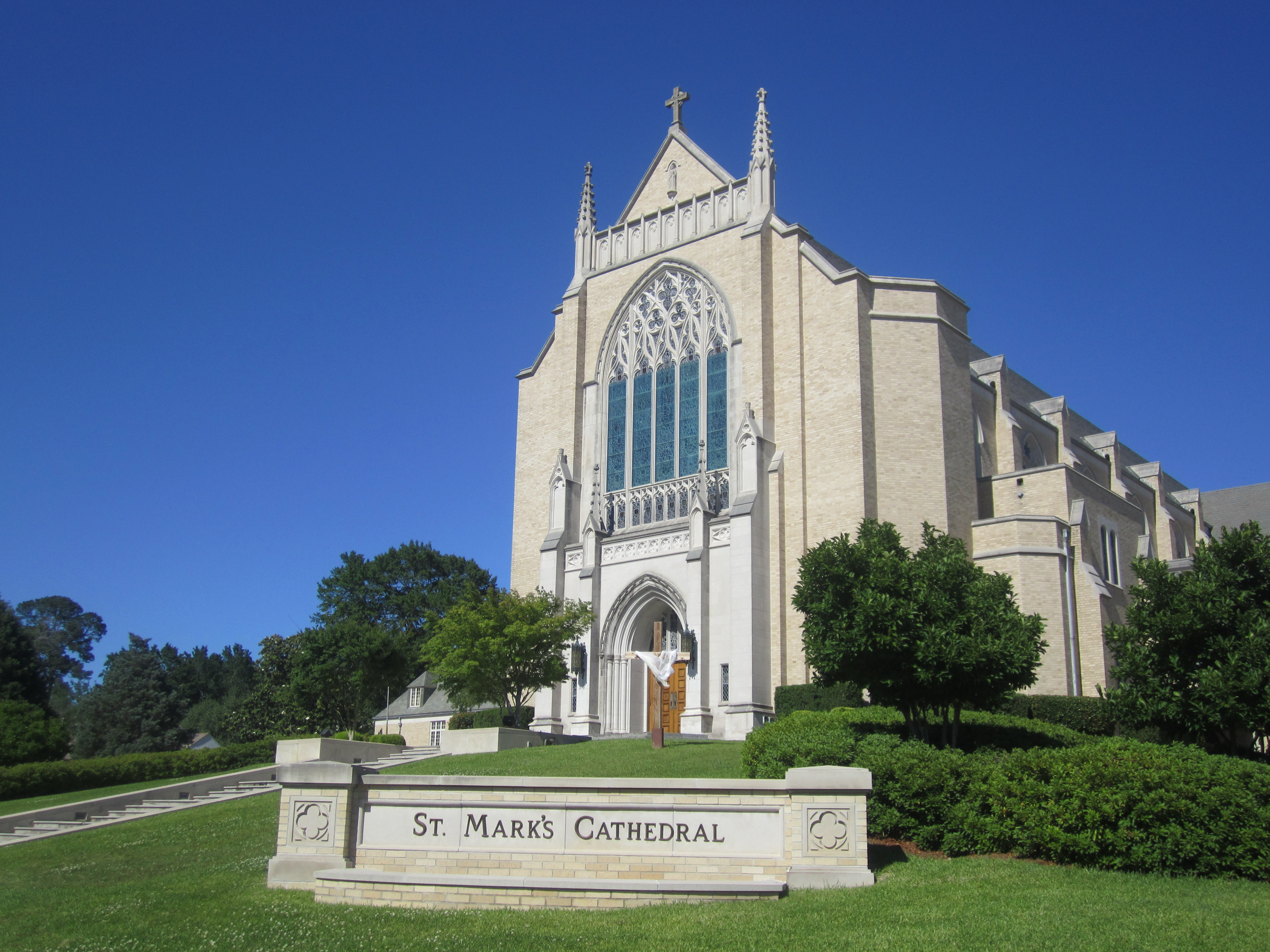
St. Mark's Cathedral of the Episcopal Church USA in Shreveport

Northern Louisiana is more Protestant. Protestantism was introduced to Louisiana in the 1800s, with Baptists establishing two churches in 1812, followed by Methodists. Episcopalians first entered Louisiana in 1805. In 2014, Protestant Christians made up 57% of Louisiana's adult population and 53% in 2020.

Protestants are concentrated in North Louisiana, Central Louisiana, and the northern tier of the Florida Parishes. In 2014, Louisiana's largest Protestant Christian denominations were the Southern Baptist Convention, National Baptist Convention USA, National Baptist Convention of America, Progressive National Baptist Convention, American Baptist Churches USA, non/interdenominational Evangelicals and mainline Protestants, the Assemblies of God USA, Church of God in Christ, African Methodist Episcopal and Christian Methodist Episcopal churches, and the United Methodist Church.

In 2010, the Southern Baptist Convention had 709,650 members, and the United Methodist Church had 146,848. Non-denominational Protestant churches had 195,903 members. In 2020, the Southern Baptists remained the state's largest Protestant denomination (648,734), followed by the United Methodists (128,108); non-denominational Protestants—whether independent congregationalist, United and Uniting, or Bible churches—increased to 357,465. National Missionary Baptists reported 67,518 members, and the National Baptist Convention USA had a statewide membership of 61,997, making them the largest historically and predominantly African American church bodies in Louisiana.

In 2020, Pentecostals were the largest Protestant traditions outside of the Baptists and Methodists. The Assemblies of God USA (45,773) was the state's largest Pentecostal body followed by the Church of God in Christ (32,116). The Protestant Episcopal Church in the United States of America had 23,922 members. The remaining largest Protestant denominations were the Churches of Christ (22,833), Progressive National Baptists (22,756), National Baptists of America (22,034), and Full Gospel Baptists (9,772).

=== Catholicism ===
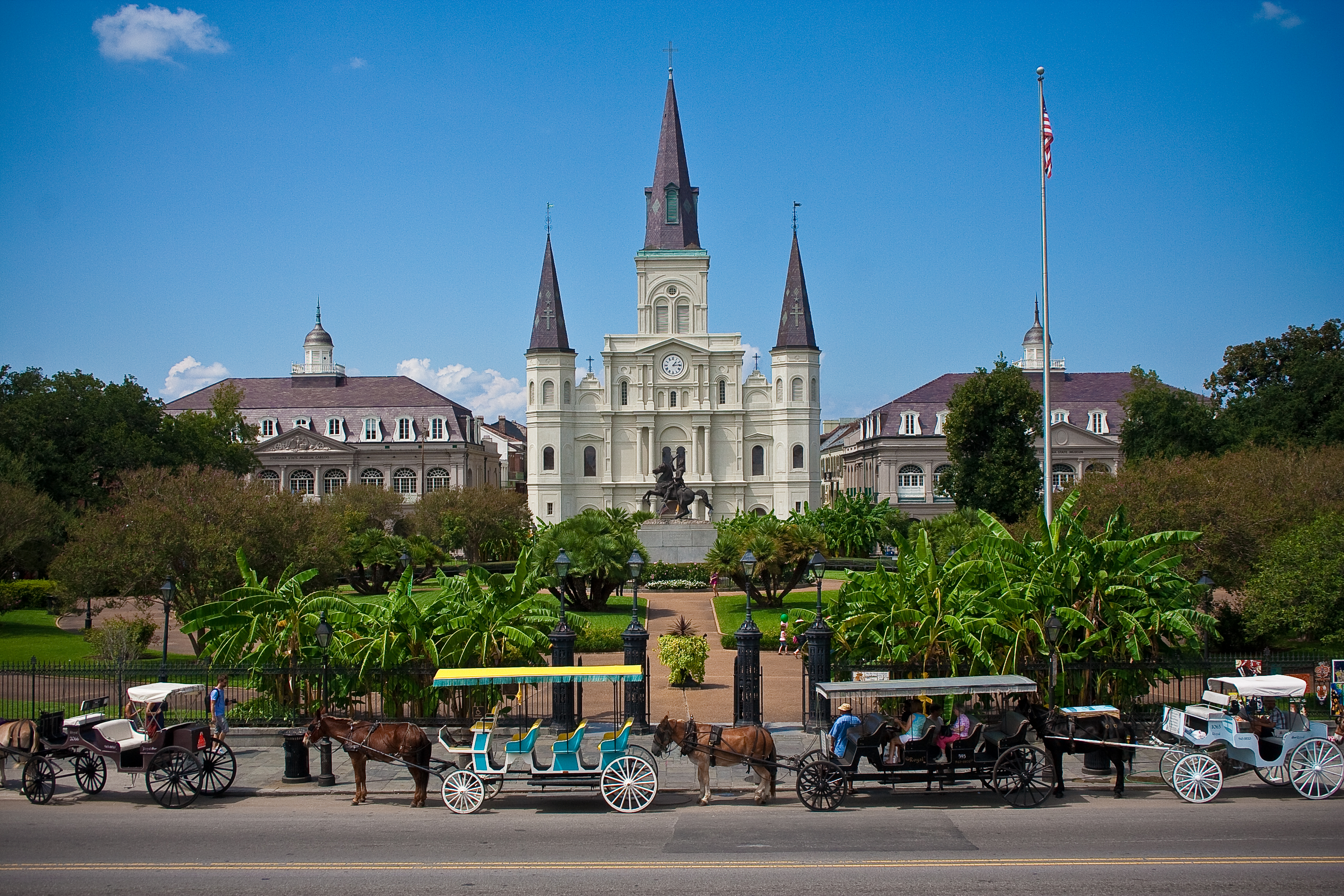
Cathedral Basilica of St. Louis in New Orleans

Because of French and Spanish heritage, and their descendants the Creoles, and later Irish, Italian, Portuguese and German immigrants, southern Louisiana and Greater New Orleans are predominantly Catholic. In 2020, 22% of the adult population were Catholic. Since Creoles were the first settlers, planters and leaders of the territory, they have traditionally been well represented in politics. Most of the early governors were Creole Catholics, instead of Protestants.

As Catholics continue to constitute a significant fraction of Louisiana's population, they have continued to be influential in state politics. The high proportion and influence of the Catholic population makes Louisiana distinct among southern states. (Note: Other Southern states have longstanding indigenous Catholic populations, and Florida's largely Catholic population of Cuban emigres has been influential since the 1960s. Yet, Louisiana is still unusual or exceptional in its extent of aboriginal Catholic settlement and influence. Among states in the Deep South (discounting Florida's Panhandle and much of Texas) the historic role of Catholicism in Louisiana is unparalleled and unique. Among the states of the Union, Louisiana's unique use of the term parish (French la parouche or "la paroisse") for county is rooted in the pre-statehood role of Catholic church parishes in the administration of government.) The Roman Catholic Archdiocese of New Orleans, Diocese of Baton Rouge, and Diocese of Lafayette in Louisiana are the largest Catholic jurisdictions in Louisiana, located within the Greater New Orleans, Greater Baton Rouge, and Lafayette metropolitan statistical areas.

=== Non Christian ===
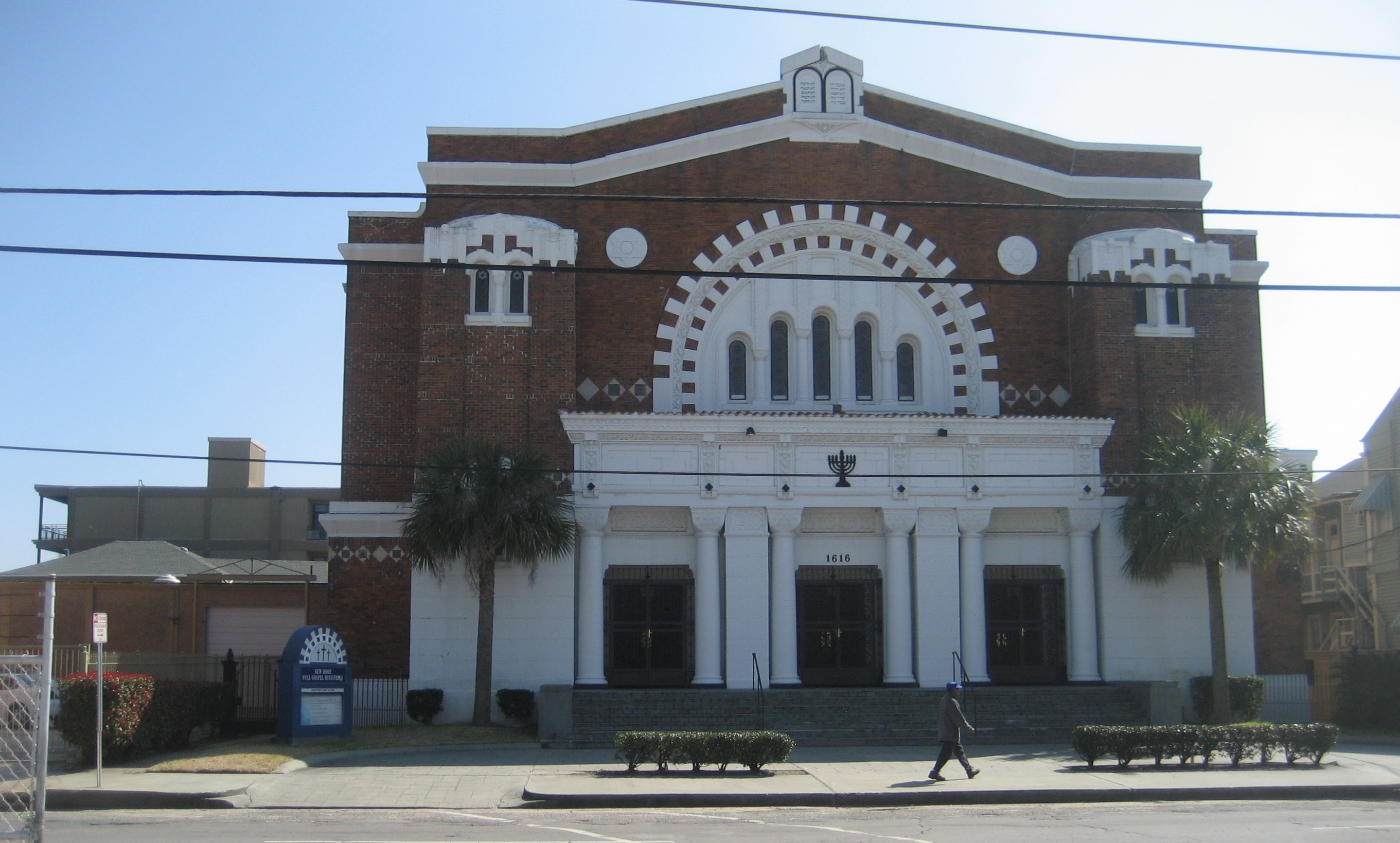
The Beth Israel synagogue in New Orleans

Outside of Christianity, Louisiana was among the southern states with a significant Jewish population before the 20th century. Virginia, South Carolina, and Georgia also had influential Jewish populations in some of their major cities from the 18th and 19th centuries. The earliest Jewish colonists were Sephardic Jews who immigrated to the Thirteen Colonies. Later in the 19th century, German Jews began to immigrate, followed by those from eastern Europe and the Russian Empire in the late 19th and early 20th centuries. Jewish communities are established in Louisiana's larger cities, notably New Orleans and Baton Rouge.

The most significant of these is the Jewish community of the New Orleans area. In 2000, before the 2005 Hurricane Katrina, its population was about 12,000. Dominant Jewish movements in Louisiana include Orthodox and Reform Judaism. In 2020, Reform Judaism was the largest Jewish tradition in Louisiana, with 5,891 Jews.

Prominent Jews in Louisiana's political leadership have included Whig (later Democrat) Judah P. Benjamin (1811–1884), who represented Louisiana in the U.S. Senate before the American Civil War and then became the Confederate secretary of state; Democrat-turned-Republican Michael Hahn who was elected as governor, serving 1864–1865 when Louisiana was occupied by the Union Army, and later elected in 1884 as a U.S. congressman; Democrat Adolph Meyer (1842–1908), Confederate Army officer who represented the state in the U.S. House of Representatives from 1891 until his death in 1908; Republican secretary of state Jay Dardenne (1954–), and Republican (Democrat before 2011) attorney general Buddy Caldwell (1946–).

Other non-Christian and non-Jewish religions with a continuous, historical presence in Louisiana have been Islam, Buddhism, and Hinduism. In the Shreveport–Bossier City metropolitan area, Muslims made up an estimated 14% of Louisiana's total Muslim population as of 2014. In 2020, there were 24,732 Muslims living in Louisiana. In 2021, the largest Islamic denominations in the major metropolises of Louisiana were Sunni Islam, non-denominational Islam and Quranism, Shia Islam, and the Nation of Islam.

In 2014, among Louisiana's irreligious community, 2% affiliated with atheism and 13% claimed no religion. In 2014, 10% of Louisiana's population practiced nothing in particular. In 2020, 19% were religiously unaffiliated.

== Vital statistics ==
Year	Population	Live births	Deaths	Natural change	Crude birth rate (per 1,000)	Crude death rate (per 1,000)	Natural change (per 1,000)	Crude migration change (per 1,000)
2000	4,471,885	67,898	41,138	26,760	15.2	9.2	6.0	
2001	4,477,875	65,352	41,757	23,595	14.6	9.3	5.3	-3.9
2002	4,497,267	64,872	41,984	22,888	14.4	9.3	5.1	-0.8
2003	4,521,042	65,040	42,719	22,321	14.4	9.4	4.9	0.3
2004	4,552,238	65,369	42,215	23,154	14.4	9.3	5.1	1.8
2005	4,576,628	60,937	44,355	16,582	13.3	9.7	3.6	1.7
2006	4,302,665	63,376	40,045	23,331	14.7	9.3	5.4	-69.1
2007	4,375,581	66,301	39,966	26,335	15.2	9.1	6.0	10.6
2008	4,435,586	65,268	41,220	24,048	14.7	9.3	5.4	8.1
2009	4,491,648	64,973	40,282	24,691	14.5	9.0	5.5	7.0
2010	4,544,804	62,379	40,667	21,712	13.7	8.9	4.8	6.9
2011	4,577,089	61,888	40,890	20,998	13.5	8.9	4.6	2.5
2012	4,603,590	62,642	42,320	20,322	13.6	9.2	4.4	1.3
2013	4,628,239	63,201	43,270	19,931	13.7	9.3	4.3	1.0
2014	4,648,813	64,497	43,869	20,628	13.9	9.4	4.4	0.0
2015	4,670,550	64,692	43,716	20,976	13.9	9.4	4.5	0.2
2016	4,685,576	63,178	44,306	18,872	13.5	9.5	4.0	-0.8
2017	4,678,580	61,018	45,804	15,214	13.0	9.8	3.3	-4.7
2018	4,670,033	59,615	46,048	13,567	12.8	9.9	2.9	-4.7
2019	4,664,544	58,941	45,938	13,003	12.6	9.8	2.8	-4.0
2020	4,652,145	57,328	56,752	576	12.3	12.2	0.1	-2.8
2021	4,628,595	57,437	57,533	-96	12.4	12.4	-0.0	-5.1
2022	4,600,892	56,479	52,339	4,140	12.3	11.4	0.9	-6.9
2023	4,598,777	54,927	49,437	5,490	11.9	10.8	1.2	-1.7
2024	4,614,878	53,305	49,183	4,122	11.6	10.7	0.9	2.6
2025	4,618,189	51,543	48,333	3,210	11.2	10.5	0.7	0.0
