= Brown Dense =

Geologic formation in the United States

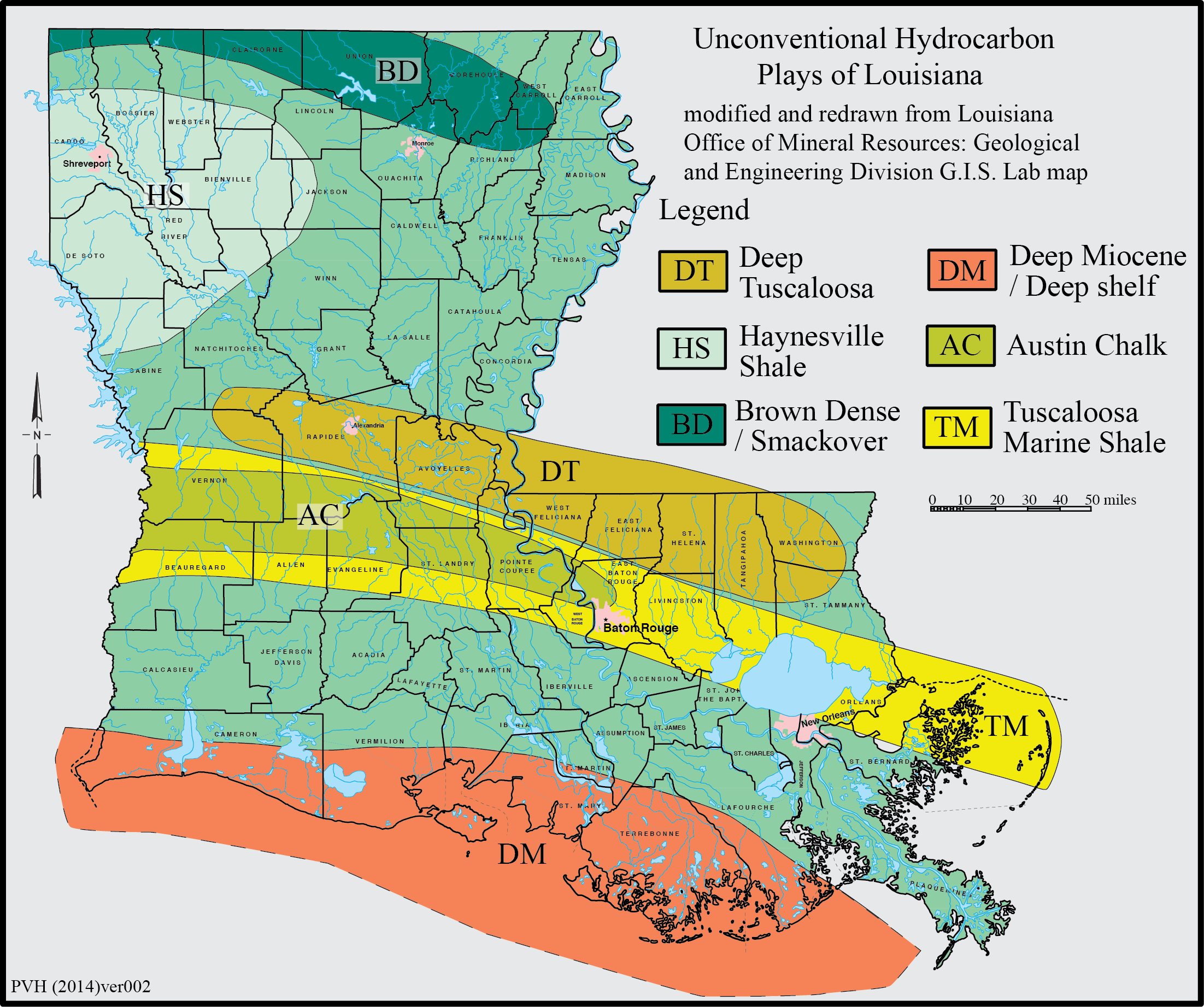
Map showing distribution of Brown Dense and other Unconventional Hydrocarbon Plays within Louisiana

The Brown Dense limestone is an informal name used by petroleum geologists for a layer of rock that lies beneath large parts of southern Arkansas and northwest Louisiana. The Brown Dense is a 300- to 500-foot thick interval within organic-rich, fine-grained carbonate rock that comprise the Lower Member of the Smackover Formation. Within this area, the Lower Smackover Member lies at depths of 8,000 to 10,000 feet beneath the land surface.

== Source of Name ==
The term “Brown Dense” possibly came from a description of the Lower Member of the Smackover Formation by W. B. Weeks. He described it as “gray to brown, dense, cryptocrystalline limestone.” This description incorrectly implied a nonporous, non-permeable unit that lacks any potential for oil and gas production, which has discouraged until recently the exploration for oil and gas in this unit.

== Lithology ==
The Lower Member of the Smackover Formation, of which the Brown Dense is a part, consists of organic-rich limestone, which in places contains as much as 50 feet of sandstone and 100 feet of dolomite with excellent porosity and permeability beneath parts of southern Arkansas and northern Louisiana. Typically, the Lower Member of the Smackover consists of limestone composed of a sequence, from bottom to top, of laminated mudstone, thin-bedded mudstone, burrowed mudstone, and wackestone. The Brown Dense consists of the thin-bedded and burrowed mudstone. These mudstones were a prolific source of oil and gas for a significant amount of the oil and gas found in reservoirs in this part of the Gulf of Mexico.

== Depositional Environment ==
The Brown Dense accumulated on the bottom of a prehistoric stratified Gulf of Mexico. The upper part of the water column was well-oxygenated and subject to frequent algal blooms. Underlying these oxygenated waters and separated by a pycnocline, were anoxic and hypersaline bottom waters, which preserved organic matter as it accumulated. The organic matter consisted of algal material that fell downward from the overlying oxygenated waters.

== Age ==
As part of the Smackover Formation, the Brown Dense is Oxfordian in age, 161 to 156 million years ago.

== Economic importance ==
Estimates for the total amount of reserves of oil and natural gas in the Brown Dense (limestone) are unavailable. However, various organizations, i.e. the Louisiana Natural Resources Department and Louisiana Oil and Gas Association, argue that it is a very promising new source of significant economic reserves of oil and natural gas. Petroleum companies, i.e. the Oklahoma City-based Devon Energy and Southwestern Energy have leased land in both Arkansas and Louisiana for drilling for oil and natural gas within the Brown Dense.

== See also ==
- Haynesville Shale
