= Seal of Louisiana =

Official government emblem of the U.S. state of Louisiana

Great Seal of the State of Louisiana

Versions
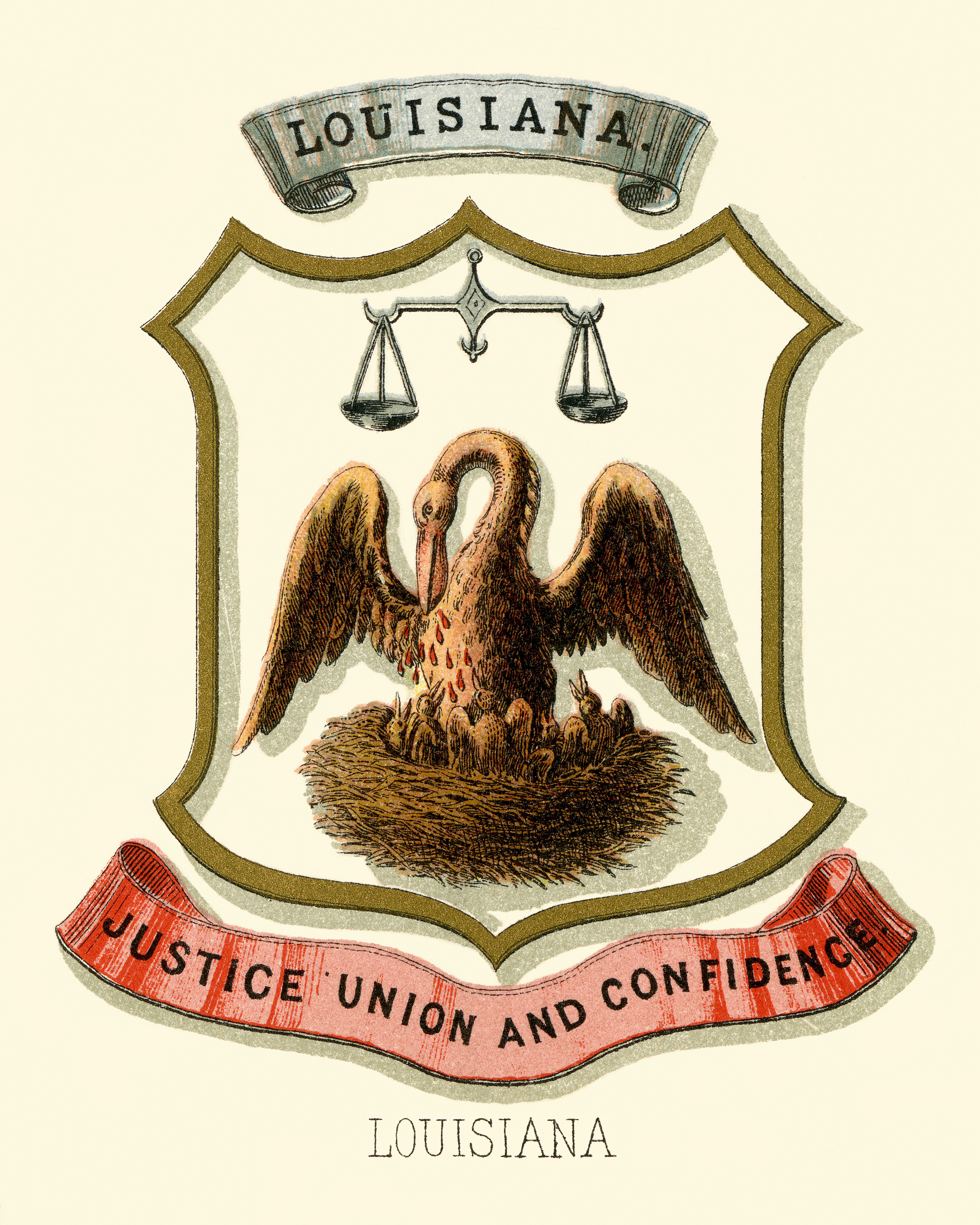
- Historical coat of arms (1876)
- Armiger: State of Louisiana
- Adopted: 2006
- Motto: Union, Justice, Confidence
- Earlier version: 1812, 1902

The Seal of Louisiana is the official government emblem of the U.S. state of Louisiana. Originally devised in 1812, the latest version was enacted in 2006.

== History ==
Following the Louisiana Purchase in 1803, the area that would later comprise the State of Louisiana was established as the Territory of Orleans. President Thomas Jefferson appointed William C. C. Claiborne as governor and he was authorized by the territory's legislative council to design an official government seal. He produced a seal depicting an eagle holding a laurel wreath with fifteen stars to represent the states of the Union. When Louisiana became a state in 1812, the seal was changed to a pelican on its nest, plucking at its breast to draw blood to feed its young, a device known as the "pelican in her piety". Why the seal was changed from an eagle to a pelican is unknown, but it might have to honor the state's Catholic heritage. Claiborne had married into a Catholic Louisiana family and had helped to incorporate Catholics into the political mainstream, during a time of intense anti-Catholicism elsewhere in the US.

During the Civil War, with Louisiana divided, the Confederate and Union governors both used pelican seals: one with the head turned to the left, the other to the right and one with a nest full of chicks and one with just four chicks. In the pro-Union part of the state (which included New Orleans and 13 parishes), the motto "Justice, Union and Confidence" was changed to "Union, Justice and Confidence".

On April 30, 1902, a standardized description of the Great Seal of the State of Louisiana was provided by Governor W. W. Heard to Secretary of State John T. Michel, who was charged with ensuring all state departments used the seal as he described it: "A Pelican, with its head turned to the left, in a nest with three young; the Pelican, following the tradition, in act of tearing its breast to fed its young; around the edge of the Seal to be inscribed 'State of Louisiana.' Over the head of the Pelican to be inscribed 'Union, Justice,' etc.; under the nest of the Pelican to be inscribed 'Confidence.'" Michel noted that this was the first order to legitimize the state's seal.

During the 19th century it was traditional in Louisiana flags and the state seal for the "pelican in her piety" to have three drops of blood on her chest. However, in later years the tradition (on both the state flag and seal) had been haphazardly followed, which was noticed by an eighth-grader at Vandebilt Catholic High School in Houma who brought this to the attention of his state legislator. The issue was resolved in April 2006, when the Louisiana State Legislature passed a bill (House Bill 833/Act 92) which requires three drops of blood to be depicted on the pelican used in both the state's flag and seal.

== Historical Coats of Arms of Louisiana ==
French Louisiana

Coat of arms of New France

Coat of arms of Louisiana (New Spain)

== Historical seals of Louisiana ==
Former seal design (1804–1812)

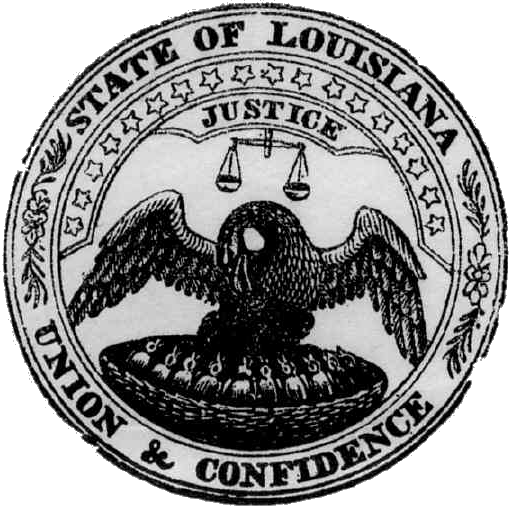
Former seal design (1812–1876)

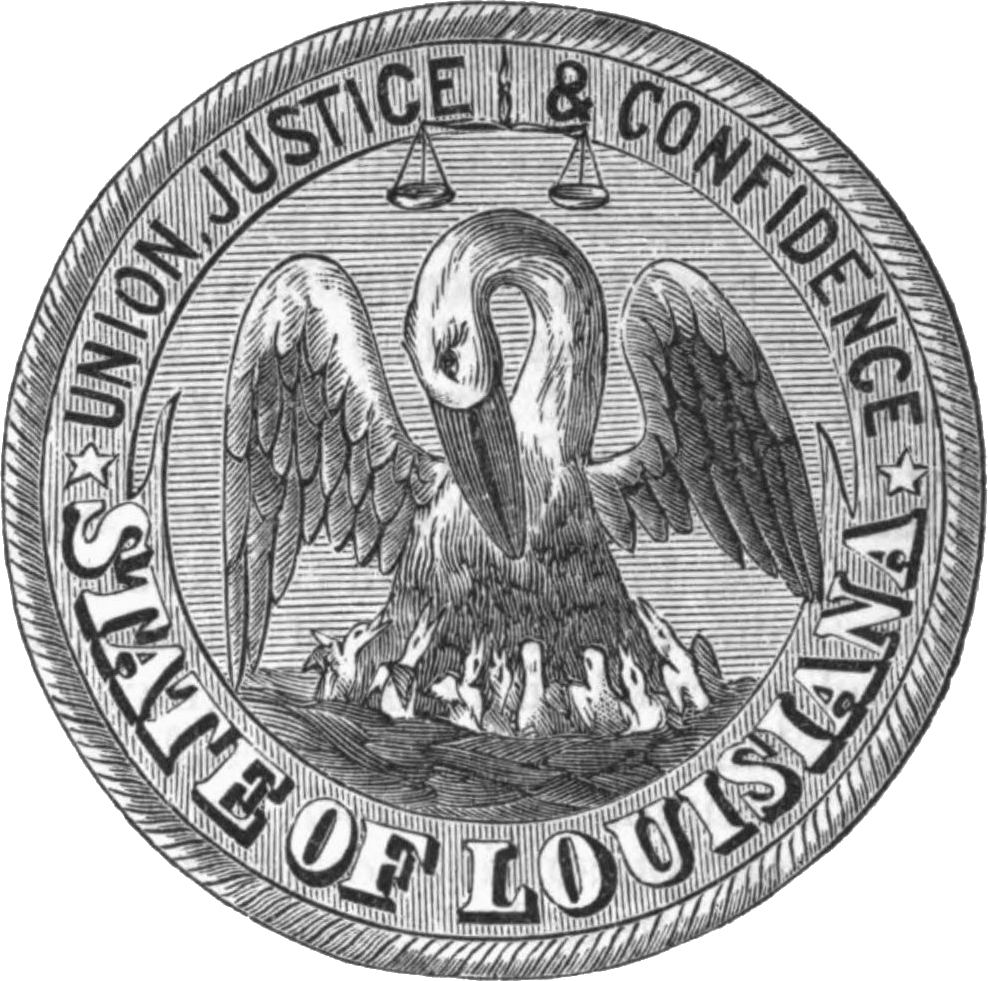
Former seal design (1879)

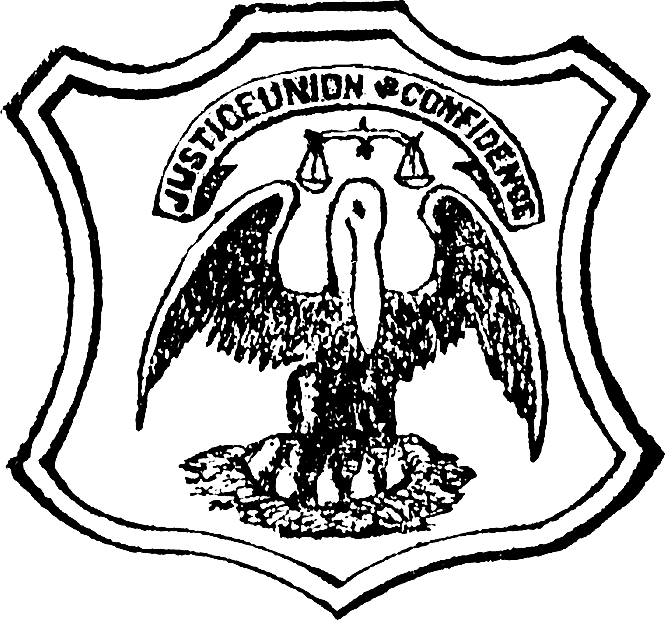
Former seal design (1879–1890)

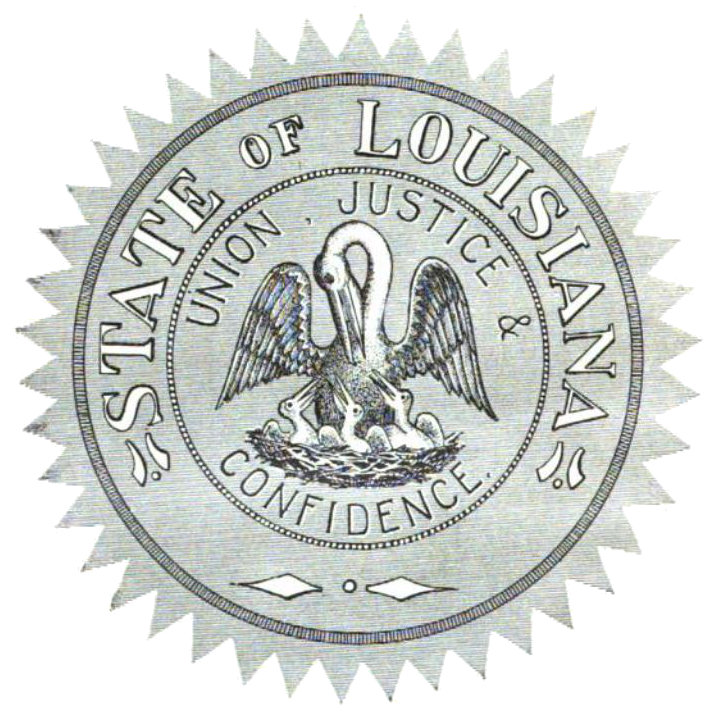
Former seal design established in 1902

Former seal design (1890–2006)

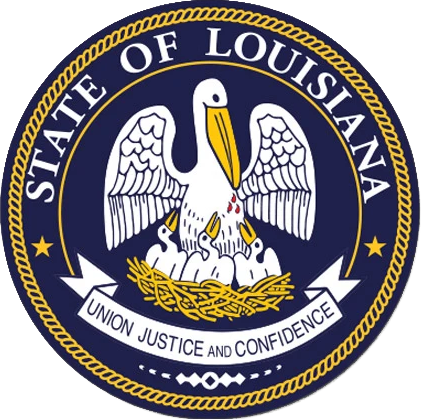
Former seal design (2006–2010)

== Government seals of Louisiana ==
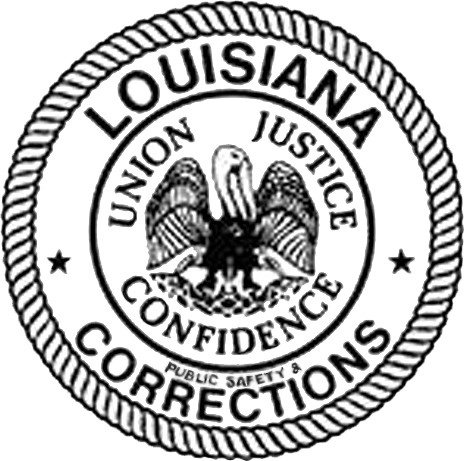
Seal of the Louisiana Department of Public Safety and Corrections
