= List of college athletic programs in Louisiana =

This is a list of college athletic programs in the U.S. state of Louisiana.

== NCAA ==
=== Division I ===
Full NCAA Division I member colleges in Louisiana.
- FBS Football, - FCS Football, - Non-football

| Team | School | City | Conference | Sport sponsorship | | | | | | |
| Team | School | City | Conference | Football | Basketball | | Baseball | Softball | Soccer | |
| Team | School | City | Conference | Football | M | W | Baseball | Softball | M | W |
|---|---|---|---|---|---|---|---|---|---|---|
| Grambling State Tigers | Grambling State University | Grambling | SWAC | FCS | Yes | Yes | Yes | Yes | No | Yes |
| Louisiana Ragin' Cajuns | University of Louisiana at Lafayette | Lafayette | Sun Belt | FBS | Yes | Yes | Yes | Yes | No | Yes |
| Louisiana Tech Bulldogs and Lady Techsters | Louisiana Tech University | Ruston | C-USA | FBS | Yes | Yes | Yes | Yes | No | Yes |
| LSU Tigers and Lady Tigers | Louisiana State University | Baton Rouge | SEC | FBS | Yes | Yes | Yes | Yes | No | Yes |
| LSU New Orleans Privateers | LSU New Orleans | New Orleans | Southland | No | Yes | Yes | Yes | No | No | No |
| McNeese Cowboys and Cowgirls | McNeese State University | Lake Charles | Southland | FCS | Yes | Yes | Yes | Yes | No | Yes |
| Nicholls Colonels | Nicholls State University | Thibodaux | Southland | FCS | Yes | Yes | Yes | Yes | No | Yes |
| Northwestern State Demons and Lady Demons | Northwestern State University | Natchitoches | Southland | FCS | Yes | Yes | Yes | Yes | No | Yes |
| Southeastern Louisiana Lions and Lady Lions | Southeastern Louisiana University | Hammond | Southland | FCS | Yes | Yes | Yes | Yes | No | Yes |
| Southern Jaguars and Lady Jaguars | Southern University | Baton Rouge | SWAC | FCS | Yes | Yes | Yes | Yes | No | Yes |
| Tulane Green Wave | Tulane University | New Orleans | AAC | FBS | Yes | Yes | Yes | No | No | No |
| ULM Warhawks | University of Louisiana at Monroe | Monroe | Sun Belt | FBS | Yes | Yes | Yes | Yes | No | Yes |

=== Division III ===
Full NCAA Division III member colleges in Louisiana.
- Football

| Team | School | City | Conference | Sport sponsorship | | | | | | |
| Team | School | City | Conference | Football | Basketball | | Baseball | Softball | Soccer | |
| Team | School | City | Conference | Football | M | W | Baseball | Softball | M | W |
|---|---|---|---|---|---|---|---|---|---|---|
| Centenary Gentlemen and Ladies | Centenary College of Louisiana | Shreveport | SCAC | Yes | Yes | Yes | Yes | Yes | Yes | Yes |

== NAIA ==
Full NAIA member colleges in Louisiana.
- Football, - Non-Football

| Team | School | City | Conference | Sport sponsorship | | | | | | |
| Team | School | City | Conference | Football | Basketball | | Baseball | Softball | Soccer | |
| Team | School | City | Conference | Football | M | W | Baseball | Softball | M | W |
|---|---|---|---|---|---|---|---|---|---|---|
| Dillard Bleu Devils and Lady Bleu Devils | Dillard University | New Orleans | HBCU | No | Yes | Yes | Yes | No | No | No |
| Louisiana Christian Wildcats | Louisiana Christian University | Pineville | Red River (Note: Louisiana Christian's football team competes in the Sooner Athletic Conference.) | Yes | Yes | Yes | Yes | Yes | Yes | Yes |
| Loyola Wolf Pack | Loyola University New Orleans | New Orleans | SSAC | No | Yes | Yes | Yes | No | No | No |
| LSU-Alexandria Generals | Louisiana State University of Alexandria | Alexandria | Red River | No | Yes | Yes | Yes | Yes | Yes | Yes |
| LSU-Shreveport Pilots | Louisiana State University Shreveport | Shreveport | Red River | No | Yes | Yes | Yes | No | Yes | Yes |
| Southern-New Orleans Knights and Lady Knights | Southern University at New Orleans | New Orleans | HBCU | No | Yes | Yes | No | No | No | No |
| Xavier Gold Rush and Gold Nuggets | Xavier University of Louisiana | New Orleans | Red River | No | Yes | Yes | Yes | Yes | No | No |

== NJCAA ==
Full NJCAA member colleges in Louisiana.
- Non-Football

| Team | School | City | Conference |
|---|---|---|---|
| Bossier Parish Cavaliers and Lady Cavs | Bossier Parish Community College | Bossier City | SJCC |
| BRCC Bears | Baton Rouge Community College | Baton Rouge | LCCAC |
| Delgado Dolphins | Delgado Community College | New Orleans | LCCAC |
| LSU-Eunice Bengals and Lady Bengals | Louisiana State University at Eunice | Eunice | LCCAC |
| Nunez Pelicans | Nunez Community College | Chalmette | LCCAC |
| Port City Jaguars and Lady Jaguars | Southern University at Shreveport | Shreveport | LCCAC |

== See also ==
- List of NCAA Division I institutions
- List of NCAA Division II institutions
- List of NCAA Division III institutions
- List of NAIA institutions
- List of USCAA institutions
- List of NCCAA institutions
- List of NJCAA Division I institutions
- List of NJCAA Division II institutions
- List of NJCAA Division III institutions
