= "Rags" Scheuermann Field at Kirsch-Rooney Stadium =

1,000-seat baseball park in New Orleans, Louisiana

- Kirsch-Rooney
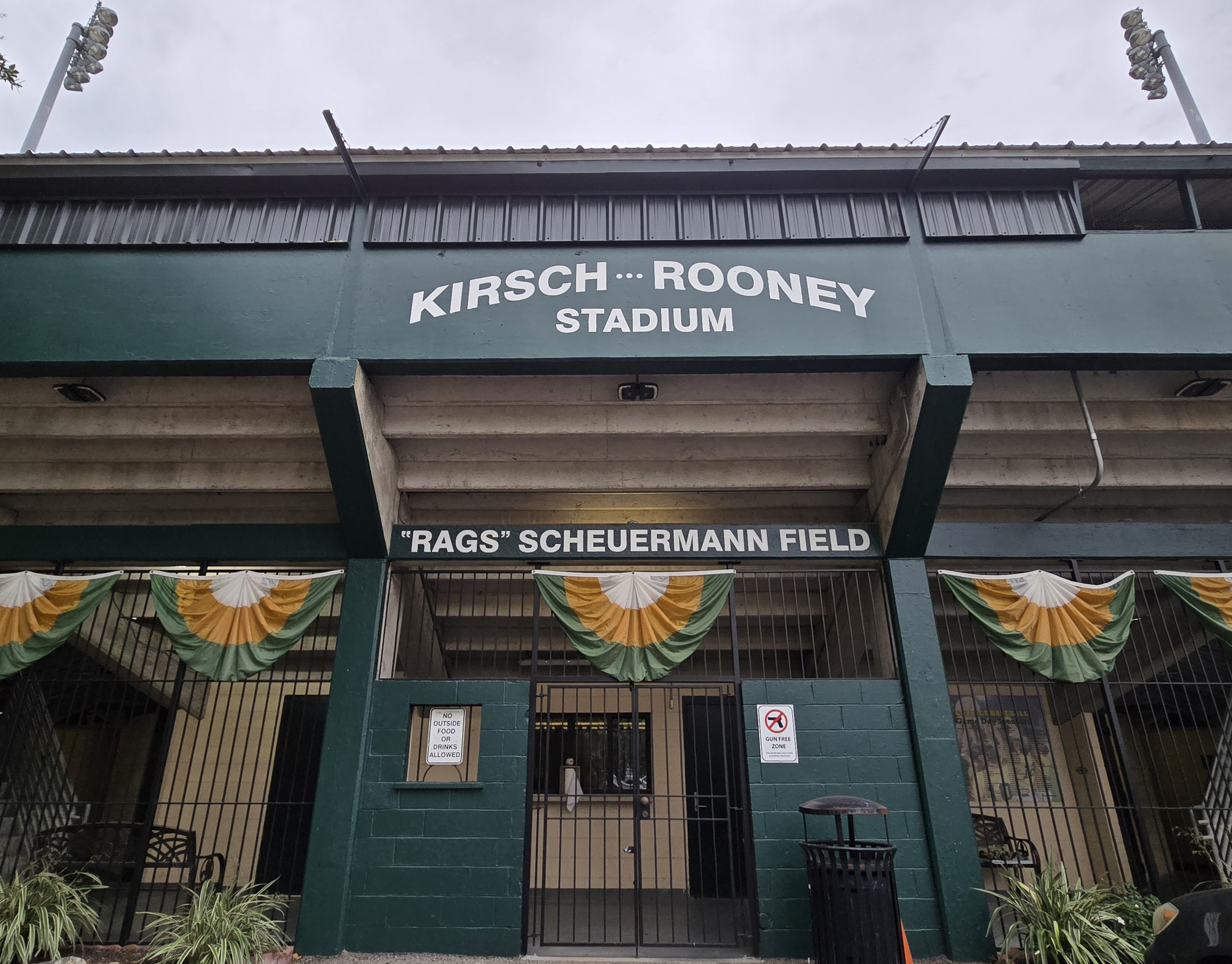
- Interactive map of "Rags" Scheuermann Field at Kirsch-Rooney Stadium
- Location: 5401 General Diaz St; New Orleans, LA 70124
- Coordinates: 29.98688°N 90.1064°W
- Operator: Delgado Community College
- Capacity: 1,000
- Surface: Grass
- Field size: Left Field: 325 feet (99 m); Center Field: 400 feet (120 m); Right Field: 325 feet (99 m)

Construction
- Opened: June 19, 1957
- Cost: $70 thousand

Tenants
- Delgado Community College (baseball) (NJCAA) (1957-present); LHSAA (baseball) (1957-present); American Legion Baseball (1957-present); American Legion Baseball World Series (1984); SWAC baseball tournaments; NJCAA Region 23 Tournament (2011)

"Rags" Scheuermann Field at Kirsch-Rooney Stadium is a 1,000-seat baseball park in New Orleans, Louisiana. It is the home stadium for the Delgado Community College Dolphins baseball team that competes in the National Junior College Athletic Association. The stadium is also home to Louisiana High School Athletic Association baseball and American Legion Baseball.

== History ==
Kirsch-Rooney Stadium is named after Cyril Kirsch and Robert Rooney, Purple Heart recipients and New Orleans natives, who died in World War II. Louis "Rags" Scheuermann, the longtime and original head coach and stadium manager of the Delgado Dolphins, is honored by having the field bear his name.

The stadium has hosted two Major League Baseball (MLB) exhibition series, one between the Cleveland Indians and Cincinnati Reds on April 6–7, 1967 and the other between the Atlanta Braves and Baltimore Orioles on April 1, 1974. In the series between the Cleveland Indians and Cincinnati Reds, future MLB managers Dusty Baker and Davey Johnson of the Indians hit home runs and Pete Rose played in the series for the Reds. In the Braves/Orioles game, Hank Aaron hit a home run, which was three days prior to his tying Babe Ruth's lifetime homerun record at 714 home runs at the Braves' home opener.

Other Major Leaguers that have played at the stadium include Tony Pérez, Jim Palmer, Brooks Robinson, Don Baylor, Rusty Staub, and Will Clark.

The stadium hosted the 1984 American Legion Baseball World Series, multiple Southwestern Athletic Conference baseball tournaments and 2011 National Junior College Athletic Association Region 23 baseball tournament.

== Gallery ==
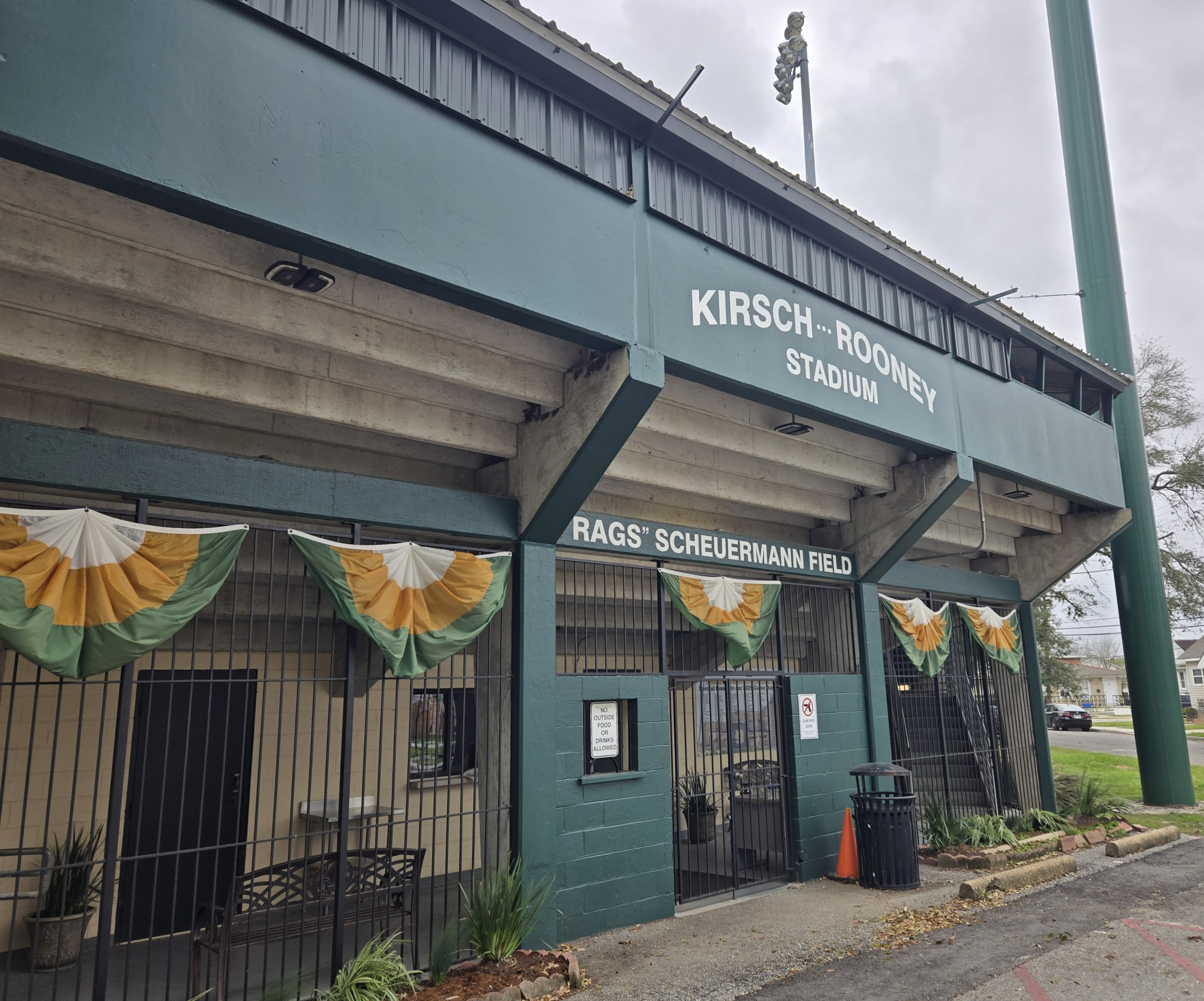
Rags Scheuermann Field at Kirsch-Rooney Stadium Main Entrance

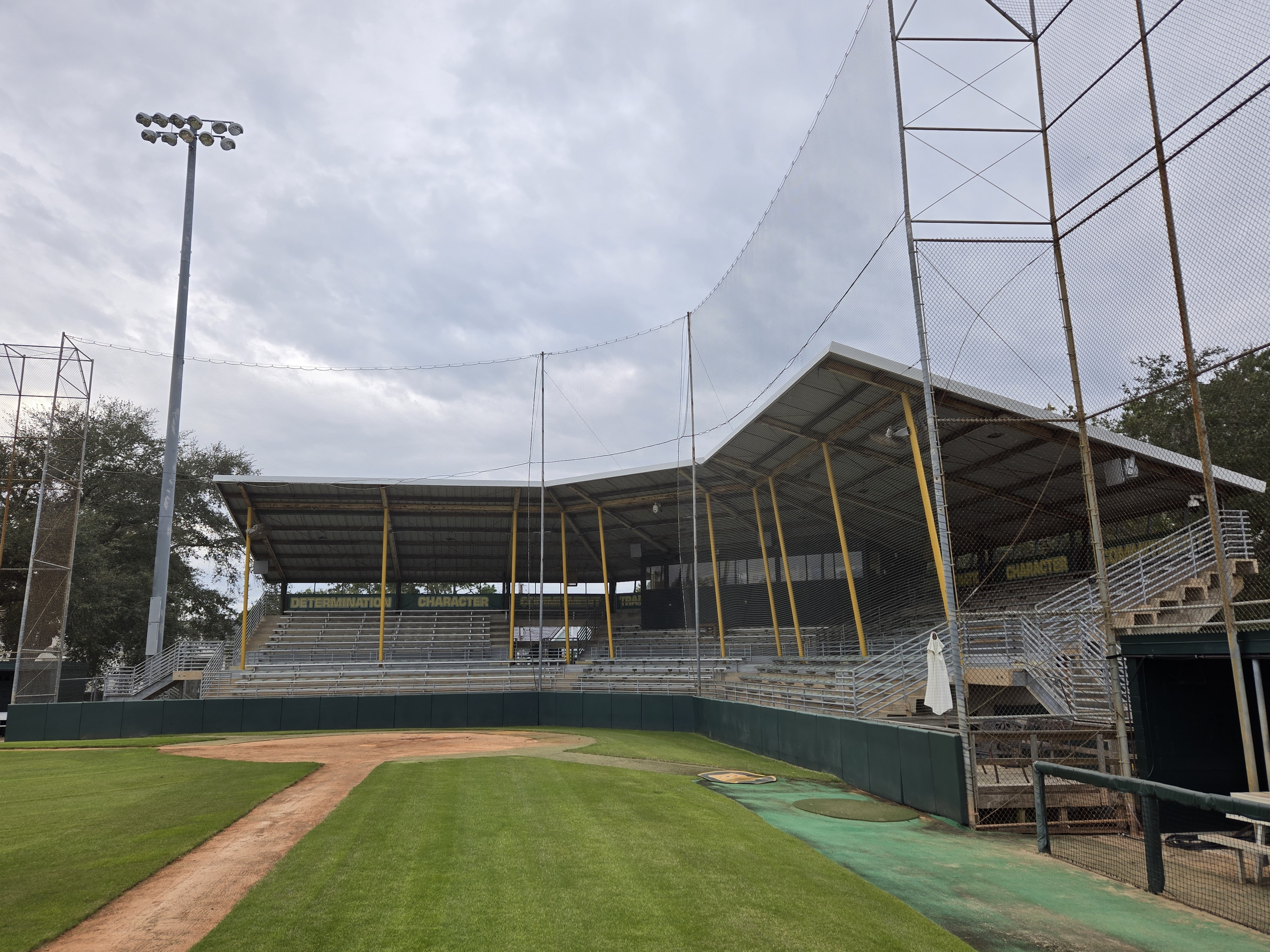
Rags Scheuermann Field at Kirsch-Rooney Stadium Grandstand

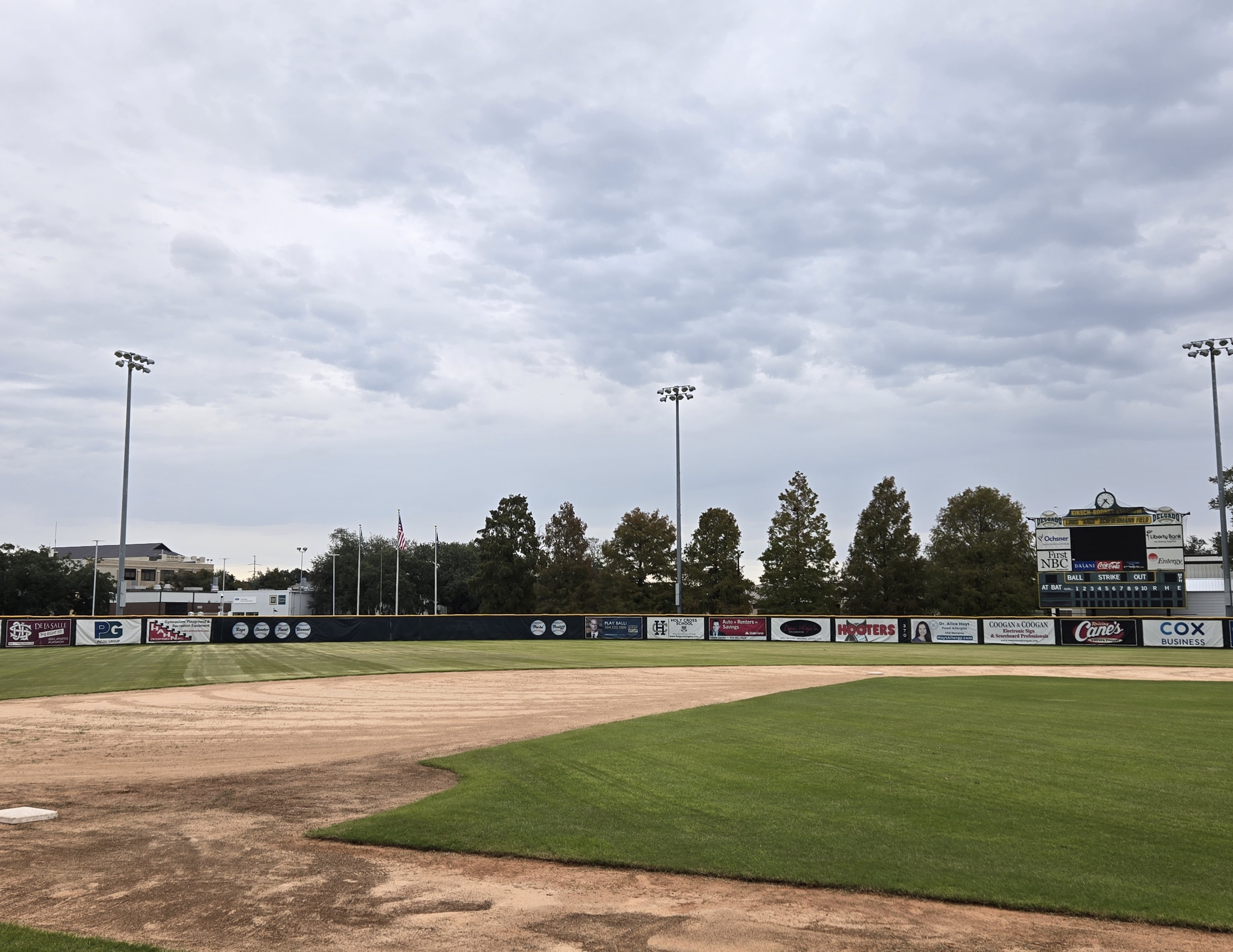
Rags Scheuermann Field at Kirsch-Rooney Stadium Outfield

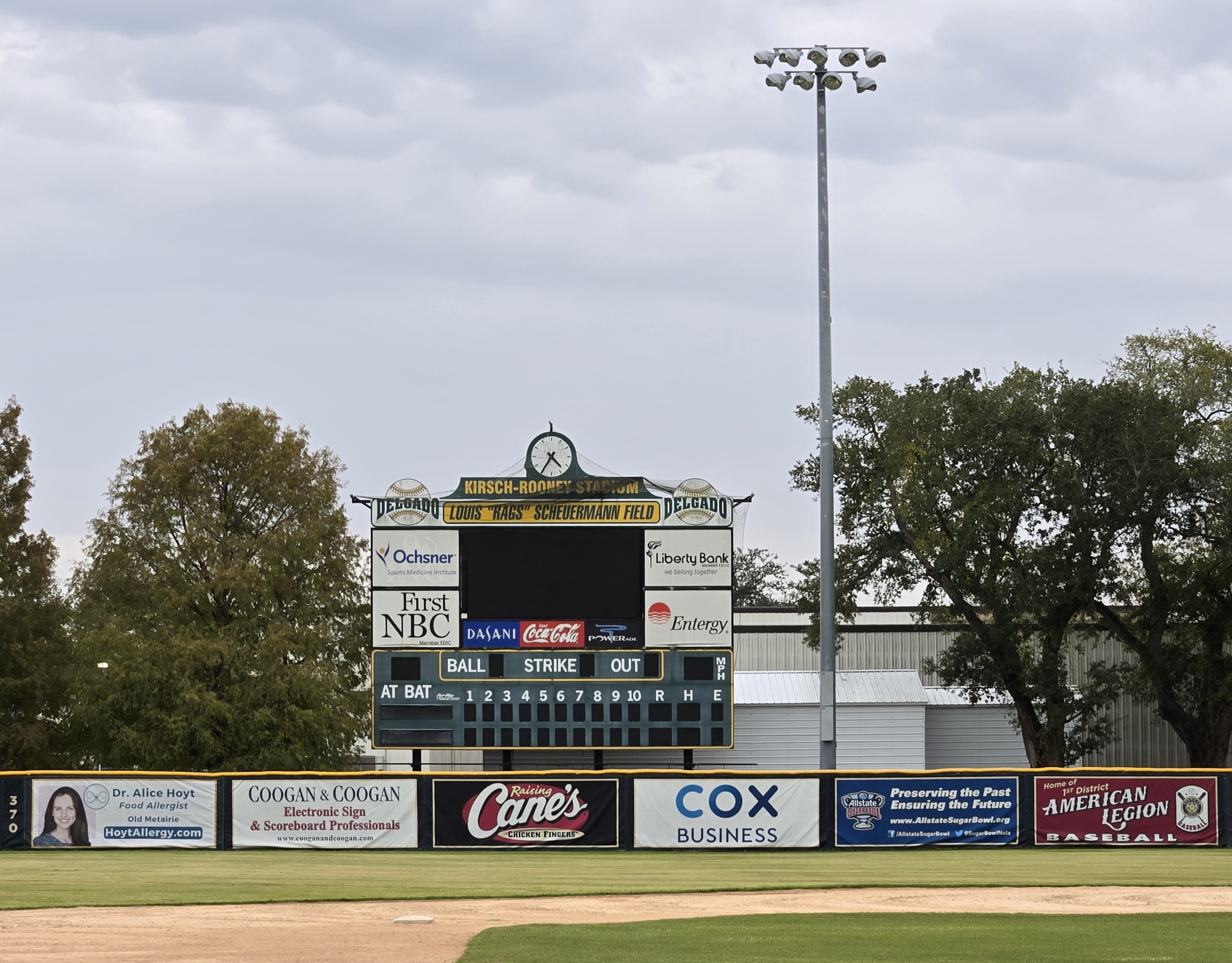
Rags Scheuermann Field at Kirsch-Rooney Stadium Scoreboard

== See also ==
- Delgado Community College
