= Neighborhoods in Baton Rouge, Louisiana =

Baton Rouge, Louisiana has many historic neighborhoods, dating back as far as the early 19th century.

- Downtown - Baton Rouge's central business district.
- Spanish Town - Located between the Mississippi River and I-110, it is one of the city's more diverse neighborhoods and home to the State Capitol and the city's largest Mardi Gras Parade.
- Beauregard Town - A historic district between the downtown area and Old South Baton Rouge. Many of the homes have been renovated and are used as law offices.
- Garden District - The Garden District is located in Baton Rouge's Mid-City area where Park Boulevard intersects Government Street. The Garden District is an established historic area with many upscale homes.
- Old South Baton Rouge - An old section of the city directly south of downtown and Beauregard Town, it stretches south from I-10 and along the river to Brightside Lane. After years of neglect and a crumbling infrastructure, the city is targeting the neighborhood in the city's largest ever revitalization project.
- LSU/Lakeshore - Home to LSU's main campus, the University Lakes and the City Park lake. It includes neighborhoods like University Hills, University Gardens, College Town, State Street, Carlotta Street, and Arlington. Homes directly on the lakeshore are some of the most expensive within the city limits, and the lakeshore itself is a popular place for jogging, walking and bicycling.
- Mid-City - Bound by I-110 on the west, College and N. Foster on the east, Choctaw to the north and I-10 to the south. It includes several neighborhoods like Ogden Park, Bernard Terrace, and Capital Heights. Always a socially and economically diverse area, Mid City is quickly regaining popularity due to urban renewal and gentrification. Includes historic Baton Rouge Magnet High School. Mid-City is also where a large number of Baton Rouge's LGBT community resides.
- Goodwood - an older neighborhood located in Mid City South between Government Street, Jefferson Highway, Airline Highway, and Lobdell Blvd.
- Bocage - an older, well-established neighborhood located in Mid City South between Corporate Blvd, Jefferson Highway, Essen Lane and I-10. It features upscale shopping, small specialty food stores, popular restaurants, and a member-owned racket club.
- Tara - an older neighborhood located in Mid City South between Goodwood Blvd, Old Hammond Hwy, Jefferson Hwy, and Lobdell Blvd. Includes Tara High School and LaSalle Elementary.

Airline Highway, and Old Hammond Highway.

- McDonald Land - Bordered by Plank Rd to the West, N. Foster Dr to the East, Airline Hwy to the North and Hollywood St to the South.
- Brookstown - Is bordered by Airline Highway to the east, Hollywood St to the north, McClelland St to the west and Evangeline St to the south.
- Melrose Place - Melrose Place is home to BRCC and is between N. Ardenwood and N. Foster Rd.
- Melrose East - Is bordered by Florida Blvd (US 190) to the south, Renoir Drive to the north, Lobdell Boulevard to the east, and N. Ardenwood Dr to the west. This residential enclave consists mostly of apartment buildings. Once one of the worst neighborhoods in the country, it is rapidly rebounding due to the efforts of the Melrose East Community Association and the Melrose East Crime Prevention District.
- Inniswold - Area around Bluebonnet Rd between Jefferson Hwy and I-10.
- Poets Corner - Originally platted as "Addition to Suburb Hundred Oaks" in 1920, this small, eclectic neighborhood is located between the Perkins Road Overpass, City Park, Kansas City Southern rail line, and the Hundred Oaks Subdivision. A small neighborhood with much personality. Originally a farm and pasture land at the turn of the century. Smaller homes than those in the surrounding area with many built between 1920-1960s.
- Southdowns - an older subdivision located between Perkins Road and Bayou Duplantier, also between the University Lake and Pollard Estates. Hosts one of Baton Rouge's Mardi Gras parades, on the Friday night before Mardi Gras.
- Gardere - an area using Gardere Lane (LA Highway 327 Spur) as its main artery. Found between Nicholson Drive and Highland Road, located near St. Jude the Apostle Church. Dominated by low-rent housing prior to Hurricane Katrina.
- Westminster - Between Essen and Bluebonnet off Jefferson Highway, around the Baton Rouge Country Club.
- Oak Hills Place - Bordered by Bluebonnet Boulevard to the west, Perkins Road to the north, and Highland Road to the south. South of the Mall of Louisiana.
- Broadmoor - A mostly mid-century neighborhood established in 1950 and home to Broadmoor High School.
- Scotlandville - The largest section of north Baton Rouge. The area is bounded by Plank Road to the east, Thomas Road to the north, the Mississippi river to the west, and Airline Hwy to the south, and surrounds the Southern University campus and the Exxon chemical plants.
- Shenandoah - A very large subdivision built in the 1970s and 1980s, located between South Harrell's Ferry and Tiger Bend Roads with its westernmost boundary Jones Creek Road. All streets in this neighborhood are named after key figures and battles in the Civil War (e.g. Harper's Ferry, Chadsford, etc.). Schools in this subdivision include Shenandoah Elementary and St. Michael the Archangel.
- Sherwood Forest - A large, established neighborhood with large, older homes. Immediately east of "Broadmoor." Old Hammond Hwy. is to the south, Flannery Rd. is to the east, Florida Blvd. is to the north, and Sharp Rd. is to the west. Sherwood Forest Citizens Association
- Brownfields - located near Baker off Committee Drive and bounded between Foster Road and Plank Road.
- Zion City - Between Hooper Road and Airline Highway.
- Monticello - located off Greenwell Springs Road between the Baton Rouge City Limits and Central City, site of Greenbriar Elementary School.
- Park Forest - located across from Monticello on North Sherwood Forest Blvd and Greenwell Springs. All streets are named after natural wonders.
- Glen Oaks - located in northern Baton Rouge between Mickens Road and Airline Highway, site of Glen Oaks High School.
- University Club - A newer neighborhood built inside the University Club Golf course located off Nicholson Drive on the south edge of Baton Rouge.
- Centurion Place - A neighborhood off O'neal Lane that has many upscale homes.
- Northdale - Extends from N.15th St. to Scenic HWY, left to right is Foss St. to Choctaw St.
