= University Hills =

University Hills may refer to:

- University Hills, Irvine, California
- University Hills, Los Angeles, California
- University Hills, one of the neighborhoods of Denver, Colorado
- University Hills, one of the neighborhoods of Baton Rouge, Louisiana
- University Hills, a trailer park in Starkville, Mississippi, damaged by Hurricane Rita
- University Hills, a dig site at Agate Fossil Beds National Monument, Nebraska
- University Hills, one of the neighborhoods of Toledo, Ohio
- University Hills, a ZIP code in Caloocan, Philippines

== See also ==
- University Hill (disambiguation)
