= NJCAA Region 23 =

Region XXIII of the National Junior College Athletic Association (NJCAA) consists of two junior college athletic conferences: the Louisiana Community Colleges Athletic Conference (LCCAC) and the Mississippi Association of Community & Junior Colleges (MACCC).

== Member schools ==
=== LCCAC members ===
The LCCAC currently has five full members, all are public schools:

Institution	Location (Note: All locations are within the State of Louisiana.)	Founded	Affiliation	Enrollment	Nickname	Joined
Baton Rouge Community College	Baton Rouge	1995	Public (Note: Part of the Louisiana Community and Technical College System.)	8,000	Bears	?
Delgado Community College	New Orleans	1921	Public	19,000	Dolphins	?
Louisiana State University at Eunice	Eunice	1964	Public (Note: Part of the Louisiana State University System.)	4,074	Bengals	?
Nunez Community College	Chalmette	1992	Public	2,166	Pelicans	?
Southern University at Shreveport	Shreveport	1967	Public (Note: Part of the Southern University System.)	3,014	Jaguars	?

=== MACCC members ===
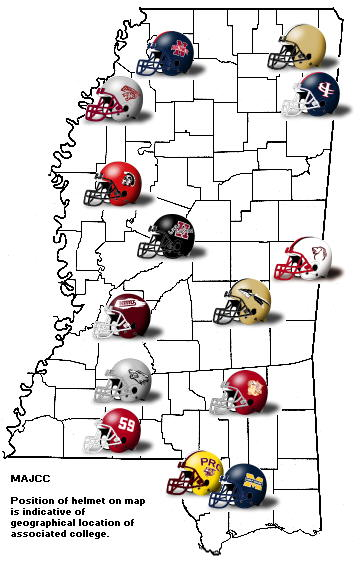
Map showing location of MACCC schools with football helmets indicating location.

The MACCC currently has 15 full members, all are public schools:

Institution	Location (Note: All locations are within the State of Mississippi.)	Founded	Affiliation	Enrollment	Nickname	Joined	Division
Coahoma Community College	Clarksdale	1949	Public (Note: Part of the Mississippi Community College Board.)	1,612	Tigers	?	North
Copiah–Lincoln Community College	Wesson	1928	Public	3,929	Wolf Pack	?	South
East Central Community College	Decatur	1928	Public	3,049	Warriors	?	South
East Mississippi Community College	Scooba	1927	Public	5,433	Lions	?	North
Hinds Community College	Raymond	1917	Public	12,811	Eagles	?	South
Holmes Community College	Goodman	1911	Public	5,409	Bulldogs	?	North
Itawamba Community College	Fulton	1948	Public	5,654	Indians	?	North
Jones College (Note: Also known as Jones County Junior College.)	Ellisville	1911	Public	4,778	Bobcats	?	South
Meridian Community College (Note: Non-football full member.)	Meridian	1937	Public	3,435	Eagles	2002	South
Mississippi Delta Community College	Moorhead	1927	Public	3,491	Trojans	?	North
Mississippi Gulf Coast Community College	Perkinston	1911	Public	8,677	Bulldogs	?	South
Northeast Mississippi Community College	Booneville	1948	Public	3,400	Tigers	?	North
Northwest Mississippi Community College	Senatobia	1927	Public	6,607	Rangers	?	North
Pearl River Community College	Poplarville	1909	Public	5,731	Wildcats	?	South
Southwest Mississippi Community College	Summit	1908	Public	2,128	Bears	?	South
