= University Hill =

University Hill may refer to several places:

== United States ==
- University Hill, Boulder, Colorado
- University Hill, Syracuse, New York
- University Hill, Columbia, South Carolina

== Other countries ==
- University Hill, Bundoora, Victoria, Australia
- University Endowment Lands, or University Hill, Vancouver, British Columbia, Canada
  - University Hill Secondary School

== See also ==
- University Hills (disambiguation)
