= WXDR-LP =

- New Orleans, Louisiana; United States
- Frequency: 99.1 MHz
- Branding: Dolphin Radio

Programming
- Format: Free-form radio
- Affiliations: Pacifica Radio Network

Ownership
- Owner: Delgado Community College

History
- First air date: 2014
- Former frequencies: 98.9 MHz (2014–2018)

Technical information
- Licensing authority: FCC
- Facility ID: 191878
- Class: L1
- ERP: 65 watts
- HAAT: 37.2 meters (122 ft)
- Transmitter coordinates: 29°59′14.4″N 90°6′16.4″W

Links
- Public license information: LMS
- Website: dolphinradio.org

WXDR-LP (99.1 FM) was a non-commercial campus radio station licensed to Delgado Community College in New Orleans. The station was branded as "Dolphin Radio", a reference to the college's dolphin mascot. It was operated by the students, faculty and staff of Delgado Community College.

Dolphin Radio began operation in August 2011 on 1610 AM and 96.3 FM under Part 15 of the FCC Rules & Regulations, which allows unlicensed broadcasting at very low power. AM coverage (now off–air) was generally within about two miles of the City Park campus, while the FM signal covered about 50 feet of the Student Life Center.

Delgado Community College applied to the FCC for a Low Power FM (LPFM) license in October 2013 and was granted its license in December 2014.

In August 2026, Dolphin Radio ceased operations. The LPFM license for 99.1 FM was transferred from Delgado Community College to Wolf Moon Entertainment, a non-profit division of Loyola University New Orleans. "Howl Radio," an online Internet streaming station, was then able to broadcast over the air. In September 2026, Howl Radio applied to the FCC for a change of call letters and was granted "WHLU-LP."
