= Nunez Community College =

Public college in Chalmette, Louisiana, US

Coordinates: 29°57′17″N 89°57′39″W

Elaine P. Nunez Community College
- Type: Public community college
- Established: 1992
- Academic affiliations: Space-grant
- Administrative staff: 594
- Location: Chalmette, Louisiana, U.S.
- Campus: Suburban
- Colors: Teal and gray
- Nickname: Pelicans
- Sporting affiliations: NJCAA
- Website: www.nunez.edu

Nunez Community College (NCC) is a public community college in Chalmette, Louisiana. Its full name is Elaine P. Nunez Community College; it was named for the deceased wife of former Louisiana State Senate President Samuel B. Nunez.

Its service area includes St. Bernard and Plaquemines parishes.

== History ==
The school was formed by the 1992 merger of Elaine P. Nunez Technical Institute and St. Bernard Parish Community College. As a result, it offers both academic and vocational classes. In 2005, Nunez Community College was heavily damaged by flooding due to Hurricane Katrina. However, it was able to resume classes on January 25, 2006.

In 2019, Nunez Community College was placed on a censure list issued by the American Association of University Professors.

== Athletics ==
The Nunez Pelicans are composed of one athletic team representing Nunez Community College in intercollegiate athletics. The school sponsors baseball, which competes in National Junior College Athletic Association Division 1, Region 23. The Pelicans sports teams are members of the Louisiana Community Colleges Athletic Conference.

The Pelicans baseball team plays at the Val Riess Recreation Complex and Noel Suarez Stadium.

== Nunez Community College Foundation ==
The Nunez Community College Foundation is a non-profit organization that enables donors and organizations to donate and contribute towards the growth and future development of the college.

== Gallery ==
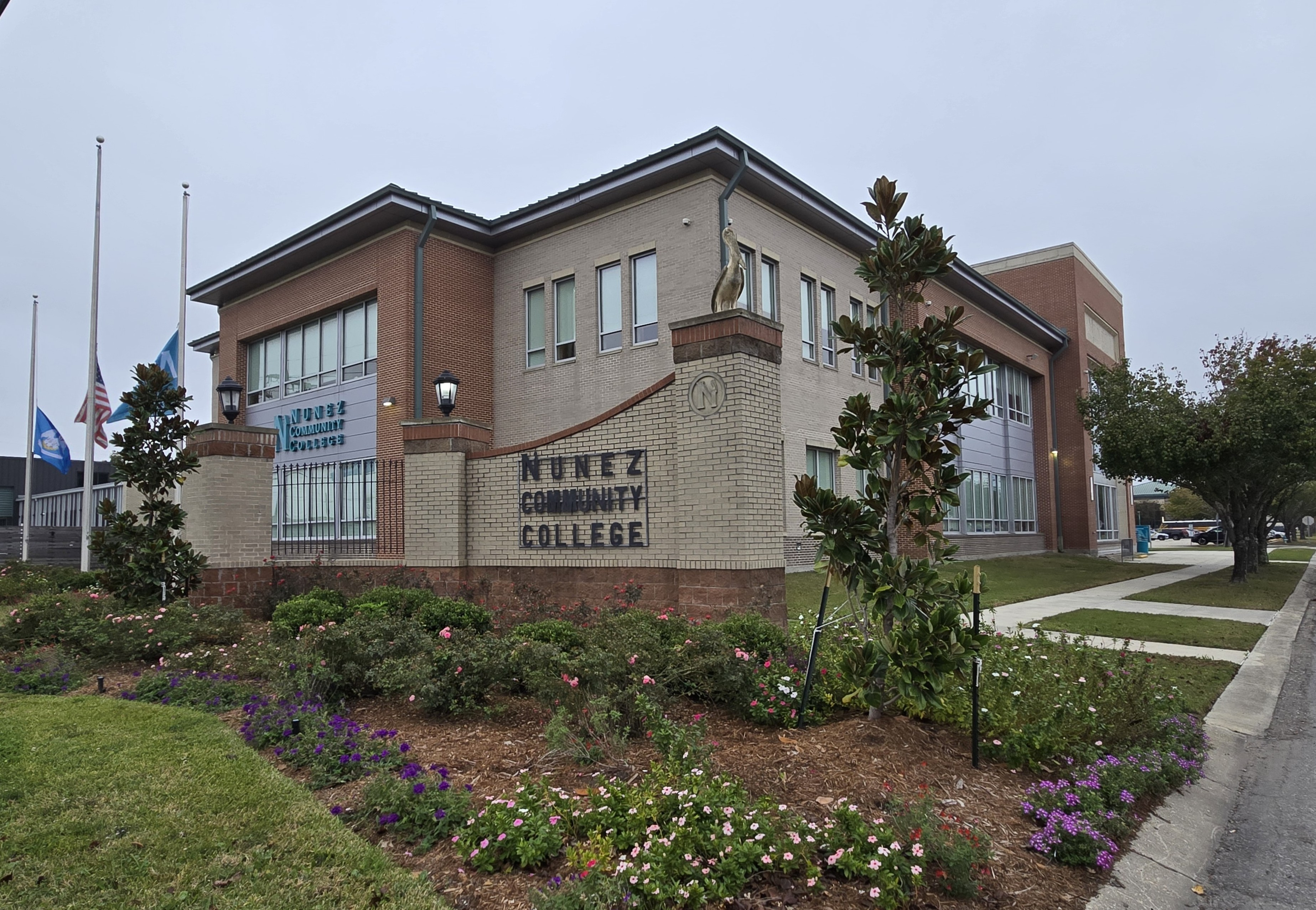
Administration Building

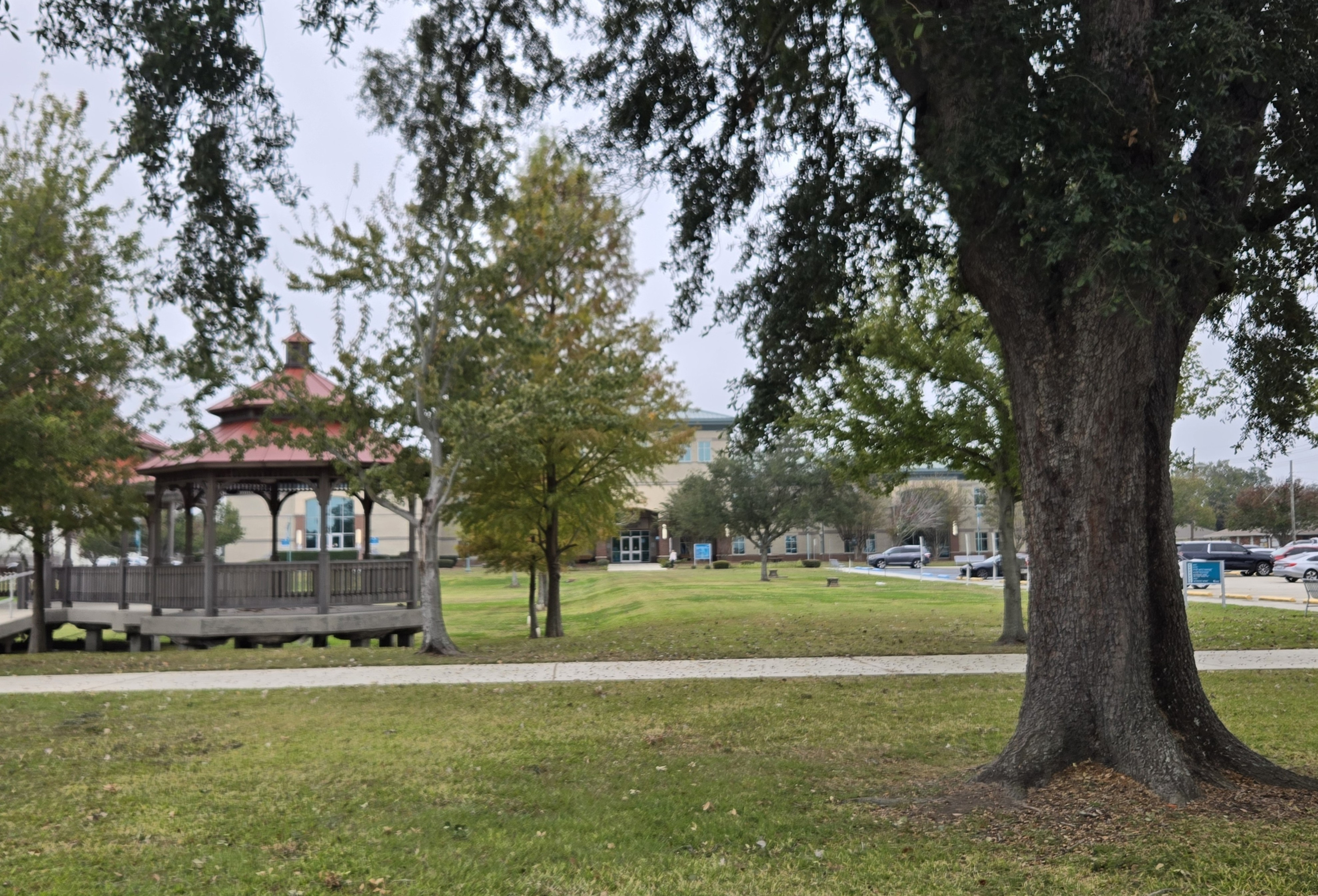
Arts, Science and Technology Building

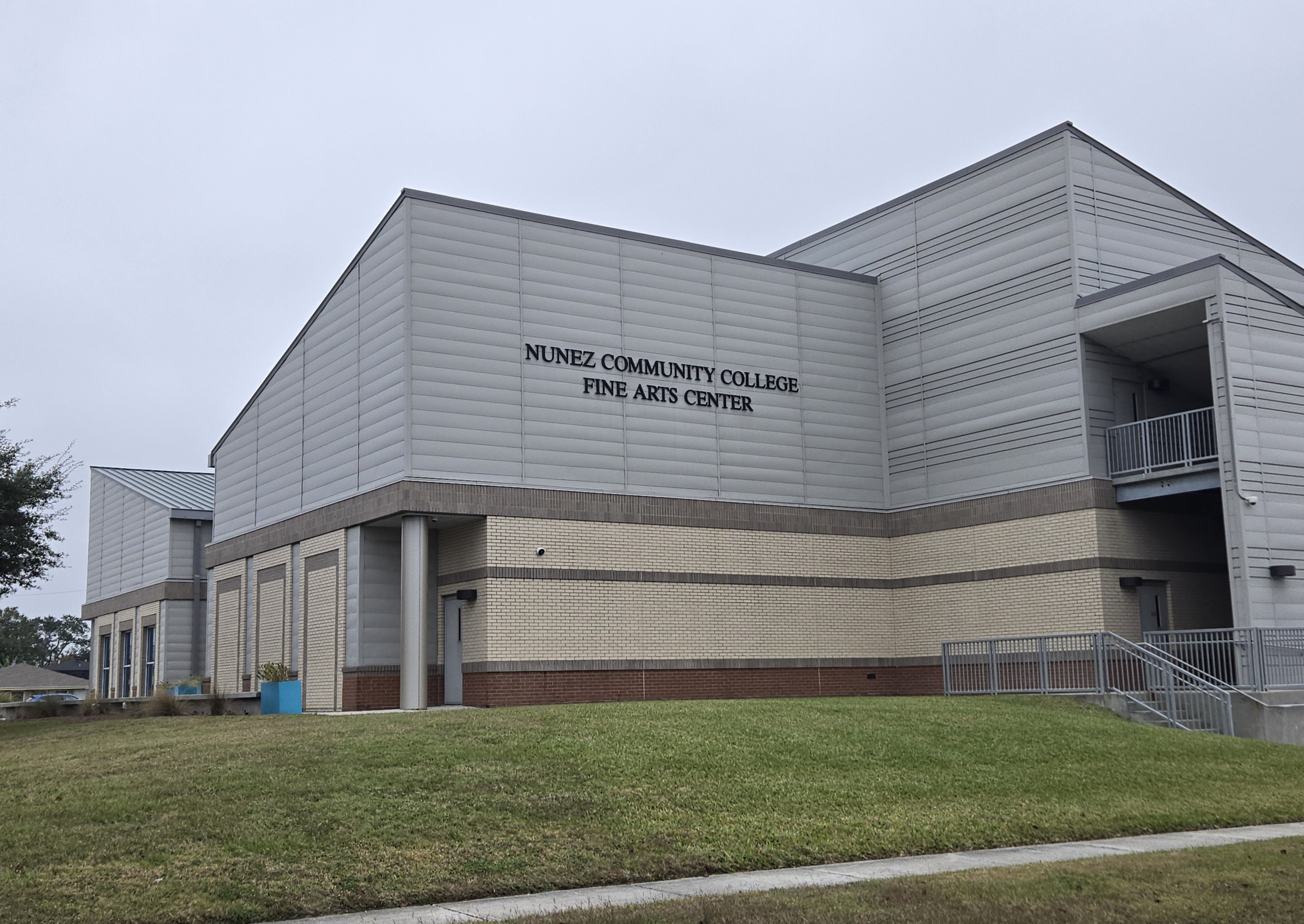
Fine Arts Building

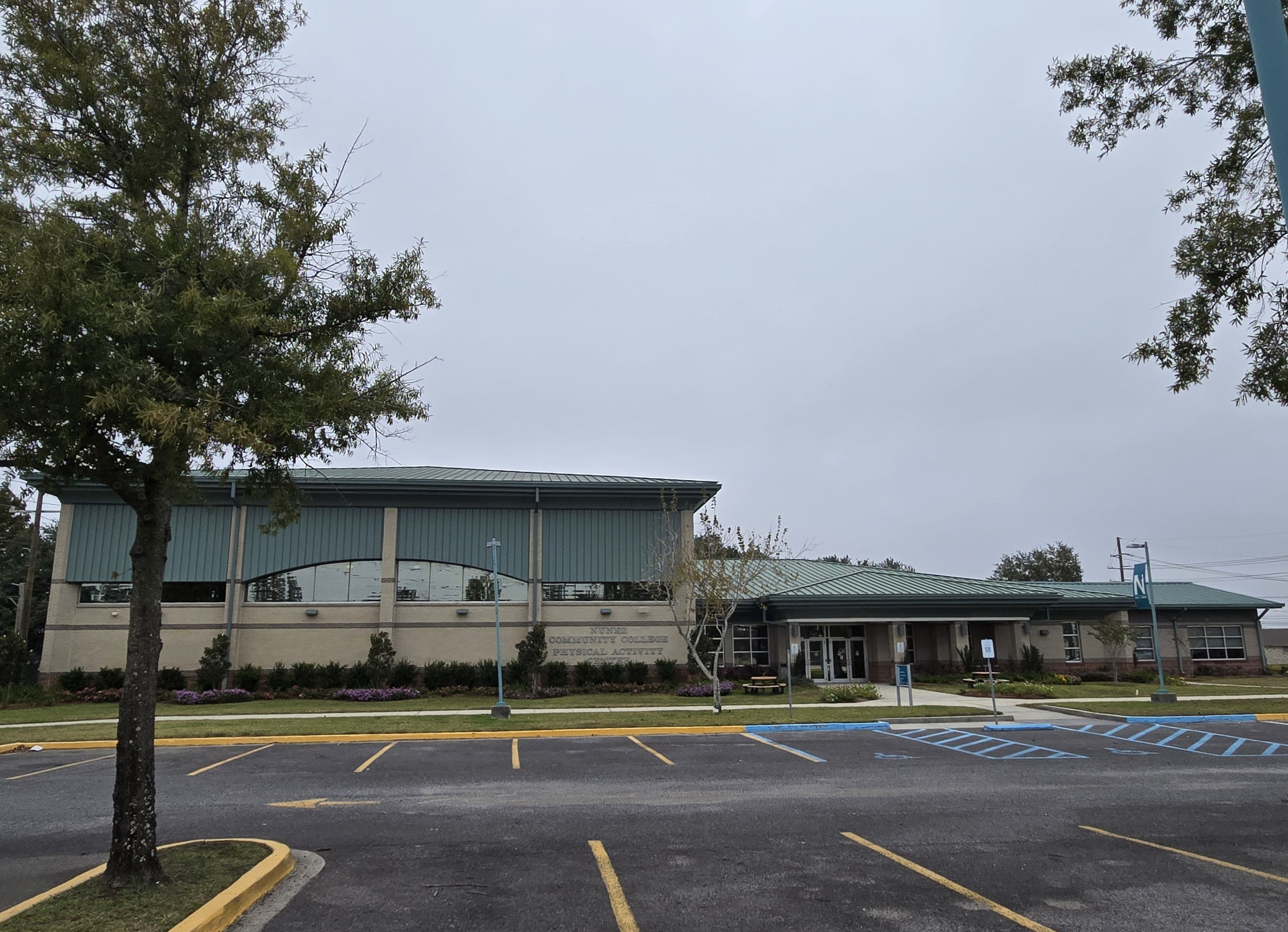
Physical Activity Center

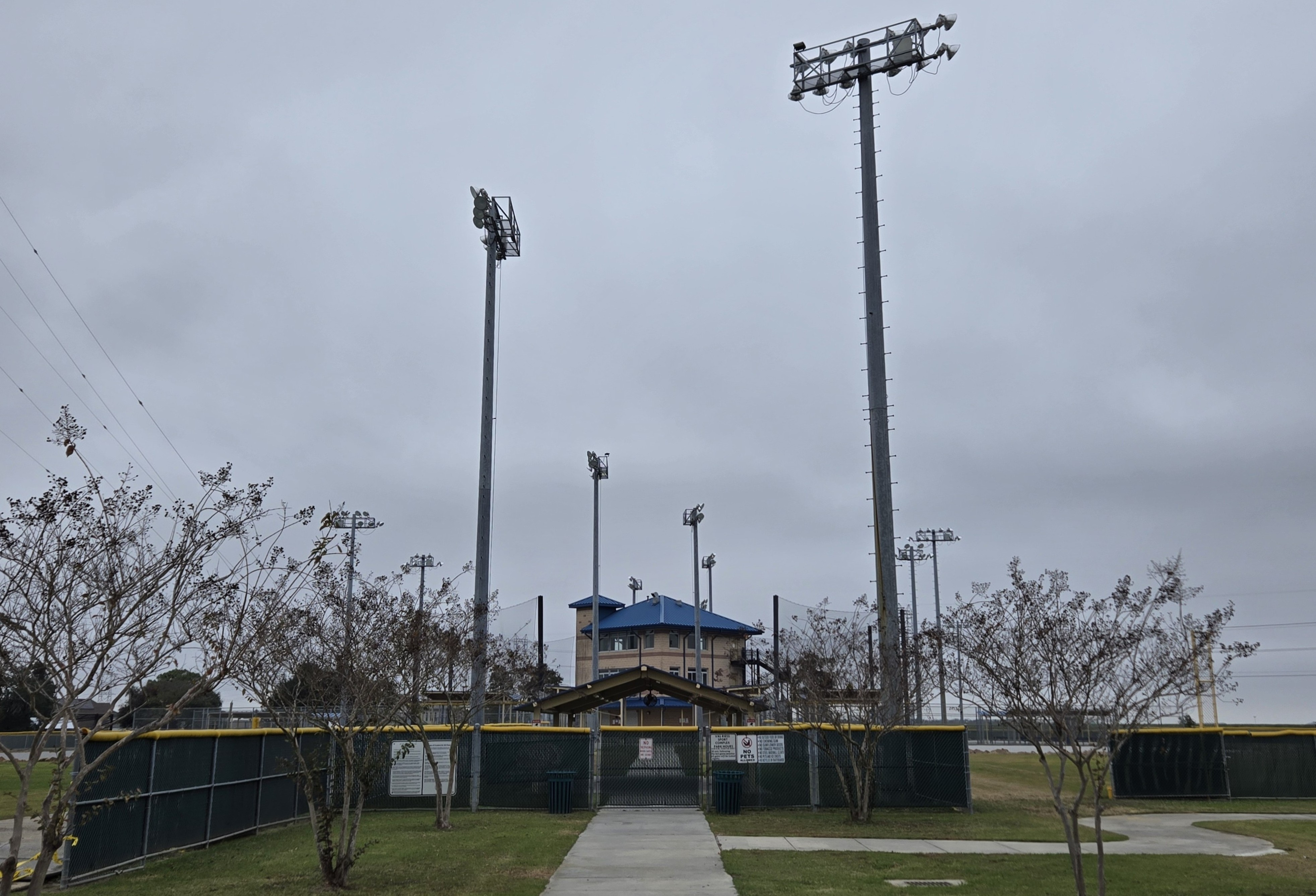
Noel Suarez Stadium at Val Riess Recreation Complex, Nunez Baseball
