= Old South Baton Rouge =

Old South Baton Rouge (OSBR) is a project aimed to help revitalize the area between Louisiana State University and Downtown Baton Rouge. The area encompasses about three square miles. The project/initiative was launched by the Baton Rouge Area Foundation with a goal to form a long-term strategic plan and help the neighborhood eventually establish its own 501(c)3 non-profit status to continue the project. The project is currently being overseen by employees of the Baton Rouge Area Foundation and the Center for Planning Excellence, as well as, a Partnership Board that was elected by residents of the Old South Baton Rouge community. It is estimated that the poverty level in the area is around 50% which is considered by the United States as a High Poverty Area. One of the main obstacles is to overturn the "culture of poverty" to which the area has become accustomed in the past several decades.

== History ==
The OSBR area was once a prominent part of the Baton Rouge Community that was racially integrated. It was the home of many of the best restaurants in the Baton Rouge area. During the Civil Rights Movement in the 1950s and 1960s many of the middle class residents fled the area for better housing as better jobs were made available to all races. After many of the wealthier residents left, many of the businesses that stayed were forced to eventually close due to bankruptcy, and many businesses that are currently in the area face similar issues. As the businesses closed their doors, many of the buildings were left abandoned and a "culture of poverty" began to take over the entire area. Realizing the importance of the area to Baton Rouge, many people have begun trying to change this culture and improve the overall looks and quality of life in the area.

== Old South Baton Rouge Neighborhood Partnership Board ==
The main function of the board is to help promote the revitalization of the area, and to help make the OSBR Strategic Plan a reality.

=== Board Makeup ===
The board currently has a total of 17 members, 15 of which are elected. Of the 17 members, 15 members are Old South Baton Rouge residents, along with other community leaders who have shown interest in the project. The other two members include one employee from the Baton Rouge Area Foundation and one employee from the Center for Planning Excellence.

=== Board Meetings ===
The board typically holds meetings at the McKinley Alumni Center on the third Monday of every month. In addition to monthly board meetings, the OSBR Board will host other meetings if the agenda of the meeting discusses relevant issues pertaining to the Old South Baton Rouge Area and its residents.

== OSBR Strategic Plan ==
The plan was created with the hopes that the recommendations put forward will be adopted and put into place in an effort to improve the area's looks and quality of life. The document was created with the help of Old South Baton Rouge residents, and is viewed as a comprehensive vision for the area. Some of the main goals of the plan include upgrades to street lights, sidewalks, and efforts to help reduce crime in the area.

== Louisiana State University Involvement ==
Louisiana State University is the southern border of the OSBR area and has a great interest in revitalizing the area. One of the main routes onto the LSU campus goes directly through this area. One of the efforts that LSU has put forward is offering a Design class to architecture students. Students are placed in groups and assigned to a business in the area. The goal of the class is for the students to help design and construct a project that will help the revitalization efforts in the area.

== Involvement ==
- Financial
- Volunteering Time
- Word of Mouth
