= Delgado Community College =

Community college in Louisiana, U.S.

Coordinates: 29.986609°N 90.103988°W

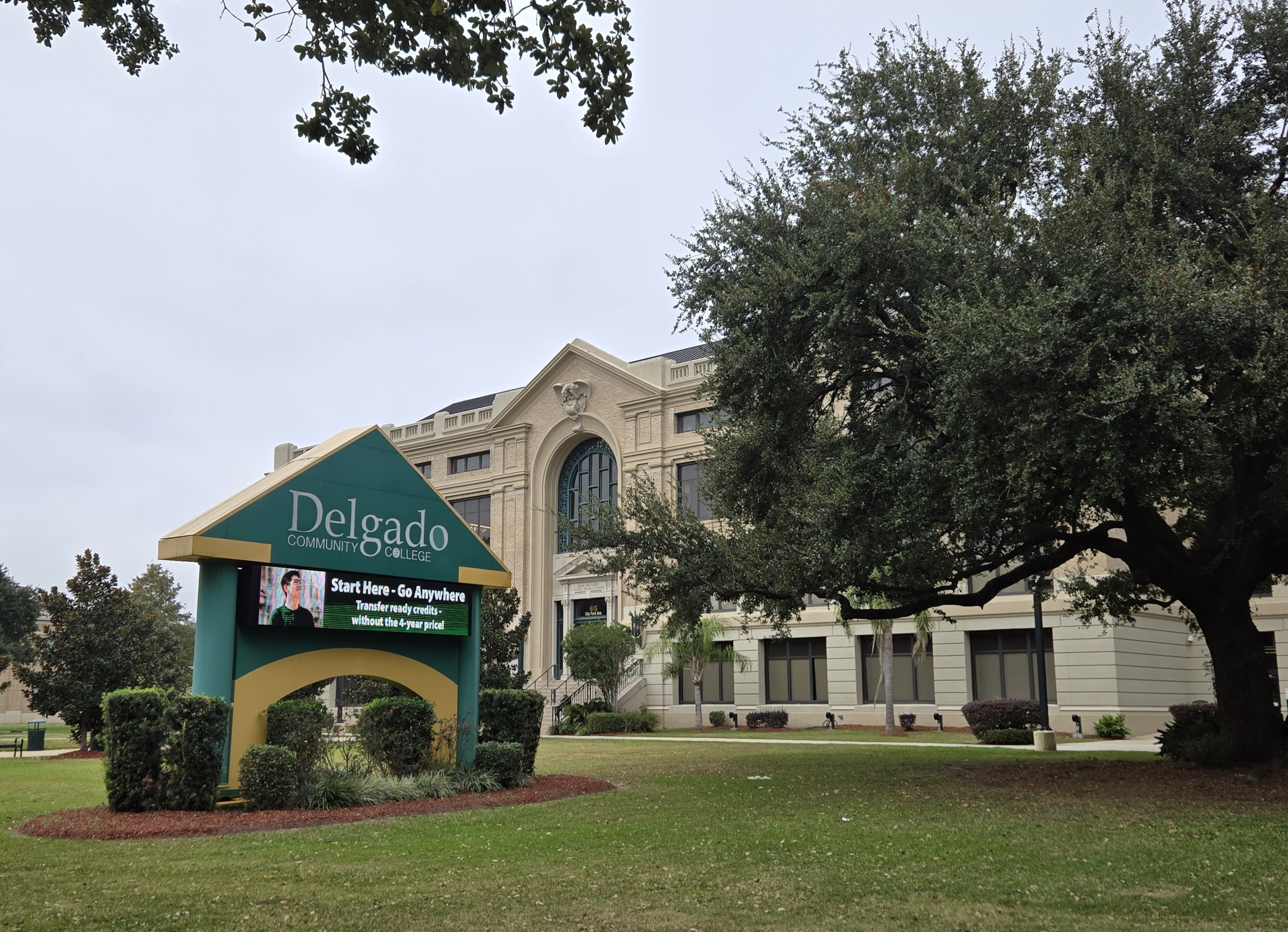
- Type: Public community college
- Established: 1921
- Parent institution: Louisiana Community and Technical College System
- Academic affiliations: Space-grant
- Students: 19,000
- Location: New Orleans, Louisiana, U.S.
- Campus: Urban
- Colors: Green & gold
- Nickname: Dolphins
- Sporting affiliations: NJCAA - LCCAC
- Website: www.dcc.edu

Delgado Community College (DCC) is a public community college in Louisiana, United States, with campuses throughout the New Orleans metropolitan area. Its current campuses are in New Orleans (Orleans Parish) and Jefferson Parish. The original City Park Campus is located in the Navarre neighborhood, adjacent to New Orleans City Park.

Delgado Community College is one of nine community colleges which operate under the auspices of the Louisiana Community and Technical College System. The institution originally opened in 1921 as Delgado Trades School; it went through several reorganizations and was finally named Delgado Community College by the Louisiana State Legislature in 1980, under the administration of Governor David C. Treen.

The maps of Louisiana's Technical and Community Colleges indicate that Delgado's service area includes New Orleans and Jefferson, St. Charles, St. John the Baptist, and St. Tammany parishes. A Delgado Community College document stated that, in addition, Lafourche, St. Bernard, and Terrebonne parishes are in its service area.

== Campuses ==
Sidney Collier Campus is in East New Orleans. While located within Orleans Parish, it is in close proximity to both St. Bernard Parish and St. Tammany Parish. WXDR-LP broadcasts from the main campus.

There were two campuses in St. Tammany Parish: one in Slidell, Louisiana, the Slidell Learning Center, and one in Covington, Louisiana, the Delgado Northshore campus that first opened in 1987. The Covington campus closed at the end of the spring 2014 semester. The Slidell campus closed in 2016 due to financial issues.

== Athletics ==
The Delgado Dolphins are composed of three athletic teams representing Delgado Community College in intercollegiate athletics, including baseball and men's and women's basketball. The Dolphins compete in National Junior College Athletic Association Division 1, Region 23. The Dolphins sports teams are members of the Louisiana Community Colleges Athletic Conference.

The Dolphins baseball team plays at "Rags" Scheuermann Field at Kirsch-Rooney Stadium, and the basketball teams play at the Michael Williamson Center.

== Notable alumni ==
- Billy Kennedy, assistant basketball coach for Wichita State
- Irma Thomas, Grammy Award-winning artist
- Scott Anthony Arceneaux Jr., Producer from Trap duo "$uicideboy$"

== Notable faculty and staff ==
- Cameron Henry, member of the Louisiana House of Representatives from District 82; former adjunct business professor at Delgado

== Gallery ==
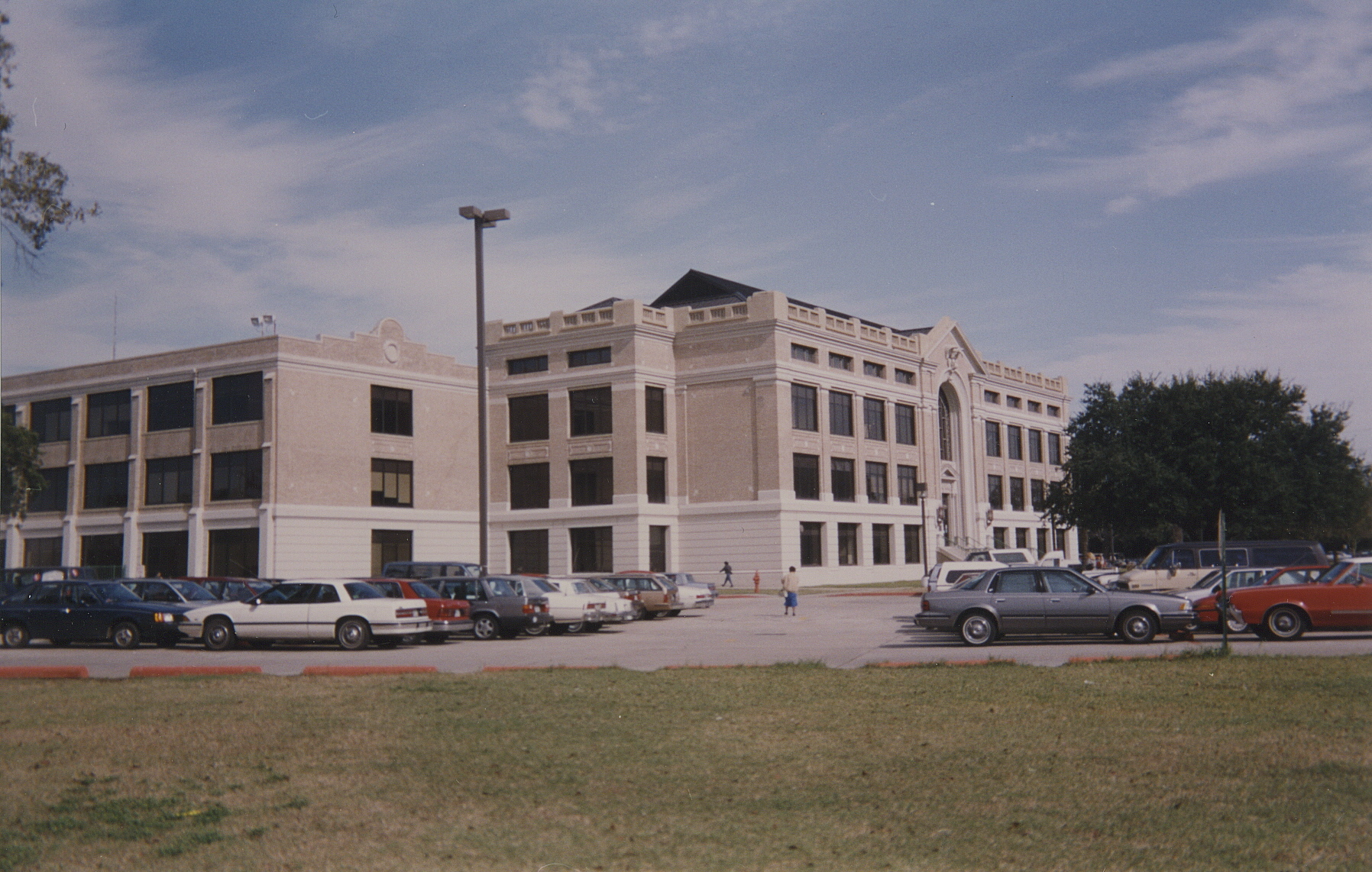
Isaac Delgado Hall, Delgado, City Park Campus

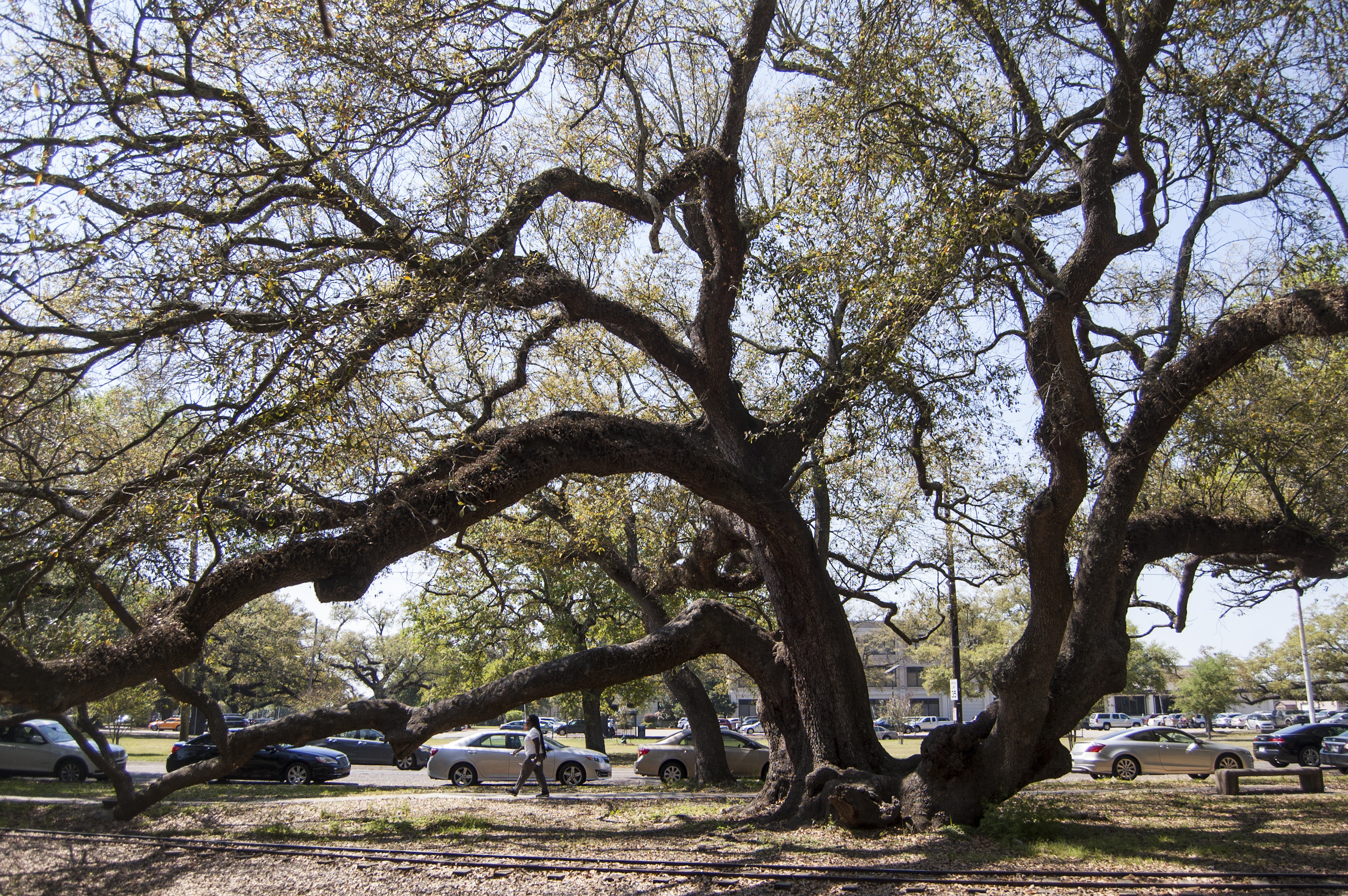
Delgado Community College, view from City Park

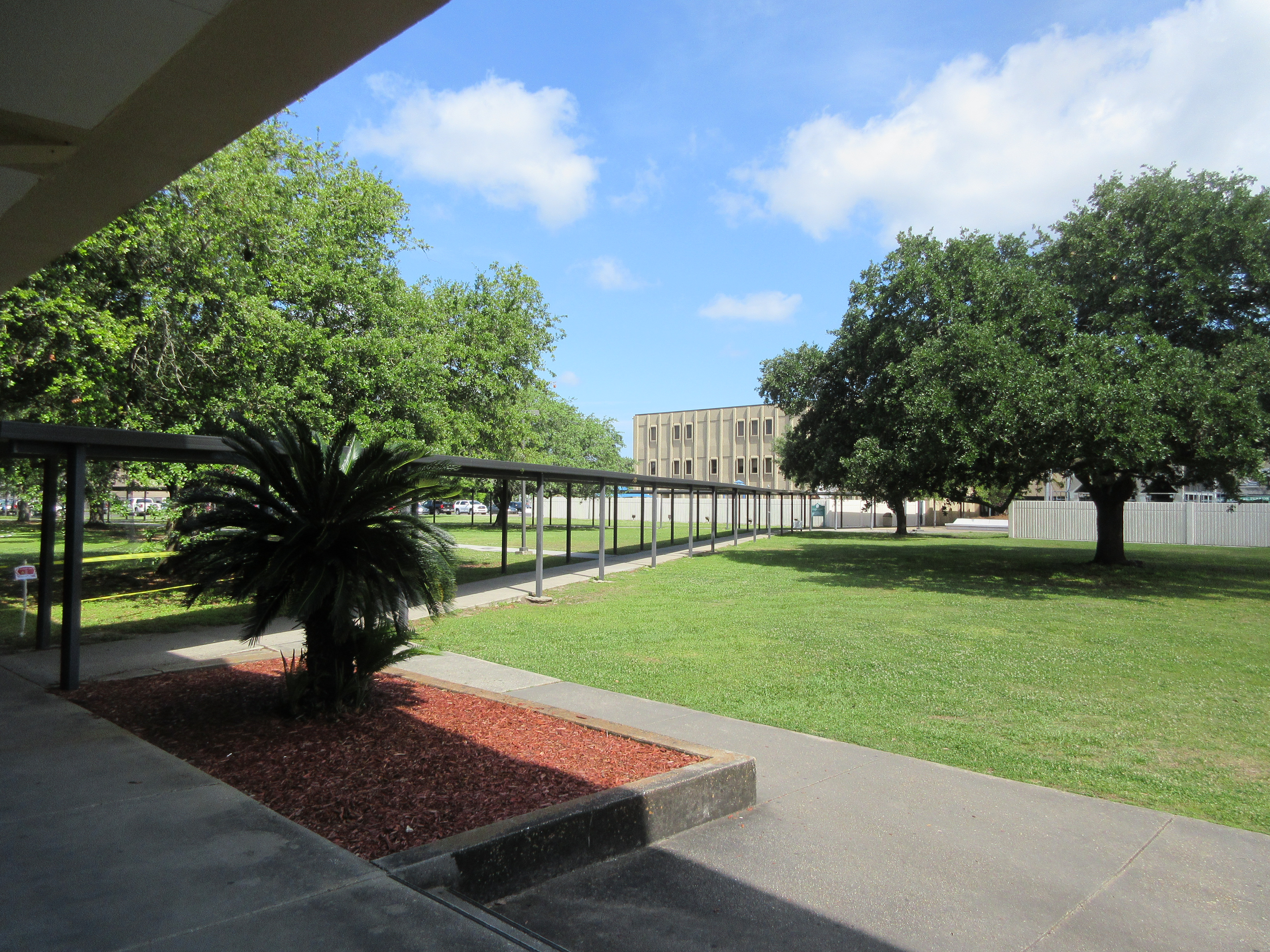
Delgado, City Park Campus

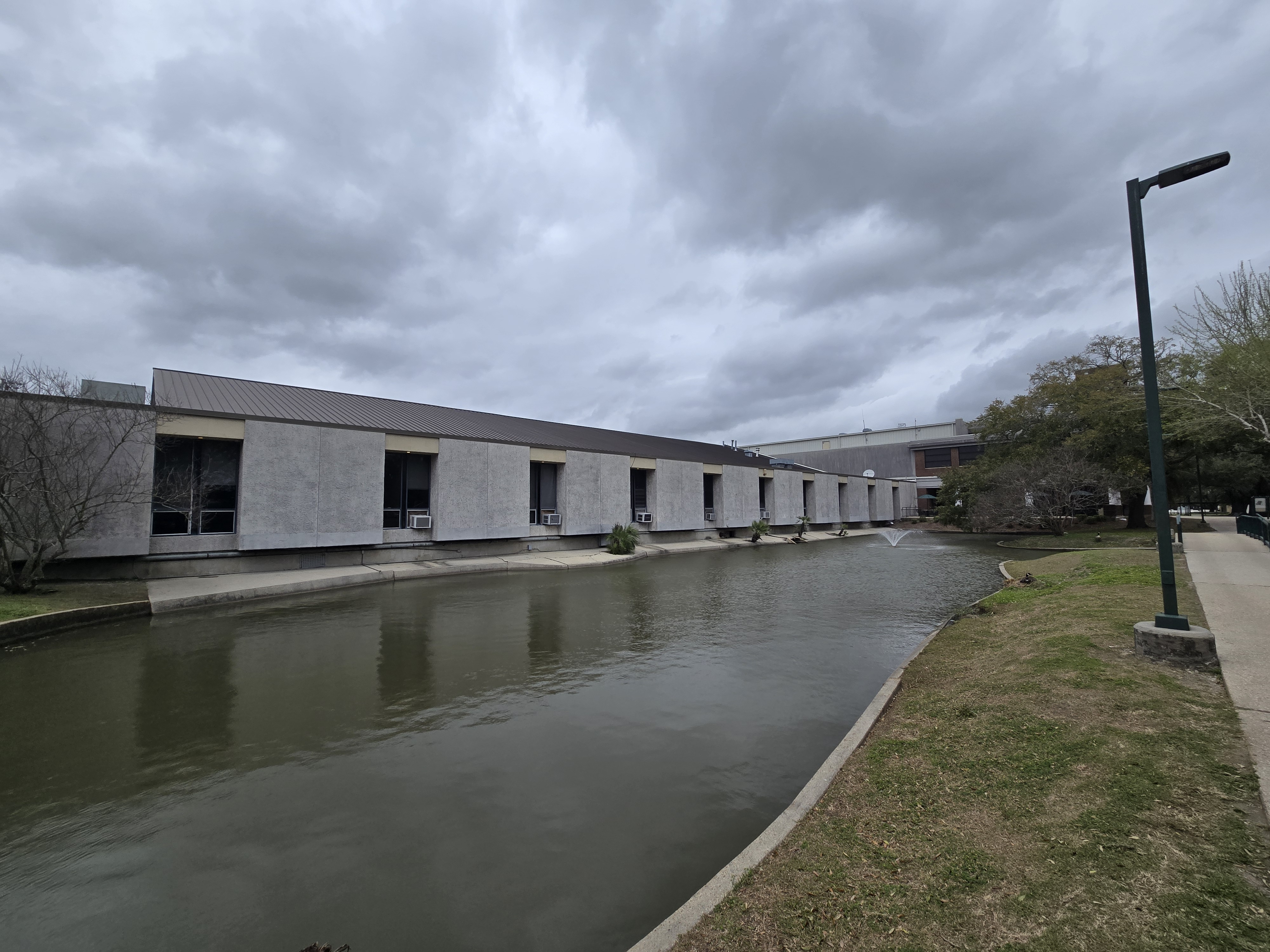
Michael Williamson Center, Delgado Basketball

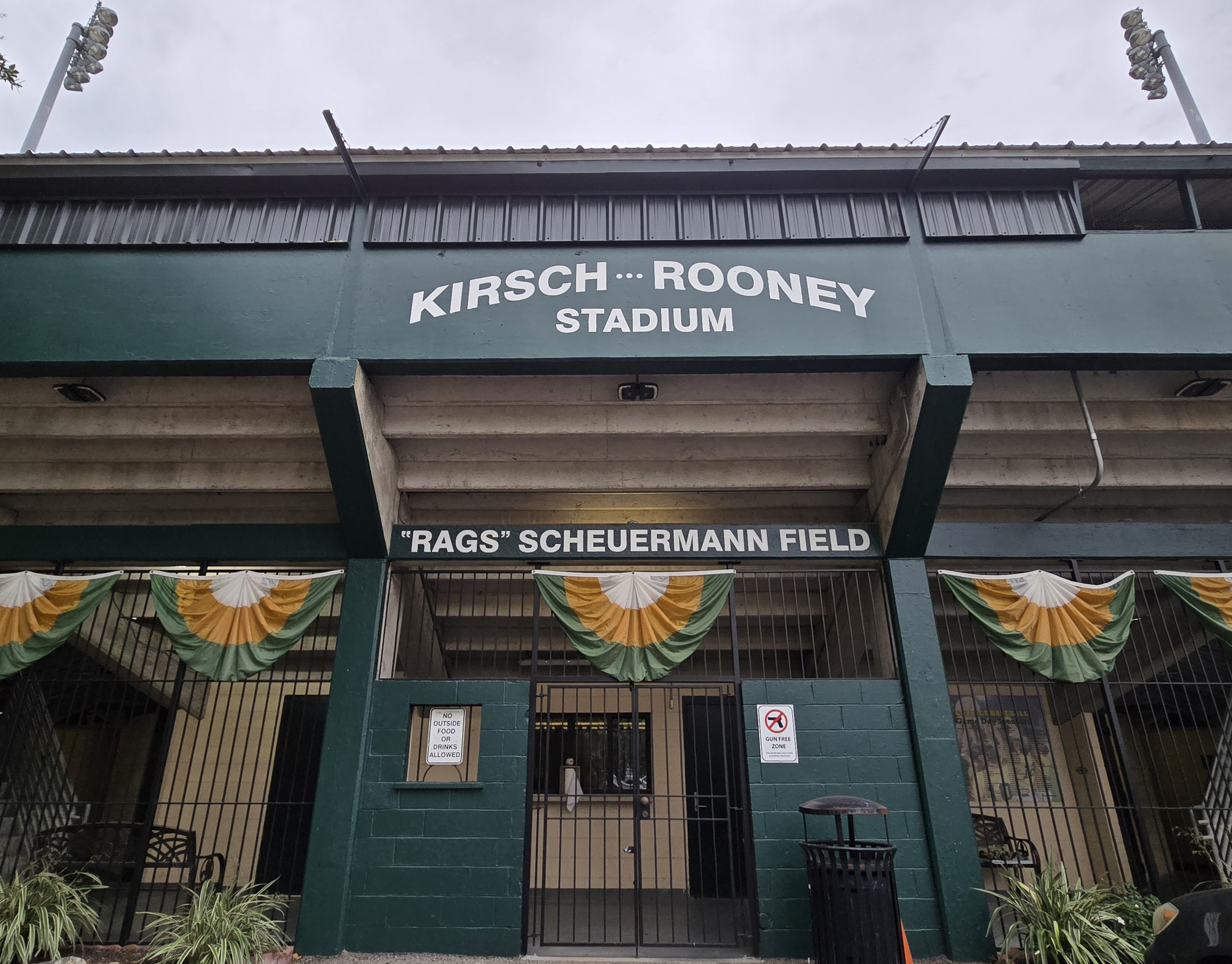
"Rags" Scheuermann Field at Kirsch-Rooney Stadium, Delgado Baseball

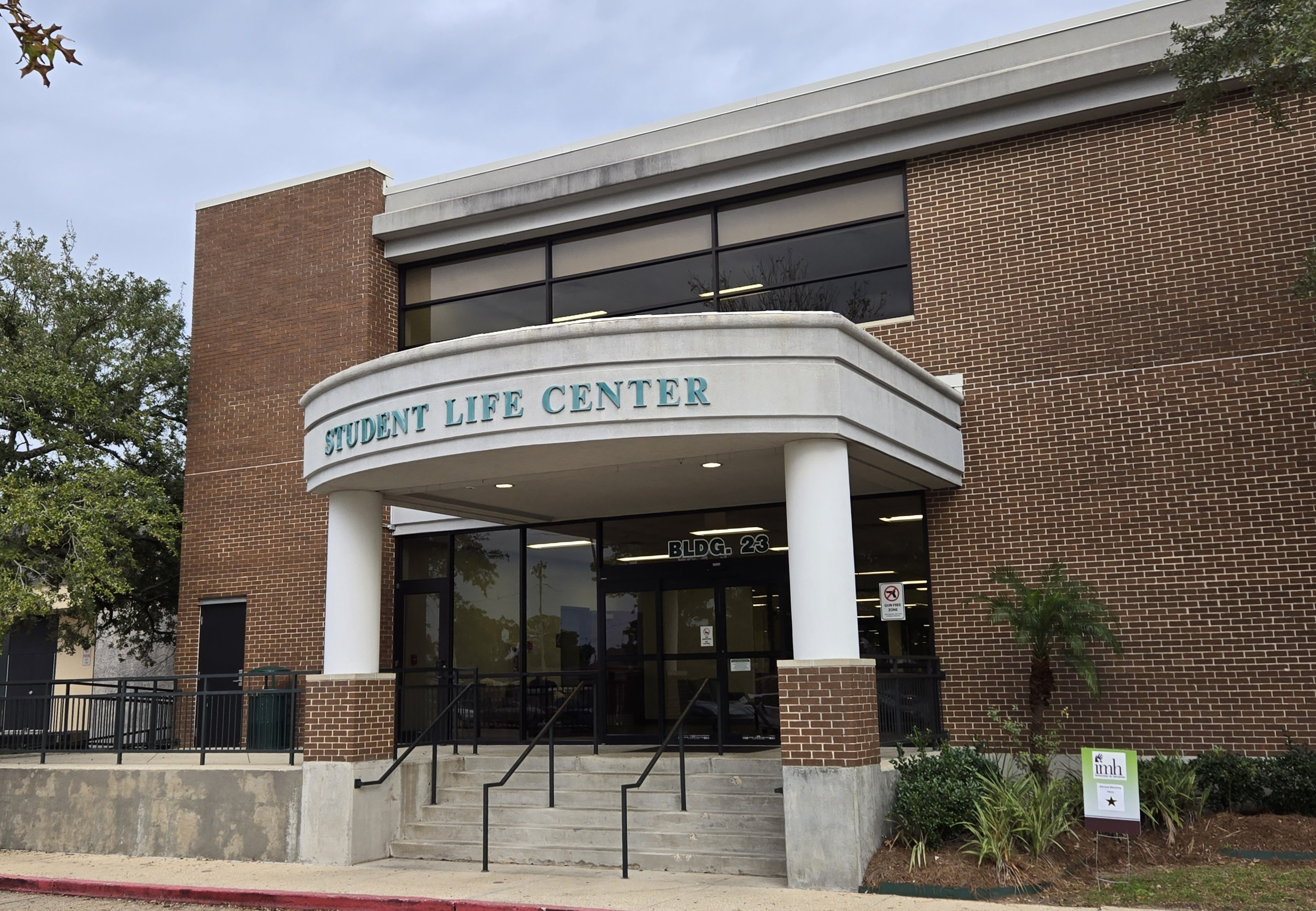
Delgado, City Park Campus, Student Life Center

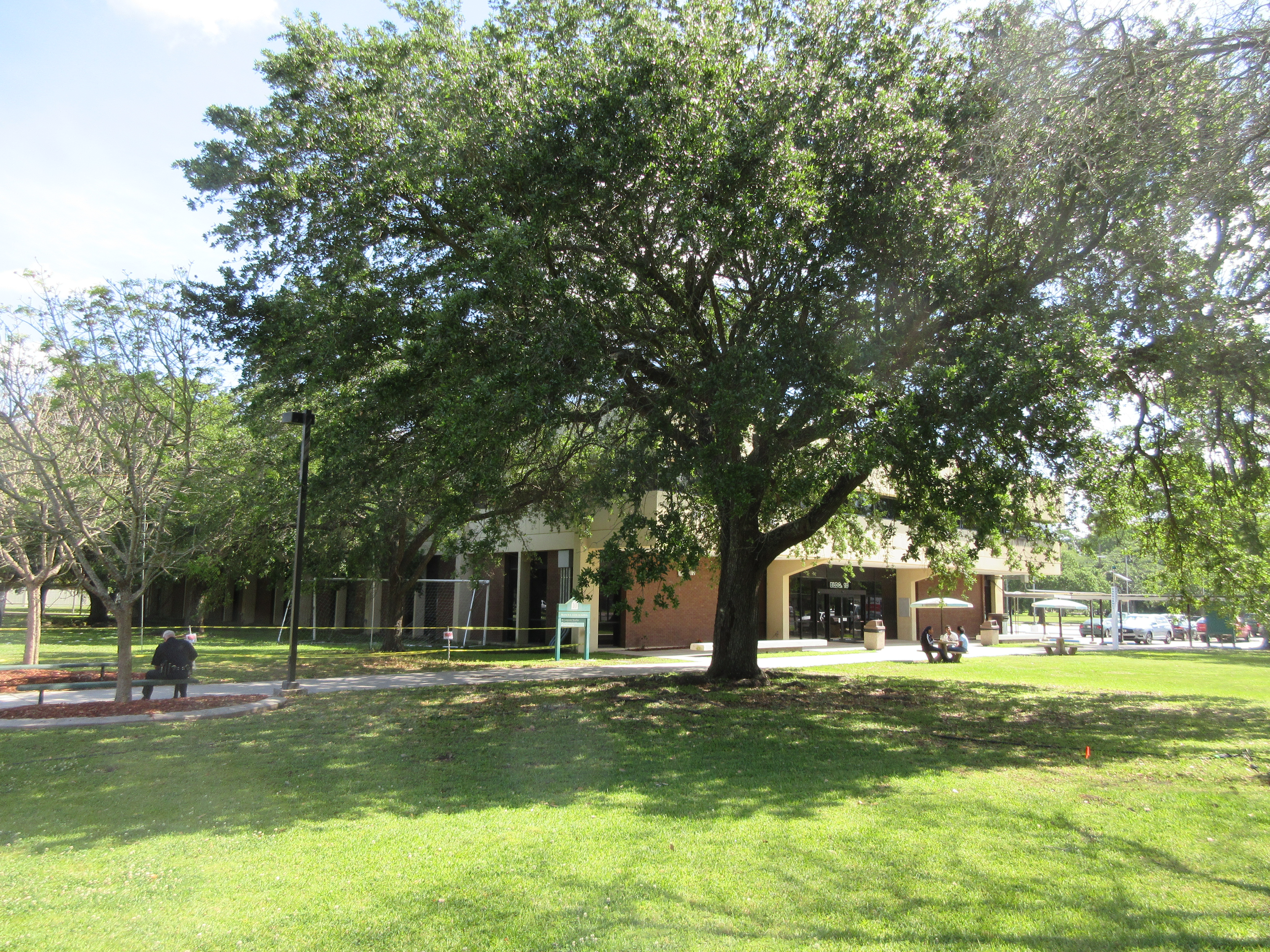
Delgado, City Park Campus building

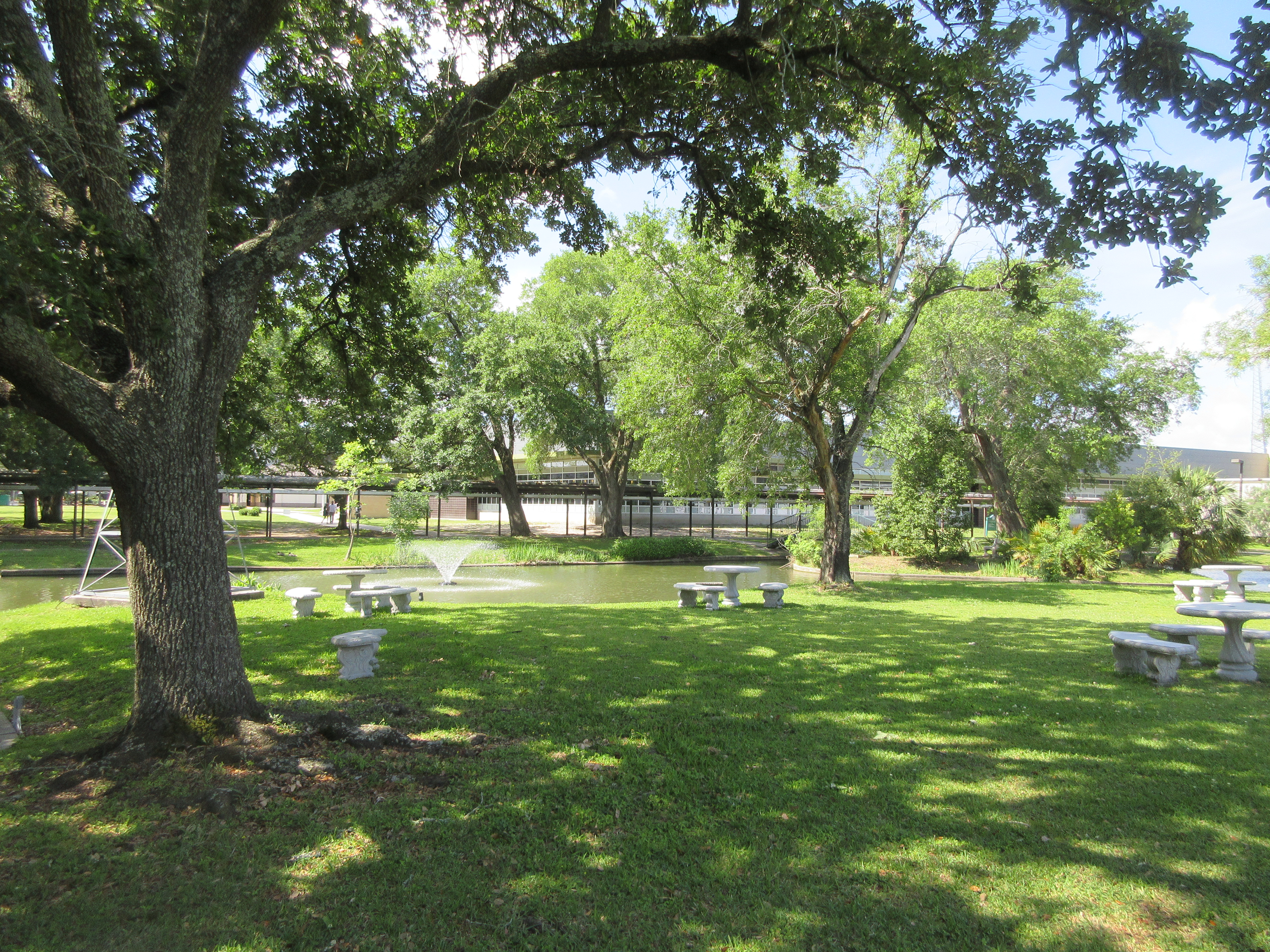
City Park Campus fountain

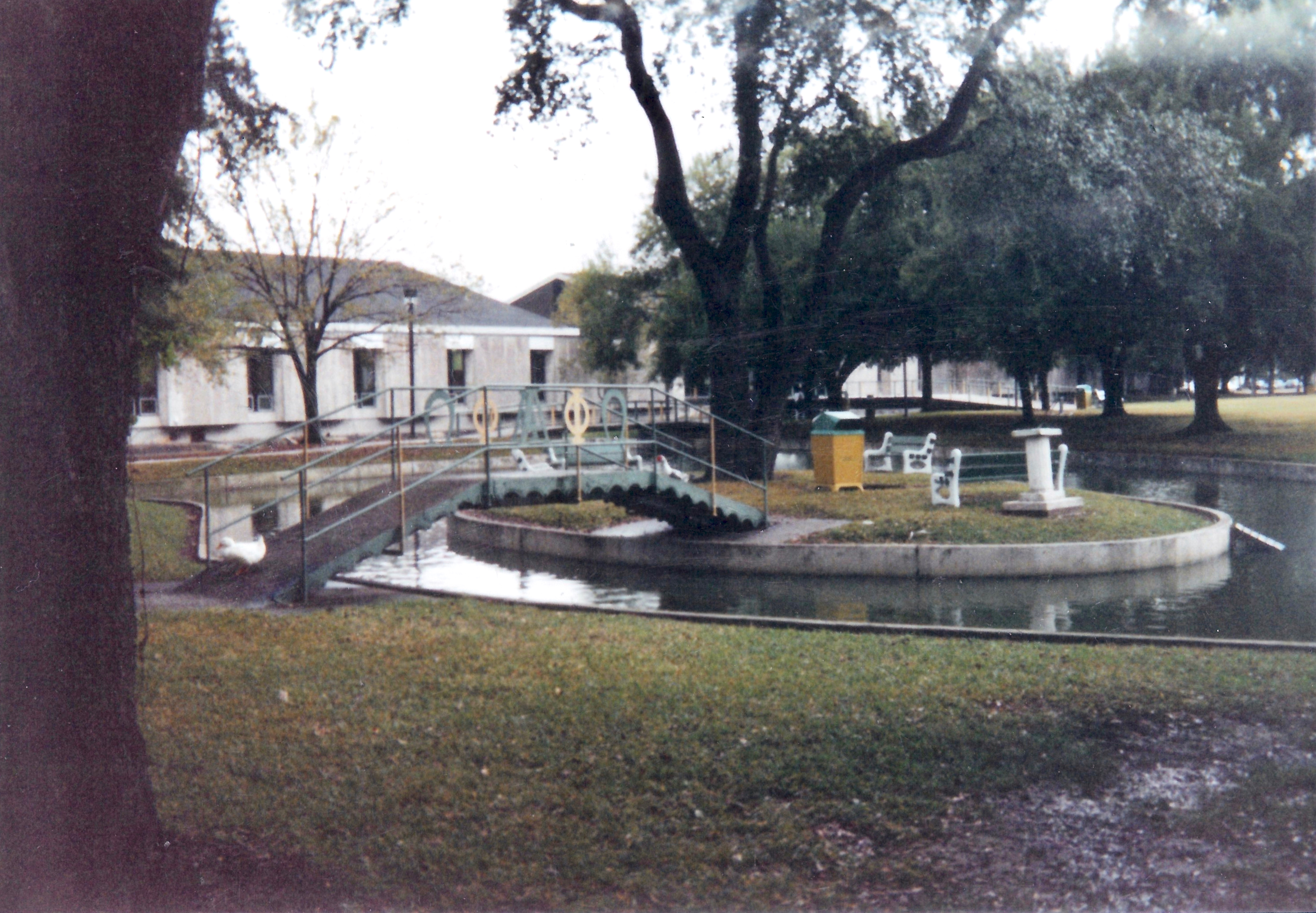
Delgado, City Park Campus water feature and island
