= Louisiana Community Colleges Athletic Conference =

Junior college athletic conference

Louisiana Community Colleges Athletic Conference (LCCAC)
- Association: NJCAA
- Founded: 1971
- Sports fielded: 18 (10 men's, 8 women's)
- No. of teams: 5
- Headquarters: New Orleans, Louisiana
- Region: Louisiana – Region 23

The Louisiana Community Colleges Athletic Conference (LCCAC) is a member conference of the National Junior College Athletic Association (NJCAA). It, along with the Mississippi Association of Community Colleges Conference (MACCC), are members of NJCAA Region 23. The conference was known as the MISS-LOU Junior College Conference before its name change in early 2019. The members of the LCCAC do not have football programs, whereas the members of the MACJC. except Meridian Community College, do.

The LCCAC is a junior college conference for many technical and community colleges. Conference championships are held in most sports and individuals can be named to All-Conference and All-Academic teams. At one time, Meridian Community College in Meridian, Mississippi was a member of the LCCAC, however MCC left the conference in 2002 for the MACJC in order to cut travel expenses.

== Member schools ==
=== Current members ===
The LCCAC currently has five full members, all are public schools:

Institution	Location (Note: All locations are within the State of Louisiana.)	Founded	Affiliation	Enrollment	Nickname	Joined
Baton Rouge Community College	Baton Rouge	1995	Public (Note: Part of the Louisiana Community and Technical College System.)	8,000	Bears	?
Delgado Community College	New Orleans	1921	Public	19,000	Dolphins	?
Louisiana State University at Eunice	Eunice	1964	Public (Note: Part of the Louisiana State University System.)	4,074	Bengals	?
Nunez Community College	Chalmette	1992	Public	2,166	Pelicans	?
Southern University at Shreveport	Shreveport	1967	Public (Note: Part of the Southern University System.)	3,014	Jaguars	?

=== Former members ===
The LCCAC had one former full member, which was also a public school:

Institution	Location (Note: All locations are within the State of Louisiana.)	Founded	Affiliation	Enrollment	Nickname	Joined	Left	Current conference
Bossier Parish Community College	Bossier City	1966	Public (Note: Part of the Louisiana Community and Technical College System.)	5,727	Cavaliers	?	?	Southwest (SJCC) (NJCAA Region XIV)
