= Baton Rouge Community College =

Public college in Baton Rouge, Louisiana, US

Coordinates: 30°26′56″N 91°8′8″W

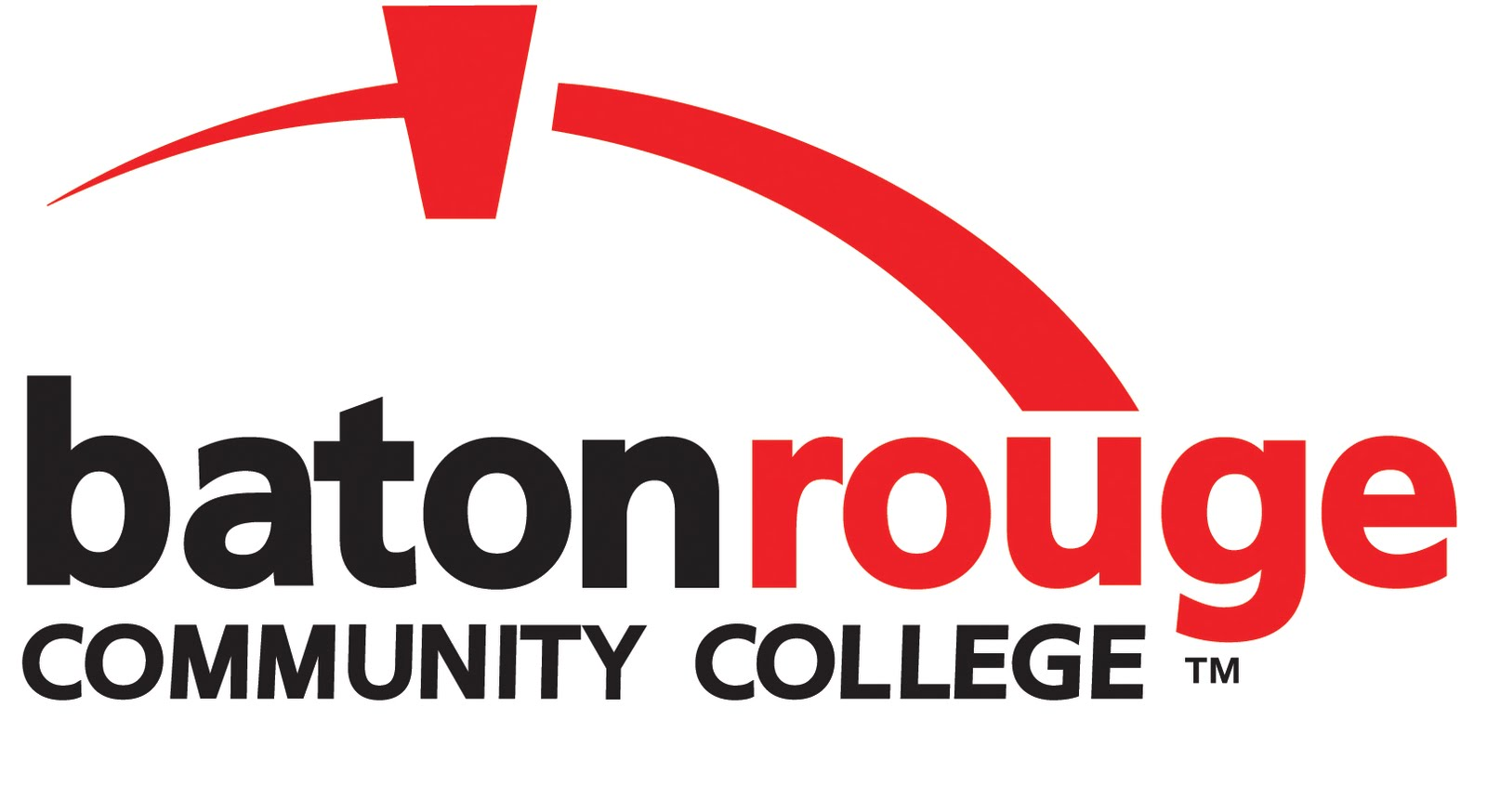
- Motto: Imagine What You Can Do
- Type: Public community college
- Established: June 28, 1995; 31 years ago
- Academic affiliations: Space-grant
- Chancellor: Willie E. Smith
- Students: 8,000
- Location: Baton Rouge, Louisiana, United States
- Campus: Urban
- Colors: Red, black, and white
- Nickname: Bears
- Sporting affiliations: NJCAA - Miss-Lou Conference
- Website: www.mybrcc.edu

Baton Rouge Community College is a public community college in Baton Rouge, Louisiana, United States. Established on June 28, 1995, the college settled into a permanent location in 1998. The 60-acre (240,000 m^{2}) campus consists of six main buildings: Governors Building, Louisiana Building, Cypress Building, Bienvenue Student Center, the Magnolia Library and Performing Arts Pavilion, and the Bonne Santé Wellness Center. The college's current enrollment is 8,000 students.

Its service area includes East Baton Rouge, East Feliciana, Livingston, St. Helena, West Baton Rouge, and West Feliciana parishes.

== Academics ==
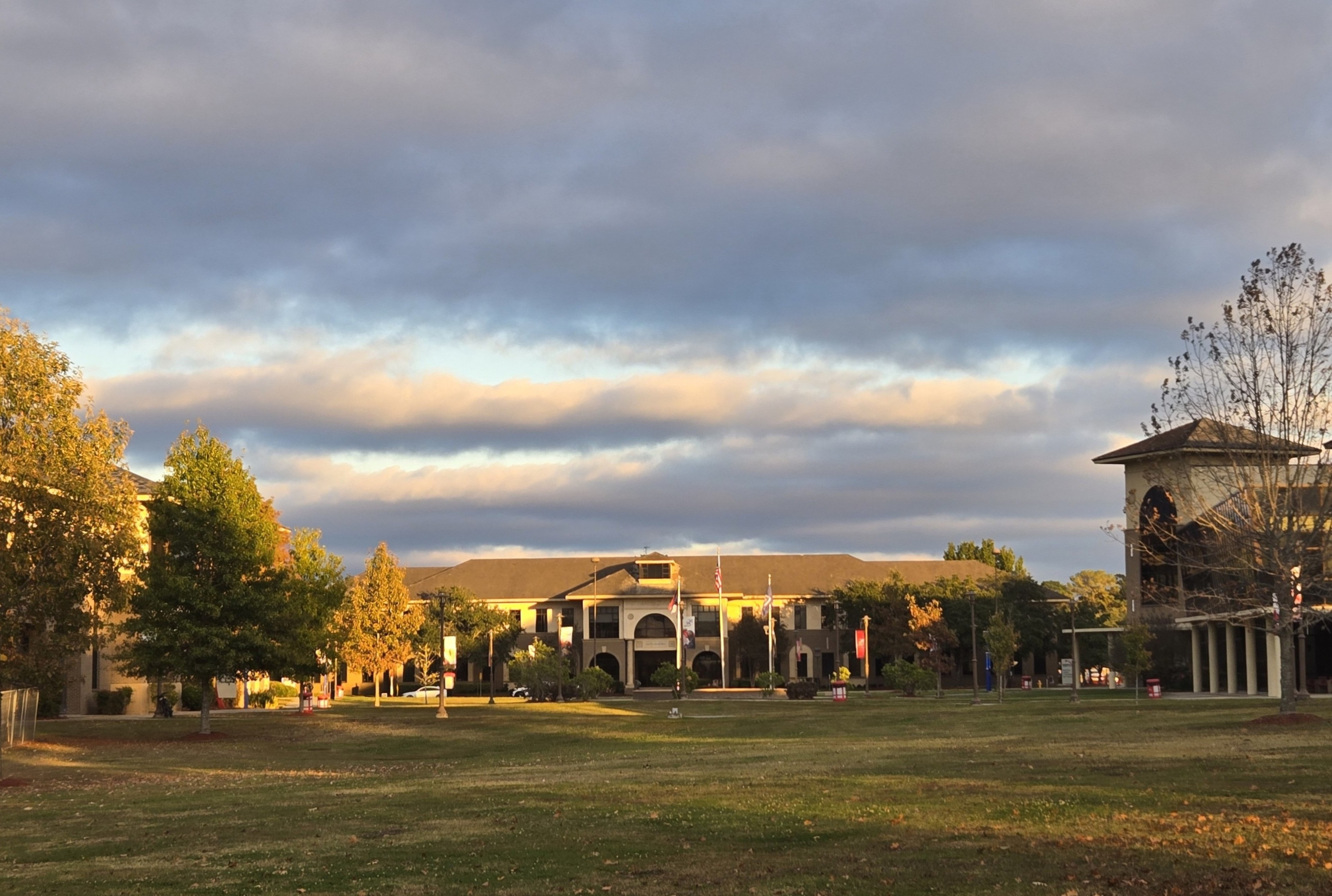
Louisiana Bldg, Governors Bldg, Magnolia Library and Performing Arts Pavilion in Quad

The Baton Rouge Community College offers collegiate and career education for: transfer to four-year colleges and universities, community education programs and services, lifelong learning, developmental education, distance learning, and workforce and continuing education programs. The curricular offerings include courses and programs leading to transfer credits, certificates, and associate degrees.

== Admissions ==
Baton Rouge Community College (BRCC) accepts graduates of a state-approved high school, individuals who have obtained the General Equivalency Diploma (GED), or individuals who are at least eighteen (18) years-of-age for admission. High school students at least 16 years-of-age can be admitted through concurrent enrollment, which allows them to register in a maximum of two college courses simultaneously with their high school courses.

== Athletics ==
The BRCC Bears are composed of three athletic teams representing Baton Rouge Community College in intercollegiate athletics, including baseball and men's and women's basketball. The Bears compete in National Junior College Athletic Association Division 1, Region 23. The Bears sports teams are members of the Louisiana Community Colleges Athletic Conference.

The Bears baseball team plays at Pete Goldsby Field, the basketball teams play at the Bonne Santé Wellness Center and the softball team plays at Hartley-Vey Sports Park at Oak Villa.

== Gallery ==
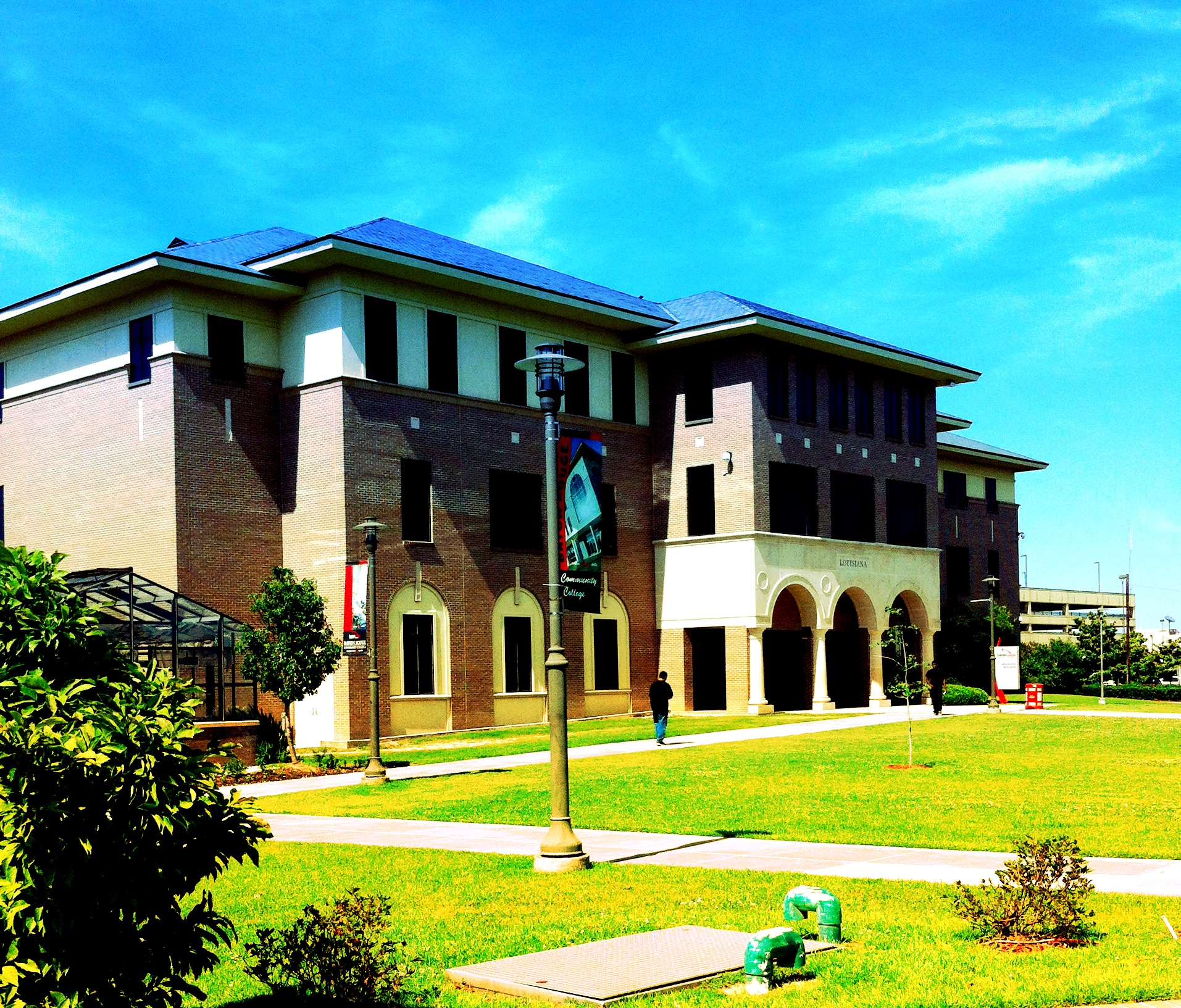
Louisiana Building

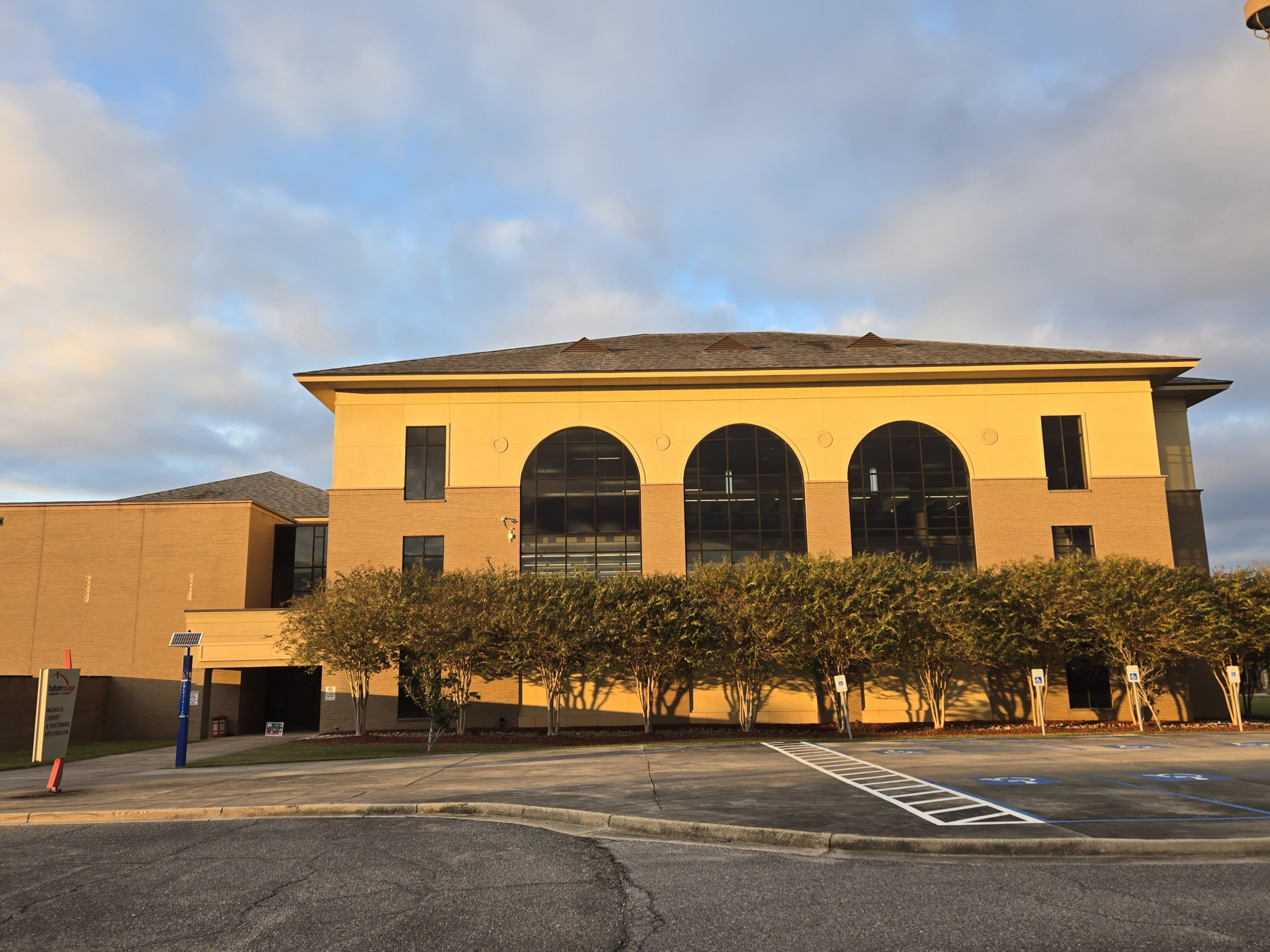
Magnolia Library and Performing Arts Pavilion

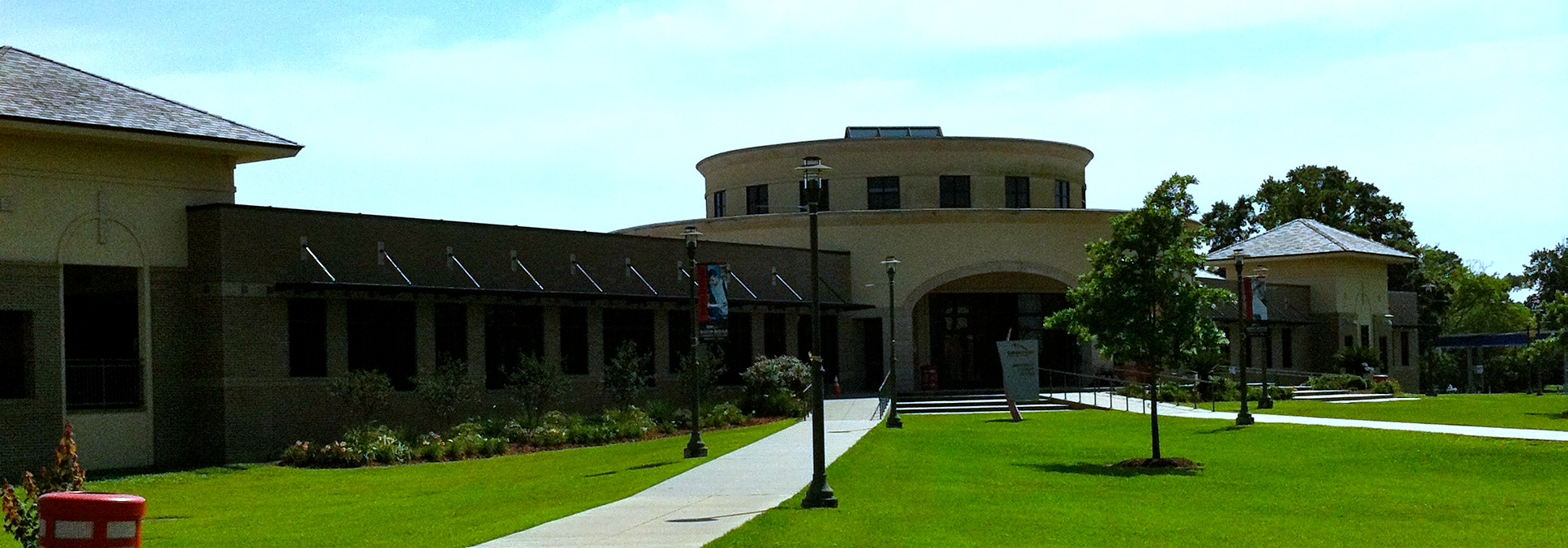
Bienvenue Student Center

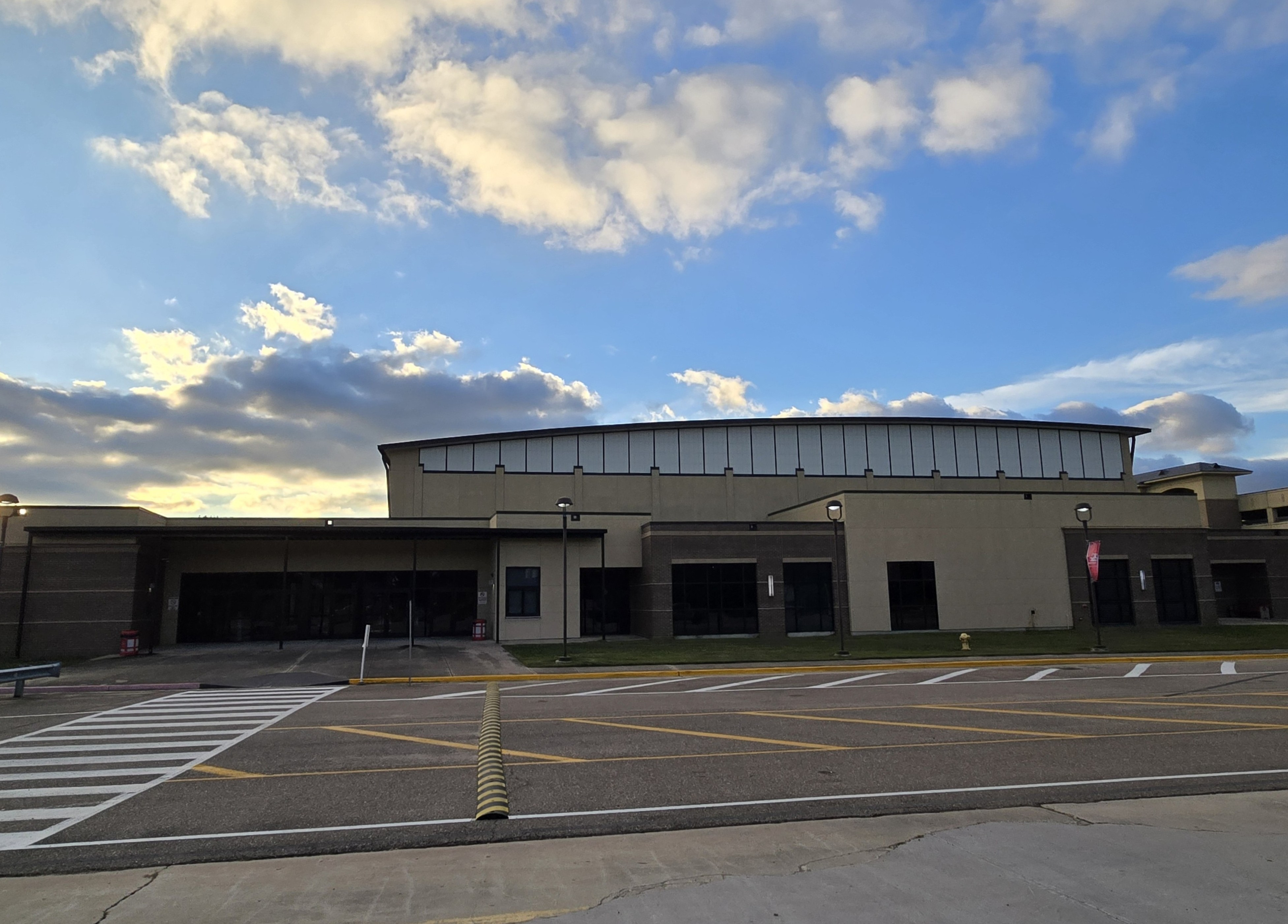
Bonne Sante Wellness Center exterior, BRCC Basketball

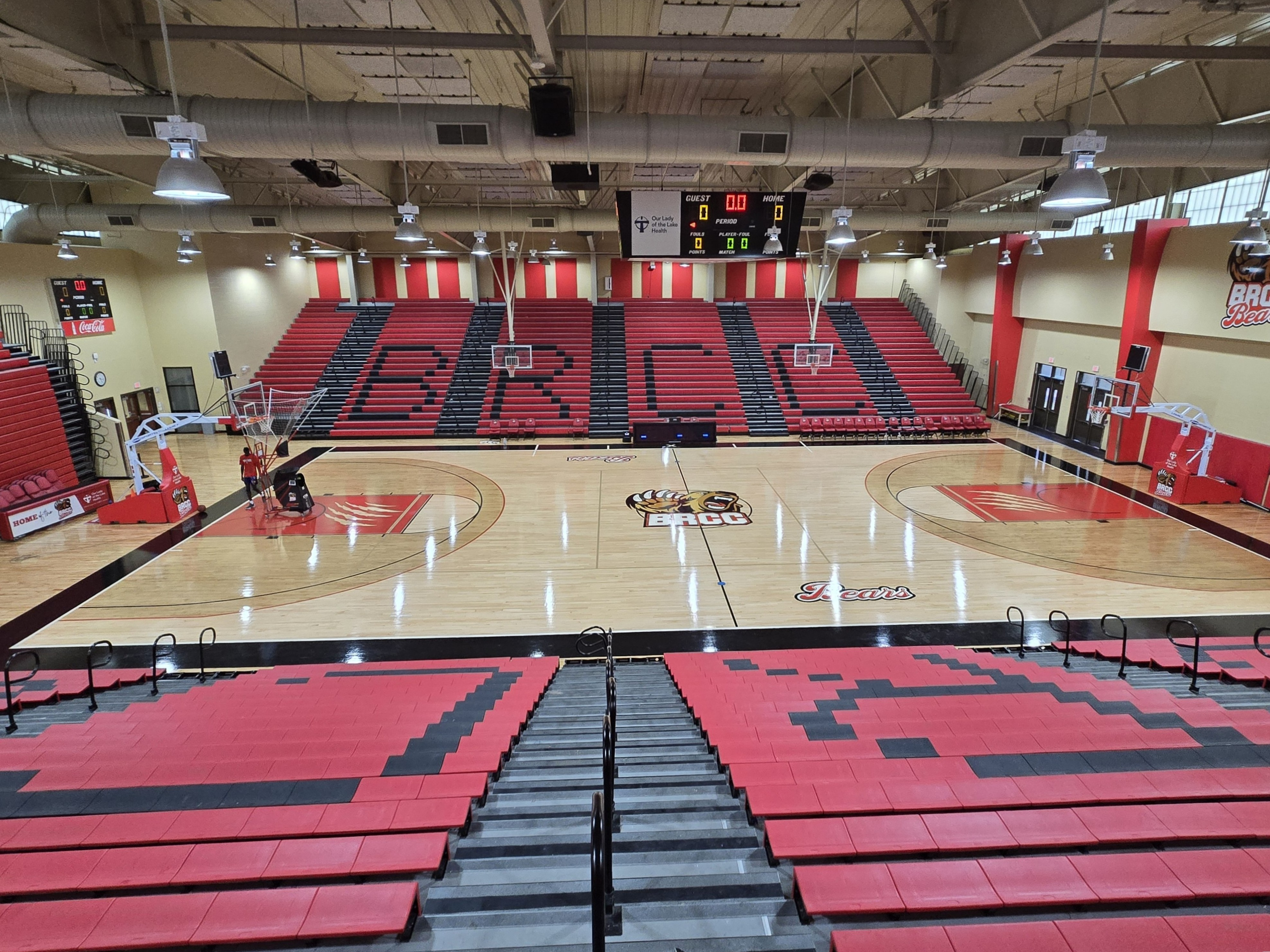
Bonne Sante Wellness Center interior, BRCC Basketball

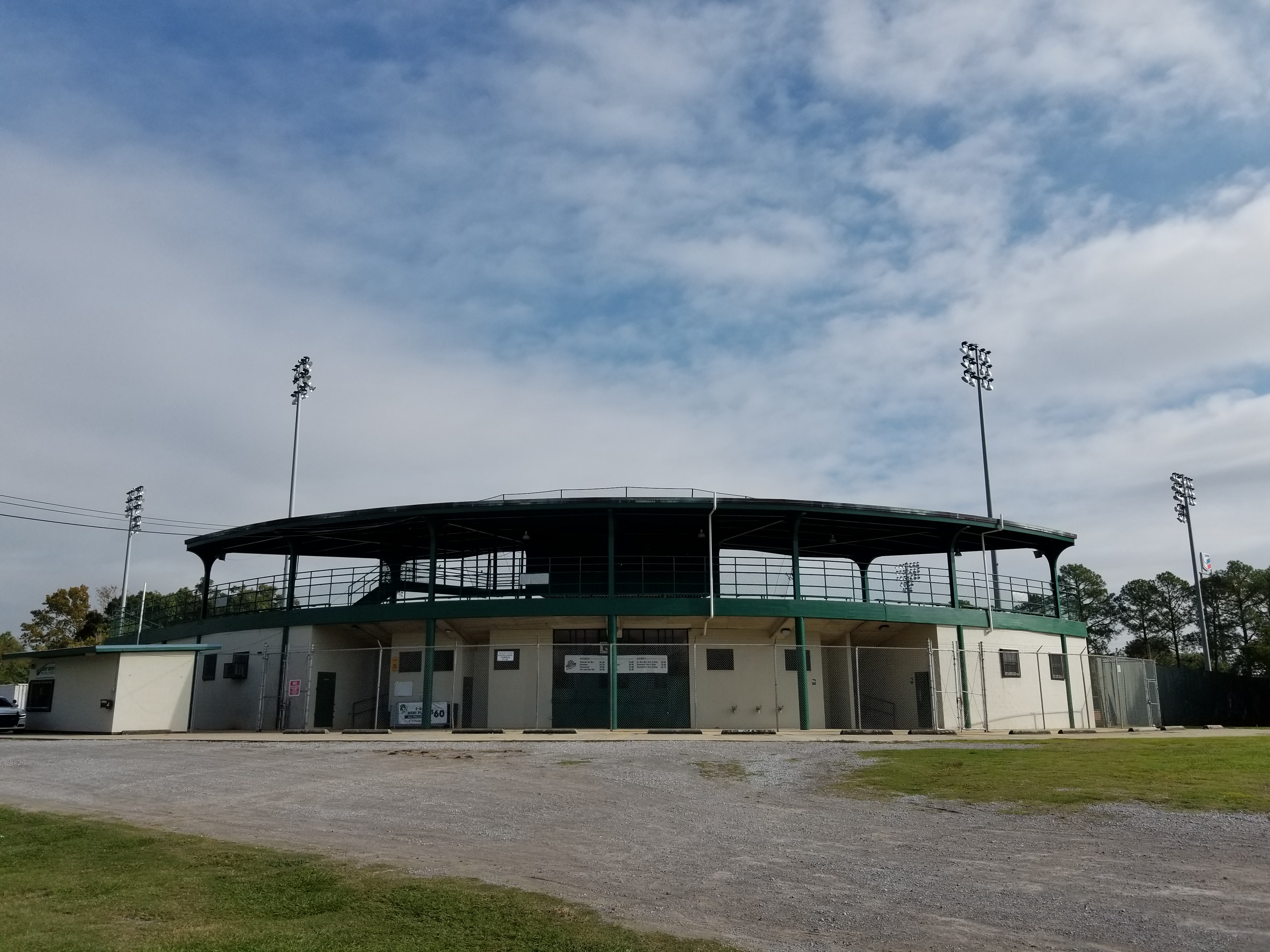
Pete Goldsby Field, BRCC Baseball

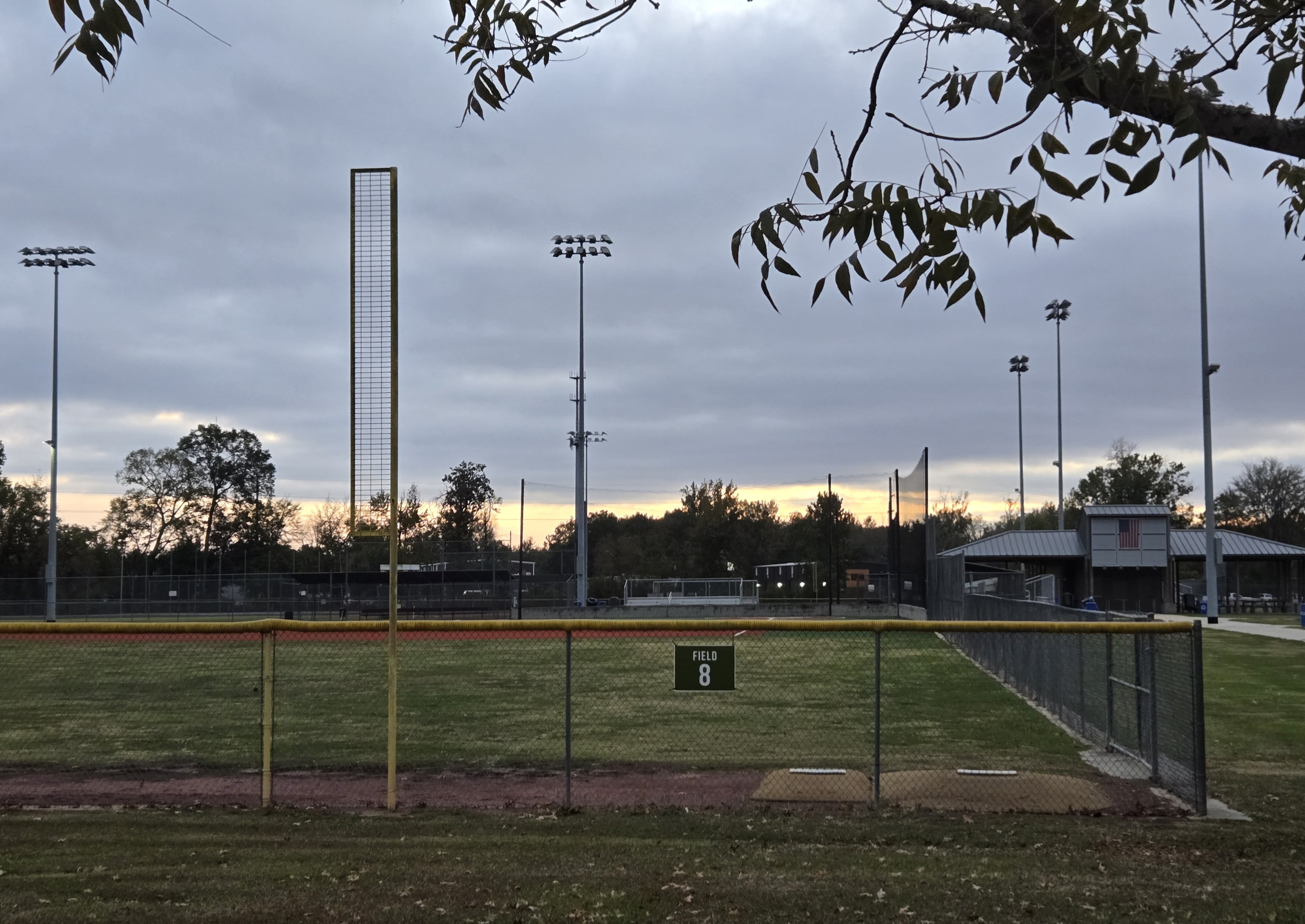
Hartley-Vey Sports Park at Oak Villa, BRCC Softball
