= Louisiana State University at Eunice =

Public junior college in Eunice, Louisiana, US

Coordinates: 30°28′29″N 92°26′03″W

Louisiana State University Eunice
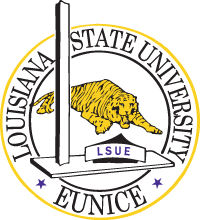
- Type: Community college and state university
- Established: 1964; 62 years ago
- Affiliations: LSU System
- Chancellor: Dr. Nancee Sorenson
- Faculty: 136
- Administrative staff: 94
- Students: 4,074: 1,394(FT), 2,680(PT)
- Location: Eunice, Louisiana, United States
- Campus: Rural 180+ acres (.728 km^{2})
- Athletics: NJCAA - LCCAC
- Colors: Purple and gold
- Nickname: Bengals
- Website: lsue.edu
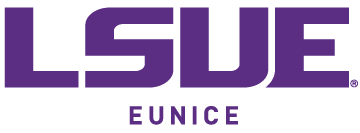

Louisiana State University Eunice (LSU Eunice or LSUE) is a public junior college in Eunice, Louisiana, United States. It is the only junior college associated with the Louisiana State University System. It enrolls over 4,000 full and part-time students and has the highest transfer rates among all two-year institutions in Louisiana.

== History ==
LSU Eunice was founded in 1964 by the Louisiana State Legislature to provide basic higher education opportunities to students located in southwest Louisiana. The LSU Board of Supervisors approved the establishment of LSU Eunice and Louisiana State University Shreveport in 1965.

State Representative Allen C. Gremillion of Crowley was instrumental in passage of the legislation creating LSU Eunice.

Through the work of Curtis Joubert, the former mayor of Eunice, LSU-E established the Cajun Prairie Wildflower Habitat.

== Athletics ==
LSU–Eunice (LSUE) teams are athletically known as the Bengals. The university is a member of the National Junior College Athletic Association (NJCAA). Baseball and softball are Division II NJCAA independent teams, men's and women's basketball competes in Division I in the Louisiana Community Colleges Athletic Conference, and the men's and women's soccer teams are Division I NJCAA independents.

Men's sports include baseball, basketball and soccer; while women's sports include basketball, soccer and softball. Their official colors are purple and gold.

The LSU–Eunice baseball team plays at Bengal Stadium, the men's and women's basketball teams play at the HPRE Center and the softball team plays at Lady Bengal Softball Field. The men's and women's soccer teams are currently in the process of constructing a game field.

=== National Championships ===
LSU–Eunice has won six NJCAA national titles in softball and eight NJCAA titles in baseball. Women's basketball has made two appearances at the NJCAA National Tournament and finished as high as fourth in 2007.

- Baseball (8): 2006, 2008, 2010, 2012, 2015, 2018, 2021, 2024
- Softball (6): 2011, 2013, 2014, 2016, 2017, 2019

=== MISS-LOU/LCCAC Conference Championships ===
- Women's basketball (4): 2014, 2018, 2019, 2020
- Men's Basketball (1): 2020

=== Region 23 Championships ===
- Baseball (12): 2003, 2004, 2006, 2008, 2009, 2010, 2012, 2013, 2015, 2018, 2021, 2024
- Softball: (6): 2009, 2011, 2012, 2013, 2014, 2019
- Men's Soccer (2): 2018, 2019

== Notable alumni ==
- Mickey Guillory, Louisiana state representative for Acadia, Evangeline, and St. Landry parishes, 2004-2015
