= New Orleans Walk of Fame =

- New Orleans Walk of Fame logo
- Established: November 1, 2024; 18 months ago
- Location: Canal Street, New Orleans
- Type: Entertainment hall of fame
- Directors: Percy "Master P" Miller; Walk of Fame Committee
- Curator: Brandan “BMIKE” Odums
- Public transit access: New Orleans Regional Transit Authority
- Website: Official Website

The New Orleans Walk of Fame honors notable people from New Orleans, Louisiana, who made contributions to the culture of the United States. All inductees will be either born in the Greater New Orleans area or spent their formative or creative years there. Contribution can be in any area; most of the current inductees made their achievements in acting, entertainment, music, sports, art/architecture, broadcasting, journalism, science/education and literature.

The stars on the walk will display a custom engraved fleur-de-lis, permanently installed on Canal Street alongside the Riverwalk, which serves as a symbol of honor and remembrance. Master P collaborated with visual artist Brandan “BMIKE” Odums to create the historic NOLA Walk of Fame's colorful fleur-de-lis. BMike is also a New Orleans native who represents the culture of the "Crescent City" and engages in a transnational dialogue about the intersection of art and resistance through exhibitions, public programs, and artworks. The stars and plaques are to be set into the sidewalks along a stretch of Canal Street, New Orleans on the Riverwalk.

== History ==
NOLA Walk of Fame is a 501(c)(3) charitable organization whose goal is to preserve and promote New Orleans's rich cultural heritage. The concept was sparked by Percy "Master P" Miller, who was named the city's official Entertainment Ambassador in August 2024 by Mayor LaToya Cantrell. The project is set to be completed by February 6, 2025, three days before Super Bowl LIX, which New Orleans will be the host of. There are 50 planned inaugural inductees.

Partnerships include the New Orleans Chamber of Commerce and Operation Restoration.

On November 26, 2024, New Orleans city leaders held a groundbreaking ceremony to debut some honorees for the New Orleans Walk of Fame. The two Louisiana natives whom officially got their fleur de lis plaques unveiled on Canal Street were Raising Cane's owner Todd Graves and rap legend Lil Wayne ahead of the official unveiling ceremony just before Super Bowl LIX in 2025.

== Selection process ==
Leading the “NOLA Walk of Fame” initiative is the Walk of Fame Committee, a dedicated group of individuals committed to preserving New Orleans's cultural heritage.

As of November 4, 2024, the Committee Members consist of:

- Alvin McMillian
- Sevetri Wilson
- Timothy Francis
- Troy Gant
- Eric Eskridge
- Gwen Priestley
- Joshua T. Bursh
- Eron Rousell, Office of Cultural Economy

== Inductees ==
- Troy "Trombone Shorty" Andrews
- Louis Armstrong
- Jon Batiste
- Gayle Benson
- Tom Benson
- Drew Brees (Honorary)
- Ella Brennan
- LaToya Cantrell (Honorary)
- Dwayne "Lil Wayne" Carter, Jr.
- Leah Chase
- Harry Connick, Jr.
- Al Copeland
- Clyde Drexler
- Ellen DeGeneres
- Fats Domino
- Pete Fountain
- Norman Francis
- Big Freedia
- Oretha Castle Haley
- John Georges
- William Goldring
- Todd Graves
- Bryant Gumbel
- Mahalia Jackson
- Avery Johnson
- Blaine "Mr. Mardi Gras" Kern
- Moon Landrieu
- Khaled "DJ Khaled" Khaled
- Archie Manning
- Eli Manning
- Peyton Manning
- Anthony Mackie
- Wynton Marsalis
- Percy "Master P" Miller
- Marc Morial
- Ernest "Dutch" Morial
- Allison "Tootie" Montana
- Aaron Neville
- Tyler Perry
- Wendell Pierce
- Malcolm "Dr. John" Rebennack, Jr.
- Cedric Richmond
- Irma Thomas
- Allen Toussaint
- Sidney D. Torres IV
- A.P. Tureaud
- Reese Witherspoon
- Bryan "Birdman" Williams & Ronald "Slim" Williams
- Carl Weathers
- Mia "Mia X" Young

== Other history ==
On November 2, 2024, during the Lil WeezyAna Fest, Lil Wayne received a tribute from New Orleans. Mayor LaToya Cantrell presented him with the key to the city. Also, fellow New Orleans icon Master P announced the creation of the NOLA Walk of Fame and presented Wayne with a fleur-de-lis plaque to mark this honor. Additionally, February 6-7 will now be celebrated as "Lil Wayne Day" in New Orleans.

== See also ==
- List of awards for contributions to culture
- List of halls and walks of fame
- List of people from New Orleans
