= Louis Berry =

American lawyer

- Born: October 8, 1914; Alexandria, Rapides Parish; Louisiana, USA
- Died: May 3, 1998 (aged 83); Lafayette, Louisiana
- Education: Howard University School of Law
- Occupations: Civil rights attorney Dean, Southern University Law Center (1972-1974)
- Political party: Democrat

Louis Berry (October 9, 1914 – May 3, 1998) was the first African American permitted to practice law in his native formerly segregated city of Alexandria in Rapides Parish in Central Louisiana.

== Background ==
A son of Frank Berry Sr., a tailor and grocer in Alexandria, Louis Berry graduated in 1941 from historically black Howard University School of Law in Washington, D.C.

On August 1, 1945, Berry became the first African-American admitted to the practice of law in Louisiana since A. P. Tureaud in 1927. Berry hoped to join Tureaud's law practice, in New Orleans, but Tureaud could not financially take on another lawyer at that time. Instead, Berry practiced with John Perkins, who was licensed in Mississippi, not Louisiana. In 1947, with the opening of Southern University Law Center in Baton Rouge, several black lawyers were recruited to join the faculty. Berry served as dean of Southern Law Center from 1972 to 1974.

== Legal practice ==
Berry returned to his native Alexandria sometimes prior to 1950. Under the custom of the time, a new lawyer had to be introduced to the local bar association. When other white attorneys turned down Berry and privately ridiculed him, Camille Gravel, a high-powered criminal defense lawyer with political connections in both Baton Rouge and Washington, called Berry and offered to introduce him to their legal colleagues. This action was considered politically courageous in the segregated system of the American South. Berry filled the role as the only black lawyer in Alexandria much as Jesse N. Stone, later the president of the Southern University System in Baton Rouge, had done in Shreveport.

Berry worked with black ministers in Rapides Parish to register African-American citizens under the Voting Rights Act of 1965. Passage of the law, signed by U.S. President Lyndon B. Johnson, led to a large increase in black voter participation in Alexandria. The former civics test covering highlights of the Constitution of the United States was dropped as a condition for registration.

The Alexandria Daily Town Talk attributed much of the improvement in living conditions in the black community to Berry's activism. The newspaper quoted Berry as having said: "Young people will be surprised to know the conditions under which blacks had to exist at the time, for they really had no rights that anybody was bound to respect."

In 1996, some two years before his death in Lafayette, Louisiana, Berry was inducted into the Louisiana Political Museum and Hall of Fame in Winnfield. Camille Gravel had been inducted a year earlier in 1995.
