= Baton Rouge College =

American school in Louisiana (1893–)

Location
- Baton Rouge, Louisiana, United States; 30.44252°N 91.17188°W

Information
- Former name: Baton Rouge Academy
- Religious affiliation: Baptists
- Opened: September 23, 1893
- Affiliation: Baptist Fourth District Association

Baton Rouge College, originally Baton Rouge Academy, was a private Baptist school for African American students, founded in 1893 in Baton Rouge, Louisiana. The school served in many capacities, including in its early history as a grammar school, a high school, and a normal school.

== History ==
J. L. Croosley served as its first principal. The school offered elementary school, secondary school, and normal school education in the early years. It was in a brick building. Land for it was purchased on Perkins Road by the Baptist Fourth District Association.

The Fourth District Association published the Baton Rouge Banner newspaper. L. F. Germany was its editor, publisher, and proprietor.

On November 1901, Joseph Samuel Clark became the second principal, before leading Southern University. Joseph Samuel Clark's son Felton Grandison Clark attended the school, and became an educator. Bishop W. M. Taylor was also a leader at the school.

Two photos of the school from 1905 and 1906 are extant in the archives at John B. Cade Library at Southern University and A&M College.
