= G. Leon Netterville =

President of Southern University
- In office 1968–1972
- Preceded by: Felton Grandison Clark
- Succeeded by: Jesse N. Stone

Personal details
- Born: July 16, 1906 Ascension Parish, Louisiana, U.S.
- Died: February 12, 2000 (aged 93) Baton Rouge, Louisiana, U.S.
- Spouse: Rebecca R. Netterville
- Children: 1 son and 1 daughter (Both deceased)
- Education: Southern University; Columbia University

G. Leon Netterville (July 16, 1906 - February 12, 2000) was an African-American academic administrator. He served as the president of Southern University, a historically black university and land grant college in Baton Rouge, Louisiana, from 1968 to 1972.

== Early life ==
Netterville was born on July 16, 1906, in Ascension Parish, Louisiana. He graduated from Southern University, where he earned a bachelor's degree. He subsequently earned a master's degree from Columbia University.

== Career ==
Netterville returned to his alma mater, Southern University, as the dean of men and business manager in 1938. He was vice president for finance and business affairs in 1967, and he served as president from 1968 to 1972. In November 1972, he fired two faculty members who had advised Civil Rights activists during protests. He retired shortly after two students were shot on campus.

== Personal life and death ==
With his wife Rebecca, Netterville had a son, George Leon Netterville III and daughter Rebecca Roberta Netterville preceded him in death. Netterville resided in Baton Rouge. He is survived by his granddaughter Rebecca Netterville.

Netterville died on February 12, 2000, in Baton Rouge, at 93.
