= Tureaud =

Tureaud is a surname. Notable people with the surname include:

- A. P. Tureaud (1899–1972), American attorney
- A. P. Tureaud Jr. (born c. 1936), African-American speaker, artist, educator, and author
- Mr. T (born Laurence Tureaud, 1952), American actor, television personality, and wrestler
