= J. S. Clark =

J. S. Clark may refer to:

- James S. Clark (1921–2000), American politician in Alabama
- John S. Clark (1885–1956), entomologist
- Joseph Samuel Clark (1871–1944), African-American academic administrator
- Joseph Sill Clark Sr. (1861–1956), American tennis player and attorney
- Joseph S. Clark Jr. (1901–1990), American author, lawyer and politician
