= Health and Physical Education Complex =

Health and Physical Education Complex may refer to:

- Health and Physical Education Complex (BPCC), an athletic complex at Bossier City Community College
- Health and Physical Education Complex (FVSU), an athletic complex at Fort Valley State University
- Health and Physical Education Complex (SUSLA), an athletic complex at Southern University at Shreveport
