= Peter Entell =

American documentary filmmaker

- Born: 1952 (age 73–74); New York City
- Occupation: documentary filmmaker
- Years active: 1975–Present
- Website: AHomeFarAway.com; ShakeTheDevilOff.com; DewInTheSun.com

Peter Entell is an American-born documentary filmmaker, living in Switzerland. He has both American and Swiss nationality. He has filmed in Europe, Africa, and Asia on film projects with social, political, and environmental subjects.

== Biography ==
Entell was born in New York in 1952 and moved to Switzerland in 1975, where he began to work for the United Nations High Commissioner for Refugees (UNHCR) as a sound recordist.

The first film he directed was Moving On: The Hunger for Land in Zimbabwe, at the behest of the Belgian-Zimbabwe Friendship Association.

Other films which Entell produced and directed include:

Depending on Heaven, two films on the life of Mongols in China. (1988)

The Tube, an investigation led by a journalist who tries to discover the truth about how the television affects our brains. It first was released in 2001. He re-edited the film in 2009.

Josh’s Trees, the story of the filmmaker’s best friend who dies when his son is less than a year old. Years later the boy is just beginning to ask questions about his father. (2005)

Shake the Devil Off, a film musical about New Orleans after Hurricane Katrina, emphasizing St. Augustine Church and its pastor Jerome LeDoux. (2007)

In 2012, Entell released A Home far Away, about fellow Americans, Broadway, television and Hollywood actress Lois Snow and her husband Edgar Snow, author of the best-selling book Red Star Over China, first American correspondent to interview Mao Tse-tung, and first American to film Mao.

Like Dew in the Sun explores why people can't live together in peace. After centuries of hatred, violence and massacres, Ukraine is at war once again. An opera about a filmmaker’s journey to the land of his ancestors. (2016)

Sisters A story of abandonment and discovery, of silence and of sharing, of how fate has shaped the lives of three women and of how their efforts have changed their lives.

Getting Old Stinks about the filmmaker and his own mother and father. The film explores the humorous and dramatic experience of aging from and about several perspectives as well a conversation around death. The film includes footage from over a fifteen year period. The filmmaker described it as an ode to life beyond the suffering.

Entell produces and directs his films himself.

== Recognition ==
Entell received a Guggenheim Foundation grant in 1988. He was nominated for the Swiss Film Prize for the Best Documentary for Rolling Also the Canvas Television Prize at the Viewpoint Documentary Now Film Festival, Belgium; Silver Spire Winner at the Golden Gate Festival, USA; Jury Prize at the Parnu Film Festival, Estonia (1997)

Moving On: The Hunger for Land in Zimbabwe : 1st Prize 'Blue Ribbon' -- International Affairs and the John Grierson Award—Best film by a new director at the American Film Festival (1983)

The Testimony of Four South African Workers : International Television Prize at the North-South Media Festival, Geneva, Switzerland; 2nd Prize, 'Struggle for Peace and Justice at the Vermont World Peace Film Festival (1988)

Josh's Trees : Grand Prize of the Jury, Montreal International Film Festival, Canada; Home Movies Award, Biografilm Festival, Italy (2005)

Shake the Devil Off : Best Editing Award, Rencontres internationales du documentaire de Montréal; Best Documentary Feature Film, Nashville Film Festival; Nomination, Best Swiss Film of the Year (2007)

== Filmography ==
Entell's documentary films include:

=== Sound engineer ===
- Men's Lives – 1976

=== Direction ===
- Moving on: The Hunger for Land in Zimbabwe (Toujours plus loin: la terre convoitée du Zimbabwe) – 1983
- Depending on Heaven (Les caprices du ciel) – 1987
- The Testimony of Four South African Workers (Le témoignage de quatre travailleurs sud-africains) – 1988
- Le manteau de pluie – 1990
- Waiting for the Caribou (En attendant le caribou) – 1991
- L'homme et le chimpanzé – 1991
- La maison du grand âge – 1992
- Martha – 1994
- Rolling – 1997
- The Tube (Le tube) – 2001, re-edited in 2009
- Josh's Trees (Les arbres de Josh) – 2005
- Shake the Devil Off – 2007
- A Home Far Away (Ailleurs, ma maison) – 2012
- Like Dew in the Sun (Comme la rosée au soleil) – 2016
- Sisters (Les sœurs) – 2018
- Getting Old Stinks – 2022

== See also ==
- Edgar Snow

== Sources ==
- "A Home Far Away". Show and Tell Films. 2012.
- "Shake Off the Devil". Show and Tell Films.
- "Interview with Peter Entell". Living in Nyon. March 4, 2013.
- "Peter Entell". Documentary Alliance Films.
- "Peter Entell". Swiss Films.
- "Peter Entell: Filmography". Movies & TV Dept. The New York Times. 2015. Archived from the original on June 11, 2015.
- "Peter Entell". IMDB.
