= Tootie =

Tootie may refer to:

== People ==
- Albert Heath (1935–2024), American jazz drummer
- Allison Montana (1922–2005), New Orleans Mardi Gras icon
- Tootie Perry (1896–1946), American college football player
- Tootie Robbins (1958–2020), American former National Football League player
- Tootie Smith (born 1957), American politician

== Fictional characters ==
- Tootie Ramsey, played by Kim Fields on the sitcom The Facts of Life
- Tootie (The Fairly OddParents), a major character on the animated TV series The Fairly OddParents
- "Tootie" Smith, in the 1944 MGM musical Meet Me in St. Louis, played by child actress Margaret O'Brien

== Other uses ==
- "Tootie", a 1996 song by Hootie & the Blowfish from Fairweather Johnson

== See also ==
- Tooty, a character in the video game Banjo-Kazooie
- Toodee, a character in the children's TV series Yo Gabba Gabba!
