= St. Augustine Church (New Orleans) =

Coordinates: 29.9652°N 90.0662°W

St Augustine Catholic Church
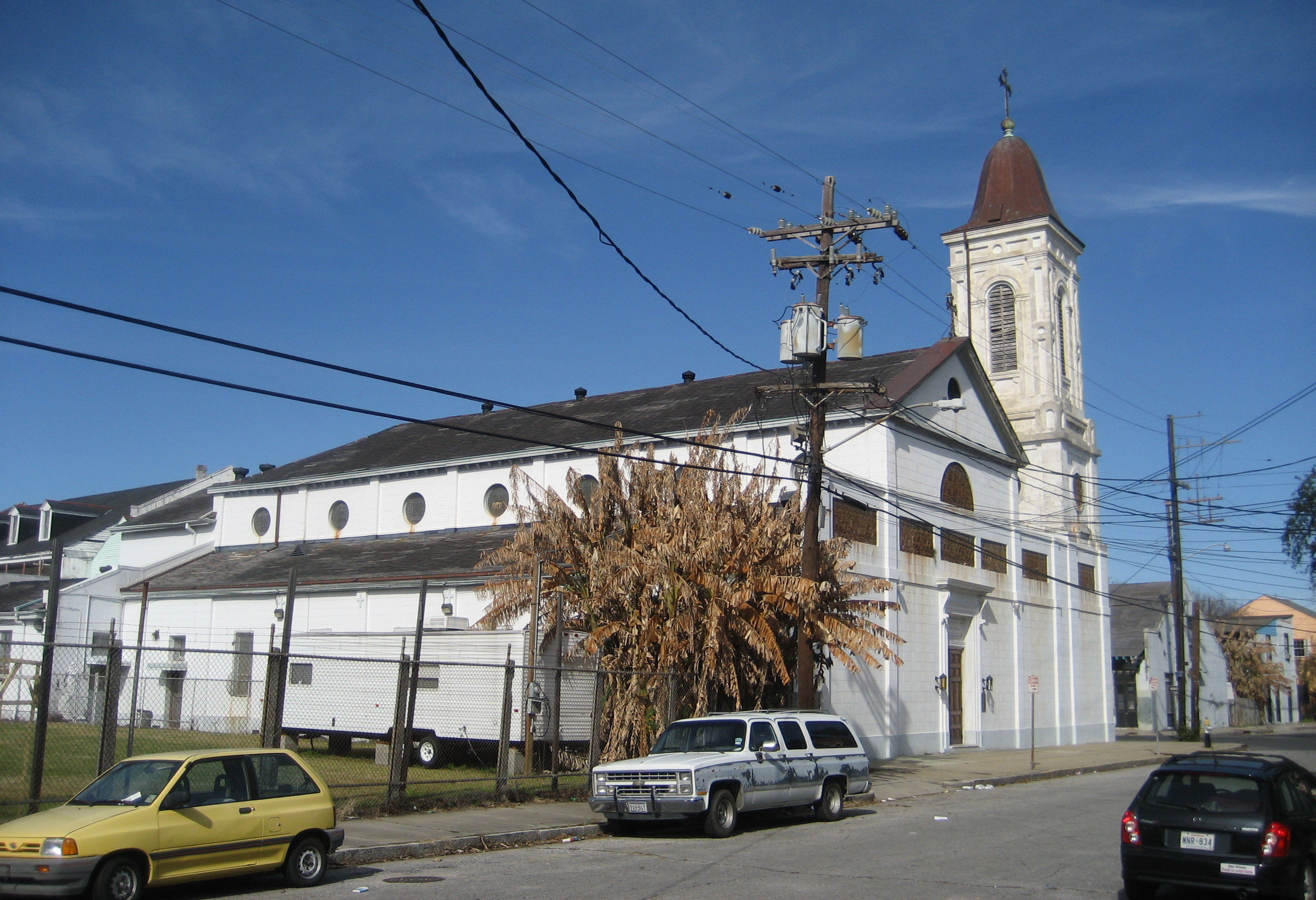
- St Augustine Catholic Church
- Location: New Orleans, Louisiana
- Country: United States
- Denomination: Catholic
- Website: staugchurch.org

History
- Founded: 1841

Administration
- Archdiocese: Archdiocese of New Orleans

Clergy
- Archbishop: Gregory Aymond

St. Augustine Church is a Catholic parish in New Orleans. Established by free people of color, who also bought pews for slaves, it is said to be the oldest Black Catholic parish in the United States, established in 1841. It was one of the first 26 sites designated on the state's Louisiana African American Heritage Trail.

The property on which St. Augustine stands was once part of the Claude Tremé plantation. It is now one of two Catholic parishes in the Faubourg Tremé. The church is located on Saint Claude Avenue at Governor Nicholls Street, a few blocks from North Rampart Street and the French Quarter.

It was founded under Bishop Antoine Blanc, who later served as New Orleans' first Archbishop, and designed by the French architect J. N. B. de Pouilly, who worked on the expansion and renovation of the more famous St. Louis Cathedral on Jackson Square.

== History ==
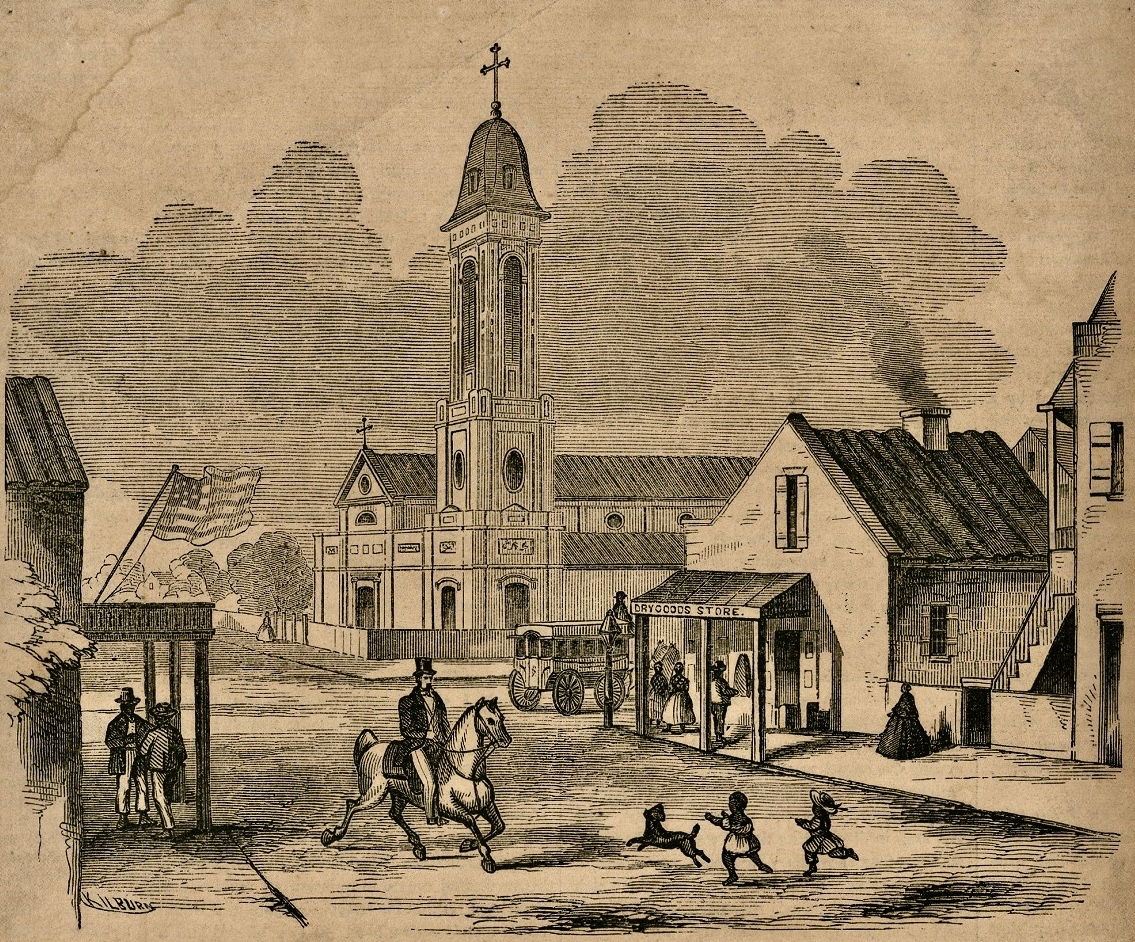
St. Augustine Church in 1858

When free people of color organized in the 1830s and received permission from Bishop Antoine Blanc to build a church, the Ursuline Sisters donated the property, on the condition that the church be named St. Augustine, after one of their patron saints, Augustine of Hippo. The church was dedicated on October 9, 1842. At a time when there were pew fees, free people of color paid for extra pews so that enslaved blacks could also attend.

A few months before the October 9, 1842 dedication of St. Augustine Church, the people of color began to purchase pews for their families to sit. Upon hearing of this, white people in the area started a campaign to buy more pews than the colored folks. Thus, The War of the Pews began and was ultimately won by the free people of color who bought three pews to every one purchased by the whites. In an unprecedented social, political and religious move, the colored members also bought all the pews of both side aisles. They gave those pews to the slaves as their exclusive place of worship, a first in the history of slavery in the United States. This mix of the pews resulted in the most integrated congregation in the entire country: one large row of free people of color, one large row of whites with a smattering of ethnics, and two outer aisles of slaves.

The Tremé has traditionally been an African-American neighborhood, although it has included a multicultural community. Along with the neighboring parish of St. Peter Claver, the parish is known in New Orleans for its association with the black Catholic community. The church hosts an annual Jazz Mass in conjunction with the Satchmo Festival, which honors Louis Armstrong's birthday; they also have a weekly Gospel Jazz Mass on Sundays. Both tend to attract tourists from around the world.

The interior of the church is historically notable. The pews are the originals and therefore date back to the mid-nineteenth century, although they were re-arranged by long-time pastor Father Jerome LeDoux so that they all faced the celebrant. The main altar is centuries old, consisting of pink Italian marble. The altar is beneath a skylight in shaped to be the "eye of God", an Egyptian symbol. The Stations of the Cross consists of ten oil paintings. Then ten stained glass windows in the church are from France and show five male saints on one side and five female saints on the other side. While the church has modern electronic bells, it also has three bells cast in 1883 for use in the 1884 World Cotton Centennial. The bells were purchased by St. Augustine Church in 1894.

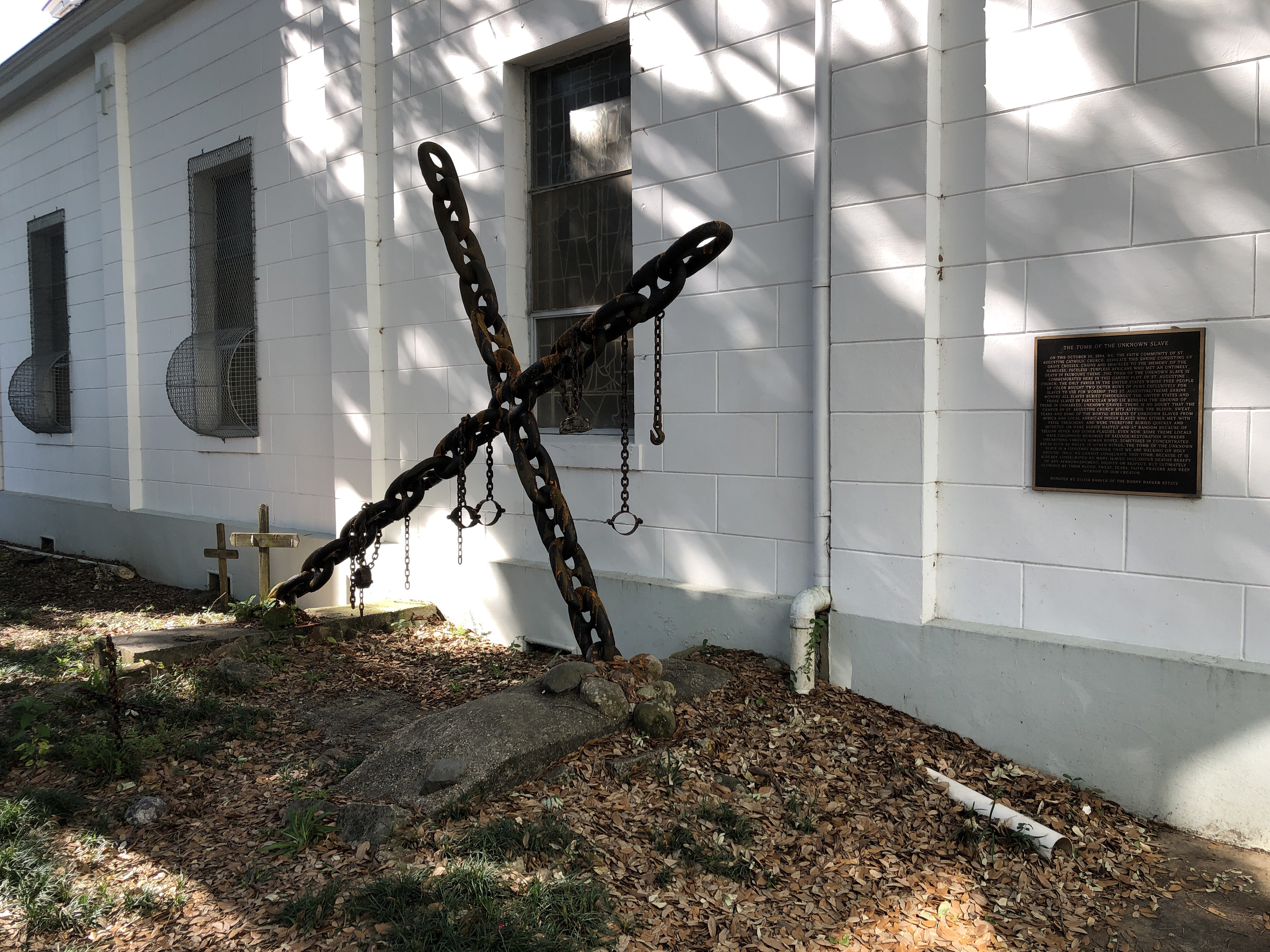
Tomb of the Unknown Slave

The Tomb of the Unknown Slave is located in a garden plot on the property of St. Augustine Church and is a monument to the many nameless or forgotten enslaved people that died before emancipation. The monument consists of large chains in the shape of a cross with small chains at the base. The parishioners that designed the monument selected this location since it was the site of the Tremé Plantation House where enslaved people lived for centuries.

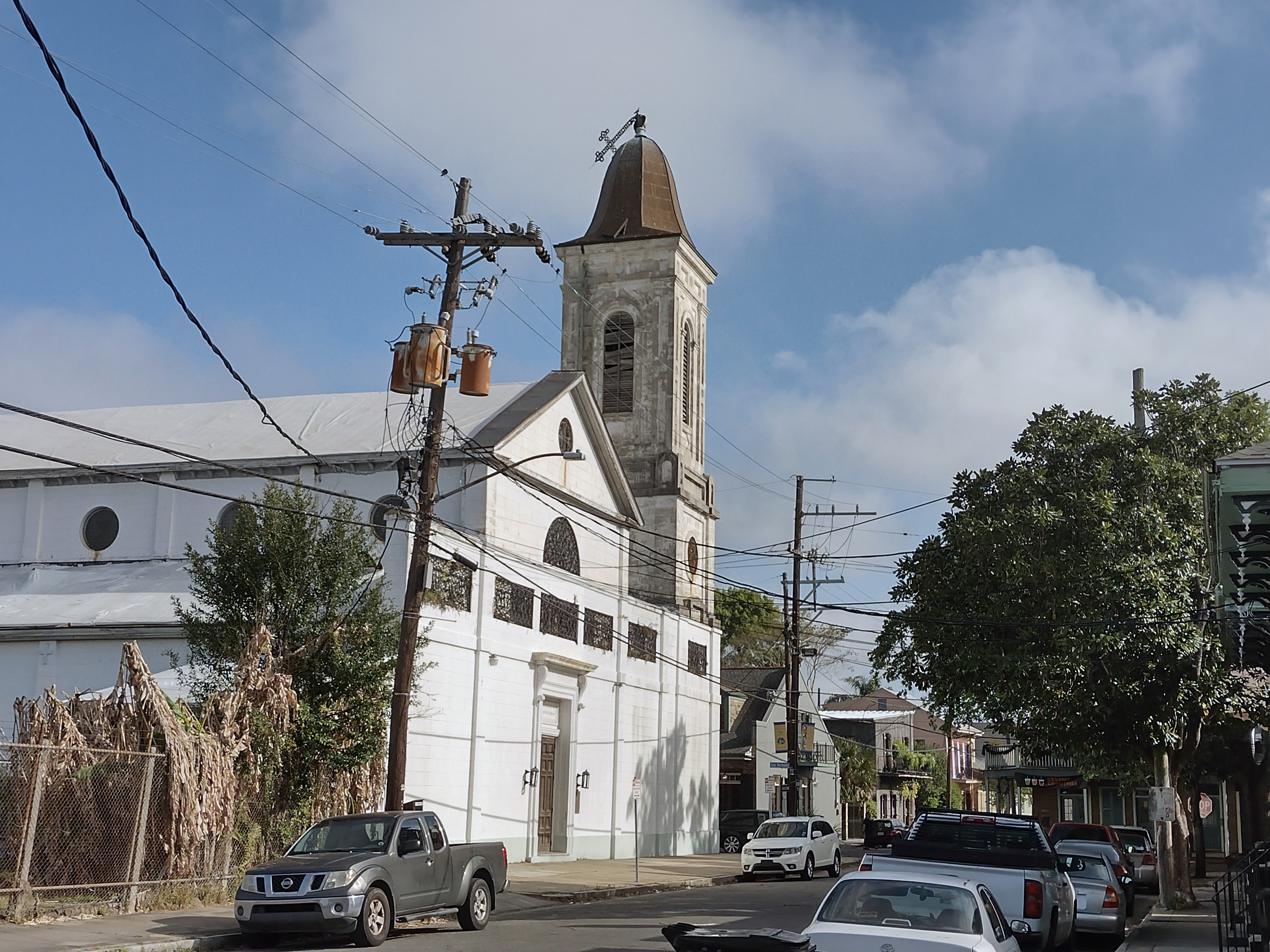
St. Augustine Church after the cross atop the steeple was damaged in 2021

Because of substantial property losses in the city after Hurricane Katrina and a decline in population, the diocese decided to close St. Augustine Church, despite the fact that it had been providing extensive community support. Parishioners asked hurricane relief volunteers for help in a protest. They barricaded themselves in the church's rectory to demonstrate against closure. After two weeks, parishioners and church officials agreed on a compromise.

The church was allowed to remain open after presenting a plan of action to address critical areas, including congregational growth, fund raising, and management improvements. The archdiocese would review its status after 18 months. A documentary film about the protest entitled Shake the Devil Off increased publicity for the church's efforts to survive.

In May 2008 St. Augustine Church received a $75,000 grant from the National Trust for Historic Preservation and American Express to aid in needed renovations to the historic parish hall, a center of community services. Enhanced use of the parish hall for community services was integral to the church's plans for the future. In March 2009, St. Augustine Church announced that due to its progress, the archdiocese had decided it would not be closed and had taken the church off probation.

In November 2025, the Archdiocese of New Orleans placed over 150 parishes and charities in Chapter 11 bankruptcy protection as part of a settlement plan to resolve hundreds of sex abuse lawsuits. This wave of bankruptcies included this church.

The following year, St. Augustine received a $200,000 grant in funding from the African American Cultural Heritage Action Fund. This program stems from the National Trust for Historic Preservation. The funding will help pay for masonry and plaster repairs.

== Notable parishioners ==
Famous parishioners have included civil rights activists, musicians and other artists and leaders:

- Homer Plessy (1862–1925), civil rights activist (Plessy v. Ferguson Supreme Court case)
- Sidney Bechet (1897–1959), jazz clarinetist, soprano saxophonist and composer
- A. P. Tureaud Sr. (1899–1972), civil rights attorney in New Orleans
  - A. P. Tureaud Jr. (c. 1936–), first Black undergraduate at LSU
- Allison 'Tootie' Montana (1922–2005), Mardi Gras Indian "Chief of Chiefs"
- George Herriman (1880–1944), creator of Krazy Kat comic

== See also ==
- New Orleans African American Museum
- African American Cultural Heritage Action Fund
