= Alysson Foti Bourque =

American children's book author

Alysson Foti Bourque is an American children's book author best known for The Alycat Series. Before becoming a writer, she worked as a teacher and lawyer.

== Early life and education ==
Bourque was born and raised in Lafayette, Louisiana. She attended Milton Elementary School and later studied at Ovey Comeaux High School. She earned a bachelor's degree in elementary education from the University of Louisiana at Lafayette.

== Career ==
After graduating, Bourque began her professional career as a teacher. She taught for one year in St. Martinville before deciding to pursue legal studies at Southern University Law Center in 2007. She later practiced law as an assistant attorney general for about seven years before transitioning to children's book writing.

Bourque became the creator of The Alycat Series, a collection of children's books. Before getting published, she researched ways to publish a book and queried over 200 agencies and publishers. She faced 88 rejections, but seven months later, Bourque's story was finally picked up. The Alycat Series is published by Pelican Publishing, and imprint of Arcadia Publishing.

Bourque has collaborated with non-profits to support philanthropic initiatives such as Foster the Love with the First Lady, Lafayette Walk to Defeat ALS, The Family Tree B&N Event, Wild Cat Foundation, Hayley’s Bracelet fundraiser to benefit Lurie Children’s Hospital, Operation Shower, and the RainBowie Foundation.

Her work has been featured on media outlets such as CBS News, KATC, and 4WWL.

Bourque was also interviewed by Mel Rosenberg.

== Books ==
- Bourque, Alysson F. (2022). Alycat and the Cattywampus Wednesday. Louisiana: Arcadia Publishing. ISBN 978-1-4556-2648-9.
- Bourque, Alysson F. (2022). Alycat and the Thursday Dessert Day. Arcadia Publishing. ISBN 978-1-4556-2707-3.
- Bourque, Alysson F. (2022). Alycat and the Tournament Tuesday. Arcadia Publishing. ISBN 978-1-4556-2705-9.
- Bourque, Alysson F. (2022). Alycat and the Friendship Friday. Arcadia Publishing. ISBN 978-1-4556-2709-7.
- Bourque, Alysson F. (2022). Alycat and the Monday Blues. Arcadia Publishing. ISBN 978-1-4556-2703-5.
- Bourque, Alysson F. (2023). Alycat and the Sleepover Saturday. Louisiana: Arcadia Publishing. ISBN 978-1-4556-2723-3.
- Bourque, Alysson F. (2023). Alycat and the Sunday Scaries. Louisiana: Arcadia Publishing. ISBN 978-1-4556-2779-0.
- Bourque, Alysson F. (2023). Alycat and the Copycat. Arcadia Publishing. ISBN 978-1-4556-2809-4.

== Awards and honors ==
Bourque's Alycat series received the NY Big Book Award and earned reviews from Kirkus Reviews.
