= Southern University =

Historically black college in Baton Rouge, Louisiana, US

Southern University and A&M College
- Former name: Southern University for Colored Students (1880–1890)
- Type: Public flagship historically black land-grant university
- Established: April 10, 1880; 146 years ago
- Parent institution: SU System
- Accreditation: SACS
- Academic affiliations: ORAU; TMSF; Space-grant
- Vice-Chancellor: James H. Ammons
- President-Chancellor: Dennis Shields
- Students: 7,483 (fall 2024)
- Undergraduates: 6,713 (fall 2024)
- Postgraduates: 770 (fall 2024)
- Location: Baton Rouge, Louisiana, United States; 30°31′29″N 91°11′24″W
- Campus: Urban; 512 acres (207 ha)
- Newspaper: The Southern Digest
- Colors: Columbia blue and gold
- Nickname: Jaguars & Lady Jaguars
- Sporting affiliations: NCAA Division I FCS – SWAC
- Website: subr.edu

Southern University and A&M College (Southern University, Southern, SUBR or SU) is a public historically black land-grant university in Baton Rouge, Louisiana, United States. It is the largest historically black college or university (HBCU) in Louisiana, a member-school of the Thurgood Marshall College Fund, and the flagship institution of the Southern University System. Its campus encompasses 512 acres (207 hectares), with an agricultural experimental station on an additional 372-acre (151-hectare) site, five miles (8.0 km) north of the main campus on Scott's Bluff overlooking the Mississippi River in the northern section of Baton Rouge.

Southern University's 13 intercollegiate athletics teams are known as the Jaguars, and are members of the Southwestern Athletic Conference (SWAC) in NCAA Division I. The Human Jukebox is a well known collegiate marching band that has represented Southern University since 1947.

== History ==
At the 1879 Louisiana State Constitutional Convention, African-American political leaders P. B. S. Pinchback, Theophile T. Allain, and Henry Demas proposed founding a higher education institution "for the education of persons of color".

In 1880, the Louisiana General Assembly chartered what was then called Southern University for Colored Students in New Orleans. Southern opened its doors on March 7, 1881 with 12 students. Classes were held for a time at the former Israel Sinai Temple on Calliope Street, between St. Charles and Camp Streets.

In 1890, the legislature designated Southern as a land-grant college for blacks, in order to continue to satisfy federal requirements under the land grant program to support higher education for all students in the state, while maintaining a segregated higher education system. It established an Agricultural and Mechanical department.

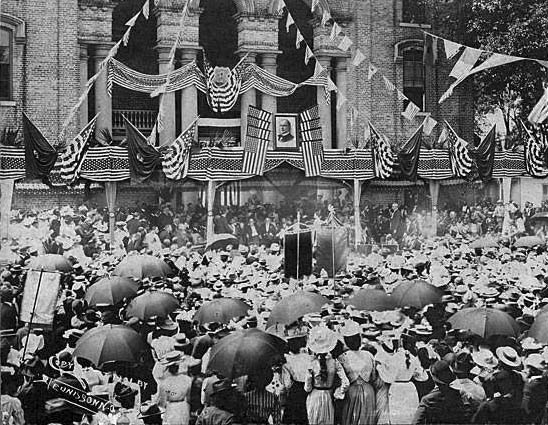
President William McKinley speaks at Southern University in New Orleans (1901)

The 1904 "Picayune Guide to New Orleans" described the university, then on the 5100 block of Magazine Street in Uptown New Orleans, as "for the education of colored persons. Coeducation is in force here. The school is excellent and the instruction of an advanced character."

For various reasons, including proximity to more rural Louisiana residents and pressure from white neighbors in the Audubon Neighborhood, which also contained Tulane and Loyola, the university moved in 1914 to Scotlandville, an area just north of Baton Rouge along Scott's Bluff facing the Mississippi River. Now absorbed into the capital, this area is included as a historic destination of the Louisiana African American Heritage Trail. The college's first president after the move was Joseph Samuel Clark, an African-American leader from Baton Rouge, who previously led Baton Rouge College and the Louisiana Colored Teachers Association.

In 1921, the Louisiana Constitutional Convention authorized the reorganization and expansion of Southern University; Legislative Act 100 of 1922 provided that the institution be reorganized under the State Board of Education's control. Clark continued to preside over Southern University during its resulting expansion. Student enrollment grew from 47 to 500, and two of the school's early buildings were built during this time.

The Southern University Laboratory School System began operating in 1922. The Laboratory School was first accredited by the Southern Association of Colleges and Schools in 1936 and has conferred more than 5,000 high school diplomas since its inception.

Clark's son Felton Grandison Clark was appointed president that year. He had been serving as a dean at Southern since 1934. The State School for the Negro Deaf and Blind was established here in 1938, under Southern University's supervision. In 1943, the university was visited by First Lady Eleanor Roosevelt. F. G. Clark generated much more expansion of the university: 33 of the 114 current buildings were erected during his 30-year tenure. Student enrollment grew from 500 to nearly 10,000 by the end of his tenure.

Under segregated state education, LSU Law School had refused to admit Charles J. Hatfield, III, an African American college graduate who filed a lawsuit in 1946 to gain professional education in the state. A special Louisiana Convention established a law program in 1947 at Southern University; it is now known as the Southern University Law Center. F. G. Clark expanded affiliated centers for Southern University, founding Southern University at New Orleans (SUNO, 1956) and Southern University at Shreveport (SUSLA, 1964). They were officially incorporated by the legislature into the Southern University System in 1974.

In 1969, Clark retired and G. Leon Netterville was selected as president. On November 16, 1972, in a second day of protests as students demanded to be included in determining administration policies and decisions, Denver Smith and Leonard Brown were shot during a protest outside the Old Auditorium (now the Southern University Museum of Art). The murders have never been solved, but the students were killed with buckshot, which the sheriff's deputies were using. These two students were involved with "Students United", a student activist group. The governor and sheriff's office denied that their people were responsible for the deaths. Governor Edwin Edwards ordered the campus temporarily closed, and it was patrolled by troops to keep the peace.

The institution continued to grow. In 1974, a special session in the Louisiana Legislature established the Southern University System, with Jesse N. Stone of Shreveport as its president. The system consists of Southern University and A&M College, Baton Rouge (SUBR); Southern University, New Orleans (SUNO); Southern University Law Center (SULC); Southern University Agricultural Center (SUAC); and Southern University, Shreveport (SUSLA). SUSLA is a two-year commuter college.

Between 1970 and 1990, the university consistently enrolled over 10,000 students and became the nation's largest HBCU.

Between 2004 and 2013, Southern University ranked 4th in the nation for baccalaureate-origin institution of black male doctorate recipients.

In 2013, the American Association of University Professors censured Southern University "for its decision during the 2011-12 school year to lay off 19 tenured professors while giving the faculty little to no say in the matter."

In 2021, Southern attained the R2 Carnegie Classification (Doctoral University; High Research Activity). It is one of only 11 HBCUs to be granted R2 status and the first HBCU in Louisiana in this category.

== Academics ==
Academic rankings

Master's
- Washington Monthly: 104

Regional
- U.S. News & World Report: 114–142 (South)

Southern has six degree-granting colleges and a law school on campus:

- College of Education, Arts, and Humanities
- College of Business
- College of Sciences and Engineering
- College of Social and Behavioral Sciences
- College of Sciences and Agriculture
- College of Nursing and Allied Health
- Southern University Law Center

The Southern University Law Center is one of only two public law schools in Louisiana. The law school is accredited by the American Bar Association and was established in 1947. The law school has approximately 700 full-time and part-time students and operates as an independent entity.

Southern University is the first Louisiana institution to offer degrees in philanthropic studies.

In 2023, the College of Nursing and Allied Health won Louisiana's nursing school of the year award given by the Louisiana Nursing Foundation for the sixth time. The college is one of only two in Louisiana to offer a PhD in Nursing and is the largest producer of African Americans with Master of Science in Nursing degrees in the nation.

Southern University is the only HBCU and one of six public universities in Louisiana with an engineering program.

Southern University has nationally recognized Army and Navy ROTC programs.

The Dolores Spikes Honors College is a selective non degree-granting college specifically established to provide an enhanced educational experience for undergraduates with strong academic achievements and intellectual ability. The college is named after Southern University graduate and only woman president of the institution, Dolores Richard Spikes.

Southern University and A&M College is accredited by the Southern Association of Colleges and Schools (SACS).

== Campus ==
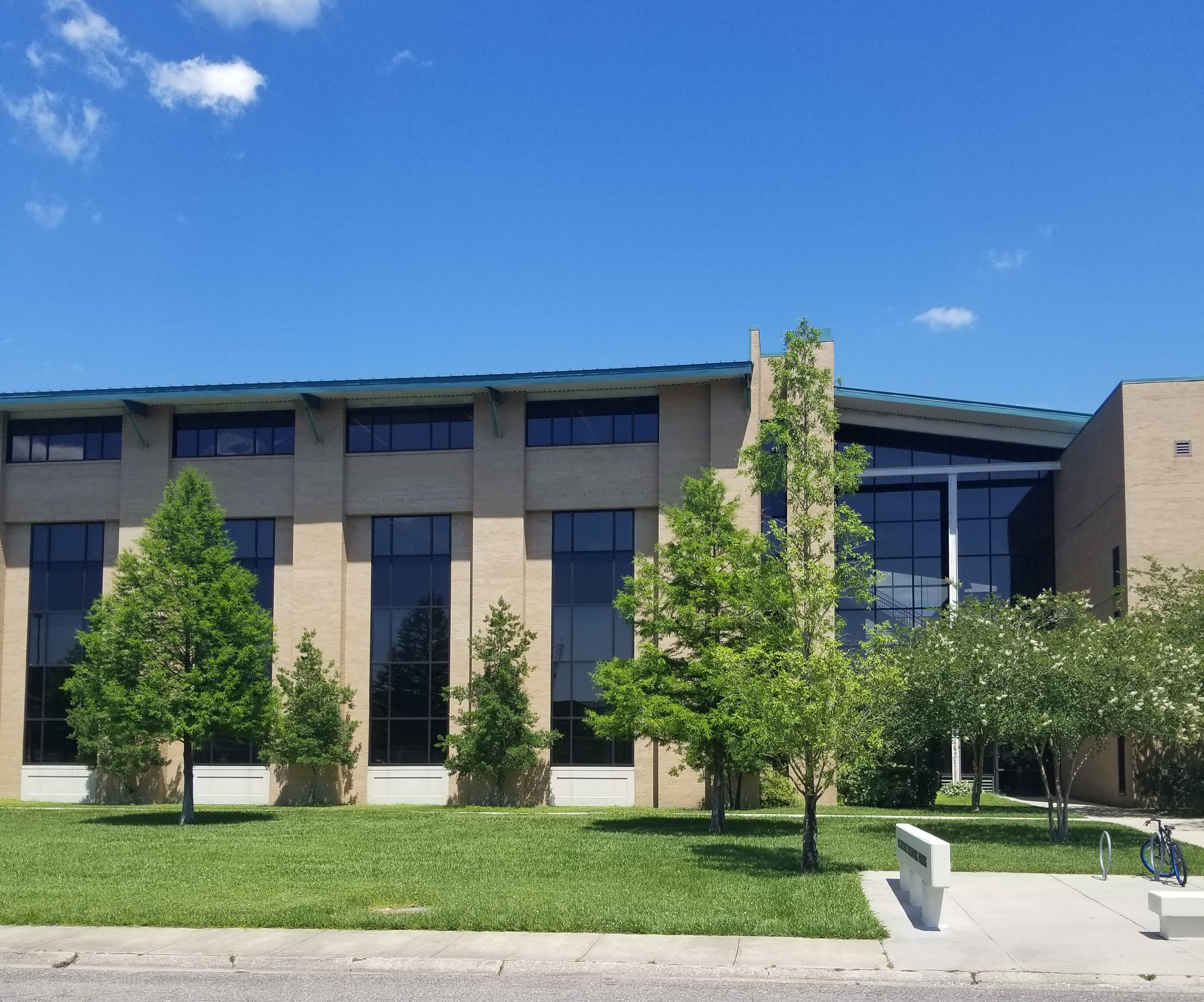
P.B.S. Pinchback Engineering Building.

Lake Kernan flows through the center of the campus and the Mississippi River forms its western boundary. Since 1960, buildings containing more than 2,000,000 square feet (190,000 m^{2}) of floor area have been constructed. The campus is often affectionately referred to as "The Bluff".

Southern University has eight on-campus residence halls.

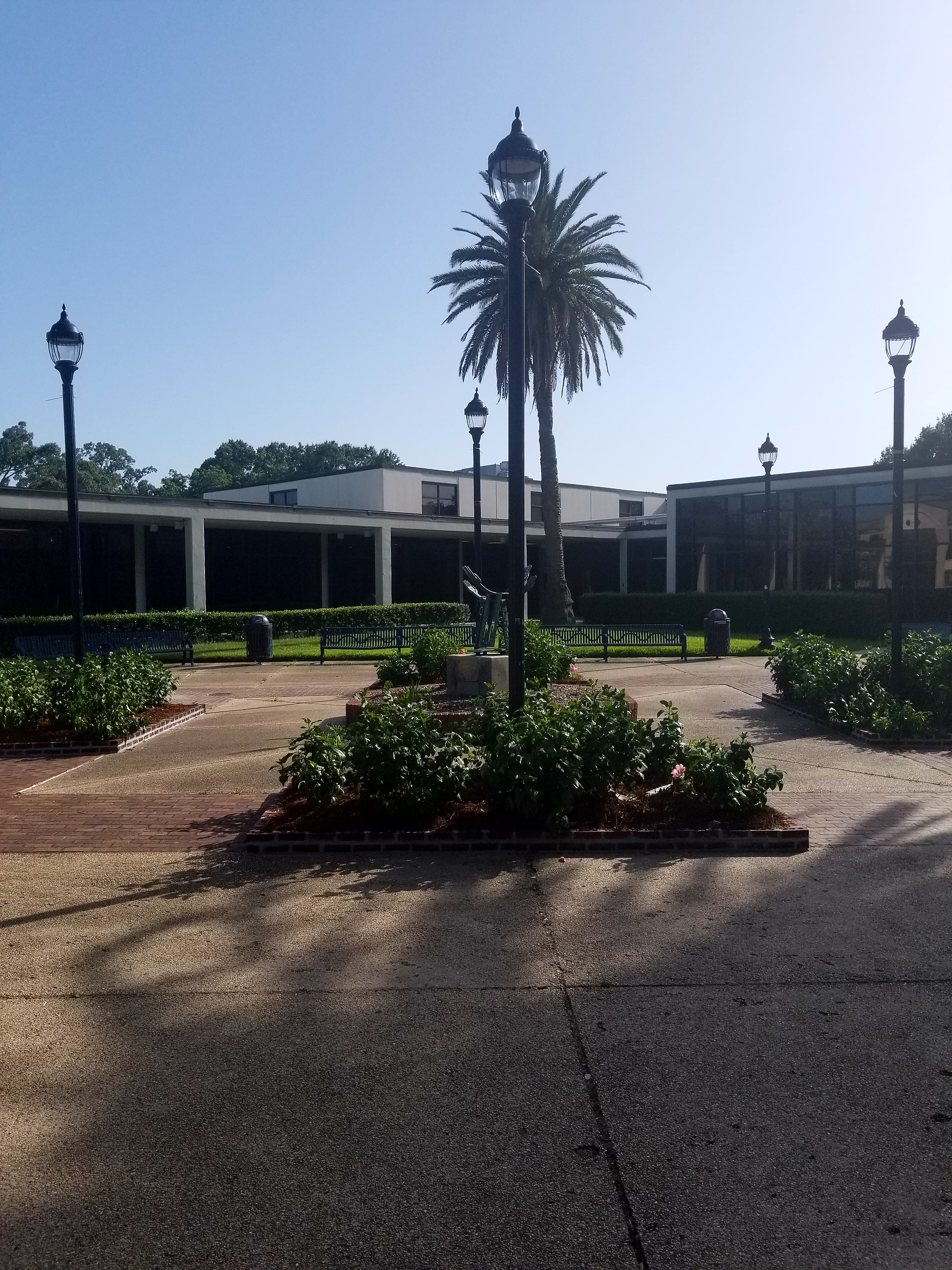
Smith-Brown Memorial Union

The Smith-Brown Memorial Union is a 66,200-square-foot (6,150 m^{2}) multipurpose building that serves as a major center for extracurricular activities. The recently renovated Union features a six food court with popular food outlets; barber and beauty shops; television rooms; 12 bowling lanes; a game room for billiards, video games, and quiet games; an art gallery; a browsing room; a ballroom, meeting and conference rooms; and a U.S. post office. The building also houses offices for student organizations.

The John B. Cade Library is a 154,000-square-foot (14,300 m^{2}) edifice named after the John Brother Cade, the first principal of Southern University Laboratory School. The library contains over a million volumes, nearly 2,000 journal subscriptions, 600,000 microforms and 1,800 recordings. The library houses the Camille Shade African-American Heritage Collection on the 3rd floor.

The F.G. Clark Activity Center has accommodations for theater, athletic events, conferences, convocations, and recreational activities. The building houses the Athletic Department.

The J.S. Clark Administration Building contains the offices of the Southern University Board of Supervisors, the Southern University System officers, the President-Chancellor of the Baton Rouge campus, and other campus administrative officers.

E.N. Mayberry Dining Hall contains the Magnolia Room, the Cypress Room and the Oak Room, which is for student dining. Dunn Cafeteria is in the Freshman Complex.

== Student demographics ==
As of fall 2022, Southern had 6,470 undergraduate students and 1,756 graduate students. 66% of students were female and 34% male. 70% of students were from Louisiana; East Baton Rouge Parish, Orleans Parish, and Rapides Parish were the top three feeder parishes. The top three feeder states for out-of-state students were Texas (647 students), Georgia (235 students), and California (202 students). There were 245 students from a foreign country. Approximately 82% of SU students identified as Black and 18% identified as non-Black.

== Athletics ==
Southern's athletics logo

The Southern Jaguars and Lady Jaguars represent the university in NCAA intercollegiate athletics. Southern's sports teams participate in Division I (FCS for football) in the Southwestern Athletic Conference (SWAC).

For more than 20 years, NBC has provided live coverage of Southern University's football game, the Bayou Classic, against its northern Louisiana SWAC rival, Grambling State University.

== Student life ==
Undergraduate demographics as of Fall 2023
Race and ethnicity	Total
Black	95%
Two or more races	2%
Hispanic	1%
Unknown	1%
White	1%
Economic diversity
Low-income (Note: The percentage of students who received an income-based federal Pell grant intended for low-income students.)	71%
Affluent (Note: The percentage of students who are a part of the American middle class at the bare minimum.)	29%

=== Southern University Marching Band ===
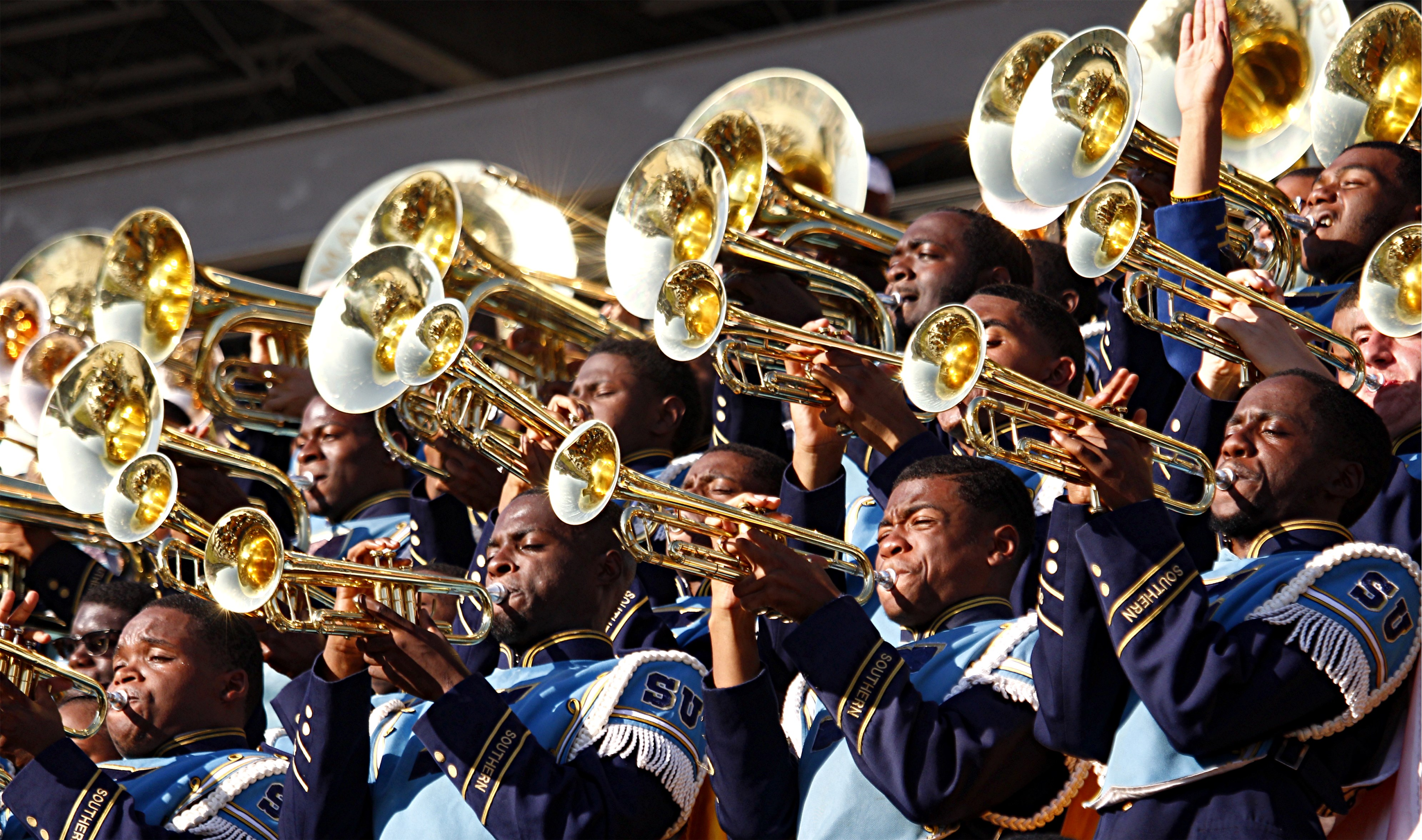
The Human Jukebox.

The Southern University marching band, better known as the Human Jukebox, has been featured in numerous television commercials, music videos and has been invited to participate in the annual Rose Parade in Pasadena, California, presidential inauguration ceremonies and six Super Bowl halftime presentations. The band was also featured in the music videos for the Jonas Brothers song, "Pom Poms" and for Lizzo song, "Good as Hell". In 2008, The band was named "Best Dressed Marching Band" by FashionNews.com, and named "#1 Band In The Nation" by USA Today. In 2014, the NCAA ranked the band second best in the nation.

=== SU media ===
The university's weekly student produced newspaper is The Southern Digest. The award-winning newspaper was established in 1926 and operates under the Southern University Office of Media Services. "The Bluff" is an Internet radio station managed by students that offers a mixture of news, interviews, and music.

=== Student organizations ===
There are nearly 150 student organizations active on campus.

== Legacy of Lacumba ==
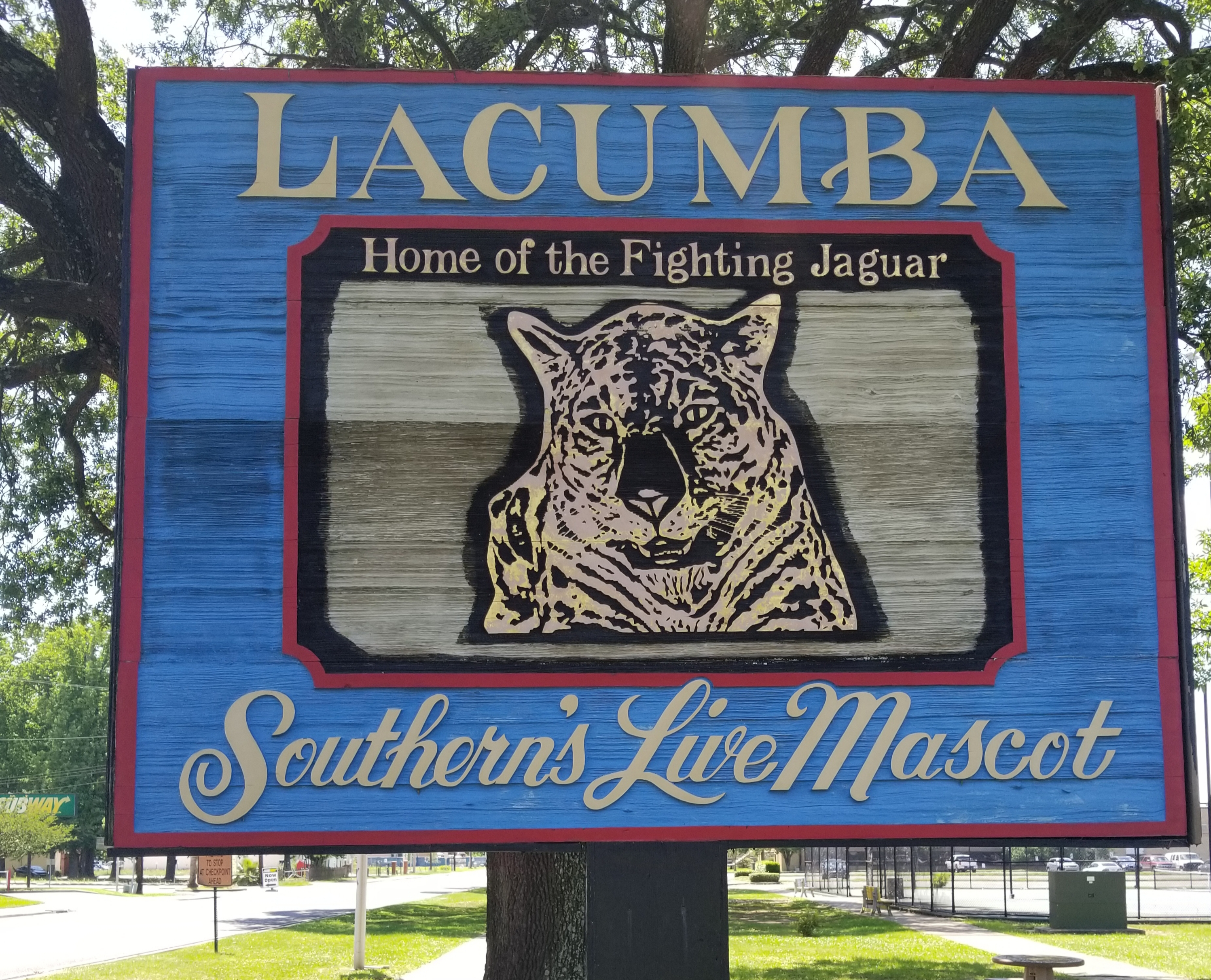
Former sign near Lacumba's campus home.

Southern University was the first HBCU to house a live exotic animal mascot on campus. Henry J. Bellaire, alumnus and president of the 1961 senior class, and alumna Helen Williams presented a baby jaguar as a gift to Southern University. The jaguar was named Lacumba (meaning "Heart of Africa") and was born on May 26, 1971. In 1991, Lacumba retired to the Acadiana Zoo in Broussard, LA and was replaced with Lacumba II. Lacumba II (commonly referred to as simply Lacumba) was born on May 12, 1991, the offspring of two rare black jaguars bred in hopes of producing a black jaguar. However, Lacumba II was born brown; it grew to be 200 pounds. Lacumba II died of natural causes at the age of 15 in December 2004 and was the last jaguar to live on campus. Animal rights advocates dissuaded the university from purchasing a new jaguar. The jaguar pen remains in front of the A.W. Mumford football stadium off Harding Boulevard. The legacy of Lacumba lives on through the school's costumed jaguar mascot, Cafe Lacumba, a bronze jaguar statue near Mumford stadium, and a jaguar named after Lacumba at the Baton Rouge Zoo.

== Notable people ==
=== Other faculty members ===
- Blyden Jackson, English professor 1954–1956, and Dean of the Graduate School
- Jacquelyne Jackson, sociology professor from 1959 to 1962
- William Moore, chemistry professor and vice chancellor for academic affairs
- Jewel Prestage, Dean of the School of Public Policy and Urban Affairs
- Morgan Watson, Professor of Engineering

== See also ==
- Southern University System
