= Sparta, Louisiana =

- Unincorporated town
- Location within Louisiana Location within the United States
- Coordinates: 32°22′03″N 93°04′47″W
- Country: United States
- State: Louisiana
- Parish: Bienville
- Elevation: 213 ft (65 m)
- Time zone: UTC-6 (Central (CST))
  - Summer (DST): UTC-5 (CDT)
- Area code: 318
- GNIS feature ID: 541193

Sparta was an unincorporated town in Bienville Parish, Louisiana, United States.

Joseph Samuel Clark (1871–1944), educator, was born in Sparta.
