= Jerome LeDoux =

American Roman Catholic priest (1930–2019)

The Reverend Jerome Gaston LeDoux SVD
- Church: St. Augustine
- Archdiocese: New Orleans

Orders
- Ordination: Society of the Divine Word, May 11, 1957

Personal details
- Born: February 26, 1930 Lake Charles, Louisiana, US
- Died: January 7, 2019 (aged 88) Opelousas, Louisiana, US
- Denomination: Roman Catholic
- Parents: Mr. Peter Louis LeDoux and Mrs. Mary Gastonia Petrie-LeDoux

Jerome LeDoux, S.V.D. (February 26, 1930 – January 7, 2019) was a Black Catholic priest best known for his ministry at St. Augustine Church in New Orleans, Louisiana. He was noted for his Afrocentric Masses, his ebullient style and his writing.

LeDoux was featured in a documentary film about St. Augustine Church in the aftermath of Hurricane Katrina. Although well known nationally, he was active primarily in Louisiana, Texas, and Mississippi.

== Biography ==
External images
- Photographs of Father Jerome LeDoux
- “Obituary photograph of Fr. LeDoux", as published in the New Orleans Times-Picayune newspaper
- "Photograph of Fr. LeDoux leading a Mardi Gras Mass", as available from alamy.com

=== Early life and education ===
LeDoux was born on February 26, 1930, in Lake Charles, Louisiana. Following the path of his older brother COL Louis Verlin LeDoux, he attended high school at the Society of the Divine Word's all-Black St. Augustine's Seminary in Bay St. Louis, Mississippi, graduating in 1947. (At the time, US Catholic seminaries did not admit African Americans, and St. Augustine's Seminary had been created in 1920 to train African-American men for the priesthood in a segregated setting.) In 1952, Louis became the first Black diocesan priest to serve in the South. His cousin, Harold Perry, became the first African-American Catholic bishop in modern history in 1966.

At St Augustine's, LeDoux's education consisted of music and the classics such as Greek, Latin, and French, in addition to religious instruction. He then completed a two-year novitiate in the SVD's main seminary in Techny, Illinois. LeDoux then attended college for two years at Divine Word Seminary in Epworth, Iowa, before completing an additional four years of theology at St. Augustine's, graduating in 1953. LeDoux was ordained thereafter, in 1957.

He then pursued graduate studies at the Gregorian University in Rome, Italy. There, he earned a master's degree in theology and a doctorate in canon law, completing these in 1961.

=== Priesthood ===
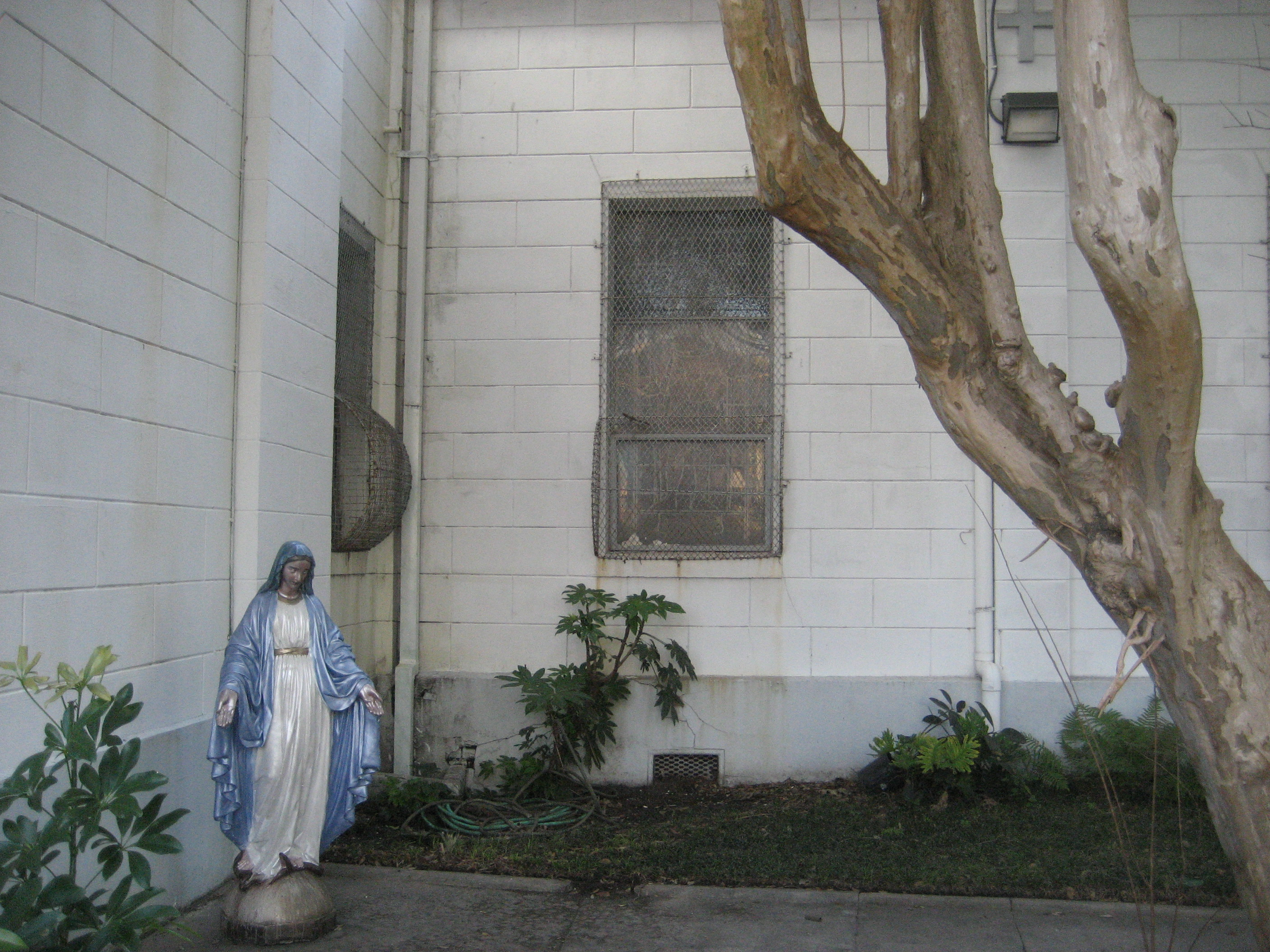
Madonna at the St. Augustine Church in New Orleans

On completion of his graduate studies, LeDoux assumed a teaching position at St. Augustine's Seminary where he taught theology and canon law from 1961 to 1967. He then became a faculty member at Xavier University of Louisiana, teaching theology, from 1969 to 1980.

Beginning in 1981, LeDoux held a series of ministries as pastor, beginning with St. Martin de Porres Church in Prairie View, Texas, where he served from 1981 to 1984. He then moved to Baton Rouge, Louisiana, where he was pastor of St. Paul the Apostle Church in Baton Rouge, Louisiana, from 1984 to 1988. LeDoux was pastor of St. Augustine Church in New Orleans, for his longest tenure, from 1990 to 2006.

==== St Augustine (New Orleans) ====
LeDoux's ebullient style became manifest during his ministry in New Orleans. He donned colorful vestments during the Mass, danced in the aisles and rode a donkey to the church on Palm Sunday. He sometimes included jazz, African drumming and dancing, Mardi Gras Indian chants, and second line parades in Masses that he ministered. Out of respect for African-American history, LeDoux sometimes wore the regalia of the Buffalo soldiers. In 2005, the New Orleans Times-Picayune newspaper wrote, "But besides the rich history of St. Augustine, the church's real draw is the weekly sermon and golden voice of LeDoux." LeDoux was known colloquially as "the people's priest" in the New Orleans region.

===== Tomb of the Unknown Slave =====
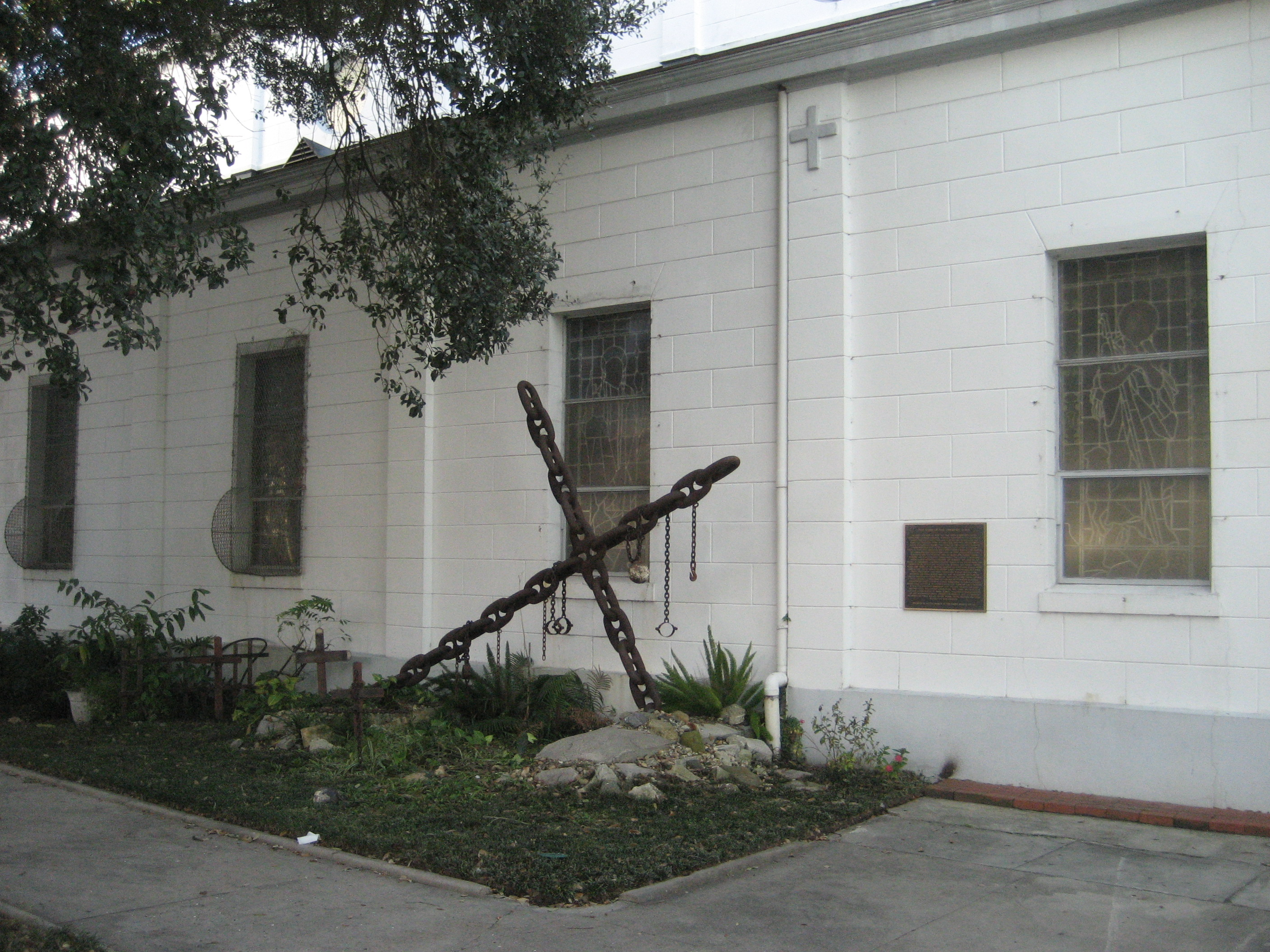
Tomb of the Unknown Slave

With several parishioners at St. Augustine Church, LeDoux conceived of the idea of a Tomb of the Unknown Slave. With the efforts of the church handyman and other interested people, the shrine was constructed and installed in a garden plot at St. Augustine Church, completed by 2005. The shrine consists of heavy chains and iron shackles in the shape of a cross, weighing approximately 1500 pounds. It includes a plaque mounted on the wall of the church. The church property was the site of an archeological dig to the Claude Tremé Plantation House, and the shrine marks graves of unknown slaves from the area.

===== Katrina and aftermath =====
On August 29, 2005, as Hurricane Katrina struck New Orleans, LeDoux opted to remain at St. Augustine Church rather than evacuate the city. Stranded at the church for eight days and being a vegan, he survived on a diet of pasta and marinara sauce, while taking in people who had lost their homes in the hurricane.

Within six months, the archbishop of New Orleans, Alfred Hughes, had decided to close the church. The congregation under LeDoux's leadership vehemently and publicly challenged this decision, for which the archbishop dismissed LeDoux as pastor. The church, however, remained open.

LeDoux then was pastor of Our Mother of Mercy Church in Fort Worth, Texas from 2006 to 2015.

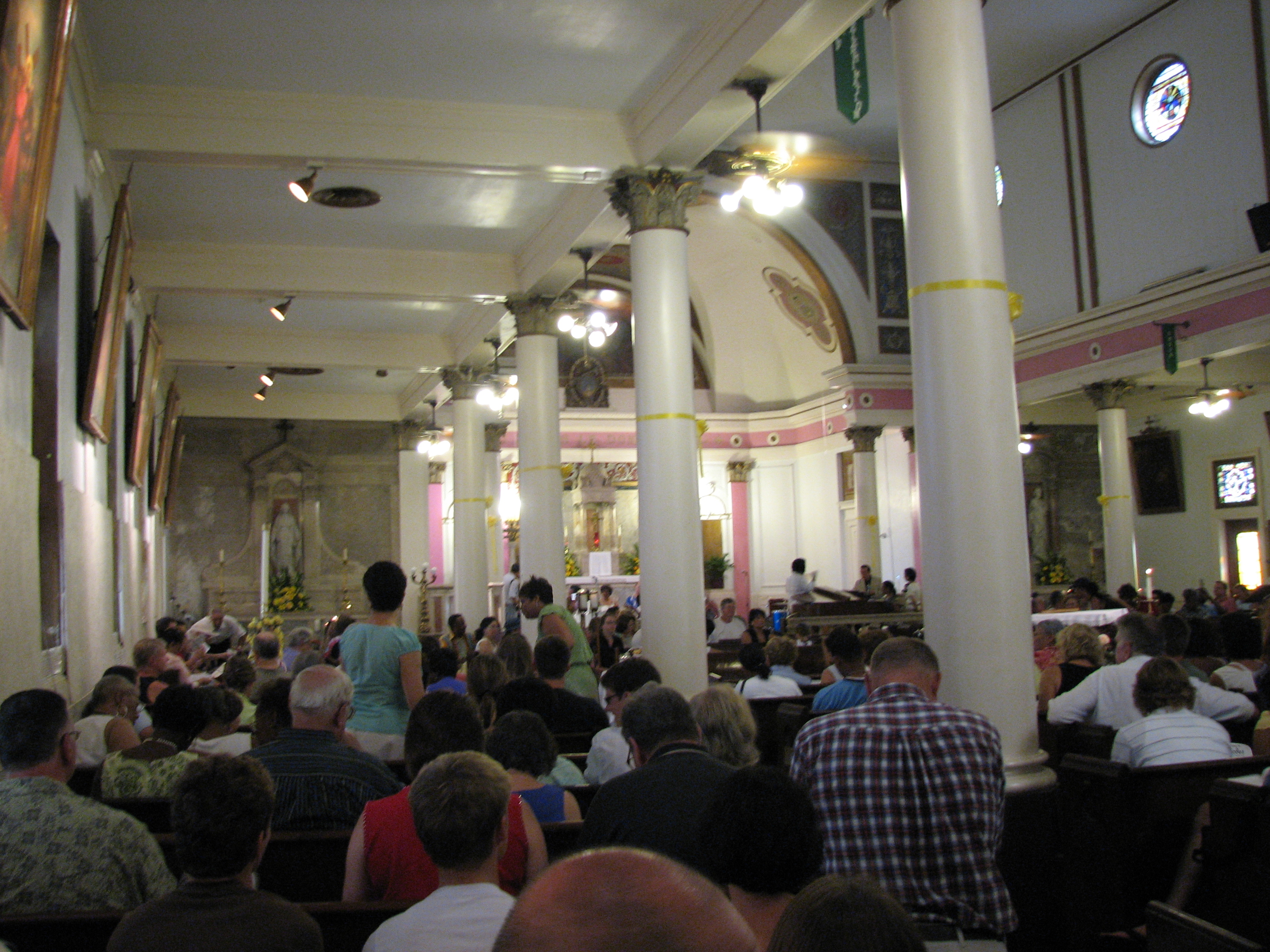
Jazz Mass at St. Augustine Church in 2007

In 2011, LeDoux authored a book, War of the Pews: A Personal Account of St. Augustine Church in New Orleans, documenting the difficulties faced by St. Augustine Church in post-Hurricane Katrina New Orleans, with the general trend in declining church attendance. The book's title relates to the early years of St. Augustine Church when pew fees were a common practice. Beginning in 1969, LeDoux wrote a weekly column "Reflections on Life" which was syndicated in The Louisiana Weekly, the Seacoast Echo, the Long Beach Times, the Opelousas Daily World and the New St. Pete Bulletin, in addition to publication in various Catholic weeklies over the years he wrote this column.

In a 2018 magazine interview, LeDoux pointed to the unifying influence that music can have, especially in New Orleans with its ethnic diversity. He contrasted the impact of music with racial identity which he said can be inaccurate in contemporary society, in which racial terms can separate people rather than unify them.

=== Death ===
LeDoux died of heart disease at Lafayette General Hospital in Lafayette, Louisiana, on January 7, 2019. At the time of his death, he was in pastoral residence at Holy Ghost Church in Opelousas, Louisiana. He is buried in the cemetery at St. Augustine's Seminary.

== Recognition ==
In 2007, St. Augustine Church honored LeDoux with a Golden Jubilee. Events in the jubilee celebration included a "jazz mass", with jazz musicians such as the Tremé Brass Band, Trombone Shorty, and the St. Augustine Soulful Voices Choir. Then New Orleans Mayor Ray Nagin declared a "Fr. Jerome LeDoux Day" for the city in 2007. Around the same time, the New Orleans City Council acknowledged the contributions of St. Augustine Church to the musical heritage of the city, which LeDoux nurtured as part of his St. Augustine ministry. As part of the 2007 recognition, New Orleans artist Richard Thomas painted a poster honoring LeDoux, with proceeds of its sale as prints benefiting LeDoux's church.

Also in 2007, filmmaker Peter Entell produced a documentary film Shake the Devil Off about St. Augustine Church and its efforts to remain open as a parish following Hurricane Katrina, made in a cinéma vérité style and featuring LeDoux as he conducts daily church business. As part of the incident, Entell highlighted the dismissal of LeDoux and his replacement by a Caucasian priest in this predominately African-American parish. In the film, Entell claimed that racism played a role in the decision of the local archdiocese. The name of the film is also the name of a gospel song which is sung by LeDoux and parishioners in the film.
