= Southern University Law Review =

Law review

- Discipline: Legal studies
- Language: English

Publication details
- History: 1974–present
- Publisher: Southern University Law Center (United States)
- Frequency: Biannual

Standard abbreviations
- Bluebook: S.U. L. Rev.
- ISO 4: South. Univ. Law Rev.

Indexing
- ISSN: 0099-1465
- LCCN: 75646875
- OCLC no.: 60620349

Links
- Journal homepage

The Southern University Law Review is a general law review published by students of the Southern University Law Center. It was established in 1974 and is published two times per year. It is abstracted and indexed in the Index to Legal Periodicals and HeinOnline.

== Past editors-in-chief ==
As listed on the journal's mastheads, the following persons are or have been editor-in-chief (incomplete list):

- 2025-2026: Maya Jones
- 2024-2025: William Gaspard Jr.
- 2023-2024: Charee Woodard
- 2022-2023: DeMario Thornton
- 2021-2022: Shearil Matthews
- 2020-2021: Chandler C. Agee
- 2019-2020: Josef P. Ventulan
- 2018-2019: Monette M. Davis
- 2017-2018: Kolby P. Marchand
- 2016-2017: S. Lamar Gardner
- 2015-2016: Rachel P. Dunaway
- 2014-2015: Cranay D. Murphy
- 2013-2014: Michael Jeb Richard
