= Joseph Samuel Clark =

President of Southern University
- In office 1914–1938
- Succeeded by: Felton Grandison Clark

Personal details
- Born: June 7, 1871 Sparta, Bienville Parish, Louisiana, U.S.
- Died: November 3, 1944 (aged 73) New Orleans, Louisiana, U.S.
- Spouse: Octavia Head
- Children: Felton Grandison Clark
- Education: Leland College

Joseph Samuel Clark (June 7, 1871 – November 3, 1944) was an academic administrator and college president who spent most of his career in Louisiana. He was the head of Baton Rouge College and president of Southern University and A&M College, both historically black colleges, where he served in total from 1901 to 1938. During the years from 1914 to 1938 he led the development of Southern, designated as a land grant college in 1890 and moved to the Baton Rouge area in 1914.

Clark was a co-founder of several African-American organizations, and served in leadership roles at the state and national level in associations for African-American educators. In 1931 he declined an offer of the ambassadorship to Liberia by Republican President Herbert Hoover, as he was devoted to his mission of developing Southern University.

== Early life and education ==
Joseph Samuel Clark was born on June 7, 1871, in Sparta, an unincorporated community in Bienville Parish, Louisiana, to Jane Clark. His grandfather, Philip Clark, was the only father he'd ever known. He attended local public schools, which were segregated, and also had some private study. Later he attended two preparatory colleges (equivalent to today's high school) before going to Leland College, a historically black college, where he graduated in 1901 with a bachelor's degree. He also did some post-graduate work at the University of Chicago and Harvard University.

== Career ==
Clark started as a teacher but was soon appointed as an administrator. In 1901 he was chosen as head of Baton Rouge College, serving until 1912. Clark was next selected as president of Southern University and A&M College, a state university founded in New Orleans that was designated in 1890 as a land grant college for blacks. In this role, he supervised the relocation in 1914 and development of the school in the small farming community of Scotlandville in East Baton Rouge Parish, where the state had bought more than 500 acres of land. Soon the property totaled 884 acres, as the state acquired more to support the agricultural program. Only one black family lived in the village when the college was relocated, although there were black farmers and sharecroppers in the area. By the end of his tenure, Clark supervised a college with 1,400 enrolled students. The college contributed to the growth of the community, which was also based on manufacturing. By the later 20th century, it became the largest majority-African American community in the state. Scotlandville was later incorporated as part of the city of Baton Rouge.

Clark was also active in education-related organizations. He served for eight years as the president of the Louisiana State Colored Teachers' Association. He was a co-founder of the National Colored Teachers Association in 1906, later known as the American Teachers Association, and served a year as president. He was also a co-founder of the National Negro Business League and the National Urban League. In 1931 Republican US president Herbert Hoover offered Clark the post of United States Ambassador to Liberia. He turned it down because he was deeply involved in developing Southern University.

Clark received honorary doctorates from Selma University, Leland College, and Arkansas Baptist College.

== Personal life and death ==
Clark married Octavia Head on December 29, 1901. They had one son, Felton Grandison Clark, who also had a career in education and succeeded his father as president of Southern University in 1938.

Clark died on November 3, 1944, in New Orleans.
