= Felton Grandison Clark =

President of Southern University
- In office 1938–1969
- Preceded by: Joseph Samuel Clark
- Succeeded by: G. Leon Netterville

Personal details
- Born: October 13, 1903 Baton Rouge, Louisiana, U.S.
- Died: July 5, 1970 (aged 66) New Orleans, Louisiana, U.S.
- Spouse: Allene Knighton
- Parent: Joseph Samuel Clark
- Education: Beloit College; Columbia University

Felton Grandison Clark (October 13, 1903 – July 5, 1970) was an African-American academic administrator from Louisiana. He served as the president of Southern University (SU), a historically black university and land-grant college in Baton Rouge, Louisiana, from 1938 to 1969. During this period, he led decades of expansion that resulted in the number of students increasing from 1,500 to over 11,000. By the time of his retirement, SU had grown to be America's largest historically black university by enrollment.

== Early life ==
Clark was born on October 13, 1903, in Baton Rouge, Louisiana. His father, Joseph Samuel Clark, was the president of Southern University (SU) from 1914 to 1938.

Clark graduated from Beloit College, where he earned a bachelor's degree in 1922. He did graduate work at Columbia University, where he earned a master's degree in 1925 and a PhD in 1933.

== Career ==
Clark was a professor at Wiley College from 1925 to 1927, SU from 1927 to 1930, and Howard University from 1931 to 1934. He worked for the United States Office of Education in 1936–1937.

Clark was appointed as a dean at SU in 1934. He served as its president from 1938 to 1969, overseeing large-scale development of curriculum, buildings on campus and graduate programs.

From 1960, numerous students at the university began to press for change and many were active in the civil rights movement. The university was disrupted by the Baton Rouge sit-ins of 1960.

By the time of Clark's retirement in 1969, SU had more than 11,000 students and it had become the largest historically black university in the United States by enrollment.

== Other activities ==
Clark served on the editorial board of the Journal of Negro Education. He also served as vice president of the national council of the YMCA. He was elected into the Phi Beta Kappa honor society. He attended the 1964 World Alliance Commission on Race Relationships conference in Geneva, Switzerland as a delegate.

== Personal life and legacy ==
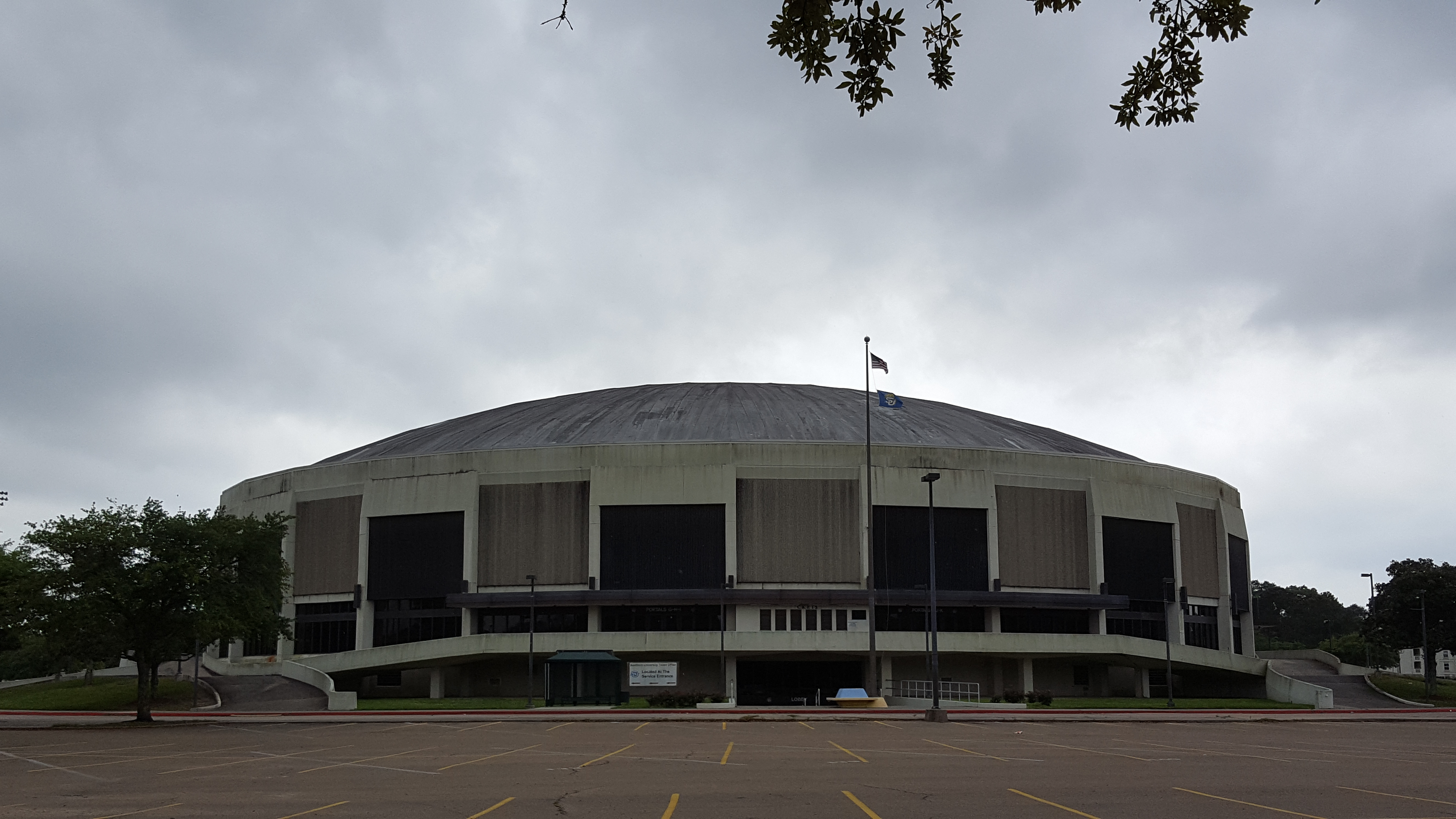
The F. G. Clark Center.

Clark married Allene Knighten in 1958. They had no children. He was a Baptist, and a 33rd degree Mason.

Clark died on July 5, 1970, in New Orleans, Louisiana, at 66. In 1946 Clark was awarded an honorary legum doctor from Beloit College.

Other honors followed his death: he is the namesake of the multi-purpose, 7,500-seat F. G. Clark Center in Baton Rouge, which opened in 1975. Felton Grandison Clark Hall, informally called Grandison Hall, is a dormitory on the SU campus that was renovated in 1991 and named for him.
