= Southern University System =

Public university system in Louisiana

- Established: 1974; 52 years ago (by the Louisiana State Constitution)
- President: John K. Pierre
- Students: 15,000
- Location: Baton Rouge, Louisiana, United States; 30°31′29″N 91°11′24″W
- Website: www.sus.edu

Southern University System Locations

The Southern University System is a system of public historically black universities in the U.S. state of Louisiana. Its headquarters are at the Joseph Samuel Clark Administration Building on the Southern University campus in Baton Rouge. The Southern University System is the only historically black college system in the United States.

== Institutions ==
The Southern University System has five institutions located throughout the state. Each institution operates its own budget and each has a chancellor.

- Southern University and A&M College at Baton Rouge (flagship school)
- Southern University at New Orleans
- Southern University at Shreveport
- Southern University Law Center in Baton Rouge (law school)
- Southern University Agricultural Research and Extension Center in Baton Rouge

=== Southern University Laboratory School ===
Southern University Laboratory School (Southern Lab) is a laboratory school under Southern University's College of Education that serves students in K-12 grades; it is located on the Baton Rouge campus. The school has been operating since 1922.

== Athletics ==
Some institutions sponsors athletic programs. Southern University and A&M College is a member of the SWAC of the NCAA Division I. Southern University at New Orleans is a member of the HBCU Athletic Conference, part of NAIA. While Southern University at Shreveport competes in the NJCAA.

== See also ==
- List of colleges and universities in Louisiana
