= Southern University Law Center =

Public school in Baton Rouge, Louisiana, US

Coordinates: 30.5249°N 91.1945°W

- Seal
- Established: September 1947; 78 years ago
- School type: Public law school
- Dean: Alvin R. Washington
- Location: Baton Rouge, Louisiana, United States
- Enrollment: 809 full- and part-time
- Faculty: 61 full- and 35 part-time
- USNWR ranking: 178-196
- Bar pass rate: 75% (July 2025 first-time takers)
- Website: www.sulc.edu

Southern University Law Center is a public law school in Baton Rouge, Louisiana. It is part of the historically Black Southern University System and was opened for instruction in September 1947. It was authorized by the Louisiana State Board of Education as a Law School for Blacks to be located at Southern University, a historically Black college, and to open for the 1947-1948 academic session.

The school offers full-time, part-time, and evening programs. For students who want to pursue the JD and MPA, the school offers a joint-degree program in cooperation with the Nelson Mandela School of Public Policy and Urban Affairs at Southern. SULC's students learn two different systems of law: Louisiana is a civil law jurisdiction (in the tradition of France and Continental Europe), while law in every other state is based on the British common-law tradition.

== History ==
In 1946, Charles J. Hatfield, III, an African-American veteran of Louisiana, applied to Louisiana State University Law School, the only state school that offered a law degree. Although he was academically qualified, he was rejected because of his race, as the state system was segregated. Hatfield filed suit against the state for rejecting his application. While he did not win in court, the State Board of Education decided to found a law school for African Americans.

The State Board of Education responded by deciding at its January 10, 1947, meeting to found a law school at Southern University to serve African-American students, to open in September of that year. On June 14, 1947, the Board of Liquidation of State Debt appropriated $40,000 for the operation of the school. The Southern University Law School was officially opened in September 1947 to provide legal education for African-American students in the state. The first dean of the law school was Aguinaldo Alfonso Lenoir, Sr. After 38 years of operation as a School of Law, the Southern University Board of Supervisors re-designated the school as the Southern University Law Center. The building that houses the law center is named A.A. Lenoir Hall after its first dean.

From 1972 to 1974, the law school dean was Louis Berry, a civil rights attorney originally from Alexandria, Louisiana.

Today, the law school is one of only two public law schools in the state.

== Accreditation ==
The Law Center program is accredited by the American Bar Association (ABA) and the Commission on Colleges of the Southern Association of Colleges and Schools. It is approved also by the Veterans Administration for the training of eligible veterans.

== Admissions ==
The Southern University Law Center 2025 first year class had an admission rate of 56.6% with 43.1 % of admitted students enrolling, enrolled students having an average LSAT score of 147 and average GPA of 3.15.

== Bar examination passage ==
In July 2025, the Louisiana bar examination passage rate for the law school’s first-time examination takers was 75%. The Ultimate Bar Pass Rate, which the ABA defines as the passage rate for graduates who sat for bar examinations within two years of graduating, was 76% for the class of 2022.

== Academic and clinical programs ==
A study-abroad program is offered in London, in which students take courses with international subject matter. SULC publishes two legal journals: its traditional Southern University Law Review and The Journal of Race, Gender and Poverty.

At Southern University Law Center, clinical education is available to second and third-year students but not required.

- Administrative/Civil Law Clinic
- Criminal Law Clinic
- Domestic Violence Clinic
- Elder Law Clinic
- Juvenile Law Clinic
- Low-income Taxpayer Clinic
- Mediation Clinic
- Technology and Entrepreneurship Clinic

== Employment ==
According to SULC's official ABA-required disclosures, 46% of the Class of 2019 obtained full-time, long-term, bar passage-required employment (i.e., as attorneys) ten months after graduation, excluding solo-practitioners.

ABA Employment Summary for 2024 Graduates
Employment Status	Percentage
Employed - Bar Passage Required	46.4%
Employed - J.D. Advantage	13.8%
Employed - Professional Position	9.2%
Employed - Other Position	3.8%
Employed - Law School/University Funded	0.4%
Employed - Undeterminable	0.0%
Pursuing Graduate Degree Full Time	0.8%
Employed - Start Date Deferred	0.0%
Unemployed - Not Seeking	1.9%
Unemployed - Seeking	23%
Employment Status Unknown	0.8%
Total of 261 Graduates

== Recognition ==
- In 2025, National Jurist included Southern University Law Center in its Best Law Schools for Practical Training rankings, assigning the school an A− grade for experiential legal education.
- In 2024, National Jurist recognized Southern University Law Center as a top law school for racial justice, assigning the school an A grade.
- In 2019, PreLaw Magazine ranked Southern University Law Center second nationally among law schools for African American students, based on data from the American Bar Association and participating institutions.The publication reported that African Americans comprised more than half of the Law Center’s student body at the time.
- In 2019, Southern University Law Center, in partnership with Penn State Law, was selected as a winner of the Wolters Kluwer Legal & Regulatory Leading Edge Prize for Educational Innovation.
- SULC has the ranking #178-196 in 2024 Best Law Schools by U.S. News & World Report.

== Notable alumni ==
- Alysson Foti Bourque -- author of children's book.
- Shana M. Broussard -- commissioner on the Federal Election Commission since 2020; served as chair in 2021
- Jeff Cox -- judge of the 26th Judicial District in Bossier and Webster parishes since 2005
- Cleo Fields (1987) -- politician, former United States Congressman for Louisiana's 4th Congressional District 1993-1997, former gubernatorial candidate
- Stephanie A. Finley (1991) -- former United States Attorney for Western District of Louisiana
- Mike Foster (2004) -- former Governor of Louisiana
- Randal Gaines -- member of the Louisiana House since 2012 for St. Charles and St. John the Baptist parishes
- Rick Gallot -- tenth president of Grambling State University and Democrat member of both houses of the Louisiana State Legislature: House (2000-2012), Senate (2012-2016)
- Kip Holden (1985) -- mayor of Baton Rouge (2005–2016)
- Marcus Hunter (2005) -- current judge-elect of the Louisiana 4th Judicial District Court. Former member of the Louisiana House of Representatives for District 17 in Ouachita Parish
- Faith Jenkins -- Miss Louisiana 2000, Miss America 2001 first runner-up, attorney, legal analyst, and TV personality
- Edmond Jordan -- member of the Louisiana House of Representatives for District 29 in West and East Baton Rouge parishes since 2016
- Sherman Q. Mack (1999) -- former District 95 Louisiana state representative
- Robert M. Marionneaux (1995) -- Louisiana State representative from District 18 from 1996–2000, Louisiana State Senator from District 17 from 2000 to 2012
- Jonathan W. Perry (1998) -- judge Louisiana Court of Appeal for the Third Circuit
- Meshea Poore -- former member of the West Virginia House of Delegates
- Jesse N. Stone, Jr. (1950) -- Louisiana Supreme Court associate justice pro tempore, chancellor of SULC 1971-72, president of SU System 1975-85, civil rights attorney, and political leader
- Ledricka Thierry (2003) -- politician, member of the Louisiana House of Representatives for St. Landry Parish since 2009
- Rick Ward, III - Louisiana state senator from District 17; native and resident of Iberville Parish
- Alfred C. Williams (1977) -- member of the Louisiana House of Representatives for East Baton Rouge Parish since 2012; Baton Rouge attorney and former school board member
