= Allison Montana =

Mardi Gras Indian Chief of Chiefs

Tootie Montana
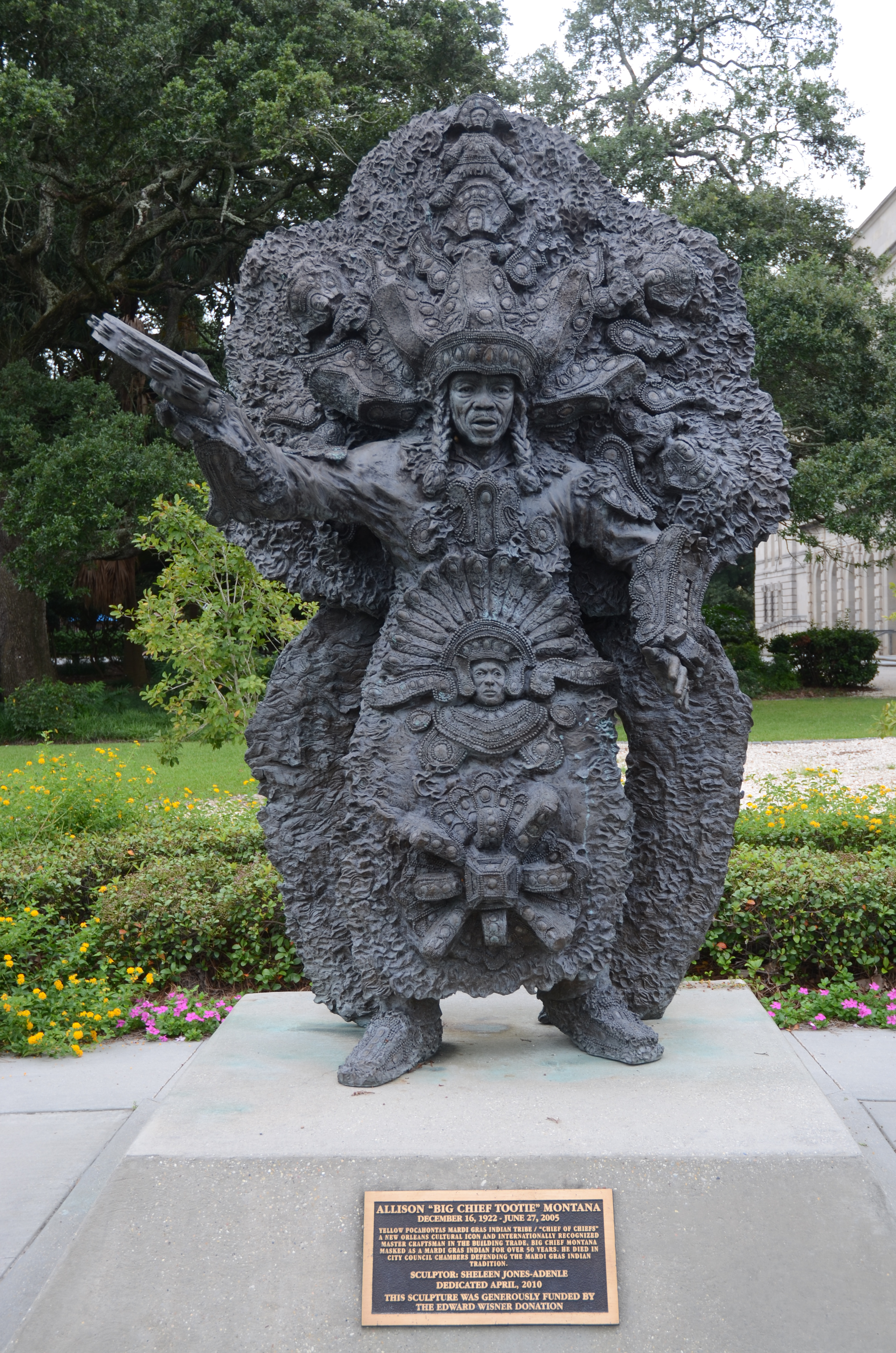
- Statue of Montana in Louis Armstrong Park (New Orleans)
- Born: Allison Montana; December 16, 1922; New Orleans, Louisiana, U.S.
- Died: June 27, 2005 (aged 82); New Orleans, Louisiana
- Other names: Tootie
- Occupation: Lather
- Years active: 1940s–2005
- Known for: Chief of Mardi Gras Indian Chiefs
- Spouse: Joyce Francis
- Awards: National Heritage Fellowship, 1987

Chief Allison "Tootie" Montana (December 16, 1922 – June 27, 2005), a lather by trade, was a New Orleans cultural icon who acted as the Mardi Gras Indian "Chief of Chiefs" for over 50 years. Tootie is revered in the Mardi Gras Indian culture as the Big Chief. Tootie was the Big Chief of the Yellow Pocahontas Tribe and made the culture of the Mardi Gras Indians about pageantry rather than combat display.

== Origins and traditions of Mardi Gras Indians ==
The history of the Mardi Gras Indians can be traced back to the time of slavery in New Orleans. When slaves would escape from the city, many would find shelter with the Indigenous people of America. Traditions of the Mardi Gras Indians stemmed from what was observed while under the care of the indigenous people. The art of masking in Indian suits at Carnival is a way to pay respect to the people who looked after escaped slaves.

Originally, the Mardi Gras Indians were a violent group of people fighting over lands and wards surrounding the parishes. Tribes from different sections of town would engage in fights called humbugs in parts of New Orleans called the battlefield. Carnival was the day that any Indian revenge was executed. An angry Indian would disguise in a dress and blend into the Carnival crowd. The cross-dressing Indian would approach the person they are seeking revenge upon and attack them in the middle of Carnival. The attacker would then escape to change clothes in a local bar. In an interview, Tootie said that all day during Carnival, discarded dresses could be found in bars across New Orleans.

Tootie was outraged by the Mardi Gras Indians' violence, which was disrespecting the culture their ancestors had died for. Many nights after Carnival, Tootie would come home in a battered suit, covered in blood and bruises from the night's events. Tootie spoke out against Indian gang violence and turned to music and dance as a way to express competitive showmanship. In the words of Tootie's widow, Joyce Montana, Tootie was the first to say, “stop fighting with your guns, and begin fighting with your suits and minds".

== Early life ==
Tootie is the great nephew of Becate Batiste, the first creole to mask with the Indians. Becate later went on to form his own Mardi Gras Indian tribe called the Creole Wild West given he was part Indian and part creole. Tootie's father Alfred Montana masked with the Mardi Gras Indians, which provided Tootie with the opportunity to observe the culture. His parents divorced when Tootie was eight years old, but the bond over masking kept Alfred and Tootie close. Alfred helped Tootie mask his first few years going out as a Mardi Gras Indian.

Alfred helped Tootie construct his crown the first 2 years that Tootie masked. His father delivered the crown the night before Carnival. The late arrival pushed Tootie to construct his own crown, to avoid having to suit without one. Before WWII Tootie became known as Big Chief of the Yellow Creole Pocahontas tribe. In 1947, he became Big Chief of The Monogram Hunters, a tribe he founded with local friends. During the time of his work as Big Chief, Tootie changed the nature of masking.

== Chief of Chiefs ==
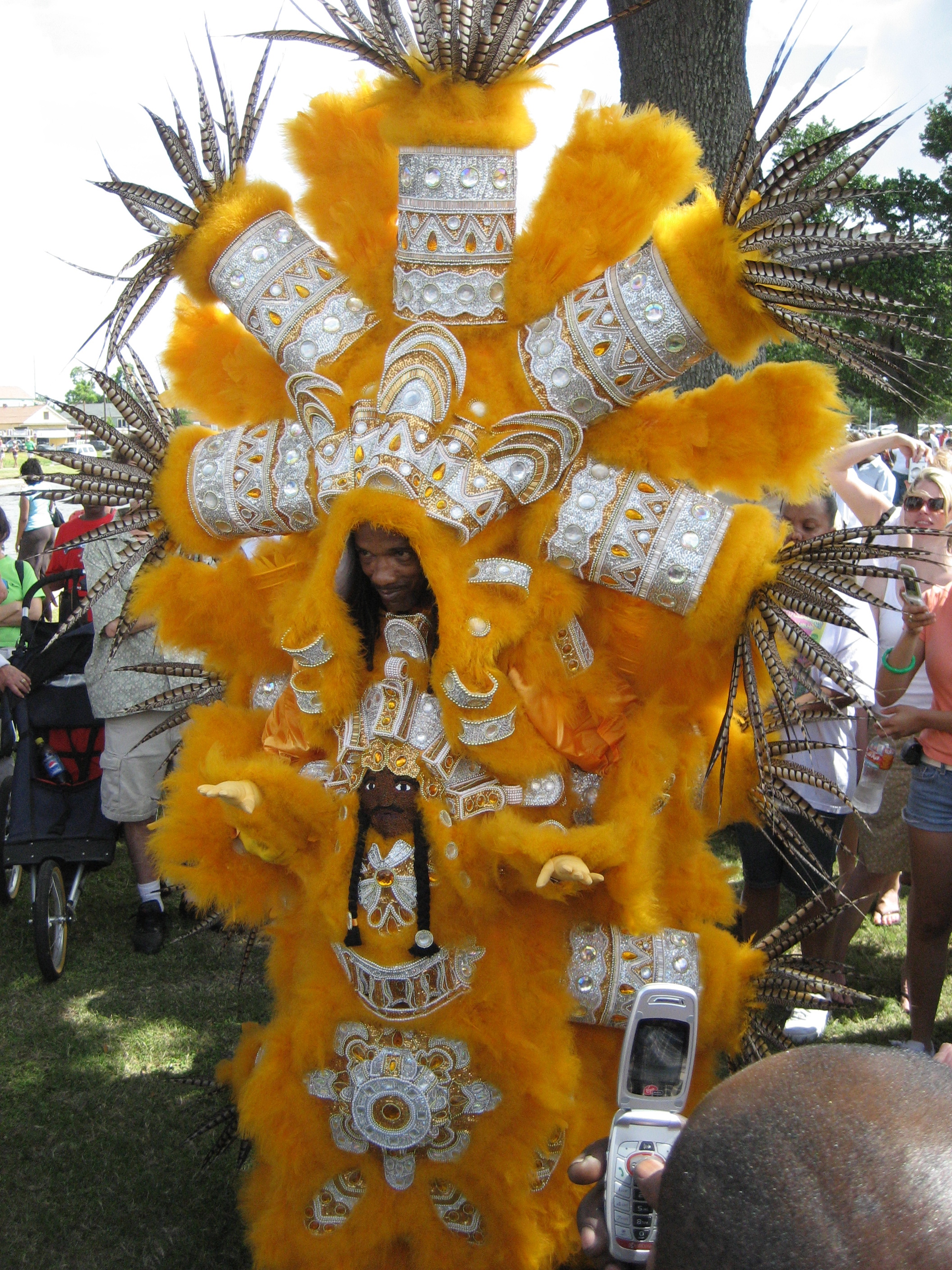
Darryl Montana wearing Indian suit in tribute to his father, 2007

On his climb to becoming the most renowned Chief of the Mardi Gras Indians, Tootie changed the images of the Indian suits from ones of bland colors, to a show of aesthetically pleasing beads, feathers and sequins. Tootie would use vibrant colors and ostrich feathers to display his pride to be a Mardi Gras Indian. He became known for his geometric beadwork. Many Indians looked forward to Tootie unveiling his latest color scheme and patches.

Tootie eventually removed the violent nature of Mardi Gras Indians by replacing it with a competition of beauty, and of love and sightseeing. He believed that if an Indian spent months working on an elaborate suit, they would avoid violent scenes to prevent tarnishing the suit. In the late 1950s, Tootie regained his title of Big Chief for the Yellow Creole Pocahontas tribe.

The start of Carnival involves the Chief marching in the back of his tribe, while non-costumed followers trail behind the Indians, known as a second line. Ahead of the tribe is a "Spyboy" who is a block or two ahead. He will motion to the "Flagboy" if the road ahead is clear or not. The "Flagboy" will then alert the chief. The chief will then make the decision as to what road to take. Because of the ambiguous nature of the Indians, there is no telling what path they make take around New Orleans. This makes finding their exact location difficult to pinpoint each year. When two tribes meet each other on the same path, they will have a battle. This battle no longer involves bloodshed and weapons, but chanting and dancing, as well as an informal competition as to which chief has the "prettiest" suit. The chants are in a native language, and can tell a story, shared experience or taunt the opposing tribe. The relationships between the tribes have become calm since the work that Tootie did with changing the traditions of the Mardi Gras Indians.

In 1982 Tootie is quoted to have said that "Now, people run to the Mardi Gras Indians; back in the day, people would run from them". Montana is a recipient of a 1987 National Heritage Fellowship awarded by the National Endowment for the Arts, which is the United States government's highest honor in the folk and traditional arts. Tootie continued to mask as Chief until 1998, when his son Darryl took over as Chief of The Yellow Pocahontas Tribe. At the age of 78, Tootie was the oldest continuously masking Mardi Gras Indian. In 1995 he stated, "I am the oldest, I am the best, and I am the prettiest". There was one year during his career starting in 1947 and ending in 2005 that he did not mask, and that was for Mardi Gras of 1986.

== Later life and death ==
After handing down the Yellow Pocahontas Tribe to his son, Tootie continued to work on suits and would mask during Carnival until he was 82 years old, totaling 52 years of masking. He wasn't able to walk as easily and had a cart pull him with his tribe. He continued to make beautiful suits in bright colors that would draw the crowds out on Super Sunday. On March 19, 2005 the Mardi Gras Indians were faced with police brutality on Saint Joseph's Day night, a night when the Mardi Gras Indians parade. The police blocked off the road that the Indians were using and began to scatter the masses and fire into crowds.

Tootie had been dealing with this brutality since he began suiting in the 1940s. On June 27, 2005 Tootie was making a speech at the New Orleans City Council Chamber against the NOPD abuse of the Mardi Gras Indians. In the middle of his speech Tootie suffered from a heart attack that took his life. At his funeral, different tribes from across the city gathered to sing, dance and honor Tootie, the Big Creole Chief, the Chief of Chiefs.

== Personal life ==
For most of his adult life, Montana worked as a lather, building wood or metal frames for plaster structures. He was a parishioner of St. Augustine Church in the Tremé neighborhood of New Orleans.

In 1956, Montana married Joyce Francis, who never masked with the Mardi Gras Indians, but who did help Tootie with his suits over the years.
