= A. P. Tureaud =

American lawyer (1899–1972)

Alexander Pierre Tureaud Sr.
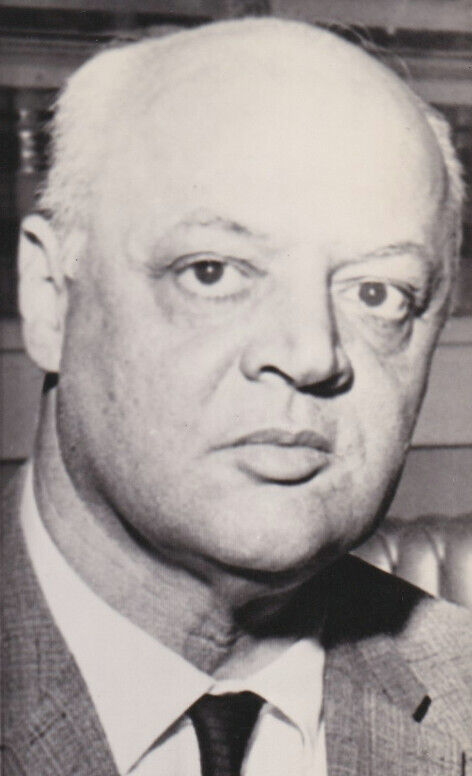
- Tureaud in 1960
- Born: February 26, 1899; New Orleans, Louisiana, U.S.
- Died: January 22, 1972 (aged 72); New Orleans, Louisiana, U.S.
- Education: Howard University
- Occupations: Attorney; Civil rights activist
- Political party: Republican-turned-Democratic (1944)
- Children: A. P. Tureaud Jr.

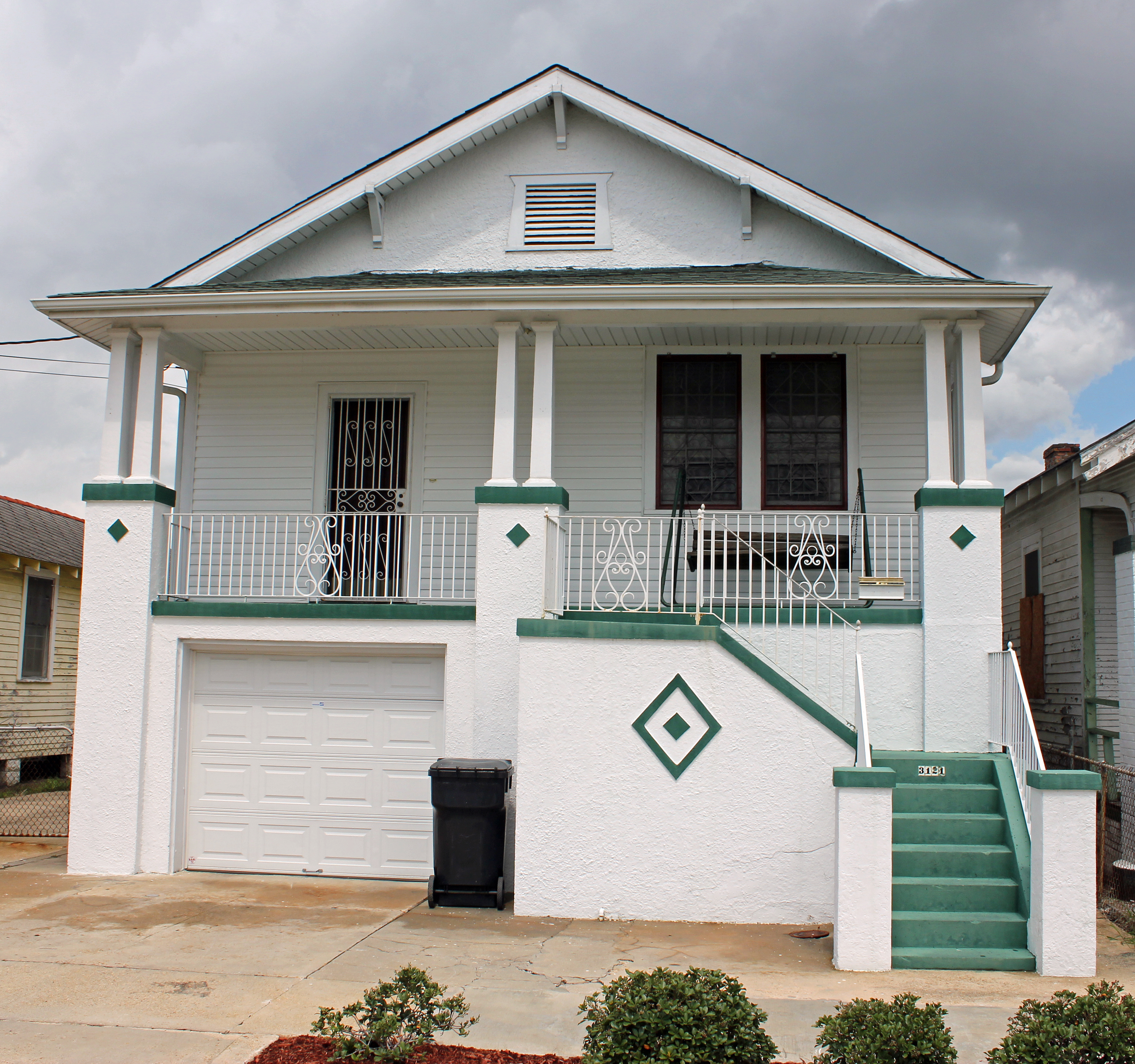
Turead's house at 3121 Pauger Street in New Orleans, where he resided at the time of his death

Alexander Pierre Tureaud Sr. (February 26, 1899 – January 22, 1972) was an American attorney who headed the legal team for the New Orleans chapter of the NAACP during the Civil Rights Movement. With the assistance of Thurgood Marshall and Robert Carter from the NAACP Legal Defense and Educational Fund, A. P. Tureaud filed the lawsuit that successfully ended the system of Jim Crow segregation in New Orleans. That case paved the way for integrating the first two elementary schools in the Deep South.

== Career ==
=== Background ===
Jim Crow laws arose directly from a Supreme Court ruling which validated a "states' rights" notion that blacks and whites could be equally well served using separate but equal public facilities. With Plessy v. Ferguson (163 U.S. 537 (1896)) the United States Supreme Court confirmed the right of state legislatures to enact discriminatory legislation. With this authority, civic organizations throughout the American South moved to restrict citizen access and limit citizens from exercising their civil rights based on the basis of their social and economic status, and on their personal history as descended from a former slave.

Louis Berry, the civil rights attorney from Alexandria and the first African American admitted to the Louisiana bar since Tureaud himself, had hoped to join Tureaud's law firm in the late 1940s, but Tureaud could not at the time afford to take on another attorney.

=== Cases ===
In 1954, the United States Supreme Court overturned Plessy and ruled in Brown v. Board of Education that segregated schools were unconstitutional and must be desegregated "with all deliberate speed." In the following years, A. P. Tureaud and the NAACP initiated the lawsuits which eventually forced the Orleans Parish School System to desegregate. He worked out of an office in the Peter Claver Building, which partly served as a headquarters for the local chapter of the NAACP.

Tureaud also filed suit in 1953 against the Louisiana State University Board of Supervisors seeking desegregation on behalf of his minor son, A. P. Tureaud Jr. As a result, his son became the first black student at LSU.

=== Death ===
Tureaud died in New Orleans in 1972, roughly a month shy of what would have been his 73rd birthday.

== Personal life ==
Tureaud was Catholic, a member of St Augustine Church and the Knights of Peter Claver. A. P. Tureaud Jr. is his son.

== Honors ==
The subject has a statue at the beginning of A.P. Tureaud Street in the 7th ward.
