= A. P. Tureaud Jr. =

African-American speaker, artist, educator, and author

Alexander Pierre Tureaud Jr.
- Born: 1936 (age 89–90); New Orleans, Louisiana
- Education: Louisiana State University (removed); Xavier University of Louisiana; Columbia University (MA)
- Occupations: Speaker; Artist; Educator; Author
- Parent: A. P. Tureaud, Sr.

Alexander Pierre Tureaud Jr. (born c. 1936) is an African-American speaker, artist, educator, and author. He is known for being the first black student at Louisiana State University, entering in 1953 after his father, A. P. Tureaud Sr., sued the school. Tureaud Jr. was removed from school by court order after 55 days.

== Biography ==
Born in 1936, Tureaud Jr was raised in New Orleans' Seventh Ward by his mother and his father, the legendary civil rights attorney A. P. Tureaud Sr., who helped overturn segregation and other laws in Louisiana and nationwide.

When Jr. was 17, his father sued for his right to attend LSU. The lawsuit was initially successful, but the school would soon counter with a courtroom move of their own, having Jr. removed from the school by court order.

After his expulsion from LSU, in 1956 the Supreme Court of the United States ruled that the school erred in that it could not legally deny admission based on race or color. Even so, Tureaud graduated from Xavier University of Louisiana and earned an MA degree at Columbia University. In 1962, he taught at White Plains High School. He would later become an administrator.

He received an honorary degree from LSU 58 years after his expulsion, in 2011. That same year, Tureaud and Rachel L. Emanuel wrote A More Noble Cause: A. P. Tureaud and the Struggle for Civil Rights in Louisiana, A Personal Biography, which covered his father's more than four decades of efforts for civil rights.

== Personal life ==
In 1960, Tureaud married Faye Frances Darensbourg in Baton Rouge, Louisiana at St Francis Xavier Catholic Church. They later resided in Connecticut with their two sons and two grandchildren.
