= Southern University at Shreveport =

Historically black junior college in Louisiana, US

- Seal of Southern University at Shreveport
- Motto: Opportunity Starts Here
- Type: Public, HBCU, Community college
- Established: 1967
- Parent institution: SU System
- Affiliations: SU System
- Chancellor: Dr. Aubra J. Gantt
- Students: 3,014
- Location: Shreveport, Louisiana, United States
- Campus: Suburban
- Colors: Blue and Gold
- Nickname: Jaguars and Lady Jaguars
- Sporting affiliations: NJCAA – Miss-Lou Conference
- Website: www.susla.edu
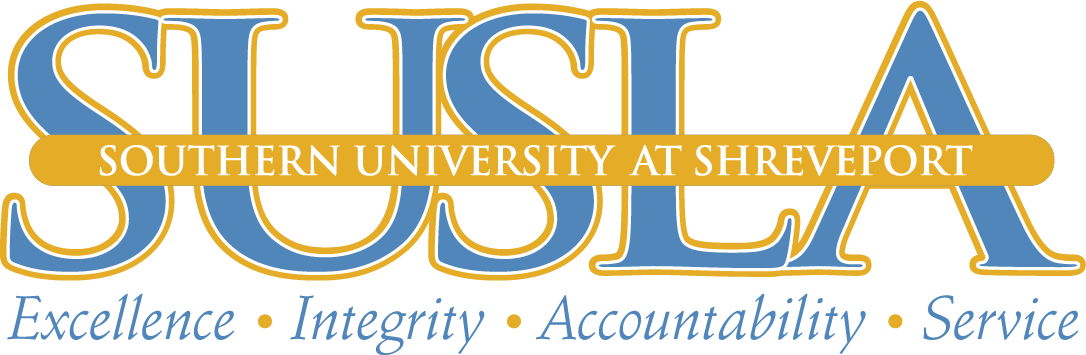

Southern University at Shreveport (SUSLA) is a junior college in Shreveport, Louisiana. It is part of the historically black Southern University System. The college is a member school of Thurgood Marshall College Fund.

== History ==
Southern University at Shreveport was pushed to fruition by the administration of Governor John J. McKeithen and opened for instruction on September 19, 1967. The primary emphasis of SUSLA was to serve the Shreveport-Bossier City metro area. It was part of the historically black Southern University System.

On October 28, 1974, the Louisiana Board of Regents, then the Coordinating Council for Higher Education, granted to the institution approval for six associate degree programs in business, humanities, medical office assistant, natural sciences, office administration, and social sciences. In 1978, it added an associate degree in medical laboratory technology.

SUSLA is accredited by the Southern Association of Colleges and Schools to award associate degrees in various fields of study. The college is a member school of Thurgood Marshall College Fund. The college has 3,014 students. Its current president is Dennis J. Shields.

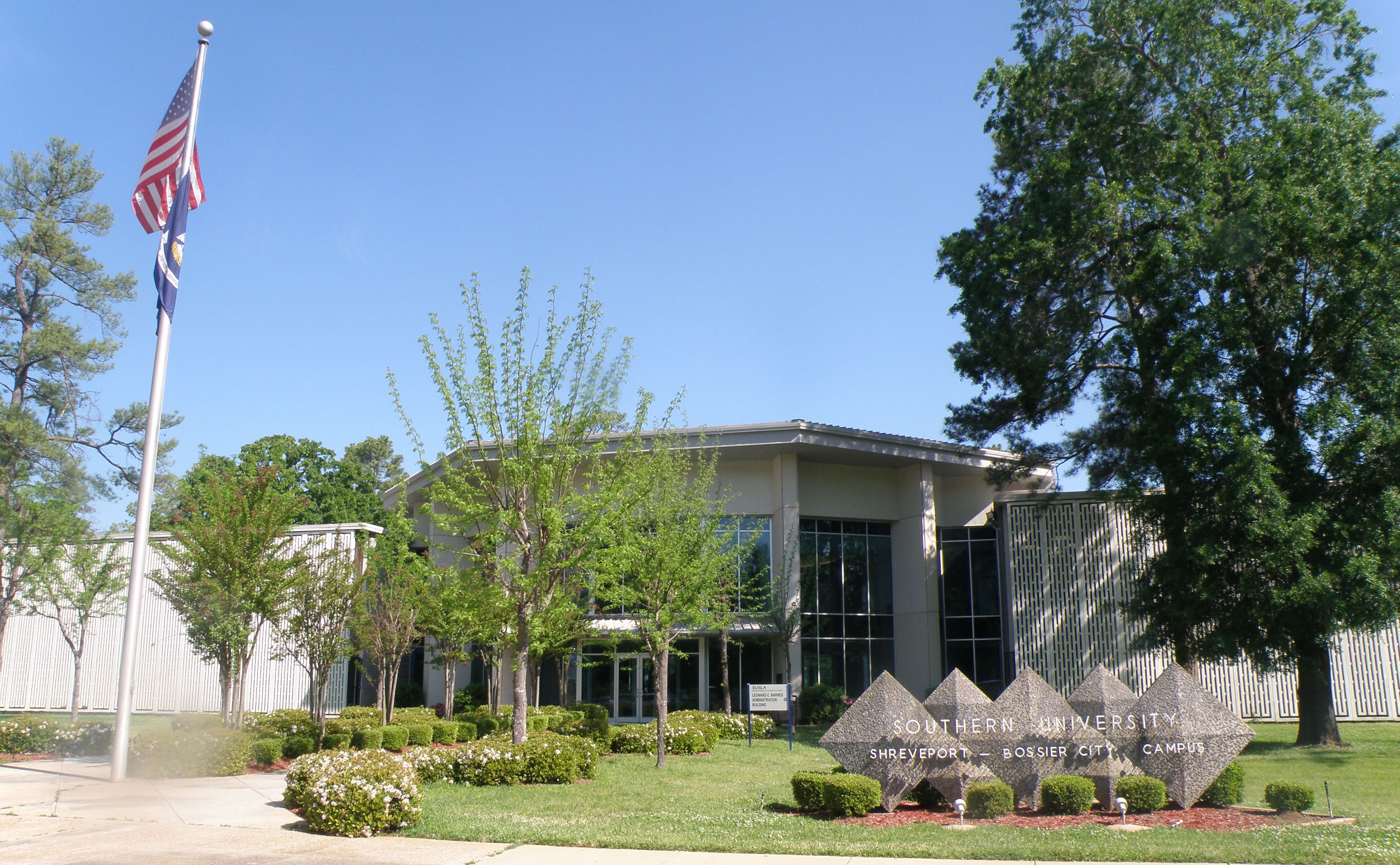
Southern University at Shreveport campus

== Campus ==
SUSLA is located in Shreveport, Louisiana. Among the buildings at SUSLA is Stone Hall, named for the late Southern University System president Jesse N. Stone, Jr. Inside Stone Hall is the J. Bennett Johnston, Jr. Video Conferencing Center, named for the former U.S. senator J. Bennett Johnston from Shreveport.

The Alphonse Jackson building, named for the late State Representative Alphonse Jackson Jr., is a 36,000-square-foot learning facility that opened in 2017. Costing $7.5 million, it was the first new classroom building constructed on campus since the late 1950s. The building houses most of SUSLA's "BSTEM" (Business, Science, Technology, Engineering, and Math) classes and features a 150-seat lecture hall with stadium seating, in addition to conference rooms, meeting spaces, and offices.

SUSLA's Metro Center campus, located at 610 Texas Street in Shreveport, LA, houses a majority of its Allied Health programs. The facility features computer and allied health labs, classrooms, academic and administrative offices, a media production studio, and the Southern University Museum of Art at Shreveport.

SUSLA offers an FAA-certified Airframe and Powerplant Maintenance program at its off-campus Aerospace Technology Center, training students for professional licensure.

For students, SUSLA provides housing at the Jaguar Courtyard, located less than two minutes from the main campus. Residents can choose from two- or four-bedroom floor plans.

== Academics ==
Southern University at Shreveport is accredited by the Southern Association of Colleges and Schools Commission on Colleges (SACSCOC) to award associate degrees, technical diplomas, and certificates. It offers associate degree programs, technical programs, and certificates under the following divisions:

- Allied Health & Nursing
- Arts, Humanities, Social Sciences and Education
- Business, Science, Technology, Engineering and Mathematics

== Student Life ==
The Johnny L. Vance, Jr. Student Activity Center provides programs and services that support students' physical, social, recreational, and educational development. These programs are conducted by the Office of Student Life and its committees, including the Student Government Association (SGA)—a student-elected body of leaders.

The center is dedicated to the memory of Johnny L. Vance Jr., an educator and community leader who began his academic career as a SUSLA student and later returned to serve the university.

== Athletics ==
The college's mascot is the jaguar. Its team colors are blue and gold.

The Port City Jaguars and Lady Jaguars are composed of two athletic teams representing Southern University at Shreveport in intercollegiate athletics, including men's and women's basketball. The Jaguars and Lady Jaguars compete in National Junior College Athletic Association Division I, Region 23. The SUSLA sports teams are members of the Louisiana Community Colleges Athletic Conference.

The Jaguars and Lady Jaguars basketball teams play at the Health and Physical Education Complex.

== See also ==
- List of historically black colleges and universities
