= Jesse N. Stone =

American judge (1924–2001)

Jesse Nealand Stone Jr.
- Born: June 17, 1924; Gibsland, Bienville Parish; Louisiana, USA
- Died: May 14, 2001 (aged 76); Shreveport; Caddo Parish, Louisiana
- Education: Southern University; Southern University Law Center
- Occupations: Attorney; Educator; University system president
- Political party: Democratic
- Spouse: Willa Dean Anderson Stone
- Children: Shonda Deann Stone

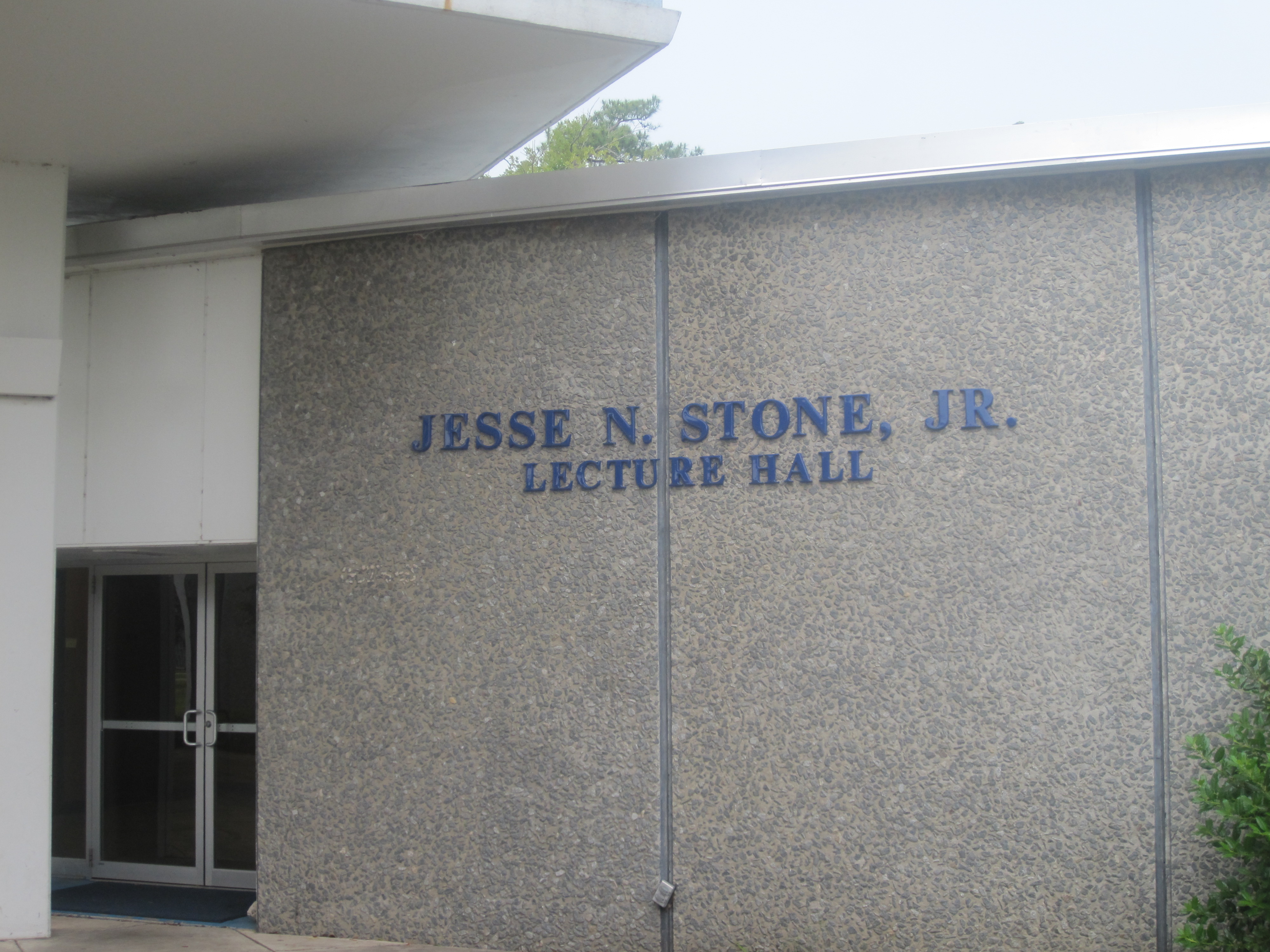
Jesse N. Stone Jr., Lecture Hall at Southern University at Shreveport

Jesse Nealand Stone Jr. (June 17, 1924 – May 14, 2001), was an African-American attorney from Louisiana who was appointed associate pro tempore of the Louisiana Supreme Court.

== See also ==
- List of African-American jurists
