= Index of Louisiana-related articles =

The location of the state of Louisiana in the United States of America

The following is an alphabetical list of articles related to the U.S. state of Louisiana.

== 0–9 ==
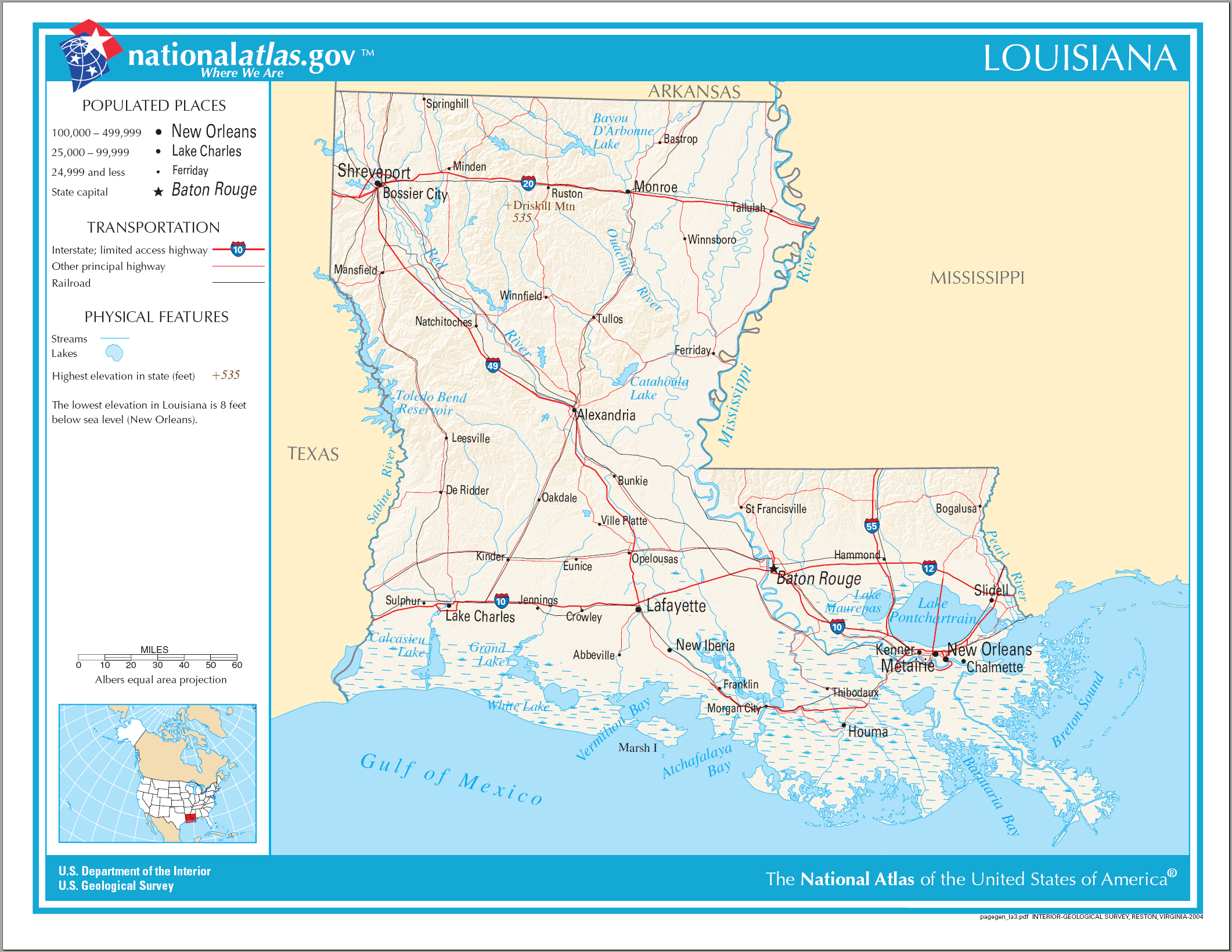
An enlargeable map of the state of Louisiana

- .la.us – Internet second-level domain for the state of Louisiana

== A ==
- Abortion in Louisiana
- Adams-Onís Treaty of 1819
- Adjacent states:
  - State of Arkansas
  - State of Mississippi
  - State of Texas
- Agriculture in Louisiana
- Airports in Louisiana
- Amusement parks in Louisiana
- Aquaria in Louisiana
  - commons:Category:Aquaria in Louisiana
- Arboreta in Louisiana
  - commons:Category:Arboreta in Louisiana
- Archaeology of Louisiana
  - Category:Archaeological sites in Louisiana
    - commons:Category:Archaeological sites in Louisiana
- Architecture of Louisiana
- Art museums and galleries in Louisiana
  - commons:Category:Art museums and galleries in Louisiana
- Astronomical observatories in Louisiana
  - commons:Category:Astronomical observatories in Louisiana
- Attorney General of the State of Louisiana

== B ==
- Baton Rouge, Louisiana, state capital 1849-1862 and since 1880
- Pierre Belly
- Black Belt
- Botanical gardens in Louisiana
  - commons:Category:Botanical gardens in Louisiana
- Bryan v. Kennett
- Buildings and structures in Louisiana
  - commons:Category:Buildings and structures in Louisiana

== C ==
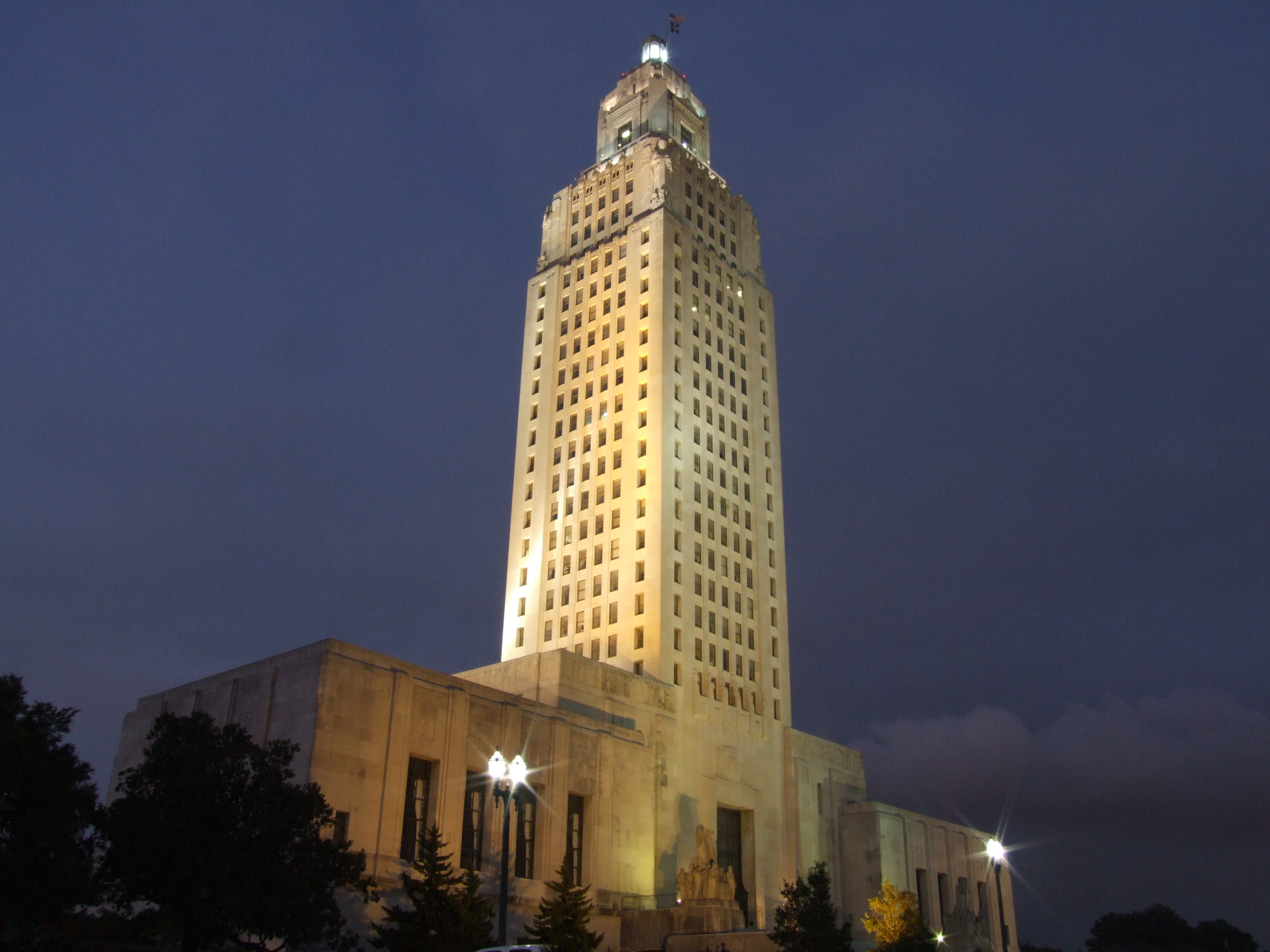
The Louisiana State Capitol in Baton Rouge

- Capital of the State of Louisiana
- Capitol of the State of Louisiana
  - commons:Category:Louisiana State Capitol
- Casinos in Louisiana
- Census-designated places in Louisiana
- Census statistical areas of Louisiana
- Cities in Louisiana
  - commons:Category:Cities in Louisiana
- Climate of Louisiana
- Climate change in Louisiana
- Colleges and universities in Louisiana
  - commons:Category:Universities and colleges in Louisiana
- Communications in Louisiana
  - commons:Category:Communications in Louisiana
- Companies in Louisiana
- Constitution of the State of Louisiana
- Convention centers in Louisiana
  - commons:Category:Convention centers in Louisiana
- Cuisine of Louisiana
  - commons:Category:Louisiana cuisine
- Culture of Louisiana
  - Category:Culture of Louisiana
    - commons:Category:Louisiana culture

== D ==
- Dave Robicheaux
- Demographics of Louisiana
- Donaldsonville, Louisiana, state capital 1830-1831

== E ==
- Economy of Louisiana
  - Category:Economy of Louisiana
    - commons:Category:Economy of Louisiana
- Education in Louisiana
  - Category:Education in Louisiana
    - commons:Category:Education in Louisiana
- Elections in Louisiana
  - Category:Elections in Louisiana
    - commons:Category:Elections in Louisiana
- Environment of Louisiana
  - commons:Category:Environment of Louisiana
- État de Louisiane

== F ==
- Fauna of Louisiana
- Festivals in Louisiana
  - Category:Festivals in Louisiana
    - commons:Category:Festivals in Louisiana
- Flag of the state of Louisiana
- la Florida, (1565–1702)
- Forts in Louisiana
  - Category:Forts in Louisiana
    - commons:Category:Forts in Louisiana

== G ==
- Geography of Louisiana
  - Category:Geography of Louisiana
    - commons:Category:Geography of Louisiana
- Ghost towns in Louisiana
  - Category:Ghost towns in Louisiana
    - commons:Category:Ghost towns in Louisiana
- Government of the state of Louisiana website
  - Category:Government of Louisiana
    - commons:Category:Government of Louisiana
- Governor of the state of Louisiana
  - List of governors of Louisiana
- Great Seal of the State of Louisiana

== H ==
- High schools of Louisiana
- Higher education in Louisiana
- Highway routes in Louisiana
- Hiking trails in Louisiana
  - commons:Category:Hiking trails in Louisiana
- History of Louisiana
  - Indigenous peoples
  - Spanish colony of la Florida, 1565–1763
    - Treaty of Paris of 1763
  - French colony of la Louisiane, 1699–1764
    - History of slavery in Louisiana, 1706–1865
    - Treaty of Fontainebleau of 1762
  - British Colony of West Florida, 1763–1783
    - Treaty of Paris of 1783
  - Spanish (though predominantly Francophone) district of Baja Louisiana, 1764–1803
    - Rebellion of 1768
    - Third Treaty of San Ildefonso of 1800
  - Spanish colony of Florida Occidental, 1783–1821
    - Republic of West Florida, 1810
  - French district of la Basse-Louisiane, 1803
    - Louisiana Purchase of 1803
  - Unorganized territory of the United States, 1803–1804
  - U.S. Territory of Orleans, 1804–1812
    - Sabine Free State, 1806–1821
    - U.S. unilaterally annexes Florida Parishes, 1810
  - State of Louisiana, since 1812
    - War of 1812, 1812–1815
      - Battle of New Orleans, 1815
    - Adams-Onis Treaty of 1819
    - Louisiana in the American Civil War, 1861–1865
      - Confederate States of America, 1861–1865
    - Louisiana in Reconstruction, 1865–1868
  - Category:History of Louisiana
    - commons:Category:History of Louisiana
- Hospitals in Louisiana
- House of Representatives of the State of Louisiana
- Hurricane Katrina

== I ==
- Images of Louisiana
  - commons:Category:Louisiana
- Islands of Louisiana

== L ==
- LA – United States Postal Service postal code for the state of Louisiana
- Lakes of Louisiana
  - commons:Category:Lakes of Louisiana
- Landmarks in Louisiana
  - commons:Category:Landmarks in Louisiana
- Languages of Louisiana
- Laws of the state of Louisiana
- Lieutenant Governor of the State of Louisiana
- Lists related to the state of Louisiana:
  - List of airports in Louisiana
  - List of census statistical areas in Louisiana
  - List of cities in Louisiana
  - List of colleges and universities in Louisiana
  - List of festivals in Louisiana
  - List of fire lookout towers in Louisiana
  - List of forts in Louisiana
  - List of fossiliferous stratigraphic units in Louisiana
  - List of ghost towns in Louisiana
  - List of governors of Louisiana
  - List of high schools in Louisiana
  - List of highway routes in Louisiana
  - List of hospitals in Louisiana
  - List of individuals executed in Louisiana
  - List of islands of Louisiana
  - List of law enforcement agencies in Louisiana
  - List of museums in Louisiana
  - List of National Historic Landmarks in Louisiana
  - List of Native American mounds in Louisiana
  - List of newspapers in Louisiana
  - List of parishes in Louisiana
  - List of people from Louisiana
  - List of plantations in Louisiana
  - List of radio stations in Louisiana
  - List of railroads in Louisiana
  - List of Registered Historic Places in Louisiana
  - List of rivers of Louisiana
  - List of salt domes in Louisiana
  - List of school districts in Louisiana
  - List of sports teams in Louisiana
  - List of state forests in Louisiana
  - List of state parks in Louisiana
  - List of state prisons in Louisiana
  - List of sugar mills and refineries in Louisiana
  - List of symbols of the state of Louisiana
  - List of television stations in Louisiana
  - List of towns in Louisiana
  - List of Louisiana's congressional delegations
  - List of United States congressional districts in Louisiana
  - List of United States representatives from Louisiana
  - List of United States senators from Louisiana
- Los Adaes, capital of the Spanish colony of Tejas
- Louisiana website
  - Category:Louisiana
    - commons:Category:Louisiana
      - commons:Category:Maps of Louisiana
  - Louisiana Purchase of 1803
- Louisiana State Capitol
- la Louisiane, 1702–1763

== M ==
- Maps of Louisiana
  - commons:Category:Maps of Louisiana
- Mass media in Louisiana
- Mississippi River
- Monuments and memorials in Louisiana
  - commons:Category:Monuments and memorials in Louisiana
- Mountains of Louisiana
  - commons:Category:Mountains of Louisiana
- Museums in Louisiana
  - Category:Museums in Louisiana
    - commons:Category:Museums in Louisiana
- Music of Louisiana
  - Category:Music of Louisiana
    - commons:Category:Music of Louisiana
  - Category:Musical groups from Louisiana
  - Category:Musicians from Louisiana

== N ==
- National forests of Louisiana
  - commons:Category:National Forests of Louisiana
- Natural history of Louisiana
  - commons:Category:Natural history of Louisiana
- New Orleans, capital of Territory of Orleans 1803–1812, capital of State of Louisiana 1812–1830, 1831–1849, and 1865–1880
  - previously as Nueva Orleans, capital of Baja Louisiana 1763-1800
  - previously as la Nouvelle-Orléans, capital of la Louisiane 1722–1763, capital of la Basse-Louisiane 1800-1803
- Newspapers of Louisiana

== O ==
- Opelousas, Louisiana, state capital 1862-1863

== P ==
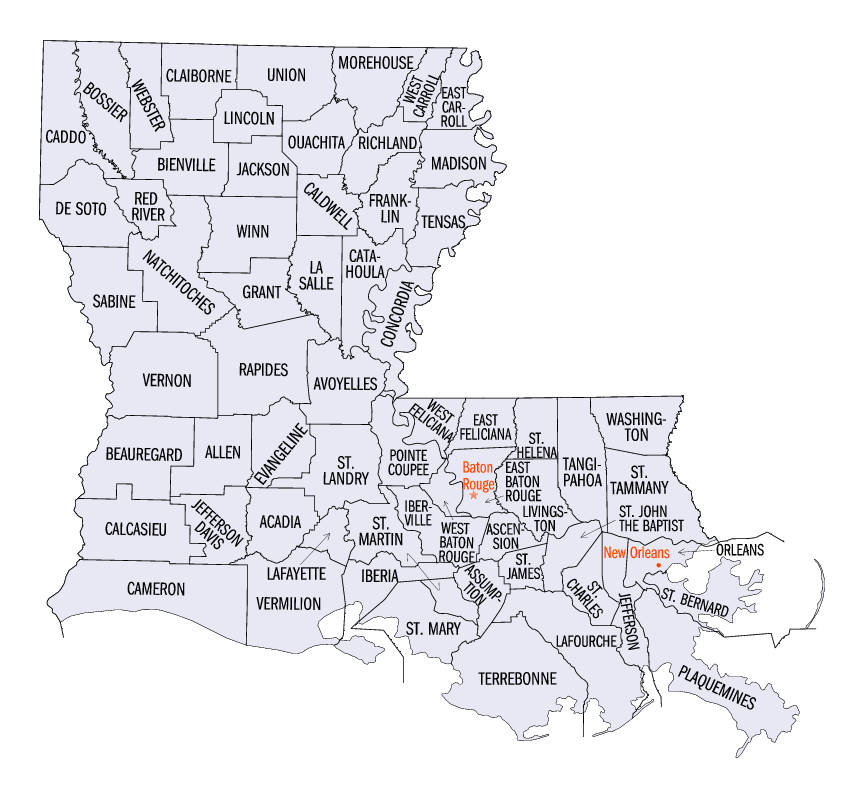
An enlargeable map of the 64 parishes of the state of Louisiana

- Paleontology in Louisiana
- Parishes of the state of Louisiana
  - commons:Category:Parishes in Louisiana
- People from Louisiana
  - Category:People from Louisiana
    - commons:Category:People from Louisiana
    - Category:People from Louisiana by populated place
    - Category:People by parish in Louisiana
    - Category:People from Louisiana by occupation
- Politics of Louisiana
  - Category:Politics of Louisiana
    - commons:Category:Politics of Louisiana
- Portal:Louisiana
- Protected areas of Louisiana
  - commons:Category:Protected areas of Louisiana

== R ==
- Radio stations in Louisiana
- Railroads in Louisiana
- Registered historic places in Louisiana
  - commons:Category:Registered Historic Places in Louisiana
- Religion in Louisiana
  - Category:Religion in Louisiana
    - commons:Category:Religion in Louisiana
- Rivers of Louisiana
  - commons:Category:Rivers of Louisiana
- Roller coasters in Louisiana
  - commons:Category:Roller coasters in Louisiana

== S ==
- Sabine-Southwestern War
- School districts of Louisiana
- Scouting in Louisiana
- Senate of the State of Louisiana
- Settlements in Louisiana
  - Cities in Louisiana
  - Towns in Louisiana
  - Villages in Louisiana
  - Census Designated Places in Louisiana
  - Other unincorporated communities in Louisiana
  - List of ghost towns in Louisiana
- Shreveport, Louisiana, state capital 1863-1865
- Sports in Louisiana
  - List of sports teams in Louisiana
  - Category:Sports in Louisiana
    - commons:Category:Sports in Louisiana
  - Category:Sports venues in Louisiana
    - commons:Category:Sports venues in Louisiana
- State Capitol of Louisiana
- State of Louisiana website
  - Constitution of the State of Louisiana
  - Government of the State of Louisiana
    - Category:Government of Louisiana
      - commons:Category:Government of Louisiana
  - Executive branch of the government of the State of Louisiana
    - Governor of the State of Louisiana
  - Legislative branch of the government of the State of Louisiana
    - Legislature of the State of Louisiana
      - Senate of the State of Louisiana
      - House of Representatives of the State of Louisiana
  - Judicial branch of the government of the State of Louisiana
    - Supreme Court of the State of Louisiana
- State parks of Louisiana
  - commons:Category:State parks of Louisiana
- State prisons of Louisiana
- Structures in Louisiana
  - commons:Category:Buildings and structures in Louisiana
- Superfund sites in Louisiana
- Supreme Court of the State of Louisiana
- Symbols of the State of Louisiana
  - Category:Symbols of Louisiana
    - commons:Category:Symbols of Louisiana

== T ==
- Telecommunications in Louisiana
  - commons:Category:Communications in Louisiana
- Telephone area codes in Louisiana
- Television shows set in Louisiana
- Television stations in Louisiana
- Territory of Louisiana
- Theatres in Louisiana
  - commons:Category:Theatres in Louisiana
- Tourism in Louisiana website
  - commons:Category:Tourism in Louisiana
- Towns in Louisiana
  - commons:Category:Cities in Louisiana
- Transportation in Louisiana
  - Category:Transportation in Louisiana
    - commons:Category:Transport in Louisiana

== U ==
- Unincorporated communities in Louisiana
- United States of America
  - States of the United States of America
  - United States census statistical areas of Louisiana
  - Louisiana's congressional delegations
  - United States congressional districts in Louisiana
  - United States Court of Appeals for the Fifth Circuit
  - United States District Court for the Eastern District of Louisiana
  - United States District Court for the Middle District of Louisiana
  - United States District Court for the Western District of Louisiana
  - United States representatives from Louisiana
  - United States senators from Louisiana
- Universities and colleges in Louisiana
  - commons:Category:Universities and colleges in Louisiana
- US-LA – ISO 3166-2:US region code for the State of Louisiana

== V ==
- Villages in Louisiana

== W ==
- Wikimedia
  - Wikimedia Commons:Category:Louisiana
    - commons:Category:Maps of Louisiana
  - Wikinews:Category:Louisiana
    - Wikinews:Portal:Louisiana
  - Wikipedia Category:Louisiana
    - Wikipedia Portal:Louisiana
    - Wikipedia:WikiProject Louisiana
      - Category:WikiProject Louisiana articles
      - Category:WikiProject Louisiana participants

== Z ==
- Zoos in Louisiana
  - commons:Category:Zoos in Louisiana

== See also ==
- Topic overview:
  - Louisiana
  - Outline of Louisiana
