= Louisiana Community and Technical College System =

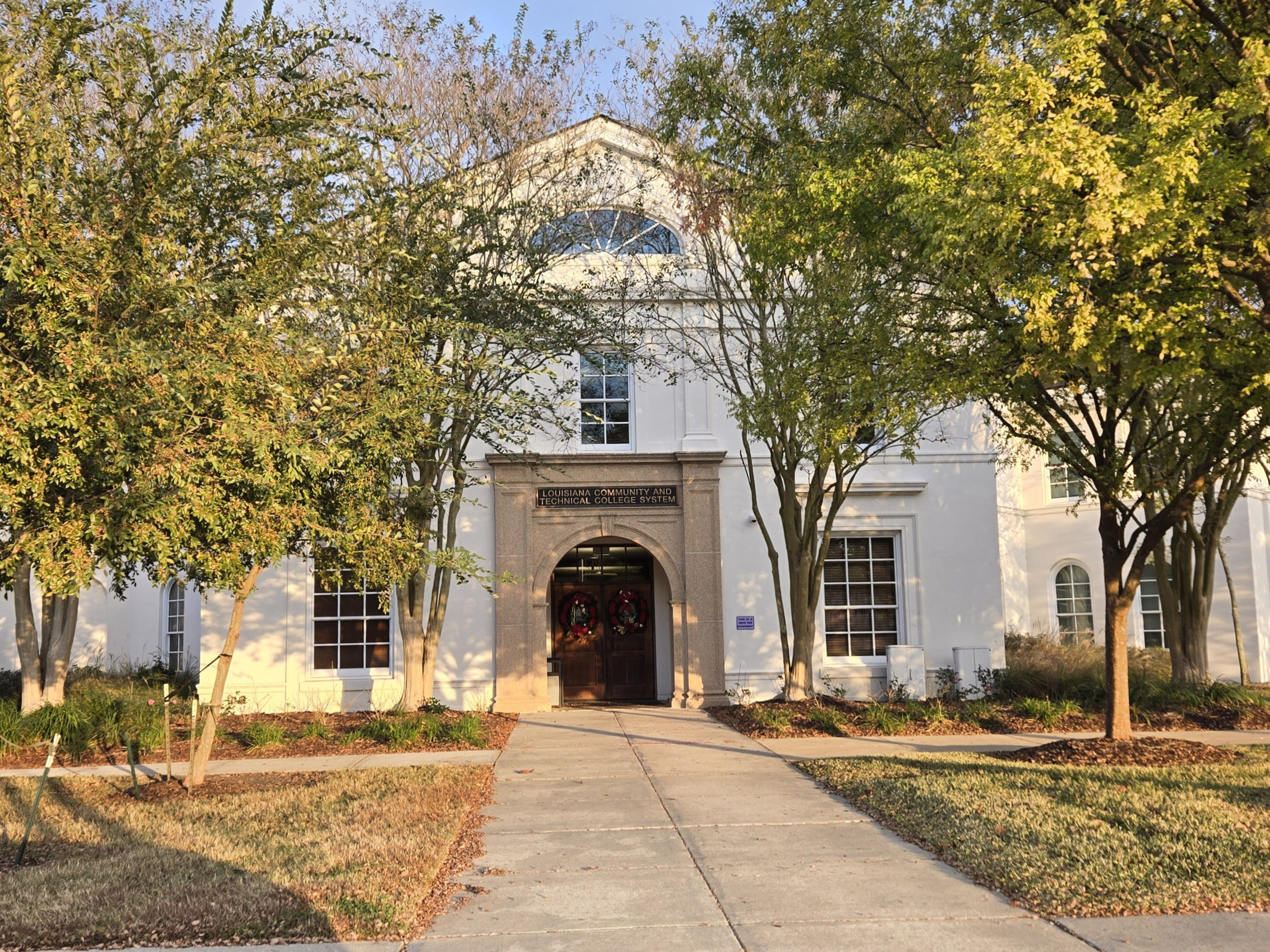
Louisiana Community and Technical College System (LCTCS) Headquarters, Baton Rouge

The Louisiana Community and Technical College System (LCTCS) manages thirteen public 2-year institutions in the state of Louisiana. It is headquartered in Baton Rouge, and is located on the campus of Baton Rouge Community College. The chair of the Board of Supervisors is Vincent St. Blanc III, and the President is Dr. Joe D. May.

== Colleges ==
Louisiana Community and Technical College System
Name	Established	Enrollment	Parishes served
Baton Rouge Community College	1995	9,088	East Baton Rouge; East Feliciana; Livingston; St. Helena; West Baton Rouge; West Feliciana
Bossier Parish Community College	1967	6,306	Bossier; Caddo; De Soto; Natchitoches; Red River; Sabine; Webster
Central Louisiana Technical Community College	2005	1,208	Allen; Avoyelles; Catahoula; Concordia; Grant; La Salle; Rapides; Vernon; Winn
Delgado Community College	1921	11,865	Jefferson; Orleans; St. Charles; St. John the Baptist; St. Tammany
Fletcher Technical Community College	1948	1,965	Iberia; Lafourche; St. Martin; St. Mary; Terrebonne
Louisiana Delta Community College	2001	4,063	Caldwell; East Carroll; Franklin; Jackson; Lincoln; Madison; Morehouse; Ouachita; Richland; Tensas; Union; West Carroll
Northshore Technical Community College	2010	5,053	Livingston; St. Helena; St. Tammany; Tangipahoa; Washington
Northwest Louisiana Technical Community College	1952	928	Bienville; Bossier; Caddo; Claiborne; De Soto; Natchitoches; Red River; Sabine; Webster
Nunez Community College	1992	2,320	Plaquemines; St. Bernard
River Parishes Community College	1999	2,341	Ascension; Assumption; Iberville; St. Charles; St. James; St. John the Baptist
South Louisiana Community College	1997	5,088	Acadia; Evangeline; Iberia; Iberville; Lafayette; Pointe Coupee; St. Landry; St. Martin; Vermillion
Sowela Technical Community College	1938	3,205	Allen; Beauregard; Calcasieu; Cameron; Jefferson Davis

== See also ==
- List of colleges and universities in Louisiana
- List of hospitals in Louisiana
