= Joe May (disambiguation) =

Joe May (1880–1954) was an Austrian-American film director and film producer.

Joe May may also refer to:

- Joe T. May (born 1937), American electrical engineer and politician from Virginia
- Joseph May (born 1974), British-born Canadian actor
- Joseph May (politician) (1816–1890), New Zealand politician
- Brother Joe May (1912–1972), American gospel singer
- Joe D. May, educator and leader in the post-secondary college and technical school field

== See also ==
- Joe Mays (disambiguation)
