= List of colleges and universities in Louisiana =

The following is a list of colleges and universities in the U.S. state of Louisiana.

== Colleges, universities, and professional schools ==
=== Public colleges and universities ===
==== Louisiana State University System ====
- Louisiana State University - Baton Rouge
- Louisiana State University at Eunice^{†} - Eunice
- Louisiana State University of Alexandria - Alexandria
- Louisiana State University Shreveport - Shreveport
- LSU Health Sciences Center New Orleans - New Orleans
- LSU Health Sciences Center Shreveport - Shreveport
- LSU New Orleans - New Orleans

==== Southern University System ====
- Southern University - Baton Rouge
- Southern University at New Orleans - New Orleans
- Southern University at Shreveport^{†} - Shreveport

==== University of Louisiana System ====
- Grambling State University - Grambling
- Louisiana Tech University - Ruston
- McNeese State University - Lake Charles
- Nicholls State University - Thibodaux
- Northwestern State University - Natchitoches
- Southeastern Louisiana University - Hammond
- University of Louisiana at Lafayette - Lafayette
- University of Louisiana at Monroe - Monroe

==== Louisiana Community and Technical College System ====
- Baton Rouge Community College - Baton Rouge
- Bossier Parish Community College - Bossier City
- Central Louisiana Technical Community College - Alexandria
- Delgado Community College - New Orleans
- Fletcher Technical Community College - Schriever
- Louisiana Delta Community College - Monroe
- Northshore Technical Community College - Lacombe
- Northwest Louisiana Technical Community College - Minden
- Nunez Community College - Chalmette
- River Parishes Community College - Gonzales
- South Louisiana Community College - Lafayette
- SOWELA Technical Community College - Lake Charles

^{† two-year colleges, not named "community college"}

=== Private research university (non-sectarian) ===
- Tulane University - New Orleans

=== Private colleges and universities ===
- Centenary College of Louisiana^{*} - Shreveport
- Dillard University^{*} - New Orleans
- Franciscan Missionaries of Our Lady University - Baton Rouge
- Louisiana Christian University^{*} - Pineville
- Loyola University New Orleans - New Orleans
- University of Holy Cross ^{*} - New Orleans
- Xavier University of Louisiana - New Orleans

^{* liberal arts colleges}

=== For-profit colleges ===
- Blue Cliff College - Alexandria, Lafayette, and Metairie
- Chamberlain University - Jefferson
- Delta College of Arts & Technology - Baton Rouge
- Fortis College - Baton Rouge
- ITI Technical College - Baton Rouge

=== Religious seminaries ===
- Louisiana Baptist University and Theological Seminary - Shreveport
- New Orleans Baptist Theological Seminary - New Orleans
- Notre Dame Seminary - New Orleans
- Saint Joseph Seminary College - Covington

== Closed or relocated institutions ==
=== Former public technical colleges ===
- Louisiana Technical College, 42 statewide campuses, 1930–2012 — merged and are now aligned to other institutions within the Louisiana Community and Technical College System
- South Central Louisiana Technical College, 4 campuses — merged 2018 into South Louisiana, Fletcher, and River Parishes Community Colleges

=== Former private colleges and universities ===
- Dodd College, Shreveport, 1927–1942 — closed
- H. Sophie Newcomb Memorial College, New Orleans, 1886–2006 — merged within Tulane University
- Jefferson College, Convent, 1800s — closed. Campus currently a Jesuit retreat house.
- Leland College, New Orleans, Baker, 1870–1960 — closed
- Mount Lebanon University, Mount Lebanon, 1860–1906 — closed, replaced by Louisiana Baptists with Louisiana College
- St. Charles College, Grand Coteau, 1837–1922 — closed. Campus currently a Jesuit scholasticate, retreat center, and retirement home.
- St. Mary's Dominican College, New Orleans, 1860–1984 — closed
- Straight University, New Orleans, 1868–1934 — merged to form Dillard University

=== Former for-profit colleges ===
- Columbus University — relocated to Mississippi and possibly closed as a diploma mill
- ITT Technical Institute — closed September 2016
- Virginia College 1983-2018 — closed

== See also ==
- List of college athletic programs in Louisiana
- University of Louisiana
- Southern Association of Colleges and Schools
- List of unaccredited institutions of higher education
- Louisiana Board of Regents
- Higher education in the United States
- Lists of American institutions of higher education
- List of recognized higher education accreditation organizations
