= Joe Mays =

Joe Mays may refer to:

- Joe Mays (pitcher) (born 1975), former Major League Baseball right-handed pitcher
- Joe Mays (catcher) (1914–1986), American Negro league catcher
- Joe Mays (American football) (born 1985), former American football linebacker

== See also ==
- Joe May (disambiguation)
