= Rebuilding America's Middle Class: A Coalition of Community Colleges =

Rebuilding America's Middle Class (RAMC) is a non-profit member-supported coalition composed of state-wide community college systems, districts, and individual institutions.

The group aims to rebuild America’s middle class by enhancing student success and by promoting the vital role of community colleges. RAMC is specifically focused on providing a strong national voice for community colleges; communicating and demonstrating the vital role community colleges play in spurring economic development in local communities; and educating policy makers on how to develop and implement laws that will best support America's community colleges.

The current members of RAMC are: Dallas County Community College District, Kentucky Community and Technical College System, Des Moines Area Community College, Virginia Community College System, Wisconsin Technical College System, Metropolitan Community College (Nebraska), Lone Star College System, Ivy Tech Community College of Indiana, and Louisiana Community and Technical College System.
