= Fauna of Louisiana =

State ecology

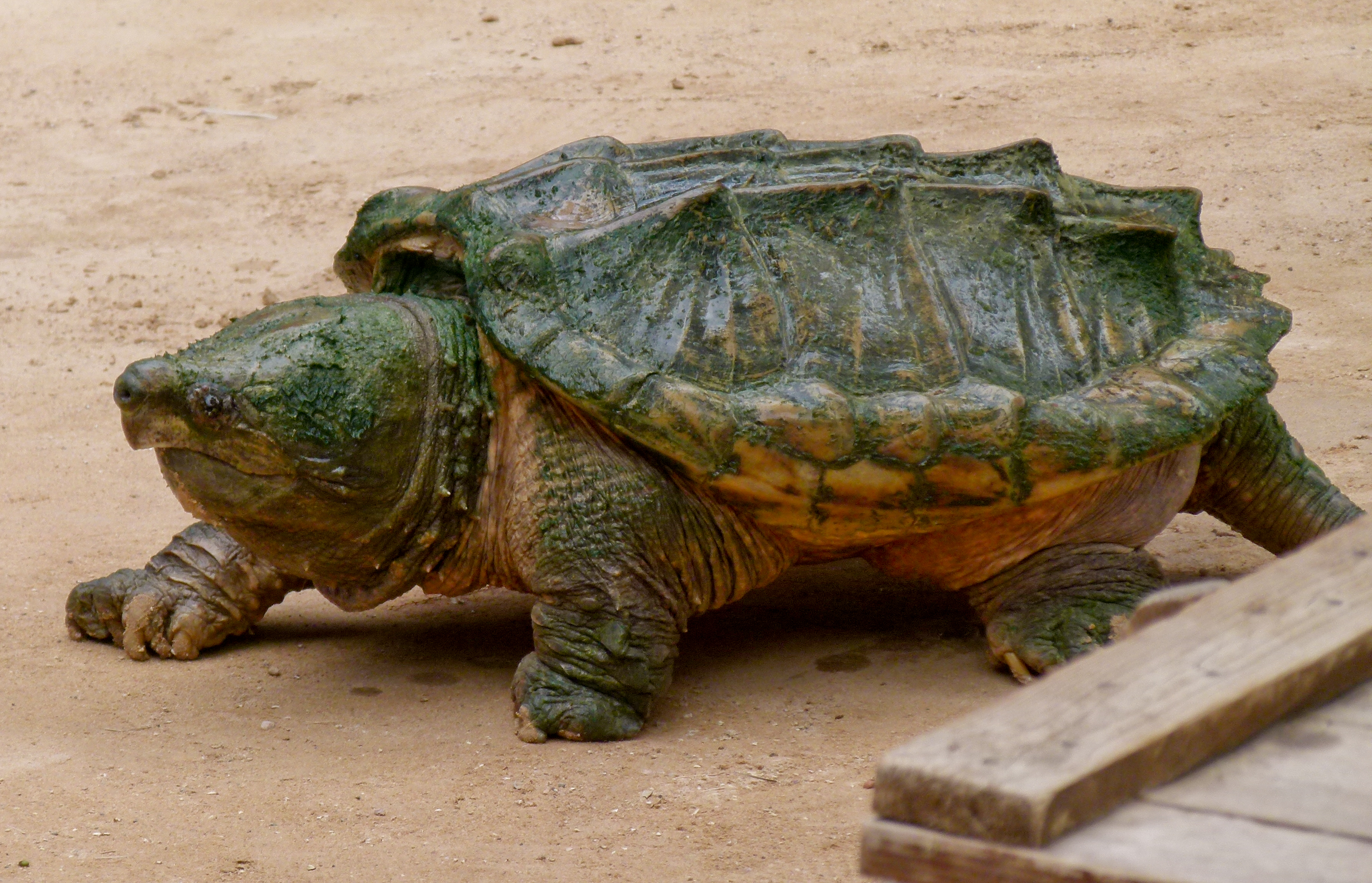
The alligator snapping turtle lives throughout all of the state; Louisiana and neighboring states Arkansas and Mississippi are the only U.S. states where alligator turtles are found throughout the entire state.

The fauna of Louisiana is characterized by the region's low swamplands, bayous, creeks, woodlands, coastal marshlands and beaches, and barrier islands covering an estimated 20,000 square miles (52,000 square kilometers), corresponding to 40 percent of Louisiana's total land area. Southern Louisiana contains up to fifty percent of the wetlands found in the Continental United States, made up of countless bayous and creeks.

The Creole State has a humid subtropical climate, perhaps the best example of a humid subtropical climate of all the Southern United States with long, humid and hot summers and short, mild winters. The subtropical characteristics of the state are due in large part to the influence of the Gulf of Mexico, which at its farthest point is no more than 200 miles (320 kilometers) away. Louisiana's varied habitats — tidal marshes, bayous, swamps, woodlands, islands, forests, and prairies — offer a diversity of wildlife.

Some of the most common animals found throughout all of the parishes include otter, deer, mink, muskrat, raccoons, opossums, rabbits, squirrels, nutria, turtles, alligators, woodcocks, skunks, foxes, beavers, ringtails, armadillos, coyotes and bobcats. Deer, squirrel, rabbit, and bear are hunted as game, while muskrat, snakes, nutria, mink, opossum, bobcat, and skunk are commercially significant for fur. Prized game birds include quail, turkey, woodcock, and various waterfowl, of which the mottled duck and wood duck are native. There are several endemic plants and animals in Louisiana that are found nowhere else on Earth; an example could be the Louisiana bluestar or the white leucistic alligator. The Pearl River map turtle and the ringed map turtle are only found in Louisiana and neighboring State of Mississippi.

Louisiana contains a number of areas which are, in varying degrees, protected from human intervention. In addition to National Park Service sites and areas and the Kisatchie National Forest, Louisiana operates a system of state parks, state historic sites, one state preservation area, one state forest, and many Wildlife Management Areas. The Nature Conservancy also owns and manages a set of natural areas.

== State ecology ==
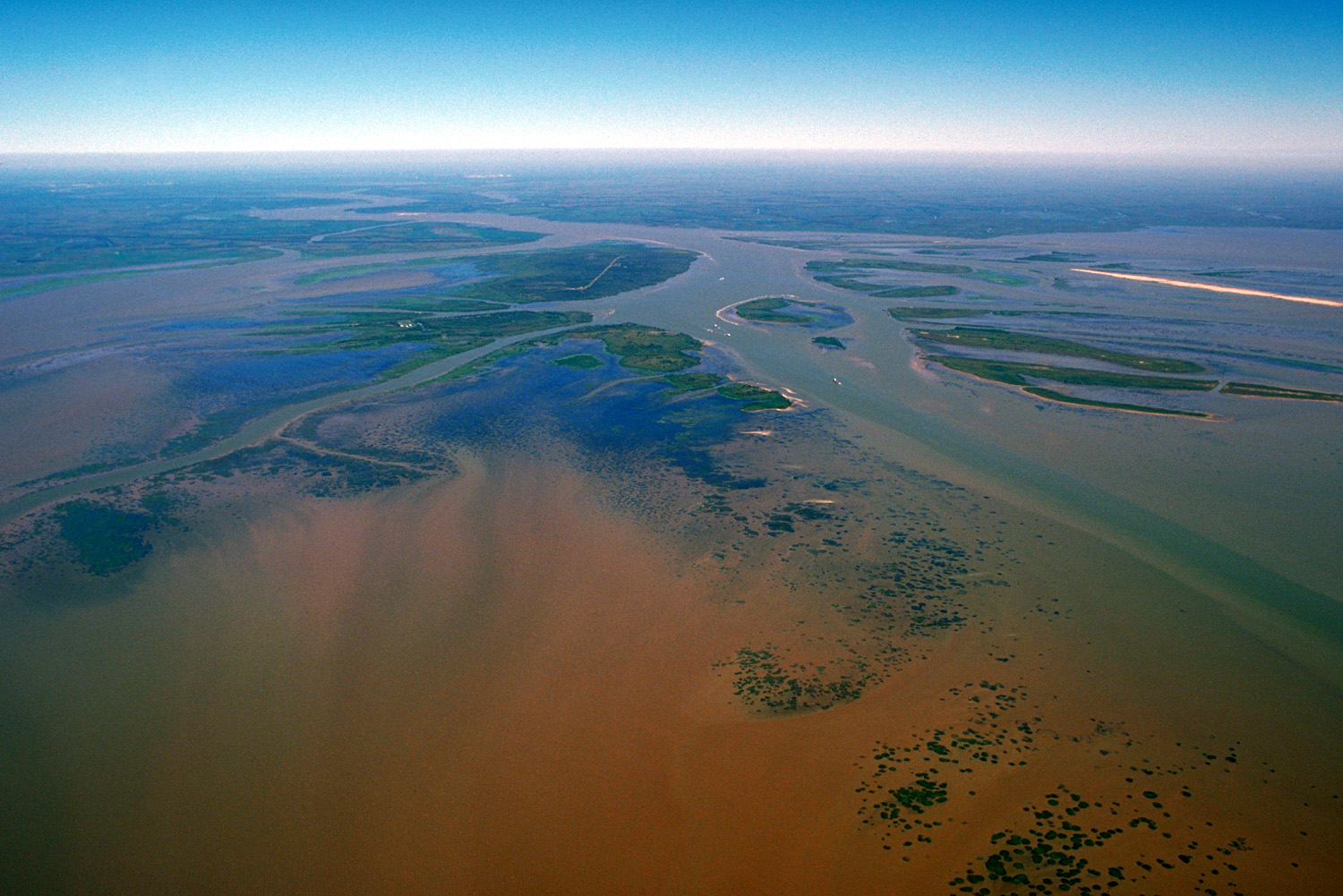
An aerial view of the Atchafalaya Swamp, the largest swamp in the U.S.

Much of the state's lands were formed from sediment washed down the Mississippi River, leaving enormous deltas and vast areas of coastal marsh and swamp. The northern parts of Louisiana mostly consist of woodlands which are home to deer, squirrels, rabbits, bears, muskrats, mink, opossums, bobcats, and skunks. Louisiana's forests offer a mix of oak, pine, beech, black walnut, and cypress trees. In the Piney Woods in the Ark-La-Tex-region, mammals such as the North American cougar, gray fox, feral hogs (razorback), and snakes such as the western cottonmouth, the western worm snake, the Louisiana pine snake, as well as other animals are common.

Louisiana's largest forest, the Kisatchie National Forest in the forested hills of Central Louisiana, has 155 species of breeding birds, 48 mammal species, 56 reptile species and 30 amphibian species. It is some 600,000 acres (240,000 hectares) in area, more than half of which is vital flatwoods vegetation, which supports many rare plant and animal species. These include for instance the Louisiana pine snake, the red-cockaded woodpecker, the Louisiana black bear and the Louisiana pearlshell.

Alligators are common in Louisiana's extensive swamps, bogs, creeks, lakes, rivers, wetlands, and bayous. Other water-loving reptiles such as the alligator snapping turtle live in the Louisiana swamps. The alligator snapping turtle is characterized by a very large head and three rows of spiked scutes. These wetlands of Louisiana make ideal homes for several species of turtles, crawfish and catfish – all of which are popular Acadian foods.

Among invasive species that thrive in the wetlands of Louisiana is the nutria, a South American rodent that was likely introduced when individual animals escaped from fur farms.

== Mammals ==
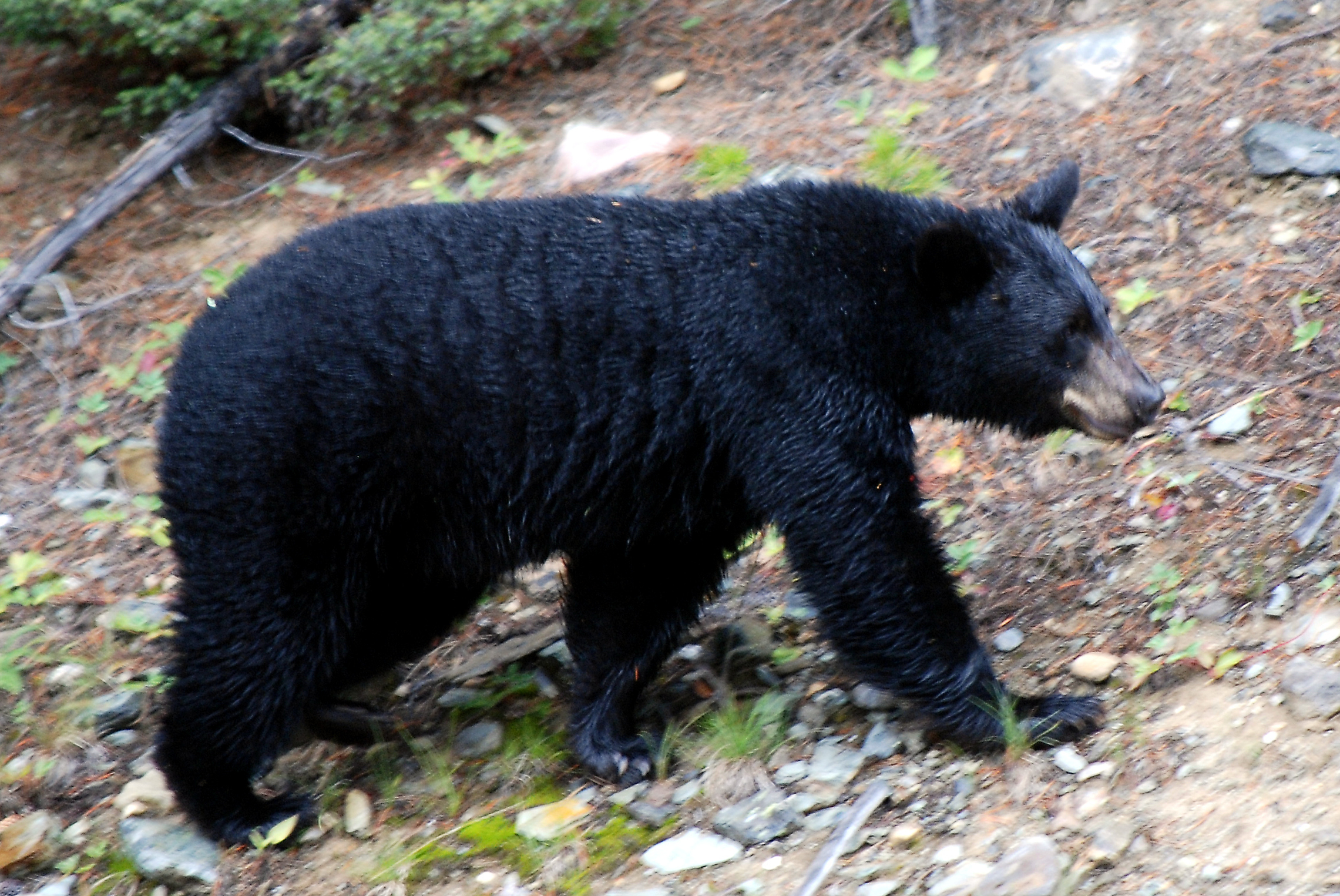
The Louisiana black bear was designated the Official State Animal in 1992.

Forty species of mammals reside in Louisiana, excluding marine mammals. Seventy mammal species have been recorded in Louisiana or its immediate adjacent waters. Louisiana has, for instance, two species of squirrels: eastern gray squirrels and fox squirrels, according to the Louisiana Department of Wildlife and Fisheries.

Louisiana has two species of rabbits: eastern cottontails and swamp rabbits. Although the cottontail is considered more of an upland species and the swamp rabbit a wetland species, both species occur throughout the state. Rabbits have high productivity rates in Louisiana when habitat and weather conditions are good.

=== Louisiana black bear ===
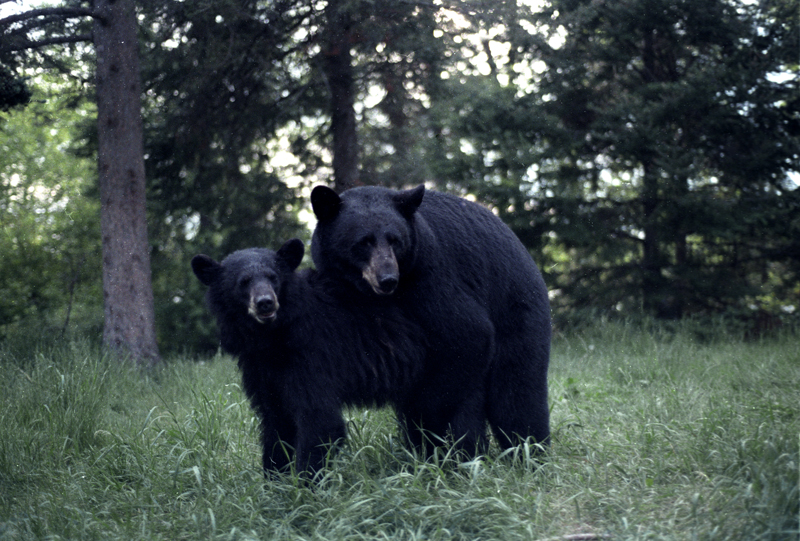
The Louisiana black bear (Ursus americanus luteolus) is one of sixteen currently recognized subspecies of American black bear.

The Louisiana black bear once ranged throughout the State of Louisiana and parts of adjacent neighboring Mississippi, Arkansas, and Texas. The black bear was common at the time of early colonization, serving as food for Native Americans for generations.

An 1890 record shows 17 parishes containing bears, all of them by the Mississippi-border and the Atchafalaya region. It was reported that the most extensive areas of bottomland hardwoods in the state have "at least a few bears", with the greatest number found in the denser woodlands along the Tensas, Red, Black, and Atchafalaya Rivers. In the late 1950s, bears occupied habitat in the Tensas-Madison area in northeast Louisiana and in the lower fringes of the Atchafalaya Basin.

Today, black bears can be found in all of Louisiana, but according to the Louisiana Department of Wildlife and Fisheries, most black bears are observed in a confined region made up of the following parishes: West- and East Carroll, Richland, Franklin, Madison, Tensas, Catahoula, Concordia, Avoyelles, Pointe Coupee, St. Landry, Vermilion, Iberia, as well as both St. Martin and St. Mary.

Black bear could be legally hunted in parts of Louisiana through the late 1980s. One of the last organized bear hunts in Louisiana occurred December 15, 1955. During this hunt, five bears were harvested in the Lake Providence area. It was recommended to the Wildlife Commission that the bear season be closed. Bear hunting was closed the following season and remained closed until 1961. The season was opened again from 1962 to 1965 with hunting permitted only in northeast Louisiana and in the coastal parishes. The hunting season was again closed from 1966 to 1974. It was reopened in 1975–1987 with hunting restricted to the Atchafalaya Basin.

The Louisiana bear hunting season has remained closed since 1988. From 1964 through 1967, 161 black bears were live-trapped in Cook County, Minnesota and released in the Mississippi and Atchafalaya River bottoms of Louisiana in an effort to restock black bear to the state. By 1968 there was evidence that the translocated bears were reproducing. However, most of the relocated bears were killed on roads, as nuisance animals, or during recapture.

As of 2016, Louisiana black bears are no longer considered endangered by the Endangered Species Act.

== Reptiles ==
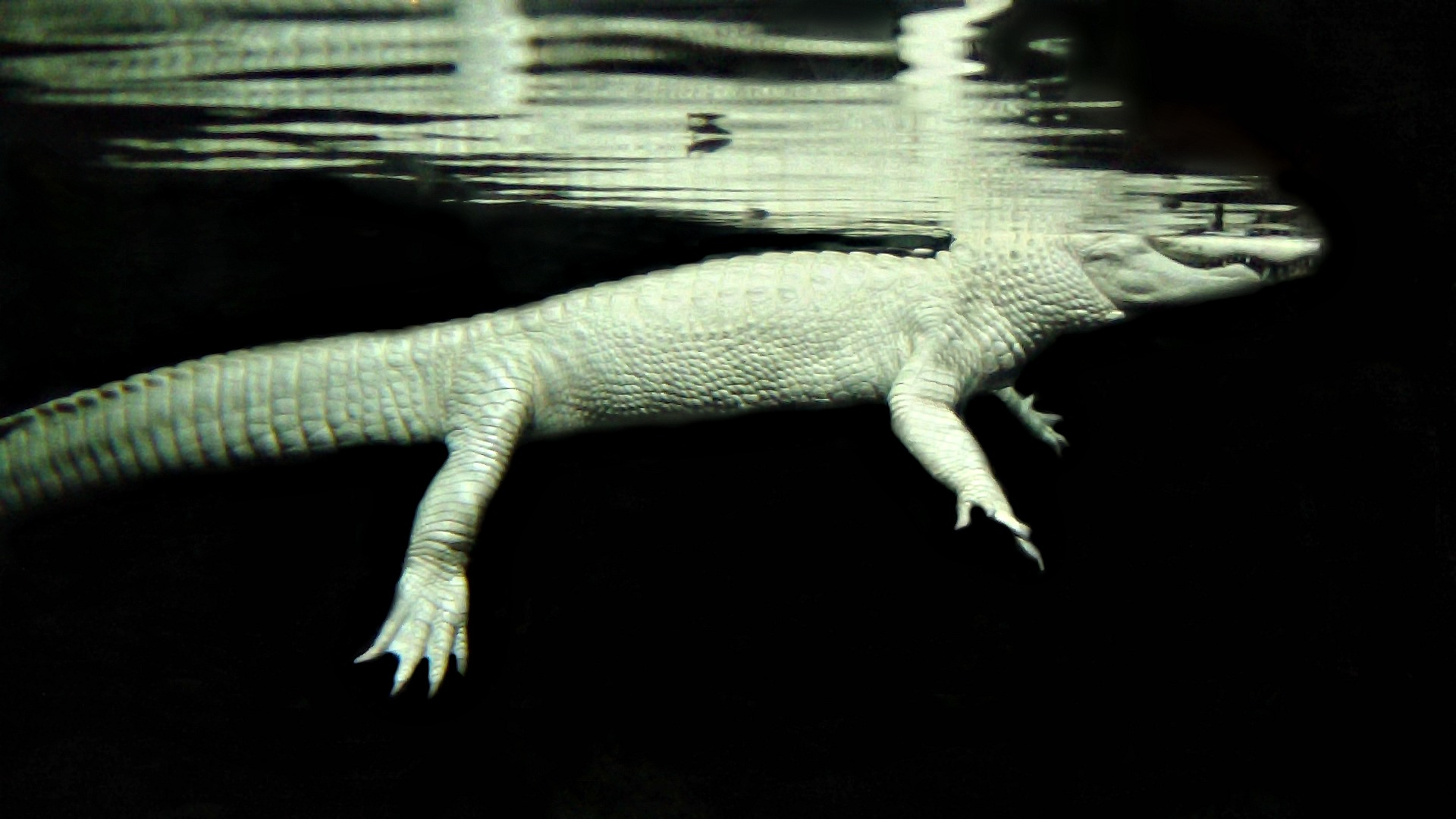
Wild leucistic alligators are only found in Louisiana.

The American alligator is the official state reptile of Louisiana. Perhaps the most iconic of Louisiana wetlands' animals, the American alligator has bounced back from near extinction to being relatively commonplace. An abundance of snake species make their home in Louisiana, including the eastern diamondback rattlesnake, Texas coral snake, eastern yellowbelly racer, mud snake, western pigmy rattlesnake, northern scarlet snake, rainbow snake, buttermilk racer, tan racer, northern cottonmouth, red cornsnake, pit vipers and kingsnake.

America's largest freshwater turtle, the alligator snapping turtle, shares the habitat with its cousin, the common snapping turtle. The green American chameleon also lives in the wetlands, along with the lizard-like tiger salamander, which is an amphibian. Other examples of reptiles in Louisiana are the gopher tortoise, razor-backed musk turtle, broad-headed skink, coal skink and the slender glass lizard.

According to the Louisiana Alligator Council, there are over one million alligators in the state in 2014 and the number is continuously increasing. Alligators like swamps, rivers, lakes or wherever they can have an adequate habitat. Louisiana has several varieties of venomous snakes. The eastern coral snake, Texas coral snake, eastern copperhead, cottonmouth, western pygmy rattlesnake, and the eastern diamondback rattlesnake and canebrake rattlesnake can all be found in Louisiana.

The largest reported American alligator was a male killed in 1890 on Marsh Island in Louisiana, and reportedly measured at 19 feet (5.8 meters).

== Birds ==
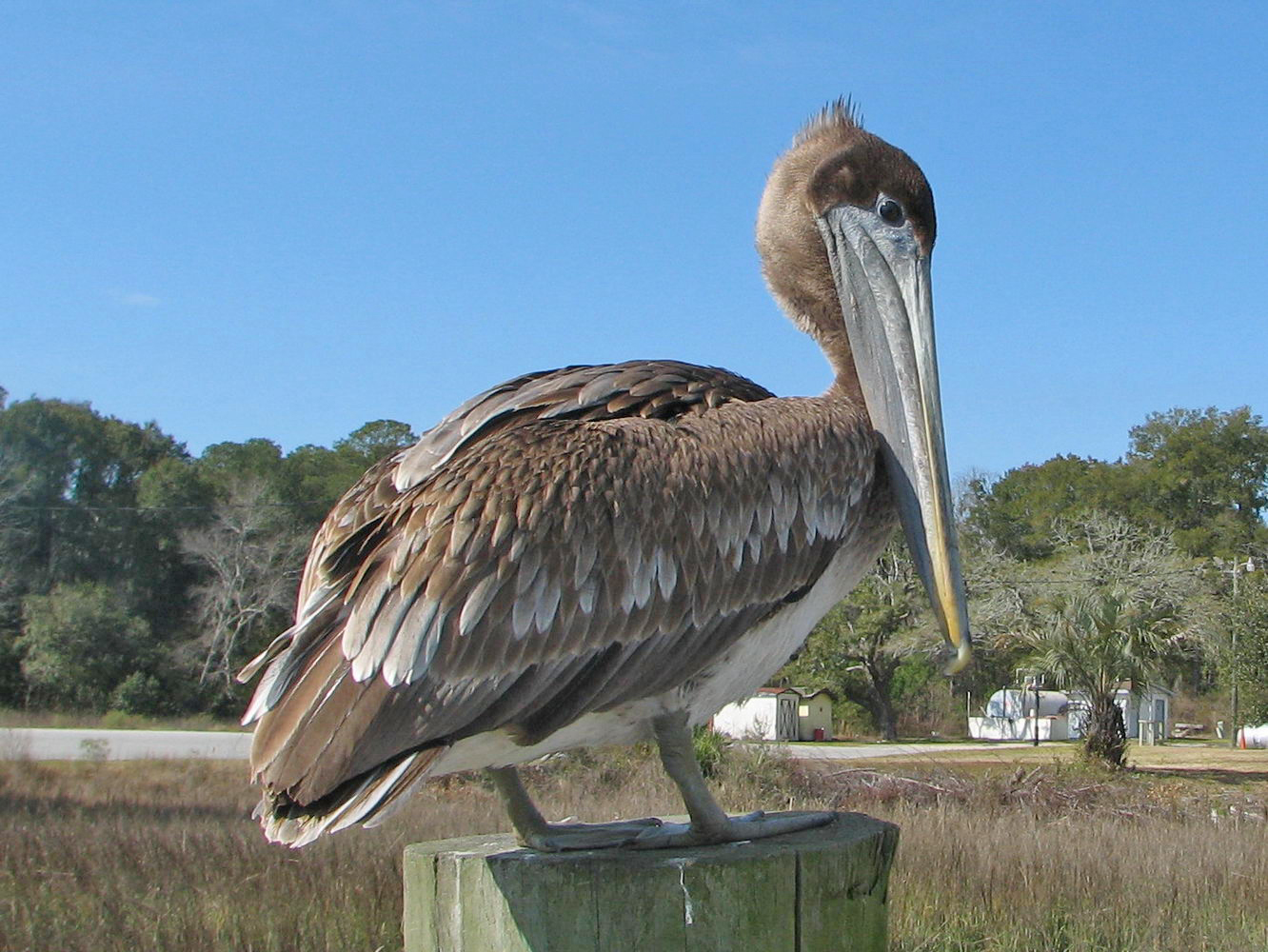
The brown pelican is the official state bird of Louisiana.

Approximately 160 species of birds are year-round residents or probable confirmed breeders in Louisiana and another 244 are known to regularly migrate through or winter in the state or its immediate adjacent waters. There are 69 species on the CWCS species of conservation concern list of which 42 species are considered critically threatened, imperiled or rare, according to the Louisiana Natural Heritage Program. Shorebirds and songbirds constitute the majority of species. In 1902, the eastern brown pelican was made a part of the Seal of Louisiana and, ten years later, in 1912, the pelican and her young adorned the flag of Louisiana as well. The official nickname of Louisiana is the Pelican State.

In 1958, the pelican was made the official state bird of Louisiana. This act was amended on July 26, 1966, to specifically designate the brown pelican. The National Basketball Association's New Orleans Pelicans are named in honor of Louisiana's state bird. The eastern brown pelican is also the national bird of Barbados and the Turks and Caicos Islands, it is also one of the mascots of Tulane University and is on the seals of Tulane University, Louisiana State University and the University of Louisiana at Lafayette.

Shore birds are abundant in Louisiana and the most common is the great white egret. This large, all-white heron has an impressive wingspan and stature. The egret occurs often in the wetlands of Louisiana and coastal areas that provides it with plenty of fish, amphibians and small mammals to feast on. This bird is also the official symbol of the National Audubon Society.

The American bald eagle nests in southeastern coastal parishes and, occasionally on large lakes in northern and central parishes, but these nests are less successful. Some of America's tallest birds, such as the great blue heron and great egret, cannot resist the fishing opportunities that exist in the Louisiana swampland. Raptors such as the osprey, American black vulture and barred owl live in the marshes of southern Louisiana. Migratory waterfowl and songbirds often make stopovers or actually spend the winter in these wetlands.

== Amphibians ==
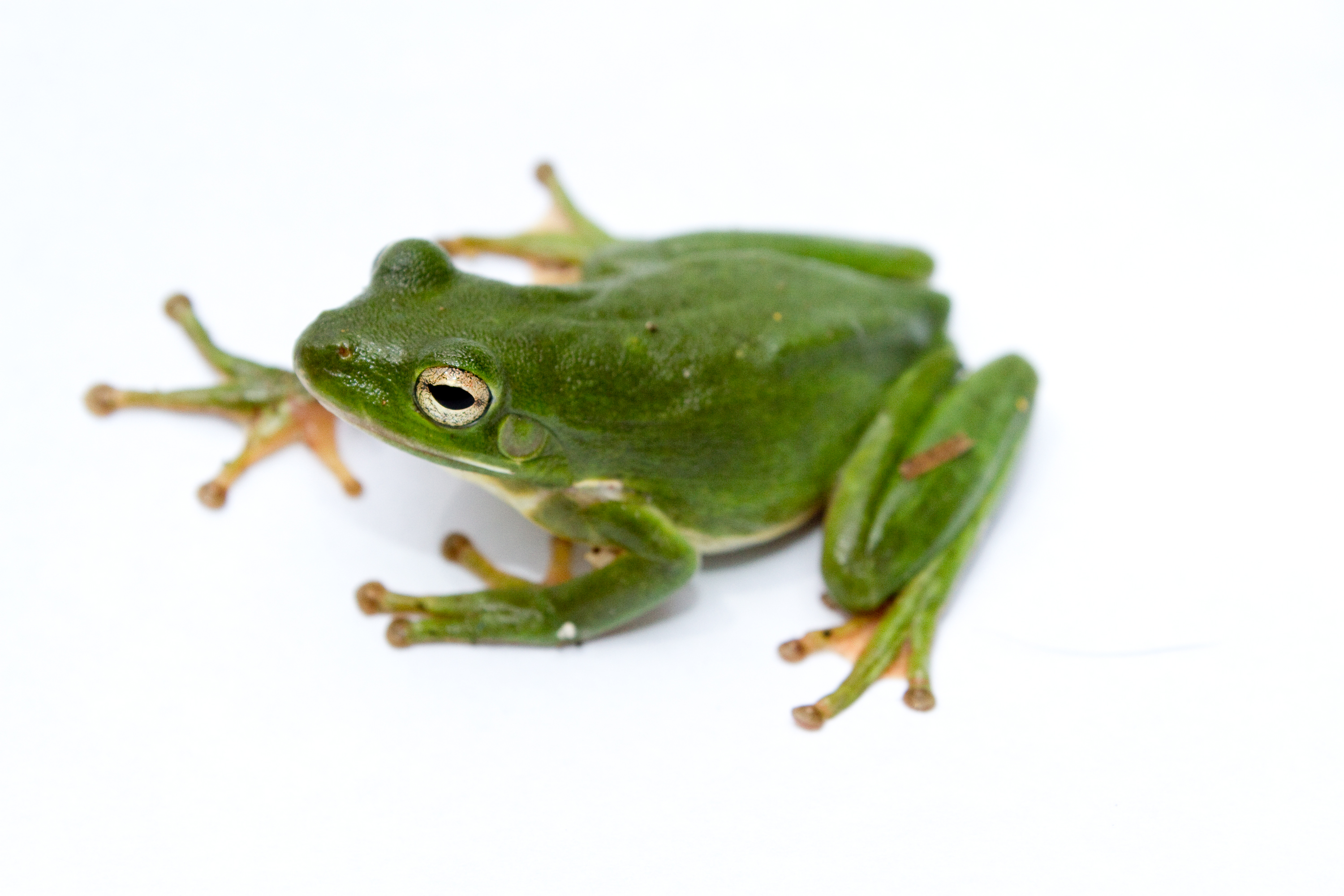
The American green tree frog is the official state amphibian and lives in every parish in the state.

The American green tree frog was designated the official state amphibian of Louisiana in 1993. Examples of other amphibians in Louisiana are salamanders such as the eastern tiger salamander, southern red-backed salamander, Gulf Coast waterdog, dwarf salamander and the three-toed amphiuma. There are also toads such as Hurter's spadefoot toad and southern toad, as well as frogs such as pig frog, striped chorus frog and the bronze frog. American bullfrogs are the largest frogs native to Louisiana.

== Fish ==
The white perch (Pomoxis annularis), sometimes called sac au lait from Cajun French, was designated the official state fish of Louisiana in 1993. Coastal beaches are inhabited by sea turtles. Freshwater fish include bass, crappie, and bream. Red and white crawfishes are the leading commercial crustaceans.

Many sharks have been observed in Louisiana waters; including, but not limited to lemon sharks, tiger sharks, bull sharks and blacktip sharks. The sharks, for instance the bull shark, have often been observed throughout the Atchafalaya Basin, 900 miles up the Mississippi River, and in inland bayous and wetlands. The alligator gar and the frecklebelly madtom, which is native to Pearl River in Southeastern Louisiana, are two additional species of fish in Louisiana.

The bowfin, known by many other names such as the mudfish, dogfish, grinnel, grindel, jack, jackfish, cypress trout, cotton fish, and in South Louisiana; choupique (pronounced shoe-pick or shoe-peg), is found in many areas of Louisiana.

== Endangered species ==
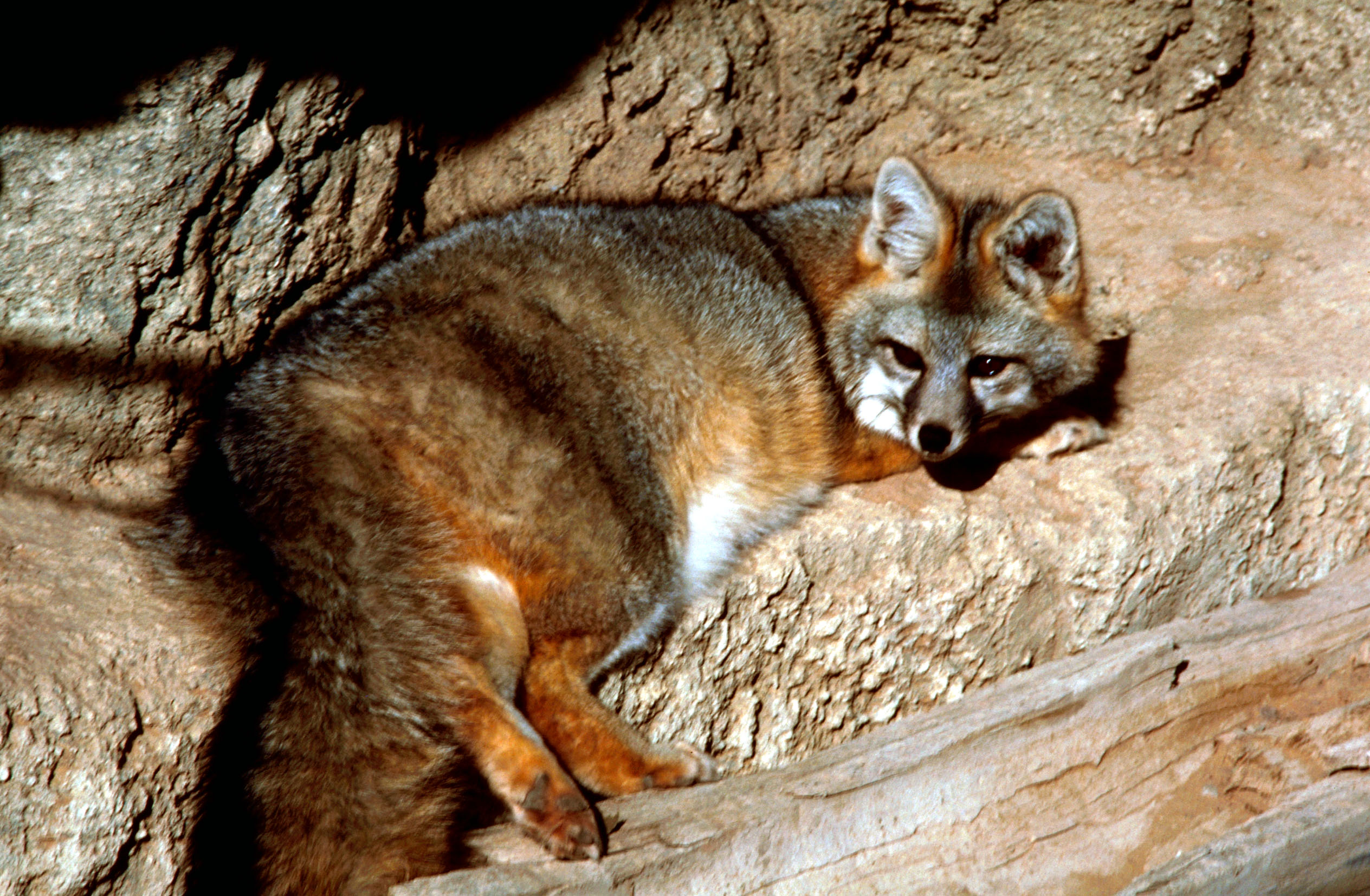
The gray fox lives throughout Louisiana, but is still threatened. They are most common in forested northern areas.

Threatened animal species include five species of sea turtles: green, hawksbill, Kemp's ridley, leatherback, and loggerhead. Twenty-three Louisiana animal species were on the U.S. Fish and Wildlife Service's threatened and endangered species list for 2003. Among those listed are the Louisiana black bear, American bald eagle, inflated heelsplitter, and red-cockaded woodpecker. The Louisiana WAP identifies 240 species of concern. The mountain lion population in Louisiana is small but growing in recent times. There is a relatively small and threatened population of Louisiana black bears.

The historic range of the Florida panther extended from Florida to Louisiana throughout the Gulf Coast states and Arkansas. Today, the only place with wild Florida panthers is the southwestern tip of Florida. The Florida panther is considered of historical occurrence in Louisiana. The historic range included as far west as Western Louisiana and the East Lower Mississippi River Valley through the southeastern states. Even though numerous sighting reports continue to surface annually throughout its historic range, it is unlikely that viable populations of the Florida panther presently occur outside of the State of Florida. The Louisiana black bear has been taken off the endangered species list. Mississippi diamondback terrapin is recognized as a "species of concern" in Louisiana, but is found on the Mississippi border.

== Invasive species ==
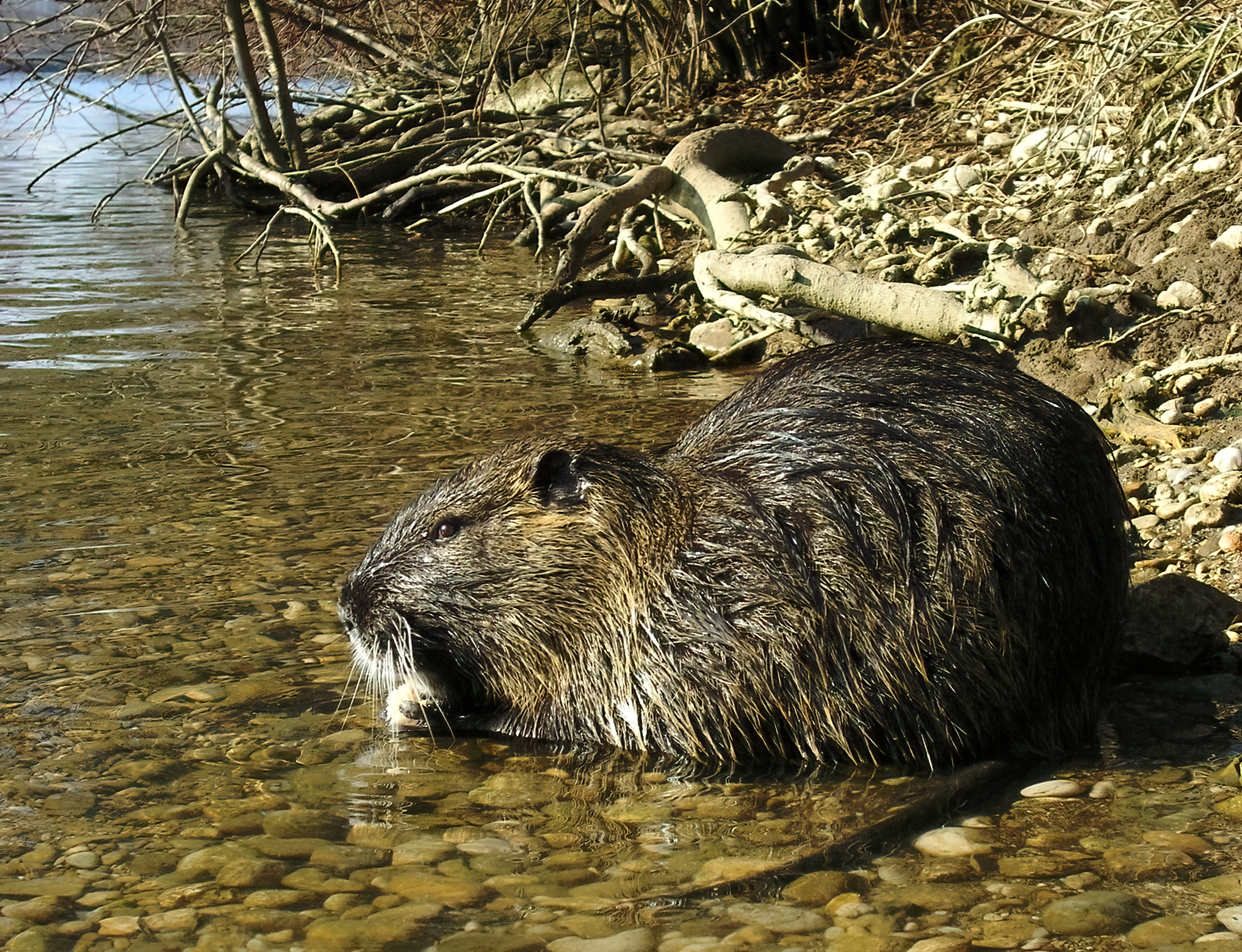
The nutria, also known as coypu or river rat, is an invasive species. Its destructive feeding and burrowing behaviors make this invasive rodent a pest throughout Louisiana.

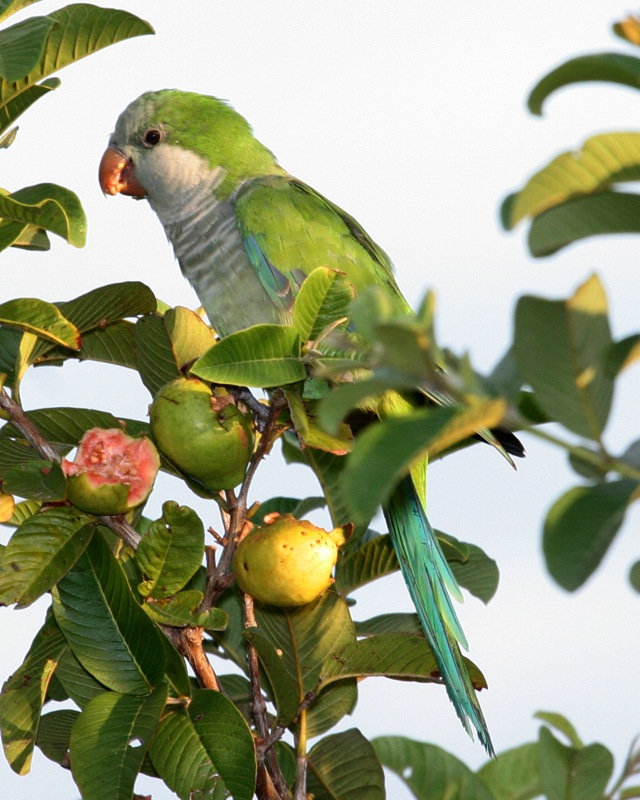
Native to South America, Quaker parrots are considered an invasive species and are known to damage fruit crops. These parrots have nested in the New Orleans metropolitan area since the 1960s.

=== Nutria ===
Tabasco tycoon and naturalist Edward McIlhenny brought thirteen adult nutria from Argentina to his home in New Iberia, during the 1930s, for the fur farming industry. Two years later, one hundred and fifty got out of the pen, supposedly escaping during a storm. The nutria reproduced at a high rate, increasing by the thousands every year. By the 1960s the number ranged to as high as twenty million, and increasing. By the time the government instituted a control program, the nutria was destroying Louisiana marshes and wetlands, causing widespread erosion. In the 21st century, the nutria is one of the most common and despised pests in the Bayou State.

The story of the nutria is not unique. Many species of birds, mammals, fish, and plants have been introduced into the Louisiana environment in the past two centuries. Exotic species, or species that have been introduced to areas outside their native range, take heavy tolls on the ecosystems they colonize. Some invaders, such as the leafy vine kudzu (Pueria lobelia), destroy the habitat for resident wildlife. Other species fiercely compete with native plants and animals for resources.

By some estimates, exotic species pose the second most serious threat to endangered species after habitat loss. Nutria were introduced into coastal marshes from Latin America in the mid-1900s, and their population has since exploded into the millions. They cause serious damage to coastal marshes and may dig burrows in levees. Hence, Louisiana has had a bounty to try to reduce nutria numbers.

Large alligators feed heavily on nutria, so alligators may not only control nutria populations in Louisiana, but also prevent them spreading east into Florida and possibly the Everglades. Since hunting and trapping preferentially take the large alligators that are the most important in eating nutria, some changes in harvesting may be needed to capitalize on their ability to control nutria.

=== Monk parakeet ===
An agricultural pest in its native South American range, the monk parakeet was first brought to the U.S. as a cage bird. They were so popular that over 60,000 were imported between 1969 and 1972. By the 1980s it had already been released in many parts of the country and had established small breeding colonies. Twenty years later, monk parakeet numbers have increased exponentially but their distribution remains spotty.

Monk parakeets tend to be restricted to urban areas where they feed and nest in ornamental palm trees, occupying a niche that no indigenous bird holds. So far, their distribution in Louisiana has been limited almost exclusively to the City of New Orleans, where they have had no adverse effects on local wildlife. If their numbers increase, however, monk parakeets could pose a serious threat to agricultural areas, possibly becoming as much of a pest here as they already are in their native range.

=== Red fire ant ===
Native to South America, the red fire ant has flourished in many southern U.S. states since its introduction in the 1930s. Superficially similar to most other ants, the fire ant is a vicious predator, attacking birds, rodents, and larger mammals in swarms.

One study of white-tailed deer found that death rates for young deer were twice as high in areas with fire ants as in uninfested areas. In Louisiana, the spread of fire ants has been linked to the decline of the loggerhead shrike and some species of warblers. The red fire ant has replaced nearly half the native insect species in some areas it has colonized.

== See also ==
- Fauna of the United States
