= Louisiana Technical College =

Louisiana Technical Colleges Originally Trade Schools
- Type: Public
- Active: 1930–2012
- Location: LTC had 42 Campuses Statewide, Louisiana, United States

Louisiana Technical College (LTC) was an institute for professional technical education in the state of Louisiana, with campuses across the state. Louisiana Technical College had no affiliation to Louisiana Tech University.

== Transition to Louisiana Community & Technical College System ==
The Louisiana Community and Technical College System (LCTCS) was created in 1999 to bring together into one governance body almost all of the state's community and technical colleges. The LCTCS was created by Act 151 of the 1998 First Extraordinary Session. Management of the LTC was transferred from BESE to the LCTCS Board of Supervisors in 1999.

== 2008 shooting ==
On the morning of February 8, 2008, Latina Williams, a 23-year-old nursing student with psychiatric disorders, fired six rounds with a .357 revolver in a second-floor classroom at the Baton Rouge campus of LTC before turning the gun on herself and committing suicide. The two victims were Karsheika Graves (21) and Tanieshia Butler (26), who were both fatally shot.

== 2006 Dissolution of the LTC ==
Act 506 of the 2005 Louisiana Regular Session required that the LTC be reorganized with March 2006 deadline for implementation. Changes to the LTC were approved at the March 7, 2006 LCTCS Board of Supervisors Meeting. On July 1, 2006, the Louisiana Technical College ceased to exist as a single entity. The campuses of the LTC were realigned into new colleges. These included Arcadiana Technical College, Capital Area Technical College, Central Louisiana Technical College, Northshore Technical College, Northeast Louisiana Technical College, Northwest Louisiana Technical College, and South Central Louisiana Technical College. The new colleges operated under the LTC name until 2012.

== National Alternative Fuels Training Consortium ==
This college was a NAFTC's Training Center.

== Campus locations ==
Region 1 Campuses

Merged with Delgado Community College, New Orleans
- Orleans Regional Technical Institute; merged with Delgado Community College on July 1, 1997.
- Sidney N. Collier Campus; merged with Delgado Community College
- West Jefferson Campus; merged with Delgado Community College
- Jefferson Campus; merged with Delgado Community College

On August 15, 2010, Louisiana Technical College's Region 1 become part of Delgado Community College's Technical Division.

Region 2 Campuses

Capital Area Technical College

- Baton Rouge (main campus); merged with Baton Rouge Community College
- Folkes Branch, Jackson; merged with Baton Rouge Community College.
- Jumonville, New Roads; merged with Baton Rouge Community College.
- Port Allen; merged with Baton Rouge Community College.
- Westside, Plaquemine; merged with Baton Rouge Community College.

Capital Area Technical College's five campuses were merged with Baton Rouge Community College (BRCC).

Region 3 Campuses

South Central Louisiana Technical College

- Galliano, Cut Off; merged with Fletcher Technical Community College
- Lafourche, Thibodaux; merged with Fletcher Technical Community College
- River Parishes, Reserve: merged with River Parishes Community College
- Young Memorial, Morgan City; merged with South Louisiana Community College

On July 1, 2018, SCLTC was abolished and the campuses transferred to several state community colleges.

Region 4 Campuses

Acadiana Technical College (ATC)
- Acadian, Crowley; merged with South Louisiana Community College.
- CB Coreil, Ville Platte; merged with South Louisiana Community College.
- Evangeline, St. Martinville; merged with South Louisiana Community College.
- Gulf Area, Abbeville; merged with South Louisiana Community College.
- Lafayette; merged with South Louisiana Community College.
- Teche Area, New Iberia; merged with South Louisiana Community College.
- TH Harris, Opelousas; merged with South Louisiana Community College.

On July 1, 2012, Acadiana Technical College (ATC) was merged with South Louisiana Technical Community College.

Region 6 Campuses

Central Louisiana Technical College

- Alexandria; now a campus of Central Louisiana Technical Community College
- Huey P. Long, Winnfield; now a campus of Central Louisiana Technical Community College
- Rod Brady, Jena; now a campus of Central Louisiana Technical Community College
- Lamar Salter, Leesville; now a campus of Central Louisiana Technical Community College
- Oakdale; merged with Sowela Technical Community College
- Shelby M. Jackson, Ferriday; now a campus of Central Louisiana Technical Community College
- Ward H. Nash Avoyelles, Cottonport; now a campus of Central Louisiana Technical Community College

On July 1, 2018, the Oakdale campus was transferred to SOWELA Technical Community College.

On January 1, 2013, Central Louisiana Technical College (CLTC) became Central Louisiana Technical Community College (CLTCC).

Region 7 Campuses

Northwest Louisiana Technical College

- Mansfield; now a campus of Northwest Louisiana Technical Community College
- Natchitoches; merged with CLTCC
- Minden (main campus); now a campus of Northwest Louisiana Technical Community College
- Sabine Valley, Many; merged with CLTCC
- Shreveport; now a campus of Northwest Louisiana Technical Community College

On July 1, 2018, the Natchitoches and Sabine Valley campuses were transferred to Central Louisiana Technical Community College (CLTCC).

On July 1, 2019, Northwest Louisiana Technical College (NLTC) became Northwest Louisiana Technical Community College (NLTCC)

Region 8 Campuses

Northeast Louisiana Technical College

- Bastrop (main campus); merged with LDCC
- Delta Ouachita, West Monroe; merged with LDCC
- Lake Providence; merged with LDCC
- North Central, Farmerville; merged with LDCC
- Northeast, Winnsboro; merged with LDCC
- Ruston; merged with LDCC
- Tallulah; merged with LDCC

In July 2010 the Tallulah and Lake Providence campuses merged with Louisiana Delta Community College (LDCC).

In July 2012 the Bastrop, Farmerville, Ruston, West Monroe, and Winnsboro campuses merged with Louisiana Delta Community College (LDCC).

Region 9 Campuses

Northshore Technical College

- Sullivan, Bogalusa (main campus); now a campus of Northshore Technical Community College
- Florida Parishes, Greensburg; now a campus of Northshore Technical Community College
- Hammond Area, Hammond; now a campus of Northshore Technical Community College
- Slidell Instructional Service Center, Slidell; closed

On January 1, 2012, Northshore Technical College (NTC) became Northshore Technical Community College (NTCC).

== See also ==
- List of colleges and universities in Louisiana
