= List of fire lookout towers in Louisiana =

Louisiana has 13.8 million acres of forestlands covering approximately 48% of the total state area. The majority (62%) is owned by private, non-industrial landowners, forest industries own 29% and 9% are public lands. The Louisiana Department of Agriculture and Forestry (LDAF), Office of Forestry, is tasked with timberland wildfire suppression. and the state maintain eight district headquarters with seventeen divisions and many substations or yards.

== History ==
By Act 113 the Louisiana legislature created the Department of Forestry in 1904. The Department of Conservation was created by Act 144 in 1908. In 1915 funds were directed for fire protection work allowing the hiring of lookout watchmen or patrolmen. In 1917 public education for fire prevention work began. In 1922 the first steel fire tower was built near Bogalusa on Great Southern Lumber Company land. In 1923 the second tower was built near Urania. Prior to these two towers rungs were nailed to a pine tree with a perch erected near the top. By 1943 thirty-nine fire towers had been built and by 1950 the number had increased to fifty-six.

== List of fire towers ==
Many fire towers still exist with the majority being inactive but many are maintained in reserve. Those having coordinates below can be seen together on a map by clicking "Map all coordinates using OpenSourceMap" at the right side of this page.

Name	Parish	Nearest town or city	Coordinates	Status	Notes
Abita lookout tower	St. Tammany	Mandeville	30°26′14″N 90°02′45″W	Still standing.	Unsure if still used, property is owned and actively used by the LA Dept. of Agriculture. Can be seen here on Google Street View.
Aimwell Lookout Tower	Catahoula	Aimwell (Northeast of Jena)	31°47′48″N 91°58′46″W	Torn down?	Cannot verify on aerial imagery, removed from USGS maps in 2015. Aimwell Lookout Tower
Angie Lookout Tower	Washington	Angie	30°57′52″N 89°51′20″W	Torn down.	The USGS site lists the tower as "Angle", last appearance on a USGS map was in 2012.
Antiock Lookout Tower	Claiborne	Haynesville	32°52′45″N 93°00′33″W	Torn down?	Last appears labeled on USGS map from 2012. GNIS ID: 1630038
Antonia Lookout Tower	Grant	Pollock	31°36′06″N 92°25′14″W	Torn down.	Last labeled on a USGS map in 2012, cannot find on aerial imagery.
Athens Lookout Tower	Claiborne	Athens	32°39′28″N 93°3′35″W	Torn down.	USGS Maps labeled the tower in 2012, but removed it from the 2015 map. Cannot find on earliest aerial imagery in the area.
Bay Spring Lookout Tower	LaSalle	Community of Little Creek	31°44′37″N 92°15′34″W	Torn down.	Last appears labeled on 2012 USGS map, cannot find on earliest aerial imagery in the area from 1998.
Beaver Lookout Tower	Evangeline	Beaver	30°46′49″N 92°33′30″W	Torn down.	Unable to view on street view or older aerial imagery.
Beekman Lookout Tower	Morehouse	Beekman	32°55′46″N 91°51′5″W	Torn down.	Unable to view on street view or older aerial imagery.
Bel Lookout Tower	Allen	Bel	30°31′21″N 93°5′1″W	Torn down.	Visible on aerial imagery until 2018. Can be seen here on Google Street View.
Belah Lookout Tower	La Salle	Belah	31°38′32″N 92°10′55″W	Torn down.	Unable to view on street view or older aerial imagery.
Big Hill Lookout Tower	Sabine	Robeline	31°41′29″N 93°14′50″W	Torn down.	Unable to view on street view or older aerial imagery.
Blackburn Lookout Tower	Claiborne	Blackburn	32°50′22″N 93°10′58″W	Torn down.	Appears on aerial imagery from 1998.
Blue Lake Lookout Tower	Sabine	Ebarb	31°35′41″N 93°44′17″W	Torn down.	Disappears from USGS Maps in 1983. Unable to find in aerial imagery.
Bodcau Lookout Tower	Bossier	Bellevue	32°41′50″N 93°30′23″W	Torn down.	Torn down in 2009 for construction of additional state park facilities. Can be seen on Google Street View here.
Bolinger Lookout Tower	Bossier	Bolinger	32°56′29″N 93°43′52″W	Torn down.	Appears on 1984 revision of 1955 map, disappears on 1981 version of the map. Unable to find aerial imagery.
Clinton Lookout Tower	East Feliciana	Clinton	30°52′36″N 90°56′41″W	Torn down.	Visible on satellite imagery up until 2019, can be seen here on Google Street View before decommission.
Dry Creek Fire Tower	Beauregard	Dry Creek	30°39′54″N 92°59′42″W	Still standing/Inactive	Damaged
Evans Lookout Tower	Vernon	Evans	30°58′57″N 93°26′22″W	Torn down.	Tower is visible in historical aerial imagery. Appears to have seen demolition between 2016 and 2018.
Fields Fire Tower	Beauregard	Fields, DeQuincy	30°33′29″N 93°32′21″W	Still standing	Tower is visible here on Google Street View.
Gordon lookout tower	Beauregard	DeQuincy	30°28′47″N 93°20′11″W	Still standing* Used on high wind days	Tower is visible here on Google Street View.
Kisatchie Lookout Tower	Natchitoches	Kisatchie	31°27′20″N 93°10′51″W	Still standing/active use.	Tower can almost be seen here on Google Street View.
Liverpool Fire Tower	St. Helena	Greensburg	30°55′35″N 90°43′45″W	Still standing/active use.	Tower can be seen here on Google Street View.
Livingston Fire Tower	Livingston	Livingston	30°33′17″N 90°45′9″W	Torn down.	Tower was torn down between 2016 & 2017, can be seen here on Google Street View.
Longville Fire Tower	Beauregard	Longville, DeRidder	30°39′23″N 93°13′57″W	Torn down.	Tower was torn down in 2003~ for US 171/US 190 highway widening project. Clearly visible in google earth aerial imagery from 2003.
Lorraine Fire Tower	Tangipahoa	Lorraine	30°30′22″N 90°16′38″W	Still standing.	Tower looks disused/retired. Visible here on Google Street View.
Merryville Lookout Tower	Beauregard	Merryville	30°43′16″N 93°30′21″W	Torn down.	Tower is visible on old aerial imagery. Appears to have been torn down between 2015 and 2016. Base of the tower is barely visible here on Google Street View.
Pine Grove Lookout Tower	St. Helena	Pine Grove	30°42′38″N 90°45′10″W	Still standing.	Tower inconsistently labeled on maps. Last appears labeled in 2012. Cannot find in older aerial imagery. Update: Visible here on Google Street View
Pride Lookout Tower	East Baton Rouge	Pride	30°42′30″N 90°56′21″W	Torn down.	As with others, appears on 2012 map, removed from 2015 map. Visible here on Google Street View prior to decommission.
Sardis Lookout Tower	Winn	Atlanta	31°50′39″N 92°42′28″W	Torn down.	Last appears on USGS map from 2012, not visible in aerial imagery. Location was just NW of current water tower.
Sheridan Lookout Tower	Washington	Sheridan	30°51′29″N 89°58′24″W	Still standing/active use.	The USGS maps here from 1945 shows the location of a LA National Guard target range just south of this structure.
Springville Lookout Tower	Livingston	Springville	30°26′20″N 90°39′27″W	Torn down.	Long retired, the tower was removed in March 2018. Livingston Parish Fire Protection District #2 posted a video on Facebook of it coming down. Visible here on Google Street View.
Sunny Hill Lookout Tower	Washington	Sunny Hill	30°53′57″N 90°15′57″W	Still standing.	Visible here on Google Street View.
Walker Lookout Tower	Livingston	Walker	30°25′58″N 90°51′28″W	Torn down.	Can only verify on old maps. Current location of Livingston Parish Fire District #4 station.
Wilson Lookout Tower	East Feliciana	Wilson	30°54′21″N 91°6′47″W	Torn down.	Disappears from satellite imagery sometime after 2016. Top of the tower seems visible on nearby street view imagery from 2008, but resolution is of low quality.

- Notes: Towers on the National Historic Lookout Register (NHLR)
