= Sowela Technical Community College =

Community college in Lake Charles, Louisiana, United States

SOWELA Technical Community College
- Type: Public community college
- Established: 1938
- Chancellor: Neil Aspinwall
- Students: 4,000
- Location: Lake Charles, Louisiana, United States; 30°13′03″N 93°09′46″W
- Mascot: Flying Tigers
- Website: www.sowela.edu

SOWELA Technical Community College is a public community college in Lake Charles, Louisiana, with an additional instruction site in Jennings and Oakdale. The school's mascot is the Flying Tigers, named for World War II General Clair Chennault's 1st American Volunteer Group and their P-40 aircraft adorned with a shark-faced motif. SOWELA's Lake Charles campus was developed on property formerly used as Chennault Air Force Base.

Its service area includes Allen, Beauregard, Calcasieu, Cameron, and Jefferson Davis parishes.

== History ==
- In 1938, the Louisiana Legislature establishes the Southwest Louisiana Trade School.
- In 1952, the name was changed to Sowela Vocational Technical School, recognizing it as a technical school rather than a trade institute.
- In 1962, it was renamed as SOWELA (Southwest Louisiana) Technical Institute.
- In 1971, the institute received accreditation from the Commission on Occupational Education (COE) of the Southern Association of Colleges and Schools.
- In January 1980, the institute moved to its present location near Chennault International Airport on the east side of Lake Charles, Louisiana.
- In March 1990, the institute was renamed SOWELA Regional Technical Institute.
- On July 27, 1995, the institute was renamed to Louisiana Technical College – SOWELA Campus.
- In 2003, the Louisiana Community and Technical College System (LCTCS) Board of Supervisors changed the name and status of the institute – renaming it to SOWELA Technical Community College and giving it the status of a technical community college.

Following damage by Hurricane Rita in 2005, the Lake Charles campus was repaired and added four new buildings – the Phillips 66 Process Technology building, Arts and Humanities building, Nursing and Allied Health building, and Regional Training Center. An $8 million Student Services building is to be completed on the Lake Charles campus by mid-2017. Replacing the Morgan Smith Instructional Site in Jennings, a $10 million facility will be built in 2017 adjacent to the Jennings High School in Jefferson Davis Parish.

== Academics ==
The College offers associate degrees, technical diplomas, or certificates in 23 different programs. In the summer of 2014, SOWELA introduced the 16-week Fast Track Process Technology (PTEC) program, which provides a compressed pathway to an Associate of Applied Science in Process Technology to qualified students who already hold an Associate or higher-level degree.

== Notable alumni ==
- E. Holman Jones, former member of the Louisiana House of Representatives from Oakdale in Allen Parish
