= List of Louisiana state forests =

The following is a list of Louisiana state forests.

Name (by alphabetical order)	Location (of main entrance)
Alexander State Forest	Rapides Parish

== See also ==
- List of national forests of the United States
