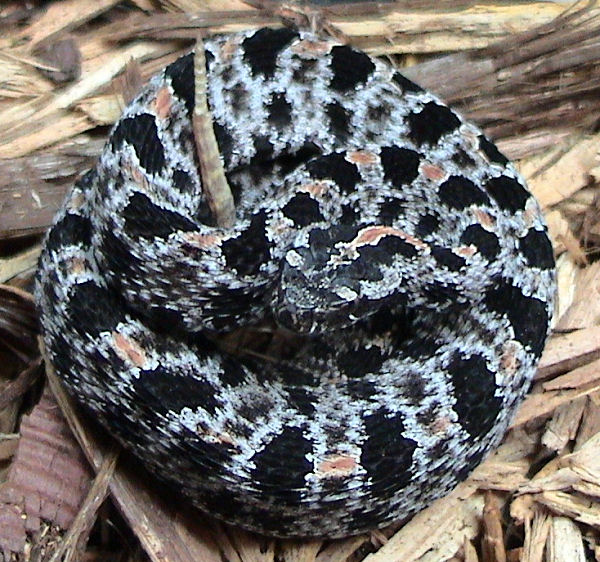

Scientific classification
- Domain: Eukaryota
- Kingdom: Animalia
- Phylum: Chordata
- Class: Reptilia
- Order: Squamata
- Suborder: Serpentes
- Family: Viperidae
- Genus: Sistrurus
- Species: S. miliarius
- Subspecies: S. m. streckeri

Trinomial name
- Sistrurus miliarius streckeri Gloyd, 1935

= Sistrurus miliarius streckeri =

Subspecies of snake

Common names: western pygmy rattlesnake, Strecker's pygmy rattlesnake, more.

Sistrurus miliarius streckeri is a venomous pit viper subspecies found in the southcentral United States.

== Etymology ==
The subspecific name, streckeri, is in honor of American naturalist John Kern Strecker.

== Description ==
Adult specimens of S. m. streckeri are 40–63 cm (16–25 in) in total length (including tail). In one study, the average length of 55 males and 49 females was 52 cm (20 in).

Its color pattern is distinct and very irregular, the middorsal series of blotches being plainly wider than they are long. Along the sides there are only 1-2 series of spots, the upper ones being higher than they are wide. Any dark pigment on the belly is diffuse, the blotches there usually not being wider than one scale. This race also has the lowest number of ventral scales for the species (Gloyd, 1935).

== Common names ==
Common names for S. m. streckeri include ground rattlesnake, pygmy rattlesnake, southern pygmy rattlesnake, Strecker's pygmy rattlesnake, western ground rattlesnake, western pygmy rattlesnake.

== Geographic range ==
Sistrurus miliarius streckeri is found in the United States in Mississippi (except for southeast of the Pearl River Valley), west through Louisiana into eastern Texas, and north into southeastern and central Oklahoma, Arkansas, southern Missouri, and southwestern Tennessee. The type locality listed is "... near Imboden, Lawrence County, Arkansas" (USA).
