= South Louisiana Community College =

Public college in Lafayette, Louisiana, US

- Logo of South Louisiana Community College
- Motto: Know. Know How.
- Type: Public community college
- Established: 1997; 29 years ago
- Parent institution: Louisiana Community and Technical College System
- Chancellor: Vincent G. June
- Location: Lafayette, Louisiana, United States
- Campus: Multiple
- Colors: Acadian Blue, Magnolia
- Website: www.solacc.edu

South Louisiana Community College (SoLAcc) is a public community college in Lafayette, Louisiana. It was established in 1997 to provide academic and vocational training.

Its service area includes Acadia, Evangeline, Iberville, Lafayette, Pointe Coupee, St. Landry, and Vermilion parishes, as well as the northern part of St. Martin Parish.

In July 2012, SoLAcc merged with the Acadiana Technical Colleges, thereby making SoLAcc a comprehensive community college with campuses in eight parishes. It is one of the largest community colleges in Louisiana with more than 7,000 students enrolled. SoLAcc awards associate degrees, transfer degrees, technical diplomas, and certifications.

== Campuses ==
South Louisiana Community College has nine campuses, in each of the eight core parishes of Acadiana:

- Lafayette Campus (Main), Lafayette Parish
- Acadian Campus, Acadia Parish
- C.B. Coreil Campus, Evangaline Parish
- New Iberia Campus, Iberia Parish
- T.H. Harris Campus, St. Landry Parish
- Evangeline Campus, St. Martin Parish
- Franklin Campus, St. Mary Parish
- Young Memorial Campus, St. Mary Parish
- Gulf Area Campus, Vermillion Parish
South Louisiana Community College Campuses.

The college is administered from the main Lafayette campus, which consists of three buildings. The Devalcourt Building contains the main lobby of the college, as well as most general education classes. The Ted Ardoin building houses the welding department and many other technical training programs, as well as Financial Aid. In 2016, a new building was erected, containing 3 floors, known as the Health and Sciences building. This contains the Nursing Program, as well as the Administrative Suite and other classrooms.

== Academics ==
SoLAcc is divided into four academic divisions, including:

- Business, Information Technology, and Technical Studies
- Liberal Arts and Humanities
- STEM, Transportation, and Energy
- Nursing and Allied Health

The college offers 2-year Associates degrees, as well as industry and technical training, with over 50 programs available.

South Louisiana Community College was recognized by the Aspen Institute as a top 150 community college in 2023.

== Schools of Choice ==
Lafayette Parish School System (LPSS) added a "School of Choice" called the Early College Academy in 2008, which gives high school students (grades 9–12) a chance to graduate with a high school diploma as well as a two-year associate degree in the field of their choice. Students take all courses on the campus of South Louisiana Community College, and most school days begin at 8:30 and end around 4 p.m. It is the only school of its kind in the state of Louisiana.
