= List of salt domes in Louisiana =

There are 128 identified salt domes in the U.S. state of Louisiana. They are divided by type or location.

== The Five Coastal Domes ==
Referred to as the "The Five Islands"

- Avery Island (Petit Anse)
- Jefferson Island (Côte Carline) and Diamond Crystal salt mine: Site of the 1980 Lake Peigneur drilling disaster
- Weeks Island
- Belle Isle
- Cote Blanche Island (White Castle)

== Subsurface Coastal Domes ==
Found in Southern Louisiana

- Anse La Butte Salt Dome in St. Martin Parish.
- Bayou Blue Salt Dome (or Bayou Bleu Field) in Iberville Parish
- Bayou Choctaw Salt Dome (Iberville Parish) — Active Strategic Petroleum Reserve site holding 76 million barrels of crude oil
- Bayou Pigeon field (Iberville Parish)
- Black Bayou Salt Dome (Calcasieu and Cameron Parishes) Black Bayou Gas Storage consists of four salt domes slated to hold 34.7 billion cubic feet (Bcf) of natural gas.
- Bully Camp Salt Dome (Lafourche Parish): Located in the Pointe-aux-Chenes Wildlife Management Area (WMA). Produced Sulphur by the Frasch process from 1968 to 1978.
- Caillou Island Salt Dome (Terrebonne Parish) in the gulf. Part of the Bay Marchand-Timbalier Bay-Caillou Island salt complex
- Chacahoula Salt Dome (Lafourche Parish)
- Clovelly Salt Dome (Lafourche Parish)
- Darrow Salt Dome (Ascension Parish)
- Delarge Salt Dome (Terrebonne Parish)
- Fausse Point Salt Dome (Iberia/St. Martin Parishes)
- Garden Island Bay Salt Dome (Plaquemines Parish)
- Hackberry Salt Domes (East & West) (Cameron Parish) — West Hackberry is an active Strategic Petroleum Reserve site.
- Lake Hermitage Salt Dome(Plaquemines Parish)
- Lake Washington Salt Dome (Plaquemines Parish)
- Leeville Salt Dome (Lafourche Parish)
- Napoleonville Salt Dome in Assumption Parish was discovered in September of 1926. It is considered to be the largest salt dome in Louisiana measuring 1 mile by 3 miles. The dome was discovered to be collapsing on August 3, 2012. The collapse caused the Bayou Corne sinkhole that appears to have slowed or stopped growing, possibly reaching its maximum size at 37 acres (15 ha).
- Plumb Bob Salt Dome (St. Martin Parish): Oil production.
- Port Barre Salt Dome (St. Landry Parish): Bobcat Gas Storage Facility holds 20.5 billion cubic feet (Bcf) of natural gas with a capacity of 39.6 Bcf.
- Section 28 Salt Dome (St. Martin Parish)
- Sorrento Salt Dome (Ascension Parish): Stores 35 million barrels of liquid hydrocarbons (propane and butane) with a capacity to store 8.92 billion cubic feet (bcf) of natural gas.
- Starks Salt Dome (Calcasieu Parish): 19.2 Bcf working capacity. A notice of intent was filed on 12/07/2004 by Starks Gas Storage LLC, a subsidiary of EnCana Corporation. On September 18, 2006, it was reported the greenlight had been given. Completion was expected between mid-2006 and 2007. Riverstone Holdings and The Carlyle Group acquired the location.
- Stella Salt Dome (Plaquemines Parish): Active oil and gas drilling and production.
- Sulphur Mines Salt Dome (Calcasieu Parish) — The historic structural birthplace of the Frasch mining method.
- Sweet Lake Salt Dome (Cameron Parish): Active oil production.
- Valentine Salt Dome also called the LaRose Dome (Lafourche Parish)
- Venice Salt Dome (Plaquemines Parish): Designed to hold 20 million barrels of Liquid Petroleum Gas (LPG) and Natural Gas Liquids (NGL)
- White Castle Salt Dome (Iberville Parish): Not the same as Cote Blanche Island is located in St. Mary Parish.

== Interior Basin Domes ==
Found in North Louisiana

- Arcadia Salt Dome (Bienville Parish): Working storage capacity of around 14 to 15 billion cubic feet
- Bistineau Salt Dome (Webster Parish)
- Cedar Creek Salt Dome (Winn Parish)
- Chestnut Salt Dome (Natchitoches Parish): Located in Choctaw Creek, a branch of Saline Bayou.
- Coochie Brake Salt Dome (Winn Parish)
- Drake's Salt Dome (Winn Parish)
- Gibsland Salt Dome (Bienville Parish)
- Kings Salt Dome (Bienville Parish)
- Milam Salt Dome (Winn Parish)
- Mindon Salt Dome (Webster Parish)
- Packton Salt Dome (Winn Parish)
- Price’s Salt Dome (Winn Parish) near Calvin
- Prothro Salt Dome in southern Bienville Parish, 4 miles northwest from Saline.
- Rayburns Salt Dome (Bienville Parish): 6 miles northeast of the town of Saline and 2 miles west of the community of Friendship.
- Saline Salt Dome (Winn Parish): 3.5 miles southeast of the town of Saline
- Vacherie Dome in Bienville and Webster Parishes, Louisiana.
- Winnfield Salt Dome (salt dome) in Winn Parish. From 1931 to November 18, 1965, when an underground river flooded it.
