= River Parishes Community College =

Community college in Gonzales, Louisiana, U.S.

Coordinates: 30.1911°N 90.9308°W

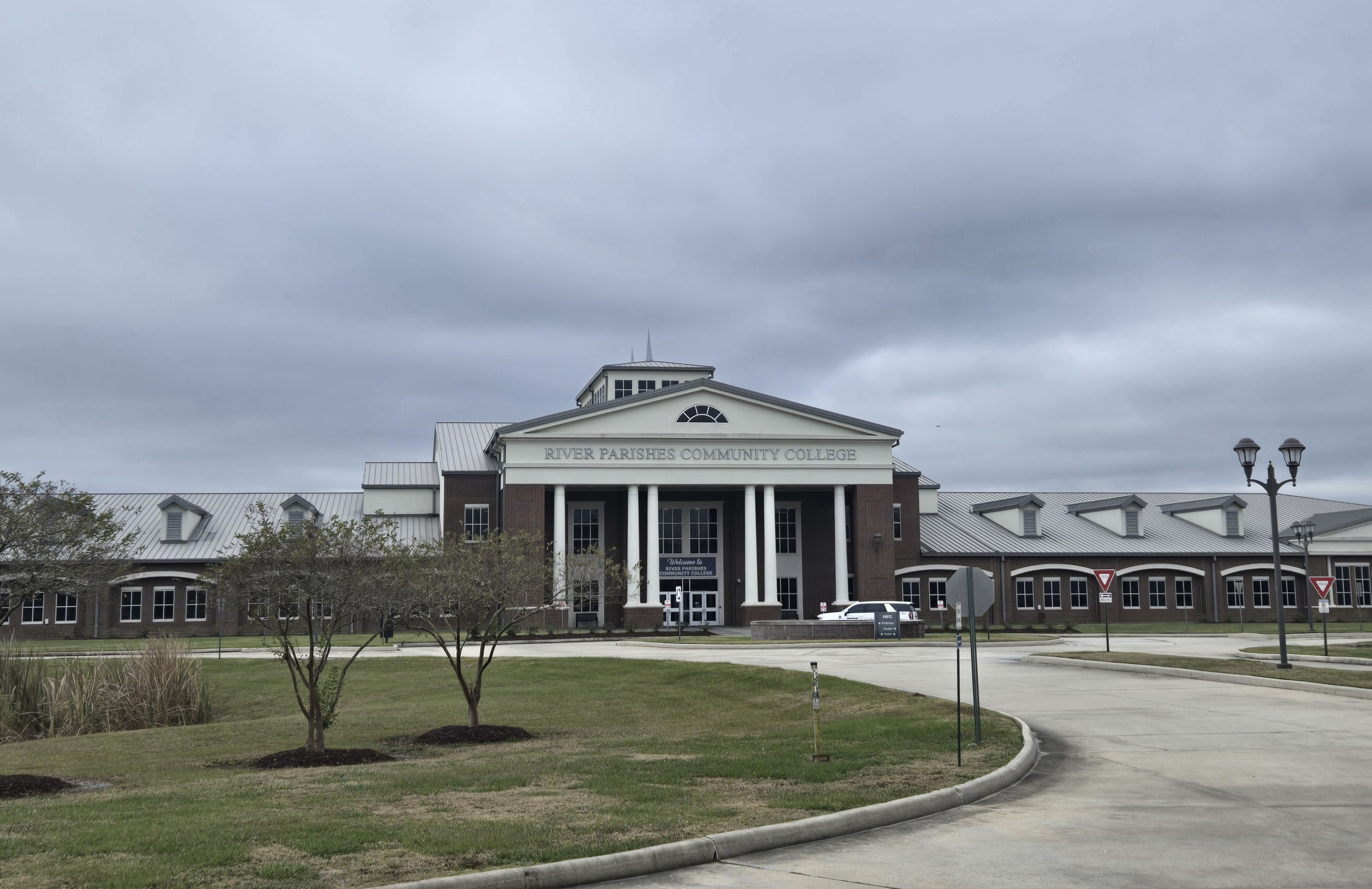
- Type: Public community college
- Established: 1997
- Parent institution: Louisiana Community and Technical College System
- Students: 2,406
- Location: Gonzales, Louisiana, U.S.
- Campus: Rural
- Website: www.rpcc.edu

River Parishes Community College (RPCC) is a public community college in Gonzales, Louisiana.

== History ==
The college was established in 1997, pursuant to state legislation organizing the system of community and technical colleges. The school was originally located in Sorrento, Louisiana but was moved to Gonzales in 2014 with the construction of a new campus in the Edenborne Development.

In August 2016, students from Galvez Primary, Lake Elementary, and St. Amant Primary School were sent to the old campus because the schools in Ascension Parish were flooded.

== Course offerings ==
RPCC offers Early College Programs for high-school students to obtain their associates degree and high school diploma concurrently.
