= Joe D. May =

American educator and academic administrator

Joe D. May is an American educator in the post-secondary college and technical school field. May earned his doctorate in education from Texas A&M-Commerce and a Master of Education and Bachelor of Science from Stephen F. Austin State University, Nacogdoches, Texas.

== Career ==
May's background includes serving in leadership roles in business organizations, as well as public and private colleges and universities. He has provided consulting services to new community college initiatives in Japan, the United Kingdom, Russia, and Saudi Arabia. May's experience ranges from having served as a counselor and a faculty member to the Chancellor of the Dallas County Community College District (now Dallas College).

May served as system president for the Louisiana Community and Technical College System. He was associated with a Dallas-based private equity firm, Best Merchant Partners, where he helped to develop two major for-profit educational initiatives, the American College of Education in Chicago, Illinois, and Bogota Community College in Bogota, Colombia. He also held positions as the Associate Vice President for Institutional Partnerships at Regis University in Denver (Colorado), Dean of Instruction and Student Development at Danville (Virginia) Community College and at Vernon College (Texas), was Dean of Student Services at Navarro College (Texas), and Assistant Professor of Education at Sul Ross State University (Texas).

On October 1, 2021, Dallas College faculty passed a resolution stating faculty have no confidence in chancellor Joe D. May to effectively lead Dallas College and calls for his immediate termination. The resolution vote, which was completed by 31%, or 263, of 849 full-time faculty at Dallas College, resulted in 71.43%, or 188 votes, in favor of the resolution of no confidence and 28.58%, or 73 votes, against the resolution. A separate petition, which gathered 45 signatures, was simultaneously sent to Dallas College full-time faculty to gather the names of faculty who support Joe D. May. 22% of Dallas College faculty oppose Joe D. May as the chancellor while 5% publicly support him.

== Current position ==
May is chancellor emeritus elect of Dallas College, formerly Dallas County Community College District.

In his former position as president of the Louisiana Community and Technical College System, unduplicated enrollment grew from 71,000 to 111,000. May was the driver behind developing and passing landmark legislation that has made available over $200 million in construction funds for technical and community colleges. He also moved adult education from a K-12 program to a community and technical college program, and established a model articulation and transfer initiative that is enabling more students to pursue a baccalaureate degree. He is also a board member of Rebuilding America’s Middle Class (RAMC).
