= Lorraine, Tangipahoa Parish, Louisiana =

Lorraine, Louisiana
- Unincorporated community
- Location within Louisiana Location within the United States
- Coordinates: 30°30′22″N 90°16′42″W
- Country: United States
- State: Louisiana
- Parish: Tangipahoa
- Elevation: 3 ft (0.91 m)
- Time zone: UTC-6 (Central (CST))
  - Summer (DST): UTC-5 (CDT)
- Area code: 985
- GNIS feature ID: 541131
- FIPS code: 22-45760

Lorraine is an unincorporated community in Tangipahoa Parish, Louisiana, United States. The community is located 15 miles (24.14 kilometres) W of Covington, Louisiana.
