= Joe Mays (catcher) =

American baseball player (1914-1986)

- Catcher
- Born: March 20, 1914; Sweet Home, Arkansas, U.S.
- Died: February 1986; Sweet Home, Arkansas, U.S.
- Threw: Right

Negro league baseball debut
- 1937, for the St. Louis Stars

Last appearance
- 1937, for the St. Louis Stars

Teams
- St. Louis Stars (1937)

Walter "Joe" Mays (March 20, 1914 – February 1986) was an American Negro league catcher in the 1930s.

A native of Sweet Home, Arkansas, Mays played for the St. Louis Stars in 1937. He died in Sweet Home in 1986 at age 71.
