= Louisiana statistical areas =

Coordinates: 31.0689°N 91.9968°W

The U.S. State of Louisiana currently has 25 statistical areas that have been delineated by the Office of Management and Budget (OMB). On July 21, 2023, the OMB delineated six combined statistical areas, ten metropolitan statistical areas, and nine micropolitan statistical areas in Louisiana. As of 2023, the largest of these is the New Orleans-Metairie-Slidell, LA-MS CSA, comprising the area around New Orleans in the southeast region of the state.

== Statistical areas ==
The Office of Management and Budget (OMB) has designated more than 1,000 statistical areas for the United States and Puerto Rico. These statistical areas are important geographic delineations of population clusters used by the OMB, the United States Census Bureau, planning organizations, and federal, state, and local government entities.

The OMB defines a core-based statistical area (commonly referred to as a CBSA) as the county or counties (or county-equivalents) surrounding at least one densely-settled core of at least 10,000 population, "plus adjacent counties having a high degree of social and economic integration with the core as measured through commuting ties with the counties containing the core". The OMB further divides core-based statistical areas based on population into metropolitan statistical areas (MSAs) for those with at least 50,000 and micropolitan statistical areas (μSAs) for those with 10,000 to 49,999 people.

The OMB defines a combined statistical area (CSA) as two or more adjacent core-based statistical areas where the employment interchange rate (% commuting from A to B plus % commuting from B to A) is at least 15%. The primary statistical areas (PSAs) include all combined statistical areas and any core-based statistical area that is not a constituent of a combined statistical area.

The 25 United States statistical areas and 64 parishes of the State of Louisiana (Note: An out-of-state area and its population are displayed in green. An area that extends into more than one state is displayed in purple. A purple population number over a black population number show the total population versus the in-state population. The state's abbreviation is also shown next to the in-state total.)
Combined statistical area	2025 population (est.)	Core-based statistical area	2025 population (est.)	County	2025 population (est.)
New Orleans–Metairie–Slidell, LA–MS CSA	1,354,257; 1,294,894 (LA)	New Orleans–Metairie, LA MSA	970,849	Jefferson Parish, Louisiana	431,398
New Orleans–Metairie–Slidell, LA–MS CSA	1,354,257; 1,294,894 (LA)	New Orleans–Metairie, LA MSA	970,849	Orleans Parish, Louisiana	362,154
New Orleans–Metairie–Slidell, LA–MS CSA	1,354,257; 1,294,894 (LA)	New Orleans–Metairie, LA MSA	970,849	St. Charles Parish, Louisiana	50,586
New Orleans–Metairie–Slidell, LA–MS CSA	1,354,257; 1,294,894 (LA)	New Orleans–Metairie, LA MSA	970,849	St. Bernard Parish, Louisiana	45,642
New Orleans–Metairie–Slidell, LA–MS CSA	1,354,257; 1,294,894 (LA)	New Orleans–Metairie, LA MSA	970,849	St. John the Baptist Parish, Louisiana	39,875
New Orleans–Metairie–Slidell, LA–MS CSA	1,354,257; 1,294,894 (LA)	New Orleans–Metairie, LA MSA	970,849	Plaquemines Parish, Louisiana	22,256
New Orleans–Metairie–Slidell, LA–MS CSA	1,354,257; 1,294,894 (LA)	New Orleans–Metairie, LA MSA	970,849	St. James Parish, Louisiana	18,938
New Orleans–Metairie–Slidell, LA–MS CSA	1,354,257; 1,294,894 (LA)	Slidell–Mandeville–Covington, LA MSA	279,108	St. Tammany Parish, Louisiana	279,108
New Orleans–Metairie–Slidell, LA–MS CSA	1,354,257; 1,294,894 (LA)	Picayune, MS μSA	59,363	Pearl River County, Mississippi	59,363
New Orleans–Metairie–Slidell, LA–MS CSA	1,354,257; 1,294,894 (LA)	Bogalusa, LA μSA	44,937	Washington Parish, Louisiana	44,937
Baton Rouge–Hammond, LA CSA	1,030,045	Baton Rouge, LA MSA	888,699	East Baton Rouge Parish, Louisiana	456,180
Baton Rouge–Hammond, LA CSA	1,030,045	Baton Rouge, LA MSA	888,699	Livingston Parish, Louisiana	155,036
Baton Rouge–Hammond, LA CSA	1,030,045	Baton Rouge, LA MSA	888,699	Ascension Parish, Louisiana	135,105
Baton Rouge–Hammond, LA CSA	1,030,045	Baton Rouge, LA MSA	888,699	Iberville Parish, Louisiana	29,579
Baton Rouge–Hammond, LA CSA	1,030,045	Baton Rouge, LA MSA	888,699	West Baton Rouge Parish, Louisiana	28,756
Baton Rouge–Hammond, LA CSA	1,030,045	Baton Rouge, LA MSA	888,699	Assumption Parish, Louisiana	19,720
Baton Rouge–Hammond, LA CSA	1,030,045	Baton Rouge, LA MSA	888,699	Pointe Coupee Parish, Louisiana	19,520
Baton Rouge–Hammond, LA CSA	1,030,045	Baton Rouge, LA MSA	888,699	East Feliciana Parish, Louisiana	18,911
Baton Rouge–Hammond, LA CSA	1,030,045	Baton Rouge, LA MSA	888,699	West Feliciana Parish, Louisiana	15,134
Baton Rouge–Hammond, LA CSA	1,030,045	Baton Rouge, LA MSA	888,699	St. Helena Parish, Louisiana	10,758
Baton Rouge–Hammond, LA CSA	1,030,045	Hammond, LA MSA	141,346	Tangipahoa Parish, Louisiana	141,346
Lafayette–New Iberia–Opelousas, LA CSA	571,369	Lafayette, LA MSA	423,758	Lafayette Parish, Louisiana	257,949
Lafayette–New Iberia–Opelousas, LA CSA	571,369	Lafayette, LA MSA	423,758	Vermilion Parish, Louisiana	57,671
Lafayette–New Iberia–Opelousas, LA CSA	571,369	Lafayette, LA MSA	423,758	Acadia Parish, Louisiana	57,032
Lafayette–New Iberia–Opelousas, LA CSA	571,369	Lafayette, LA MSA	423,758	St. Martin Parish, Louisiana	51,106
Lafayette–New Iberia–Opelousas, LA CSA	571,369	Opelousas, LA μSA	80,765	St. Landry Parish, Louisiana	80,765
Lafayette–New Iberia–Opelousas, LA CSA	571,369	New Iberia, LA μSA	66,846	Iberia Parish, Louisiana	66,846
Shreveport–Bossier City–Minden, LA CSA	418,422	Shreveport–Bossier City, LA MSA	383,474	Caddo Parish, Louisiana	224,226
Shreveport–Bossier City–Minden, LA CSA	418,422	Shreveport–Bossier City, LA MSA	383,474	Bossier Parish, Louisiana	131,867
Shreveport–Bossier City–Minden, LA CSA	418,422	Shreveport–Bossier City, LA MSA	383,474	De Soto Parish, Louisiana	27,381
Shreveport–Bossier City–Minden, LA CSA	418,422	Minden, LA μSA	34,948	Webster Parish, Louisiana	34,948
Lake Charles–DeRidder, LA CSA	281,328	Lake Charles, LA MSA	244,655	Calcasieu Parish, Louisiana	208,466
Lake Charles–DeRidder, LA CSA	281,328	Lake Charles, LA MSA	244,655	Jefferson Davis Parish, Louisiana	31,471
Lake Charles–DeRidder, LA CSA	281,328	Lake Charles, LA MSA	244,655	Cameron Parish, Louisiana	4,718
Lake Charles–DeRidder, LA CSA	281,328	DeRidder, LA μSA	36,673	Beauregard Parish, Louisiana	36,673
Monroe–Ruston, LA CSA	270,750	Monroe, LA MSA	222,390	Ouachita Parish, Louisiana	158,542
Monroe–Ruston, LA CSA	270,750	Monroe, LA MSA	222,390	Morehouse Parish, Louisiana	23,705
Monroe–Ruston, LA CSA	270,750	Monroe, LA MSA	222,390	Union Parish, Louisiana	20,561
Monroe–Ruston, LA CSA	270,750	Monroe, LA MSA	222,390	Richland Parish, Louisiana	19,582
Monroe–Ruston, LA CSA	270,750	Ruston, LA μSA	48,360	Lincoln Parish, Louisiana	48,360
none		Houma–Bayou Cane–Thibodaux, LA MSA	199,668	Terrebonne Parish, Louisiana	104,163
none		Houma–Bayou Cane–Thibodaux, LA MSA	199,668	Lafourche Parish, Louisiana	95,505
none		Alexandria, LA MSA	147,952	Rapides Parish, Louisiana	125,877
none		Alexandria, LA MSA	147,952	Grant Parish, Louisiana	22,075
none		Morgan City, LA μSA	46,552	St. Mary Parish, Louisiana	46,552
none		Natchitoches, LA μSA	36,089	Natchitoches Parish, Louisiana	36,089
none		Natchez, MS-LA μSA	54,722; 17,836 (LA)	Adams County, Mississippi	30,061
none		Natchez, MS-LA μSA	54,722; 17,836 (LA)	Concordia Parish, Louisiana	17,836
none		Natchez, MS-LA μSA	54,722; 17,836 (LA)	Jefferson County, Mississippi	6,825
none		none		Vernon Parish, Louisiana	45,091
none		none		Avoyelles Parish, Louisiana	37,941
none		none		Evangeline Parish, Louisiana	31,980
none		none		Allen Parish, Louisiana	22,672
none		none		Sabine Parish, Louisiana	21,834
none		none		Franklin Parish, Louisiana	19,002
none		none		La Salle Parish, Louisiana	15,154
none		none		Jackson Parish, Louisiana	15,834
none		none		Claiborne Parish, Louisiana	13,354
none		none		Winn Parish, Louisiana	14,961
none		none		Bienville Parish, Louisiana	12,269
none		none		Madison Parish, Louisiana	8,844
none		none		West Carroll Parish, Louisiana	9,156
none		none		Caldwell Parish, Louisiana	9,344
none		none		Catahoula Parish, Louisiana	8,223
none		none		Red River Parish, Louisiana	7,165
none		none		East Carroll Parish, Louisiana	6,760
none		none		Tensas Parish, Louisiana	3,700
State of Louisiana					4,618,189

The six combined statistical areas of the State of Louisiana (Note: For CSAs comprising populations from multiple states, they are listed twice to show both their intrastate population within that CSA as well as the CSA's total population. Only the intrastate population is ranked.)
2025 rank	Combined statistical area	Population				
2025 rank	Combined statistical area	2025 estimate	Change	2020 Census	Change	2010 Census
1	New Orleans-Metairie-Slidell, LA-MS CSA (LA)	1,294,894	−1.70%	1,317,308	+6.49%	1,237,034
2	Baton Rouge–Hammond, LA CSA	1,030,045	+2.62%	1,003,726	+5.99%	947,002
3	Lafayette–New Iberia–Opelousas, LA CSA	571,369	+1.86%	560,924	+1.96%	550,134
4	Shreveport–Bossier City–Minden, LA CSA	418,422	−2.78%	430,373	−2.15%	439,811
5	Lake Charles–DeRidder, LA CSA	281,328	−3.39%	291,201	+9.12%	266,855
6	Monroe–Ruston, LA CSA	270,750	−1.74%	275,543	+1.35%	271,880
	New Orleans-Metairie-Slidell, LA-MS CSA	1,354,257	−1.40%	1,373,453	+6.23%	1,292,868

The 19 core-based statistical areas of the State of Louisiana (Note: For CBSAs comprising populations from multiple states, they are listed twice to show both their intrastate population within that CBSA as well as the CBSA's total population. Only the intrastate population is ranked.)
2025 rank	Core-based statistical area	Population				
2025 rank	Core-based statistical area	2025 estimate	Change	2020 Census	Change	2010 Census
1	New Orleans-Metairie, LA MSA	970,849	−3.62%	1,007,275	+5.35%	956,126
2	Baton Rouge, LA MSA	888,699	+2.08%	870,569	+5.41%	825,905
3	Lafayette, LA MSA	423,758	+3.75%	408,455	+3.80%	393,510
4	Shreveport-Bossier City, LA MSA	383,474	−2.52%	393,406	−1.30%	398,604
5	Slidell-Mandeville-Covington, LA MSA	279,108	+5.49%	264,570	+13.19%	233,740
6	Lake Charles, LA MSA	244,655	−3.93%	254,652	+10.14%	231,201
7	Monroe, LA MSA	222,390	−2.09%	227,147	+0.89%	225,145
8	Houma–Bayou Cane–Thibodaux, LA MSA	199,668	−3.61%	207,137	−0.50%	208,178
9	Alexandria, LA MSA	147,952	−2.79%	152,192	−1.12%	153,922
10	Hammond, LA MSA	141,346	+6.15%	133,157	+9.96%	121,097
11	Opelousas, LA μSA	80,765	−2.15%	82,540	−1.01%	83,384
12	New Iberia, LA μSA	66,846	−4.41%	69,929	−4.52%	73,240
13	Ruston, LA μSA	48,360	−0.07%	48,396	+3.55%	46,735
14	Morgan City, LA μSA	46,552	−5.78%	49,406	−9.60%	54,650
15	Bogalusa, LA μSA	44,937	−1.16%	45,463	−3.61%	47,168
16	DeRidder, LA μSA	36,673	+0.34%	36,549	+2.51%	35,654
17	Natchitoches, LA μSA	36,089	−3.80%	37,515	−5.18%	39,566
18	Minden, LA μSA	34,948	−5.46%	36,967	−10.29%	41,207
19	Natchez, MS-LA μSA (LA)	17,836	−4.55%	18,687	−10.25%	20,822
	Natchez, MS-LA μSA	54,722	−1.38%	55,485	−8.81%	60,845

== See also ==
- Geography of Louisiana
  - Demographics of Louisiana
