= Lake Charles–DeRidder combined statistical area =

Coordinates: 30°00′N 93°12′W

The Lake Area
- Combined Statistical Area
- Lake Charles–DeRidder, LA; Combined Statistical Area
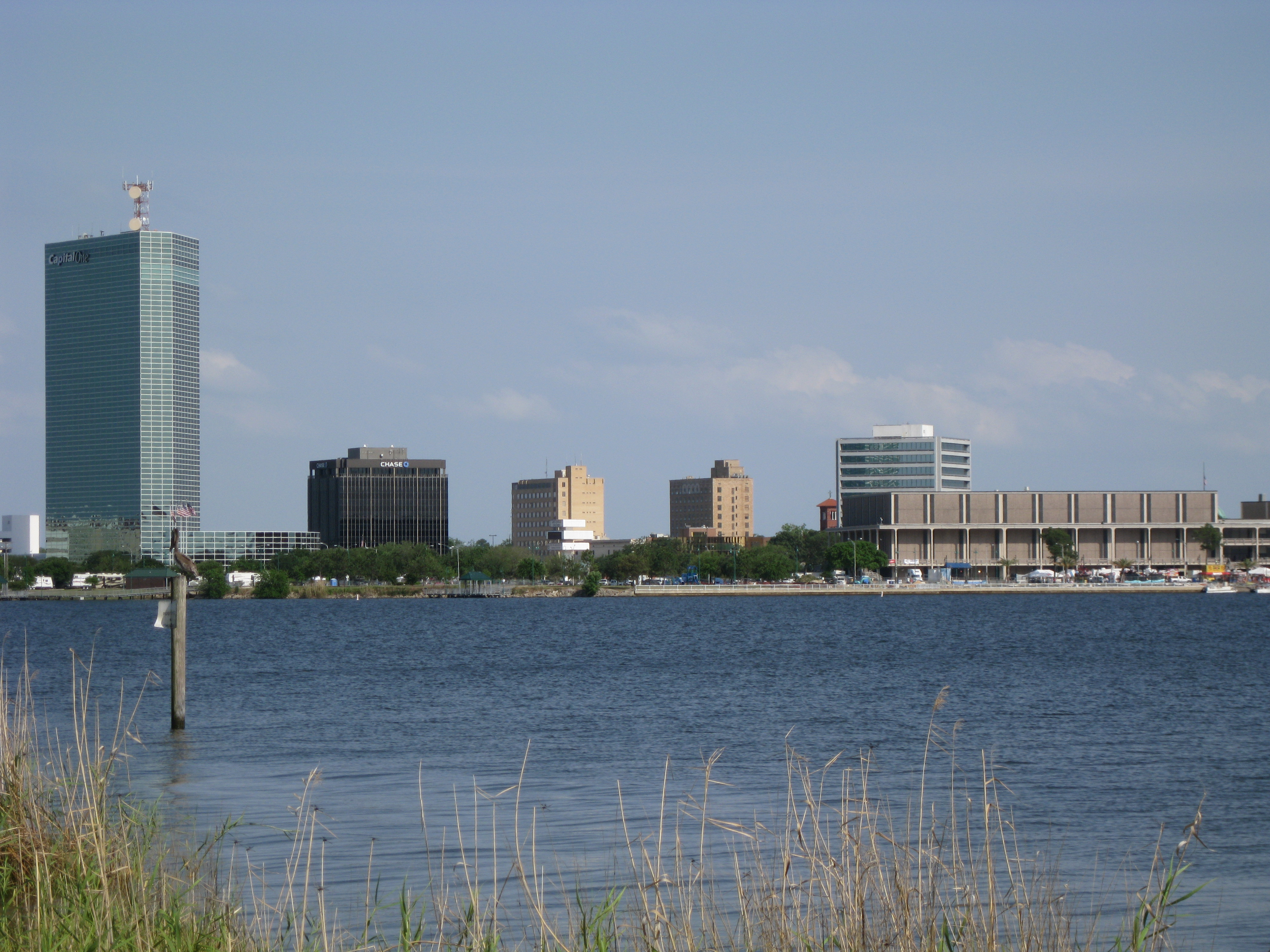
- Downtown Lake Charles
Interactive Map of Lake Charles–DeRidder, LA CSA
City of Lake Charles
Lake Charles, LA MSA
DeRidder, LA µSA
- Country: United States
- State: Louisiana
- Largest city: Lake Charles
- Other cities: Sulphur; Jennings; Westlake; DeRidder

Population (2020)
  - Total: 254,652
  - Estimate (2022): 239,346
  - Rank: US: 199th
- Time zone: UTC-6 (CST)
  - Summer (DST): UTC-5 (CDT)

The Lake Charles–DeRidder combined statistical area is made up of four parishes in southwestern Louisiana. The statistical area consists of the Lake Charles Metropolitan Statistical Area and the DeRidder Micropolitan Statistical Area. The largest principal city is Lake Charles, and the smaller principal city is Jennings. As of the 2010 census, the CSA had a population of 231,201. A July 1, 2019 estimate placed the population at 241,777.

== Parishes ==
- Beauregard
- Calcasieu
- Cameron
- Jefferson Davis

== Communities ==
=== Cities ===
- DeQuincy
- DeRidder
- Jennings
- Lake Charles (Principal city)
- Sulphur
- Westlake

=== Towns ===
- Elton
- Iowa
- Lake Arthur
- Vinton
- Welsh

=== Villages ===
- Fenton

=== Census-designated places ===
- Cameron
- Carlyss
- Hackberry
- Hayes
- Lacassine
- Moss Bluff
- Prien
- Roanoke

=== Unincorporated places ===
- Barnsdall
- Bell City
- Bellevue
- Big Lake
- Buller
- China
- Creole
- Edna
- Fontenot
- Foreman's Hall
- Gillis
- Grand Chenier
- Grand Lake
- Gravel Point
- Hathaway
- Holly Beach
- Johnson Bayou
- Lauderdale
- Mossville
- Niblett
- Panchoville
- Pine Island
- Raymond
- Silverwood
- Soileau
- St. Anne
- Starks
- Thornwell
- Topsy
- Verrett
- Walton
- Woodlawn

== Demographics ==
As of the census of 2000, there were 225,003 people, 83,865 households, and 60,291 families residing within the CSA. The racial makeup of the CSA was 75.47% White, 22.22% African American, 0.32% Native American, 0.57% Asian, 0.03% Pacific Islander, 0.40% from other races, and 0.99% from two or more races. Hispanic or Latino of any race were 1.33% of the population.

The median income for a household in the CSA was $32,447, and the median income for a family was $38,232. Males had a median income of $32,005 versus $19,724 for females. The per capita income for the CSA was $15,485.

== See also ==
- Louisiana census statistical areas
- List of cities, towns, and villages in Louisiana
- List of census-designated places in Louisiana
