= Lake Charles metropolitan area =

The Lake Area
- Metropolitan statistical area
- Lake Charles, LA metropolitan statistical area
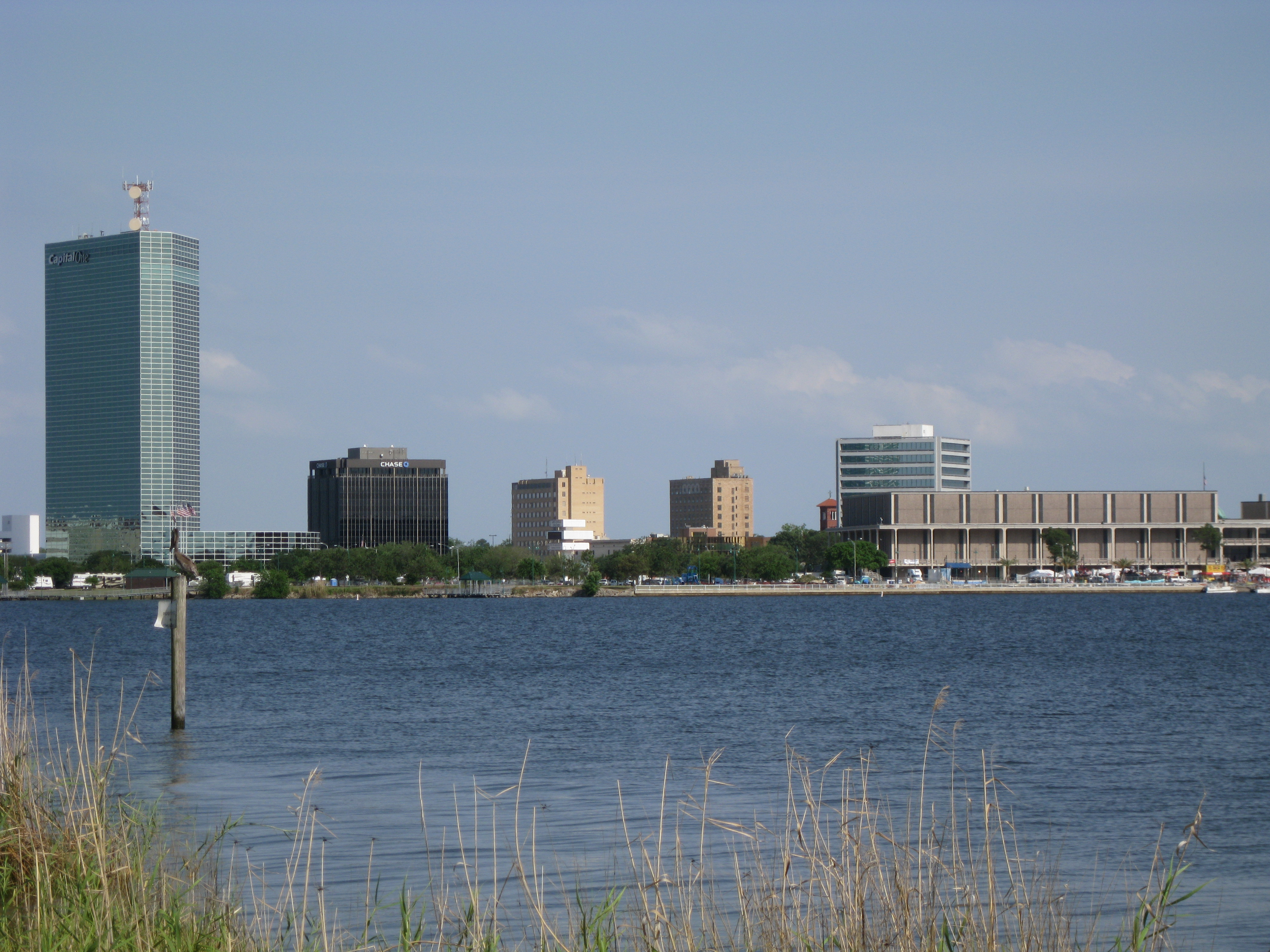
- Downtown Lake Charles
Interactive Map of Lake Charles–DeRidder, LA CSA
City of Lake Charles
Lake Charles, LA MSA
DeRidder, LA µSA
- Country: United States
- State: Louisiana
- Largest city: Lake Charles
- Other cities: Sulphur; Jennings; Westlake

Population (2020)
  - Total: 254,652
  - Estimate (2025): 244,655
  - Rank: 199th
- Time zone: UTC-6 (CST)
  - Summer (DST): UTC-5 (CDT)

The Lake Charles metropolitan statistical area is a metropolitan area in the Acadiana region of southwest Louisiana that covers three parishes—Calcasieu, Cameron, and Jefferson Davis. According to a 2025 census estimate, the MSA had a population of 244,655. It is also part of the larger Lake Charles–DeRidder combined statistical area which had a population of 281,328 in 2025. The Lake Charles MSA also shares borders with the Lafayette metropolitan area to the east, the Fort Polk South micropolitan area to the north, and the Beaumont–Port Arthur metropolitan area to the west. Metropolitan Lake Charles, the principal city, is commonly referred to as the Lake Area.

== Parishes ==
| Parish | Seat | 2025 estimate | 2020 Census | Change | Area | Density |
|---|---|---|---|---|---|---|
| Calcasieu | Lake Charles | 208,466 | 216,785 | −3.84% | 1,064 sq mi (2,760 km^{2}) | 196/sq mi (76/km^{2}) |
| Jefferson Davis | Jennings | 31,471 | 32,250 | −2.42% | 651 sq mi (1,690 km^{2}) | 48/sq mi (19/km^{2}) |
| Cameron | Cameron | 4,718 | 5,617 | −16.00% | 1,285 sq mi (3,330 km^{2}) | 4/sq mi (1/km^{2}) |
| Total | | 244,655 | 254,652 | −3.93% | 3,000 sq mi (7,800 km^{2}) | 82/sq mi (31/km^{2}) |

== Communities ==
=== Cities ===
- DeQuincy
- Lake Charles (principal city)
- Jennings
- Sulphur
- Westlake

=== Towns ===
- Iowa
- Vinton

=== Unincorporated areas ===
==== Census-designated places ====
- Cameron
- Carlyss
- Hackberry
- Moss Bluff
- Prien

==== Other communities ====
- Bell City
- Big Lake
- Creole
- Gillis
- Grand Chenier
- Grand Lake
- Hayes
- Holly Beach
- Johnson Bayou
- Mossville
- Starks

== Demographics ==
By 2021, its population was 208,680 according to statistics from the American Community Survey. In 2021, the racial and ethnic makeup was an estimated 67% non-Hispanic white, 24% African American or Black, 1% Asian, 3% two or more races, and 4% Hispanic or Latino of any race. At the 2000 census, its racial makeup was 74.63% White, 22.94% African American, 0.31% Native American, 0.63% Asian, 0.03% Pacific Islander, 0.44% from other races, and 1.02% from two or more races. Hispanic or Latino of any race were 1.38% of the population.

In 2000, the median income for a household in the MSA was $34,802, and the median income for a family was $40,783. Males had a median income of $33,868 versus $20,252 for females. The per capita income for the MSA was $16,529. At the 2021 ACS census-estimates, its median household income increased to $58,736 with a per capita income of $30,000. Approximately 18.7% of the metropolitan population lived at or below the poverty line, with 24% of children under age 18 considered in poverty.

== Transportation ==
Interstate 10 intersects the metropolitan area with Houston, Texas and New Orleans. Interstate 210 loops around the city of Lake Charles, and U.S. Highway 90 runs parallel with Interstate 10; U.S. Highway 171 connects the area with Central and North Louisiana.

== See also ==
- Louisiana census statistical areas
- List of cities, towns, and villages in Louisiana
- List of census-designated places in Louisiana
