= Lafayette metropolitan area, Louisiana =

Lafayette Vermilionville
- Metropolitan statistical area
- Lafayette, LA metropolitan statistical area
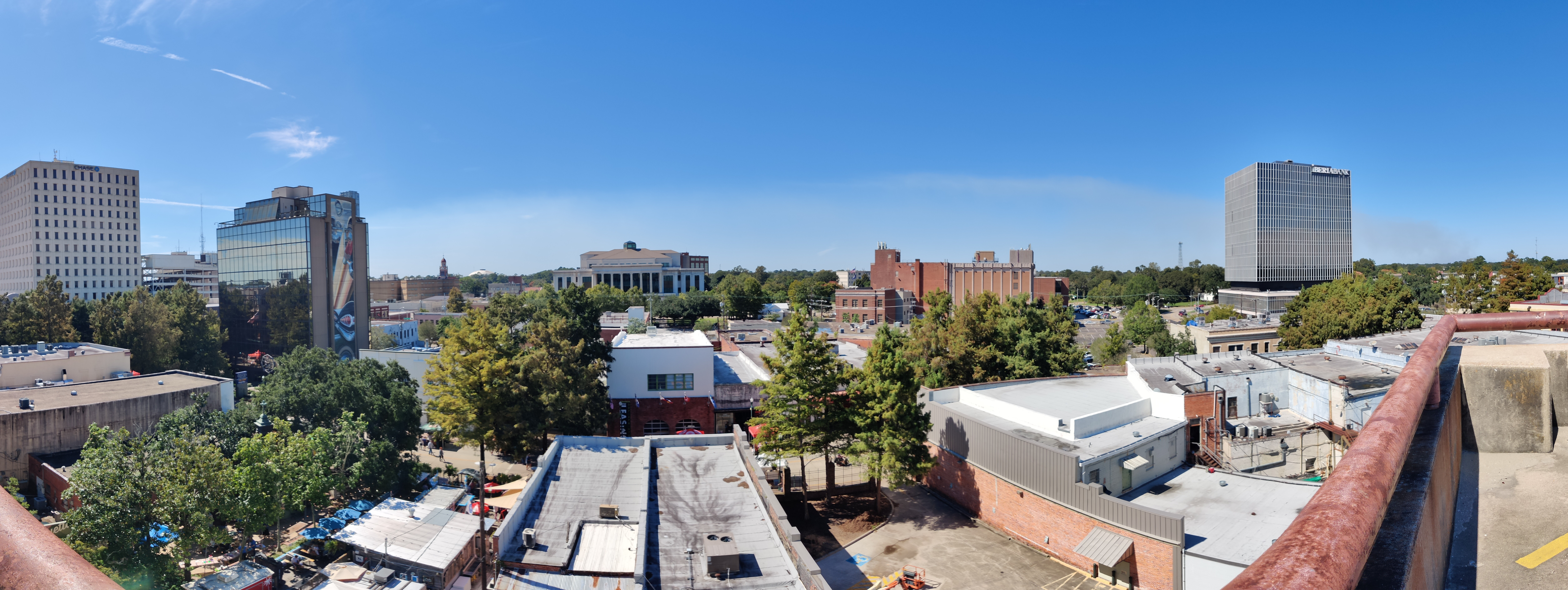
- Lafayette, Louisiana skyline, 2021

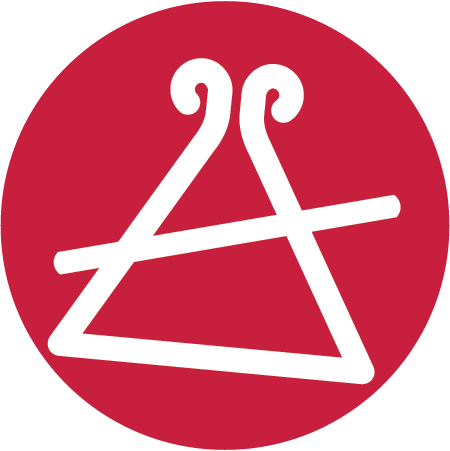
- Seal
- Nickname: Hub City
Map of Lafayette–New Iberia–Opelousas-Morgan City, LA CSA
City of Lafayette
Lafayette, LA MSA
Opelousas, LA µSA
New Iberia, LA µSA
- Country: United States
- State: Louisiana
- Principal city: Lafayette
- Other cities: Youngsville; Broussard; Opelousas; New Iberia

Area
  - Land: 3,841 sq mi (9,947 km^{2})

Population (2020)
  - Metro: 478,384

GDP
  - Metro: $24.996 billion (2022)
- Time zone: UTC-6 (CST)
  - Summer (DST): UTC-5 (CDT)
- Website: http://www.lafayettela.gov/

Lafayette, Vermilionville, or the Lafayette metropolitan statistical area per the U.S. Office of Management and Budget, is the third largest metropolitan statistical area in the U.S. state of Louisiana. Located in the south central Acadiana region, it covers five parishes. At the 2020 U.S. census, 478,384 people lived in the metropolitan area, making it the 116th most populous in the United States and one of Louisiana's fastest growing metropolises; in 2010, its population was 273,738 and it outpaced the Shreveport–Bossier City metropolitan area in 2015.

The approximately 3,408.5 square miles (8,828 km^{2}) metropolitan area centers on Lafayette Parish, which contains the city of Lafayette—the largest economic and cultural center of Acadiana—with a consolidated city-parish population of 244,390 in 2019; the city proper's population was 121,374 in 2020. Part of the larger Lafayette-Opelousas-Morgan City combined statistical area, it borders the Baton Rouge metropolitan area to the east, the Houma–Bayou Cane–Thibodaux metropolitan area to the southeast, and the Lake Charles metropolitan area to the west.

As of 2020, the metropolitan statistical area is home to Amazon, IberiaBank (now merged with First Horizon Bank), Rouses Market, Albertsons, Petroleum Helicopters International, and other statewide and international corporations generating a gross domestic product of over 24.9 billion dollars as of 2022. The Lafayette metropolitan area is one of the most predominantly-Catholic metropolises in the Southern United States, and home to the University of Louisiana at Lafayette. It is also home to a growing lesbian, gay, bisexual and transgender population.

== Geography ==
The Lafayette metropolitan area covers approximately 3,408.5 square miles (8,828 km^{2}) in the region of Acadiana in Louisiana. If it were a U.S. state or territory, it would be larger than Delaware and the Northern Mariana Islands. The United States Office of Management and Budget defines Metropolitan Lafayette as initially covering Lafayette and Saint Martin parishes; Acadia, Iberia, and Vermilion parishes were added to the metropolis in 2013. The larger combined statistical area adds St. Landry Parish and St. Mary Parish.

Located along the Gulf Coast of the United States, it borders the Lake Charles metropolitan area, and is located south of the Alexandria metropolitan area, and west of Greater New Orleans and Greater Baton Rouge. Communities within the Lafayette area lie at a low elevation above sea level, though some portions extend to nearly 50 feet (15 m) above sea level.

== Communities ==
- Abbeville
- Arnaudville (partial)
- Breaux Bridge
- Broussard
- Carencro
- Cecilia
- Coteau Holmes (unincorporated)
- Crowley
- Delcambre
- Duson
- Eunice
- Erath
- Gueydan
- Henderson
- Jeanerette
- Kaplan
- Lafayette (principal city)
- Loreauville
- Maurice
- Milton (unincorporated)
- Morgan City (partial)
- New Iberia
- Opelousas
- Parks
- Rayne
- St. Martinville
- Scott
- Youngsville

== Demographics ==
In 2010, the U.S. Census Bureau reported there were 273,738 people, 89,536 households, and 61,826 families residing within metropolitan Lafayette. From 2010 to 2015, the Lafayette metropolitan area outpaced the Shreveport–Bossier City metropolitan area in North Louisiana by population, becoming the third largest metropolitan area in the state. In 2019, the Lafayette metropolitan area's population began a period of stagnation and slight decline. At the publication of the 2020 United States census, its metropolitan population was 478,384.

According to the 2010 census, the metropolitan racial makeup was 71.86% White, 25.46% African American, 0.28% Native American, 1.05% Asian, 0.02% Pacific Islander, 0.45% from other races, and 0.87% from two or more races; Hispanics or Latinos of any race were 1.56% of the population. At the 2021 American Community Survey's 1-year estimates, the racial and ethnic makeup for the metropolis was 66% White, 25% Black and African American, 0% Native American, 2% Asian, 4% from two or more races, and 4% Hispanic or Latino American of any race.

Parish	Seat	2025 estimate	2020 Census	Change	Land area	Density
Lafayette	Lafayette	257,949	241,753	+6.70%	269 sq mi (700 km^{2})	959/sq mi (370/km^{2})
Vermilion	Abbeville	57,671	57,359	+0.54%	1,173 sq mi (3,040 km^{2})	49/sq mi (19/km^{2})
Acadia	Crowley	57,032	57,576	−0.94%	655 sq mi (1,700 km^{2})	87/sq mi (34/km^{2})
St. Martin	St. Martinville	51,106	51,767	−1.28%	738 sq mi (1,910 km^{2})	69/sq mi (27/km^{2})
Total		423,758	408,455	+3.75%	2,835 sq mi (7,340 km^{2})	149/sq mi (58/km^{2})

== Economy ==
The city and parish of Lafayette are the economic centers for Acadiana and the metropolitan region. Having been or currently economically established by Albertsons, Amazon, Brookshire Grocery Company, CGI, First Horizon Bank, JP Morgan Chase, LUSFiber, the Ochsner Health System, Petroleum Helicopters International, Perficient, and Rouses Markets, the area is also economically stimulated by the University of Louisiana at Lafayette and South Louisiana Community College.

== Transportation ==
Lafayette Regional Airport—located on U.S. Highway 90 (future Interstate 49), on the southeast side of the city of Lafayette with daily scheduled passenger airline services nonstop to Atlanta, Dallas/Fort Worth, Houston and effective April 2, 2021 to Charlotte—is the primary airport for the metropolitan area and Acadiana. Charter services also depart Lafayette Regional as well as helicopter flights and cargo jets. A new airline passenger terminal at the Lafayette airport opened on January 20, 2022.

Alongside its aerial transportation methods, Interstate 10 and Interstate 49 are the primary highways, with a passenger rail. The Amtrak Sunset Limited offers service three days a week from New Orleans and Los Angeles, California with selected stops in Louisiana, Texas, New Mexico, Arizona and California. Connections are available in New Orleans to Chicago and to the East Coast via Atlanta. Service eastward to Orlando, Florida remains suspended in the aftermath of Hurricane Katrina. Greyhound also operates a station downtown on Lee Avenue with destinations east and west on I-10, north on I-49 and southeast on U.S. Hwy 90. The Lafayette Transit System (formerly City of Lafayette Transit (COLT)) provides bus service; public transportation is provided only within Lafayette's city limits.

U.S. Route 90 (co-signed with Evangeline Thruway, Mudd Avenue and Cameron Street within the city limits) and U.S. Route 167 (co-signed with I-49, Evangeline Thruway and Johnston Street). Ambassador Caffery Parkway, named for Jefferson Caffery, serves as a partial loop connecting I-10 at Exit 100 on the west and U.S. 90 on the south. Other arterial roads include Verot School Road (LA 339), West Congress Street, Kaliste Saloom Road (LA 3095), Ridge Road, Carmel Drive/Breaux Bridge Highway (LA 94), University Avenue (LA 182), Pinhook Road (LA 182), Camellia Boulevard, Guilbeau Road, Moss Street, Willow Street, Louisiana Avenue, Pont Des Mouton Road, Eraste Landry Road, and South College Road.

== See also ==
- Louisiana census statistical areas
- List of cities, towns, and villages in Louisiana
- List of census-designated places in Louisiana
