= New Orleans–Metairie–Slidell combined statistical area =

Metropolitan area in Louisiana and Mississippi

Coordinates: 30°00′N 89°48′W

Location of the New Orleans–Metairie–Slidell CSA and its components: New Orleans–Metairie MSA Slidell–Mandeville–Covington, MSA Bogalusa μSA Picayune μSA Louisiana Mississippi

The New Orleans–Metairie–Slidell combined statistical area is made up of nine parishes in southeastern Louisiana and one county in Mississippi. The statistical area consists of the New Orleans metropolitan statistical area (MSA), Slidell–Mandeville–Covington, LA MSA, Picayune micropolitan statistical area (μSA), and the Bogalusa μSA. As of the 2020 census, the CSA had a population of 1,373,453. In 2023, the Office of Management and Budget updated the Core Based Statistical Areas, removing St. Tammany Parish from the New Orleans–Metairie MSA to create the Slidell–Mandeville–Covington MSA.

The area was severely affected by Hurricane Katrina on August 29, 2005.

== Parishes and counties ==
Louisiana

- Jefferson
- Orleans
- Plaquemines
- St. Bernard
- St. Charles
- St. James
- St. John the Baptist
- St. Tammany
- Washington
- Tangipahoa

Mississippi

- Pearl River

== Communities ==
=== Places with more than 50,000 inhabitants ===
- New Orleans (Principal city)
- Kenner
- Metairie (Principal city and census-designated place)

=== Places with 10,000 to 50,000 inhabitants ===
- Belle Chasse
- Bogalusa (Principal city)
- Chalmette
- Covington (Principal city)
- Destrehan
- Estelle
- Gretna
- Harvey
- Jefferson
- LaPlace
- Luling
- Mandeville (Principal city)
- Marrero
- Meraux
- Picayune, Mississippi (Principal city)
- River Ridge
- Slidell (Principal city)
- Terrytown
- Timberlane
- Westwego
- Woodmere
- Waggaman

=== Places with less than 10,000 inhabitants ===
- Abita Springs
- Ama
- Angie
- Arabi
- Avondale
- Barataria
- Bayou Gauche
- Boothville
- Boutte
- Bridge City
- Buras
- Carriere, Mississippi
- Des Allemands
- Eden Isle
- Edgard
- Elmwood
- Empire
- Franklinton
- Folsom
- Garyville
- Grand Isle
- Hahnville
- Harahan
- Hide-A-Way Lake, Mississippi
- Jean Lafitte
- Killona
- Lacombe
- Lafitte
- Lumberton, Mississippi
- Madisonville
- McNeill, Mississippi
- Montz
- New Sarpy
- Nicholson, Mississippi
- Norco
- Paradis
- Pearl River
- Pleasure Bend
- Pointe a la Hache
- Poplarville, Mississippi
- Port Sulphur
- Poydras
- Reserve
- Saint Rose
- Sun
- Triumph
- Varnado
- Venice
- Violet
- Wallace

== Demographics ==
As of the census of 2000, there were 1,360,436 people, 515,054 households, and 347,173 families residing within the CSA. The racial makeup of the CSA was 57.7% White, 37.2% African American, 0.4% Native American, 2.1% Asian, <0.1% Pacific Islander, 1.2% from other races, and 1.4% from two or more races. Hispanic or Latino of any race were 4.3% of the population.

The median income for a household in the CSA was $37,053, and the median income for a family was $42,860. Males had a median income of $35,659 versus $23,150 for females. The per capita income for the CSA was $17,474.

== See also ==
- Louisiana census statistical areas
- List of cities, towns, and villages in Louisiana
- List of census-designated places in Louisiana
- Pearl River County, Mississippi
