= Monroe–Ruston combined statistical area =

Coordinates: 32°42′N 92°12′W

Monroe Metropolitan Area
- Combined Statistical Area
- Monroe–Ruston, LA Combined Statistical Area
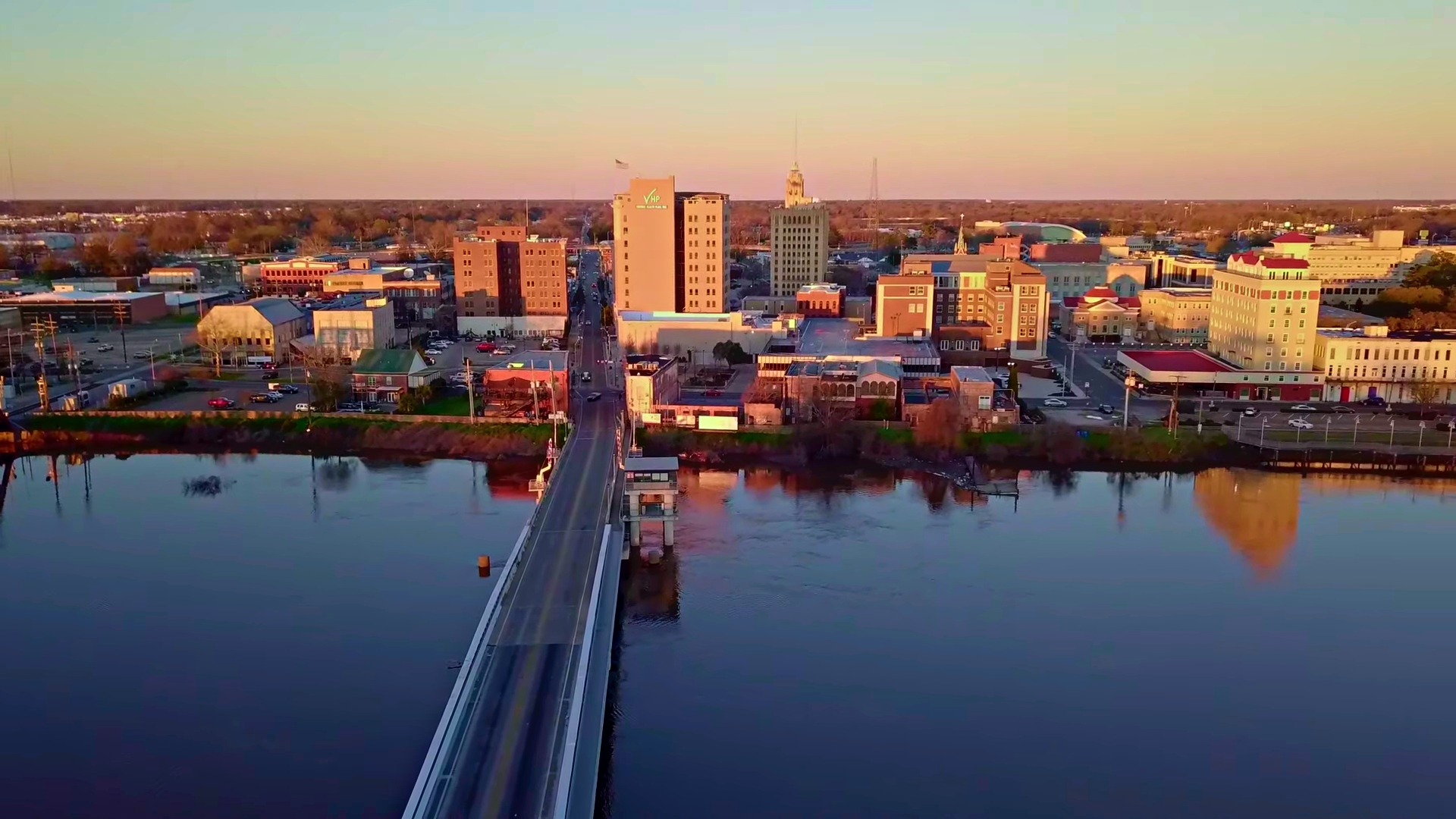
- Downtown Monroe
Interactive Map of Monroe–Ruston, LA CSA
City of Monroe
Monroe, LA MSA
Ruston, LA µSA
- Country: United States
- State: Louisiana
- Principal city: Monroe
- Other cities: West Monroe; Bastrop; Farmerville; Ruston
- Time zone: UTC-6 (CST)
  - Summer (DST): UTC-5 (CDT)
- River: Ouachita River

The Monroe–Ruston Combined Statistical Area is made up of five parishes in northern Louisiana. The statistical area consists of the Monroe Metropolitan Statistical Area and the Ruston Micropolitan Statistical Area. As of the 2010 census, the CSA had a population of 251,155.

== Parishes ==
- Lincoln Parish
- Morehouse Parish
- Ouachita Parish
- Richland Parish
- Union Parish

== Communities ==
=== Places with more than 50,000 people ===
- Monroe (Principal city)

=== Places with 10,000 to 25,000 people ===
- Ruston (Principal city)
- Bastrop (Principal city)
- West Monroe

=== Places with 5,000 to 10,000 people ===
- Grambling
- Brownsville–Bawcomville
- Claiborne

=== Places with fewer than 5,000 people ===
- Bernice
- Bonita
- Collinston
- Downsville
- Farmerville
- Lillie
- Marion
- Mer Rouge
- Oak Ridge
- Richwood
- Spearsville
- Sterlington
- Swartz

== Demographics ==
As of the census of 2000, there were 201,074 people, 75,455 households, and 53,051 families residing within the CSA. The racial makeup of the CSA was 63.74% White, 34.49% African American, 0.21% Native American, 0.53% Asian, 0.02% Pacific Islander, 0.40% from other races, and 0.61% from two or more races. Hispanic or Latino of any race were 1.21% of the population.

The median income for a household in the CSA was $28,744, and the median income for a family was $35,866. Males had a median income of $31,165 versus $20,894 for females. The per capita income for the CSA was $15,033.

== See also ==
- Louisiana census statistical areas
- List of cities, towns, and villages in Louisiana
- List of census-designated places in Louisiana
