= Port St. Lucie metropolitan area =

Statistical area in Florida, US

- Metropolitan Statistical Area
- Port St. Lucie, FL MSA
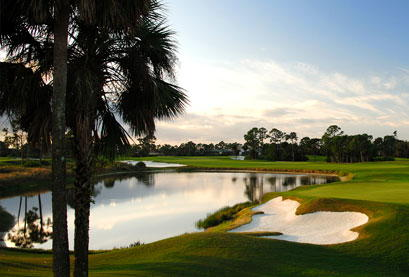
- PGA Golf Club in Port St. Lucie
- Interactive map of Port St. Lucie metropolitan area
- Coordinates: 27°24′N 80°35′W
- Country: United States
- State: Florida
- Largest city: Port St. Lucie
- Other cities: Fort Pierce; Stuart

Population (2025 Estimate)
  - Total: 556,336
- Time zone: UTC−5 (EST)
  - Summer (DST): UTC−4 (EDT)

The Port St. Lucie, FL Metropolitan Statistical Area (MSA) includes St. Lucie and Martin counties in the Treasure Coast region of Florida.

The MSA was defined by the Office of Management and Budget with its current composition in 1983 as the Ft. Pierce, FL MSA, with Fort Pierce as the principal city. The name was changed to Ft. Pierce-Port St. Lucie, FL MSA in 1992, with the addition of Port St. Lucie as a principal city. The name of the MSA was changed to Port St. Lucie-Ft. Pierce, FL MSA in 2003, and to Port St. Lucie, FL MSA in 2006, with the removal of Fort Pierce as a principal city. The Port St. Lucie MSA is included in the Miami-Port St. Lucie-Fort Lauderdale, FL Combined Statistical Area.

The Port St. Lucie, FL MSA was included, together with the Sebastian-Vero Beach, FL MSA (consisting of Indian River County), in the Port St. Lucie-Sebastian-Vero Beach Combined Statistical Area (CSA), in December 2006. In February 2013, the Office of Management and Budget issued a bulletin that defined the Miami-Fort Lauderdale-Port St. Lucie CSA, which includes the Miami-Fort Lauderdale-West Palm Beach MSA, Okeechobee Micropolitan Statistical Area (μSA), Port St. Lucie MSA, and Sebastian-Vero Beach MSA. The Port St. Lucie-Sebastian-Vero Beach CSA was not listed in that bulletin, as its two components had been moved to the Miami-Fort Lauderdale-Port St. Lucie CSA.

== Population ==
The Port St. Lucie MSA has an area of 1,115.4 square miles (2,889 km^{2}). The population was 319,426 in 2000 and 424,107 in 2010. The Census Bureau's 2020 Report indicated the combined populations for Martin and St. Lucie counties, thus the Port St. Lucie metro area, was 487,657. as of 2021 the Census Bureau estimated the population of the MSA to be 503,521.

As of May 2021 the U.S. Bureau of Labor Statistics estimated that there were 149,200 people employed in the metropolitan area, at a median hourly wage of $17.76, a mean hourly wage of $22.94, and a mean annual wage of $47,710.

County	Seat	2025 estimate	2020 Census	Change	Land are	Density
Martin	Stuart	166,272	158,431	+4.95%	543 sq mi (1,410 km^{2})	306/sq mi (118/km^{2})
St. Lucie	Fort Pierce	402,449	329,226	+22.24%	572 sq mi (1,480 km^{2})	704/sq mi (272/km^{2})
Total		568,721	487,657	+16.62%	1,115 sq mi (2,890 km^{2})	510/sq mi (197/km^{2})
