= Lafayette–New Iberia–Opelousas combined statistical area =

Coordinates: 30°00′N 91°54′W

Lafayette metropolitan area Vermilionville
- Combined Statistical Area
- Lafayette–New Iberia–Opelousas, La. Combined Statistical Area
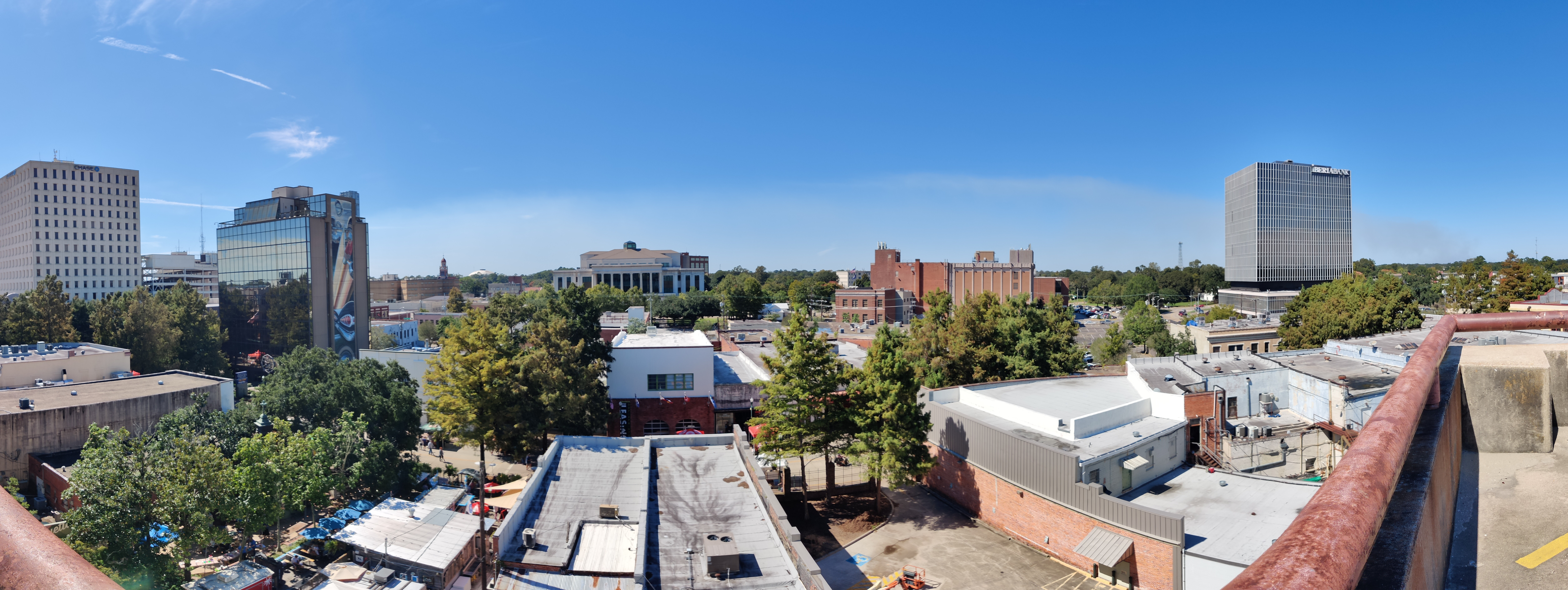
- Lafayette Skyline (2021)

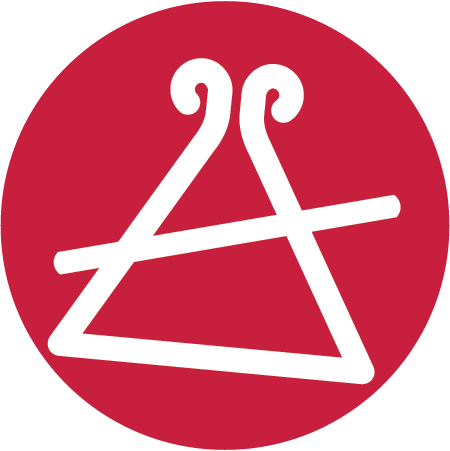
- Seal
- Nickname: Hub City
Map of Lafayette–New Iberia–Opelousas, LA CSA
City of Lafayette
Lafayette, LA MSA
Opelousas, LA µSA
New Iberia, LA µSA
- Country: United States
- State: Louisiana
- Principal city: Lafayette
- Other cities: Youngsville; Broussard; Opelousas; New Iberia
- Time zone: UTC-6 (CST)
  - Summer (DST): UTC-5 (CDT)
- Website: http://www.lafayettela.gov/

The Lafayette–New Iberia–Opelousas combined statistical area is made up of six parishes in the Acadiana region of southern Louisiana. The statistical area consists of the Lafayette Metropolitan Statistical Area (MSA) and two micropolitical statistical areas (μSAs) – New Iberia, Louisiana Micropolitan Statistical Area, and Opelousas, Louisiana Micropolitical Statistical Area. The region consists of seven parishes: Acadia, Iberia, Lafayette, St. Landry, St. Martin, and Vermilion Parishes. As of the 2010 census, the CSA had a population of 604,784 (though a 2015 estimate placed the population at 627,146).

The CSA is home to a large Cajun population and is also known as the "Cajun heartland".

== Demographics ==
As of the census of 2010, there were 550,134 people, 188,219 households, and 134,322 families residing within the CSA. The racial makeup of the CSA was 70.42% White, 27.07% African American, 0.25% Native American, 1.01% Asian, 0.02% Pacific Islander, 0.40% from other races, and 0.84% from two or more races. Hispanic or Latino of any race were 1.35% of the population. Of the total population over the age of 5, 83.4% (419,800) spoke English and 12.7% (64,001) spoke French (including Cajun French and Louisiana Creole French).

The median income for a household in the CSA was $29,577, and the median income for a family was $35,717. Males had a median income of $31,564 versus $18,942 for females. The per capita income for the CSA was $14,467.

== Communities ==
=== Places with 20,000 people or more ===
- Lafayette (principal city)
- New Iberia
- Opelousas

=== Places with 10,000 to 19,999 people ===
- Abbeville
- Eunice
- Crowley

=== Places with 2,500 to 9,999 people ===
- Breaux Bridge
- Broussard
- Butte La Rose
- Carencro
- Church Point
- Jeanerette
- Kaplan
- Rayne
- Scott
- St. Martinville
- Youngsville

=== Places with fewer than 2,500 people ===
- Arnaudville
- Basile (mostly located in Evangeline Parish with small southern portion located in Acadia Parish)
- Branch
- Cade
- Catahoula
- Cankton
- Cecilia
- Delcambre
- Duson
- Erath
- Estherwood
- Grand Coteau
- Gueydan
- Henderson
- Iota
- Krotz Springs
- Lawtell
- Leonville
- Loreauville
- Lydia
- Maurice
- Melville
- Mermentau
- Milton
- Morse
- Palmetto
- Parks
- Port Barre
- Sunset
- Washington

== See also ==
- Louisiana census statistical areas
- List of cities, towns, and villages in Louisiana
- List of census-designated places in Louisiana
