= Combined statistical area =

Statistical region of the United States

Combined statistical area (CSA) is a United States Office of Management and Budget (OMB) term for a combination of adjacent metropolitan (MSA) and micropolitan statistical areas (μSA) across the 50 U.S. states and the territory of Puerto Rico that can demonstrate economic or social linkage. CSAs were first designated in 2003. OMB defines a CSA by various combinations of adjacent metropolitan and micropolitan areas with economic ties measured by commuting patterns. CSAs retain their own designations as metropolitan or micropolitan statistical areas in their respective larger combined statistical areas.

The primary distinguishing factor between a CSA and an MSA/μSA is that the social and economic ties between the individual MSAs/μSAs within a CSA are at lower levels than those between the counties within an MSA. CSAs represent multiple metropolitan or micropolitan areas that have an employment interchange of at least 15% (% commuting from A to B plus % commuting from B to A). CSAs often represent regions with overlapping labor and media markets.

As of 2023, there are 184 combined statistical areas across the United States, including three in the territory of Puerto Rico.

== United States ==
Location of the 20 largest CSAs in the United States, based on U.S. Census Bureau estimates for July 1, 2025

An enlargeable map of the 184 combined statistical areas (CSAs) of the United States (181) and Puerto Rico (3) as defined in 2023

This table lists the 181 combined statistical areas (CSAs) of the United States with the following information:

1. The CSA rank by population as of July 1, 2025, as estimated by the U.S. Census Bureau
2. The CSA name as designated by the United States Office of Management and Budget
3. The CSA population as of July 1, 2025, as estimated by the United States Census Bureau
4. The CSA population as of April 1, 2020, as enumerated by the 2020 United States census (Note: Populations retroactively adjusted to account for new CSA delineations as redefined in 2023. This number reflects what the 2020 Census would have shown the population to be had the current delineated boundaries been in effect at the time of the 2020 Census.)
5. The percent CSA population change from April 1, 2020, to July 1, 2025
6. The core-based statistical areas (CBSAs) that constitute the CSA

Metropolitan statistical areas that are not also combined with other MSAs or CBSAs are not listed below.

The 181 combined statistical areas of the United States of America
Combined statistical area	2025 estimate	2020 census	Change	Constituent core-based statistical areas
New York–Newark, NY-NJ-CT-PA CSA	22,535,017	22,431,833	+0.46%	New York–Newark–Jersey City, NY-NJ MSA; Bridgeport–Stamford–Danbury, CT MSA; Kiryas Joel–Poughkeepsie–Newburgh, NY MSA; Trenton–Princeton, NJ MSA; Kingston, NY MSA; Monticello, NY μSA; Hemlock Farms, PA μSA
Los Angeles–Long Beach, CA CSA	18,444,299	18,644,680	−1.07%	Los Angeles–Long Beach–Anaheim, CA MSA; Riverside–San Bernardino–Ontario, CA MSA; Oxnard–Thousand Oaks–Ventura, CA MSA
Washington–Baltimore–Arlington, DC-MD-VA-WV-PA CSA	10,274,894	10,028,331	+2.46%	Washington–Arlington–Alexandria, DC-VA-MD-WV MSA; Baltimore–Columbia–Towson, MD MSA; Hagerstown–Martinsburg MD-WV MSA; Lexington Park, MD MSA; Chambersburg, PA MSA; Winchester, VA-WV MSA; Easton, MD μSA; Lake of the Woods, VA μSA; Cambridge, MD μSA
Chicago–Naperville, IL-IN-WI CSA	9,965,292	9,986,960	−0.22%	Chicago–Naperville–Elgin, IL-IN MSA; Kenosha, WI MSA; Ottawa, IL μSA; Michigan City–La Porte, IN MSA; Kankakee, IL MSA
San Jose–San Francisco–Oakland, CA CSA	9,140,485	9,225,160	−0.92%	San Francisco–Oakland–Fremont, CA MSA; San Jose–Sunnyvale–Santa Clara, CA MSA; Stockton–Lodi, CA MSA; Modesto, CA MSA; Vallejo, CA MSA; Merced, CA MSA; Santa Cruz–Watsonville, CA MSA; Napa, CA MSA
Dallas–Fort Worth, TX-OK CSA	9,051,994	8,157,895	+10.96%	Dallas–Fort Worth–Arlington, TX MSA; Sherman–Denison, TX MSA; Athens, TX μSA; Granbury, TX μSA; Corsicana, TX μSA; Durant, OK μSA; Gainesville, TX μSA; Sulphur Springs, TX μSA; Bonham, TX μSA; Mineral Wells, TX μSA
Boston–Worcester–Providence, MA-RI-NH CSA	8,521,063	8,349,768	+2.05%	Boston–Cambridge–Newton, MA-NH MSA; Providence–Warwick, RI-MA MSA; Worcester, MA MSA; Manchester–Nashua, NH MSA; Barnstable Town, MA MSA; Concord, NH μSA; Laconia, NH μSA
Houston–Pasadena, TX CSA	8,105,280	7,339,672	+10.43%	Houston–Pasadena–The Woodlands, TX MSA; Huntsville, TX μSA; El Campo, TX μSA; Bay City, TX μSA; Brenham, TX μSA
Philadelphia–Reading–Camden, PA-NJ-DE-MD CSA	7,493,171	7,379,700	+1.54%	Philadelphia–Camden–Wilmington, PA-NJ-DE-MD MSA; Reading, PA MSA; Atlantic City–Hammonton, NJ MSA; Dover, DE MSA; Vineland, NJ MSA
Atlanta–Athens-Clarke County–Sandy Springs, GA-AL CSA	7,426,769	6,976,171	+6.46%	Atlanta–Sandy Springs–Roswell, GA MSA; Athens-Clarke County, GA MSA; Gainesville, GA MSA; LaGrange, GA-AL μSA; Rome, GA MSA; Jefferson, GA μSA; Calhoun, GA μSA; Cornelia, GA μSA; Cedartown, GA μSA; Thomaston, GA μSA
Miami–Port St. Lucie–Fort Lauderdale, FL CSA	7,255,606	6,908,296	+5.03%	Miami–Fort Lauderdale–West Palm Beach, FL MSA; Port St. Lucie, FL MSA; Sebastian–Vero Beach–West Vero Corridor, FL MSA; Key West–Key Largo, FL μSA; Okeechobee, FL μSA
Detroit–Warren–Ann Arbor, MI CSA	5,416,003	5,424,742	−0.16%	Detroit–Warren–Dearborn, MI MSA; Flint, MI MSA; Ann Arbor, MI MSA; Monroe, MI MSA; Adrian, MI μSA
Phoenix–Mesa, AZ CSA	5,282,739	4,899,104	+7.83%	Phoenix–Mesa–Chandler, AZ MSA; Payson, AZ μSA
Seattle–Tacoma, WA CSA	5,127,377	4,953,421	+3.51%	Seattle–Tacoma–Bellevue, WA MSA; Olympia–Lacey–Tumwater, WA MSA; Bremerton–Silverdale–Port Orchard, WA MSA; Mount Vernon–Anacortes, WA MSA; Oak Harbor, WA μSA; Centralia, WA μSA; Shelton, WA μSA
Orlando–Lakeland–Deltona, FL CSA	4,737,167	4,197,095	+12.87%	Orlando–Kissimmee–Sanford, FL MSA; Lakeland–Winter Haven, FL MSA; Deltona–Daytona Beach–Ormond Beach, FL MSA; Wildwood–The Villages, FL MSA
Minneapolis–St. Paul, MN-WI CSA	4,188,378	4,078,788	+2.69%	Minneapolis–St. Paul–Bloomington, MN-WI MSA; St. Cloud, MN MSA; Faribault–Northfield, MN μSA; Red Wing, MN μSA; Owatonna, MN μSA; Hutchinson, MN μSA
Denver–Aurora–Greeley, CO CSA	3,799,023	3,623,560	+4.84%	Denver–Aurora–Centennial, CO MSA; Boulder, CO MSA; Greeley, CO MSA
Cleveland–Akron–Canton, OH CSA	3,743,802	3,769,834	−0.69%	Cleveland, OH MSA; Akron, OH MSA; Canton–Massillon, OH MSA; Wooster, OH μSA; Sandusky, OH MSA; New Philadelphia–Dover, OH μSA; Fremont, OH μSA; Norwalk, OH μSA; Coshocton, OH μSA
Charlotte–Concord, NC-SC CSA	3,533,073	3,232,206	+9.31%	Charlotte–Concord–Gastonia, NC-SC MSA; Hickory–Lenoir–Morganton, NC MSA; Shelby–Kings Mountain, NC μSA; Albemarle, NC μSA; Marion, NC μSA
Portland–Vancouver–Salem, OR-WA CSA	3,333,552	3,280,736	+1.61%	Portland–Vancouver–Hillsboro, OR-WA MSA; Salem, OR MSA; Albany, OR MSA; Longview–Kelso, WA MSA; Corvallis, OR MSA
St. Louis–St. Charles–Farmington, MO-IL CSA	2,918,612	2,924,904	−0.22%	St. Louis, MO-IL MSA; Farmington, MO μSA; Centralia, IL μSA
Salt Lake City–Provo–Orem, UT-ID CSA	2,906,647	2,705,693	+7.43%	Salt Lake City–Murray, UT MSA; Provo–Orem–Lehi, UT MSA; Ogden, UT MSA; Heber, UT μSA; Brigham City, UT-ID μSA
San Antonio–New Braunfels–Kerrville, TX CSA	2,895,704	2,637,466	+9.79%	San Antonio–New Braunfels, TX MSA; Kerrville, TX μSA; Fredericksburg, TX μSA
Sacramento–Roseville, CA CSA	2,766,663	2,680,831	+3.20%	Sacramento–Roseville–Folsom, CA MSA; Yuba City, CA MSA; Truckee–Grass Valley, CA μSA
Pittsburgh–Weirton–Steubenville, PA-OH-WV CSA	2,725,198	2,767,801	−1.54%	Pittsburgh, PA MSA; Weirton–Steubenville, WV-OH MSA; Hermitage, PA μSA; Indiana, PA μSA
Indianapolis–Carmel–Muncie, IN CSA	2,722,834	2,599,860	+4.73%	Indianapolis–Carmel–Greenwood, IN MSA; Muncie, IN MSA; Kokomo, IN MSA; Columbus, IN MSA; New Castle, IN μSA; Seymour, IN μSA; Crawfordsville, IN μSA; Greencastle, IN μSA; Peru, IN μSA; Greensburg, IN μSA
Columbus–Marion–Zanesville, OH CSA	2,711,018	2,606,479	+4.01%	Columbus, OH MSA; Zanesville, OH μSA; Chillicothe, OH μSA; Marion, OH μSA; Mount Vernon, OH μSA; Athens, OH μSA; Bellefontaine, OH μSA; Cambridge, OH μSA; Washington Court House, OH μSA
New Haven–Hartford–Waterbury, CT CSA	2,710,317	2,659,617	+1.91%	Hartford–West Hartford–East Hartford, CT MSA; New Haven, CT MSA; Waterbury–Shelton, CT MSA; Norwich–New London–Willimantic, CT MSA; Torrington, CT μSA; Putnam, CT μSA
Kansas City–Overland Park–Kansas City, MO-KS CSA	2,609,913	2,528,644	+3.21%	Kansas City, MO-KS MSA; Lawrence, KS MSA; St. Joseph, MO-KS MSA; Warrensburg, MO μSA; Ottawa, KS μSA; Atchison, KS μSA
Raleigh–Durham–Cary, NC CSA	2,484,238	2,242,324	+10.79%	Raleigh–Cary, NC MSA; Durham–Chapel Hill, NC MSA; Anderson Creek, NC μSA; Sanford, NC μSA; Henderson, NC μSA
Las Vegas–Henderson, NV CSA	2,464,562	2,317,052	+6.37%	Las Vegas–Henderson–North Las Vegas, NV MSA; Pahrump, NV μSA
Nashville-Davidson–Murfreesboro, TN CSA	2,452,592	2,250,282	+8.99%	Nashville-Davidson–Murfreesboro–Franklin, TN MSA; Tullahoma–Manchester, TN μSA; Shelbyville, TN μSA; Lawrenceburg, TN μSA; Winchester, TN μSA; Lewisburg, TN μSA
Cincinnati–Wilmington, OH-KY-IN CSA	2,355,159	2,291,815	+2.76%	Cincinnati, OH-KY-IN MSA; Wilmington, OH μSA
Milwaukee–Racine–Waukesha, WI CSA	2,055,658	2,053,232	+0.12%	Milwaukee–Waukesha, WI MSA; Racine–Mount Pleasant, WI MSA; Whitewater–Elkhorn, WI μSA; Beaver Dam, WI μSA; Watertown–Fort Atkinson, WI μSA
Jacksonville–Kingsland–Palatka, FL-GA CSA	1,923,377	1,733,937	+10.93%	Jacksonville, FL MSA; Palatka, FL μSA; Kingsland, GA μSA
Virginia Beach–Chesapeake, VA-NC CSA	1,877,659	1,857,542	+1.08%	Virginia Beach–Chesapeake–Norfolk, VA-NC MSA; Elizabeth City, NC μSA; Kill Devil Hills, NC μSA
Greensboro–Winston-Salem–High Point, NC CSA	1,776,615	1,695,306	+4.80%	Greensboro–High Point, NC MSA; Winston-Salem, NC MSA; Burlington, NC MSA; Mount Airy, NC μSA
Greenville–Spartanburg–Anderson, SC CSA	1,659,022	1,511,905	+9.73%	Greenville–Anderson–Greer, SC MSA; Spartanburg, SC MSA; Greenwood, SC μSA; Seneca, SC μSA; Gaffney, SC μSA
Oklahoma City–Shawnee, OK CSA	1,587,915	1,498,149	+5.99%	Oklahoma City, OK MSA; Shawnee, OK μSA
Louisville/Jefferson County–Elizabethtown, KY-IN CSA	1,531,175	1,487,749	+2.92%	Louisville/Jefferson County, KY-IN MSA; Elizabethtown, KY MSA
Grand Rapids–Wyoming, MI CSA	1,527,054	1,486,055	+2.76%	Grand Rapids–Wyoming–Kentwood, MI MSA; Muskegon–Norton Shores, MI MSA; Holland, MI μSA; Big Rapids, MI μSA
Birmingham–Cullman–Talladega, AL CSA	1,383,539	1,361,033	+1.65%	Birmingham, AL MSA; Talladega–Sylacauga, AL μSA; Cullman, AL μSA
Memphis–Clarksdale–Forrest City, TN-MS-AR CSA	1,383,061	1,389,905	−0.49%	Memphis, TN-MS-AR MSA; Forrest City, AR μSA; Clarksdale, MS μSA
Fresno–Hanford–Corcoran, CA CSA	1,357,710	1,317,395	+3.06%	Fresno, CA MSA; Hanford–Corcoran, CA MSA
Cape Coral–Fort Myers–Naples, FL CSA	1,354,284	1,188,319	+13.97%	Cape Coral–Fort Myers, FL MSA; Naples–Marco Island, FL MSA; Clewiston, FL μSA
New Orleans–Metairie–Slidell, LA-MS CSA	1,354,257	1,373,453	−1.40%	New Orleans–Metairie, LA MSA; Slidell–Mandeville–Covington, LA MSA; Picayune, MS μSA; Bogalusa, LA μSA
Harrisburg–York–Lebanon, PA CSA	1,344,598	1,295,259	+3.81%	Harrisburg–Carlisle, PA MSA; York–Hanover, PA MSA; Lebanon, PA MSA; Gettysburg, PA MSA
Knoxville–Morristown–Sevierville, TN CSA	1,236,235	1,156,861	+6.86%	Knoxville, TN MSA; Morristown, TN MSA; Sevierville, TN μSA; Newport, TN μSA
Buffalo–Cheektowaga–Olean, NY CSA	1,231,043	1,243,944	−1.04%	Buffalo–Cheektowaga, NY MSA; Olean, NY μSA
Albany–Schenectady, NY CSA	1,202,638	1,190,727	+1.00%	Albany–Schenectady–Troy, NY MSA; Glens Falls, NY MSA; Hudson, NY μSA; Gloversville, NY μSA; Amsterdam, NY μSA
North Port–Bradenton, FL CSA	1,202,448	1,054,539	+14.03%	North Port–Bradenton–Sarasota, FL MSA; Punta Gorda, FL MSA; Arcadia, FL μSA
Tulsa–Bartlesville–Muskogee, OK CSA	1,190,018	1,134,125	+4.93%	Tulsa, OK MSA; Muskogee, OK μSA; Bartlesville, OK μSA
Albuquerque–Santa Fe–Los Alamos, NM CSA	1,171,736	1,162,523	+0.79%	Albuquerque, NM MSA; Santa Fe, NM MSA; Española, NM μSA; Las Vegas, NM μSA; Los Alamos, NM μSA
Rochester–Batavia–Seneca Falls, NY CSA	1,147,448	1,157,563	−0.87%	Rochester, NY MSA; Batavia, NY μSA; Seneca Falls, NY μSA
Tucson–Nogales, AZ CSA	1,124,705	1,091,102	+3.08%	Tucson, AZ MSA; Nogales, AZ μSA
El Paso–Las Cruces, TX-NM CSA	1,110,382	1,088,420	+2.02%	El Paso, TX MSA; Las Cruces, NM MSA
Columbia–Sumter–Orangeburg, SC CSA	1,107,723	1,056,968	+4.80%	Columbia, SC MSA; Sumter, SC MSA; Orangeburg, SC μSA; Newberry, SC μSA
Dayton–Springfield–Kettering, OH CSA	1,100,299	1,088,875	+1.05%	Dayton–Kettering–Beavercreek, OH MSA; Springfield, OH MSA; Greenville, OH μSA; Sidney, OH μSA; Urbana, OH μSA
Allentown–Bethlehem–East Stroudsburg, PA-NJ CSA	1,054,794	1,030,216	+2.39%	Allentown–Bethlehem–Easton, PA-NJ MSA; East Stroudsburg, PA μSA
Omaha–Fremont, NE-IA CSA	1,047,893	1,004,771	+4.29%	Omaha, NE MSA; Fremont, NE μSA
Baton Rouge–Hammond, LA CSA	1,030,045	1,003,726	+2.62%	Baton Rouge, LA MSA; Hammond, LA MSA
Chattanooga–Cleveland–Dalton, TN-GA-AL CSA	1,027,577	975,226	+5.37%	Chattanooga, TN-GA MSA; Dalton, GA MSA; Cleveland, TN MSA; Athens, TN μSA; Scottsboro, AL μSA; Summerville, GA μSA
McAllen–Edinburg, TX CSA	987,868	936,701	+5.46%	McAllen–Edinburg–Mission, TX MSA; Rio Grande City–Roma, TX μSA
Boise City–Mountain Home–Ontario, ID-OR CSA	953,793	850,341	+12.17%	Boise City, ID MSA; Ontario, OR-ID μSA; Mountain Home, ID μSA
Madison–Janesville–Beloit, WI CSA	942,809	910,246	+3.58%	Madison, WI MSA; Janesville–Beloit, WI MSA; Baraboo, WI μSA
Des Moines–West Des Moines–Ames, IA CSA	942,701	890,322	+5.88%	Des Moines–West Des Moines, IA MSA; Ames, IA MSA; Pella, IA μSA; Oskaloosa, IA μSA
Huntsville–Decatur–Albertville, AL-TN CSA	931,245	852,756	+9.20%	Huntsville, AL MSA; Decatur, AL MSA; Albertville, AL μSA; Fort Payne, AL μSA; Fayetteville, TN μSA
Little Rock–North Little Rock, AR CSA	927,903	899,663	+3.14%	Little Rock–North Little Rock–Conway, AR MSA; Searcy, AR μSA; Pine Bluff, AR μSA
South Bend–Elkhart–Mishawaka, IN-MI CSA	813,247	812,199	+0.13%	South Bend–Mishawaka, IN-MI MSA; Elkhart–Goshen, IN MSA; Niles, MI MSA; Warsaw, IN μSA; Plymouth, IN μSA
Spokane–Spokane Valley–Coeur d'Alene, WA-ID CSA	799,876	757,146	+5.64%	Spokane–Spokane Valley, WA MSA; Coeur d'Alene, ID MSA
Lexington-Fayette–Richmond–Frankfort, KY CSA	793,282	762,082	+4.09%	Lexington-Fayette, KY MSA; Richmond–Berea, KY μSA; Frankfort, KY μSA; Mount Sterling, KY μSA
Syracuse–Auburn, NY CSA	726,638	738,305	−1.58%	Syracuse, NY MSA; Auburn, NY μSA
Reno–Carson City–Gardnerville Ranchos, NV-CA CSA	714,310	684,678	+4.33%	Reno, NV MSA; Carson City, NV MSA; Gardnerville Ranchos, NV-CA μSA; Fallon, NV μSA
Fayetteville–Lumberton–Pinehurst, NC CSA	701,335	680,187	+3.11%	Fayetteville, NC MSA; Lumberton, NC μSA; Pinehurst–Southern Pines, NC MSA; Rockingham, NC μSA; Laurinburg, NC μSA
Springfield–Amherst Town–Northampton, MA CSA	699,101	699,162	−0.01%	Springfield, MA MSA; Amherst Town–Northampton, MA MSA; Greenfield, MA μSA
Wichita–Arkansas City–Winfield, KS CSA	698,191	682,159	+2.35%	Wichita, KS MSA; Arkansas City–Winfield, KS μSA
Portland–Lewiston–South Portland, ME CSA	694,122	662,879	+4.71%	Portland–South Portland, ME MSA; Lewiston–Auburn, ME MSA
Jackson–Vicksburg–Brookhaven, MS CSA	686,618	699,597	−1.86%	Jackson, MS MSA; Vicksburg, MS μSA; Brookhaven, MS μSA
Mobile–Daphne–Fairhope, AL CSA	679,419	646,576	+5.08%	Mobile, AL MSA; Daphne–Fairhope–Foley, AL MSA
Fort Wayne–Huntington–Auburn, IN CSA	667,403	645,409	+3.41%	Fort Wayne, IN MSA; Kendallville, IN μSA; Auburn, IN μSA; Huntington, IN μSA; Decatur, IN μSA; Angola, IN μSA
Savannah–Hinesville–Statesboro, GA CSA	660,642	608,239	+8.62%	Savannah, GA MSA; Statesboro, GA μSA; Hinesville, GA MSA; Jesup, GA μSA
Charleston–Huntington–Ashland, WV-OH-KY CSA	637,500	660,768	−3.52%	Huntington–Ashland, WV-KY-OH MSA; Charleston, WV MSA; Portsmouth, OH μSA
Johnson City–Kingsport–Bristol, TN-VA CSA	605,081	585,051	+3.42%	Kingsport–Bristol, TN-VA MSA; Johnson City, TN MSA; Greeneville, TN μSA
Columbus–Auburn–Opelika, GA-AL CSA	573,796	563,967	+1.74%	Columbus, GA-AL MSA; Auburn–Opelika, AL MSA; Alexander City, AL μSA
Lafayette–New Iberia–Opelousas, LA CSA	571,369	560,924	+1.86%	Lafayette, LA MSA; Opelousas, LA μSA; New Iberia, LA μSA
Lansing–East Lansing–Owosso, MI CSA	547,403	541,297	+1.13%	Lansing–East Lansing, MI MSA; Owosso, MI μSA
Corpus Christi–Kingsville–Alice, TX CSA	526,889	522,770	+0.79%	Corpus Christi, TX MSA; Alice, TX μSA; Kingsville, TX μSA
Youngstown–Warren–Salem, OH CSA	523,055	532,468	−1.77%	Youngstown–Warren, OH MSA; Salem, OH μSA
Asheville–Waynesville–Brevard, NC CSA	519,925	502,001	+3.57%	Asheville, NC MSA; Waynesville, NC μSA; Brevard, NC μSA
Myrtle Beach–Conway, SC CSA	493,463	414,433	+19.07%	Myrtle Beach–Conway–North Myrtle Beach, SC MSA; Murrells Inlet, SC μSA
Davenport–Moline, IA-IL CSA	468,307	474,019	−1.21%	Davenport–Moline–Rock Island, IA-IL MSA; Clinton, IA μSA; Muscatine, IA μSA
Cedar Rapids–Iowa City, IA CSA	461,996	451,939	+2.23%	Cedar Rapids, IA MSA; Iowa City, IA MSA
Kalamazoo–Battle Creek–Portage, MI CSA	458,171	456,919	+0.27%	Kalamazoo–Portage, MI MSA; Battle Creek, MI MSA; Sturgis, MI μSA
Brownsville–Harlingen–Raymondville, TX CSA	453,917	441,181	+2.89%	Brownsville–Harlingen, TX MSA; Raymondville, TX μSA
Macon-Bibb County–Warner Robins, GA CSA	446,644	425,416	+4.99%	Macon-Bibb County, GA MSA; Warner Robins, GA MSA
Gainesville–Lake City, FL CSA	433,130	408,945	+5.91%	Gainesville, FL MSA; Lake City, FL μSA
Rockford–Freeport–Rochelle, IL CSA	431,861	435,216	−0.77%	Rockford, IL MSA; Rochelle, IL μSA; Freeport, IL μSA
Tallahassee–Bainbridge, FL-GA CSA	426,874	413,665	+3.19%	Tallahassee, FL MSA; Bainbridge, GA μSA
Appleton–Oshkosh–Neenah, WI CSA	424,094	414,877	+2.22%	Appleton, WI MSA; Oshkosh–Neenah, WI MSA
Montgomery–Selma, AL CSA	423,887	424,509	−0.15%	Montgomery, AL MSA; Selma, AL μSA
Columbia–Jefferson City–Moberly, MO CSA	420,815	410,851	+2.43%	Columbia, MO MSA; Jefferson City, MO MSA; Moberly, MO μSA; Mexico, MO μSA
Shreveport–Bossier City–Minden, LA CSA	418,422	430,373	−2.78%	Shreveport–Bossier City, LA MSA; Minden, LA μSA
Lubbock–Plainview, TX CSA	405,131	389,192	+4.10%	Lubbock, TX MSA; Plainview, TX μSA
Peoria–Canton, IL CSA	396,406	402,391	−1.49%	Peoria, IL MSA; Canton, IL μSA
Kennewick–Richland–Walla Walla, WA CSA	386,695	366,206	+5.59%	Kennewick–Richland, WA MSA; Walla Walla, WA MSA
Midland–Odessa–Andrews, TX CSA	385,854	359,001	+7.48%	Midland, TX MSA; Odessa, TX MSA; Andrews, TX μSA
Green Bay–Shawano, WI CSA	382,515	373,404	+2.44%	Green Bay, WI MSA; Shawano, WI μSA
Lincoln–Beatrice, NE CSA	373,792	361,921	+3.28%	Lincoln, NE MSA; Beatrice, NE μSA
Saginaw–Midland–Bay City, MI CSA	373,565	377,474	−1.04%	Saginaw, MI MSA; Bay City, MI MSA; Midland, MI MSA
Erie–Meadville, PA CSA	347,624	354,814	−2.03%	Erie, PA MSA; Meadville, PA μSA
Evansville–Henderson, IN-KY CSA	330,970	327,066	+1.19%	Evansville, IN MSA; Henderson, KY μSA
Duluth–Grand Rapids, MN CSA	326,623	325,747	+0.27%	Duluth, MN-WI MSA; Grand Rapids, MN μSA
Rochester–Austin–Winona, MN CSA	322,678	316,029	+2.10%	Rochester, MN MSA; Winona, MN μSA; Austin, MN μSA
Champaign–Urbana–Danville, IL CSA	311,238	310,260	+0.32%	Champaign–Urbana, IL MSA; Danville, IL μSA
Medford–Grants Pass, OR CSA	309,662	311,349	−0.54%	Medford, OR MSA; Grants Pass, OR MSA
Tyler–Jacksonville, TX CSA	305,886	283,891	+7.75%	Tyler, TX MSA; Jacksonville, TX μSA
Springfield–Jacksonville–Lincoln, IL CSA	304,039	308,523	−1.45%	Springfield, IL MSA; Jacksonville, IL μSA; Taylorville, IL μSA; Lincoln, IL μSA
Amarillo–Borger, TX CSA	295,868	289,308	+2.27%	Amarillo, TX MSA; Borger, TX μSA
Idaho Falls–Rexburg–Blackfoot, ID CSA	294,384	271,722	+8.34%	Idaho Falls, ID MSA; Rexburg, ID μSA; Blackfoot, ID μSA
Rocky Mount–Wilson–Roanoke Rapids, NC CSA	292,661	288,747	+1.36%	Rocky Mount, NC MSA; Wilson, NC μSA; Roanoke Rapids, NC μSA
Fargo–Wahpeton, ND-MN CSA	292,547	272,878	+7.21%	Fargo, ND-MN MSA; Wahpeton, ND-MN μSA
Burlington–South Burlington–Barre, VT CSA	287,455	285,369	+0.73%	Burlington–South Burlington, VT MSA; Barre, VT μSA
Lafayette–West Lafayette–Frankfort, IN CSA	286,954	281,594	+1.90%	Lafayette–West Lafayette, IN MSA; Frankfort, IN μSA; Monticello, IN μSA
Wausau–Stevens Point–Wisconsin Rapids, WI CSA	285,435	282,597	+1.00%	Wausau, WI MSA; Wisconsin Rapids–Marshfield, WI μSA; Stevens Point, WI μSA
Lake Charles–DeRidder, LA CSA	281,328	291,201	−3.39%	Lake Charles, LA MSA; DeRidder, LA μSA
Bowling Green–Glasgow–Franklin, KY CSA	274,192	254,004	+7.95%	Bowling Green, KY MSA; Glasgow, KY μSA; Franklin, KY μSA
Monroe–Ruston, LA CSA	270,750	275,543	−1.74%	Monroe, LA MSA; Ruston, LA μSA
Harrisonburg–Staunton–Stuarts Draft, VA CSA	269,847	261,004	+3.39%	Harrisonburg, VA MSA; Staunton–Stuarts Draft, VA MSA
Dothan–Enterprise–Ozark, AL CSA	263,131	253,798	+3.68%	Dothan, AL MSA; Enterprise, AL μSA; Ozark, AL μSA
Bloomsburg–Berwick–Sunbury, PA CSA	255,949	256,927	−0.38%	Sunbury, PA μSA; Bloomsburg–Berwick, PA μSA; Lewisburg, PA μSA; Selinsgrove, PA μSA
Redding–Red Bluff, CA CSA	246,313	247,984	−0.67%	Redding, CA MSA; Red Bluff, CA μSA
Hattiesburg–Laurel, MS CSA	240,295	237,504	+1.18%	Hattiesburg, MS MSA; Laurel, MS μSA
Joplin–Miami, MO-OK-KS CSA	239,234	231,056	+3.54%	Joplin, MO-KS MSA; Miami, OK μSA
State College–DuBois, PA CSA	235,493	238,734	−1.36%	State College, PA MSA; DuBois, PA μSA
Greenville–Washington, NC CSA	227,606	214,895	+5.91%	Greenville, NC MSA; Washington, NC μSA
Eau Claire–Menomonie, WI CSA	222,870	217,447	+2.49%	Eau Claire, WI MSA; Menomonie, WI μSA
Pueblo–Cañon City, CO CSA	219,316	217,101	+1.02%	Pueblo, CO MSA; Cañon City, CO μSA
Mansfield–Ashland–Bucyrus, OH CSA	219,312	219,408	−0.04%	Mansfield, OH MSA; Ashland, OH μSA; Bucyrus, OH μSA
Lima–Van Wert–Celina, OH CSA	218,540	220,087	−0.70%	Lima, OH MSA; Wapakoneta, OH μSA; Celina, OH μSA; Van Wert, OH μSA
La Crosse–Onalaska–Sparta, WI CSA	217,754	216,615	+0.53%	La Crosse–Onalaska, WI-MN MSA; Sparta, WI μSA
Bloomington–Bedford, IN CSA	210,799	206,050	+2.30%	Bloomington, IN MSA; Bedford, IN μSA
Bloomington–Pontiac, IL CSA	206,476	206,769	−0.14%	Bloomington, IL MSA; Pontiac, IL μSA
Johnstown–Somerset, PA CSA	200,972	207,601	−3.19%	Johnstown, PA MSA; Somerset, PA μSA
Abilene–Sweetwater, TX CSA	199,546	191,317	+4.30%	Abilene, TX MSA; Sweetwater, TX μSA
New Bern–Morehead City, NC CSA	197,827	189,854	+4.20%	New Bern, NC μSA; Morehead City, NC μSA
Florence–Muscle Shoals–Russellville, AL CSA	189,058	182,904	+3.36%	Florence–Muscle Shoals, AL MSA; Russellville, AL μSA
Jonesboro–Paragould, AR CSA	186,851	179,932	+3.85%	Jonesboro, AR MSA; Paragould, AR μSA
Rapid City–Spearfish, SD CSA	186,393	173,160	+7.64%	Rapid City, SD MSA; Spearfish, SD μSA
Salisbury–Ocean Pines, MD CSA	186,331	180,668	+3.13%	Salisbury, MD MSA; Ocean Pines, MD μSA
Middlesborough–Corbin, KY CSA	172,869	173,960	−0.63%	Corbin, KY μSA; Middlesborough, KY μSA
Elmira–Corning, NY CSA	172,270	177,732	−3.07%	Corning, NY μSA; Elmira, NY MSA
Lawton–Duncan, OK CSA	171,900	169,500	+1.42%	Lawton, OK MSA; Duncan, OK μSA
Sioux City–Le Mars, IA-NE-SD CSA	171,435	170,032	+0.83%	Sioux City, IA-NE-SD MSA; Le Mars, IA μSA
Tupelo–Corinth, MS CSA	167,736	166,954	+0.47%	Tupelo, MS μSA; Corinth, MS μSA
Altoona–Huntingdon, PA CSA	162,542	166,914	−2.62%	Altoona, PA MSA; Huntingdon, PA μSA
Williamsport–Lock Haven, PA CSA	150,457	151,638	−0.78%	Williamsport, PA MSA; Lock Haven, PA μSA
Ithaca–Cortland, NY CSA	149,897	152,549	−1.74%	Ithaca, NY MSA; Cortland, NY μSA
Cape Girardeau–Sikeston, MO-IL CSA	149,193	148,153	+0.70%	Cape Girardeau, MO-IL MSA; Sikeston, MO μSA
Parkersburg–Marietta–Vienna, WV-OH CSA	145,653	149,261	−2.42%	Parkersburg–Vienna, WV MSA; Marietta, OH μSA
Fairmont–Clarksburg, WV CSA	143,726	146,639	−1.99%	Clarksburg, WV μSA; Fairmont, WV μSA
Paducah–Mayfield, KY-IL CSA	139,309	140,135	−0.59%	Paducah, KY-IL MSA; Mayfield, KY μSA
Edwards–Rifle, CO CSA	134,390	134,774	−0.28%	Rifle, CO μSA; Edwards, CO μSA
Hot Springs–Malvern, AR CSA	133,146	133,220	−0.06%	Hot Springs, AR MSA; Malvern, AR μSA
Mankato–New Ulm, MN CSA	130,424	129,478	+0.73%	Mankato, MN MSA; New Ulm, MN μSA
Findlay–Tiffin, OH CSA	129,556	129,989	−0.33%	Findlay, OH μSA; Tiffin, OH μSA
Starkville–Columbus, MS CSA	129,207	130,878	−1.28%	Columbus, MS μSA; Starkville, MS μSA
Moses Lake–Othello, WA CSA	127,215	119,736	+6.25%	Moses Lake, WA μSA; Othello, WA μSA
Keene–Brattleboro, NH-VT CSA	123,473	122,363	+0.91%	Keene, NH μSA; Brattleboro, VT μSA
Carbondale–Marion–Herrin, IL CSA	119,726	120,127	−0.33%	Carbondale, IL μSA; Marion–Herrin, IL μSA
Victoria–Port Lavaca, TX CSA	119,463	118,437	+0.87%	Victoria, TX MSA; Port Lavaca, TX μSA
Quincy–Hannibal, IL-MO CSA	113,115	114,649	−1.34%	Quincy, IL-MO μSA; Hannibal, MO μSA
Mount Pleasant–Alma, MI CSA	105,881	106,155	−0.26%	Mount Pleasant, MI μSA; Alma, MI μSA
Marinette–Iron Mountain, WI-MI CSA	96,090	95,879	+0.22%	Marinette, WI-MI μSA; Iron Mountain, MI-WI μSA
Pullman–Moscow, WA-ID CSA	90,354	87,490	+3.27%	Pullman, WA μSA; Moscow, ID μSA
Richmond–Connersville, IN CSA	89,702	89,951	−0.28%	Richmond, IN μSA; Connersville, IN μSA
Dixon–Sterling, IL CSA	87,035	89,836	−3.12%	Sterling, IL μSA; Dixon, IL μSA
Burlington–Fort Madison, IA-IL CSA	76,367	78,852	−3.15%	Burlington, IA-IL μSA; Fort Madison, IA μSA
Union City–Martin, TN CSA	63,328	63,689	−0.57%	Martin, TN μSA; Union City, TN μSA
Weatherford–Elk City, OK CSA	61,218	61,847	−1.02%	Weatherford, OK μSA; Elk City, OK μSA
Brookings–Crescent City, OR-CA CSA	49,031	51,189	−4.22%	Crescent City, CA μSA; Brookings, OR μSA
Spencer–Spirit Lake, IA CSA	34,279	34,087	+0.56%	Spirit Lake, IA μSA; Spencer, IA μSA

== Puerto Rico ==
This table lists the three combined statistical areas (CSAs) of Puerto Rico with the following information:

1. The CSA rank by population as of July 1, 2025, as estimated by the United States Census Bureau
2. The CSA name as designated by the United States Office of Management and Budget
3. The CSA population as of July 1, 2025, as estimated by the United States Census Bureau
4. The CSA population as of April 1, 2020, as enumerated by the 2020 United States census
5. The percent CSA population change from April 1, 2020, to July 1, 2025
6. The core-based statistical areas (CBSAs) that constitute the CSA

The three combined statistical areas of the Commonwealth of Puerto Rico
Rank	Combined statistical area	2025 estimate	2020 census	Change	Constituent core-based statistical areas
1	San Juan–Bayamón, PR CSA	2,346,144	2,414,593	−2.83%	San Juan–Bayamón–Caguas, PR MSA; Arecibo, PR MSA; Guayama, PR MSA; Lares, PR μSA; Utuado, PR μSA; Coco, PR μSA
2	Mayagüez–Aguadilla, PR CSA	456,443	467,599	−2.39%	Aguadilla, PR MSA; Mayagüez, PR MSA
3	Ponce–Coamo, PR CSA	315,415	333,426	−5.40%	Ponce, PR MSA; Coamo, PR μSA

== See also ==
- United States of America
  - Outline of the United States
- Demographics of the United States
  - United States Census Bureau
    - List of U.S. states and territories by population
    - List of United States cities by population
    - List of United States counties and county equivalents
  - United States Office of Management and Budget
    - Statistical area (United States)
      - Core-based statistical area (list)
        - Metropolitan statistical area
        - Micropolitan statistical area
- Megaregions of the United States
