= Metropolitan statistical area =

Type of geographical region in the United States

In the United States, a metropolitan statistical area (MSA) is a geographical region based on a county or a group of counties with at least one urbanized area with a population of at least 50,000 and adjacent counties with economic ties to the central area. Such regions are not legally incorporated as a city or town would be and are not legal administrative divisions like counties or separate entities such as states. As a result, sometimes the precise definition of a given metropolitan area will vary between sources. The statistical criteria for a standard metropolitan area were defined in 1949 and later redefined as those for a metropolitan statistical area in 1983.

Due to suburbanization, the typical metropolitan area is polycentric rather than being centered around a large historic core city such as New York City or Chicago. Some metropolitan areas include more than one large historic core city; examples include the Dallas–Fort Worth metroplex, Virginia Beach–Norfolk–Newport News (Hampton Roads), Riverside–San Bernardino (Inland Empire), and Minneapolis–St. Paul (Twin Cities).

MSAs are defined by the Office of Management and Budget (OMB), which is part of the Executive Office of the President, and are used by the U.S. Census Bureau and other U.S. federal government agencies for statistical purposes.

== Definitions ==
An enlargeable map of the 935 core-based statistical areas (CBSAs) of the United States and Puerto Rico as of 2023; the 393 MSAs are shown in green.

Metro area populations

The U.S. Office of Management and Budget defines a set of core-based statistical areas (CBSAs) throughout the country, which are composed of counties and county equivalents.

CBSAs are delineated on the basis of a central contiguous area of relatively high population density, known as an urban area. The counties containing the core urban area are known as the "central counties" of the CBSA; these are defined as having at least 50% of their population living in urban areas with at least 10,000 residents. Additional surrounding counties, known as "outlying counties", can be included in the CBSA if these counties have strong social and economic ties to the central county or counties as measured by commuting and employment. Outlying counties are included in the CBSA if 25% of the workers living in the county work in the central county or counties, or if 25% of the employment in the county is held by workers who live in the central county or counties.

Adjacent CBSAs are merged into a single CBSA when the central county or counties of one CBSA qualify as an outlying county or counties to the other CBSAs. One or more CBSAs may be grouped together or combined to form a larger statistical entity known as a combined statistical area (CSA) when the employment interchange measure (EIM) reaches 15% or more.

CBSAs are subdivided into MSAs (formed around urban areas with at least 50,000 in population) and micropolitan statistical areas (μSAs), which are CBSAs built around urban areas with at least 10,000 but fewer than 50,000 in population. Some metropolitan areas may include multiple cities with populations below 50,000, but combined have over 50,000 people. Previous terms that were used to describe these regions include "standard metropolitan statistical area" (SMSA) and "primary metropolitan statistical area" (PMSA). Metropolitan statistical areas containing over 2.5 million people can also be further divided into metropolitan divisions.

On January 19, 2021, OMB submitted a proposed regulation for public comment to increase the minimum population required for an urban area to be designated as a metropolitan statistical area from 50,000 to 100,000. It ultimately decided to keep the minimum at 50,000 for the 2020 cycle.

On July 21, 2023, the Office of Management and Budget released revised delineations of the various CBSAs in the United States.

== History ==
The Census Bureau created the metropolitan district for the 1910 census as a standardized classification for large urban centers and their surrounding areas. The original threshold for a metropolitan district was 200,000, but was lowered to 100,000 in 1930, and lowered again to 50,000 in 1940. The metropolitan districts were replaced by standard metropolitan areas (SMAs) in the 1950 census, which were defined by the Bureau of the Budget (now the Office of Management and Budget) and later renamed to standard metropolitan statistical areas (SMAs) in 1959. The modern metropolitan statistical area was created in 1983 amid a large increase in the number of eligible markets, which grew from 172 in 1950 to 288 in 1980; the core based statistical area (CBSA) was introduced in 2000 and defined in 2003 with a minimum population of 10,000 required for micropolitan areas and 50,000 for urban areas.

== United States ==
Location of the 20 largest MSAs in the United States, based on U.S. Census Bureau estimates for July 1, 2025

The 387 MSAs in the United States, including those in all 50 states and the national capital of Washington, D.C. are ranked, including:

1. The MSA rank by population as of July 1, 2025, as estimated by the United States Census Bureau
2. The MSA name as designated by the United States Office of Management and Budget
3. The MSA population as of July 1, 2025, as estimated by the United States Census Bureau
4. The MSA population as of April 1, 2020, as enumerated by the 2020 United States census (Note: Populations retroactively adjusted to account for new MSA delineations as redefined in 2023. This number reflects what the 2020 Census would have shown the population to be had the current delineated boundaries been in effect at the time of the 2020 Census.)
5. The percent MSA population change from April 1, 2020, to July 1, 2025
6. The combined statistical area (CSA) (Note: The U.S.Office of Management and Budget (OMB) defines a CSA (CSA) as an aggregate of adjacent core-based statistical areas that are linked by commuting ties.) if it is designated and the MSA is a component

The 387 metropolitan statistical areas of the United States
Metropolitan statistical area	2025 estimate	2020 census	% change	Pop. change	Encompassing combined statistical area
New York–Newark–Jersey City, NY-NJ MSA	20,112,448	20,081,935	+0.15%	+30,513	New York–Newark, NY-NJ-CT-PA CSA
Los Angeles–Long Beach–Anaheim, CA MSA	12,844,441	13,200,998	−2.70%	-356,557	Los Angeles–Long Beach, CA CSA
Chicago–Naperville–Elgin, IL-IN MSA	9,434,123	9,449,351	−0.16%	-15,228	Chicago–Naperville, IL-IN-WI CSA
Dallas–Fort Worth–Arlington, TX MSA	8,477,157	7,637,387	+11.00%	+839,770	Dallas–Fort Worth, TX-OK CSA
Houston–Pasadena–The Woodlands, TX MSA	7,904,627	7,149,642	+10.56%	+754,985	Houston–Pasadena, TX CSA
Atlanta–Sandy Springs–Roswell, GA MSA	6,482,182	6,104,803	+6.18%	+377,379	Atlanta–Athens-Clarke County–Sandy Springs, GA-AL CSA
Washington–Arlington–Alexandria, DC-VA-MD-WV MSA	6,465,724	6,278,542	+2.98%	+187,182	Washington–Baltimore–Arlington, DC-MD-VA-WV-PA CSA
Miami–Fort Lauderdale–West Palm Beach, FL MSA	6,391,072	6,138,333	+4.12%	+252,739	Miami–Port St. Lucie–Fort Lauderdale, FL CSA
Philadelphia–Camden–Wilmington, PA-NJ-DE-MD MSA	6,329,118	6,245,051	+1.35%	+84,067	Philadelphia–Reading–Camden, PA-NJ-DE-MD CSA
Phoenix–Mesa–Chandler, AZ MSA	5,228,938	4,845,832	+7.91%	+383,106	Phoenix–Mesa, AZ CSA
Boston–Cambridge–Newton, MA-NH MSA	5,034,221	4,941,632	+1.87%	+92,589	Boston–Worcester–Providence, MA-RI-NH CSA
Riverside–San Bernardino–Ontario, CA MSA	4,769,007	4,599,839	+3.68%	+169,168	Los Angeles–Long Beach, CA CSA
San Francisco–Oakland–Fremont, CA MSA	4,630,041	4,749,008	−2.51%	-118,967	San Jose–San Francisco–Oakland, CA CSA
Detroit–Warren–Dearborn, MI MSA	4,390,913	4,392,041	−0.03%	-1,128	Detroit–Warren–Ann Arbor, MI CSA
Seattle–Tacoma–Bellevue, WA MSA	4,161,883	4,018,762	+3.56%	+143,121	Seattle–Tacoma, WA CSA
Minneapolis–St. Paul–Bloomington, MN-WI MSA	3,790,295	3,690,261	+2.71%	+100,034	Minneapolis–St. Paul, MN-WI CSA
Tampa–St. Petersburg–Clearwater, FL MSA	3,418,895	3,175,275	+7.67%	+243,620	
San Diego–Chula Vista–Carlsbad, CA MSA	3,282,248	3,298,634	−0.50%	-16,386	
Denver–Aurora–Centennial, CO MSA	3,092,037	2,963,821	+4.33%	+128,216	Denver–Aurora–Greeley, CO CSA
Orlando–Kissimmee–Sanford, FL MSA	2,957,672	2,673,376	+10.63%	+284,296	Orlando–Lakeland–Deltona, FL CSA
Charlotte–Concord–Gastonia, NC-SC MSA	2,938,830	2,660,329	+10.47%	+278,501	Charlotte–Concord, NC-SC CSA
Baltimore–Columbia–Towson, MD MSA	2,857,781	2,844,510	+0.47%	+13,271	Washington–Baltimore–Arlington, DC-MD-VA-WV-PA CSA
St. Louis, MO-IL MSA	2,814,421	2,820,253	−0.21%	-5,832	St. Louis–St. Charles–Farmington, MO-IL CSA
San Antonio–New Braunfels, TX MSA	2,813,140	2,558,143	+9.97%	+254,997	San Antonio–New Braunfels–Kerrville, TX CSA
Austin–Round Rock–San Marcos, TX MSA	2,620,945	2,283,371	+14.78%	+337,574	
Portland–Vancouver–Hillsboro, OR-WA MSA	2,542,282	2,512,859	+1.17%	+29,423	Portland–Vancouver–Salem, OR-WA CSA
Sacramento–Roseville–Folsom, CA MSA	2,477,274	2,397,382	+3.33%	+79,892	Sacramento–Roseville, CA CSA
Pittsburgh, PA MSA	2,421,992	2,457,000	−1.42%	-35,008	Pittsburgh–Weirton–Steubenville, PA-OH-WV CSA
Las Vegas–Henderson–North Las Vegas, NV MSA	2,407,226	2,265,461	+6.26%	+141,765	Las Vegas–Henderson, NV CSA
Cincinnati, OH-KY-IN MSA	2,312,858	2,249,797	+2.80%	+63,061	Cincinnati–Wilmington, OH-KY-IN CSA
Kansas City, MO-KS MSA	2,270,682	2,192,035	+3.59%	+78,647	Kansas City–Overland Park–Kansas City, MO-KS CSA
Columbus, OH MSA	2,242,028	2,138,926	+4.82%	+103,102	Columbus–Marion–Zanesville, OH CSA
Indianapolis–Carmel–Greenwood, IN MSA	2,205,695	2,089,653	+5.55%	+116,042	Indianapolis–Carmel–Muncie, IN CSA
Nashville-Davidson–Murfreesboro–Franklin, TN MSA	2,197,416	2,014,444	+9.08%	+182,972	Nashville-Davidson–Murfreesboro, TN CSA
Cleveland, OH MSA	2,165,775	2,185,825	−0.92%	-20,050	Cleveland–Akron–Canton, OH CSA
San Jose–Sunnyvale–Santa Clara, CA MSA	1,984,473	2,000,468	−0.80%	-15,995	San Jose–San Francisco–Oakland, CA CSA
Virginia Beach–Norfolk–Newport News, VA-NC, MSA	1,797,213	1,780,059	+0.96%	+17,154	Virginia Beach–Norfolk, VA-NC CSA
Jacksonville, FL MSA	1,785,500	1,605,848	+11.19%	+179,652	Jacksonville–Kingsland–Palatka, FL-GA CSA
Providence–Warwick, RI-MA MSA	1,708,161	1,676,579	+1.88%	+31,582	Boston–Worcester–Providence, MA-RI-NH CSA
Raleigh–Cary, NC MSA	1,595,720	1,413,982	+12.85%	+181,738	Raleigh–Durham–Cary, NC CSA
Milwaukee–Waukesha, WI MSA	1,575,010	1,574,731	+0.02%	+279	Milwaukee–Racine–Waukesha, WI CSA
Oklahoma City, OK MSA	1,512,813	1,425,695	+6.11%	+87,118	Oklahoma City–Shawnee, OK CSA
Louisville/Jefferson County, KY-IN MSA	1,402,509	1,362,180	+2.96%	+40,329	Louisville/Jefferson County–Elizabethtown, KY-IN CSA
Richmond, VA MSA	1,389,338	1,314,434	+5.70%	+74,904	
Memphis, TN-MS-AR MSA	1,341,412	1,345,425	−0.30%	-4,013	Memphis–Clarksdale–Forrest City, TN-MS-AR CSA
Salt Lake City–Murray, UT MSA	1,308,377	1,257,936	+4.01%	+50,441	Salt Lake City–Provo–Orem, UT CSA
Fresno, CA MSA	1,203,383	1,164,909	+3.30%	+38,474	Fresno–Hanford–Corcoran, CA CSA
Birmingham, AL MSA	1,197,766	1,180,631	+1.45%	+17,135	Birmingham–Cullman–Talladega, AL CSA
Grand Rapids–Wyoming–Kentwood, MI MSA	1,183,645	1,150,015	+2.92%	+33,630	Grand Rapids–Wyoming, MI CSA
Hartford–West Hartford–East Hartford, CT MSA	1,171,426	1,150,473	+1.82%	+20,953	New Haven–Hartford–Waterbury, CT CSA
Buffalo–Cheektowaga, NY MSA	1,155,653	1,166,902	−0.96%	-11,249	Buffalo–Cheektowaga–Olean, NY CSA
Tucson, AZ MSA	1,074,685	1,043,433	+3.00%	+31,252	Tucson–Nogales, AZ CSA
Tulsa, OK MSA	1,069,273	1,015,331	+5.31%	+53,942	Tulsa–Bartlesville–Muskogee, OK CSA
Rochester, NY MSA	1,056,149	1,065,361	−0.86%	-9,212	Rochester–Batavia–Seneca Falls, NY CSA
Greenville–Anderson–Greer, SC MSA	1,014,101	928,195	+9.26%	+85,906	Greenville–Spartanburg–Anderson, SC CSA
Omaha, NE-IA MSA	1,009,836	967,604	+4.36%	+42,232	Omaha–Fremont, NE-IA CSA
Urban Honolulu, HI MSA	988,703	1,016,508	−2.74%	-27,805	
Bridgeport–Stamford–Danbury, CT MSA	978,179	946,327	+3.37%	+31,852	New York–Newark, NY-NJ-CT-PA CSA
New Orleans–Metairie, LA MSA	970,849	1,007,275	−3.62%	-36,426	New Orleans–Metairie–Slidell, LA-MS CSA
Knoxville, TN MSA	968,137	903,300	+7.18%	+64,837	Knoxville–Morristown–Sevierville, TN CSA
North Port–Bradenton–Sarasota, FL MSA	948,158	833,716	+13.73%	+114,442	North Port–Bradenton, FL CSA
Bakersfield–Delano, CA MSA	927,068	909,235	+1.96%	+17,833	
Albuquerque, NM MSA	925,279	916,528	+0.95%	+8,751	Albuquerque–Santa Fe–Los Alamos, NM CSA
McAllen–Edinburg–Mission, TX MSA	921,549	870,781	+5.83%	+50,768	McAllen–Edinburg, TX CSA
Albany–Schenectady–Troy, NY MSA	915,835	899,262	+1.84%	+16,573	Albany–Schenectady, NY CSA
Charleston–North Charleston, SC MSA	889,263	799,636	+11.21%	+89,627	
Baton Rouge, LA MSA	888,699	870,569	+2.08%	+18,130	Baton Rouge–Hammond, LA CSA
Worcester, MA MSA	888,502	862,111	+3.06%	+26,391	Boston–Worcester–Providence, MA-RI-NH CSA
Allentown–Bethlehem–Easton, PA-NJ MSA	887,615	861,889	+2.98%	+25,726	Allentown–Bethlehem–East Stroudsburg, PA-NJ CSA
El Paso, TX MSA	881,291	868,859	+1.43%	+12,432	El Paso–Las Cruces, TX-NM CSA
Columbia, SC MSA	879,918	829,470	+6.08%	+50,448	Columbia–Sumter–Orangeburg, SC CSA
Cape Coral–Fort Myers, FL MSA	875,607	760,822	+15.09%	+114,785	Cape Coral–Fort Myers–Naples, FL CSA
Lakeland–Winter Haven, FL MSA	874,790	725,046	+20.65%	+149,744	Orlando–Lakeland–Deltona, FL CSA
Boise City, ID MSA	864,243	764,718	+13.01%	+99,525	Boise City–Mountain Home–Ontario, ID-OR CSA
Oxnard–Thousand Oaks–Ventura, CA MSA	830,851	843,843	−1.54%	-12,992	Los Angeles–Long Beach, CA CSA
Dayton–Kettering–Beavercreek, OH MSA	826,554	814,049	+1.54%	+12,505	Dayton–Springfield–Kettering, OH CSA
Stockton–Lodi, CA MSA	823,815	779,233	+5.72%	+44,582	San Jose–San Francisco–Oakland, CA CSA
Greensboro–High Point, NC MSA	805,945	776,566	+3.78%	+29,379	Greensboro–Winston-Salem–High Point, NC CSA
Colorado Springs, CO MSA	781,796	755,105	+3.53%	+26,691	
Little Rock–North Little Rock–Conway, AR MSA	777,607	748,031	+3.95%	+29,576	Little Rock–North Little Rock, AR CSA
Provo–Orem–Lehi, UT MSA	773,426	671,185	+15.23%	+102,241	Salt Lake City–Provo–Orem, UT CSA
Des Moines–West Des Moines, IA MSA	758,539	709,466	+6.92%	+49,073	Des Moines–West Des Moines–Ames, IA CSA
Deltona–Daytona Beach–Ormond Beach, FL MSA	746,933	668,921	+11.66%	+78,012	Orlando–Lakeland–Deltona, FL CSA
Kiryas Joel–Poughkeepsie–Newburgh, NY MSA	718,377	697,221	+3.03%	+21,156	New York–Newark, NY-NJ-CT-PA CSA
Winston-Salem, NC MSA	712,206	675,966	+5.36%	+36,240	Greensboro–Winston-Salem–High Point, NC CSA
Madison, WI MSA	709,685	680,796	+4.24%	+28,889	Madison–Janesville–Beloit, WI CSA
Akron, OH MSA	701,780	702,219	−0.06%	-439	Cleveland–Akron–Canton, OH CSA
Ogden, UT MSA	672,784	637,197	+5.58%	+35,587	Salt Lake City–Provo–Orem, UT CSA
Palm Bay–Melbourne–Titusville, FL MSA	663,982	606,612	+9.46%	+57,370	
Wichita, KS MSA	663,809	647,610	+2.50%	+16,199	Wichita–Arkansas City–Winfield, KS CSA
Syracuse, NY MSA	652,273	662,057	−1.48%	-9,784	Syracuse–Auburn, NY CSA
Augusta-Richmond County, GA-SC MSA	641,231	611,000	+4.95%	+30,231	
Durham–Chapel Hill, NC MSA	625,485	588,911	+6.21%	+36,574	Raleigh–Durham–Cary, NC CSA
Fayetteville–Springdale–Rogers, AR MSA	622,177	546,725	+13.80%	+75,452	
Harrisburg–Carlisle, PA MSA	617,427	591,712	+4.35%	+25,715	Harrisburg–York–Lebanon, PA CSA
Jackson, MS MSA	609,847	619,968	−1.63%	-10,121	Jackson–Vicksburg–Brookhaven, MS CSA
Spokane–Spokane Valley, WA MSA	608,012	585,784	+3.79%	+22,228	Spokane–Spokane Valley–Coeur d'Alene, WA-ID CSA
Toledo, OH MSA	599,376	606,240	−1.13%	-6,864	
Chattanooga, TN-GA MSA	594,530	562,647	+5.67%	+31,883	Chattanooga–Cleveland–Dalton, TN-GA-AL CSA
New Haven, CT MSA	578,741	570,487	+1.45%	+8,254	New Haven–Hartford–Waterbury, CT CSA
Reno, NV MSA	578,734	549,831	+5.26%	+28,903	Reno–Carson City–Gardnerville Ranchos, NV-CA CSA
Portland–South Portland, ME MSA	577,635	551,740	+4.69%	+25,895	Portland–Lewiston–South Portland, ME CSA
Scranton–Wilkes-Barre, PA MSA	574,418	567,559	+1.21%	+6,859	
Port St. Lucie, FL MSA	568,721	487,657	+16.62%	+81,064	Miami–Port St. Lucie–Fort Lauderdale, FL CSA
Lancaster, PA MSA	563,159	552,984	+1.84%	+10,175	
Modesto, CA MSA	557,719	552,878	+0.88%	+4,841	San Jose–San Francisco–Oakland, CA CSA
Huntsville, AL MSA	556,444	491,723	+13.16%	+64,721	Huntsville–Decatur–Albertville, AL-TN CSA
Pensacola–Ferry Pass–Brent, FL MSA	544,949	509,905	+6.87%	+35,044	
Lexington-Fayette, KY MSA	535,174	516,811	+3.55%	+18,363	Lexington-Fayette–Richmond–Frankfort, KY CSA
Killeen–Temple, TX MSA	511,497	475,367	+7.60%	+36,130	
Springfield, MO MSA	500,694	475,432	+5.31%	+25,262	
Wilmington, NC MSA	492,772	422,598	+16.61%	+70,174	
Santa Rosa–Petaluma, CA MSA	486,444	488,863	−0.49%	-2,419	
Visalia, CA MSA	485,146	473,117	+2.54%	+12,029	
Lansing–East Lansing, MI MSA	479,722	473,203	+1.38%	+6,519	Lansing–East Lansing–Owosso, MI CSA
York–Hanover, PA MSA	473,197	456,438	+3.67%	+16,759	Harrisburg–York–Lebanon, PA CSA
Fort Wayne, IN MSA	466,258	447,781	+4.13%	+18,477	Fort Wayne–Huntington–Auburn, IN CSA
Springfield, MA MSA	464,338	465,825	−0.32%	-1,487	Springfield–Amherst Town–Northampton, MA CSA
Waterbury–Shelton, CT MSA	463,349	450,376	+2.88%	+12,973	New Haven–Hartford–Waterbury, CT CSA
Vallejo, CA MSA	455,376	453,491	+0.42%	+1,885	San Jose–San Francisco–Oakland, CA CSA
Corpus Christi, TX MSA	451,191	445,763	+1.22%	+5,428	Corpus Christi–Kingsville–Alice, TX CSA
Salem, OR MSA	445,814	433,353	+2.88%	+12,461	Portland–Vancouver–Salem, OR-WA CSA
Ocala, FL MSA	442,660	375,908	+17.76%	+66,752	
Santa Maria–Santa Barbara, CA MSA	442,065	448,229	−1.38%	-6,164	
Reading, PA MSA	440,072	428,849	+2.62%	+11,223	Philadelphia–Reading–Camden, PA-NJ-DE-MD CSA
Savannah, GA MSA	438,314	404,798	+8.28%	+33,516	Savannah–Hinesville–Statesboro, GA CSA
Brownsville–Harlingen, TX MSA	433,946	421,017	+3.07%	+12,929	Brownsville–Harlingen–Raymondville, TX CSA
Salinas, CA MSA	433,729	439,035	−1.21%	-5,306	
Manchester–Nashua, NH MSA	433,415	422,937	+2.48%	+10,478	Boston–Worcester–Providence, MA-RI-NH CSA
Gulfport–Biloxi, MS MSA	431,329	416,259	+3.62%	+15,070	
Myrtle Beach–Conway–North Myrtle Beach, SC MSA	427,551	351,029	+21.80%	+76,522	Myrtle Beach–Conway, SC CSA
Lafayette, LA MSA	423,758	408,455	+3.75%	+15,303	Lafayette–New Iberia–Opelousas, LA CSA
Youngstown–Warren, OH MSA	423,678	430,591	−1.61%	-6,913	Youngstown–Warren–Salem, OH CSA
Asheville, NC MSA	422,345	406,926	+3.79%	+15,419	Asheville–Waynesville–Brevard, NC CSA
Naples–Marco Island, FL MSA	417,131	375,752	+11.01%	+41,379	Cape Coral–Fort Myers–Naples, FL CSA
Mobile, AL MSA	411,658	414,809	−0.76%	-3,151	Mobile–Daphne–Fairhope, AL CSA
Spartanburg, SC MSA	407,656	355,241	+14.75%	+52,415	Greenville–Spartanburg–Anderson, SC CSA
Anchorage, AK MSA	405,821	398,328	+1.88%	+7,493	
Flint, MI MSA	401,093	406,211	−1.26%	-5,118	Detroit–Warren–Ann Arbor, MI CSA
Canton–Massillon, OH MSA	400,246	401,574	−0.33%	-1,328	Cleveland–Akron–Canton, OH CSA
Beaumont–Port Arthur, TX MSA	399,310	397,565	+0.44%	+1,745	
Trenton–Princeton, NJ MSA	399,289	387,340	+3.08%	+11,949	New York–Newark, NY-NJ-CT-PA CSA
Tallahassee, FL MSA	397,442	384,298	+3.42%	+13,144	Tallahassee–Bainbridge, FL-GA CSA
Fayetteville, NC MSA	395,412	386,810	+2.22%	+8,602	Fayetteville–Lumberton–Pinehurst, NC CSA
Montgomery, AL MSA	388,747	386,047	+0.70%	+2,700	Montgomery–Selma, AL CSA
Shreveport–Bossier City, LA MSA	383,474	393,406	−2.52%	-9,932	Shreveport–Bossier City–Minden, LA CSA
Eugene–Springfield, OR MSA	381,584	382,971	−0.36%	-1,387	
Davenport–Moline–Rock Island, IA-IL MSA	380,452	384,324	−1.01%	-3,872	Davenport–Moline, IA-IL CSA
Greeley, CO MSA	378,426	328,981	+15.03%	+49,445	Denver–Aurora–Greeley, CO CSA
Fort Collins–Loveland, CO MSA	377,292	359,066	+5.08%	+18,226	
Hickory–Lenoir–Morganton, NC MSA	376,890	365,276	+3.18%	+11,614	Charlotte–Concord, NC-SC CSA
Atlantic City–Hammonton, NJ MSA	372,047	369,797	+0.61%	+2,250	Philadelphia–Reading–Camden, PA-NJ-DE-MD CSA
Ann Arbor, MI MSA	370,214	372,258	−0.55%	-2,044	Detroit–Warren–Ann Arbor, MI CSA
Lubbock, TX MSA	368,431	351,268	+4.89%	+17,163	Lubbock–Plainview, TX CSA
Huntington–Ashland, WV-KY-OH MSA	365,965	376,155	−2.71%	-10,190	Charleston–Huntington–Ashland, WV-OH-KY CSA
Peoria, IL MSA	363,505	368,782	−1.43%	-5,277	Peoria–Canton, IL CSA
Gainesville, FL MSA	359,036	339,247	+5.83%	+19,789	Gainesville–Lake City, FL CSA
Lincoln, NE MSA	352,081	340,217	+3.49%	+11,864	Lincoln–Beatrice, NE CSA
Clarksville, TN-KY MSA	349,001	320,535	+8.88%	+28,466	
Rockford, IL MSA	337,242	338,798	−0.46%	-1,556	Rockford–Freeport–Rochelle, IL CSA
Green Bay, WI MSA	336,756	328,268	+2.59%	+8,488	Green Bay–Shawano, WI CSA
Boulder, CO MSA	328,560	330,758	−0.66%	-2,198	Denver–Aurora–Greeley, CO CSA
Columbus, GA-AL MSA	324,830	328,883	−1.23%	-4,053	Columbus–Auburn–Opelika, GA-AL CSA
South Bend–Mishawaka, IN-MI MSA	324,538	324,501	+0.01%	+37	South Bend–Elkhart–Mishawaka, IN-MI CSA
Kennewick–Richland, WA MSA	324,334	303,622	+6.82%	+20,712	Kennewick–Richland–Walla Walla, WA CSA
Roanoke, VA MSA	316,547	315,251	+0.41%	+1,296	
Hagerstown–Martinsburg, MD-WV MSA	315,280	293,844	+7.30%	+21,436	Washington–Baltimore–Arlington, DC-MD-VA-WV-PA CSA
Crestview–Fort Walton Beach–Destin, FL MSA	315,098	286,973	+9.80%	+28,125	
Kingsport–Bristol, TN-VA MSA	314,834	307,614	+2.35%	+7,220	Johnson City–Kingsport–Bristol, TN-VA CSA
Sioux Falls, SD-MN MSA	314,638	286,434	+9.85%	+28,204	
Waco, TX MSA	308,807	295,782	+4.40%	+13,025	
Olympia–Lacey–Tumwater, WA MSA	304,261	294,793	+3.21%	+9,468	Seattle–Tacoma, WA CSA
Longview, TX MSA	297,315	286,184	+3.89%	+11,131	
Merced, CA MSA	297,260	281,202	+5.71%	+16,058	San Jose–San Francisco–Oakland, CA CSA
College Station–Bryan, TX MSA	287,476	268,248	+7.17%	+19,228	
Utica–Rome, NY MSA	285,611	292,264	−2.28%	-6,653	
Norwich–New London–Willimantic, CT MSA	284,015	280,430	+1.28%	+3,585	New Haven–Hartford–Waterbury, CT CSA
Bremerton–Silverdale–Port Orchard, WA MSA	283,374	275,611	+2.82%	+7,763	Seattle–Tacoma, WA CSA
San Luis Obispo–Paso Robles, CA MSA	282,367	282,424	−0.02%	-57	
Tuscaloosa, AL MSA	281,850	268,674	+4.90%	+13,176	
Laredo, TX MSA	281,224	267,114	+5.28%	+14,110	
Duluth, MN-WI MSA	281,219	280,733	+0.17%	+486	Duluth–Grand Rapids, MN-WI CSA
Cedar Rapids, IA MSA	279,285	276,520	+1.00%	+2,765	Cedar Rapids–Iowa City, IA CSA
Slidell–Mandeville–Covington, LA MSA	279,108	264,570	+5.49%	+14,538	New Orleans–Metairie–Slidell, LA-MS CSA
Amarillo, TX MSA	276,235	268,691	+2.81%	+7,544	Amarillo–Borger, TX CSA
Evansville, IN MSA	273,786	269,256	+1.68%	+4,530	Evansville–Henderson, IN-KY CSA
Fargo, ND-MN MSA	269,528	249,843	+7.88%	+19,685	Fargo–Wahpeton, ND-MN CSA
Lynchburg, VA MSA	269,169	261,593	+2.90%	+7,576	
Daphne–Fairhope–Foley, AL MSA	267,761	231,767	+15.53%	+35,994	Mobile–Daphne–Fairhope, AL CSA
Bend, OR MSA	266,376	247,493	+7.63%	+18,883	
Erie, PA MSA	265,832	270,876	−1.86%	-5,044	Erie–Meadville, PA CSA
Kalamazoo–Portage, MI MSA	263,795	261,670	+0.81%	+2,125	Kalamazoo–Battle Creek–Portage, MI CSA
Yakima, WA MSA	259,185	256,728	+0.96%	+2,457	
Santa Cruz–Watsonville, CA MSA	258,852	270,861	−4.43%	-12,009	San Jose–San Francisco–Oakland, CA CSA
Prescott Valley–Prescott, AZ MSA	252,552	236,209	+6.92%	+16,343	
Tyler, TX MSA	252,549	233,479	+8.17%	+19,070	Tyler–Jacksonville, TX CSA
Appleton, WI MSA	249,876	243,147	+2.77%	+6,729	Appleton–Oshkosh–Neenah, WI CSA
Lake Charles, LA MSA	244,655	254,652	−3.93%	-9,997	Lake Charles–DeRidder, LA CSA
Binghamton, NY MSA	243,189	247,138	−1.60%	-3,949	
Hilton Head Island–Bluffton–Port Royal, SC MSA	242,966	215,908	+12.53%	+27,058	
Champaign–Urbana, IL MSA	239,979	236,072	+1.66%	+3,907	Champaign–Urbana–Danville, IL CSA
Macon-Bibb County, GA MSA	238,553	233,802	+2.03%	+4,751	Macon-Bibb County–Warner Robins, GA CSA
Bellingham, WA MSA	236,392	226,847	+4.21%	+9,545	
Fort Smith, AR-OK MSA	234,140	227,213	+3.05%	+6,927	
Barnstable Town, MA MSA	233,539	228,996	+1.98%	+4,543	Boston–Worcester–Providence, MA-RI-NH CSA
Topeka, KS MSA	233,052	233,152	−0.04%	-100	
Rochester, MN MSA	231,184	226,329	+2.15%	+4,855	Rochester–Austin–Winona, MN CSA
Panama City–Panama City Beach, FL MSA	231,174	200,534	+15.28%	+30,640	
Las Cruces, NM MSA	229,091	219,561	+4.34%	+9,530	El Paso–Las Cruces, TX-NM CSA
Charlottesville, VA MSA	228,597	221,524	+3.19%	+7,073	
Lafayette–West Lafayette, IN MSA	228,468	223,716	+2.12%	+4,752	Lafayette–West Lafayette–Frankfort, IN CSA
Lake Havasu City–Kingman, AZ MSA	228,102	213,267	+6.96%	+14,835	
Burlington–South Burlington, VT MSA	227,803	225,562	+0.99%	+2,241	Burlington–South Burlington–Barre, VT CSA
Gainesville, GA MSA	226,568	203,136	+11.54%	+23,432	Atlanta–Athens-Clarke County–Sandy Springs, GA-AL CSA
Yuma, AZ MSA	224,449	203,881	+10.09%	+20,568	
Athens-Clarke County, GA MSA	224,148	215,415	+4.05%	+8,733	Atlanta–Athens-Clarke County–Sandy Springs, GA-AL CSA
Monroe, LA MSA	222,390	227,147	−2.09%	-4,757	Monroe–Ruston, LA CSA
Medford, OR MSA	221,795	223,259	−0.66%	-1,464	Medford–Grants Pass, OR CSA
Columbia, MO MSA	219,062	210,864	+3.89%	+8,198	Columbia–Jefferson City–Moberly, MO CSA
Punta Gorda, FL MSA	217,212	186,847	+16.25%	+30,365	North Port–Bradenton, FL CSA
Jacksonville, NC MSA	217,175	204,576	+6.16%	+12,599	
Johnson City, TN MSA	216,416	207,285	+4.41%	+9,131	Johnson City–Kingsport–Bristol, TN-VA CSA
St. George, UT MSA	213,670	180,279	+18.52%	+33,391	
Lexington Park, MD MSA	211,176	206,560	+2.23%	+4,616	Washington–Baltimore–Arlington, DC-MD-VA-WV-PA CSA
Chico, CA MSA	209,211	211,632	−1.14%	-2,421	
Joplin, MO-KS MSA	208,796	200,771	+4.00%	+8,025	Joplin–Miami, MO-OK-KS CSA
Elkhart–Goshen, IN MSA	208,774	207,047	+0.83%	+1,727	South Bend–Elkhart–Mishawaka, IN-MI CSA
Warner Robins, GA MSA	208,091	191,614	+8.60%	+16,477	Macon-Bibb County–Warner Robins, GA CSA
Auburn–Opelika, AL MSA	208,013	193,773	+7.35%	+14,240	Columbus–Auburn–Opelika, GA-AL CSA
Springfield, IL MSA	206,033	208,640	−1.25%	-2,607	Springfield–Jacksonville–Lincoln, IL CSA
St. Cloud, MN MSA	205,854	199,671	+3.10%	+6,183	Minneapolis–St. Paul, MN-WI CSA
Florence, SC MSA	201,392	199,964	+0.71%	+1,428	
Charleston, WV MSA	200,170	210,605	−4.95%	-10,435	Charleston–Huntington–Ashland, WV-OH-KY CSA
Houma–Bayou Cane–Thibodaux, LA MSA	199,668	207,137	−3.61%	-7,469	
Racine–Mount Pleasant, WI MSA	198,919	197,727	+0.60%	+1,192	Milwaukee–Racine–Waukesha, WI CSA
Bowling Green, KY MSA	197,180	179,639	+9.76%	+17,541	Bowling Green–Glasgow–Franklin, KY CSA
Dover, DE MSA	194,786	181,851	+7.11%	+12,935	Philadelphia–Reading–Camden, PA-NJ-DE-MD CSA
Billings, MT MSA	193,603	184,167	+5.12%	+9,436	
Midland, TX MSA	193,139	175,220	+10.23%	+17,919	Midland–Odessa–Andrews, TX CSA
Coeur d'Alene, ID MSA	191,864	171,362	+11.96%	+20,502	Spokane–Spokane Valley–Coeur d'Alene, WA-ID CSA
Saginaw, MI MSA	187,688	190,124	−1.28%	-2,436	Saginaw–Midland–Bay City, MI CSA
Yuba City, CA MSA	187,478	181,208	+3.46%	+6,270	Sacramento–Roseville, CA CSA
Burlington, NC MSA	186,177	171,415	+8.61%	+14,762	Greensboro–Winston-Salem–High Point, NC CSA
Abilene, TX MSA	185,429	176,579	+5.01%	+8,850	Abilene–Sweetwater, TX CSA
Jackson, TN MSA	184,569	180,504	+2.25%	+4,065	
Kingston, NY MSA	183,330	181,851	+0.81%	+1,479	New York–Newark, NY-NJ-CT-PA CSA
Greenville, NC MSA	182,936	170,243	+7.46%	+12,693	Greenville–Washington, NC CSA
Iowa City, IA MSA	182,711	175,419	+4.16%	+7,292	Cedar Rapids–Iowa City, IA CSA
Redding, CA MSA	181,648	182,155	−0.28%	-507	Redding–Red Bluff, CA CSA
Blacksburg–Christiansburg–Radford, VA MSA	181,616	181,854	−0.13%	-238	
El Centro, CA MSA	181,411	179,702	+0.95%	+1,709	
Muskegon–Norton Shores, MI MSA	177,901	175,824	+1.18%	+2,077	Grand Rapids–Wyoming, MI CSA
Eau Claire, WI MSA	176,647	172,007	+2.70%	+4,640	Eau Claire–Menomonie, WI CSA
Oshkosh–Neenah, WI MSA	174,218	171,730	+1.45%	+2,488	Appleton–Oshkosh–Neenah, WI CSA
Idaho Falls, ID MSA	173,851	157,429	+10.43%	+16,422	Idaho Falls–Rexburg–Blackfoot, ID CSA
Odessa, TX MSA	173,801	165,171	+5.22%	+8,630	Midland–Odessa–Andrews, TX CSA
Sebastian–Vero Beach–West Vero Corridor, FL MSA	172,799	159,788	+8.14%	+13,011	Miami–Port St. Lucie–Fort Lauderdale, FL CSA
Homosassa Springs, FL MSA	171,666	153,843	+11.59%	+17,823	
Bloomington, IL MSA	171,419	170,954	+0.27%	+465	Bloomington–Pontiac, IL CSA
La Crosse–Onalaska, WI-MN MSA	171,182	170,341	+0.49%	+841	La Crosse–Onalaska–Sparta, WI-MN CSA
Pueblo, CO MSA	169,277	168,162	+0.66%	+1,115	Pueblo–Cañon City, CO CSA
Terre Haute, IN MSA	169,241	168,875	+0.22%	+366	
Waterloo–Cedar Falls, IA MSA	169,189	168,461	+0.43%	+728	
Kenosha, WI MSA	168,448	169,151	−0.42%	-703	Chicago–Naperville, IL-IN-WI CSA
Janesville–Beloit, WI MSA	166,472	163,687	+1.70%	+2,785	Madison–Janesville–Beloit, WI CSA
Bloomington, IN MSA	165,231	161,039	+2.60%	+4,192	Bloomington–Bedford, IN CSA
Amherst Town–Northampton, MA MSA	164,065	162,308	+1.08%	+1,757	Springfield–Amherst Town–Northampton, MA CSA
Grand Junction, CO MSA	162,845	155,703	+4.59%	+7,142	
Logan, UT-ID MSA	160,889	147,348	+9.19%	+13,541	
Kahului–Wailuku, HI MSA	160,674	164,836	−2.52%	-4,162	
Chambersburg, PA MSA	160,652	155,932	+3.03%	+4,720	Washington–Baltimore–Arlington, DC-MD-VA-WV-PA CSA
Decatur, AL MSA	160,326	156,494	+2.45%	+3,832	Huntsville–Decatur–Albertville, AL-TN CSA
Jackson, MI MSA	159,552	160,366	−0.51%	-814	
Hattiesburg, MS MSA	158,014	153,891	+2.68%	+4,123	Hattiesburg–Laurel, MS CSA
Bangor, ME MSA	157,967	152,199	+3.79%	+5,768	
Wildwood–The Villages, FL MSA	157,772	129,752	+21.60%	+28,020	Orlando–Lakeland–Deltona, FL CSA
State College, PA MSA	157,393	158,172	−0.49%	-779	State College–DuBois, PA CSA
Vineland, NJ MSA	157,148	154,152	+1.94%	+2,996	Philadelphia–Reading–Camden, PA-NJ-DE-MD CSA
Traverse City, MI MSA	156,972	153,448	+2.30%	+3,524	
Rapid City, SD MSA	156,934	147,392	+6.47%	+9,542	Rapid City–Spearfish, SD CSA
Santa Fe, NM MSA	156,907	154,823	+1.35%	+2,084	Albuquerque–Santa Fe–Los Alamos, NM CSA
Florence–Muscle Shoals, AL MSA	156,609	150,791	+3.86%	+5,818	Florence–Muscle Shoals–Russellville, AL CSA
Dothan, AL MSA	156,266	151,007	+3.48%	+5,259	Dothan–Enterprise–Ozark, AL CSA
Monroe, MI MSA	156,004	154,809	+0.77%	+1,195	Detroit–Warren–Ann Arbor, MI CSA
Hanford–Corcoran, CA MSA	154,327	152,486	+1.21%	+1,841	Fresno–Hanford–Corcoran, CA CSA
Sherman–Denison, TX MSA	153,613	135,543	+13.33%	+18,070	Dallas–Fort Worth, TX-OK CSA
Valdosta, GA MSA	153,276	148,126	+3.48%	+5,150	
Jefferson City, MO MSA	152,712	150,309	+1.60%	+2,403	Columbia–Jefferson City–Moberly, MO CSA
Niles, MI MSA	152,444	154,316	−1.21%	-1,872	South Bend–Elkhart–Mishawaka, IN-MI CSA
Winchester, VA-WV MSA	152,332	142,632	+6.80%	+9,700	Washington–Baltimore–Arlington, DC-MD-VA-WV-PA CSA
Wichita Falls, TX MSA	149,448	148,128	+0.89%	+1,320	
Rocky Mount, NC MSA	148,486	143,870	+3.21%	+4,616	Rocky Mount–Wilson–Roanoke Rapids, NC CSA
Alexandria, LA MSA	147,952	152,192	−2.79%	-4,240	
Dalton, GA MSA	147,819	142,837	+3.49%	+4,982	Chattanooga–Cleveland–Dalton, TN-GA-AL CSA
Texarkana, TX-AR MSA	146,816	147,519	−0.48%	-703	
Lebanon, PA MSA	146,380	143,257	+2.18%	+3,123	Harrisburg–York–Lebanon, PA CSA
Sioux City, IA-NE-SD MSA	145,738	144,334	+0.97%	+1,404	Sioux City–Le Mars, IA-NE-SD CSA
Albany, GA MSA	145,510	148,922	−2.29%	-3,412	
Flagstaff, AZ MSA	144,368	145,101	−0.51%	-733	
Morgantown, WV MSA	141,995	140,038	+1.40%	+1,957	
Hammond, LA MSA	141,346	133,157	+6.15%	+8,189	Baton Rouge–Hammond, LA CSA
Harrisonburg, VA MSA	140,155	135,571	+3.38%	+4,584	Harrisonburg–Staunton–Stuarts Draft, VA CSA
Bismarck, ND MSA	139,750	133,626	+4.58%	+6,124	
Jonesboro, AR MSA	139,440	134,196	+3.91%	+5,244	Jonesboro–Paragould, AR CSA
Wausau, WI MSA	139,432	138,013	+1.03%	+1,419	Wausau–Stevens Point–Wisconsin Rapids, WI CSA
Manhattan, KS MSA	136,122	134,046	+1.55%	+2,076	
Springfield, OH MSA	135,340	136,001	−0.49%	-661	Dayton–Springfield–Kettering, OH CSA
Wheeling, WV-OH MSA	134,089	139,513	−3.89%	-5,424	
Cleveland, TN MSA	134,057	126,164	+6.26%	+7,893	Chattanooga–Cleveland–Dalton, TN-GA-AL CSA
Battle Creek, MI MSA	133,408	134,310	−0.67%	-902	Kalamazoo–Battle Creek–Portage, MI CSA
Mount Vernon–Anacortes, WA MSA	132,975	129,523	+2.67%	+3,452	Seattle–Tacoma, WA CSA
Napa, CA MSA	132,949	138,019	−3.67%	-5,070	San Jose–San Francisco–Oakland, CA CSA
Albany, OR MSA	132,843	128,610	+3.29%	+4,233	Portland–Vancouver–Salem, OR-WA CSA
Salisbury, MD MSA	131,872	128,208	+2.86%	+3,664	Salisbury–Ocean Pines, MD CSA
Staunton–Stuarts Draft, VA MSA	129,692	125,433	+3.40%	+4,259	Harrisonburg–Staunton–Stuarts Draft, VA CSA
Johnstown, PA MSA	128,968	133,472	−3.37%	-4,504	Johnstown–Somerset, PA CSA
Morristown, TN MSA	128,867	119,182	+8.13%	+9,685	Knoxville–Morristown–Sevierville, TN CSA
Bozeman, MT MSA	128,740	118,960	+8.22%	+9,780	
Missoula, MT MSA	128,698	122,457	+5.10%	+6,241	
Elizabethtown, KY MSA	128,666	125,569	+2.47%	+3,097	Louisville/Jefferson County–Elizabethtown, KY-IN CSA
Wenatchee–East Wenatchee, WA MSA	128,414	122,012	+5.25%	+6,402	
Pittsfield, MA MSA	128,224	129,026	−0.62%	-802	
Ames, IA MSA	128,090	125,252	+2.27%	+2,838	Des Moines–West Des Moines–Ames, IA CSA
Lawton, OK MSA	127,590	126,652	+0.74%	+938	Lawton–Duncan, OK CSA
Sierra Vista–Douglas, AZ MSA	126,332	125,447	+0.71%	+885	
Mansfield, OH MSA	124,893	124,936	−0.03%	-43	Mansfield–Ashland–Bucyrus, OH CSA
Glens Falls, NY MSA	124,373	127,039	−2.10%	-2,666	Albany–Schenectady, NY CSA
Twin Falls, ID MSA	123,901	114,283	+8.42%	+9,618	
Goldsboro, NC MSA	122,278	117,333	+4.21%	+4,945	
San Angelo, TX MSA	122,065	121,516	+0.45%	+549	
Lawrence, KS MSA	120,920	118,785	+1.80%	+2,135	Kansas City–Overland Park–Kansas City, MO-KS CSA
Farmington, NM MSA	120,340	121,661	−1.09%	-1,321	
Altoona, PA MSA	119,541	122,822	−2.67%	-3,281	Altoona–Huntingdon, PA CSA
St. Joseph, MO-KS MSA	119,170	121,467	−1.89%	-2,297	Kansas City–Overland Park–Kansas City, MO-KS CSA
Brunswick–St. Simons, GA MSA	118,524	113,495	+4.43%	+5,029	
Sheboygan, WI MSA	118,047	118,034	+0.01%	+13	
Lewiston–Auburn, ME MSA	116,487	111,139	+4.81%	+5,348	Portland–Lewiston–South Portland, ME CSA
Anniston–Oxford, AL MSA	115,834	116,441	−0.52%	-607	
Longview–Kelso, WA MSA	114,885	110,730	+3.75%	+4,155	Portland–Vancouver–Salem, OR-WA CSA
Owensboro, KY MSA	113,962	112,464	+1.33%	+1,498	
Muncie, IN MSA	113,106	111,903	+1.08%	+1,203	Indianapolis–Carmel–Muncie, IN CSA
Sandusky, OH MSA	112,777	115,986	−2.77%	-3,209	Cleveland–Akron–Canton, OH CSA
Williamsport, PA MSA	112,587	114,188	−1.40%	-1,601	Williamsport–Lock Haven, PA CSA
Weirton–Steubenville, WV-OH MSA	112,468	116,903	−3.79%	-4,435	Pittsburgh–Weirton–Steubenville, PA-OH-WV CSA
Watertown–Fort Drum, NY MSA	111,540	116,721	−4.44%	-5,181	
Michigan City–La Porte, IN MSA	111,294	112,417	−1.00%	-1,123	Chicago–Naperville, IL-IN-WI CSA
Sebring, FL MSA	111,122	101,235	+9.77%	+9,887	
Pinehurst–Southern Pines, NC MSA	110,619	99,727	+10.92%	+10,892	Fayetteville–Lumberton–Pinehurst, NC CSA
Beckley, WV MSA	109,940	115,079	−4.47%	-5,139	
Gettysburg, PA MSA	107,594	103,852	+3.60%	+3,742	Harrisburg–York–Lebanon, PA CSA
Kankakee, IL MSA	105,525	107,502	−1.84%	-1,977	Chicago–Naperville, IL-IN-WI CSA
Sumter, SC MSA	105,067	105,556	−0.46%	-489	Columbia–Sumter–Orangeburg, SC CSA
Grand Forks, ND-MN MSA	105,046	104,362	+0.66%	+684	
Mankato, MN MSA	104,907	103,566	+1.29%	+1,341	Mankato–New Ulm, MN CSA
Fond du Lac, WI MSA	104,669	104,154	+0.49%	+515	
Ithaca, NY MSA	104,047	105,740	−1.60%	-1,693	Ithaca–Cortland, NY CSA
Gadsden, AL MSA	103,886	103,436	+0.44%	+450	
Cheyenne, WY MSA	102,938	100,512	+2.41%	+2,426	
Paducah, KY-IL MSA	102,259	103,486	−1.19%	-1,227	Paducah–Mayfield, KY-IL CSA
Bay City, MI MSA	102,123	103,856	−1.67%	-1,733	Saginaw–Midland–Bay City, MI CSA
Rome, GA MSA	101,378	98,584	+2.83%	+2,794	Atlanta–Athens-Clarke County–Sandy Springs, GA-AL CSA
Lima, OH MSA	100,881	102,206	−1.30%	-1,325	Lima–Van Wert–Celina, OH CSA
Victoria, TX MSA	99,864	98,331	+1.56%	+1,533	Victoria–Port Lavaca, TX CSA
Hot Springs, AR MSA	99,695	100,180	−0.48%	-485	Hot Springs–Malvern, AR CSA
Dubuque, IA MSA	99,381	99,266	+0.12%	+115	
Decatur, IL MSA	99,300	103,998	−4.52%	-4,698	
Cape Girardeau, MO-IL MSA	99,215	97,517	+1.74%	+1,698	Cape Girardeau–Sikeston, MO-IL CSA
Corvallis, OR MSA	97,728	95,184	+2.67%	+2,544	Portland–Vancouver–Salem, OR-WA CSA
Helena, MT MSA	97,153	89,832	+8.15%	+7,321	
Fairbanks–College, AK MSA	93,972	95,655	−1.76%	-1,683	
Hinesville, GA MSA	91,870	81,424	+12.83%	+10,446	Savannah–Hinesville–Statesboro, GA CSA
Pocatello, ID MSA	91,591	87,018	+5.26%	+4,573	
Grants Pass, OR MSA	87,867	88,090	−0.25%	-223	Medford–Grants Pass, OR CSA
Parkersburg–Vienna, WV MSA	87,264	89,490	−2.49%	-2,226	Parkersburg–Marietta–Vienna, WV-OH CSA
Columbus, IN MSA	85,729	82,208	+4.28%	+3,521	Indianapolis–Carmel–Muncie, IN CSA
Great Falls, MT MSA	85,029	84,414	+0.73%	+615	
Kokomo, IN MSA	83,904	83,658	+0.29%	+246	Indianapolis–Carmel–Muncie, IN CSA
Midland, MI MSA	83,754	83,494	+0.31%	+260	Saginaw–Midland–Bay City, MI CSA
Casper, WY MSA	80,526	79,955	+0.71%	+571	
Elmira, NY MSA	80,415	84,148	−4.44%	-3,733	Elmira–Corning, NY CSA
Grand Island, NE MSA	78,076	77,038	+1.35%	+1,038	
Minot, ND MSA	75,694	77,546	−2.39%	-1,852	
Lewiston, ID-WA MSA	65,450	64,375	+1.67%	+1,075	
Walla Walla, WA MSA	62,361	62,584	−0.36%	-223	Kennewick–Richland-Walla Walla, WA CSA
Enid, OK MSA	61,779	62,846	−1.70%	-1,067	
Eagle Pass, TX MSA	58,823	57,887	+1.62%	+936	
Carson City, NV MSA	58,571	58,639	−0.12%	-68	Reno–Carson City–Gardnerville Ranchos, NV-CA CSA

== Puerto Rico ==
This sortable table lists the six metropolitan statistical areas (MSAs) of Puerto Rico including:

1. The MSA rank by population as of July 1, 2025, as estimated by the United States Census Bureau
2. The MSA name as designated by the United States Office of Management and Budget
3. The MSA population as of July 1, 2025, as estimated by the United States Census Bureau
4. The MSA population as of April 1, 2020, as enumerated by the 2020 United States census
5. The percent MSA population change from April 1, 2020, to July 1, 2025
6. The combined statistical area (CSA) if the MSA is a component

The six metropolitan statistical areas of the Commonwealth of Puerto Rico
Rank	Metropolitan statistical area	2025 estimate	2020 census	Change	Encompassing combined statistical area
1	San Juan–Bayamón–Caguas, PR MSA	2,024,195	2,081,265	−2.74%	San Juan–Bayamón, PR Combined Statistical Area
2	Ponce, PR MSA	262,792	278,477	−5.63%	Ponce–Coamo, PR Combined Statistical Area
3	Aguadilla, PR MSA	250,088	253,768	−1.45%	Mayagüez–Aguadilla, PR Combined Statistical Area
4	Mayagüez, PR MSA	206,355	213,831	−3.50%	Mayagüez–Aguadilla, PR Combined Statistical Area
5	Arecibo, PR MSA	179,229	182,705	−1.90%	San Juan–Bayamón, PR Combined Statistical Area
6	Guayama, PR MSA	63,864	68,442	−6.69%	San Juan–Bayamón, PR Combined Statistical Area

== See also ==
- United States of America
  - Outline of the United States
- Demographics of the United States
  - United States Census Bureau
    - List of U.S. states and territories by population
    - List of United States cities by population
    - List of United States counties and county equivalents
  - United States Office of Management and Budget
    - Statistical area (United States)
      - Combined statistical area
      - Core-based statistical area (list)
        - Micropolitan statistical area
