= Gillis, Louisiana =

- Census-designated place
- Location within Louisiana
- Coordinates: 30°22′25″N 93°12′00″W
- Country: United States
- State: Louisiana
- Parish: Calcasieu Parish

Area
  - Total: 1.67 sq mi (4.32 km^{2})
  - Land: 1.67 sq mi (4.32 km^{2})
  - Water: 0 sq mi (0.00 km^{2})
- Elevation: 26 ft (7.9 m)

Population (2020)
  - Total: 800
  - Density: 479.7/sq mi (185.23/km^{2})
- Time zone: UTC-6 (CST)
  - Summer (DST): UTC-5 (CDT)
- FIPS code: 22-29045
- GNIS feature ID: 2586682

Gillis is an unincorporated community and census-designated place (CDP) in northern Calcasieu Parish, Louisiana, United States. As of the 2020 census, Gillis had a population of 800.

== Geography ==
Gillis is located in northeastern Calcasieu Parish, 07 miles (11 km) north of Lake Charles and 36 miles (58 km) south of DeRidder. U.S. Route 171 is the main road through the community.

Gillis falls under the school district of Iowa, a town 20 miles (32 km) to the southeast, though most parents send their children to schools much closer to home. Students who live in the Gillis community may attend Gillis Elementary on Topsy Road and Moss Bluff Middle School and Sam Houston High School in Moss Bluff.

== Demographics ==
Historical population
Census	Pop.	Note	%±
2010	657		—
2020	800		21.8%
U.S. Decennial Census

Gillis was first listed as a census designated place in the 2010 U.S. census.
