= San Germán–Cabo Rojo metropolitan area =

US Census Bureau defined Metropolitan Statistical Area (MSA) in southwestern Puerto Rico

The San Germán–Cabo Rojo Metropolitan Statistical Area was a United States Census Bureau defined Metropolitan Statistical Area (MSA) in southwestern Puerto Rico. A July 1, 2009 Census Bureau estimate placed the population at 148,559, a 9.06% increase over the 2000 census figure of 136,212.

San Germán-Cabo Rojo was the fourth largest metropolitan area (by population) in Puerto Rico and is the second fastest growing MSA, after Aguadilla–Isabela–San Sebastián, in the Commonwealth.

== Municipalities ==
A total of four municipalities (Spanish: municipios) were included as part of the San Germán-Cabo Rojo Metropolitan Statistical Area.

- Cabo Rojo (Principal city)
- San Germán (Principal city)
- Lajas
- Sabana Grande

== Combined Statistical Area ==
In the 2023 statistical area definitions, the San Germán–Cabo Rojo, PR MSA was disbanded and merged with the pre-existing Mayagüez, PR MSA. In turn, this merged MSA was combined with the adjacent Aguadilla, PR MSA to form the Mayagüez–Aguadilla, PR Combined Statistical Area (CSA). The newly defined CSA comprises thirteen municipios on Puerto Rico's western coast.

== See also ==
- Puerto Rico census statistical areas
