= Aguadilla metropolitan area =

Metropolitan statistical area (MSA) in northwestern Puerto Rico

Aguadilla metropolitan area Área metropolitana de Aguadilla
- Metropolitan area
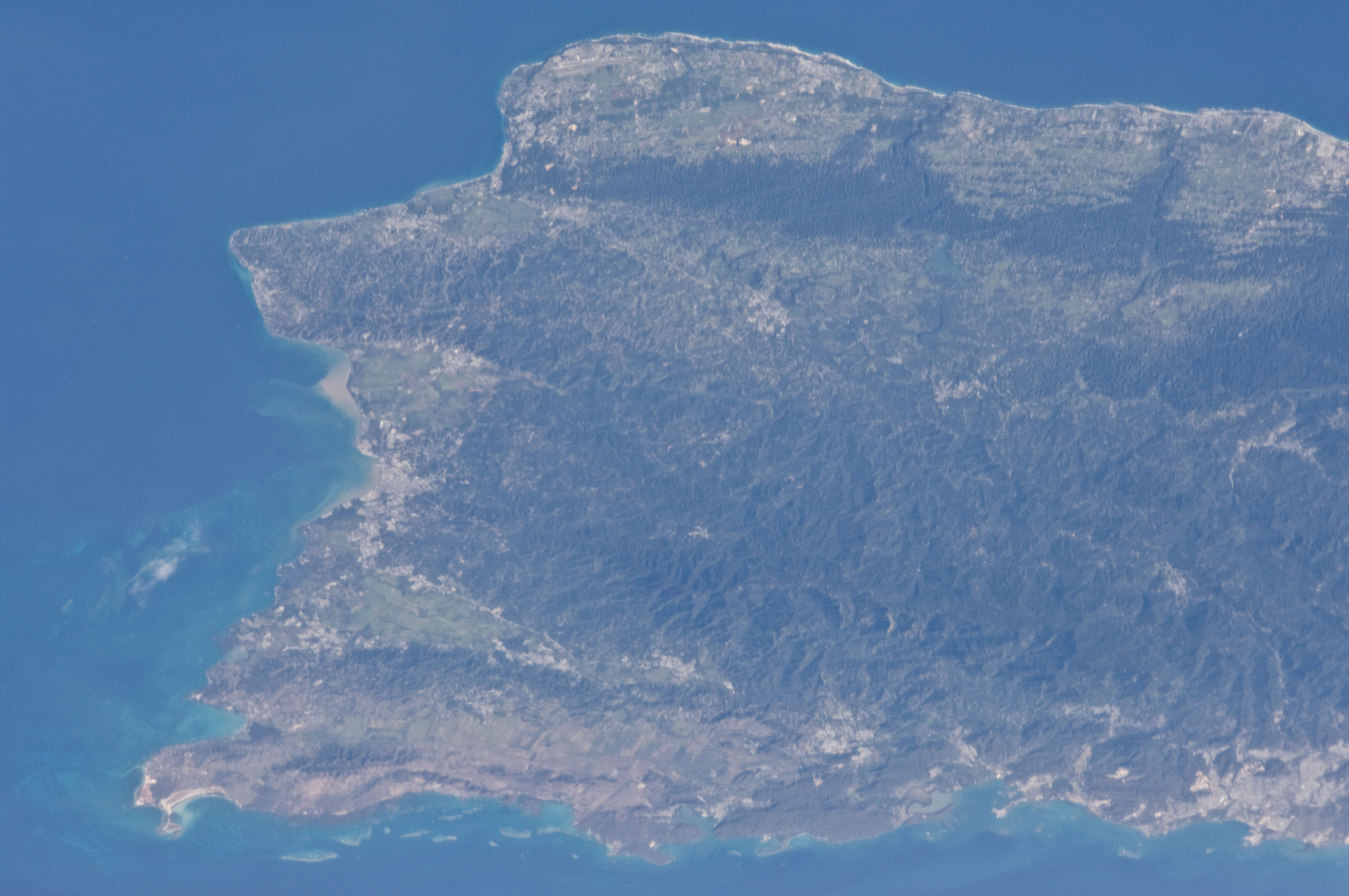
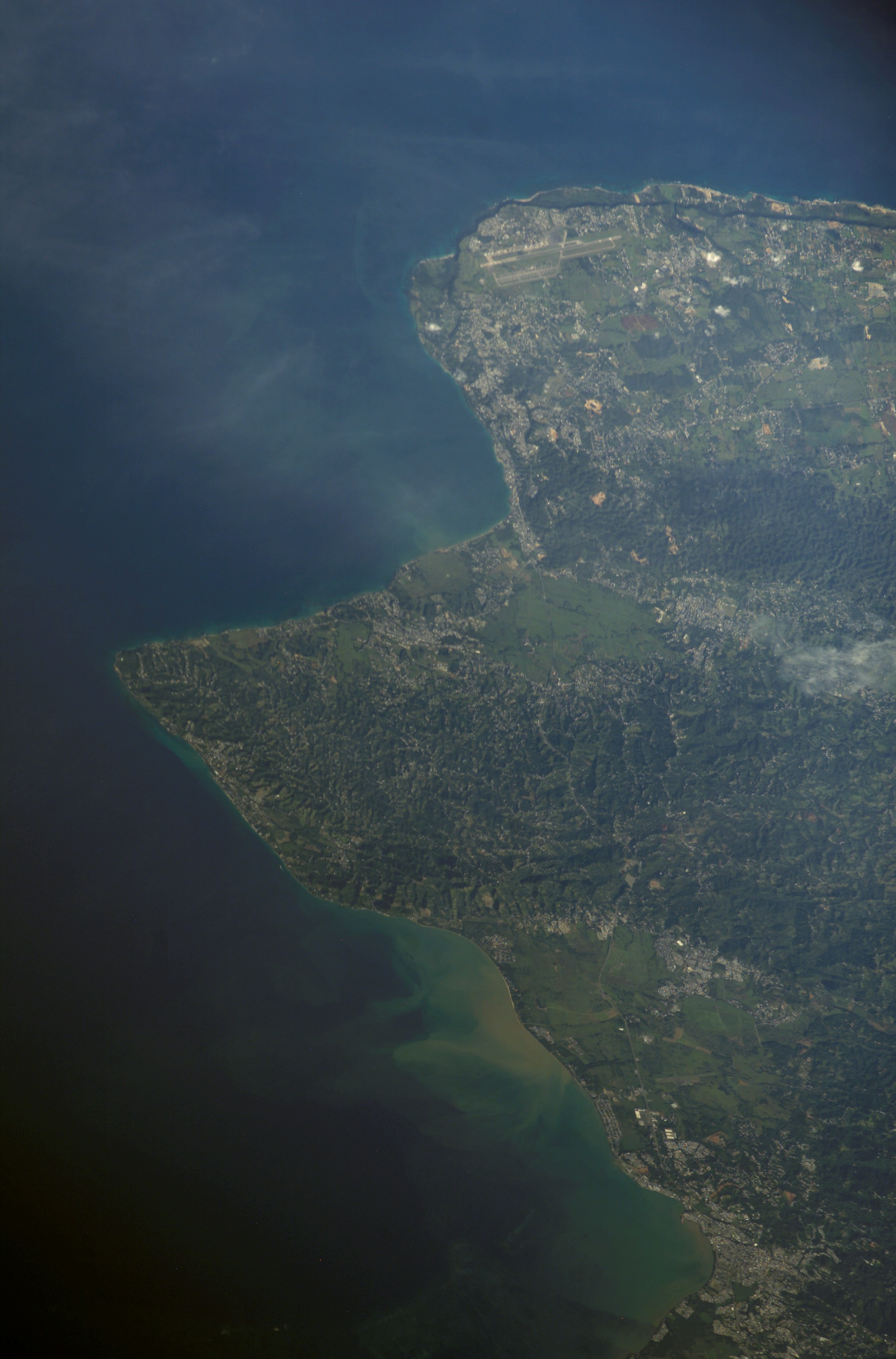
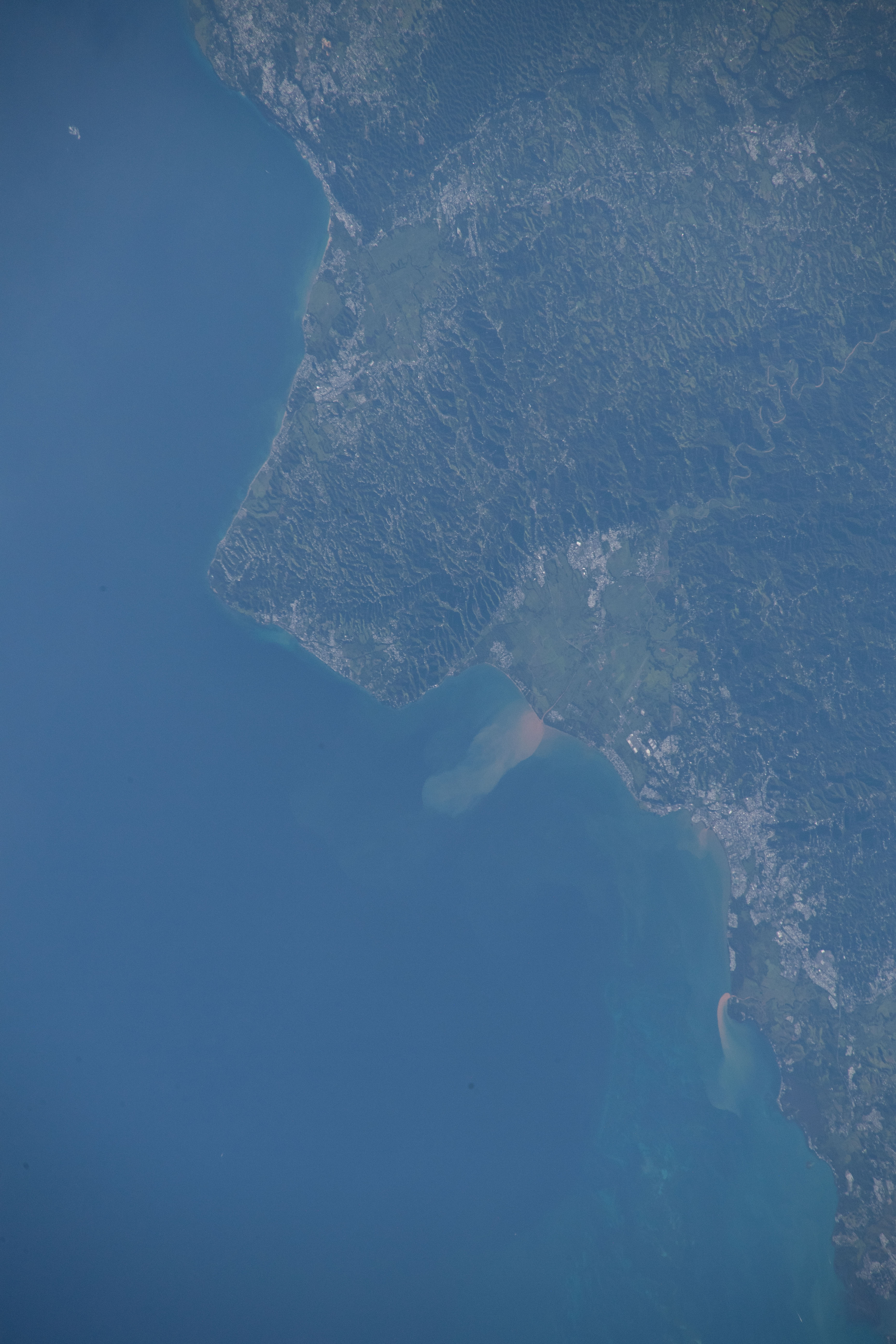
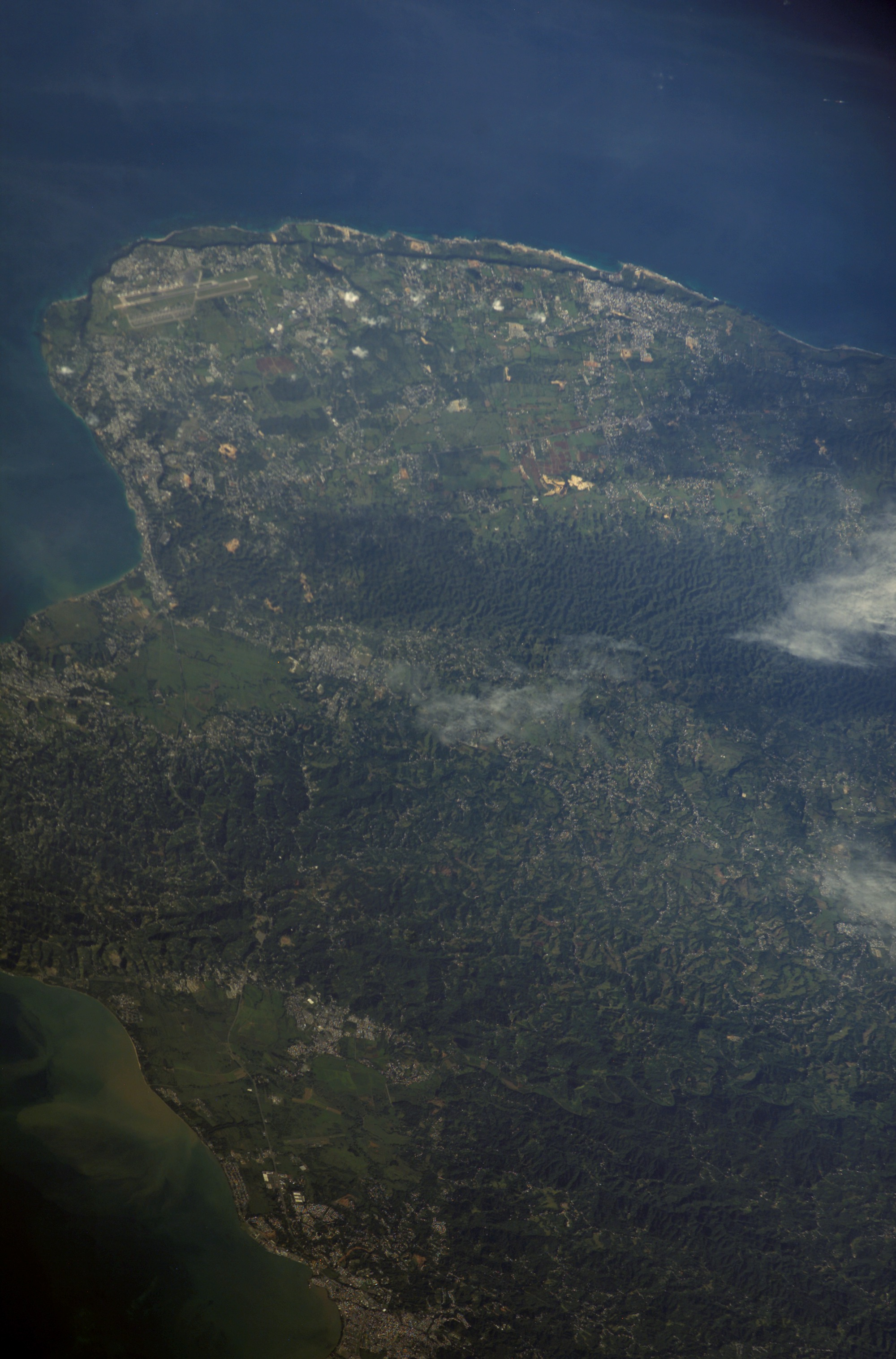
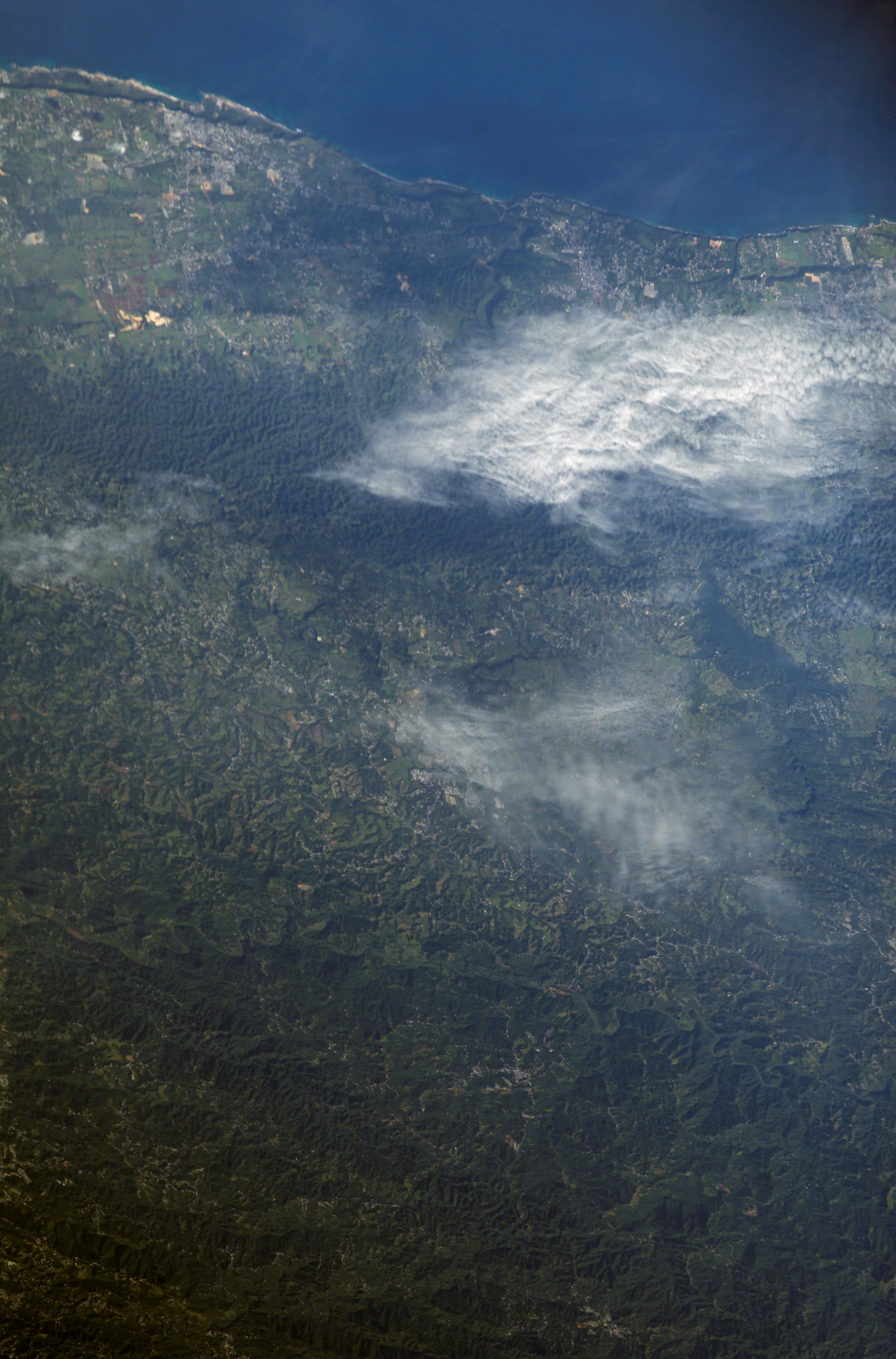
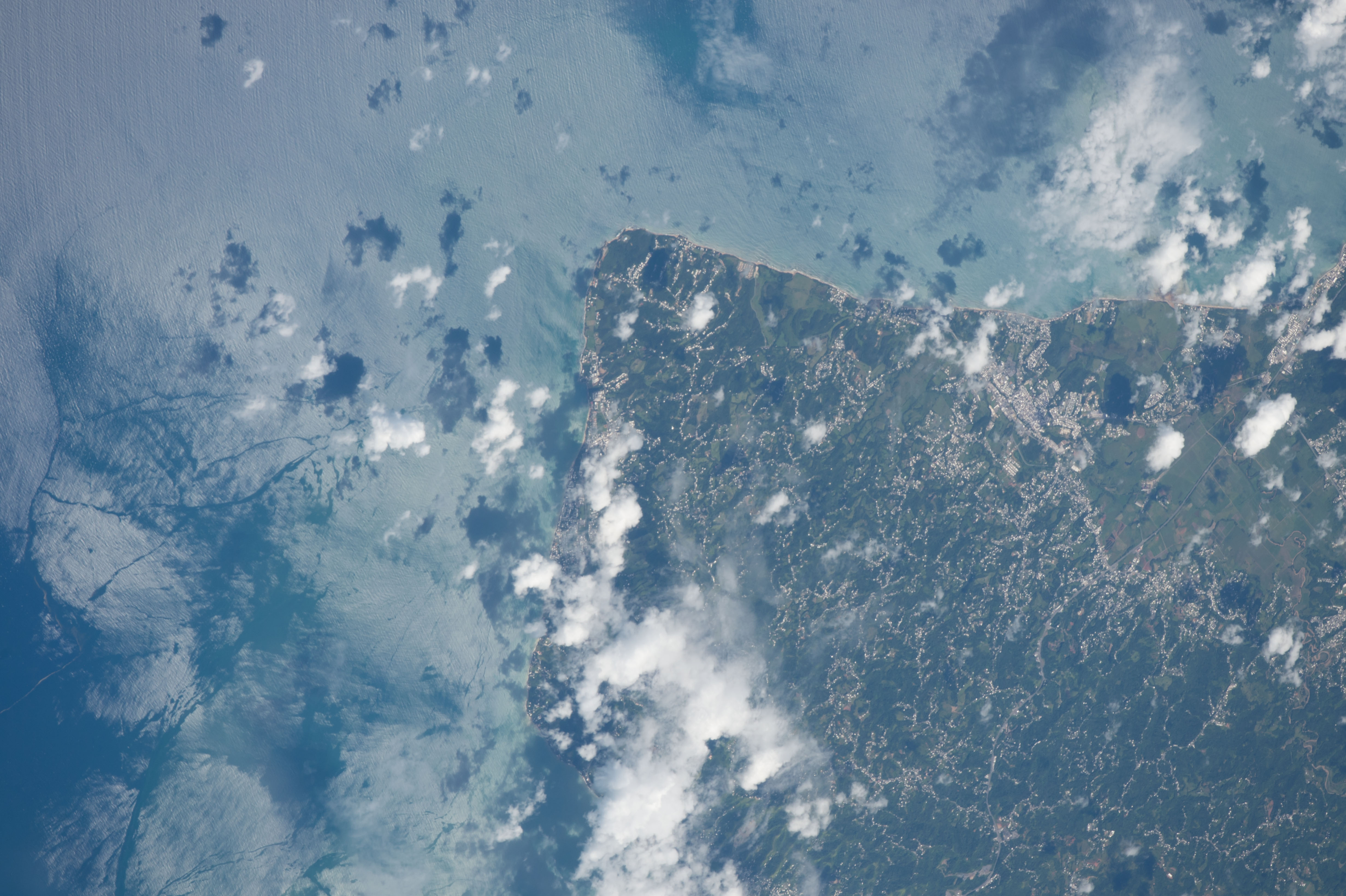
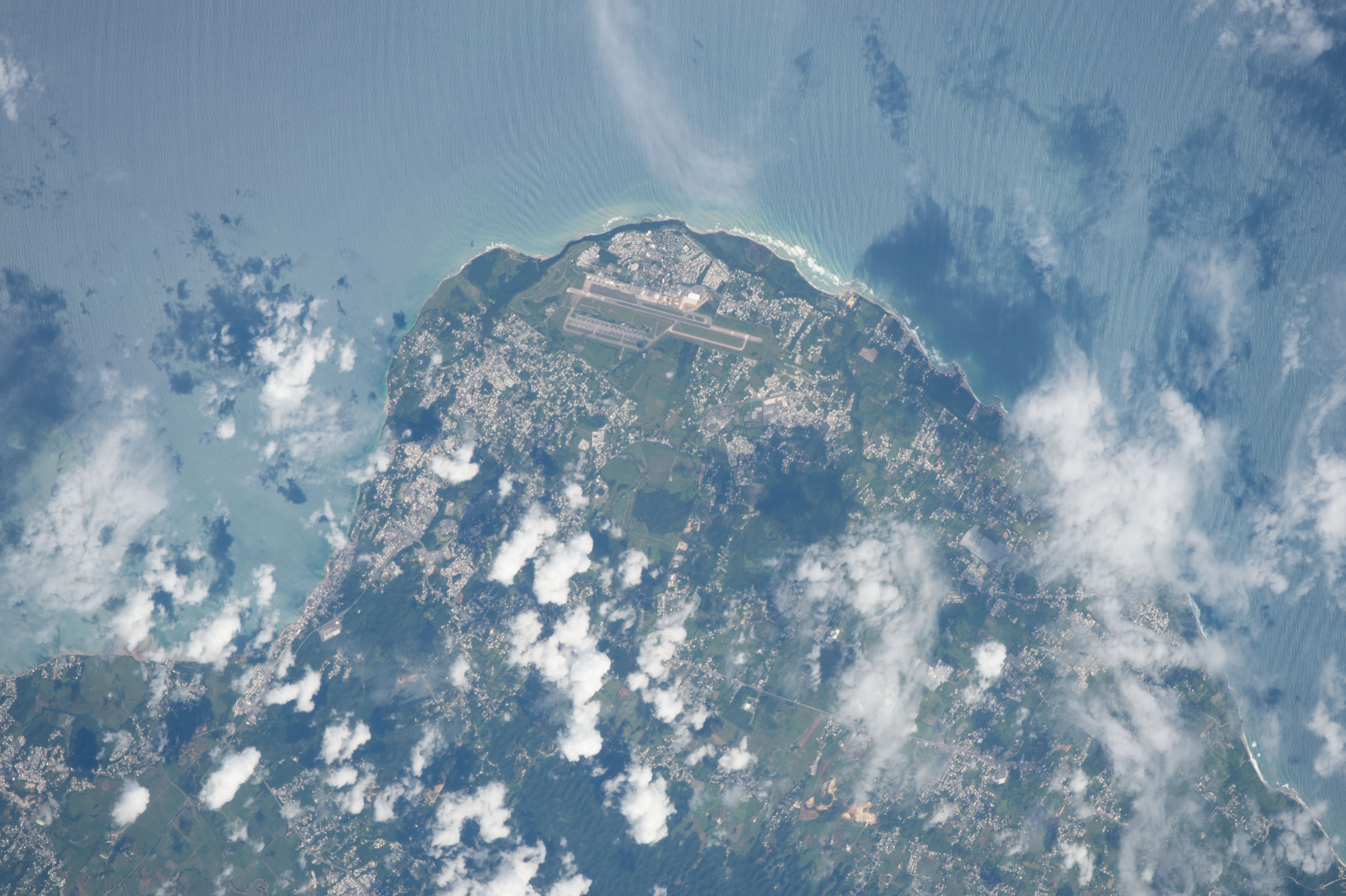
- Aguadilla metropolitan area in northwestern Puerto Rico Aguadilla to Mayagüez Aguda, Rincón and Añasco Aguadilla and Moca Isabela and San Sebastián Punta Higüero in Rincón Punta Borinquén in Aguadilla

- Map of Puerto Rico with urban areas demarcated in orange to yellow
Statistical areas in Puerto Rico
Aguadilla MSA within Mayagüez–Aguadilla CSA
Mayagüez MSA within Mayagüez–Aguadilla CSA
Other Statistical Areas in Puerto Rico: San Juan–Bayamón–Caguas MSA, Arecibo MSA, Guayama MSA, Lares μSA, Utuado μSA, Coco μSA within the San Juan–Bayamón CSA, and Ponce MSA and Coamo μSA within the Ponce–Coamo CSA
Municipalities outside statistical areas
- Country: United States
- Territory: Puerto Rico
- Principal cities: Aguadilla

Population (2023)
  - Total: 250,435
- Time zone: UTC−4
  - Summer (DST): AST

The Aguadilla metropolitan area (Spanish: área metropolitana de Aguadilla), is the third largest metropolitan statistical area (MSA) in Puerto Rico, comprising the municipalities of Aguadilla, Isabela, San Sebastián, Aguada, Moca, Añasco, and Rincón between the coastal plains, the Northern Karst Belt, and the Cordillera Central mountain subrange in the northwestern region of the main island. One of 6 metropolitan statistical areas in Puerto Rico, it lies within the Mayagüez–Aguadilla combined statistical area (CSA), which is one of 3 primary statistical areas in the main island as defined by the United States Census Bureau. As of 2023, census estimates place the population of the Aguadilla metropolitan area at 250,435.

== Aguadilla metropolitan area ==
With an estimated population of 250,435 as of 2023, the Aguadilla metropolitan area (MSA) is the third most populous in Puerto Rico, covering 7 of 78 municipalities in the northwestern region of the main island. Aguadilla is considered to be its principal city. The Aguadilla metropolitan area is the 195th most populated in the United States between the Daphne–Fairhope–Foley, AL MSA and the Prescott Valley–Prescott, AZ MSA.

=== Municipalities ===
- Aguadilla metropolitan statistical area (MSA) (7 municipalities)
  - Aguadilla Pop: 53,622
  - Isabela Pop: 42,794
  - San Sebastián Pop: 38,926
  - Aguada Pop: 37,528
  - Moca Pop: 37,325
  - Añasco Pop: 24,815
  - Rincón Pop: 15,425

=== Topography ===

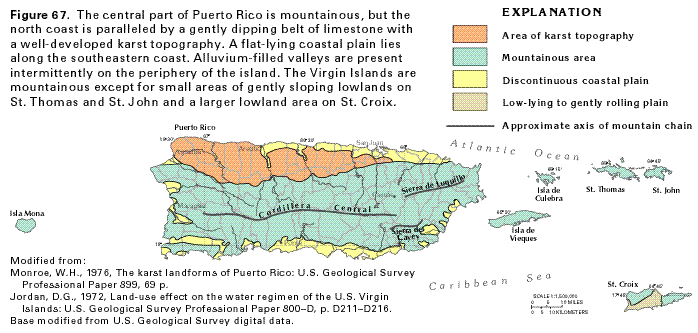
General physiographic map of Puerto Rico, with mountainous terrain in green, karst in orange, and plains in yellow

Comprising Aguadilla, Isabela, San Sebastián, Aguada, Moca, and Añasco, and Rincón, the Aguadilla metropolitan area is situated between the western and northern coastal plains, the Añasco Valley, Culebrinas Valley, the Northern Karst Belt, and the Cordillera Central mountain subrange in the northwestern region of the main island of Puerto Rico.

All municipalities have an urbanized, densely populated downtown area and administrative center, categorized as a barrio and known as a pueblo, and concentrated urbanized residential areas with large populations, especially along the coastlines of Rincón, Aguadilla, and Isabela. All municipales have rural areas, particularly those that lie on karstic and mountainous terrain like Moca and San Sebastián.

== Mayagüez–Aguadilla combined area ==
The Mayagüez–Aguadilla combined statistical area (CSA) is divided into two metropolitan statistical areas (MSA), the Mayagüez MSA and Aguadilla MSA, covering 13 of 78 municipalities in Puerto Rico.

In 2009, the Mayagüez–Aguadilla combined statistical area comprised 6.5% of total population in Puerto Rico. The 2010 census placed the population at 519,331, a 51.61% increase over the 2000 census figure of 251,260. The 2020 census placed the population at 467,599, a 9.96% decrease over the 2010 census figure of 519,331.

With an estimated population of 458,312 as of 2023, the Mayagüez–Aguadilla combined statistical area is the 2nd most populous CSA in Puerto Rico and the 93rd most populous CSA in the United States between the Kalamazoo–Battle Creek–Portage, MI CSA and the Cedar Rapids–Iowa City, IA CSA.

=== Municipalities ===
- Mayagüez–Aguadilla combined statistical area (CSA)
  - Aguadilla metropolitan statistical area (MSA) (7 municipalities)
    - Aguadilla Pop: 53,622
    - Isabela Pop: 42,794
    - San Sebastián Pop: 38,926
    - Aguada Pop: 37,528
    - Moca Pop: 37,325
    - Añasco Pop: 24,815
    - Rincón Pop: 15,425
  - Mayagüez metropolitan statistical area (MSA) (6 municipalities)
    - Mayagüez Pop: 69,798
    - Cabo Rojo Pop: 46,665
    - San Germán Pop: 30,996
    - Lajas Pop: 22,872
    - Sabana Grande Pop: 22,210
    - Hormigueros Pop: 15,336

== See also ==
- Puerto Rico census statistical areas
