= Yauco metropolitan area =

United States Census Bureau defined Metropolitan Statistical Area (MSA) in Puerto Rico

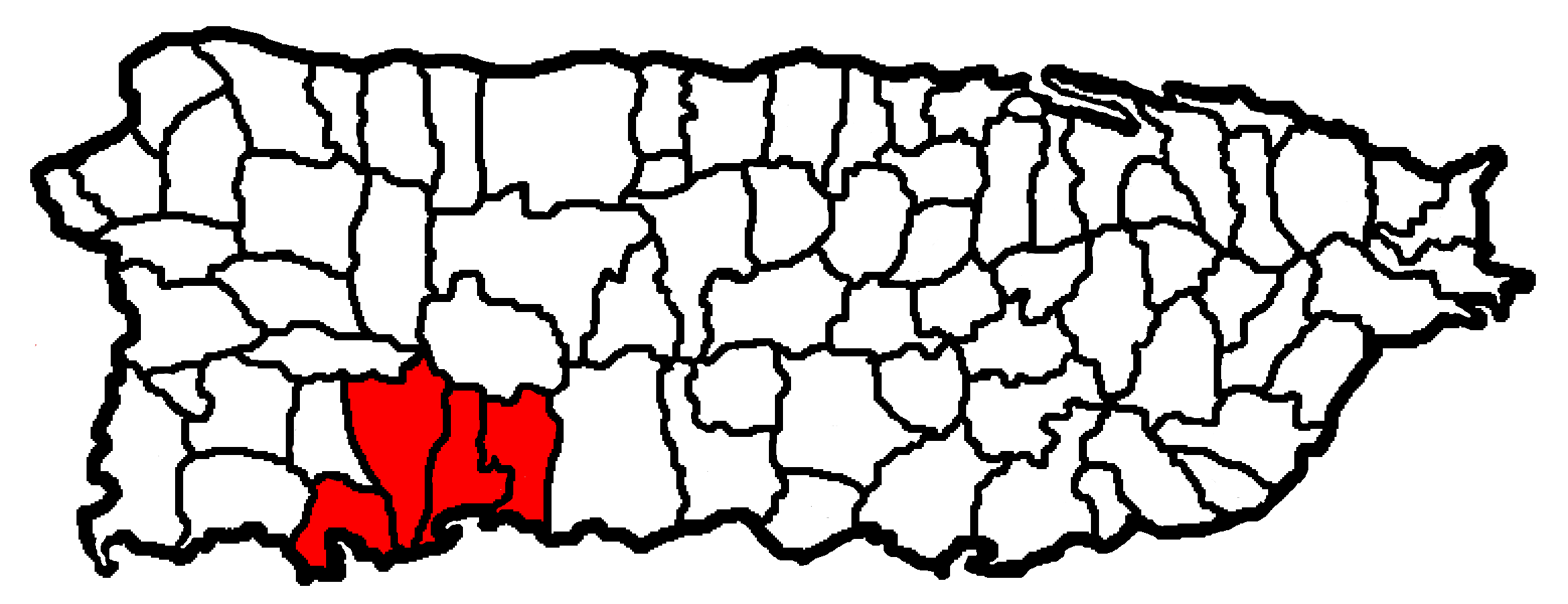
Map of Yauco MSA

The Yauco Metropolitan Statistical Area was a United States Census Bureau defined metropolitan statistical area (MSA) in southwestern Puerto Rico. In 2023, this area was formally dissolved and three of its municipalities were added to the Ponce Metropolitan Statistical Area.

== Municipalities ==
A total of four municipalities (Spanish: municipios) were included as part of the Yauco Metropolitan Statistical Area.

- Yauco (Principal city) Pop: 34,172
- Peñuelas Pop: 20,399
- Guayanilla Pop: 17,784
- Guánica Pop: 13,787

== Combined Statistical Area ==
The Yauco Metropolitan Statistical Area was a component of the Ponce–Yauco–Coamo Combined Statistical Area.

== See also ==
- Puerto Rico census statistical areas
