= Mayagüez metropolitan area =

US Census Bureau defined Metropolitan Statistical Area (MSA) in west central Puerto Rico

Mayagüez metropolitan area Área metropolitana de Mayagüez
- Metropolitan Area
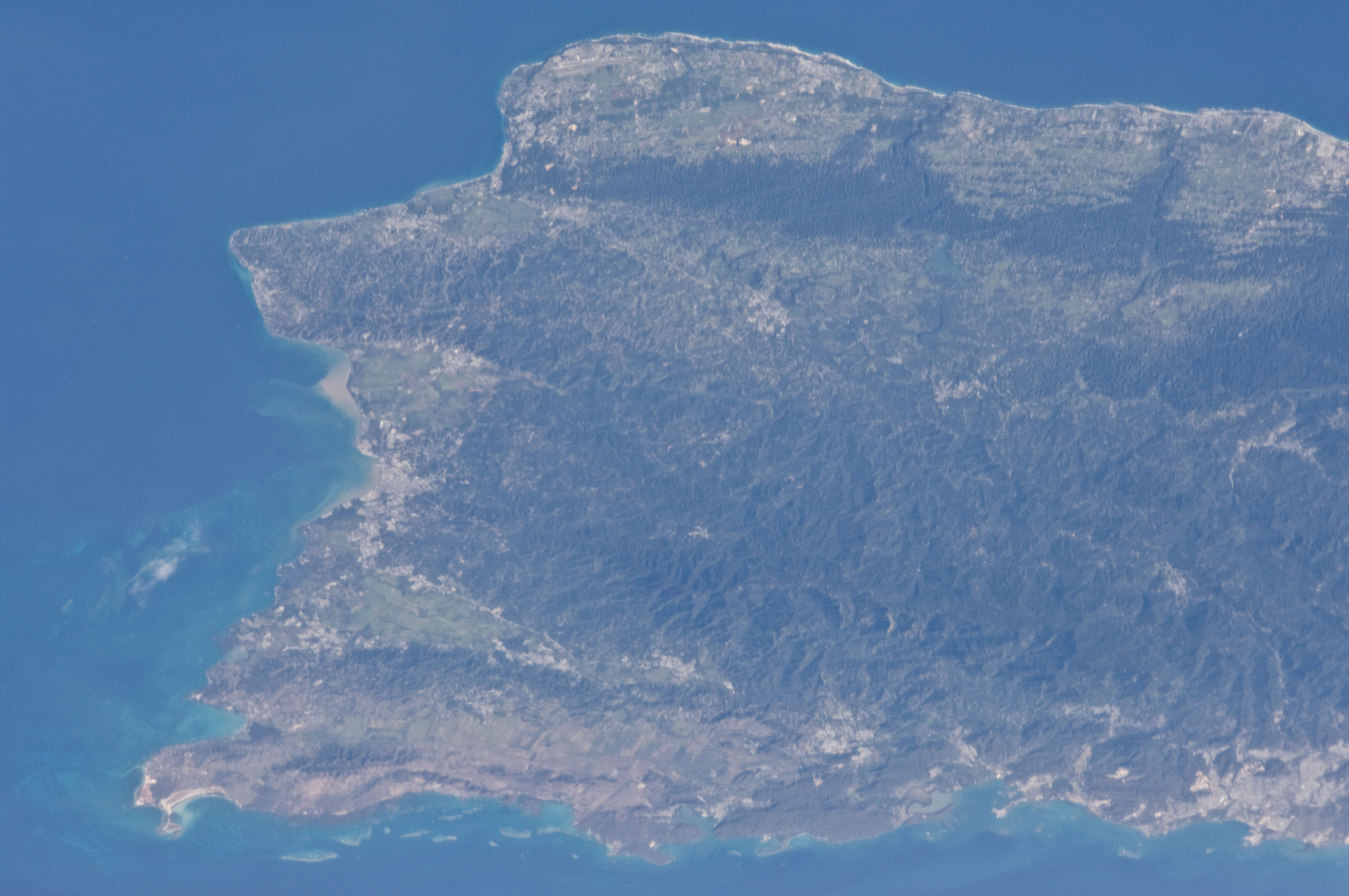
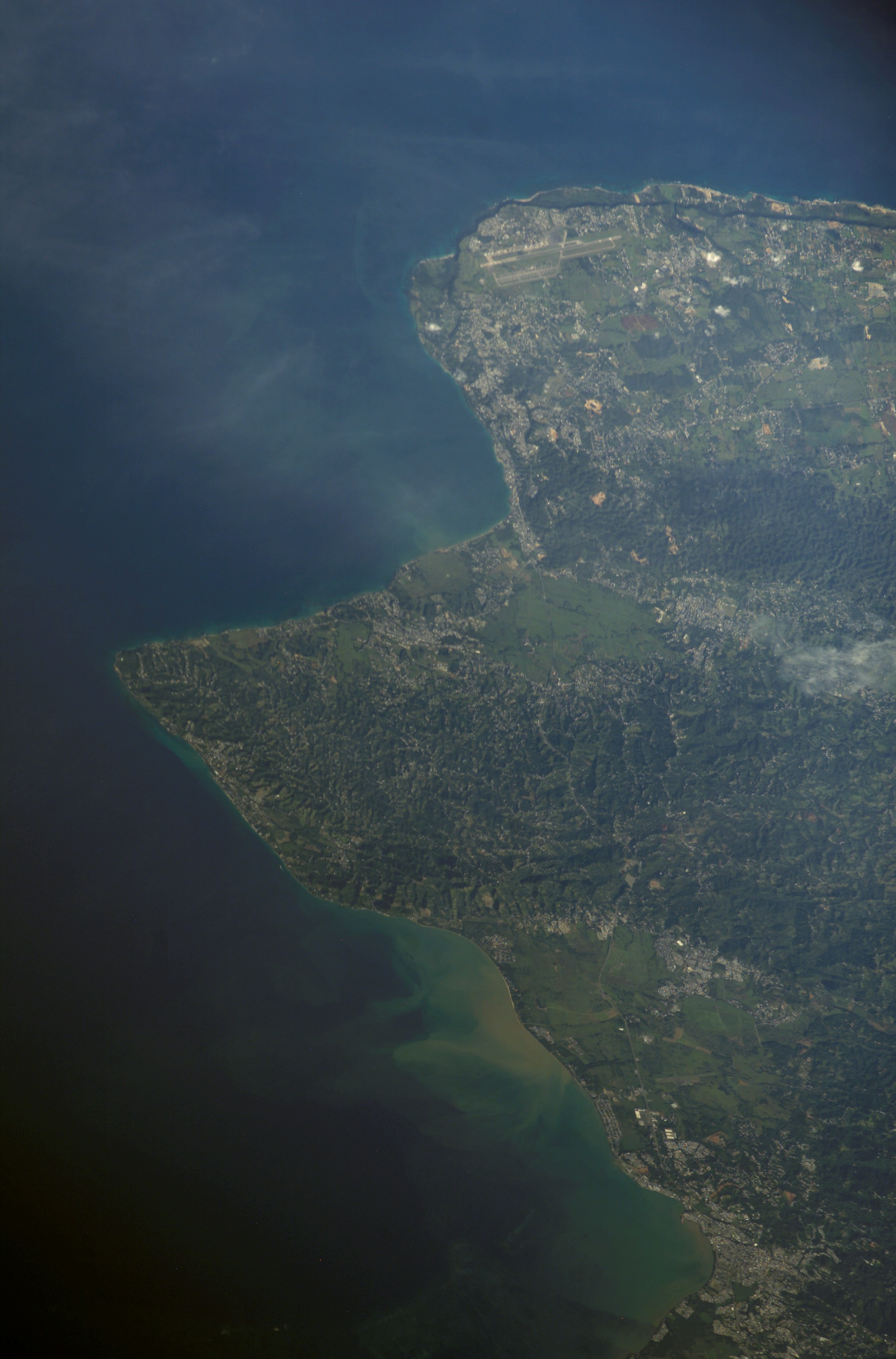
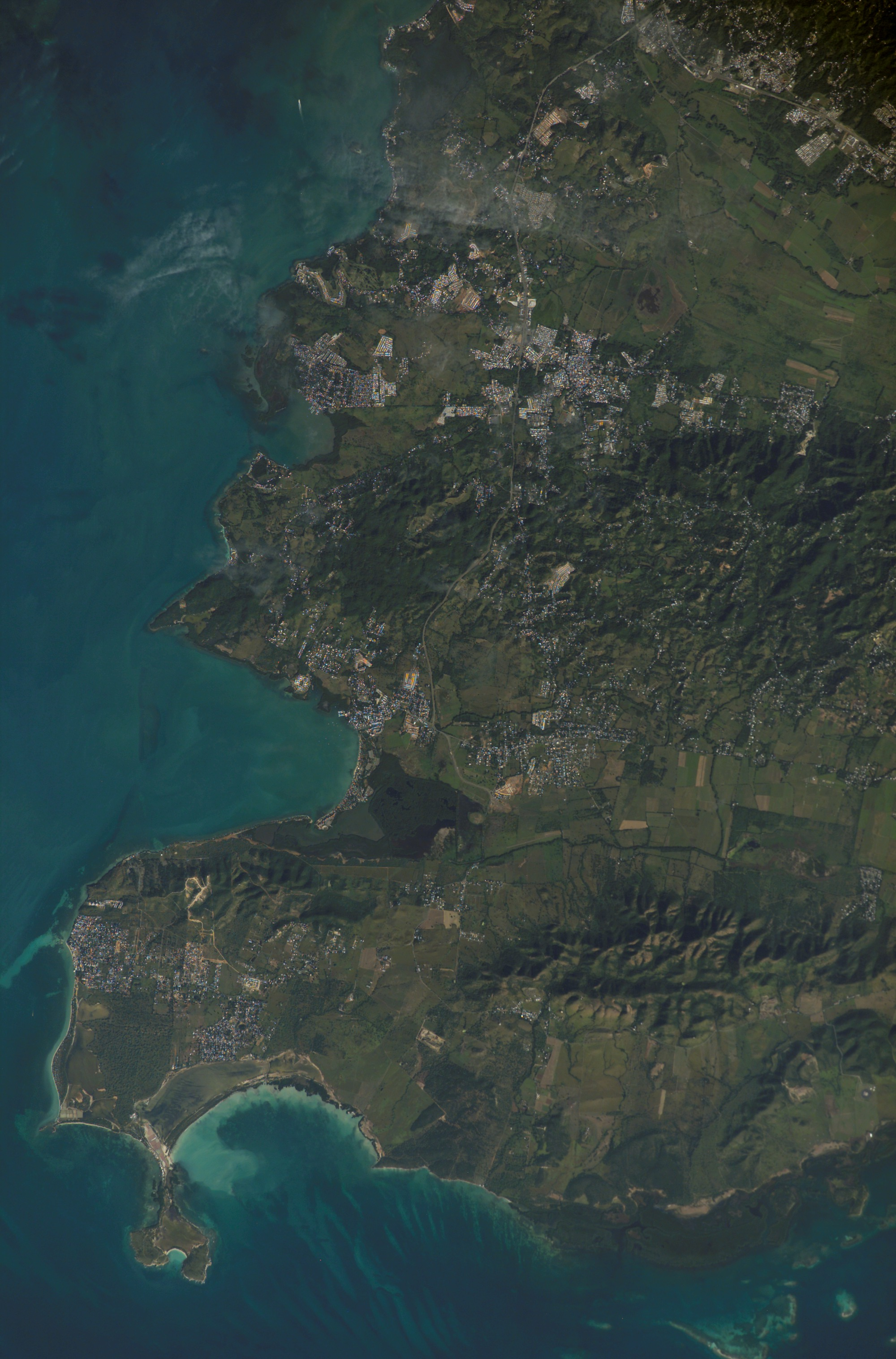
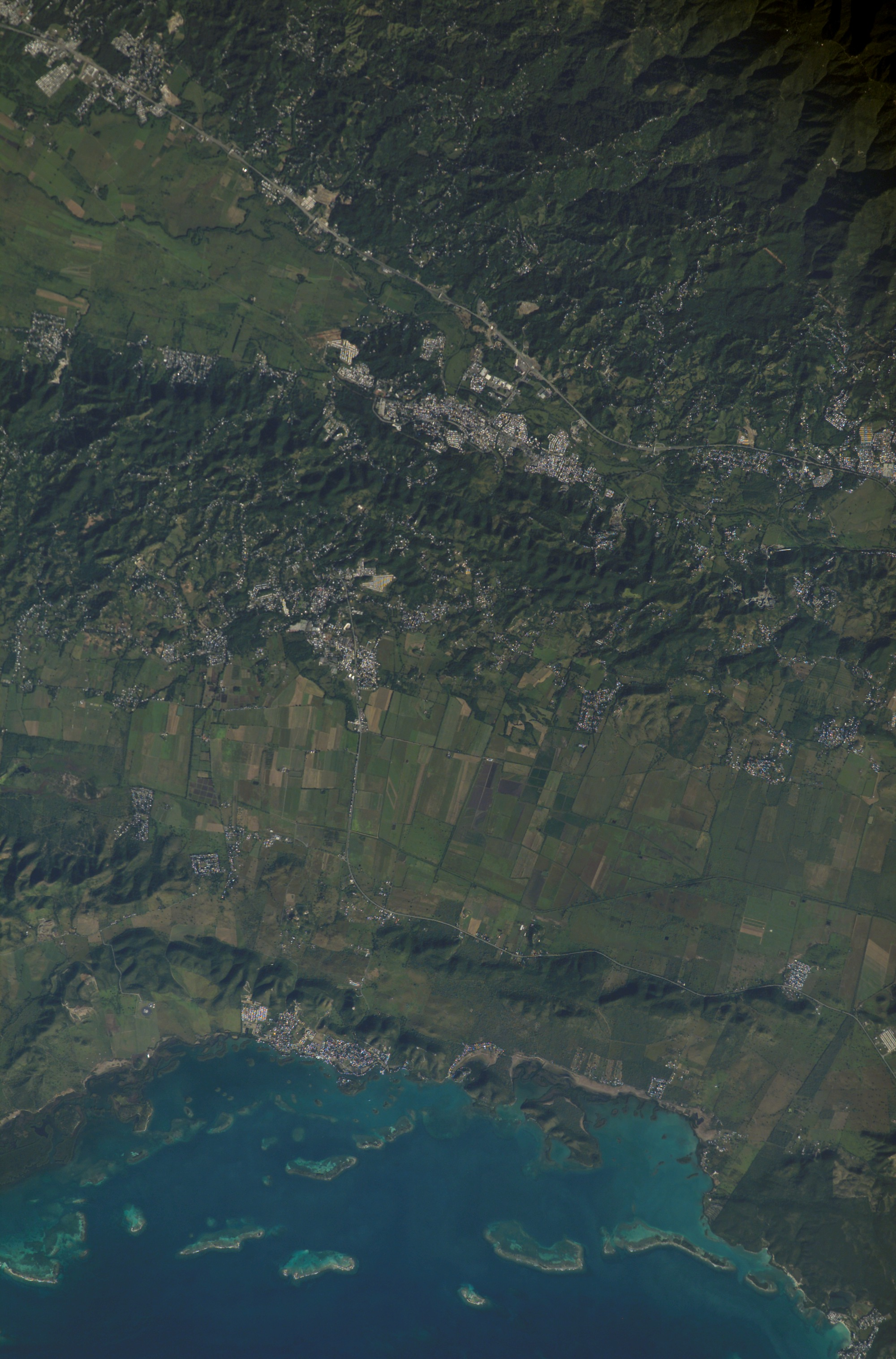
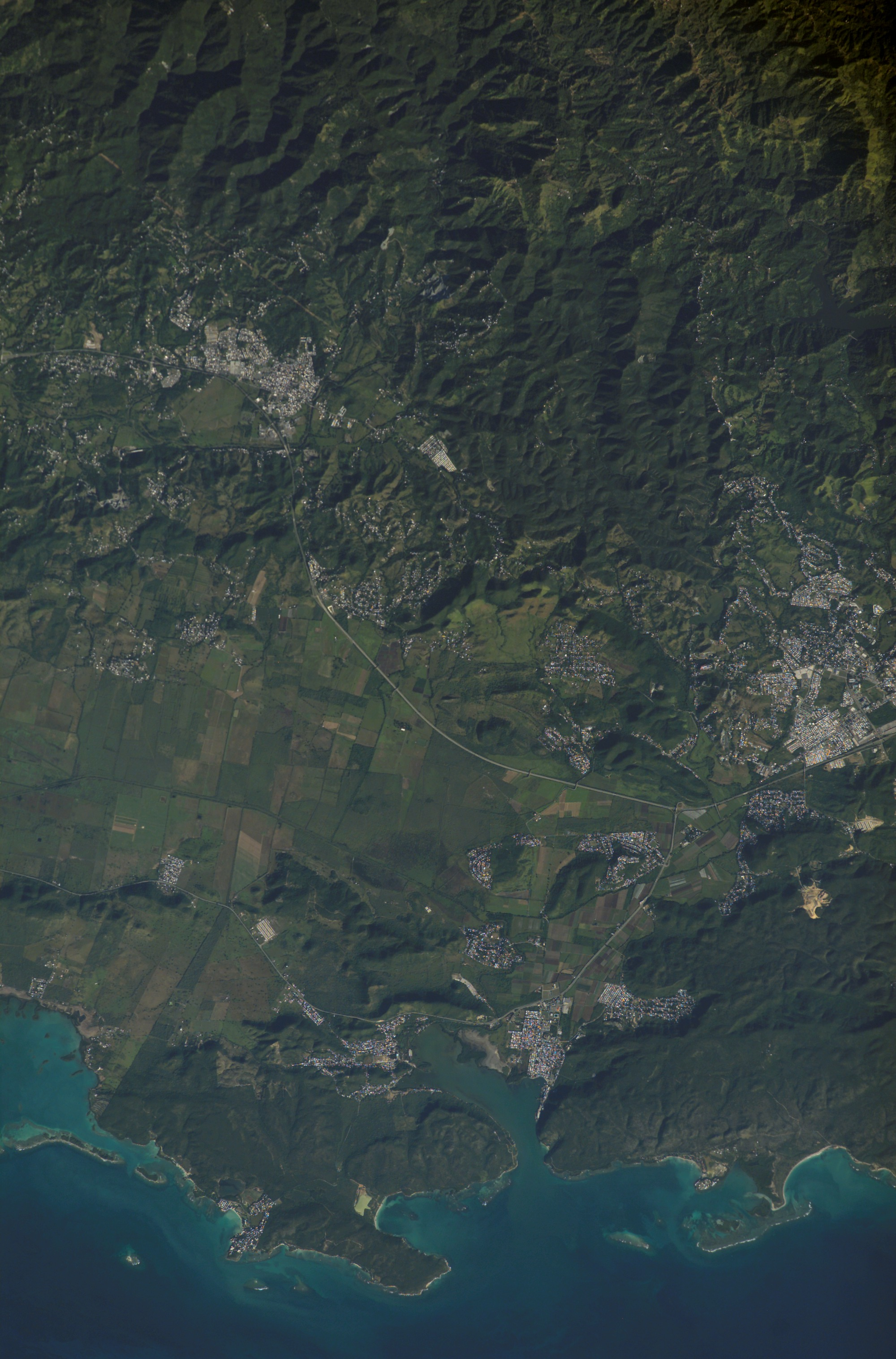
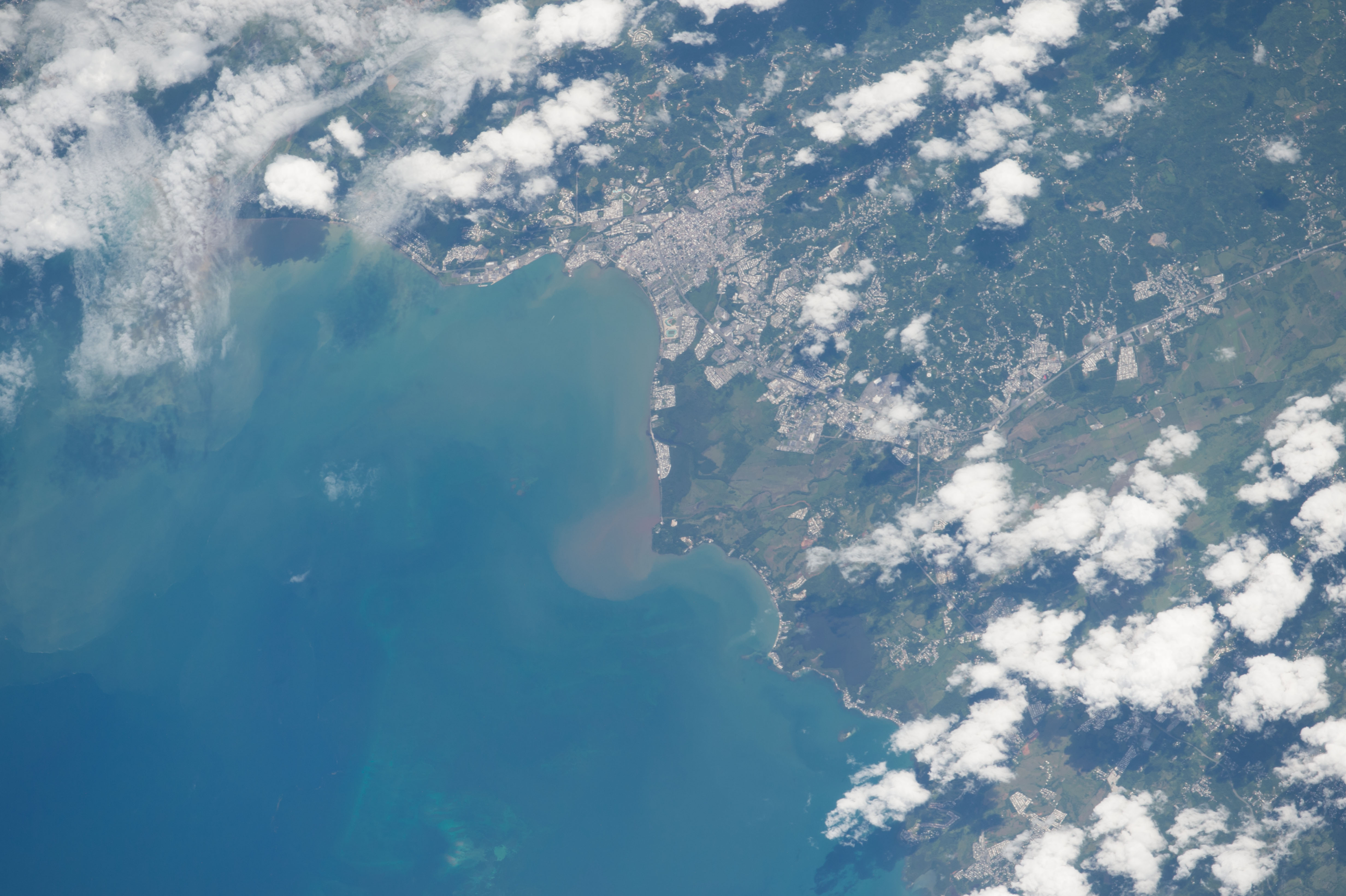
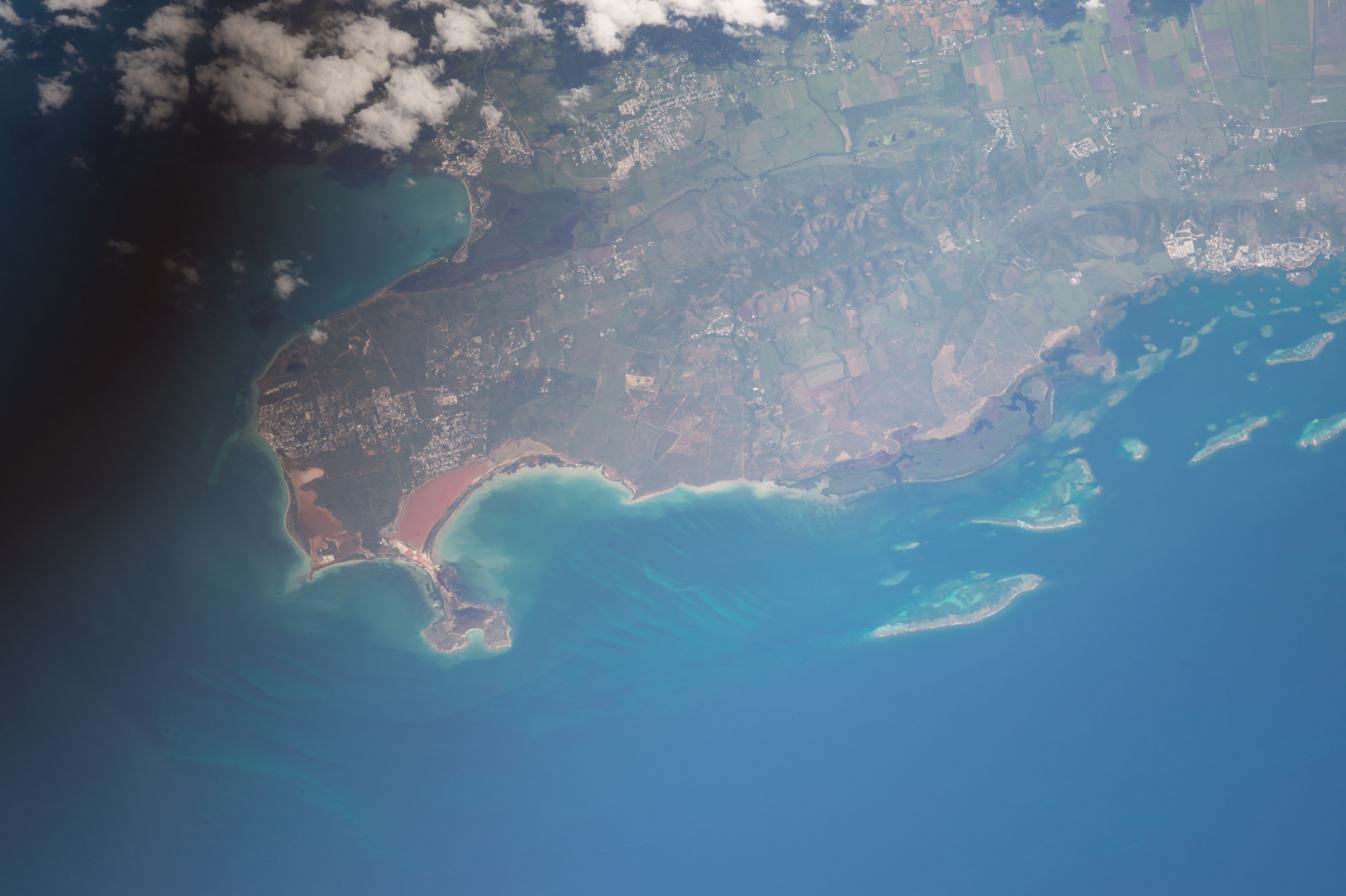
- Mayagüez metropolitan area in southwestern Puerto Rico Aguadilla to Mayagüez Hormigueros and Cabo Rojo San Germán and Lajas Sabana Grande and Guánica Mayagüez and Hormigueros Cabo Rojo Refuge and La Parguera Reserve

- Map of Puerto Rico with urban areas demarcated in orange to yellow
Statistical areas in Puerto Rico
Mayagüez MSA within Mayagüez–Aguadilla CSA
Aguadilla MSA within Mayagüez–Aguadilla CSA
Other Statistical Areas in Puerto Rico: San Juan–Bayamón–Caguas MSA, Arecibo MSA, Guayama MSA, Lares μSA, Utuado μSA, Coco μSA within the San Juan–Bayamón CSA, and Ponce MSA and Coamo μSA within the Ponce–Coamo CSA
Municipalities outside statistical areas
- Country: United States
- Territory: Puerto Rico
- Principal cities: Mayagüez; Aguadilla

Population (2023)
  - Total: 207,877
- Time zone: UTC−4
  - Summer (DST): AST

The Mayagüez metropolitan area (Spanish: área metropolitana de Mayagüez), is the fourth largest metropolitan statistical area (MSA) in Puerto Rico, comprising the municipalities of Mayagüez, Cabo Rojo, San Germán, Lajas, Sabana Grande, and Hormigueros between the coastal plains and the Cordillera Central mountain subrange in the southwestern region of the main island. One of 6 metropolitan statistical areas in Puerto Rico, it lies within the Mayagüez–Aguadilla combined statistical area (CSA), which is one of 3 primary statistical areas in the main island as defined by the United States Census Bureau. As of 2023, census estimates place the population of the Mayagüez metropolitan area at 207,877.

== Mayagüez metropolitan area ==
With an estimated population of 207,877 as of 2023, the Mayagüez metropolitan area (MSA) is the fourth populous in Puerto Rico, covering 6 of 78 municipalities in the southwestern region of the main island. Mayagüez is considered to be its principal city. The Mayagüez metropolitan area is the 223rd most populated in the United States between the Lexington Park, MD MSA and the Chico, CA MSA.

=== Municipalities ===
- Mayagüez metropolitan statistical area (MSA) (6 municipalities)
  - Mayagüez Pop: 69,798
  - Cabo Rojo Pop: 46,665
  - San Germán Pop: 30,996
  - Lajas Pop: 22,872
  - Sabana Grande Pop: 22,210
  - Hormigueros Pop: 15,336

The San Germán–Cabo Rojo metropolitan Metropolitan Statistical Area was formerly a separate area in Puerto Rico, but this area was dissolved, and its municipalities were added to the Mayagüez metropolitan area in 2023.

=== Topography ===

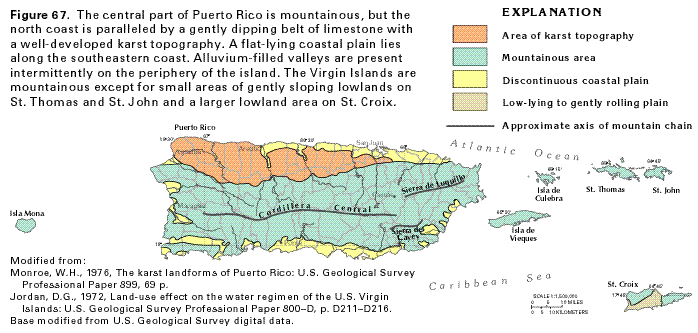
General physiographic map of Puerto Rico, with mountainous terrain in green, karst in orange, and plains in yellow

Comprising Mayagüez, Cabo Rojo, San Germán, Lajas, Sabana Grande, and Hormigueros, the Mayagüez metropolitan area is situated between the western and southern coastal plains, the Añasco Valley, the Lajas Valley, the Guanajibo Valley, and the Cordillera Central mountain subrange in the southwestern region of the main island of Puerto Rico.

All municipalities have an urbanized, densely populated downtown area and administrative center, categorized as a barrio and known as a pueblo, and concentrated urbanized residential areas with large populations, especially along the coastlines of Mayagüez, Cabo Rojo, and Lajas. All municipales have rural areas, particularly those that lie on mountainous terrain like San Germán, Sabana Grande, and Hormigueros.

== Mayagüez–Aguadilla combined area ==
The Mayagüez–Aguadilla combined statistical area (CSA) is divided into two metropolitan statistical areas (MSA), the Mayagüez MSA and Aguadilla MSA, covering 13 of 78 municipalities in Puerto Rico.

In 2009, the Mayagüez–Aguadilla combined statistical area comprised 6.5% of total population in Puerto Rico. The 2010 census placed the population at 519,331, a 51.61% increase over the 2000 census figure of 251,260. The 2020 census placed the population at 467,599, a 9.96% decrease over the 2010 census figure of 519,331.

With an estimated population of 458,312 as of 2023, the Mayagüez–Aguadilla combined statistical area is the 2nd most populous CSA in Puerto Rico and the 93rd most populous CSA in the United States between the Kalamazoo–Battle Creek–Portage, MI CSA and the Cedar Rapids–Iowa City, IA CSA.

=== Municipalities ===
- Mayagüez–Aguadilla combined statistical area (CSA)
  - Aguadilla metropolitan statistical area (MSA) (7 municipalities)
    - Aguadilla Pop: 53,622
    - Isabela Pop: 42,794
    - San Sebastián Pop: 38,926
    - Aguada Pop: 37,528
    - Moca Pop: 37,325
    - Añasco Pop: 24,815
    - Rincón Pop: 15,425
  - Mayagüez metropolitan statistical area (MSA) (6 municipalities)
    - Mayagüez Pop: 69,798
    - Cabo Rojo Pop: 46,665
    - San Germán Pop: 30,996
    - Lajas Pop: 22,872
    - Sabana Grande Pop: 22,210
    - Hormigueros Pop: 15,336

== See also ==
- Puerto Rico census statistical areas
