= Ponce metropolitan area =

Statistical area in Puerto Rico

Ponce metropolitan area Área metropolitana de Ponce
- Metropolitan area
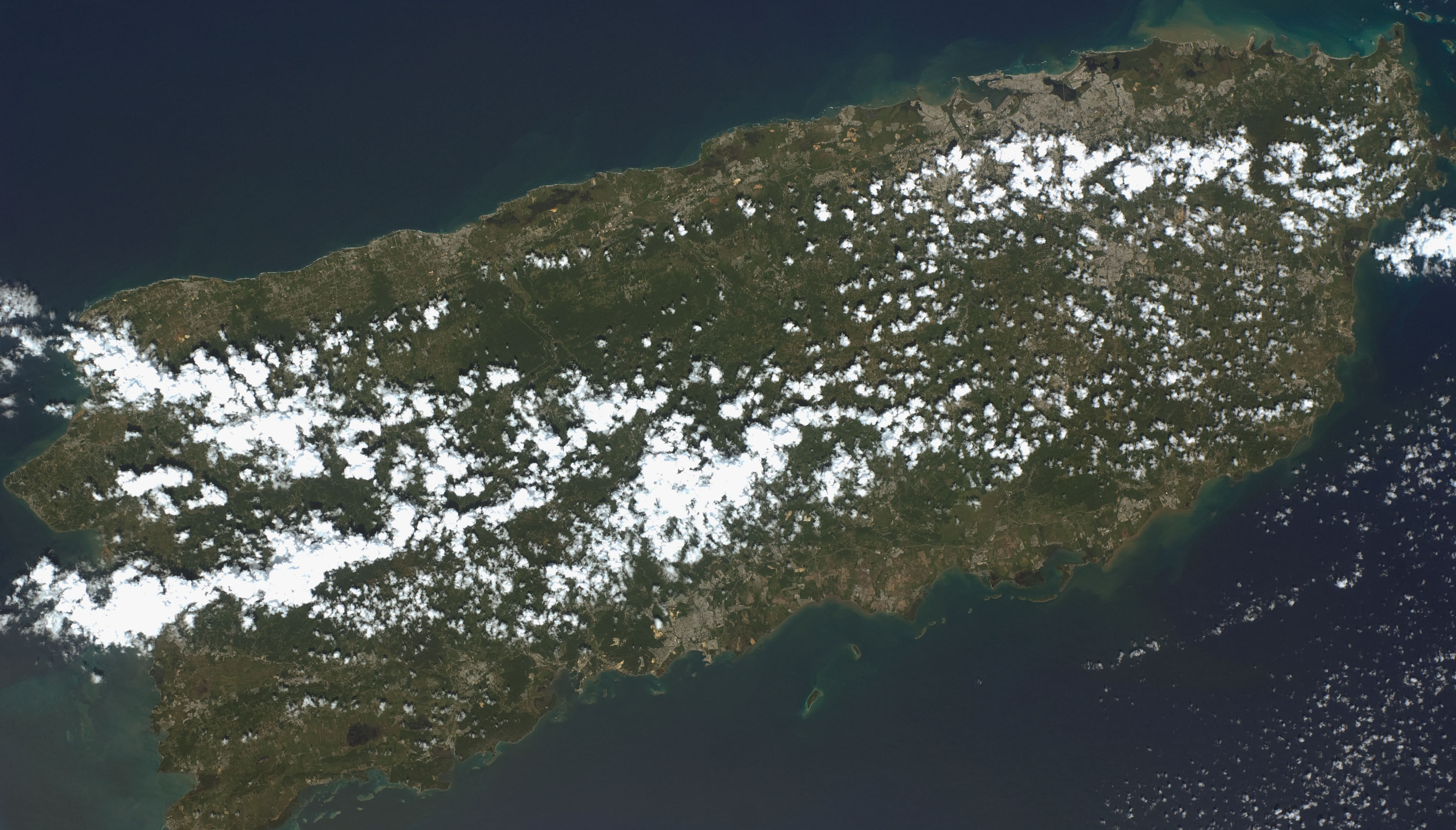
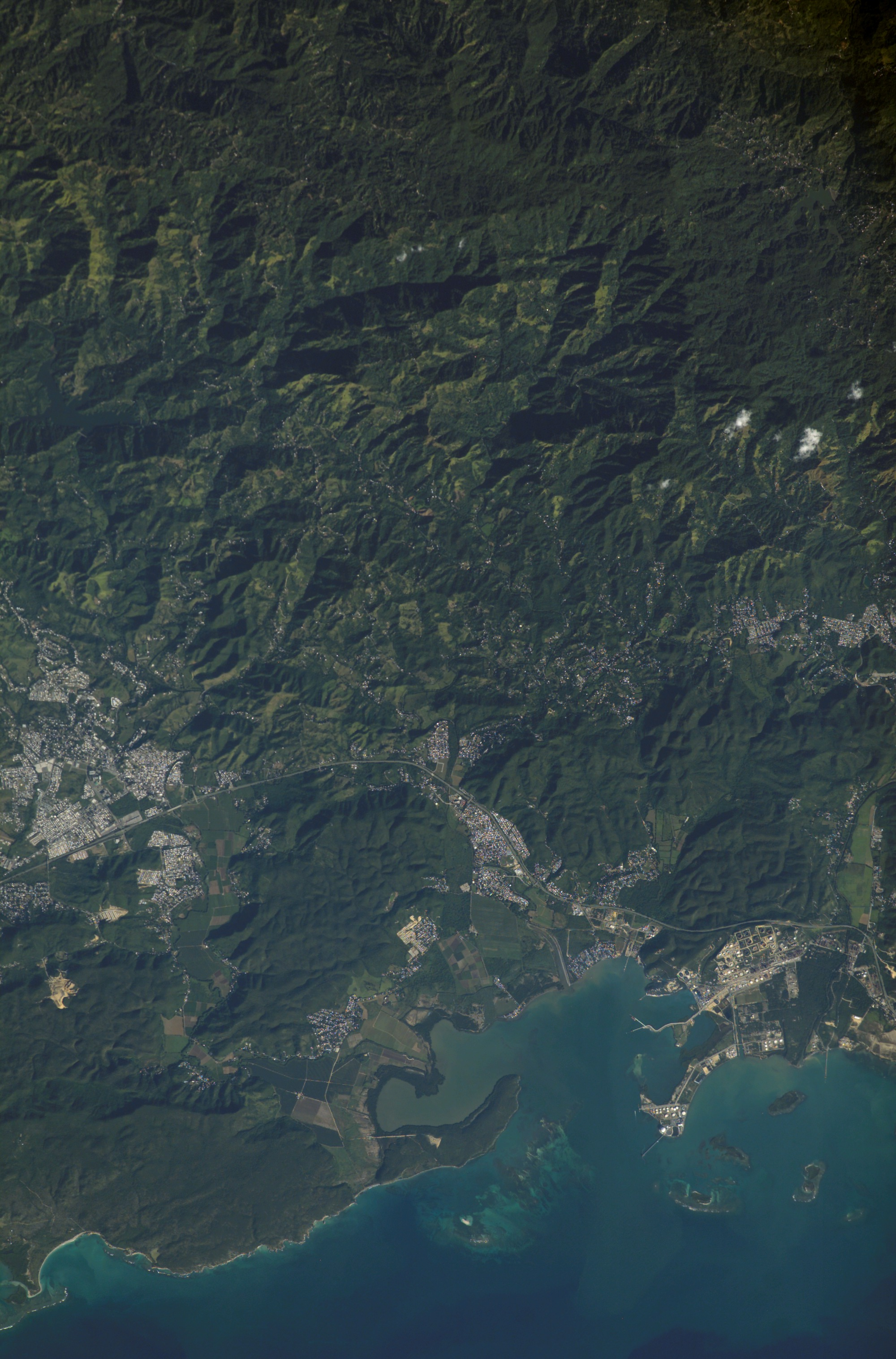
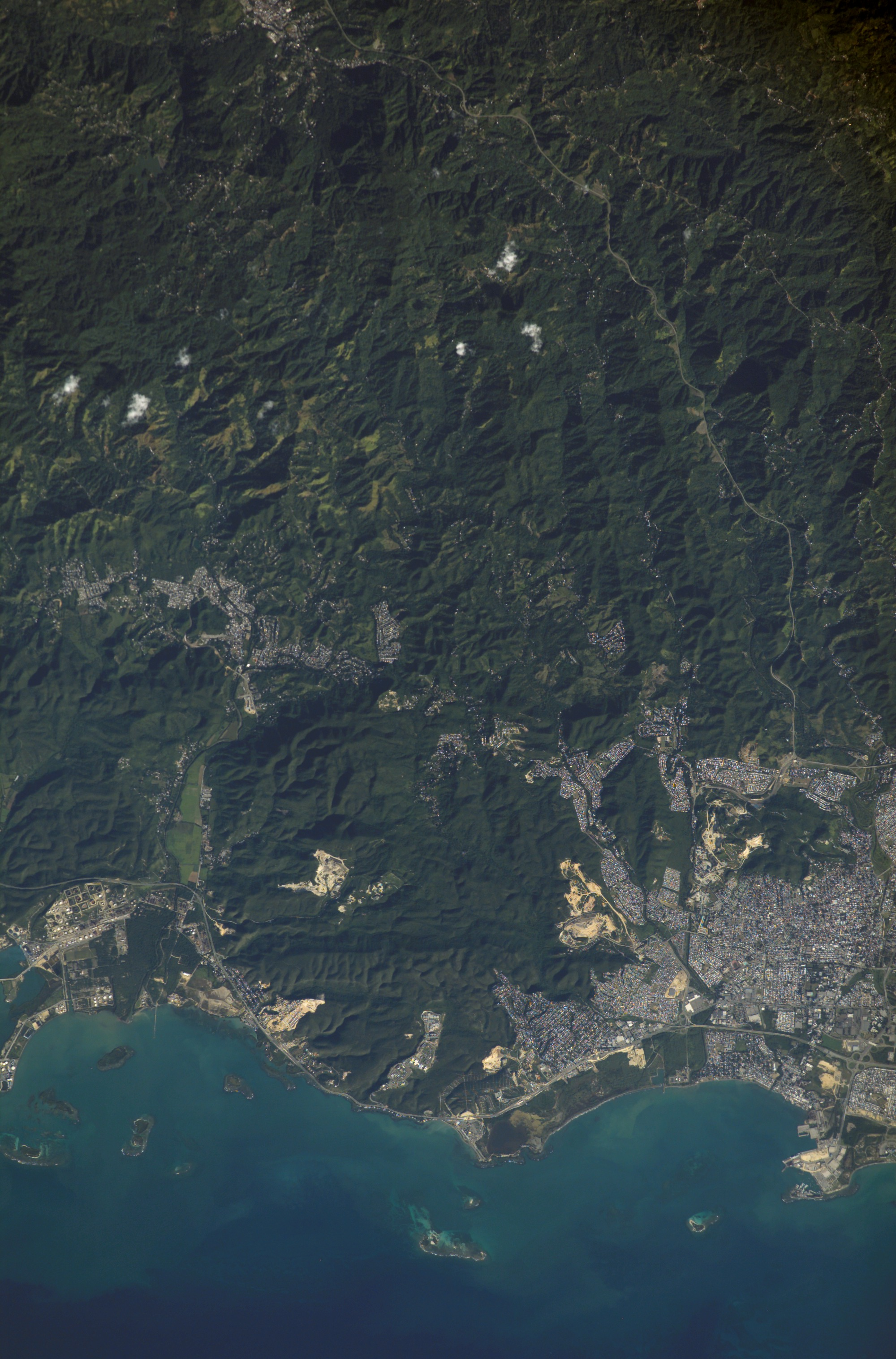
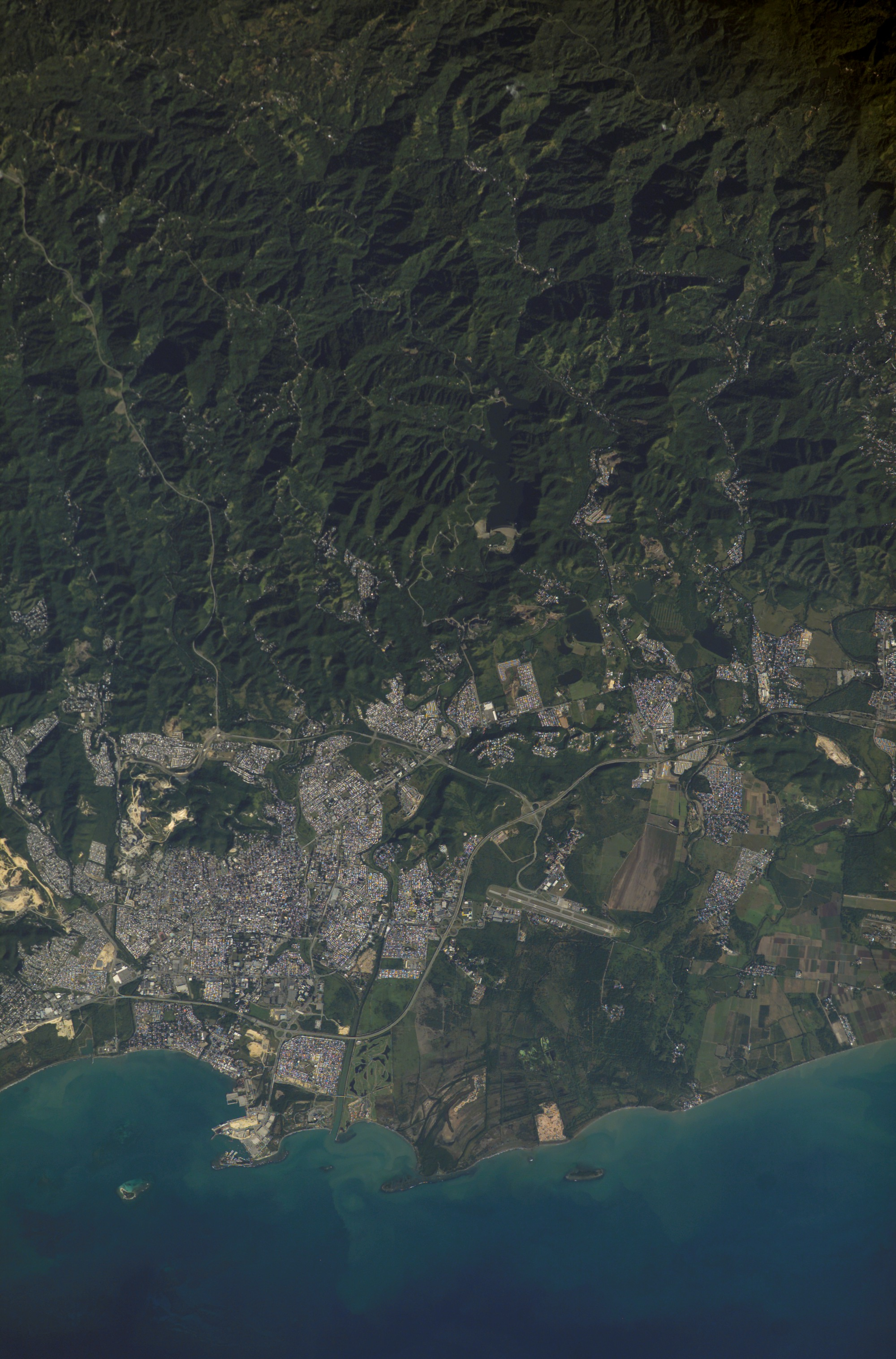
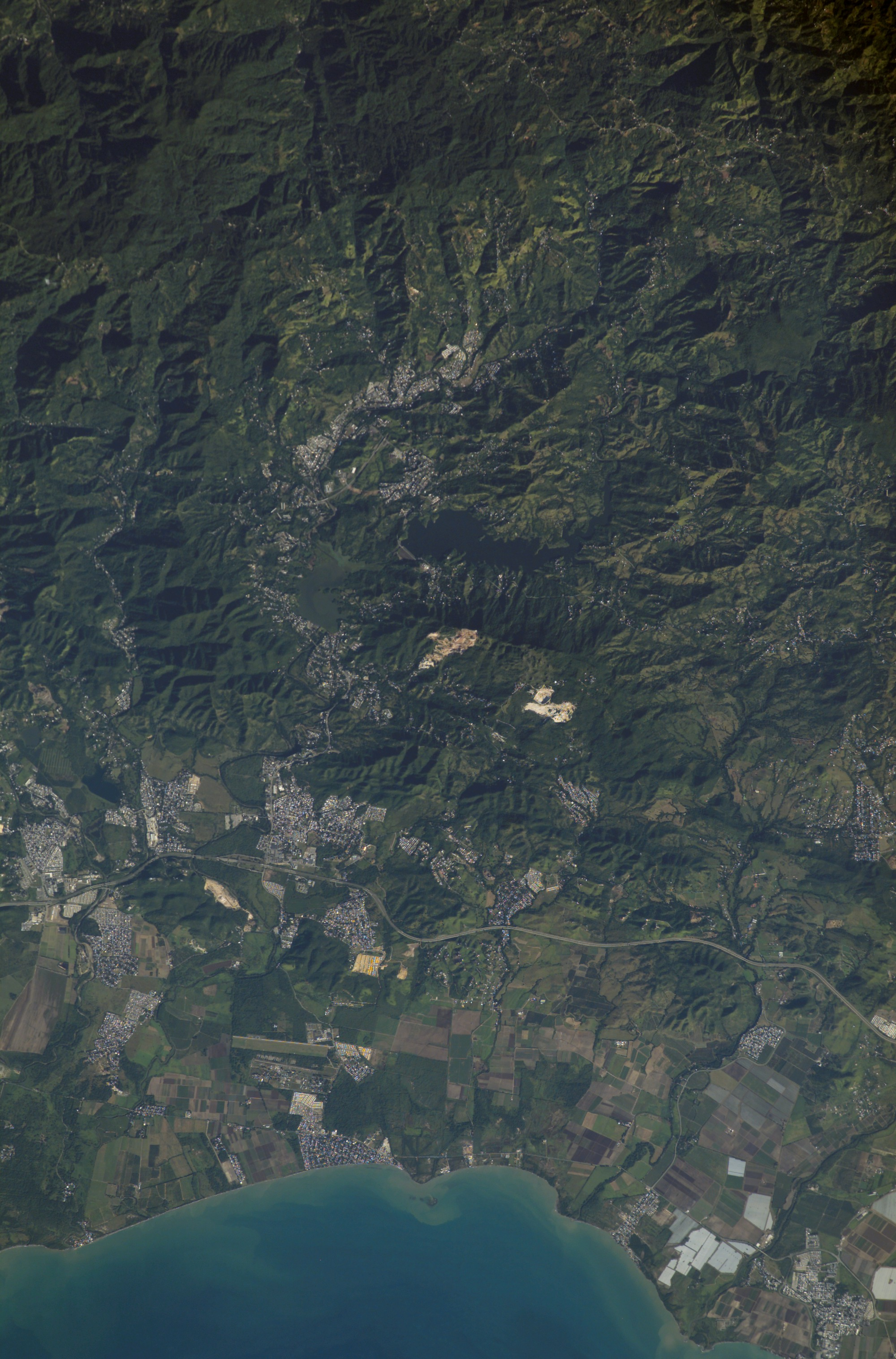
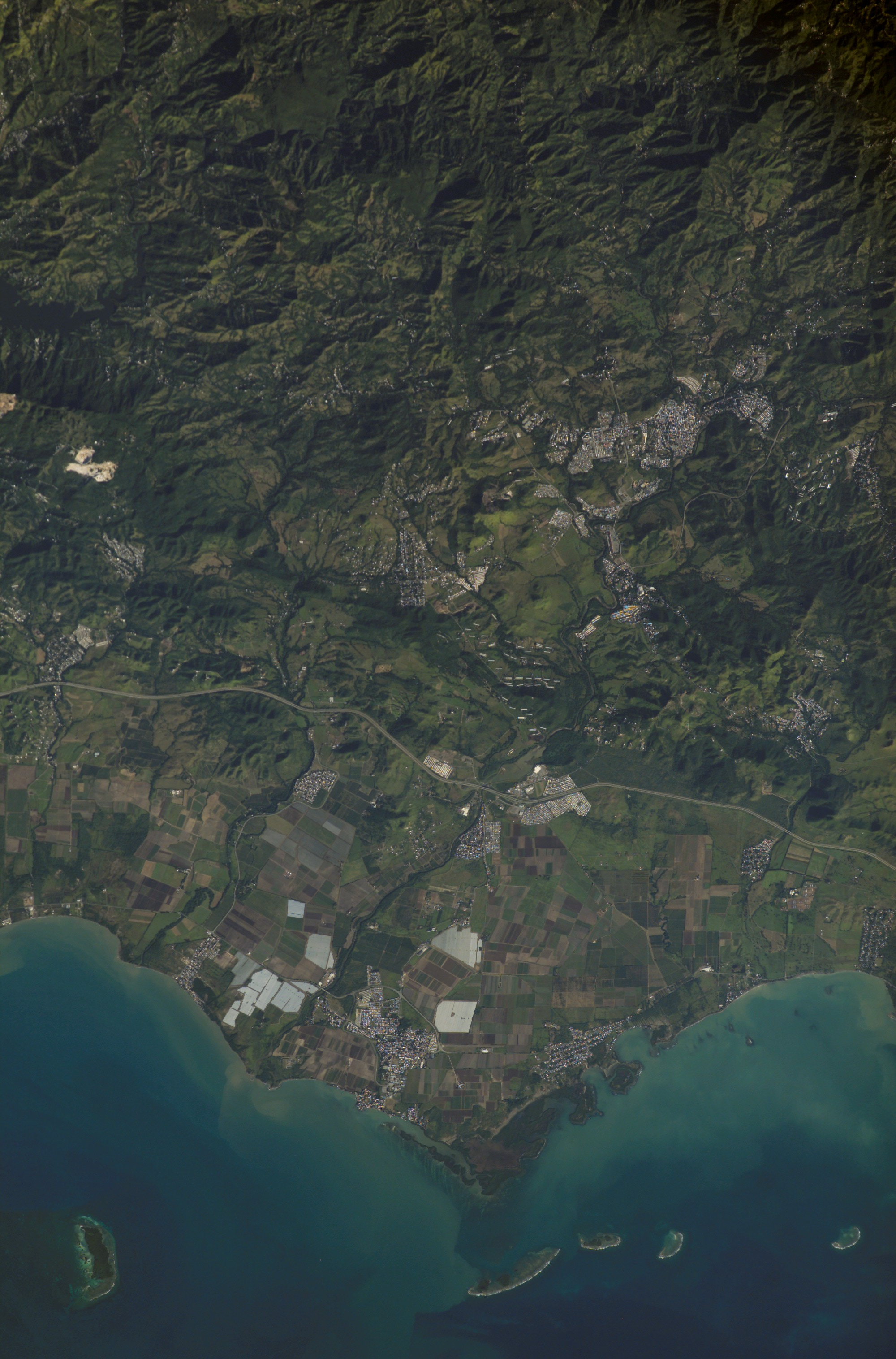
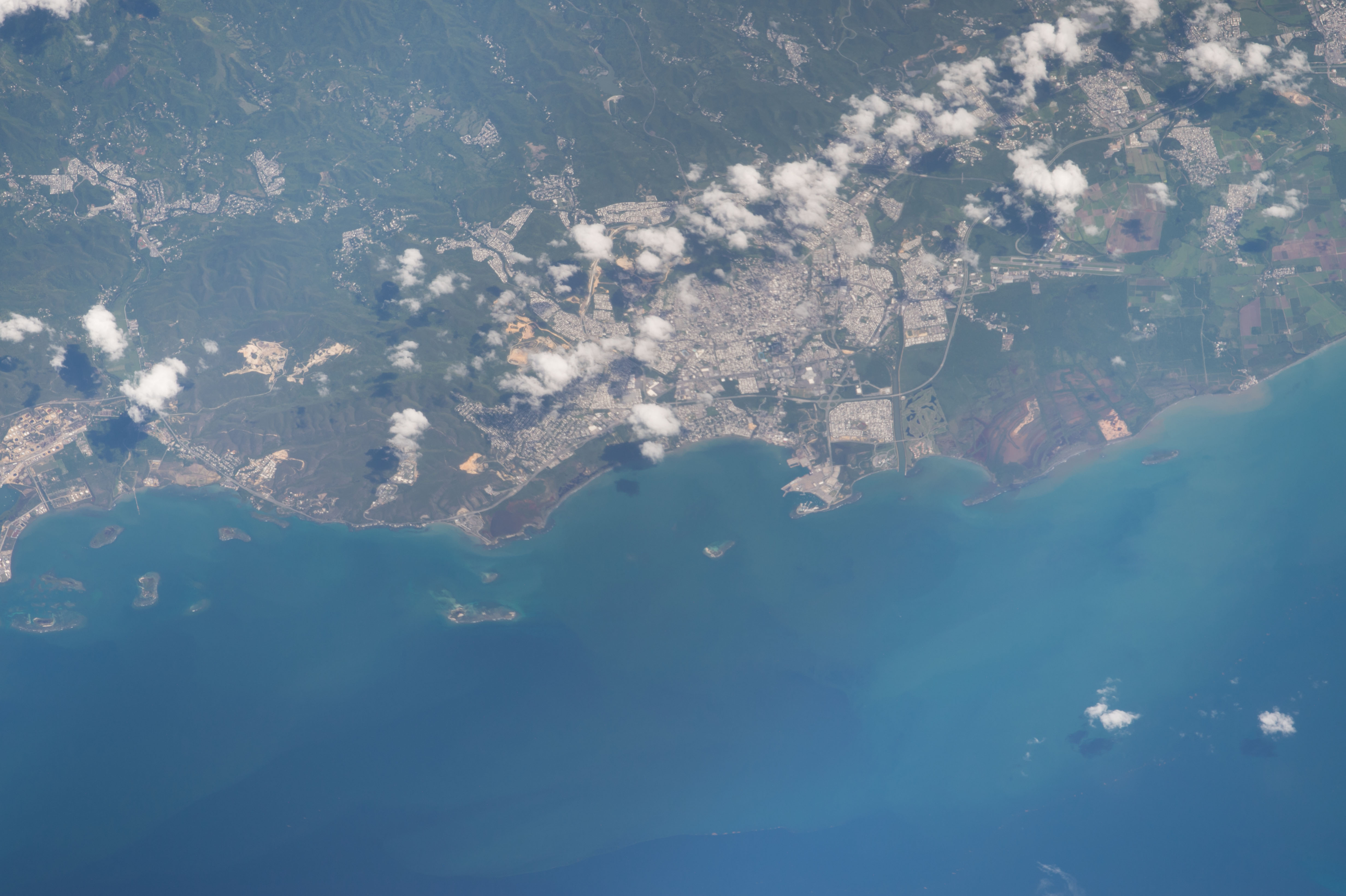
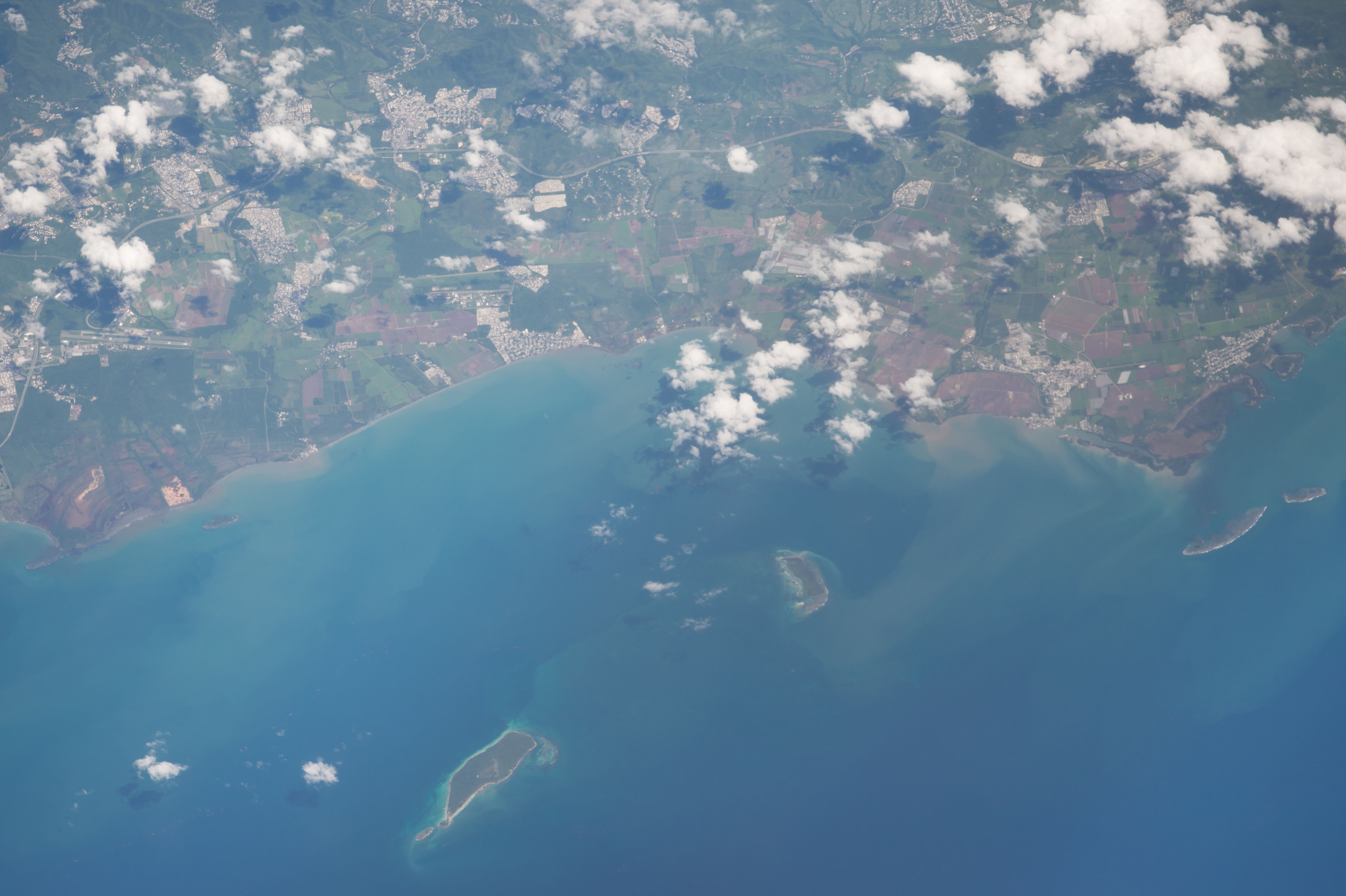
- Ponce metropolitan area in south central Puerto Rico Yauco and Guayanilla Peñuelas and Ponce Ponce and Juana Díaz Villalba and Juana Díaz Coamo and Santa Isabel Cays in Tollaboa Bay to Isla del Frío in Ponce Bay Caja de Muertos to Punta Petrona Natural Reserve

- Map of Puerto Rico with urban areas demarcated in orange to yellow
Statistical areas in Puerto Rico
Ponce MSA within Ponce–Coamo CSA
Coamo μSA within the Ponce–Coamo CSA
Other Statistical Areas in Puerto Rico: San Juan–Bayamón–Caguas MSA, Arecibo MSA, Guayama MSA, Lares μSA, Utuado μSA, and Coco μSA within the San Juan–Bayamón CSA, and Mayagüez MSA and Aguadilla MSA within Mayagüez–Aguadilla CSA
Municipalities outside statistical areas
- Country: United States
- Territory: Puerto Rico
- Principal cities: Ponce; Coamo

Population (2023)
  - MSA: 266,237
- Time zone: UTC−4
  - Summer (DST): AST

The Ponce metropolitan area (Spanish: área metropolitana de Ponce), is the second largest metropolitan statistical area (MSA) in Puerto Rico, comprising the municipalities of Ponce, Juana Díaz, Yauco, Villalba, Peñuelas, Adjuntas, and Guayanilla between the coastal plain and the Cordillera Central mountain subrange in the south central region of the main island. One of 6 metropolitan statistical areas in Puerto Rico, it lies within the Ponce–Coamo combined statistical area (CSA), which is one of 3 primary statistical areas in the main island as defined by the United States Census Bureau. As of 2023, census estimates place the population of the Ponce metropolitan area at 266,237.

== Ponce metropolitan area ==
With a population of 266,237 as of 2023, the Ponce metropolitan area (MSA) is the second most populous in Puerto Rico, covering 7 of 78 municipalities in the southwestern region of the main island. Ponce is considered to be its principal city. The Ponce metropolitan area is the 188th most populated in the United States between the Erie, PA MSA and the Lynchburg, VA MSA.

=== Municipalities ===
- Ponce metropolitan statistical area (MSA) (7 municipalities)
  - Ponce Pop: 130,251
  - Juana Díaz Pop: 45,919
  - Yauco Pop: 32,406
  - Villalba Pop: 21,285
  - Peñuelas Pop: 19,563
  - Adjuntas Pop: 17,900
  - Guayanilla Pop: 16,813

The Yauco Metropolitan Statistical Area was formerly a separate area in Puerto Rico, but this area was dissolved and three of its municipalities were added to the Ponce metropolitan area in 2023.

=== Topography ===

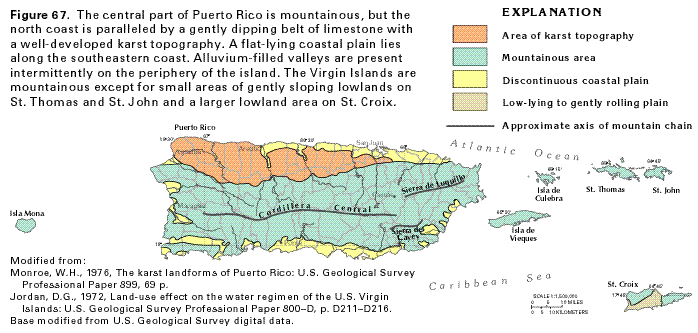
General physiographic map of Puerto Rico, with mountainous terrain in green, karst in orange, and plains in yellow

Comprising Ponce, Juana Díaz, Yauco, Villalba, Peñuelas, Adjuntas, and Guayanilla, the Ponce metropolitan area is situated between the southern coastal plain and the Cordillera Central mountain subrange in the south central region of the main island of Puerto Rico. Comprising Coamo and Santa Isabel, the neighboring Coamo micropolitan area is situated the southern coastal plain, and the Cordillera Central and Sierra de Cayey mountain subranges in the south central region of the main island of Puerto Rico.

All municipalities have an urbanized, densely populated downtown area and administrative center, categorized as a barrio and known as a pueblo, and concentrated urbanized residential areas with large populations, especially along the coastline of Ponce. All municipalities have rural areas, particularly those that lie on mountainous terrain, which is extensive on all jurisdictions, except for the strictly coastal and flat Santa Isabel.

== Ponce–Coamo combined area ==
The Ponce–Coamo combined statistical area (CSA) is divided into one metropolitan statistical areas (MSA), the Ponce MSA, and one micropolitan area (μSA), the Coamo μSA, covering 9 of 78 municipalities in Puerto Rico.

The 2010 census placed the population at 414,322, a 12.47% decrease over the 2000 census figure of 473,357. The 2020 census placed the population at 351,446, a 15.18% decrease over the 2010 census figure of 414,322.

With an estimated population of 337,492 as of 2023, the Ponce–Coamo combined statistical area is the 3rd most populous CSA in Puerto Rico and the 111th most populous CSA in the United States between the Erie–Meadville, PA CSA and the Evansville–Henderson, IN-KY CSA.

=== Municipalities ===
Ponce–Coamo combined statistical area (CSA)

- Ponce metropolitan statistical area (MSA) (7 municipalities)
  - Ponce Pop: 130,251
  - Juana Díaz Pop: 45,919
  - Yauco Pop: 32,406
  - Villalba Pop: 21,285
  - Peñuelas Pop: 19,563
  - Adjuntas Pop: 17,900
  - Guayanilla Pop: 16,813
- Coamo micropolitan statistical area (μSA) (2 municipalities)
  - Coamo Pop: 33,662
  - Santa Isabel Pop: 19,693

== See also ==
- Puerto Rico census statistical areas
