= Guayama metropolitan area =

Metropolitan area in Puerto Rico

Guayama metropolitan area Área metropolitana de Guayama
- Metropolitan area
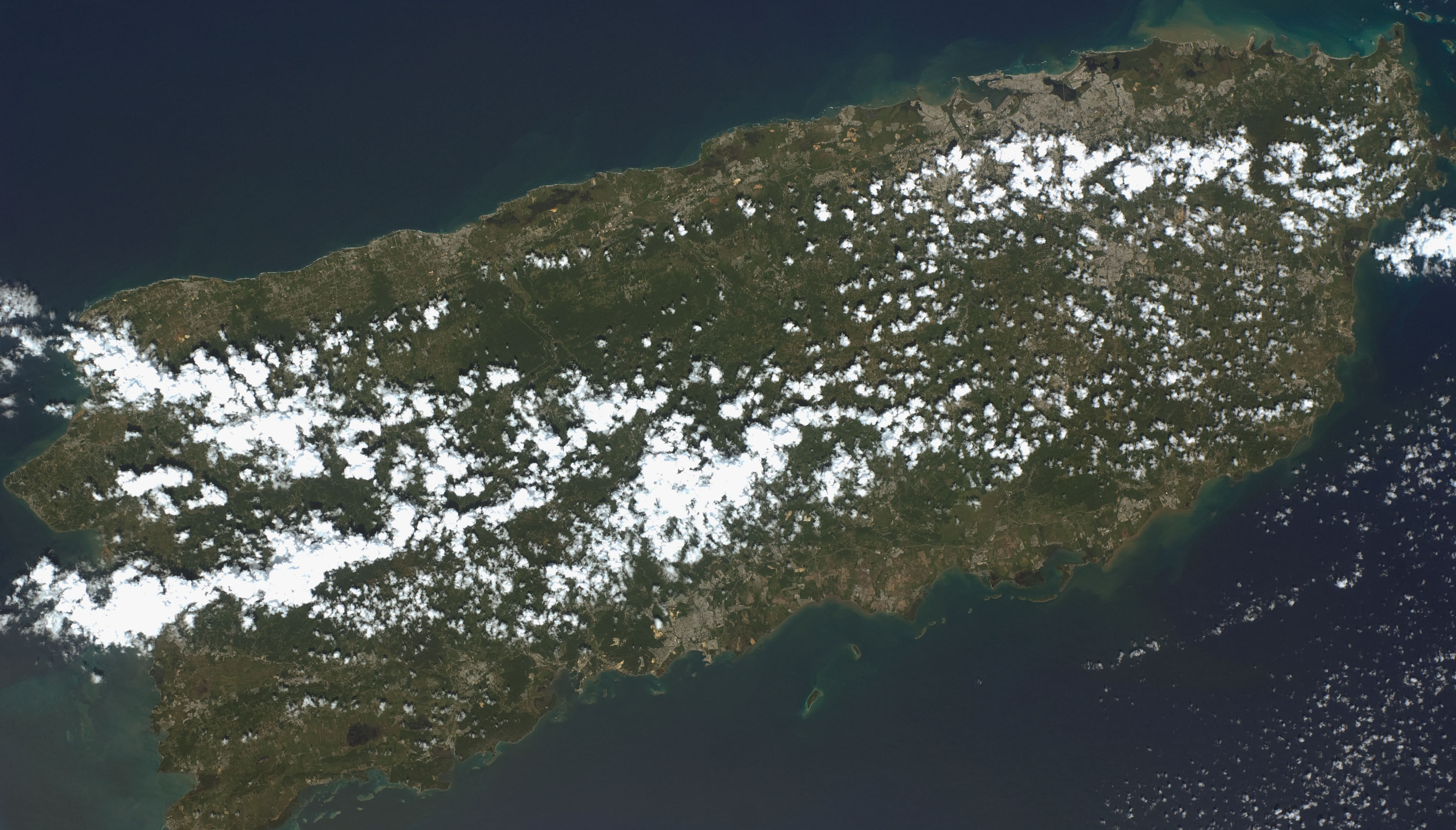
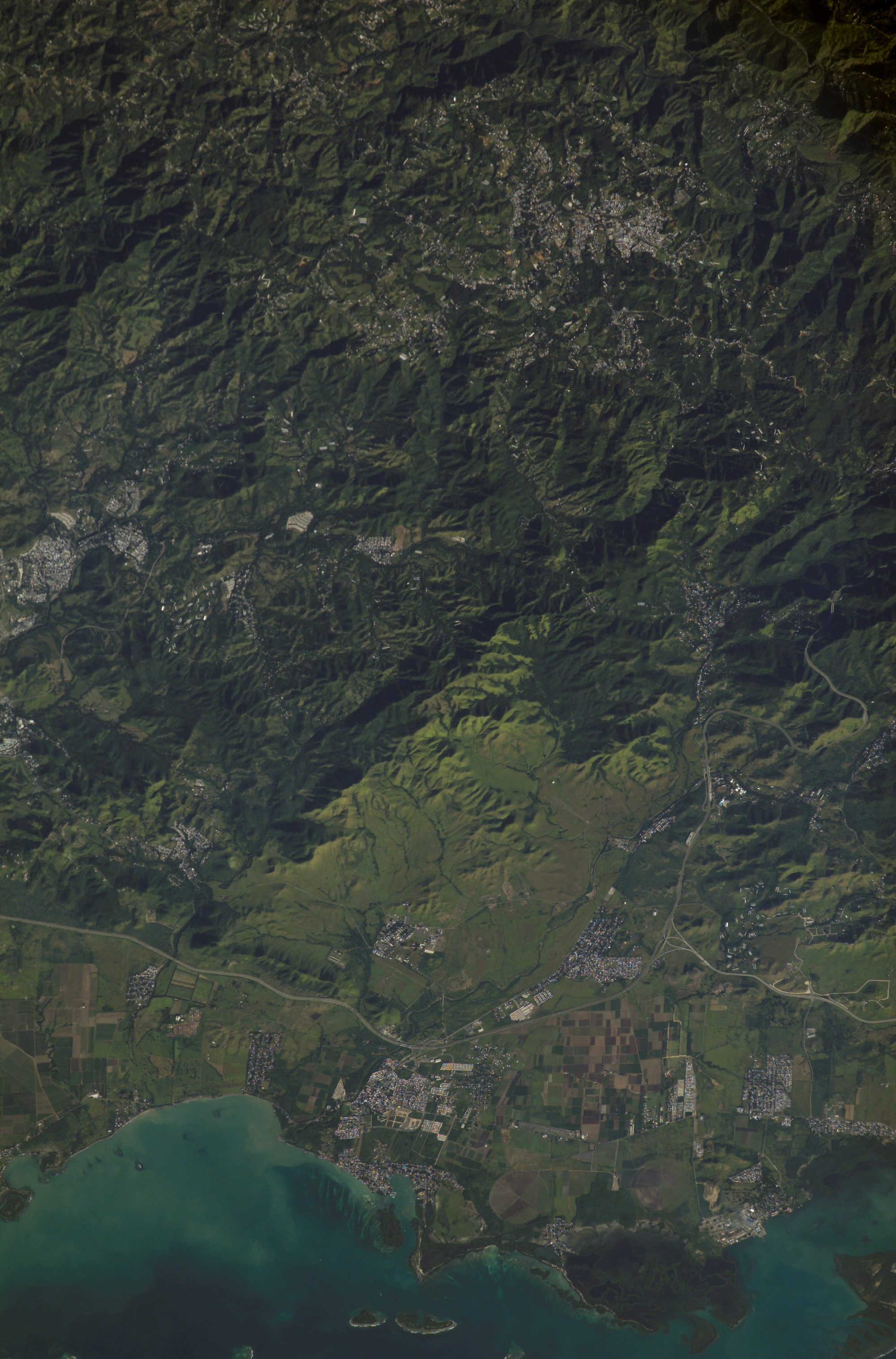
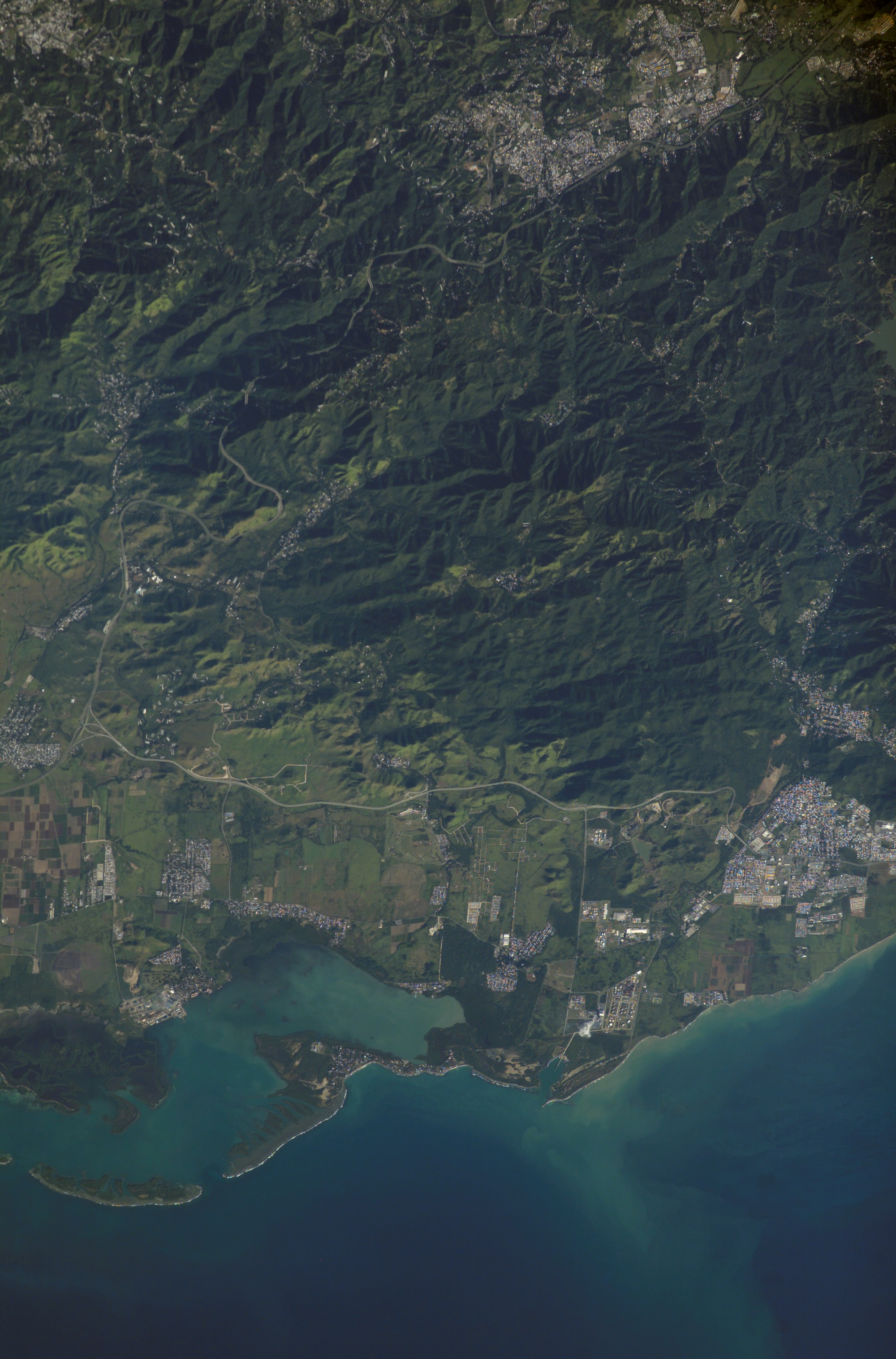
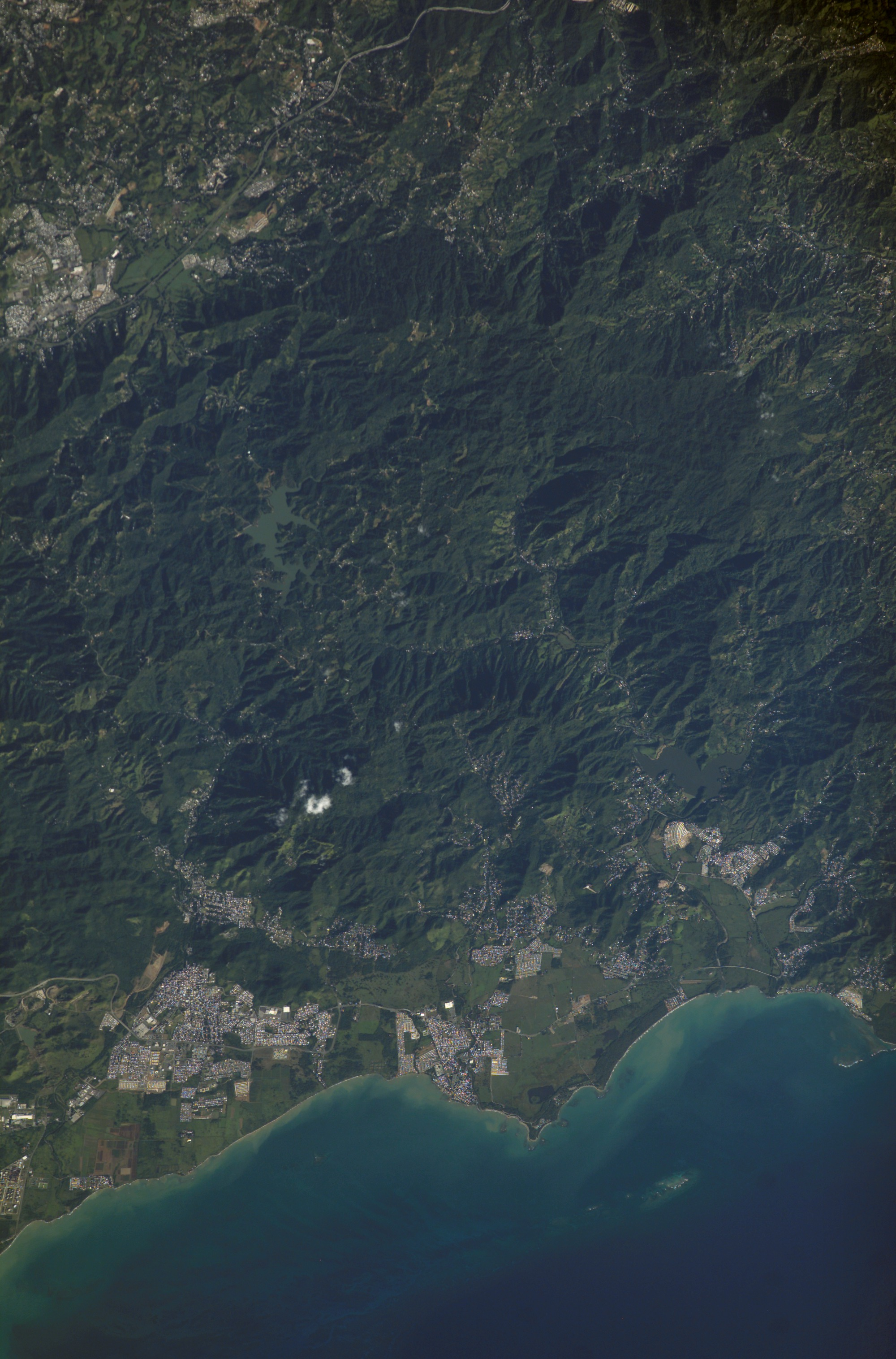
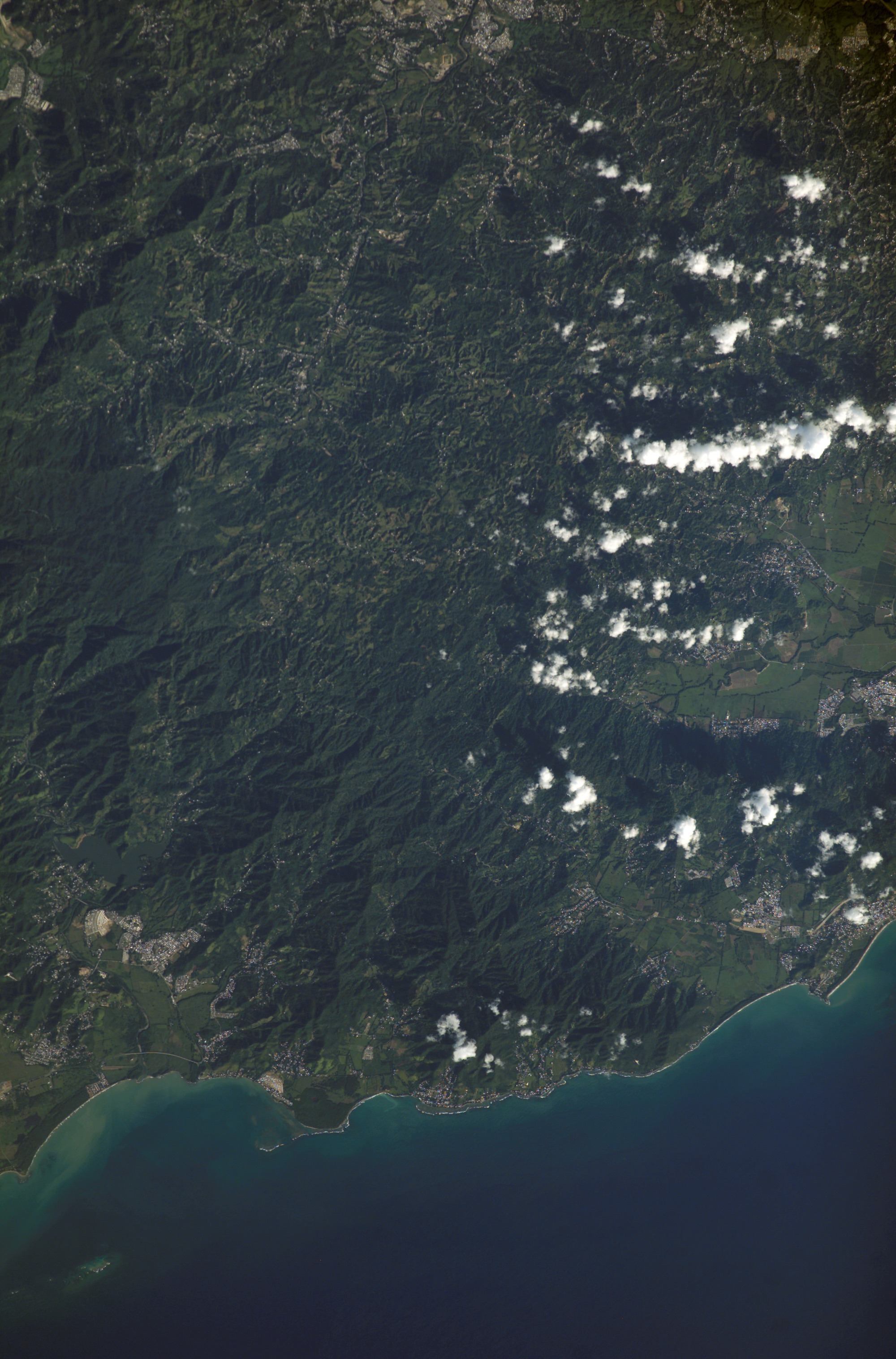
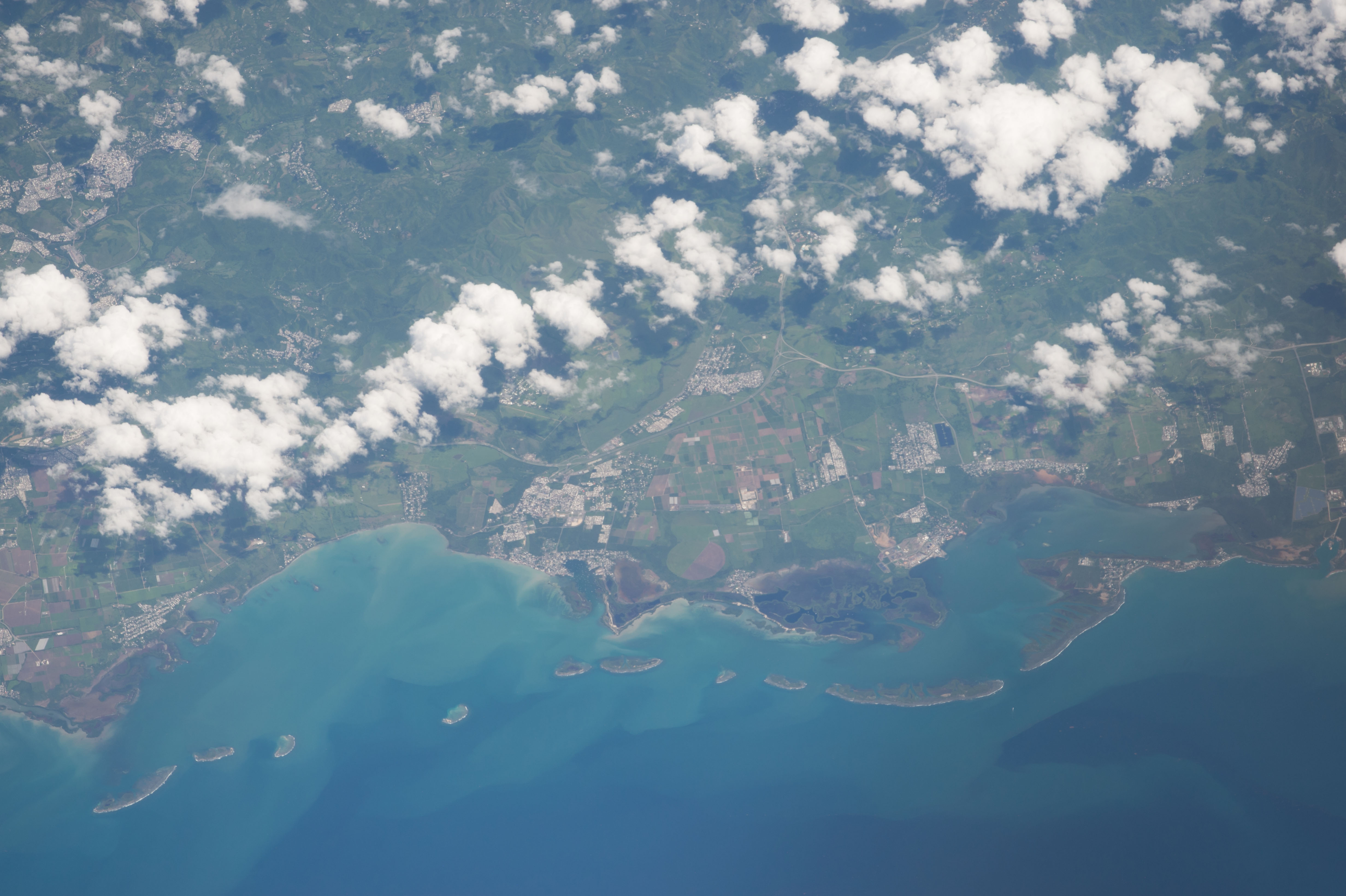
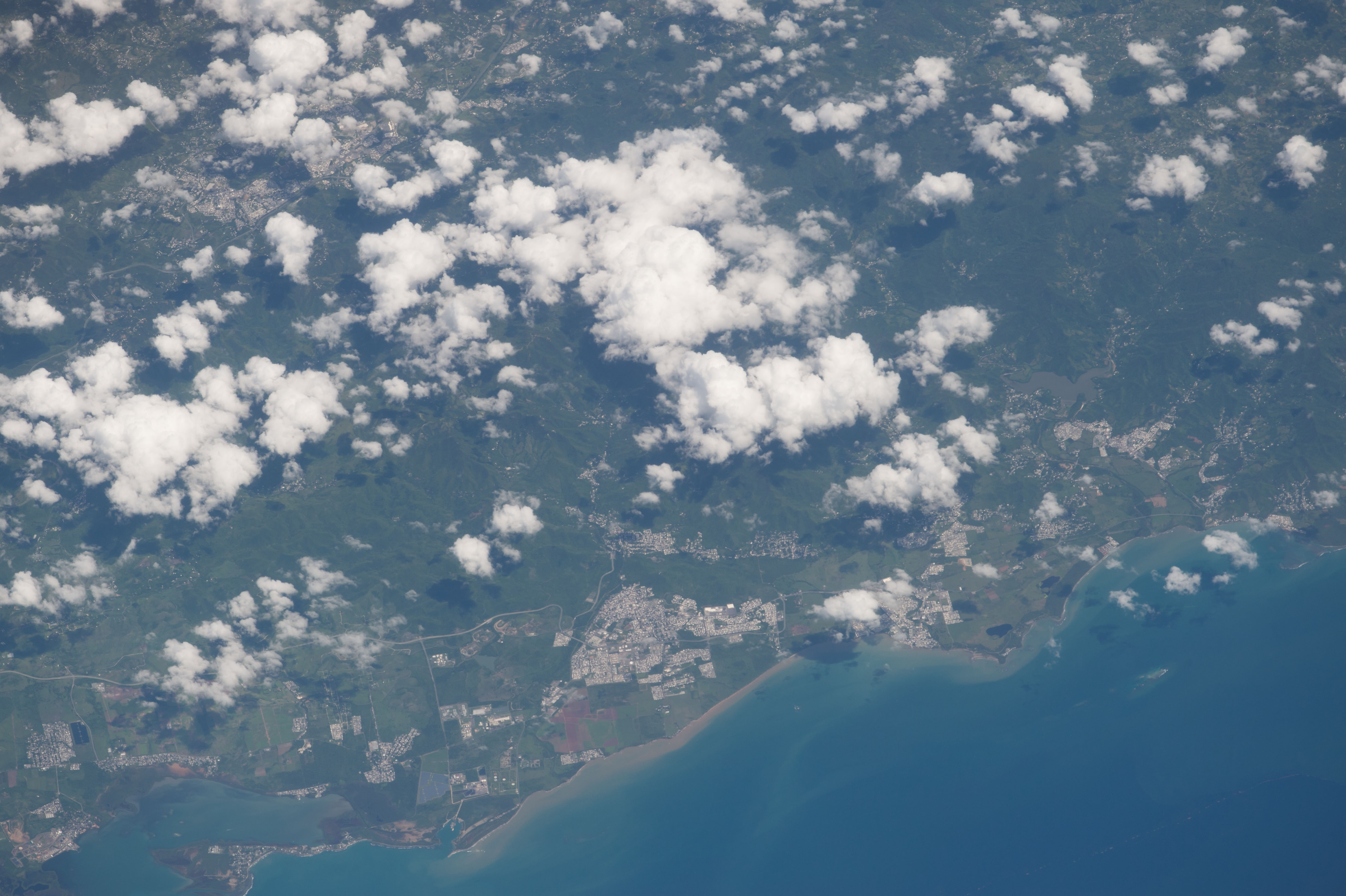
- San Juan metropolitan area in southeastern Puerto Rico Aibonito and Salinas Cayey and Guayama Arroyo and Patillas Patillas and Maunabo Punta Petrona Reserve to Jobos Bay Aguirre Forest to Punta Viento Reserve

- Map of Puerto Rico with urban areas demarcated in orange to yellow
Statistical areas in Puerto Rico
Guayama MSA within San Juan–Bayamón CSA
Core municipalities of San Juan–Bayamón–Caguas MSA within San Juan–Bayamón CSA
Outer municipalities of San Juan–Bayamón–Caguas MSA within San Juan–Bayamón CSA
Arecibo MSA within San Juan–Bayamón CSA
Lares μSA within San Juan–Bayamón CSA
Utuado μSA within San Juan–Bayamón CSA
Coco μSA within San Juan–Bayamón CSA
Mayagüez–Aguadilla CSA & Ponce–Coamo CSA
Municipalities outside statistical areas
- Country: United States
- Territory: Puerto Rico
- Principal city: Guayama

Population (2023)
  - Total: 65,190
- Time zone: UTC−4
  - Summer (DST): EDT

The Guayama metropolitan area (Spanish: área metropolitana de Guayama), is the smallest metropolitan statistical area (MSA) in Puerto Rico, comprising the municipalities of Guayama, Patillas, and Arroyo between the coastal plain and the Sierra de Cayey mountain subrange in the southeastern region of the main island. One of 6 metropolitan statistical areas in Puerto Rico, it lies within the San Juan–Bayamón combined statistical area (CSA), which is one of 3 primary statistical areas in the main island as defined by the United States Census Bureau. As of 2023, census estimates place the population of the Guayama metropolitan area at 65,190.

== Guayama metropolitan area ==
With an estimated population of 65,190 as of 2023, the Guayama metropolitan area (MSA) is the sixth and last populous in Puerto Rico, covering 3 of 78 municipalities in the southeastern region of the main island. Guayama is considered to be its principal city. The Guayama metropolitan area is the 384th most populated in the United States between the Lewiston, ID-WA MSA and the Enid, OK MSA.

The 2020 Census placed the population at 68,442, a 18.73% decrease over the 2010 Census figure of 84,214, which was a 0.83% increase over the 2000 census figure of 83,570.

=== Municipalities ===
- Guayama metropolitan statistical area (MSA) (3 municipalities)
  - Guayama Pop: 34,765
  - Patillas Pop: 15,347
  - Arroyo Pop: 15,078

=== Topography ===

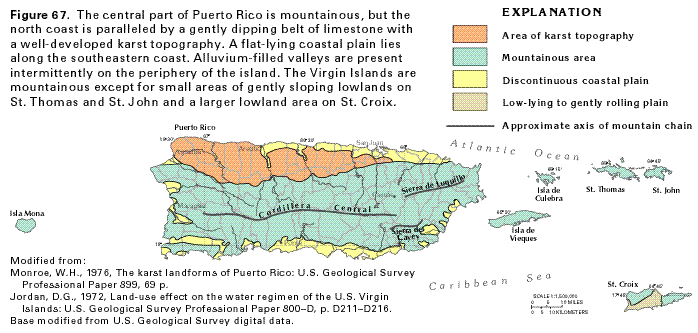
General physiographic map of Puerto Rico, with mountainous terrain in green, karst in orange, and plains in yellow

Comprising Guayama, Patillas, and Arroyo, the Guayanilla metropolitan area is situated between the southern coastal plains and the Sierra de Cayey mountain subrange in the southeastern region of the main island of Puerto Rico.

All municipalities have an urbanized, densely populated downtown area and administrative center, categorized as a barrio and known as a pueblo, and concentrated urbanized residential areas with large populations at their low-lying coastlines in the south. All municipales have rural areas within the Sierra de Cayey mountain subrange in the north.

== See also ==
- Puerto Rico census statistical areas
