= Puerto Rico statistical areas =

Coordinates: 18.2223°N 66.4303°W

The Commonwealth of Puerto Rico currently has 13 statistical areas that have been delineated by the United States Office of Management and Budget (OMB). On July 21, 2023, the OMB delineated three combined statistical areas, six metropolitan statistical areas, and four micropolitan statistical areas in Puerto Rico. As of 2025, the largest of these is the San Juan-Bayamón, PR CSA, comprising the area around the municipality of San Juan, the capital and largest city of Puerto Rico.

== Statistical areas ==
The Office of Management and Budget (OMB) has designated more than 1,000 statistical areas for the United States and Puerto Rico. These statistical areas are important geographic delineations of population clusters used by the OMB, the United States Census Bureau, planning organizations, and federal, state, and local government entities.

The OMB defines a core-based statistical area (CBSA) as the county or counties (or county-equivalents) surrounding at least one densely-settled core of at least 10,000 population, "plus adjacent counties having a high degree of social and economic integration with the core as measured through commuting ties with the counties containing the core". The OMB further divides a CBSA based on population into a metropolitan statistical area (MSA) for those with at least 50,000 people or a micropolitan statistical area (μSA) for those with 10,000 to 49,999 people.

The OMB defines a combined statistical area (CSA) as two or more adjacent CBSAs where the employment interchange rate (percent commuting from A to B plus percent commuting from B to A) is at least 15%. A primary statistical area (PSA) includes all CSAs and any CBSA that is not a constituent of a combined statistical area.

The 13 United States statistical areas and 78 municipios of the Commonwealth of Puerto Rico
Combined statistical area	2025 population (est.)	Core-based statistical area	2025 population (est.)	Municipio	2025 population (est.)
San Juan-Bayamón, PR CSA	2,346,144	San Juan-Bayamón-Caguas, PR MSA	2,024,195	San Juan Municipio	329,737
San Juan-Bayamón, PR CSA	2,346,144	San Juan-Bayamón-Caguas, PR MSA	2,024,195	Bayamón Municipio	180,562
San Juan-Bayamón, PR CSA	2,346,144	San Juan-Bayamón-Caguas, PR MSA	2,024,195	Carolina Municipio	149,874
San Juan-Bayamón, PR CSA	2,346,144	San Juan-Bayamón-Caguas, PR MSA	2,024,195	Caguas Municipio	124,161
San Juan-Bayamón, PR CSA	2,346,144	San Juan-Bayamón-Caguas, PR MSA	2,024,195	Guaynabo Municipio	89,055
San Juan-Bayamón, PR CSA	2,346,144	San Juan-Bayamón-Caguas, PR MSA	2,024,195	Toa Baja Municipio	70,931
San Juan-Bayamón, PR CSA	2,346,144	San Juan-Bayamón-Caguas, PR MSA	2,024,195	Trujillo Alto Municipio	66,348
San Juan-Bayamón, PR CSA	2,346,144	San Juan-Bayamón-Caguas, PR MSA	2,024,195	Toa Alta Municipio	65,754
San Juan-Bayamón, PR CSA	2,346,144	San Juan-Bayamón-Caguas, PR MSA	2,024,195	Vega Baja Municipio	53,505
San Juan-Bayamón, PR CSA	2,346,144	San Juan-Bayamón-Caguas, PR MSA	2,024,195	Humacao Municipio	49,249
San Juan-Bayamón, PR CSA	2,346,144	San Juan-Bayamón-Caguas, PR MSA	2,024,195	Río Grande Municipio	44,799
San Juan-Bayamón, PR CSA	2,346,144	San Juan-Bayamón-Caguas, PR MSA	2,024,195	Canóvanas Municipio	41,302
San Juan-Bayamón, PR CSA	2,346,144	San Juan-Bayamón-Caguas, PR MSA	2,024,195	Cayey Municipio	40,027
San Juan-Bayamón, PR CSA	2,346,144	San Juan-Bayamón-Caguas, PR MSA	2,024,195	Gurabo Municipio	39,780
San Juan-Bayamón, PR CSA	2,346,144	San Juan-Bayamón-Caguas, PR MSA	2,024,195	Cidra Municipio	39,669
San Juan-Bayamón, PR CSA	2,346,144	San Juan-Bayamón-Caguas, PR MSA	2,024,195	Manatí Municipio	38,413
San Juan-Bayamón, PR CSA	2,346,144	San Juan-Bayamón-Caguas, PR MSA	2,024,195	San Lorenzo Municipio	37,275
San Juan-Bayamón, PR CSA	2,346,144	San Juan-Bayamón-Caguas, PR MSA	2,024,195	Juncos Municipio	36,639
San Juan-Bayamón, PR CSA	2,346,144	San Juan-Bayamón-Caguas, PR MSA	2,024,195	Dorado Municipio	35,891
San Juan-Bayamón, PR CSA	2,346,144	San Juan-Bayamón-Caguas, PR MSA	2,024,195	Las Piedras Municipio	34,723
San Juan-Bayamón, PR CSA	2,346,144	San Juan-Bayamón-Caguas, PR MSA	2,024,195	Corozal Municipio	34,531
San Juan-Bayamón, PR CSA	2,346,144	San Juan-Bayamón-Caguas, PR MSA	2,024,195	Vega Alta Municipio	34,351
San Juan-Bayamón, PR CSA	2,346,144	San Juan-Bayamón-Caguas, PR MSA	2,024,195	Fajardo Municipio	30,780
San Juan-Bayamón, PR CSA	2,346,144	San Juan-Bayamón-Caguas, PR MSA	2,024,195	Naranjito Municipio	29,627
San Juan-Bayamón, PR CSA	2,346,144	San Juan-Bayamón-Caguas, PR MSA	2,024,195	Barranquitas Municipio	29,509
San Juan-Bayamón, PR CSA	2,346,144	San Juan-Bayamón-Caguas, PR MSA	2,024,195	Morovis Municipio	28,170
San Juan-Bayamón, PR CSA	2,346,144	San Juan-Bayamón-Caguas, PR MSA	2,024,195	Yabucoa Municipio	28,058
San Juan-Bayamón, PR CSA	2,346,144	San Juan-Bayamón-Caguas, PR MSA	2,024,195	Aibonito Municipio	24,746
San Juan-Bayamón, PR CSA	2,346,144	San Juan-Bayamón-Caguas, PR MSA	2,024,195	Aguas Buenas Municipio	22,838
San Juan-Bayamón, PR CSA	2,346,144	San Juan-Bayamón-Caguas, PR MSA	2,024,195	Naguabo Municipio	22,666
San Juan-Bayamón, PR CSA	2,346,144	San Juan-Bayamón-Caguas, PR MSA	2,024,195	Barceloneta Municipio	22,316
San Juan-Bayamón, PR CSA	2,346,144	San Juan-Bayamón-Caguas, PR MSA	2,024,195	Cataño Municipio	21,701
San Juan-Bayamón, PR CSA	2,346,144	San Juan-Bayamón-Caguas, PR MSA	2,024,195	Loíza Municipio	21,542
San Juan-Bayamón, PR CSA	2,346,144	San Juan-Bayamón-Caguas, PR MSA	2,024,195	Orocovis Municipio	21,329
San Juan-Bayamón, PR CSA	2,346,144	San Juan-Bayamón-Caguas, PR MSA	2,024,195	Comerío Municipio	18,445
San Juan-Bayamón, PR CSA	2,346,144	San Juan-Bayamón-Caguas, PR MSA	2,024,195	Luquillo Municipio	17,190
San Juan-Bayamón, PR CSA	2,346,144	San Juan-Bayamón-Caguas, PR MSA	2,024,195	Ciales Municipio	16,652
San Juan-Bayamón, PR CSA	2,346,144	San Juan-Bayamón-Caguas, PR MSA	2,024,195	Florida Municipio	11,371
San Juan-Bayamón, PR CSA	2,346,144	San Juan-Bayamón-Caguas, PR MSA	2,024,195	Ceiba Municipio	10,559
San Juan-Bayamón, PR CSA	2,346,144	San Juan-Bayamón-Caguas, PR MSA	2,024,195	Maunabo Municipio	10,120
San Juan-Bayamón, PR CSA	2,346,144	Arecibo, PR MSA	179,229	Arecibo Municipio	85,539
San Juan-Bayamón, PR CSA	2,346,144	Arecibo, PR MSA	179,229	Hatillo Municipio	37,810
San Juan-Bayamón, PR CSA	2,346,144	Arecibo, PR MSA	179,229	Camuy Municipio	32,691
San Juan-Bayamón, PR CSA	2,346,144	Arecibo, PR MSA	179,229	Quebradillas Municipio	23,189
San Juan-Bayamón, PR CSA	2,346,144	Guayama, PR MSA	63,864	Guayama Municipio	34,043
San Juan-Bayamón, PR CSA	2,346,144	Guayama, PR MSA	63,864	Patillas Municipio	15,077
San Juan-Bayamón, PR CSA	2,346,144	Guayama, PR MSA	63,864	Arroyo Municipio	14,744
San Juan-Bayamón, PR CSA	2,346,144	Lares, PR μSA	27,744	Lares Municipio	27,744
San Juan-Bayamón, PR CSA	2,346,144	Utuado, PR μSA	26,894	Utuado Municipio	26,894
San Juan-Bayamón, PR CSA	2,346,144	Coco, PR μSA	24,218	Salinas Municipio	24,218
Mayagüez-Aguadilla, PR CSA	456,443	Aguadilla, PR MSA	250,088	Aguadilla Municipio	53,219
Mayagüez-Aguadilla, PR CSA	456,443	Aguadilla, PR MSA	250,088	Isabela Municipio	42,938
Mayagüez-Aguadilla, PR CSA	456,443	Aguadilla, PR MSA	250,088	San Sebastián Municipio	39,019
Mayagüez-Aguadilla, PR CSA	456,443	Aguadilla, PR MSA	250,088	Moca Municipio	37,562
Mayagüez-Aguadilla, PR CSA	456,443	Aguadilla, PR MSA	250,088	Aguada Municipio	37,319
Mayagüez-Aguadilla, PR CSA	456,443	Aguadilla, PR MSA	250,088	Añasco Municipio	24,449
Mayagüez-Aguadilla, PR CSA	456,443	Aguadilla, PR MSA	250,088	Rincón Municipio	15,582
Mayagüez-Aguadilla, PR CSA	456,443	Mayagüez, PR MSA	206,355	Mayagüez Municipio	68,905
Mayagüez-Aguadilla, PR CSA	456,443	Mayagüez, PR MSA	206,355	Cabo Rojo Municipio	46,580
Mayagüez-Aguadilla, PR CSA	456,443	Mayagüez, PR MSA	206,355	San Germán Municipio	30,809
Mayagüez-Aguadilla, PR CSA	456,443	Mayagüez, PR MSA	206,355	Lajas Municipio	22,784
Mayagüez-Aguadilla, PR CSA	456,443	Mayagüez, PR MSA	206,355	Sabana Grande Municipio	22,055
Mayagüez-Aguadilla, PR CSA	456,443	Mayagüez, PR MSA	206,355	Hormigueros Municipio	15,222
Ponce-Coamo, PR CSA	315,415	Ponce, PR MSA	262,792	Ponce Municipio	128,384
Ponce-Coamo, PR CSA	315,415	Ponce, PR MSA	262,792	Juana Díaz Municipio	45,853
Ponce-Coamo, PR CSA	315,415	Ponce, PR MSA	262,792	Yauco Municipio	31,608
Ponce-Coamo, PR CSA	315,415	Ponce, PR MSA	262,792	Villalba Municipio	21,133
Ponce-Coamo, PR CSA	315,415	Ponce, PR MSA	262,792	Peñuelas Municipio	19,325
Ponce-Coamo, PR CSA	315,415	Ponce, PR MSA	262,792	Guayanilla Municipio	16,489
Ponce-Coamo, PR CSA	315,415	Coamo, PR μSA	52,623	Coamo Municipio	33,076
Ponce-Coamo, PR CSA	315,415	Coamo, PR μSA	52,623	Santa Isabel Municipio	19,547
none				Adjuntas Municipio	17,994
none				Jayuya Municipio	14,423
none				Guánica Municipio	11,840
none				Las Marías Municipio	8,638
none				Vieques Municipio	7,867
none				Maricao Municipio	4,336
none				Culebra Municipio	1,735
Commonwealth of Puerto Rico					3,184,835

The 10 core-based statistical areas of the Commonwealth of Puerto Rico
2023 rank	Core-based statistical area	Population				
2023 rank	Core-based statistical area	2025 estimate	Change	2020 Census	Change	2010 Census
1	San Juan-Bayamón-Caguas, PR MSA	2,024,195	−2.74%	2,081,265	−11.44%	2,350,126
2	Ponce, PR MSA	262,792	−11.37%	296,497	−15.42%	350,536
3	Aguadilla, PR MSA	250,088	−1.45%	253,768	−7.90%	275,539
4	Mayagüez, PR MSA	206,355	−3.50%	213,831	−12.29%	243,792
5	Arecibo, PR MSA	179,229	−1.90%	182,705	−8.41%	199,471
6	Guayama, PR MSA	63,864	−6.69%	68,442	−18.73%	84,214
7	Coamo, PR μSA	52,623	−4.23%	54,949	−13.85%	63,786
8	Lares, PR μSA	27,744	−1.28%	28,105	−8.61%	30,753
9	Utuado, PR μSA	26,894	−4.92%	28,287	−14.67%	33,149
10	Coco, PR μSA	24,218	−6.09%	25,789	−17.02%	31,078

The three combined statistical areas of the Commonwealth of Puerto Rico
2023 rank	Combined statistical area	Population				
2023 rank	Combined statistical area	2025 estimate	Change	2020 Census	Change	2010 Census
1	San Juan-Bayamón, PR CSA	2,346,144	−2.83%	2,414,593	−11.51%	2,728,791
2	Mayagüez-Aguadilla, PR CSA	456,443	−2.39%	467,599	−9.96%	519,331
3	Ponce-Coamo, PR CSA	315,415	−10.25%	351,446	−15.18%	414,322

== See also ==
- Geography of Puerto Rico
  - Demographics of Puerto Rico
