= Principal city =

Core city of a United States metropolitan area

In the United States, a principal city is the largest incorporated place with a population of at least 10,000 in a core-based statistical area (CBSA) or New England city and town area (NECTA), or if no incorporated place of at least 10,000 population is present in the CBSA or NECTA, the largest incorporated place or census-designated place (CDP) in the CBSA or NECTA. Additional places that meet specific criteria are also identified as principal cities. The title of each metropolitan or micropolitan statistical area consists of the names of up to three of its principal cities and the name of each state into which the metropolitan or micropolitan statistical area extends.

In the United States and Puerto Rico, the Office of Management and Budget identifies principal cities for each core-based statistical area (CBSA) and New England city and town area (NECTA). Principal cities are used primarily for naming CBSAs and NECTAs, and combined statistical areas and combined NECTAs.

== Definition ==
The largest incorporated place in a CBSA with a population of at least 10,000, or if no such incorporated place exists, the largest incorporated place or census-designated place in the CBSA is designated as the largest principal city. Additional principal cities can be included if they satisfy certain criteria depending on their population. These additional principal cities are: (a) incorporated or census-designated places that have a population of at least 250,000 in which the number of workers is 100,000 or more; (b) places with a population between 50,000 and 250,000 where the number of workers working in the place exceeds the number of working residents; and (c) places with a population between 10,000 and 50,000 where the number of workers working in the place exceeds the number of working residents and are at least one-third the population of the largest principal city. Principal cities encompass both incorporated places and census-designated places (CDPs). In addition to identifying the more significant places in each CBSA or NECTA in terms of population and employment, principal cities also are used in titling metropolitan divisions, combined statistical areas, NECTA divisions, and combined NECTAs. The names of up to three principal cities are used in determining the title of the CBSA and NECTA. The first principal city named in the title is identified as the first principal city of the area.

Most recently on February 28, 2013, the Office of Management and Budget identified from one to 19 principal cities (in the Los Angeles metropolitan area) for each of the 929 CBSAs and 38 NECTAs of the United States and Puerto Rico.

A principal city must be incorporated under state law, but it need not be classified as a city under state law; for example, Kiryas Joel is listed by the OMB as the largest principal city of the Kiryas Joel–Poughkeepsie–Newburgh metropolitan area, despite the fact that under New York state law it is classified as a village not a city.

== See also ==
- United States of America
  - Outline of the United States
  - Index of United States-related articles
- Demographics of the United States
  - United States Census Bureau
    - List of U.S. states and territories by population
    - List of metropolitan areas of the United States
    - List of United States cities by population
  - United States Office of Management and Budget
    - Statistical area (United States)
      - Combined statistical area (list)
      - Core-based statistical area (list)
        - Metropolitan statistical area (list)
        - Micropolitan statistical area (list)
