= List of core-based statistical areas =

Major statistical areas of the United States and Puerto Rico

The United States Office of Management and Budget (OMB) has defined 935 core-based statistical areas (CBSAs) for the United States and 10 for Puerto Rico. The OMB defines a core-based statistical area as one or more adjacent counties or county equivalents that have at least one urban core area of at least 10,000 population, plus adjacent territory that has a high degree of social and economic integration with the core as measured by commuting ties. The 935 core-based statistical areas currently defined by the OMB include the 393 metropolitan statistical areas (MSAs), which have an urban core population of at least 50,000, and the 542 micropolitan statistical areas (μSAs), which have an urban core population of at least 10,000 but less than 50,000.

== United States ==
Location of the 20 largest CBSAs in the United States, based on U.S. Census Bureau estimates for July 1, 2025

An enlargeable map of the 935 core-based statistical areas (CBSAs) of the United States and Puerto Rico as of 2023. The 393 metropolitan statistical areas (MSAs) are shown in medium green. The 542 micropolitan statistical areas (μSAs) are shown in light green.

The following sortable table lists the 925 core-based statistical areas (CBSAs) of the United States with the following information:

1. The CBSA rank by population as of July 1, 2025, as estimated by the United States Census Bureau
2. The CBSA name as designated by the United States Office of Management and Budget
3. The CBSA population as of July 1, 2025, as estimated by the United States Census Bureau
4. The CBSA population as of April 1, 2020, as enumerated by the 2020 United States census
5. The percent CBSA population change from April 1, 2020, to July 1, 2025
6. The Combined statistical area (CSA) if the CBSA is a component

The 925 core-based statistical areas of the United States of America
Core-based statistical area	2025 estimate	2020 Census	Change	Encompassing combined statistical area
New York-Newark-Jersey City, NY-NJ MSA	20,112,448	20,081,935	+0.15%	New York-Newark, NY-NJ-CT-PA CSA
Los Angeles-Long Beach-Anaheim, CA MSA	12,844,441	13,200,998	−2.70%	Los Angeles-Long Beach, CA CSA
Chicago-Naperville-Elgin, IL-IN MSA	9,434,123	9,449,351	−0.16%	Chicago-Naperville, IL-IN-WI CSA
Dallas-Fort Worth-Arlington, TX MSA	8,477,157	7,637,387	+11.00%	Dallas-Fort Worth, TX-OK CSA
Houston-Pasadena-The Woodlands, TX MSA	7,904,627	7,149,642	+10.56%	Houston-Pasadena, TX CSA
Atlanta-Sandy Springs-Roswell, GA MSA	6,482,182	6,104,803	+6.18%	Atlanta--Athens-Clarke County--Sandy Springs, GA-AL CSA
Washington-Arlington-Alexandria, DC-VA-MD-WV MSA	6,465,724	6,278,542	+2.98%	Washington-Baltimore-Arlington, DC-MD-VA-WV-PA CSA
Miami-Fort Lauderdale-West Palm Beach, FL MSA	6,391,072	6,138,333	+4.12%	Miami-Port St. Lucie-Fort Lauderdale, FL CSA
Philadelphia-Camden-Wilmington, PA-NJ-DE-MD MSA	6,329,118	6,245,051	+1.35%	Philadelphia-Reading-Camden, PA-NJ-DE-MD CSA
Phoenix-Mesa-Chandler, AZ MSA	5,228,938	4,845,832	+7.91%	Phoenix-Mesa, AZ CSA
Boston-Cambridge-Newton, MA-NH MSA	5,034,221	4,941,632	+1.87%	Boston-Worcester-Providence, MA-RI-NH CSA
Riverside-San Bernardino-Ontario, CA MSA	4,769,007	4,599,839	+3.68%	Los Angeles-Long Beach, CA CSA
San Francisco-Oakland-Fremont, CA MSA	4,630,041	4,749,008	−2.51%	San Jose-San Francisco-Oakland, CA CSA
Detroit-Warren-Dearborn, MI MSA	4,390,913	4,392,041	−0.03%	Detroit-Warren-Ann Arbor, MI CSA
Seattle-Tacoma-Bellevue, WA MSA	4,161,883	4,018,762	+3.56%	Seattle-Tacoma, WA CSA
Minneapolis-St. Paul-Bloomington, MN-WI MSA	3,790,295	3,690,261	+2.71%	Minneapolis-St. Paul, MN-WI CSA
Tampa-St. Petersburg-Clearwater, FL MSA	3,418,895	3,175,275	+7.67%	
San Diego-Chula Vista-Carlsbad, CA MSA	3,282,248	3,298,634	−0.50%	
Denver-Aurora-Centennial, CO MSA	3,092,037	2,963,821	+4.33%	Denver-Aurora-Greeley, CO CSA
Orlando-Kissimmee-Sanford, FL MSA	2,957,672	2,673,376	+10.63%	Orlando-Lakeland-Deltona, FL CSA
Charlotte-Concord-Gastonia, NC-SC MSA	2,938,830	2,660,329	+10.47%	Charlotte-Concord, NC-SC CSA
Baltimore-Columbia-Towson, MD MSA	2,857,781	2,844,510	+0.47%	Washington-Baltimore-Arlington, DC-MD-VA-WV-PA CSA
St. Louis, MO-IL MSA	2,814,421	2,820,253	−0.21%	St. Louis-St. Charles-Farmington, MO-IL CSA
San Antonio-New Braunfels, TX MSA	2,813,140	2,558,143	+9.97%	San Antonio-New Braunfels-Kerrville, TX CSA
Austin-Round Rock-San Marcos, TX MSA	2,620,945	2,283,371	+14.78%	
Portland-Vancouver-Hillsboro, OR-WA MSA	2,542,282	2,512,859	+1.17%	Portland-Vancouver-Salem, OR-WA CSA
Sacramento-Roseville-Folsom, CA MSA	2,477,274	2,397,382	+3.33%	Sacramento-Roseville, CA CSA
Pittsburgh, PA MSA	2,421,992	2,457,000	−1.42%	Pittsburgh-Weirton-Steubenville, PA-OH-WV CSA
Las Vegas-Henderson-North Las Vegas, NV MSA	2,407,226	2,265,461	+6.26%	Las Vegas-Henderson, NV CSA
Cincinnati, OH-KY-IN MSA	2,312,858	2,249,797	+2.80%	Cincinnati-Wilmington, OH-KY-IN CSA
Kansas City, MO-KS MSA	2,270,682	2,192,035	+3.59%	Kansas City-Overland Park-Kansas City, MO-KS CSA
Columbus, OH MSA	2,242,028	2,138,926	+4.82%	Columbus-Marion-Zanesville, OH CSA
Indianapolis-Carmel-Greenwood, IN MSA	2,205,695	2,089,673	+5.55%	Indianapolis-Carmel-Muncie, IN CSA
Nashville-Davidson--Murfreesboro--Franklin, TN MSA	2,197,416	2,014,444	+9.08%	Nashville-Davidson--Murfreesboro, TN CSA
Cleveland, OH MSA	2,165,775	2,185,825	−0.92%	Cleveland-Akron-Canton, OH CSA
San Jose-Sunnyvale-Santa Clara, CA MSA	1,984,473	2,000,468	−0.80%	San Jose-San Francisco-Oakland, CA CSA
Virginia Beach-Chesapeake-Norfolk, VA-NC MSA	1,797,213	1,780,059	+0.96%	Virginia Beach-Chesapeake, VA-NC CSA
Jacksonville, FL MSA	1,785,500	1,605,848	+11.19%	Jacksonville-Kingsland-Palatka, FL-GA CSA
Providence-Warwick, RI-MA MSA	1,708,161	1,676,579	+1.88%	Boston-Worcester-Providence, MA-RI-NH CSA
Raleigh-Cary, NC MSA	1,595,720	1,413,982	+12.85%	Raleigh-Durham-Cary, NC CSA
Milwaukee-Waukesha, WI MSA	1,575,010	1,574,731	+0.02%	Milwaukee-Racine-Waukesha, WI CSA
Oklahoma City, OK MSA	1,512,813	1,425,695	+6.11%	Oklahoma City-Shawnee, OK CSA
Louisville/Jefferson County, KY-IN MSA	1,402,509	1,362,180	+2.96%	Louisville/Jefferson County--Elizabethtown, KY-IN CSA
Richmond, VA MSA	1,389,338	1,314,434	+5.70%	
Memphis, TN-MS-AR MSA	1,341,412	1,345,425	−0.30%	Memphis-Clarksdale-Forrest City, TN-MS-AR CSA
Salt Lake City-Murray, UT MSA	1,308,377	1,257,936	+4.01%	Salt Lake City-Provo-Orem, UT-ID CSA
Fresno, CA MSA	1,203,383	1,164,909	+3.30%	Fresno-Hanford-Corcoran, CA CSA
Birmingham, AL MSA	1,197,766	1,180,631	+1.45%	Birmingham-Cullman-Talladega, AL CSA
Grand Rapids-Wyoming-Kentwood, MI MSA	1,183,645	1,150,015	+2.92%	Grand Rapids-Wyoming, MI CSA
Hartford-West Hartford-East Hartford, CT MSA	1,171,426	1,150,473	+1.82%	New Haven-Hartford-Waterbury, CT CSA
Buffalo-Cheektowaga, NY MSA	1,155,653	1,166,902	−0.96%	Buffalo-Cheektowaga-Olean, NY CSA
Tucson, AZ MSA	1,074,685	1,043,433	+3.00%	Tucson-Nogales, AZ CSA
Tulsa, OK MSA	1,069,273	1,015,331	+5.31%	Tulsa-Bartlesville-Muskogee, OK CSA
Rochester, NY MSA	1,056,149	1,065,361	−0.86%	Rochester-Batavia-Seneca Falls, NY CSA
Greenville-Anderson-Greer, SC MSA	1,014,101	928,195	+9.26%	Greenville-Spartanburg-Anderson, SC CSA
Omaha, NE-IA MSA	1,009,836	967,604	+4.36%	Omaha-Fremont, NE-IA CSA
Urban Honolulu, HI MSA	988,703	1,016,508	−2.74%	
Bridgeport-Stamford-Danbury, CT MSA	978,179	946,327	+3.37%	New York-Newark, NY-NJ-CT-PA CSA
New Orleans-Metairie, LA MSA	970,849	1,007,275	−3.62%	New Orleans-Metairie-Slidell, LA-MS CSA
Knoxville, TN MSA	968,137	903,300	+7.18%	Knoxville-Morristown-Sevierville, TN CSA
North Port-Bradenton-Sarasota, FL MSA	948,158	833,716	+13.73%	North Port-Bradenton, FL CSA
Bakersfield-Delano, CA MSA	927,068	909,235	+1.96%	
Albuquerque, NM MSA	925,279	916,528	+0.95%	Albuquerque-Santa Fe-Los Alamos, NM CSA
McAllen-Edinburg-Mission, TX MSA	921,549	870,781	+5.83%	McAllen-Edinburg, TX CSA
Albany-Schenectady-Troy, NY MSA	915,835	899,262	+1.84%	Albany-Schenectady, NY CSA
Charleston-North Charleston, SC MSA	889,263	799,636	+11.21%	
Baton Rouge, LA MSA	888,699	870,569	+2.08%	Baton Rouge-Hammond, LA CSA
Worcester, MA MSA	888,502	862,111	+3.06%	Boston-Worcester-Providence, MA-RI-NH CSA
Allentown-Bethlehem-Easton, PA-NJ MSA	887,615	861,889	+2.98%	Allentown-Bethlehem-East Stroudsburg, PA-NJ CSA
El Paso, TX MSA	881,291	868,859	+1.43%	El Paso-Las Cruces, TX-NM CSA
Columbia, SC MSA	879,918	829,470	+6.08%	Columbia-Sumter-Orangeburg, SC CSA
Cape Coral-Fort Myers, FL MSA	875,607	760,822	+15.09%	Cape Coral-Fort Myers-Naples, FL CSA
Lakeland-Winter Haven, FL MSA	874,790	725,046	+20.65%	Orlando-Lakeland-Deltona, FL CSA
Boise City, ID MSA	864,243	764,718	+13.01%	Boise City-Mountain Home-Ontario, ID-OR CSA
Oxnard-Thousand Oaks-Ventura, CA MSA	830,851	843,843	−1.54%	Los Angeles-Long Beach, CA CSA
Dayton-Kettering-Beavercreek, OH MSA	826,554	814,049	+1.54%	Dayton-Springfield-Kettering, OH CSA
Stockton-Lodi, CA MSA	823,815	779,233	+5.72%	San Jose-San Francisco-Oakland, CA CSA
Greensboro-High Point, NC MSA	805,945	776,566	+3.78%	Greensboro--Winston-Salem--High Point, NC CSA
Colorado Springs, CO MSA	781,796	755,105	+3.53%	
Little Rock-North Little Rock-Conway, AR MSA	777,607	748,031	+3.95%	Little Rock-North Little Rock, AR CSA
Provo-Orem-Lehi, UT MSA	773,426	671,185	+15.23%	Salt Lake City-Provo-Orem, UT-ID CSA
Des Moines-West Des Moines, IA MSA	758,539	709,466	+6.92%	Des Moines-West Des Moines-Ames, IA CSA
Deltona-Daytona Beach-Ormond Beach, FL MSA	746,933	668,921	+11.66%	Orlando-Lakeland-Deltona, FL CSA
Kiryas Joel-Poughkeepsie-Newburgh, NY MSA	718,377	697,221	+3.03%	New York-Newark, NY-NJ-CT-PA CSA
Winston-Salem, NC MSA	712,206	675,966	+5.36%	Greensboro--Winston-Salem--High Point, NC CSA
Madison, WI MSA	709,685	680,796	+4.24%	Madison-Janesville-Beloit, WI CSA
Akron, OH MSA	701,780	702,219	−0.06%	Cleveland-Akron-Canton, OH CSA
Ogden, UT MSA	672,784	637,197	+5.58%	Salt Lake City-Provo-Orem, UT-ID CSA
Palm Bay-Melbourne-Titusville, FL MSA	663,982	606,612	+9.46%	
Wichita, KS MSA	663,809	647,610	+2.50%	Wichita-Arkansas City-Winfield, KS CSA
Syracuse, NY MSA	652,273	662,057	−1.48%	Syracuse-Auburn, NY CSA
Augusta-Richmond County, GA-SC MSA	641,231	611,000	+4.95%	
Durham-Chapel Hill, NC MSA	625,485	588,911	+6.21%	Raleigh-Durham-Cary, NC CSA
Fayetteville-Springdale-Rogers, AR MSA	622,177	546,725	+13.80%	
Harrisburg-Carlisle, PA MSA	617,427	591,712	+4.35%	Harrisburg-York-Lebanon, PA CSA
Jackson, MS MSA	609,847	619,968	−1.63%	Jackson-Vicksburg-Brookhaven, MS CSA
Spokane-Spokane Valley, WA MSA	608,012	585,784	+3.79%	Spokane-Spokane Valley-Coeur d'Alene, WA-ID CSA
Toledo, OH MSA	599,376	606,240	−1.13%	
Chattanooga, TN-GA MSA	594,530	562,647	+5.67%	Chattanooga-Cleveland-Dalton, TN-GA-AL CSA
New Haven, CT MSA	578,741	570,487	+1.45%	New Haven-Hartford-Waterbury, CT CSA
Reno, NV MSA	578,734	549,831	+5.26%	Reno-Carson City-Gardnerville Ranchos, NV-CA CSA
Portland-South Portland, ME MSA	577,635	551,740	+4.69%	Portland-Lewiston-South Portland, ME CSA
Scranton--Wilkes-Barre, PA MSA	574,418	567,559	+1.21%	
Port St. Lucie, FL MSA	568,721	487,657	+16.62%	Miami-Port St. Lucie-Fort Lauderdale, FL CSA
Lancaster, PA MSA	563,159	552,984	+1.84%	
Modesto, CA MSA	557,719	552,878	+0.88%	San Jose-San Francisco-Oakland, CA CSA
Huntsville, AL MSA	556,444	491,723	+13.16%	Huntsville-Decatur-Albertville, AL-TN CSA
Pensacola-Ferry Pass-Brent, FL MSA	544,949	509,905	+6.87%	
Lexington-Fayette, KY MSA	535,174	516,811	+3.55%	Lexington-Fayette--Richmond--Frankfort, KY CSA
Killeen-Temple, TX MSA	511,497	475,367	+7.60%	
Springfield, MO MSA	500,694	475,432	+5.31%	
Wilmington, NC MSA	492,772	422,598	+16.61%	
Santa Rosa-Petaluma, CA MSA	486,444	488,863	−0.49%	
Visalia, CA MSA	485,146	473,117	+2.54%	
Lansing-East Lansing, MI MSA	479,722	473,203	+1.38%	Lansing-East Lansing-Owosso, MI CSA
York-Hanover, PA MSA	473,197	456,438	+3.67%	Harrisburg-York-Lebanon, PA CSA
Fort Wayne, IN MSA	466,258	447,781	+4.13%	Fort Wayne-Huntington-Auburn, IN CSA
Springfield, MA MSA	464,338	465,825	−0.32%	Springfield-Amherst Town-Northampton, MA CSA
Waterbury-Shelton, CT MSA	463,349	450,376	+2.88%	New Haven-Hartford-Waterbury, CT CSA
Vallejo, CA MSA	455,376	453,491	+0.42%	San Jose-San Francisco-Oakland, CA CSA
Corpus Christi, TX MSA	451,191	445,763	+1.22%	Corpus Christi-Kingsville-Alice, TX CSA
Salem, OR MSA	445,814	433,353	+2.88%	Portland-Vancouver-Salem, OR-WA CSA
Ocala, FL MSA	442,660	375,908	+17.76%	
Santa Maria-Santa Barbara, CA MSA	442,065	448,229	−1.38%	
Reading, PA MSA	440,072	428,849	+2.62%	Philadelphia-Reading-Camden, PA-NJ-DE-MD CSA
Savannah, GA MSA	438,314	404,798	+8.28%	Savannah-Hinesville-Statesboro, GA CSA
Brownsville-Harlingen, TX MSA	433,946	421,017	+3.07%	Brownsville-Harlingen-Raymondville, TX CSA
Salinas, CA MSA	433,729	439,035	−1.21%	
Manchester-Nashua, NH MSA	433,415	422,937	+2.48%	Boston-Worcester-Providence, MA-RI-NH CSA
Gulfport-Biloxi, MS MSA	431,329	416,259	+3.62%	
Myrtle Beach-Conway-North Myrtle Beach, SC MSA	427,551	351,029	+21.80%	Myrtle Beach-Conway, SC CSA
Lafayette, LA MSA	423,758	408,455	+3.75%	Lafayette-New Iberia-Opelousas, LA CSA
Youngstown-Warren, OH MSA	423,678	430,591	−1.61%	Youngstown-Warren-Salem, OH CSA
Asheville, NC MSA	422,345	406,926	+3.79%	Asheville-Waynesville-Brevard, NC CSA
Naples-Marco Island, FL MSA	417,131	375,752	+11.01%	Cape Coral-Fort Myers-Naples, FL CSA
Mobile, AL MSA	411,658	414,809	−0.76%	Mobile-Daphne-Fairhope, AL CSA
Spartanburg, SC MSA	407,656	355,241	+14.75%	Greenville-Spartanburg-Anderson, SC CSA
Anchorage, AK MSA	405,821	398,328	+1.88%	
Flint, MI MSA	401,093	406,211	−1.26%	Detroit-Warren-Ann Arbor, MI CSA
Canton-Massillon, OH MSA	400,246	401,574	−0.33%	Cleveland-Akron-Canton, OH CSA
Beaumont-Port Arthur, TX MSA	399,310	397,565	+0.44%	
Trenton-Princeton, NJ MSA	399,289	387,340	+3.08%	New York-Newark, NY-NJ-CT-PA CSA
Tallahassee, FL MSA	397,442	384,298	+3.42%	Tallahassee-Bainbridge, FL-GA CSA
Fayetteville, NC MSA	395,412	386,810	+2.22%	Fayetteville-Lumberton-Pinehurst, NC CSA
Montgomery, AL MSA	388,747	386,047	+0.70%	Montgomery-Selma, AL CSA
Shreveport-Bossier City, LA MSA	383,474	393,406	−2.52%	Shreveport-Bossier City-Minden, LA CSA
Eugene-Springfield, OR MSA	381,584	382,971	−0.36%	
Davenport-Moline-Rock Island, IA-IL MSA	380,452	384,324	−1.01%	Davenport-Moline, IA-IL CSA
Greeley, CO MSA	378,426	328,981	+15.03%	Denver-Aurora-Greeley, CO CSA
Fort Collins-Loveland, CO MSA	377,292	359,066	+5.08%	
Hickory-Lenoir-Morganton, NC MSA	376,890	365,276	+3.18%	Charlotte-Concord, NC-SC CSA
Atlantic City-Hammonton, NJ MSA	372,047	369,797	+0.61%	Philadelphia-Reading-Camden, PA-NJ-DE-MD CSA
Ann Arbor, MI MSA	370,214	372,258	−0.55%	Detroit-Warren-Ann Arbor, MI CSA
Lubbock, TX MSA	368,431	351,268	+4.89%	Lubbock-Plainview, TX CSA
Huntington-Ashland, WV-KY-OH MSA	365,965	376,155	−2.71%	Charleston-Huntington-Ashland, WV-OH-KY CSA
Peoria, IL MSA	363,505	368,782	−1.43%	Peoria-Canton, IL CSA
Gainesville, FL MSA	359,036	339,247	+5.83%	Gainesville-Lake City, FL CSA
Lincoln, NE MSA	352,081	340,217	+3.49%	Lincoln-Beatrice, NE CSA
Clarksville, TN-KY MSA	349,001	320,535	+8.88%	
Rockford, IL MSA	337,242	338,798	−0.46%	Rockford-Freeport-Rochelle, IL CSA
Green Bay, WI MSA	336,756	328,268	+2.59%	Green Bay-Shawano, WI CSA
Boulder, CO MSA	328,560	330,758	−0.66%	Denver-Aurora-Greeley, CO CSA
Columbus, GA-AL MSA	324,830	328,883	−1.23%	Columbus-Auburn-Opelika, GA-AL CSA
South Bend-Mishawaka, IN-MI MSA	324,538	324,501	+0.01%	South Bend-Elkhart-Mishawaka, IN-MI CSA
Kennewick-Richland, WA MSA	324,334	303,622	+6.82%	Kennewick-Richland-Walla Walla, WA CSA
Roanoke, VA MSA	316,547	315,251	+0.41%	
Hagerstown-Martinsburg, MD-WV MSA	315,280	293,844	+7.30%	Washington-Baltimore-Arlington, DC-MD-VA-WV-PA CSA
Crestview-Fort Walton Beach-Destin, FL MSA	315,098	286,973	+9.80%	
Kingsport-Bristol, TN-VA MSA	314,834	307,614	+2.35%	Johnson City-Kingsport-Bristol, TN-VA CSA
Sioux Falls, SD-MN MSA	314,638	286,434	+9.85%	
Waco, TX MSA	308,807	295,782	+4.40%	
Olympia-Lacey-Tumwater, WA MSA	304,261	294,793	+3.21%	Seattle-Tacoma, WA CSA
Longview, TX MSA	297,315	286,184	+3.89%	
Merced, CA MSA	297,260	281,202	+5.71%	San Jose-San Francisco-Oakland, CA CSA
College Station-Bryan, TX MSA	287,476	268,248	+7.17%	
Utica-Rome, NY MSA	285,611	292,264	−2.28%	
Norwich-New London-Willimantic, CT MSA	284,015	280,430	+1.28%	New Haven-Hartford-Waterbury, CT CSA
Bremerton-Silverdale-Port Orchard, WA MSA	283,374	275,611	+2.82%	Seattle-Tacoma, WA CSA
San Luis Obispo-Paso Robles, CA MSA	282,367	282,424	−0.02%	
Tuscaloosa, AL MSA	281,850	268,674	+4.90%	
Laredo, TX MSA	281,224	267,114	+5.28%	
Duluth, MN-WI MSA	281,219	280,733	+0.17%	Duluth-Grand Rapids, MN-WI CSA
Cedar Rapids, IA MSA	279,285	276,520	+1.00%	Cedar Rapids-Iowa City, IA CSA
Slidell-Mandeville-Covington, LA MSA	279,108	264,570	+5.49%	New Orleans-Metairie-Slidell, LA-MS CSA
Seaford, DE μSA	277,140	237,378	+16.75%	
Amarillo, TX MSA	276,235	268,691	+2.81%	Amarillo-Borger, TX CSA
Evansville, IN MSA	273,786	269,256	+1.68%	Evansville-Henderson, IN-KY CSA
Fargo, ND-MN MSA	269,528	249,843	+7.88%	Fargo-Wahpeton, ND-MN CSA
Lynchburg, VA MSA	269,169	261,593	+2.90%	
Daphne-Fairhope-Foley, AL MSA	267,761	231,767	+15.53%	Mobile-Daphne-Fairhope, AL CSA
Bend, OR MSA	266,376	247,493	+7.63%	
Erie, PA MSA	265,832	270,876	−1.86%	Erie-Meadville, PA CSA
Kalamazoo-Portage, MI MSA	263,795	261,670	+0.81%	Kalamazoo-Battle Creek-Portage, MI CSA
Yakima, WA MSA	259,185	256,728	+0.96%	
Santa Cruz-Watsonville, CA MSA	258,852	270,861	−4.43%	San Jose-San Francisco-Oakland, CA CSA
Prescott Valley-Prescott, AZ MSA	252,552	236,209	+6.92%	
Tyler, TX MSA	252,549	233,479	+8.17%	Tyler-Jacksonville, TX CSA
Appleton, WI MSA	249,876	243,147	+2.77%	Appleton-Oshkosh-Neenah, WI CSA
Lake Charles, LA MSA	244,655	254,652	−3.93%	Lake Charles-DeRidder, LA CSA
Binghamton, NY MSA	243,189	247,138	−1.60%	
Hilton Head Island-Bluffton-Port Royal, SC MSA	242,966	215,908	+12.53%	
Champaign-Urbana, IL MSA	239,979	236,072	+1.66%	Champaign-Urbana-Danville, IL CSA
Macon-Bibb County, GA MSA	238,553	233,802	+2.03%	Macon-Bibb County--Warner Robins, GA CSA
Bellingham, WA MSA	236,392	226,847	+4.21%	
Fort Smith, AR-OK MSA	234,140	227,213	+3.05%	
Barnstable Town, MA MSA	233,539	228,996	+1.98%	Boston-Worcester-Providence, MA-RI-NH CSA
Topeka, KS MSA	233,052	233,152	−0.04%	
Rochester, MN MSA	231,184	226,329	+2.15%	Rochester-Austin-Winona, MN CSA
Panama City-Panama City Beach, FL MSA	231,174	200,534	+15.28%	
Las Cruces, NM MSA	229,091	219,561	+4.34%	El Paso-Las Cruces, TX-NM CSA
Charlottesville, VA MSA	228,597	221,524	+3.19%	
Lafayette-West Lafayette, IN MSA	228,468	223,716	+2.12%	Lafayette-West Lafayette-Frankfort, IN CSA
Lake Havasu City-Kingman, AZ MSA	228,102	213,267	+6.96%	
Burlington-South Burlington, VT MSA	227,803	225,562	+0.99%	Burlington-South Burlington-Barre, VT CSA
Gainesville, GA MSA	226,568	203,136	+11.54%	Atlanta--Athens-Clarke County--Sandy Springs, GA-AL CSA
Lebanon-Claremont, NH-VT μSA	224,500	221,211	+1.49%	
Yuma, AZ MSA	224,449	203,881	+10.09%	
Athens-Clarke County, GA MSA	224,148	215,415	+4.05%	Atlanta--Athens-Clarke County--Sandy Springs, GA-AL CSA
Monroe, LA MSA	222,390	227,147	−2.09%	Monroe-Ruston, LA CSA
Medford, OR MSA	221,795	223,259	−0.66%	Medford-Grants Pass, OR CSA
Columbia, MO MSA	219,062	210,864	+3.89%	Columbia-Jefferson City-Moberly, MO CSA
Punta Gorda, FL MSA	217,212	186,847	+16.25%	North Port-Bradenton, FL CSA
Jacksonville, NC MSA	217,175	204,576	+6.16%	
Johnson City, TN MSA	216,416	207,285	+4.41%	Johnson City-Kingsport-Bristol, TN-VA CSA
St. George, UT MSA	213,670	180,279	+18.52%	
Lexington Park, MD MSA	211,176	206,560	+2.23%	Washington-Baltimore-Arlington, DC-MD-VA-WV-PA CSA
Hilo-Kailua, HI μSA	210,043	200,629	+4.69%	
Chico, CA MSA	209,211	211,632	−1.14%	
Joplin, MO-KS MSA	208,796	200,771	+4.00%	Joplin-Miami, MO-OK-KS CSA
Elkhart-Goshen, IN MSA	208,774	207,047	+0.83%	South Bend-Elkhart-Mishawaka, IN-MI CSA
Warner Robins, GA MSA	208,091	191,614	+8.60%	Macon-Bibb County--Warner Robins, GA CSA
Auburn-Opelika, AL MSA	208,013	193,773	+7.35%	Columbus-Auburn-Opelika, GA-AL CSA
Springfield, IL MSA	206,033	208,640	−1.25%	Springfield-Jacksonville-Lincoln, IL CSA
St. Cloud, MN MSA	205,854	199,671	+3.10%	Minneapolis-St. Paul, MN-WI CSA
Florence, SC MSA	201,392	199,964	+0.71%	
Charleston, WV MSA	200,170	210,605	−4.95%	Charleston-Huntington-Ashland, WV-OH-KY CSA
Houma-Bayou Cane-Thibodaux, LA MSA	199,668	207,137	−3.61%	
Racine-Mount Pleasant, WI MSA	198,919	197,727	+0.60%	Milwaukee-Racine-Waukesha, WI CSA
Bowling Green, KY MSA	197,180	179,639	+9.76%	Bowling Green-Glasgow-Franklin, KY CSA
Dover, DE MSA	194,786	181,851	+7.11%	Philadelphia-Reading-Camden, PA-NJ-DE-MD CSA
Billings, MT MSA	193,603	184,167	+5.12%	
Midland, TX MSA	193,139	175,220	+10.23%	Midland-Odessa-Andrews, TX CSA
Coeur d'Alene, ID MSA	191,864	171,362	+11.96%	Spokane-Spokane Valley-Coeur d'Alene, WA-ID CSA
Saginaw, MI MSA	187,688	190,124	−1.28%	Saginaw-Midland-Bay City, MI CSA
Yuba City, CA MSA	187,478	181,208	+3.46%	Sacramento-Roseville, CA CSA
Burlington, NC MSA	186,177	171,415	+8.61%	Greensboro--Winston-Salem--High Point, NC CSA
Abilene, TX MSA	185,429	176,579	+5.01%	Abilene-Sweetwater, TX CSA
Jackson, TN MSA	184,569	180,504	+2.25%	
Kingston, NY MSA	183,330	181,851	+0.81%	New York-Newark, NY-NJ-CT-PA CSA
Greenville, NC MSA	182,936	170,243	+7.46%	Greenville-Washington, NC CSA
Iowa City, IA MSA	182,711	175,419	+4.16%	Cedar Rapids-Iowa City, IA CSA
Redding, CA MSA	181,648	182,155	−0.28%	Redding-Red Bluff, CA CSA
Blacksburg-Christiansburg-Radford, VA MSA	181,616	181,854	−0.13%	
El Centro, CA MSA	181,411	179,702	+0.95%	
Muskegon-Norton Shores, MI MSA	177,901	175,824	+1.18%	Grand Rapids-Wyoming, MI CSA
Eau Claire, WI MSA	176,647	172,007	+2.70%	Eau Claire-Menomonie, WI CSA
Oshkosh-Neenah, WI MSA	174,218	171,730	+1.45%	Appleton-Oshkosh-Neenah, WI CSA
Idaho Falls, ID MSA	173,851	157,429	+10.43%	Idaho Falls-Rexburg-Blackfoot, ID CSA
Odessa, TX MSA	173,801	165,171	+5.22%	Midland-Odessa-Andrews, TX CSA
Sebastian-Vero Beach-West Vero Corridor, FL MSA	172,799	159,788	+8.14%	Miami-Port St. Lucie-Fort Lauderdale, FL CSA
Homosassa Springs, FL MSA	171,666	153,843	+11.59%	
Bloomington, IL MSA	171,419	170,954	+0.27%	Bloomington-Pontiac, IL CSA
La Crosse-Onalaska, WI-MN MSA	171,182	170,341	+0.49%	La Crosse-Onalaska-Sparta, WI-MN CSA
Pueblo, CO MSA	169,277	168,162	+0.66%	Pueblo-Cañon City, CO CSA
Terre Haute, IN MSA	169,241	168,875	+0.22%	
Waterloo-Cedar Falls, IA MSA	169,189	168,461	+0.43%	
Kenosha, WI MSA	168,448	169,151	−0.42%	Chicago-Naperville, IL-IN-WI CSA
East Stroudsburg, PA μSA	167,179	168,327	−0.68%	Allentown-Bethlehem-East Stroudsburg, PA-NJ CSA
Janesville-Beloit, WI MSA	166,472	163,687	+1.70%	Madison-Janesville-Beloit, WI CSA
Bloomington, IN MSA	165,231	161,039	+2.60%	Bloomington-Bedford, IN CSA
Amherst Town-Northampton, MA MSA	164,065	162,308	+1.08%	Springfield-Amherst Town-Northampton, MA CSA
Grand Junction, CO MSA	162,845	155,703	+4.59%	
Logan, UT-ID MSA	160,889	147,348	+9.19%	
Kahului-Wailuku, HI MSA	160,674	164,836	−2.52%	
Chambersburg, PA MSA	160,652	155,932	+3.03%	Washington-Baltimore-Arlington, DC-MD-VA-WV-PA CSA
Decatur, AL MSA	160,326	156,494	+2.45%	Huntsville-Decatur-Albertville, AL-TN CSA
Jackson, MI MSA	159,552	160,366	−0.51%	
Concord, NH μSA	158,078	153,808	+2.78%	Boston-Worcester-Providence, MA-RI-NH CSA
Hattiesburg, MS MSA	158,014	153,891	+2.68%	Hattiesburg-Laurel, MS CSA
Bangor, ME MSA	157,967	152,199	+3.79%	
Wildwood-The Villages, FL MSA	157,772	129,752	+21.60%	Orlando-Lakeland-Deltona, FL CSA
State College, PA MSA	157,393	158,172	−0.49%	State College-DuBois, PA CSA
Vineland, NJ MSA	157,148	154,152	+1.94%	Philadelphia-Reading-Camden, PA-NJ-DE-MD CSA
Traverse City, MI MSA	156,972	153,448	+2.30%	
Rapid City, SD MSA	156,934	147,392	+6.47%	Rapid City-Spearfish, SD CSA
Santa Fe, NM MSA	156,907	154,823	+1.35%	Albuquerque-Santa Fe-Los Alamos, NM CSA
Florence-Muscle Shoals, AL MSA	156,609	150,791	+3.86%	Florence-Muscle Shoals-Russellville, AL CSA
Dothan, AL MSA	156,266	151,007	+3.48%	Dothan-Enterprise-Ozark, AL CSA
Monroe, MI MSA	156,004	154,809	+0.77%	Detroit-Warren-Ann Arbor, MI CSA
Hanford-Corcoran, CA MSA	154,327	152,486	+1.21%	Fresno-Hanford-Corcoran, CA CSA
Sherman-Denison, TX MSA	153,613	135,543	+13.33%	Dallas-Fort Worth, TX-OK CSA
Valdosta, GA MSA	153,276	148,126	+3.48%	
Jefferson City, MO MSA	152,712	150,309	+1.60%	Columbia-Jefferson City-Moberly, MO CSA
Cookeville, TN μSA	152,477	141,333	+7.88%	
Niles, MI MSA	152,444	154,316	−1.21%	South Bend-Elkhart-Mishawaka, IN-MI CSA
Winchester, VA-WV MSA	152,332	142,632	+6.80%	Washington-Baltimore-Arlington, DC-MD-VA-WV-PA CSA
Anderson Creek, NC μSA	150,137	133,568	+12.40%	Raleigh-Durham-Cary, NC CSA
Corbin, KY μSA	150,040	149,863	+0.12%	Middlesborough-Corbin, KY CSA
Wichita Falls, TX MSA	149,448	148,128	+0.89%	
Rocky Mount, NC MSA	148,486	143,870	+3.21%	Rocky Mount-Wilson-Roanoke Rapids, NC CSA
Alexandria, LA MSA	147,952	152,192	−2.79%	
Dalton, GA MSA	147,819	142,837	+3.49%	Chattanooga-Cleveland-Dalton, TN-GA-AL CSA
Texarkana, TX-AR MSA	146,816	147,519	−0.48%	
Lebanon, PA MSA	146,380	143,257	+2.18%	Harrisburg-York-Lebanon, PA CSA
Ottawa, IL μSA	145,902	148,539	−1.78%	Chicago-Naperville, IL-IN-WI CSA
Sioux City, IA-NE-SD MSA	145,738	144,334	+0.97%	Sioux City-Le Mars, IA-NE-SD CSA
Albany, GA MSA	145,510	148,922	−2.29%	
Pottsville, PA μSA	145,085	143,049	+1.42%	
Flagstaff, AZ MSA	144,368	145,101	−0.51%	
Morgantown, WV MSA	141,995	140,038	+1.40%	
Hammond, LA MSA	141,346	133,157	+6.15%	Baton Rouge-Hammond, LA CSA
Harrisonburg, VA MSA	140,155	135,571	+3.38%	Harrisonburg-Staunton-Stuarts Draft, VA CSA
Bismarck, ND MSA	139,750	133,626	+4.58%	
Jonesboro, AR MSA	139,440	134,196	+3.91%	Jonesboro-Paragould, AR CSA
Wausau, WI MSA	139,432	138,013	+1.03%	Wausau-Stevens Point-Wisconsin Rapids, WI CSA
Manhattan, KS MSA	136,122	134,046	+1.55%	
Springfield, OH MSA	135,340	136,001	−0.49%	Dayton-Springfield-Kettering, OH CSA
Wheeling, WV-OH MSA	134,089	139,513	−3.89%	
Cleveland, TN MSA	134,057	126,164	+6.26%	Chattanooga-Cleveland-Dalton, TN-GA-AL CSA
Battle Creek, MI MSA	133,408	134,310	−0.67%	Kalamazoo-Battle Creek-Portage, MI CSA
Tupelo, MS μSA	133,167	132,214	+0.72%	Tupelo-Corinth, MS CSA
Mount Vernon-Anacortes, WA MSA	132,975	129,523	+2.67%	Seattle-Tacoma, WA CSA
Napa, CA MSA	132,949	138,019	−3.67%	San Jose-San Francisco-Oakland, CA CSA
Albany, OR MSA	132,843	128,610	+3.29%	Portland-Vancouver-Salem, OR-WA CSA
Salisbury, MD MSA	131,872	128,208	+2.86%	Salisbury-Ocean Pines, MD CSA
Richmond-Berea, KY μSA	131,806	122,901	+7.25%	Lexington-Fayette--Richmond--Frankfort, KY CSA
Eureka-Arcata, CA μSA	131,647	136,463	−3.53%	
Staunton-Stuarts Draft, VA MSA	129,692	125,433	+3.40%	Harrisonburg-Staunton-Stuarts Draft, VA CSA
Augusta-Waterville, ME μSA	129,067	123,642	+4.39%	
Johnstown, PA MSA	128,968	133,472	−3.37%	Johnstown-Somerset, PA CSA
Morristown, TN MSA	128,867	119,182	+8.13%	Knoxville-Morristown-Sevierville, TN CSA
Bozeman, MT MSA	128,740	118,960	+8.22%	
Missoula, MT MSA	128,698	122,457	+5.10%	
Elizabethtown, KY MSA	128,666	125,569	+2.47%	Louisville/Jefferson County--Elizabethtown, KY-IN CSA
Wenatchee-East Wenatchee, WA MSA	128,414	122,012	+5.25%	
Pittsfield, MA MSA	128,224	129,026	−0.62%	
Ames, IA MSA	128,090	125,252	+2.27%	Des Moines-West Des Moines-Ames, IA CSA
Lawton, OK MSA	127,590	126,652	+0.74%	Lawton-Duncan, OK CSA
New Bern, NC μSA	127,358	122,168	+4.25%	New Bern-Morehead City, NC CSA
Sierra Vista-Douglas, AZ MSA	126,332	125,447	+0.71%	
Mansfield, OH MSA	124,893	124,936	−0.03%	Mansfield-Ashland-Bucyrus, OH CSA
Glens Falls, NY MSA	124,373	127,039	−2.10%	Albany-Schenectady, NY CSA
Jamestown-Dunkirk, NY μSA	124,126	127,657	−2.77%	
Twin Falls, ID MSA	123,901	114,283	+8.42%	
Holland, MI μSA	123,188	120,502	+2.23%	Grand Rapids-Wyoming, MI CSA
Goldsboro, NC MSA	122,278	117,333	+4.21%	
San Angelo, TX MSA	122,065	121,516	+0.45%	
Lawrence, KS MSA	120,920	118,785	+1.80%	Kansas City-Overland Park-Kansas City, MO-KS CSA
Farmington, NM MSA	120,340	121,661	−1.09%	
Lumberton, NC μSA	119,941	116,530	+2.93%	Fayetteville-Lumberton-Pinehurst, NC CSA
Altoona, PA MSA	119,541	122,822	−2.67%	Altoona-Huntingdon, PA CSA
St. Joseph, MO-KS MSA	119,170	121,467	−1.89%	Kansas City-Overland Park-Kansas City, MO-KS CSA
Brunswick-St. Simons, GA MSA	118,524	113,495	+4.43%	
Sheboygan, WI MSA	118,047	118,034	+0.01%	
Wooster, OH μSA	116,758	116,894	−0.12%	Cleveland-Akron-Canton, OH CSA
Lewiston-Auburn, ME MSA	116,487	111,139	+4.81%	Portland-Lewiston-South Portland, ME CSA
Anniston-Oxford, AL MSA	115,834	116,441	−0.52%	
Kalispell, MT μSA	115,429	104,357	+10.61%	
Longview-Kelso, WA MSA	114,885	110,730	+3.75%	Portland-Vancouver-Salem, OR-WA CSA
Torrington, CT μSA	114,690	112,503	+1.94%	New Haven-Hartford-Waterbury, CT CSA
Owensboro, KY MSA	113,962	112,464	+1.33%	
Muncie, IN MSA	113,106	111,903	+1.08%	Indianapolis-Carmel-Muncie, IN CSA
Sandusky, OH MSA	112,777	115,986	−2.77%	Cleveland-Akron-Canton, OH CSA
Williamsport, PA MSA	112,587	114,188	−1.40%	Williamsport-Lock Haven, PA CSA
Weirton-Steubenville, WV-OH MSA	112,468	116,903	−3.79%	Pittsburgh-Weirton-Steubenville, PA-OH-WV CSA
Roseburg, OR μSA	111,951	111,201	+0.67%	
Watertown-Fort Drum, NY MSA	111,540	116,721	−4.44%	
Michigan City-La Porte, IN MSA	111,294	112,417	−1.00%	Chicago-Naperville, IL-IN-WI CSA
Sebring, FL MSA	111,122	101,235	+9.77%	
Pinehurst-Southern Pines, NC MSA	110,619	99,727	+10.92%	Fayetteville-Lumberton-Pinehurst, NC CSA
Show Low, AZ μSA	109,946	106,717	+3.03%	
Beckley, WV MSA	109,940	115,079	−4.47%	
Hermitage, PA μSA	107,860	110,652	−2.52%	Pittsburgh-Weirton-Steubenville, PA-OH-WV CSA
Sunbury, PA μSA	107,788	109,783	−1.82%	Bloomsburg-Berwick-Sunbury, PA CSA
Gettysburg, PA MSA	107,594	103,852	+3.60%	Harrisburg-York-Lebanon, PA CSA
LaGrange, GA-AL μSA	107,097	104,198	+2.78%	Atlanta--Athens-Clarke County--Sandy Springs, GA-AL CSA
Whitewater-Elkhorn, WI μSA	106,127	106,478	−0.33%	Milwaukee-Racine-Waukesha, WI CSA
Moses Lake, WA μSA	105,727	99,123	+6.66%	Moses Lake-Othello, WA CSA
Kankakee, IL MSA	105,525	107,502	−1.84%	Chicago-Naperville, IL-IN-WI CSA
Massena-Ogdensburg, NY μSA	105,488	108,505	−2.78%	
Sumter, SC MSA	105,067	105,556	−0.46%	Columbia-Sumter-Orangeburg, SC CSA
Grand Forks, ND-MN MSA	105,046	104,362	+0.66%	
Mankato, MN MSA	104,907	103,566	+1.29%	Mankato-New Ulm, MN CSA
Fond du Lac, WI MSA	104,669	104,154	+0.49%	
Ithaca, NY MSA	104,047	105,740	−1.60%	Ithaca-Cortland, NY CSA
Gadsden, AL MSA	103,886	103,436	+0.44%	
Albertville, AL μSA	103,537	97,612	+6.07%	Huntsville-Decatur-Albertville, AL-TN CSA
Shelby-Kings Mountain, NC μSA	103,325	99,519	+3.82%	Charlotte-Concord, NC-SC CSA
Cheyenne, WY MSA	102,938	100,512	+2.41%	
Paducah, KY-IL MSA	102,259	103,486	−1.19%	Paducah-Mayfield, KY-IL CSA
Bay City, MI MSA	102,123	103,856	−1.67%	Saginaw-Midland-Bay City, MI CSA
Truckee-Grass Valley, CA μSA	101,911	102,241	−0.32%	Sacramento-Roseville, CA CSA
Rome, GA MSA	101,378	98,584	+2.83%	Atlanta--Athens-Clarke County--Sandy Springs, GA-AL CSA
Sevierville, TN μSA	101,342	98,380	+3.01%	Knoxville-Morristown-Sevierville, TN CSA
Danville, VA μSA	101,137	103,091	−1.90%	
Lima, OH MSA	100,881	102,206	−1.30%	Lima-Van Wert-Celina, OH CSA
Brainerd, MN μSA	100,562	96,189	+4.55%	
Victoria, TX MSA	99,864	98,331	+1.56%	Victoria-Port Lavaca, TX CSA
Hot Springs, AR MSA	99,695	100,180	−0.48%	Hot Springs-Malvern, AR CSA
Dubuque, IA MSA	99,381	99,266	+0.12%	
Salem, OH μSA	99,377	101,877	−2.45%	Youngstown-Warren-Salem, OH CSA
Decatur, IL MSA	99,300	103,998	−4.52%	
Jefferson, GA μSA	99,265	75,907	+30.77%	Atlanta--Athens-Clarke County--Sandy Springs, GA-AL CSA
Cape Girardeau, MO-IL MSA	99,215	97,517	+1.74%	Cape Girardeau-Sikeston, MO-IL CSA
Putnam, CT μSA	98,096	95,348	+2.88%	New Haven-Hartford-Waterbury, CT CSA
Statesboro, GA μSA	97,977	91,873	+6.64%	Savannah-Hinesville-Statesboro, GA CSA
Adrian, MI μSA	97,779	99,423	−1.65%	Detroit-Warren-Ann Arbor, MI CSA
Corvallis, OR MSA	97,728	95,184	+2.67%	Portland-Vancouver-Salem, OR-WA CSA
Helena, MT MSA	97,153	89,832	+8.15%	
Bluefield, WV-VA μSA	96,138	100,093	−3.95%	
Greenwood, SC μSA	95,215	93,646	+1.68%	Greenville-Spartanburg-Anderson, SC CSA
Cullman, AL μSA	94,009	87,866	+6.99%	Birmingham-Cullman-Talladega, AL CSA
Fairbanks-College, AK MSA	93,972	95,655	−1.76%	
Hermiston-Pendleton, OR μSA	93,721	92,261	+1.58%	
Cumberland, MD-WV μSA	93,640	95,044	−1.48%	
New Philadelphia-Dover, OH μSA	92,373	93,263	−0.95%	Cleveland-Akron-Canton, OH CSA
Hinesville, GA MSA	91,870	81,424	+12.83%	Savannah-Hinesville-Statesboro, GA CSA
Corning, NY μSA	91,855	93,584	−1.85%	Elmira-Corning, NY CSA
Talladega-Sylacauga, AL μSA	91,764	92,536	−0.83%	Birmingham-Cullman-Talladega, AL CSA
Pocatello, ID MSA	91,591	87,018	+5.26%	
Pikeville, KY μSA	89,122	94,611	−5.80%	
Beaver Dam, WI μSA	89,097	89,396	−0.33%	Milwaukee-Racine-Waukesha, WI CSA
Athens, TX μSA	88,595	82,150	+7.85%	Dallas-Fort Worth, TX-OK CSA
Lufkin, TX μSA	88,154	86,395	+2.04%	
Clarksburg, WV μSA	88,142	90,434	−2.53%	Fairmont-Clarksburg, WV CSA
Ukiah, CA μSA	88,122	91,601	−3.80%	
Centralia, WA μSA	88,062	82,149	+7.20%	Seattle-Tacoma, WA CSA
Grants Pass, OR MSA	87,867	88,090	−0.25%	Medford-Grants Pass, OR CSA
Parkersburg-Vienna, WV MSA	87,264	89,490	−2.49%	Parkersburg-Marietta-Vienna, WV-OH CSA
Zanesville, OH μSA	87,014	86,410	+0.70%	Columbus-Marion-Zanesville, OH CSA
Watertown-Fort Atkinson, WI μSA	86,505	84,900	+1.89%	Milwaukee-Racine-Waukesha, WI CSA
Columbus, IN MSA	85,729	82,208	+4.28%	Indianapolis-Carmel-Muncie, IN CSA
Oak Harbor, WA μSA	85,657	86,857	−1.38%	Seattle-Tacoma, WA CSA
Meridian, MS μSA	85,419	88,599	−3.59%	
Great Falls, MT MSA	85,029	84,414	+0.73%	
Russellville, AR μSA	84,932	83,644	+1.54%	
Kokomo, IN MSA	83,904	83,658	+0.29%	Indianapolis-Carmel-Muncie, IN CSA
Stillwater, OK μSA	83,889	81,646	+2.75%	
Huntsville, TX μSA	83,842	76,400	+9.74%	Houston-Pasadena, TX CSA
Seneca, SC μSA	83,775	78,607	+6.57%	Greenville-Spartanburg-Anderson, SC CSA
Midland, MI MSA	83,754	83,494	+0.31%	Saginaw-Midland-Bay City, MI CSA
Orangeburg, SC μSA	83,177	84,223	−1.24%	Columbia-Sumter-Orangeburg, SC CSA
Indiana, PA μSA	82,878	83,246	−0.44%	Pittsburgh-Weirton-Steubenville, PA-OH-WV CSA
Laurel, MS μSA	82,281	83,613	−1.59%	Hattiesburg-Laurel, MS CSA
Meadville, PA μSA	81,792	83,938	−2.56%	Erie-Meadville, PA CSA
Manitowoc, WI μSA	81,710	81,359	+0.43%	
Heber, UT μSA	81,655	77,145	+5.85%	Salt Lake City-Provo-Orem, UT-ID CSA
Wilson, NC μSA	81,150	78,784	+3.00%	Rocky Mount-Wilson-Roanoke Rapids, NC CSA
Warsaw, IN μSA	80,892	80,240	+0.81%	South Bend-Elkhart-Mishawaka, IN-MI CSA
Opelousas, LA μSA	80,765	82,540	−2.15%	Lafayette-New Iberia-Opelousas, LA CSA
Monticello, NY μSA	80,586	78,624	+2.50%	New York-Newark, NY-NJ-CT-PA CSA
Casper, WY MSA	80,526	79,955	+0.71%	
Elmira, NY MSA	80,415	84,148	−4.44%	Elmira-Corning, NY CSA
Key West-Key Largo, FL μSA	80,406	82,874	−2.98%	Miami-Port St. Lucie-Fort Lauderdale, FL CSA
Rifle, CO μSA	80,099	79,043	+1.34%	Edwards-Rifle, CO CSA
Searcy, AR μSA	80,085	76,822	+4.25%	Little Rock-North Little Rock, AR CSA
Keene, NH μSA	78,269	76,458	+2.37%	Keene-Brattleboro, NH-VT CSA
Port Angeles, WA μSA	78,202	77,155	+1.36%	
Aberdeen, WA μSA	78,144	75,636	+3.32%	
Plattsburgh, NY μSA	78,138	79,843	−2.14%	
DuBois, PA μSA	78,100	80,562	−3.06%	State College-DuBois, PA CSA
Grand Island, NE MSA	78,076	77,038	+1.35%	
Frankfort, KY μSA	77,874	75,393	+3.29%	Lexington-Fayette--Richmond--Frankfort, KY CSA
Palatka, FL μSA	77,734	73,321	+6.02%	Jacksonville-Kingsland-Palatka, FL-GA CSA
Chillicothe, OH μSA	76,429	77,093	−0.86%	Columbus-Marion-Zanesville, OH CSA
Minot, ND MSA	75,694	77,546	−2.39%	
Olean, NY μSA	75,390	77,042	−2.14%	Buffalo-Cheektowaga-Olean, NY CSA
Shawnee, OK μSA	75,102	72,454	+3.65%	Oklahoma City-Shawnee, OK CSA
Findlay, OH μSA	75,034	74,920	+0.15%	Findlay-Tiffin, OH CSA
Hobbs, NM μSA	74,749	74,455	+0.39%	
Auburn, NY μSA	74,365	76,248	−2.47%	Syracuse-Auburn, NY CSA
Quincy, IL-MO μSA	74,146	75,769	−2.14%	Quincy-Hannibal, IL-MO CSA
Lake City, FL μSA	74,094	69,698	+6.31%	Gainesville-Lake City, FL CSA
Fort Payne, AL μSA	74,085	71,608	+3.46%	Huntsville-Decatur-Albertville, AL-TN CSA
Wisconsin Rapids-Marshfield, WI μSA	74,060	74,207	−0.20%	Wausau-Stevens Point-Wisconsin Rapids, WI CSA
Greeneville, TN μSA	73,831	70,152	+5.24%	Johnson City-Kingsport-Bristol, TN-VA CSA
Kapaa, HI μSA	73,400	73,298	+0.14%	
Thomasville, GA μSA	72,958	72,034	+1.28%	
Mount Airy, NC μSA	72,287	71,359	+1.30%	Greensboro--Winston-Salem--High Point, NC CSA
Somerset, PA μSA	72,004	74,129	−2.87%	Johnstown-Somerset, PA CSA
Oxford, MS μSA	71,972	68,294	+5.39%	
Stevens Point-Plover, WI μSA	71,943	70,377	+2.23%	Wausau-Stevens Point-Wisconsin Rapids, WI CSA
Athens, TN μSA	71,590	66,034	+8.41%	Chattanooga-Cleveland-Dalton, TN-GA-AL CSA
Portsmouth, OH μSA	71,365	74,008	−3.57%	Charleston-Huntington-Ashland, WV-OH-KY CSA
Danville, IL μSA	71,259	74,188	−3.95%	Champaign-Urbana-Danville, IL CSA
Shelton, WA μSA	71,165	65,726	+8.28%	Seattle-Tacoma, WA CSA
Greenfield, MA μSA	70,698	71,029	−0.47%	Springfield-Amherst Town-Northampton, MA CSA
Granbury, TX μSA	70,501	61,598	+14.45%	Dallas-Fort Worth, TX-OK CSA
Morehead City, NC μSA	70,469	67,686	+4.11%	New Bern-Morehead City, NC CSA
Brigham City, UT-ID μSA	70,405	62,230	+13.14%	Salt Lake City-Provo-Orem, UT-ID CSA
Alamogordo, NM μSA	70,368	67,839	+3.73%	
Klamath Falls, OR μSA	70,274	69,413	+1.24%	
Sanford, NC μSA	70,258	63,285	+11.02%	Raleigh-Durham-Cary, NC CSA
Pine Bluff, AR μSA	70,211	74,810	−6.15%	Little Rock-North Little Rock, AR CSA
Faribault-Northfield, MN μSA	69,939	67,097	+4.24%	Minneapolis-St. Paul, MN-WI CSA
Rexburg, ID μSA	69,380	66,301	+4.64%	Idaho Falls-Rexburg-Blackfoot, ID CSA
Tullahoma-Manchester, TN μSA	69,339	64,350	+7.75%	Nashville-Davidson--Murfreesboro, TN CSA
Albemarle, NC μSA	68,830	62,504	+10.12%	Charlotte-Concord, NC-SC CSA
Gallup, NM μSA	68,119	72,902	−6.56%	
Marquette, MI μSA	68,064	66,017	+3.10%	
Farmington, MO μSA	67,809	66,922	+1.33%	St. Louis-St. Charles-Farmington, MO-IL CSA
Clearlake, CA μSA	67,772	68,163	−0.57%	
Owosso, MI μSA	67,681	68,094	−0.61%	Lansing-East Lansing-Owosso, MI CSA
Somerset, KY μSA	67,384	65,034	+3.61%	
Marion-Herrin, IL μSA	67,225	67,153	+0.11%	Carbondale-Marion-Herrin, IL CSA
Columbus, MS μSA	67,144	69,164	−2.92%	Starkville-Columbus, MS CSA
Cedar City, UT μSA	67,141	57,289	+17.20%	
New Iberia, LA μSA	66,846	69,929	−4.41%	Lafayette-New Iberia-Opelousas, LA CSA
Muskogee, OK μSA	66,708	66,339	+0.56%	Tulsa-Bartlesville-Muskogee, OK CSA
Baraboo, WI μSA	66,652	65,763	+1.35%	Madison-Janesville-Beloit, WI CSA
Marion, IN μSA	66,524	66,674	−0.22%	
Rio Grande City-Roma, TX μSA	66,319	65,920	+0.61%	McAllen-Edinburg, TX CSA
Crossville, TN μSA	66,300	61,145	+8.43%	
North Wilkesboro, NC μSA	66,233	65,969	+0.40%	
Bloomsburg-Berwick, PA μSA	66,193	64,727	+2.26%	Bloomsburg-Berwick-Sunbury, PA CSA
Richmond, IN μSA	66,169	66,553	−0.58%	Richmond-Connersville, IN CSA
Nacogdoches, TX μSA	66,035	64,653	+2.14%	
Murrells Inlet, SC μSA	65,912	63,404	+3.96%	Myrtle Beach-Conway, SC CSA
Forest City, NC μSA	65,745	64,444	+2.02%	
Marinette, WI-MI μSA	65,515	65,374	+0.22%	Marinette-Iron Mountain, WI-MI CSA
Lewiston, ID-WA MSA	65,450	64,375	+1.67%	
Clovis, NM μSA	65,270	67,621	−3.48%	
Laconia, NH μSA	65,147	63,705	+2.26%	Boston-Worcester-Providence, MA-RI-NH CSA
Marion, OH μSA	65,115	65,359	−0.37%	Columbus-Marion-Zanesville, OH CSA
Mount Pleasant, MI μSA	64,691	64,394	+0.46%	Mount Pleasant-Alma, MI CSA
Red Bluff, CA μSA	64,665	65,829	−1.77%	Redding-Red Bluff, CA CSA
Mount Vernon, OH μSA	64,002	62,721	+2.04%	Columbus-Marion-Zanesville, OH CSA
Coos Bay-North Bend, OR μSA	63,992	64,929	−1.44%	
Waynesville, NC μSA	63,369	62,089	+2.06%	Asheville-Waynesville-Brevard, NC CSA
Roswell, NM μSA	63,364	65,157	−2.75%	
Paris, TX μSA	63,319	61,675	+2.67%	
Athens, OH μSA	63,197	62,431	+1.23%	Columbus-Marion-Zanesville, OH CSA
Martinsville, VA μSA	63,091	64,433	−2.08%	
Roanoke Rapids, NC μSA	63,025	66,093	−4.64%	Rocky Mount-Wilson-Roanoke Rapids, NC CSA
Hemlock Farms, PA μSA	62,808	58,535	+7.30%	New York-Newark, NY-NJ-CT-PA CSA
Carlsbad-Artesia, NM μSA	62,509	62,314	+0.31%	
Walla Walla, WA MSA	62,361	62,584	−0.36%	Kennewick-Richland-Walla Walla, WA CSA
Starkville, MS μSA	62,063	61,714	+0.57%	Starkville-Columbus, MS CSA
Enid, OK MSA	61,779	62,846	−1.70%	
Calhoun, GA μSA	61,701	57,544	+7.22%	Atlanta--Athens-Clarke County--Sandy Springs, GA-AL CSA
Clewiston, FL μSA	61,546	51,745	+18.94%	Cape Coral-Fort Myers-Naples, FL CSA
Hutchinson, KS μSA	61,539	61,898	−0.58%	
Fergus Falls, MN μSA	61,041	60,081	+1.60%	
Sturgis, MI μSA	60,968	60,939	+0.05%	Kalamazoo-Battle Creek-Portage, MI CSA
Oneonta, NY μSA	60,589	58,524	+3.53%	
Dublin, GA μSA	60,351	58,759	+2.71%	
Hudson, NY μSA	60,168	61,570	−2.28%	Albany-Schenectady, NY CSA
Kingsland, GA μSA	60,143	54,768	+9.81%	Jacksonville-Kingsland-Palatka, FL-GA CSA
Ontario, OR-ID μSA	60,085	56,957	+5.49%	Boise City-Mountain Home-Ontario, ID-OR CSA
Palestine, TX μSA	59,805	57,922	+3.25%	
Rutland, VT μSA	59,653	60,572	−1.52%	
Barre, VT μSA	59,652	59,807	−0.26%	Burlington-South Burlington-Barre, VT CSA
Sayre, PA μSA	59,600	59,967	−0.61%	
Picayune, MS μSA	59,363	56,145	+5.73%	New Orleans-Metairie-Slidell, LA-MS CSA
Salina, KS μSA	59,121	60,038	−1.53%	
Eagle Pass, TX MSA	58,823	57,887	+1.62%	
Fremont, OH μSA	58,655	58,896	−0.41%	Cleveland-Akron-Canton, OH CSA
Carson City, NV MSA	58,571	58,639	−0.12%	Reno-Carson City-Gardnerville Ranchos, NV-CA CSA
Batavia, NY μSA	58,416	58,388	+0.05%	Rochester-Batavia-Seneca Falls, NY CSA
Marietta, OH μSA	58,389	59,771	−2.31%	Parkersburg-Marietta-Vienna, WV-OH CSA
Gaffney, SC μSA	58,275	56,216	+3.66%	Greenville-Spartanburg-Anderson, SC CSA
Norwalk, OH μSA	58,250	58,565	−0.54%	Cleveland-Akron-Canton, OH CSA
Kearney, NE μSA	57,962	56,772	+2.10%	
Waycross, GA μSA	57,670	55,967	+3.04%	
Pahrump, NV μSA	57,336	51,591	+11.14%	Las Vegas-Henderson, NV CSA
Henderson, KY μSA	57,184	57,810	−1.08%	Evansville-Henderson, IN-KY CSA
Corsicana, TX μSA	57,181	52,624	+8.66%	Dallas-Fort Worth, TX-OK CSA
Mount Pleasant, TX μSA	57,076	55,684	+2.50%	
Branson, MO μSA	57,001	56,066	+1.67%	
Danville, KY μSA	56,985	54,889	+3.82%	
Enterprise, AL μSA	56,953	53,465	+6.52%	Dothan-Enterprise-Ozark, AL CSA
Durango, CO μSA	56,898	55,638	+2.26%	
Elko, NV μSA	56,682	55,557	+2.02%	
Warrensburg, MO μSA	56,670	54,013	+4.92%	Kansas City-Overland Park-Kansas City, MO-KS CSA
Glasgow, KY μSA	56,224	54,771	+2.65%	Bowling Green-Glasgow-Franklin, KY CSA
Kinston, NC μSA	55,837	55,122	+1.30%	
Fairmont, WV μSA	55,584	56,205	−1.10%	Fairmont-Clarksburg, WV CSA
Shelbyville, TN μSA	55,273	50,237	+10.02%	Nashville-Davidson--Murfreesboro, TN CSA
Boone, NC μSA	54,786	54,086	+1.29%	
Natchez, MS-LA μSA	54,722	55,485	−1.38%	
Tiffin, OH μSA	54,522	55,069	−0.99%	Findlay-Tiffin, OH CSA
Ocean Pines, MD μSA	54,459	52,460	+3.81%	Salisbury-Ocean Pines, MD CSA
Fort Leonard Wood, MO μSA	54,442	53,955	+0.90%	
Sandpoint, ID μSA	54,420	47,110	+15.52%	
Edwards, CO μSA	54,291	55,731	−2.58%	Edwards-Rifle, CO CSA
Scottsboro, AL μSA	54,281	52,579	+3.24%	Chattanooga-Cleveland-Dalton, TN-GA-AL CSA
Sterling, IL μSA	54,121	55,691	−2.82%	Dixon-Sterling, IL CSA
Kerrville, TX μSA	54,037	52,598	+2.74%	San Antonio-New Braunfels-Kerrville, TX CSA
Bartlesville, OK μSA	54,037	52,455	+3.02%	Tulsa-Bartlesville-Muskogee, OK CSA
Payson, AZ μSA	53,801	53,272	+0.99%	Phoenix-Mesa, AZ CSA
Jacksonville, TX μSA	53,337	50,412	+5.80%	Tyler-Jacksonville, TX CSA
Sonora, CA μSA	53,160	55,620	−4.42%	
Douglas, GA μSA	52,861	51,378	+2.89%	
McComb, MS μSA	52,640	54,208	−2.89%	
Ashland, OH μSA	52,523	52,447	+0.14%	Mansfield-Ashland-Bucyrus, OH CSA
Carbondale, IL μSA	52,501	52,974	−0.89%	Carbondale-Marion-Herrin, IL CSA
Platteville, WI μSA	52,446	51,938	+0.98%	
Gloversville, NY μSA	52,216	53,324	−2.08%	Albany-Schenectady, NY CSA
Greenville, OH μSA	51,520	51,881	−0.70%	Dayton-Springfield-Kettering, OH CSA
Rochelle, IL μSA	51,399	51,788	−0.75%	Rockford-Freeport-Rochelle, IL CSA
Durant, OK μSA	51,367	46,067	+11.50%	Dallas-Fort Worth, TX-OK CSA
Tifton, GA μSA	51,237	50,350	+1.76%	
Gardnerville Ranchos, NV-CA μSA	51,154	50,692	+0.91%	Reno-Carson City-Gardnerville Ranchos, NV-CA CSA
Blackfoot, ID μSA	51,153	47,992	+6.59%	Idaho Falls-Rexburg-Blackfoot, ID CSA
Newport, OR μSA	50,636	50,395	+0.48%	
Winona, MN μSA	50,523	49,671	+1.72%	Rochester-Austin-Winona, MN CSA
Cornelia, GA μSA	50,416	46,031	+9.53%	Atlanta--Athens-Clarke County--Sandy Springs, GA-AL CSA
Amsterdam, NY μSA	50,046	49,532	+1.04%	Albany-Schenectady, NY CSA
Cañon City, CO μSA	50,039	48,939	+2.25%	Pueblo-Cañon City, CO CSA
Nogales, AZ μSA	50,020	47,669	+4.93%	Tucson-Nogales, AZ CSA
Sikeston, MO μSA	49,978	50,636	−1.30%	Cape Girardeau-Sikeston, MO-IL CSA
Ozark, AL μSA	49,912	49,326	+1.19%	Dothan-Enterprise-Ozark, AL CSA
Cadillac, MI μSA	49,719	48,725	+2.04%	
Mason City, IA μSA	49,710	50,570	−1.70%	
Oil City, PA μSA	49,346	50,454	−2.20%	
Burley, ID μSA	49,308	46,268	+6.57%	
Norfolk, NE μSA	49,228	48,744	+0.99%	
Tahlequah, OK μSA	49,196	47,078	+4.50%	
New Castle, IN μSA	49,137	48,914	+0.46%	Indianapolis-Carmel-Muncie, IN CSA
Ardmore, OK μSA	48,910	48,003	+1.89%	
Ellensburg, WA μSA	48,803	44,337	+10.07%	
Pullman, WA μSA	48,512	47,973	+1.12%	Pullman-Moscow, WA-ID CSA
Mount Sterling, KY μSA	48,428	46,977	+3.09%	Lexington-Fayette--Richmond--Frankfort, KY CSA
Ruston, LA μSA	48,360	48,396	−0.07%	Monroe-Ruston, LA CSA
Red Wing, MN μSA	48,195	47,582	+1.29%	Minneapolis-St. Paul, MN-WI CSA
Gillette, WY μSA	48,145	47,026	+2.38%	
Sidney, OH μSA	48,065	48,230	−0.34%	Dayton-Springfield-Kettering, OH CSA
Kendallville, IN μSA	47,937	47,457	+1.01%	Fort Wayne-Huntington-Auburn, IN CSA
Del Rio, TX μSA	47,835	47,586	+0.52%	
Galesburg, IL μSA	47,767	49,967	−4.40%	
Moultrie, GA μSA	47,438	45,898	+3.36%	
Paragould, AR μSA	47,411	45,736	+3.66%	Jonesboro-Paragould, AR CSA
Seymour, IN μSA	47,370	46,428	+2.03%	Indianapolis-Carmel-Muncie, IN CSA
Bemidji, MN μSA	47,055	46,228	+1.79%	
Lawrenceburg, TN μSA	46,914	44,159	+6.24%	Nashville-Davidson--Murfreesboro, TN CSA
Charleston-Mattoon, IL μSA	46,607	46,863	−0.55%	
Plymouth, IN μSA	46,599	46,095	+1.09%	South Bend-Elkhart-Mishawaka, IN-MI CSA
Columbus, NE μSA	46,583	44,878	+3.80%	
Sparta, WI μSA	46,572	46,274	+0.64%	La Crosse-Onalaska-Sparta, WI-MN CSA
Morgan City, LA μSA	46,552	49,406	−5.78%	
Rice Lake, WI μSA	46,484	46,711	−0.49%	
Bellefontaine, OH μSA	46,302	46,150	+0.33%	Columbus-Marion-Zanesville, OH CSA
Menomonie, WI μSA	46,223	45,440	+1.72%	Eau Claire-Menomonie, WI CSA
Lewistown, PA μSA	46,127	46,143	−0.03%	
Clinton, IA μSA	46,002	46,460	−0.99%	Davenport-Moline, IA-IL CSA
Coldwater, MI μSA	45,993	44,862	+2.52%	
Wapakoneta, OH μSA	45,909	46,422	−1.11%	Lima-Van Wert-Celina, OH CSA
Cortland, NY μSA	45,850	46,809	−2.05%	Ithaca-Cortland, NY CSA
Shawano, WI μSA	45,759	45,136	+1.38%	Green Bay-Shawano, WI CSA
Hillsdale, MI μSA	45,738	45,746	−0.02%	
Harrison, AR μSA	45,654	44,598	+2.37%	
Winchester, TN μSA	45,579	42,774	+6.56%	Nashville-Davidson--Murfreesboro, TN CSA
Bedford, IN μSA	45,568	45,011	+1.24%	Bloomington-Bedford, IN CSA
Cedartown, GA μSA	45,514	42,853	+6.21%	Atlanta--Athens-Clarke County--Sandy Springs, GA-AL CSA
Grand Rapids, MN μSA	45,404	45,014	+0.87%	Duluth-Grand Rapids, MN-WI CSA
Alice, TX μSA	45,383	45,967	−1.27%	Corpus Christi-Kingsville-Alice, TX CSA
Rolla, MO μSA	45,247	44,638	+1.36%	
Brattleboro, VT μSA	45,204	45,905	−1.53%	Keene-Brattleboro, NH-VT CSA
Marion, NC μSA	45,198	44,578	+1.39%	Charlotte-Concord, NC-SC CSA
Madisonville, KY μSA	45,127	45,423	−0.65%	
Bogalusa, LA μSA	44,937	45,463	−1.16%	New Orleans-Metairie-Slidell, LA-MS CSA
Effingham, IL μSA	44,727	45,118	−0.87%	
Willmar, MN μSA	44,720	43,732	+2.26%	
Washington, NC μSA	44,670	44,652	+0.04%	Greenville-Washington, NC CSA
Montrose, CO μSA	44,591	42,679	+4.48%	
Auburn, IN μSA	44,535	43,265	+2.94%	Fort Wayne-Huntington-Auburn, IN CSA
Gainesville, TX μSA	44,461	41,668	+6.70%	Dallas-Fort Worth, TX-OK CSA
Duncan, OK μSA	44,310	42,848	+3.41%	Lawton-Duncan, OK CSA
Sedalia, MO μSA	44,254	42,980	+2.96%	
Burlington, IA-IL μSA	44,061	45,297	−2.73%	Burlington-Fort Madison, IA-IL CSA
Milledgeville, GA μSA	44,029	43,799	+0.53%	
Jasper, IN μSA	44,016	43,637	+0.87%	
Stephenville, TX μSA	43,911	42,545	+3.21%	
McMinnville, TN μSA	43,717	40,953	+6.75%	
Ponca City, OK μSA	43,490	43,700	−0.48%	
McAlester, OK μSA	43,320	43,773	−1.03%	
Freeport, IL μSA	43,220	44,630	−3.16%	Rockford-Freeport-Rochelle, IL CSA
Huntingdon, PA μSA	43,001	44,092	−2.47%	Altoona-Huntingdon, PA CSA
Mountain Home, AR μSA	42,982	41,627	+3.26%	
Celina, OH μSA	42,737	42,528	+0.49%	Lima-Van Wert-Celina, OH CSA
Henderson, NC μSA	42,638	42,578	+0.14%	Raleigh-Durham-Cary, NC CSA
Okeechobee, FL μSA	42,608	39,644	+7.48%	Miami-Port St. Lucie-Fort Lauderdale, FL CSA
Big Rapids, MI μSA	42,320	39,714	+6.56%	Grand Rapids-Wyoming, MI CSA
Lewisburg, PA μSA	42,313	42,681	−0.86%	Bloomsburg-Berwick-Sunbury, PA CSA
Wilmington, OH μSA	42,301	42,018	+0.67%	Cincinnati-Wilmington, OH-KY-IN CSA
Elizabeth City, NC μSA	42,201	40,568	+4.03%	Virginia Beach-Chesapeake, VA-NC CSA
El Campo, TX μSA	42,060	41,570	+1.18%	Houston-Pasadena, TX CSA
Rockingham, NC μSA	42,041	42,946	−2.11%	Fayetteville-Lumberton-Pinehurst, NC CSA
Poplar Bluff, MO μSA	41,904	42,130	−0.54%	
Bucyrus, OH μSA	41,896	42,025	−0.31%	Mansfield-Ashland-Bucyrus, OH CSA
Muscatine, IA μSA	41,853	43,235	−3.20%	Davenport-Moline, IA-IL CSA
Moscow, ID μSA	41,842	39,517	+5.88%	Pullman-Moscow, WA-ID CSA
Williston, ND μSA	41,767	40,950	+2.00%	
Vicksburg, MS μSA	41,759	44,722	−6.63%	Jackson-Vicksburg-Brookhaven, MS CSA
Aberdeen, SD μSA	41,583	42,287	−1.66%	
Rock Springs, WY μSA	41,267	42,272	−2.38%	
Alma, MI μSA	41,190	41,761	−1.37%	Mount Pleasant-Alma, MI CSA
Austin, MN μSA	40,971	40,029	+2.35%	Rochester-Austin-Winona, MN CSA
Alexander City, AL μSA	40,953	41,311	−0.87%	Columbus-Auburn-Opelika, GA-AL CSA
Astoria, OR μSA	40,926	41,072	−0.36%	
West Plains, MO μSA	40,798	39,750	+2.64%	
Hastings, NE μSA	40,577	40,704	−0.31%	
Greenville, MS μSA	40,446	44,922	−9.96%	
Safford, AZ μSA	40,157	38,533	+4.21%	
Alexandria, MN μSA	40,120	39,006	+2.86%	
Lake of the Woods, VA μSA	40,083	36,254	+10.56%	Washington-Baltimore-Arlington, DC-MD-VA-WV-PA CSA
Houghton, MI μSA	40,028	39,407	+1.58%	
Marshalltown, IA μSA	39,890	40,105	−0.54%	
Española, NM μSA	39,832	40,363	−1.32%	Albuquerque-Santa Fe-Los Alamos, NM CSA
Selinsgrove, PA μSA	39,655	39,736	−0.20%	Bloomsburg-Berwick-Sunbury, PA CSA
Newberry, SC μSA	39,561	37,719	+4.88%	Columbia-Sumter-Orangeburg, SC CSA
Riverton, WY μSA	39,464	39,234	+0.59%	
Murray, KY μSA	39,421	37,103	+6.25%	
Bonham, TX μSA	39,265	35,662	+10.10%	Dallas-Fort Worth, TX-OK CSA
Dickinson, ND μSA	39,142	38,686	+1.18%	
Breckenridge, CO μSA	39,069	38,491	+1.50%	
Sulphur Springs, TX μSA	39,063	36,787	+6.19%	Dallas-Fort Worth, TX-OK CSA
Weatherford, OK μSA	39,059	39,437	−0.96%	Weatherford-Elk City, OK CSA
Pittsburg, KS μSA	39,008	38,972	+0.09%	
Bradford, PA μSA	38,984	40,432	−3.58%	
Hannibal, MO μSA	38,969	38,880	+0.23%	Quincy-Hannibal, IL-MO CSA
Crawfordsville, IN μSA	38,954	37,936	+2.68%	Indianapolis-Carmel-Muncie, IN CSA
Urbana, OH μSA	38,820	38,714	+0.27%	Dayton-Springfield-Kettering, OH CSA
Batesville, AR μSA	38,785	37,938	+2.23%	
Brownwood, TX μSA	38,711	38,095	+1.62%	
Laramie, WY μSA	38,558	37,066	+4.03%	
Ada, OK μSA	38,528	38,065	+1.22%	
Steamboat Springs, CO μSA	38,451	38,121	+0.87%	
Campbellsville, KY μSA	38,407	37,130	+3.44%	
Cambridge, OH μSA	38,379	38,438	−0.15%	Columbus-Marion-Zanesville, OH CSA
Defiance, OH μSA	38,292	38,286	+0.02%	
Brenham, TX μSA	38,288	35,805	+6.93%	Houston-Pasadena, TX CSA
Vernal, UT μSA	38,278	35,620	+7.46%	
Kill Devil Hills, NC μSA	38,245	36,915	+3.60%	Virginia Beach-Chesapeake, VA-NC CSA
Easton, MD μSA	38,238	37,526	+1.90%	Washington-Baltimore-Arlington, DC-MD-VA-WV-PA CSA
Lewisburg, TN μSA	38,071	34,318	+10.94%	Nashville-Davidson--Murfreesboro, TN CSA
Fremont, NE μSA	38,057	37,167	+2.39%	Omaha-Fremont, NE-IA CSA
Newport, TN μSA	37,889	35,999	+5.25%	Knoxville-Morristown-Sevierville, TN CSA
Greencastle, IN μSA	37,876	36,726	+3.13%	Indianapolis-Carmel-Muncie, IN CSA
Lock Haven, PA μSA	37,870	37,450	+1.12%	Williamsport-Lock Haven, PA CSA
Logansport, IN μSA	37,836	37,870	−0.09%	
Blytheville, AR μSA	37,828	40,685	−7.02%	
Brookings, SD μSA	37,635	34,375	+9.48%	
Garden City, KS μSA	37,505	38,470	−2.51%	
Owatonna, MN μSA	37,464	37,406	+0.16%	Minneapolis-St. Paul, MN-WI CSA
Jacksonville, IL μSA	37,381	37,864	−1.28%	Springfield-Jacksonville-Lincoln, IL CSA
Huntington, IN μSA	37,224	36,662	+1.53%	Fort Wayne-Huntington-Auburn, IN CSA
Coshocton, OH μSA	37,188	36,612	+1.57%	Cleveland-Akron-Canton, OH CSA
Arcadia, FL μSA	37,078	33,976	+9.13%	North Port-Bradenton, FL CSA
Mayfield, KY μSA	37,050	36,649	+1.09%	Paducah-Mayfield, KY-IL CSA
Warren, PA μSA	37,038	38,587	−4.01%	
Lebanon, MO μSA	36,943	36,039	+2.51%	
El Dorado, AR μSA	36,926	39,054	−5.45%	
Fayetteville, TN μSA	36,853	35,319	+4.34%	Huntsville-Decatur-Albertville, AL-TN CSA
Fort Dodge, IA μSA	36,838	36,999	−0.44%	
Plainview, TX μSA	36,700	37,924	−3.23%	Lubbock-Plainview, TX CSA
DeRidder, LA μSA	36,673	36,549	+0.34%	Lake Charles-DeRidder, LA CSA
Decatur, IN μSA	36,650	35,809	+2.35%	Fort Wayne-Huntington-Auburn, IN CSA
Hutchinson, MN μSA	36,631	36,771	−0.38%	Minneapolis-St. Paul, MN-WI CSA
Bennington, VT μSA	36,630	37,347	−1.92%	
Jackson, WY-ID μSA	36,587	34,961	+4.65%	
Escanaba, MI μSA	36,582	36,903	−0.87%	
Bay City, TX μSA	36,463	36,255	+0.57%	Houston-Pasadena, TX CSA
Centralia, IL μSA	36,382	37,729	−3.57%	St. Louis-St. Charles-Farmington, MO-IL CSA
Dyersburg, TN μSA	36,320	36,801	−1.31%	
Scottsbluff, NE μSA	36,272	36,758	−1.32%	
Vidalia, GA μSA	36,180	35,640	+1.52%	
Mount Vernon, IL μSA	36,147	37,113	−2.60%	
Butte-Silver Bow, MT μSA	36,118	35,133	+2.80%	
Natchitoches, LA μSA	36,089	37,515	−3.80%	
Sault Ste. Marie, MI μSA	36,081	36,785	−1.91%	
Vincennes, IN μSA	35,652	36,282	−1.74%	
Detroit Lakes, MN μSA	35,497	35,183	+0.89%	
Ottumwa, IA μSA	35,210	35,437	−0.64%	
Selma, AL μSA	35,140	38,462	−8.64%	Montgomery-Selma, AL CSA
Pontiac, IL μSA	35,057	35,815	−2.12%	Bloomington-Pontiac, IL CSA
Brookhaven, MS μSA	35,012	34,907	+0.30%	Jackson-Vicksburg-Brookhaven, MS CSA
Minden, LA μSA	34,948	36,967	−5.46%	Shreveport-Bossier City-Minden, LA CSA
Greenwood, MS μSA	34,912	38,337	−8.93%	
Emporia, KS μSA	34,838	34,751	+0.25%	
Angola, IN μSA	34,799	34,435	+1.06%	Fort Wayne-Huntington-Auburn, IN CSA
Corinth, MS μSA	34,569	34,740	−0.49%	Tupelo-Corinth, MS CSA
Taos, NM μSA	34,564	34,489	+0.22%	
Peru, IN μSA	34,487	35,962	−4.10%	Indianapolis-Carmel-Muncie, IN CSA
Arkansas City-Winfield, KS μSA	34,382	34,549	−0.48%	Wichita-Arkansas City-Winfield, KS CSA
Brevard, NC μSA	34,211	32,986	+3.71%	Asheville-Waynesville-Brevard, NC CSA
Washington, IN μSA	34,209	33,381	+2.48%	
Pella, IA μSA	34,192	33,414	+2.33%	Des Moines-West Des Moines-Ames, IA CSA
Dodge City, KS μSA	33,993	34,287	−0.86%	
North Platte, NE μSA	33,972	35,392	−4.01%	
Port Townsend, WA μSA	33,970	32,977	+3.01%	
Petoskey, MI μSA	33,775	34,112	−0.99%	
Troy, AL μSA	33,688	33,009	+2.06%	
Cambridge, MD μSA	33,628	32,531	+3.37%	Washington-Baltimore-Arlington, DC-MD-VA-WV-PA CSA
Malvern, AR μSA	33,451	33,040	+1.24%	Hot Springs-Malvern, AR CSA
Taylorville, IL μSA	33,443	34,032	−1.73%	Springfield-Jacksonville-Lincoln, IL CSA
Americus, GA μSA	33,394	34,163	−2.25%	
Laurinburg, NC μSA	33,322	34,174	−2.49%	Fayetteville-Lumberton-Pinehurst, NC CSA
Frankfort, IN μSA	33,322	33,190	+0.40%	Lafayette-West Lafayette-Frankfort, IN CSA
Madison, IN μSA	33,279	33,147	+0.40%	
Martin, TN μSA	33,261	32,902	+1.09%	Union City-Martin, TN CSA
Sheridan, WY μSA	33,241	30,921	+7.50%	
Dixon, IL μSA	32,914	34,145	−3.61%	Dixon-Sterling, IL CSA
Canton, IL μSA	32,901	33,609	−2.11%	Peoria-Canton, IL CSA
Paris, TN μSA	32,896	32,199	+2.16%	
Seneca Falls, NY μSA	32,883	33,814	−2.75%	Rochester-Batavia-Seneca Falls, NY CSA
Beeville, TX μSA	32,515	31,047	+4.73%	
Jesup, GA μSA	32,481	30,144	+7.75%	Savannah-Hinesville-Statesboro, GA CSA
Russellville, AL μSA	32,449	32,113	+1.05%	Florence-Muscle Shoals-Russellville, AL CSA
Hailey, ID μSA	32,436	30,476	+6.43%	
Fort Madison, IA μSA	32,306	33,555	−3.72%	Burlington-Fort Madison, IA-IL CSA
Juneau, AK μSA	31,609	32,255	−2.00%	
Cody, WY μSA	31,171	29,624	+5.22%	
Mineral Wells, TX μSA	30,791	28,409	+8.38%	Dallas-Fort Worth, TX-OK CSA
Wabash, IN μSA	30,713	30,976	−0.85%	
Iron Mountain, MI-WI μSA	30,575	30,505	+0.23%	Marinette-Iron Mountain, WI-MI CSA
Big Spring, TX μSA	30,504	34,860	−12.50%	
Albert Lea, MN μSA	30,440	30,895	−1.47%	
Miami, OK μSA	30,438	30,285	+0.51%	Joplin-Miami, MO-OK-KS CSA
Kingsville, TX μSA	30,315	31,040	−2.34%	Corpus Christi-Kingsville-Alice, TX CSA
Las Vegas, NM μSA	30,311	31,390	−3.44%	Albuquerque-Santa Fe-Los Alamos, NM CSA
Fort Morgan, CO μSA	30,306	29,111	+4.10%	
Grenada, MS μSA	30,222	31,451	−3.91%	
Union City, TN μSA	30,067	30,787	−2.34%	Union City-Martin, TN CSA
McPherson, KS μSA	30,064	30,223	−0.53%	
St. Marys, PA μSA	29,926	30,990	−3.43%	
Kirksville, MO μSA	29,824	29,346	+1.63%	
Watertown, SD μSA	29,562	28,325	+4.37%	
Mountain Home, ID μSA	29,465	28,666	+2.79%	Boise City-Mountain Home-Ontario, ID-OR CSA
Spearfish, SD μSA	29,459	25,768	+14.32%	Rapid City-Spearfish, SD CSA
Bainbridge, GA μSA	29,432	29,367	+0.22%	Tallahassee-Bainbridge, FL-GA CSA
Hays, KS μSA	29,075	28,934	+0.49%	
Gallipolis, OH μSA	29,072	29,220	−0.51%	
Ludington, MI μSA	29,040	29,052	−0.04%	
Van Wert, OH μSA	29,013	28,931	+0.28%	Lima-Van Wert-Celina, OH CSA
Alpena, MI μSA	28,853	28,907	−0.19%	
Washington Court House, OH μSA	28,552	28,951	−1.38%	Columbus-Marion-Zanesville, OH CSA
Fredericksburg, TX μSA	28,527	26,725	+6.74%	San Antonio-New Braunfels-Kerrville, TX CSA
Thomaston, GA μSA	28,500	27,700	+2.89%	Atlanta--Athens-Clarke County--Sandy Springs, GA-AL CSA
Cleveland, MS μSA	28,262	30,985	−8.79%	
Susanville, CA μSA	28,117	32,730	−14.09%	
Alamosa, CO μSA	27,896	27,336	+2.05%	
Toccoa, GA μSA	27,854	26,784	+3.99%	
Silver City, NM μSA	27,252	28,185	−3.31%	
Lincoln, IL μSA	27,182	27,987	−2.88%	Springfield-Jacksonville-Lincoln, IL CSA
Elkins, WV μSA	26,882	27,932	−3.76%	
Eufaula, AL-GA μSA	26,861	27,458	−2.17%	
Kennett, MO μSA	26,855	28,283	−5.05%	
Greensburg, IN μSA	26,576	26,472	+0.39%	Indianapolis-Carmel-Muncie, IN CSA
Crescent City, CA μSA	26,410	27,743	−4.80%	Brookings-Crescent City, OR-CA CSA
Camden, AR μSA	26,363	27,389	−3.75%	
The Dalles, OR μSA	26,310	26,670	−1.35%	
Ottawa, KS μSA	26,299	25,996	+1.17%	Kansas City-Overland Park-Kansas City, MO-KS CSA
Lexington, NE μSA	26,255	26,004	+0.97%	
Macomb, IL μSA	25,916	27,238	−4.85%	
Mitchell, SD μSA	25,913	25,747	+0.64%	
La Grande, OR μSA	25,900	26,196	−1.13%	
Fallon, NV μSA	25,851	25,516	+1.31%	Reno-Carson City-Gardnerville Ranchos, NV-CA CSA
Le Mars, IA μSA	25,697	25,698	0.00%	Sioux City-Le Mars, IA-NE-SD CSA
Marshall, MN μSA	25,684	25,269	+1.64%	
New Ulm, MN μSA	25,517	25,912	−1.52%	Mankato-New Ulm, MN CSA
Deming, NM μSA	25,407	25,427	−0.08%	
Summerville, GA μSA	25,300	24,965	+1.34%	Chattanooga-Cleveland-Dalton, TN-GA-AL CSA
Monticello, IN μSA	25,164	24,688	+1.93%	Lafayette-West Lafayette-Frankfort, IN CSA
Uvalde, TX μSA	24,963	24,564	+1.62%	
Great Bend, KS μSA	24,790	25,493	−2.76%	
Altus, OK μSA	24,764	24,785	−0.08%	
Mexico, MO μSA	24,528	24,962	−1.74%	Columbia-Jefferson City-Moberly, MO CSA
Moberly, MO μSA	24,513	24,716	−0.82%	Columbia-Jefferson City-Moberly, MO CSA
Hood River, OR μSA	23,720	23,977	−1.07%	
Yankton, SD μSA	23,635	23,310	+1.39%	
Connersville, IN μSA	23,533	23,398	+0.58%	Richmond-Connersville, IN CSA
Evanston, WY-UT μSA	23,415	22,960	+1.98%	
Marshall, MO μSA	23,265	23,333	−0.29%	
Wahpeton, ND-MN μSA	23,019	23,035	−0.07%	Fargo-Wahpeton, ND-MN CSA
Middlesborough, KY μSA	22,829	24,097	−5.26%	Middlesborough-Corbin, KY CSA
Brookings, OR μSA	22,621	23,446	−3.52%	Brookings-Crescent City, OR-CA CSA
Worthington, MN μSA	22,338	22,290	+0.22%	
Elk City, OK μSA	22,159	22,410	−1.12%	Weatherford-Elk City, OK CSA
Magnolia, AR μSA	21,894	22,801	−3.98%	
Dumas, TX μSA	21,891	21,358	+2.50%	
Oskaloosa, IA μSA	21,880	22,190	−1.40%	Des Moines-West Des Moines-Ames, IA CSA
Forrest City, AR μSA	21,800	23,090	−5.59%	Memphis-Clarksdale-Forrest City, TN-MS-AR CSA
Pampa, TX μSA	21,786	22,054	−1.22%	
Beatrice, NE μSA	21,711	21,704	+0.03%	Lincoln-Beatrice, NE CSA
Othello, WA μSA	21,488	20,613	+4.24%	Moses Lake-Othello, WA CSA
Jamestown, ND μSA	21,414	21,593	−0.83%	
Vineyard Haven, MA μSA	21,219	20,600	+3.00%	
Liberal, KS μSA	21,073	21,964	−4.06%	
Arkadelphia, AR μSA	20,938	21,446	−2.37%	
Franklin, KY μSA	20,788	19,594	+6.09%	Bowling Green-Glasgow-Franklin, KY CSA
Price, UT μSA	20,680	20,412	+1.31%	
Sterling, CO μSA	20,654	21,528	−4.06%	
Pierre, SD μSA	20,588	20,745	−0.76%	
Storm Lake, IA μSA	20,449	20,823	−1.80%	
Guymon, OK μSA	20,322	21,384	−4.97%	
Carroll, IA μSA	20,303	20,760	−2.20%	
Maryville, MO μSA	20,174	21,241	−5.02%	
Raymondville, TX μSA	19,971	20,164	−0.96%	Brownsville-Harlingen-Raymondville, TX CSA
Clarksdale, MS μSA	19,849	21,390	−7.20%	Memphis-Clarksdale-Forrest City, TN-MS-AR CSA
Ruidoso, NM μSA	19,844	20,269	−2.10%	
Woodward, OK μSA	19,827	20,470	−3.14%	
Borger, TX μSA	19,633	20,617	−4.77%	Amarillo-Borger, TX CSA
Huron, SD μSA	19,624	19,149	+2.48%	
Port Lavaca, TX μSA	19,599	20,106	−2.52%	Victoria-Port Lavaca, TX CSA
Fairmont, MN μSA	19,440	20,025	−2.92%	
Los Alamos, NM μSA	19,407	19,419	−0.06%	Albuquerque-Santa Fe-Los Alamos, NM CSA
Cordele, GA μSA	19,237	20,128	−4.43%	
Andrews, TX μSA	18,914	18,610	+1.63%	Midland-Odessa-Andrews, TX CSA
Hereford, TX μSA	18,626	18,583	+0.23%	
Bishop, CA μSA	18,158	19,016	−4.51%	
Spirit Lake, IA μSA	18,077	17,703	+2.11%	Spencer-Spirit Lake, IA CSA
Winnemucca, NV μSA	17,267	17,285	−0.10%	
Fitzgerald, GA μSA	17,099	17,194	−0.55%	
Baker City, OR μSA	16,658	16,668	−0.06%	
Spencer, IA μSA	16,202	16,384	−1.11%	Spencer-Spirit Lake, IA CSA
Atchison, KS μSA	16,172	16,348	−1.08%	Kansas City-Overland Park-Kansas City, MO-KS CSA
Snyder, TX μSA	16,162	16,932	−4.55%	
Vermillion, SD μSA	15,031	14,967	+0.43%	
Nantucket, MA μSA	14,758	14,255	+3.53%	
Sweetwater, TX μSA	14,117	14,738	−4.21%	Abilene-Sweetwater, TX CSA
Zapata, TX μSA	13,753	13,889	−0.98%	
Ketchikan, AK μSA	13,549	13,948	−2.86%	
Vernon, TX μSA	12,481	12,887	−3.15%	
Town of Pecos, TX μSA	12,138	14,748	−17.70%	

See the distribution of statistical areas for the number of core-based statistical areas by state.

== Puerto Rico ==
The following sortable table lists the 10 core-based statistical areas (CBSAs) of Puerto Rico with the following information:

1. The CBSA rank by population as of July 1, 2023, as estimated by the United States Census Bureau
2. The CBSA name as designated by the United States Office of Management and Budget
3. The CBSA population as of July 1, 2025, as estimated by the United States Census Bureau
4. The CBSA population as of April 1, 2020, as enumerated by the 2020 United States census
5. The CBSA percent population change from April 1, 2020, to July 1, 2025
6. The combined statistical area (CSA) if the CBSA is a component

The 10 core-based statistical areas of the Commonwealth of Puerto Rico
Rank	Core-based statistical area	2025 estimate	2020 census	Change	Encompassing combined statistical area
1	San Juan-Bayamón-Caguas, PR MSA	2,024,195	2,081,265	−2.74%	San Juan-Bayamón, PR
2	Ponce, PR MSA	262,792	278,477	−5.63%	Ponce-Coamo, PR
3	Aguadilla, PR MSA	250,088	253,768	−1.45%	Mayagüez-Aguadilla, PR
4	Mayagüez, PR MSA	206,355	213,831	−3.50%	Mayagüez-Aguadilla, PR
5	Arecibo, PR MSA	179,229	182,705	−1.90%	San Juan-Bayamón, PR
6	Guayama, PR MSA	63,864	68,442	−6.69%	San Juan-Bayamón, PR
7	Coamo, PR μSA	52,623	54,949	−4.23%	Ponce-Coamo, PR
8	Lares, PR μSA	27,744	28,105	−1.28%	San Juan-Bayamón, PR
9	Utuado, PR μSA	26,894	28,287	−4.92%	San Juan-Bayamón, PR
10	Coco, PR μSA	24,218	25,789	−6.09%	San Juan-Bayamón, PR

== See also ==
- United States of America
  - Outline of the United States
- Demographics of the United States
  - United States Census Bureau
    - List of U.S. states and territories by population
    - List of United States cities by population
    - List of United States counties and county equivalents
  - United States Office of Management and Budget
    - Statistical area (United States)
      - Combined statistical area
      - Core-based statistical area
        - Metropolitan statistical area
        - Micropolitan statistical area
