= Florida statistical areas =

Coordinates: 28.6305°N 82.4497°W

The U.S. State of Florida currently has 35 statistical areas that have been delineated by the Office of Management and Budget (OMB). On July 21, 2023, the OMB delineated 7 combined statistical areas, 22 metropolitan statistical areas, and 6 micropolitan statistical areas in Florida. As of 2023, the largest of these is the Miami-Port St. Lucie-Fort Lauderdale, FL CSA, inclusive of the southeastern region of the state centered on Miami.

== Statistical areas ==
The Office of Management and Budget (OMB) has designated more than 1,000 statistical areas for the United States and Puerto Rico. These statistical areas are important geographic delineations of population clusters used by the OMB, the United States Census Bureau, planning organizations, and federal, state, and local government entities.

The OMB defines a core-based statistical area (commonly referred to as a CBSA) as the county or counties (or county-equivalents) surrounding at least one densely-settled core of at least 10,000 population, "plus adjacent counties having a high degree of social and economic integration with the core as measured through commuting ties with the counties containing the core". The OMB further divides core-based statistical areas based on population into metropolitan statistical areas (MSAs) for those with at least 50,000 and micropolitan statistical areas (μSAs) for those with 10,000 to 49,999 people.

The OMB defines a combined statistical area (CSA) as two or more adjacent core-based statistical areas where the employment interchange rate (% commuting from A to B plus % commuting from B to A) is at least 15%. The primary statistical areas (PSAs) include all combined statistical areas and any core-based statistical area that is not a constituent of a combined statistical area.

The 35 United States statistical areas and 67 counties of the State of Florida (Note: An out-of-state area and its population are displayed in green. An area that extends into more than one state is displayed in purple. A purple population number over a black population number show the total population versus the in-state population. The state's abbreviation is also shown next to the in-state total.)
Combined statistical area	2025 population (est.)	Core-based statistical area	2025 population (est.)	County	2025 population (est.)	Metropolitan division	2025 population (est.)
Miami-Port St. Lucie-Fort Lauderdale, FL CSA	7,254,264	Miami-Fort Lauderdale-West Palm Beach, FL MSA	6,391,072	Miami-Dade County, Florida	2,802,029	Miami-Miami Beach-Kendall, FL MD	2,802,029
Miami-Port St. Lucie-Fort Lauderdale, FL CSA	7,254,264	Miami-Fort Lauderdale-West Palm Beach, FL MSA	6,391,072	Broward County, Florida	2,013,317	Fort Lauderdale-Pompano Beach-Sunrise, FL MD	2,013,317
Miami-Port St. Lucie-Fort Lauderdale, FL CSA	7,254,264	Miami-Fort Lauderdale-West Palm Beach, FL MSA	6,391,072	Palm Beach County, Florida	1,575,726	West Palm Beach-Boca Raton-Delray Beach, FL MD	1,575,726
Miami-Port St. Lucie-Fort Lauderdale, FL CSA	7,254,264	Port St. Lucie, FL MSA	568,721	St. Lucie County, Florida	402,449	none	
Miami-Port St. Lucie-Fort Lauderdale, FL CSA	7,254,264	Port St. Lucie, FL MSA	568,721	Martin County, Florida	166,272	none	
Miami-Port St. Lucie-Fort Lauderdale, FL CSA	7,254,264	Sebastian-Vero Beach-West Vero Corridor, FL MSA	172,799	Indian River County, Florida	172,799	none	
Miami-Port St. Lucie-Fort Lauderdale, FL CSA	7,254,264	Key West-Key Largo, FL μSA	78,797	Monroe County, Florida	78,797	none	
Miami-Port St. Lucie-Fort Lauderdale, FL CSA	7,254,264	Okeechobee, FL μSA	42,875	Okeechobee County, Florida	42,875	none	
Orlando-Lakeland-Deltona, FL CSA	4,737,167	Orlando-Kissimmee-Sanford, FL MSA	2,957,672	Orange County, Florida	1,528,002	none	
Orlando-Lakeland-Deltona, FL CSA	4,737,167	Orlando-Kissimmee-Sanford, FL MSA	2,957,672	Seminole County, Florida	491,884	none	
Orlando-Lakeland-Deltona, FL CSA	4,737,167	Orlando-Kissimmee-Sanford, FL MSA	2,957,672	Osceola County, Florida	481,718	none	
Orlando-Lakeland-Deltona, FL CSA	4,737,167	Orlando-Kissimmee-Sanford, FL MSA	2,957,672	Lake County, Florida	456,068	none	
Orlando-Lakeland-Deltona, FL CSA	4,737,167	Lakeland-Winter Haven, FL MSA	874,790	Polk County, Florida	874,790	none	
Orlando-Lakeland-Deltona, FL CSA	4,737,167	Deltona-Daytona Beach-Ormond Beach, FL MSA	746,933	Volusia County, Florida	606,573	none	
Orlando-Lakeland-Deltona, FL CSA	4,737,167	Deltona-Daytona Beach-Ormond Beach, FL MSA	746,933	Flagler County, Florida	140,360	none	
Orlando-Lakeland-Deltona, FL CSA	4,737,167	Wildwood-The Villages, FL MSA	157,772	Sumter County, Florida	157,772	none	
none		Tampa-St. Petersburg-Clearwater, FL MSA	3,418,895	Hillsborough County, Florida	1,574,115	Tampa, FL MD	2,470,332
none		Tampa-St. Petersburg-Clearwater, FL MSA	3,418,895	Pasco County, Florida	674,516	Tampa, FL MD	2,470,332
none		Tampa-St. Petersburg-Clearwater, FL MSA	3,418,895	Hernando County, Florida	221,701	Tampa, FL MD	2,470,332
none		Tampa-St. Petersburg-Clearwater, FL MSA	3,418,895	Pinellas County, Florida	948,563	St. Petersburg-Clearwater-Largo, FL MD	948,563
Jacksonville-Kingsland-Palatka, FL-GA CSA	1,925,016; 1,863,795(FL)	Jacksonville, FL MSA	1,785,500	Duval County, Florida	1,062,963	none	
Jacksonville-Kingsland-Palatka, FL-GA CSA	1,925,016; 1,863,795(FL)	Jacksonville, FL MSA	1,785,500	St. Johns County, Florida	346,328	none	
Jacksonville-Kingsland-Palatka, FL-GA CSA	1,925,016; 1,863,795(FL)	Jacksonville, FL MSA	1,785,500	Clay County, Florida	239,593	none	
Jacksonville-Kingsland-Palatka, FL-GA CSA	1,925,016; 1,863,795(FL)	Jacksonville, FL MSA	1,785,500	Nassau County, Florida	106,879	none	
Jacksonville-Kingsland-Palatka, FL-GA CSA	1,925,016; 1,863,795(FL)	Jacksonville, FL MSA	1,785,500	Baker County, Florida	29,737	none	
Jacksonville-Kingsland-Palatka, FL-GA CSA	1,925,016; 1,863,795(FL)	Palatka, FL μSA	78,295	Putnam County, Florida	78,295	none	
Jacksonville-Kingsland-Palatka, FL-GA CSA	1,925,016; 1,863,795(FL)	Kingsland, GA μSA	61,221	Camden County, Georgia	61,221	none	
Cape Coral-Fort Myers-Naples, FL CSA	1,356,003	Cape Coral-Fort Myers, FL MSA	875,607	Lee County, Florida	875,607	none	
Cape Coral-Fort Myers-Naples, FL CSA	1,356,003	Naples-Marco Island, FL MSA	417,131	Collier County, Florida	417,131	none	
Cape Coral-Fort Myers-Naples, FL CSA	1,356,003	Clewiston, FL μSA	63,265	Hendry County, Florida	48,276	none	
Cape Coral-Fort Myers-Naples, FL CSA	1,356,003	Clewiston, FL μSA	63,265	Glades County, Florida	13,270	none	
North Port-Bradenton, FL CSA	1,202,637	North Port-Bradenton-Sarasota, FL MSA	948,158	Sarasota County, Florida	479,958	none	
North Port-Bradenton, FL CSA	1,202,637	North Port-Bradenton-Sarasota, FL MSA	948,158	Manatee County, Florida	468,200	none	
North Port-Bradenton, FL CSA	1,202,637	Punta Gorda, FL MSA	217,212	Charlotte County, Florida	217,212	none	
North Port-Bradenton, FL CSA	1,202,637	Arcadia, FL μSA	37,267	DeSoto County, Florida	37,267	none	
none		Palm Bay-Melbourne-Titusville, FL MSA	663,982	Brevard County, Florida	663,982	none	
none		Pensacola-Ferry Pass-Brent, FL MSA	544,949	Escambia County, Florida	333,834	none	
none		Pensacola-Ferry Pass-Brent, FL MSA	544,949	Santa Rosa County, Florida	211,115	none	
Gainesville-Lake City, FL CSA	433,503	Gainesville, FL MSA	359,036	Alachua County, Florida	290,028	none	
Gainesville-Lake City, FL CSA	433,503	Gainesville, FL MSA	359,036	Levy County, Florida	48,520	none	
Gainesville-Lake City, FL CSA	433,503	Gainesville, FL MSA	359,036	Gilchrist County, Florida	20,488	none	
Gainesville-Lake City, FL CSA	433,503	Lake City, FL μSA	74,467	Columbia County, Florida	74,467	none	
none		Ocala, FL MSA	442,660	Marion County, Florida	442,660	none	
Tallahassee-Bainbridge, FL-GA CSA	426,843; 397,442(FL)	Tallahassee, FL MSA	397,442	Leon County, Florida	299,048	none	
Tallahassee-Bainbridge, FL-GA CSA	426,843; 397,442(FL)	Tallahassee, FL MSA	397,442	Gadsden County, Florida	44,298	none	
Tallahassee-Bainbridge, FL-GA CSA	426,843; 397,442(FL)	Tallahassee, FL MSA	397,442	Wakulla County, Florida	38,089	none	
Tallahassee-Bainbridge, FL-GA CSA	426,843; 397,442(FL)	Tallahassee, FL MSA	397,442	Jefferson County, Florida	16,007	none	
Tallahassee-Bainbridge, FL-GA CSA	426,843; 397,442(FL)	Bainbridge, GA μSA	29,401	Decatur County, Georgia	29,401	none	
none		Crestview-Fort Walton Beach-Destin, FL MSA	315,098	Okaloosa County, Florida	221,810	none	
none		Crestview-Fort Walton Beach-Destin, FL MSA	315,098	Walton County, Florida	93,288	none	
none		Panama City-Panama City Beach, FL MSA	231,174	Bay County, Florida	204,479	none	
none		Panama City-Panama City Beach, FL MSA	231,174	Washington County, Florida	26,695	none	
none		Homosassa Springs, FL MSA	171,666	Citrus County, Florida	171,666	none	
none		Sebring, FL MSA	111,122	Highlands County, Florida	111,122	none	
none		none		Jackson County, Florida	49,629	none	
none		none		Suwannee County, Florida	48,149	none	
none		none		Bradford County, Florida	28,307	none	
none		none		Hardee County, Florida	25,932	none	
none		none		Taylor County, Florida	21,210	none	
none		none		Holmes County, Florida	20,119	none	
none		none		Madison County, Florida	18,759	none	
none		none		Dixie County, Florida	18,038	none	
none		none		Gulf County, Florida	15,943	none	
none		none		Union County, Florida	16,250	none	
none		none		Hamilton County, Florida	14,180	none	
none		none		Calhoun County, Florida	13,289	none	
none		none		Franklin County, Florida	13,029	none	
none		none		Lafayette County, Florida	8,792	none	
none		none		Liberty County, Florida	8,035	none	
State of Florida					23,462,299	none	

The 28 core-based statistical areas of the State of Florida
2025 rank	Primary statistical area	Population				
2025 rank	Primary statistical area	2025 estimate	Change	2020 Census	Change	2010 Census
1	Miami-Fort Lauderdale-West Palm Beach, FL MSA	6,391,072	+4.12%	6,138,333	+10.31%	5,564,635
2	Tampa-St. Petersburg-Clearwater, FL MSA	3,418,895	+7.67%	3,175,275	+14.09%	2,783,243
3	Orlando-Kissimmee-Sanford, FL MSA	2,957,672	+10.63%	2,673,376	+25.25%	2,134,411
4	Jacksonville, FL MSA	1,785,500	+11.19%	1,605,848	+19.34%	1,345,596
5	North Port-Bradenton-Sarasota, FL MSA	948,158	+13.73%	833,716	+18.72%	702,281
6	Cape Coral-Fort Myers, FL MSA	875,607	+15.09%	760,822	+22.96%	618,754
7	Lakeland-Winter Haven, FL MSA	874,790	+20.65%	725,046	+20.42%	602,095
8	Deltona-Daytona Beach-Ormond Beach, FL MSA	746,933	+11.66%	668,921	+13.32%	590,289
9	Palm Bay-Melbourne-Titusville, FL MSA	663,982	+9.46%	606,612	+11.64%	543,376
10	Port St. Lucie, FL MSA	568,721	+16.62%	487,657	+14.98%	424,107
11	Pensacola-Ferry Pass-Brent, FL MSA	544,949	+6.87%	509,905	+13.57%	448,991
12	Ocala, FL MSA	442,660	+17.76%	375,908	+13.47%	331,298
13	Naples-Marco Island, FL MSA	417,131	+11.01%	375,752	+16.87%	321,520
14	Tallahassee, FL MSA	397,442	+3.42%	384,298	+4.60%	367,413
15	Gainesville, FL MSA	359,036	+5.83%	339,247	+11.20%	305,076
16	Crestview-Fort Walton Beach-Destin, FL MSA	315,098	+9.80%	286,973	+21.67%	235,865
17	Panama City, FL MSA	231,174	+15.28%	200,534	+3.50%	193,748
18	Punta Gorda, FL MSA	217,212	+16.25%	186,847	+16.80%	159,978
19	Sebastian-Vero Beach-West Vero Corridor, FL MSA	172,799	+8.14%	159,788	+15.76%	138,028
20	Homosassa Springs, FL MSA	171,666	+11.59%	153,843	+8.93%	141,236
21	Wildwood-The Villages, FL MSA	157,772	+21.60%	129,752	+38.89%	93,420
22	Sebring, FL MSA	111,122	+9.77%	101,235	+2.48%	98,786
23	Key West-Key Largo, FL μSA	78,797	−4.92%	82,874	+13.39%	73,090
24	Palatka, FL μSA	78,295	+6.78%	73,321	−1.40%	74,364
25	Lake City, FL μSA	74,467	+6.84%	69,698	+3.21%	67,531
26	Clewiston, FL μSA	63,265	+22.26%	51,745	−0.54%	52,024
27	Okeechobee, FL μSA	42,875	+8.15%	39,644	−0.88%	39,996
28	Arcadia, FL μSA	37,267	+9.69%	33,976	−2.54%	34,862

The seven combined statistical areas of the State of Florida (Note: For CSAs comprising populations from multiple states, they are listed twice to show both their intrastate population within that CSA as well as the CSA's total population. Only the intrastate population is ranked.)
2025 rank	Primary statistical area	Population				
2025 rank	Primary statistical area	2025 estimate	Change	2020 Census	Change	2010 Census
1	Miami-Port St. Lucie-Fort Lauderdale, FL CSA	7,254,264	+5.01%	6,908,296	+10.71%	6,239,856
2	Orlando-Lakeland-Deltona, FL CSA	4,737,167	+12.87%	4,197,095	+22.71%	3,420,215
3	Jacksonville-Kingsland-Palatka, FL-GA CSA (FL)	1,863,795	+11.00%	1,679,169	+18.25%	1,419,960
4	Cape Coral-Fort Myers-Naples, FL CSA	1,356,003	+14.11%	1,188,319	+19.75%	992,298
5	North Port-Bradenton, FL CSA	1,202,637	+14.04%	1,054,539	+17.55%	897,121
6	Gainesville-Lake City, FL CSA	433,503	+6.01%	408,945	+9.75%	372,607
7	Tallahassee-Bainbridge, FL-GA CSA (FL)	397,442	+3.42%	384,298	+4.60%	367,413
	Jacksonville-Kingsland-Palatka, FL-GA CSA	1,925,016	+11.02%	1,733,937	+17.92%	1,470,473
	Tallahassee-Bainbridge, FL-GA CSA	426,843	+3.19%	413,665	+4.66%	395,255

== See also ==
- Geography of Florida
  - Demographics of Florida
