= Cinco Bayou, Florida =

- Town
- Town of Cinco Bayou
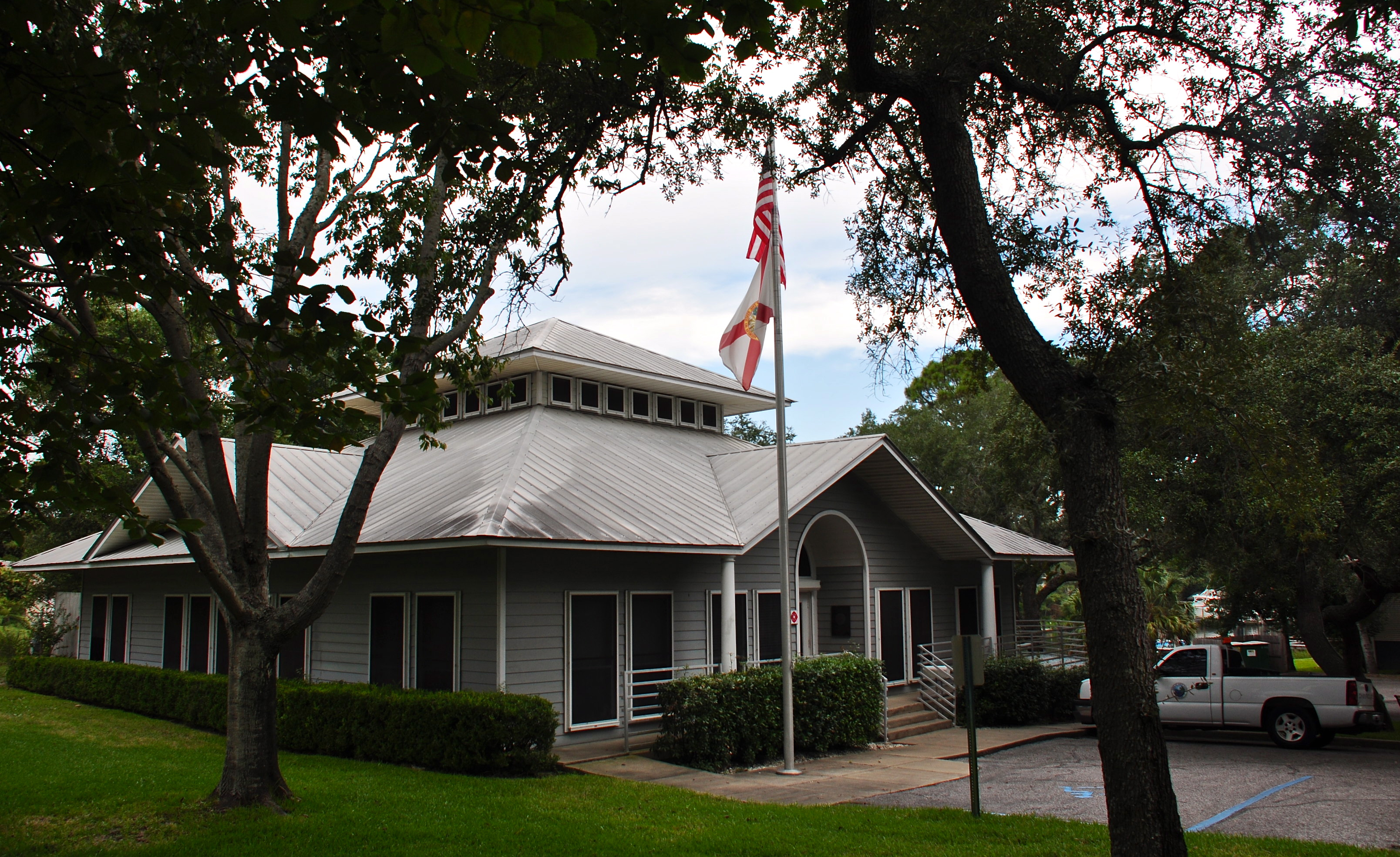
- Cinco Bayou Town Hall, September 2014.

- Seal
- Motto: "Town of Many Parks"
- Location in Okaloosa County and the state of Florida
- Coordinates: 30°25′20″N 86°36′34″W
- Country: United States
- State: Florida
- County: Okaloosa
- Founded: 1940
- Incorporated: July 3, 1950

Government
  - Type: Council-Manager
  - Mayor: Jean M. Hood
  - Mayor Pro Tem: Danny Dillard
  - Councilors: Mary Ann Hawkins, Chris Washack, and Laura Driver
  - Town Manager and Town Clerk: Keith Williams
  - Town Attorney: C. Jeffrey McInnis

Area
  - Total: 0.17 sq mi (0.45 km^{2})
  - Land: 0.17 sq mi (0.45 km^{2})
  - Water: 0 sq mi (0.00 km^{2})
- Elevation: 13 ft (4.0 m)

Population (2020)
  - Total: 457
  - Density: 2,624/sq mi (1,013.1/km^{2})
- Time zone: UTC-6 (Central (CST))
  - Summer (DST): UTC-5 (CDT)
- ZIP code: 32548
- Area code: 850
- FIPS code: 12-12325
- GNIS feature ID: 2406270
- Website: www.cincobayou.com

Cinco Bayou is a town in Okaloosa County, Florida, United States. The Town of Cinco Bayou is part of the Crestview–Fort Walton Beach–Destin, Florida Metropolitan Statistical Area. The population was 457 at the 2020 census, up from 383 at the 2010 census.

== Etymology ==
Cinco Bayou was inspired by the local nickname turned official name of the bayou which has distributary streams forming five bifurcations as well as the causeway that was formerly called the Five Mile Bridge (now Cinco Bayou Bridge) which is located on Elgin Parkway (FL-85). "Cinco" means "five" in Spanish, and developers who platted the subdivision decided to also adopt it as the name of the town.

== History ==
Cinco Bayou was platted in 1940, and the Town of Cinco Bayou officially incorporated as a municipality on July 3, 1950, at a meeting held at the Cinco Bayou garage, attended by about 60 people. Gordon Gibson was elected the first mayor. At this time there were about 250 residents in the area between the Fort Walton city limits and the Cinco Bayou, an east-west oriented finger of water on the west end of the Choctawhatchee Bay.

== Geography ==
According to the United States Census Bureau, the town has a total area of 0.2 square miles (0.52 km^{2}), all land. The town is completely surrounded by the city of Fort Walton Beach.

=== Climate ===
The climate in this area is characterized by hot, humid summers and generally mild winters. According to the Köppen climate classification, the Town of Cinco Bayou has a humid subtropical climate zone (Cfa).

== Demographics ==
Historical population
Census	Pop.	Note	%±
1960	643		—
1970	362		−43.7%
1980	202		−44.2%
1990	322		59.4%
2000	377		17.1%
2010	383		1.6%
2020	457		19.3%
U.S. Decennial Census

=== 2010 and 2020 census ===
Cinco Bayou racial composition (Hispanics excluded from racial categories) (NH = Non-Hispanic)
Race	Pop 2010	Pop 2020	% 2010	% 2020
White (NH)	292	299	76.24%	65.43%
Black or African American (NH)	37	33	9.66%	7.22%
Native American or Alaska Native (NH)	0	0	0.00%	0.00%
Asian (NH)	21	13	5.48%	2.84%
Pacific Islander or Native Hawaiian (NH)	0	0	0.00%	0.00%
Some other race (NH)	2	2	0.52%	0.44%
Two or more races/Multiracial (NH)	8	35	2.09%	7.66%
Hispanic or Latino (any race)	23	75	6.01%	16.41%
Total	383	457	100.00%	100.00%

As of the 2020 United States census, there were 457 people, 288 households, and 171 families residing in the town.

As of the 2010 United States census, there were 383 people, 194 households, and 56 families residing in the town.

=== 2000 census ===
As of the census of 2000, there were 377 people, 212 households, and 82 families residing in the town. The population density was 2,116.0 inhabitants per square mile (817.0/km^{2}). There were 248 housing units at an average density of 1,392.0 per square mile (537.5/km^{2}). The racial makeup of the town was 81.17% White, 12.73% African American, 0.80% Native American, 3.98% Asian, 0.27% from other races, and 1.06% from two or more races. Hispanic or Latino of any race were 3.71% of the population.

In 2000, there were 212 households, out of which 15.1% had children under the age of 18 living with them, 27.8% were married couples living together, 7.1% had a female householder with no husband present, and 61.3% were non-families. 46.2% of all households were made up of individuals, and 8.5% had someone living alone who was 65 years of age or older. The average household size was 1.77 and the average family size was 2.43.

In 2000, in the town, the population was spread out, with 12.5% under the age of 18, 7.2% from 18 to 24, 43.0% from 25 to 44, 25.5% from 45 to 64, and 11.9% who were 65 years of age or older. The median age was 40 years. For every 100 females, there were 96.4 males. For every 100 females age 18 and over, there were 93.0 males.

In 2000, the median income for a household in the town was $28,036, and the median income for a family was $28,750. Males had a median income of $33,750 versus $21,250 for females. The per capita income for the town was $22,425. About 9.9% of families and 15.5% of the population were below the poverty line, including 25.4% of those under age 18 and 4.4% of those age 65 or over.
