= Gainesville–Lake City combined statistical area =

Statistical area in Florida, US

Gainesville–Lake City metropolitan area
- Combined Statistical Area
- Gainesville–Lake City, FL; Combined Statistical Area
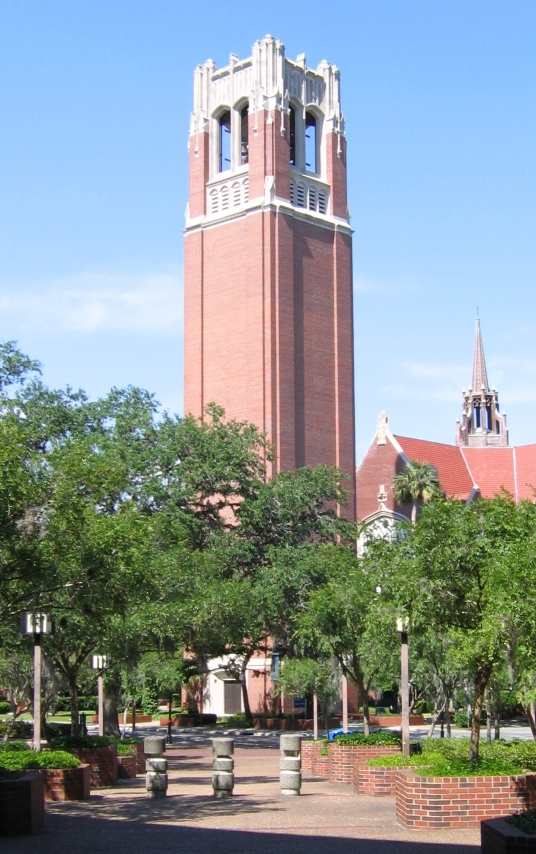
- Century Tower at the University of Florida
Interactive Map of Gainesville–Lake City, FL CSA
City of Gainesville
Gainesville, FL MSA
Lake City, FL µSA
- Country: United States
- State(s): Florida; Georgia
- Principal city: Gainesville
- Other cities: Alachua; Lake City
- Time zone: UTC-5 (EST)
  - Summer (DST): UTC-4 (EDT)

The Gainesville–Lake City, FL Combined Statistical Area consists of the Gainesville, FL Metropolitan Statistical Area and the Lake City, FL Micropolitan Statistical Area. It was defined in 2012.

The CSA had a population of 331,806 in the census of 2010, and an estimated population of 354,299 in 2017.

== See also ==
- Florida statistical areas
