= Findlay–Tiffin combined statistical area =

Coordinates: 41°5′N 83°24′W

Findlay–Tiffin, Ohio Combined Statistical Area
- Combined Statistical Area
- Findlay–Tiffin, Ohio Combined Statistical Area
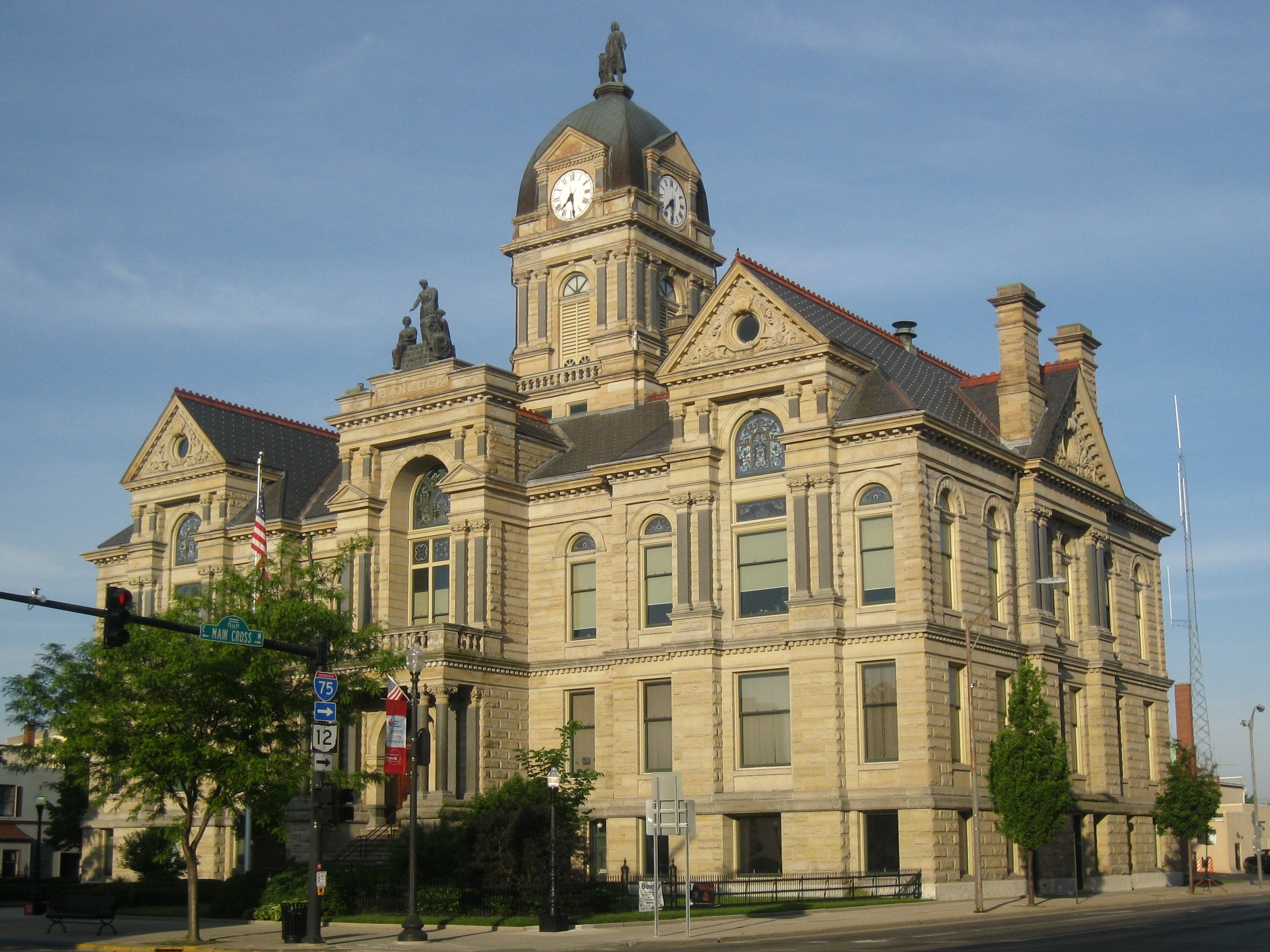
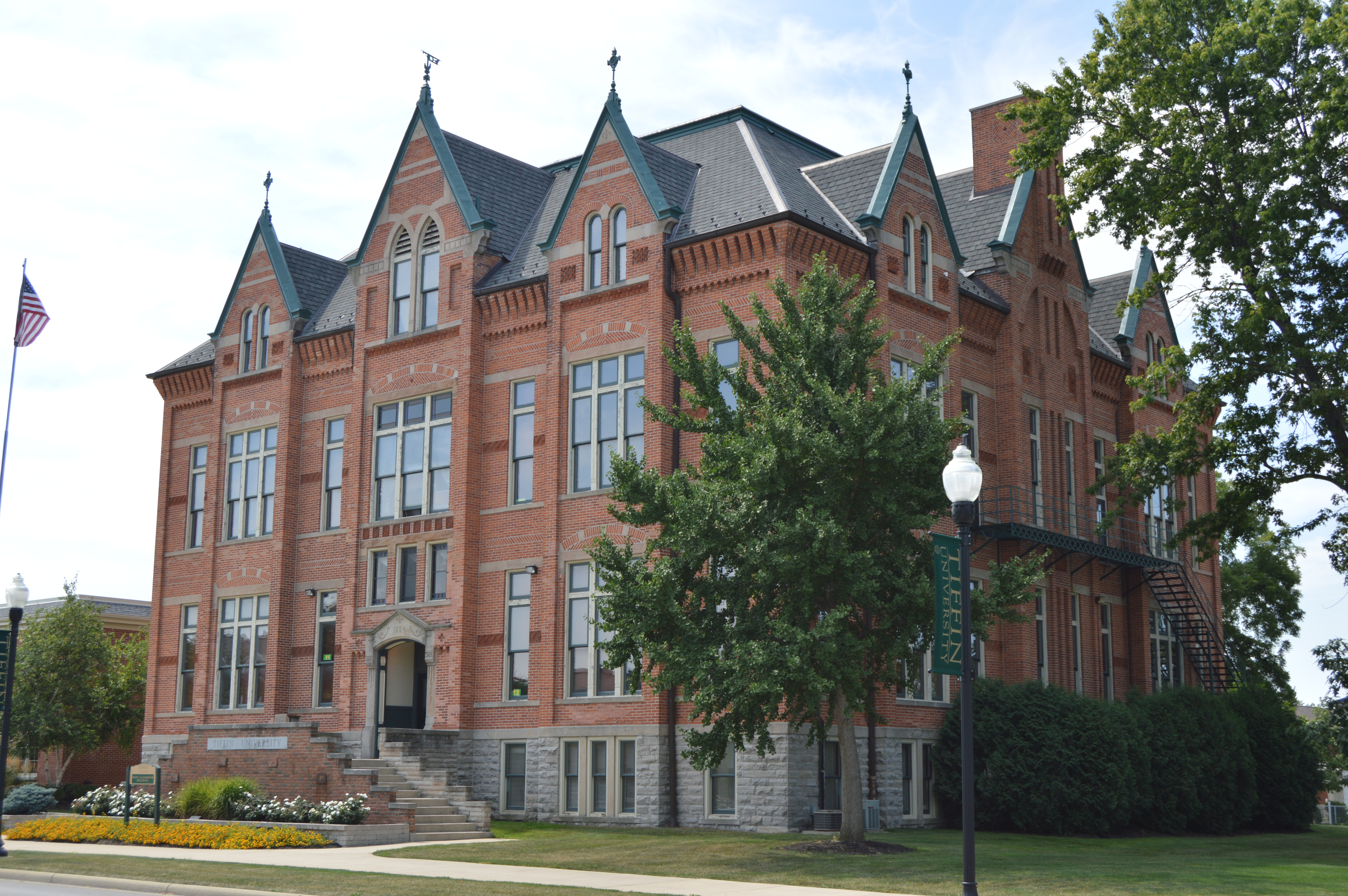
- Hancock County Courthouse in Findlay (top) and Tiffin University in Tiffin (bottom)
- Interactive map of Findlay–Tiffin, Ohio; Combined Statistical Area
- Country: United States
- States: Ohio

Population (2020)
  - CSA: 129,996 (165th)
- Time zone: UTC−5 (EST)
  - Summer (DST): UTC−4 (EDT)
- Area codes: 419 / 567

The Findlay–Tiffin, Ohio Combined Statistical Area includes the counties of Hancock and Seneca in the U.S. state of Ohio. As of the 2020 Census, the population of the combined statistical area was 129,996.
