= Crestview–Fort Walton Beach–Destin metropolitan area =

Metropolitan area in United States

Crestview–Ft. Walton Beach–Destin metropolitan area
- Metropolitan Statistical Area
- Crestview–Ft. Walton Beach–Destin, FL; Metropolitan Statistical Area
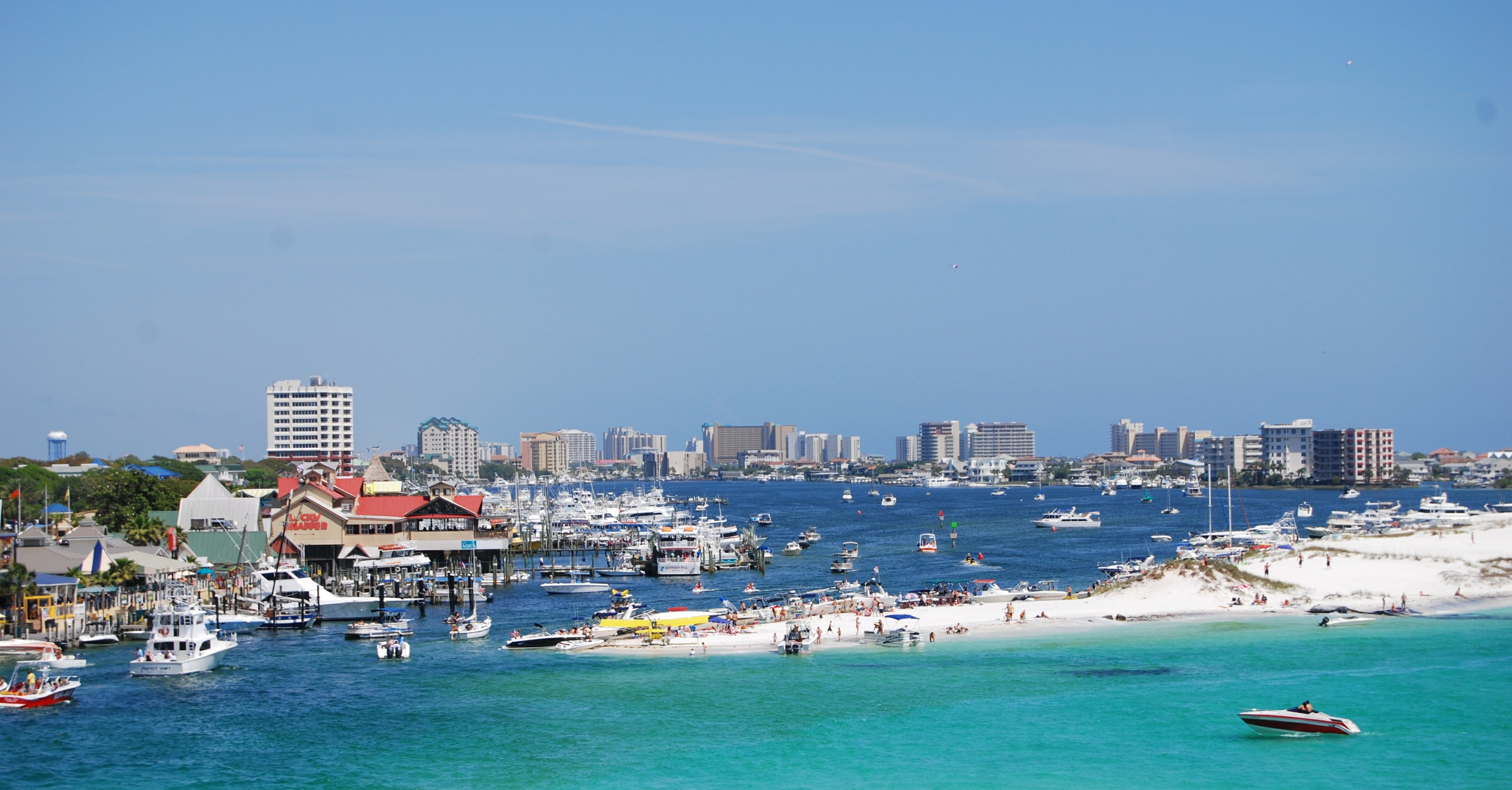
- View of Destin from the Destin Harbor
Interactive Map of Florida Panhandle with
inset of Crestview–Fort Walton Beach MSA
City of Crestview
City of Fort Walton Beach
City of Destin
Pensacola–Ferry Pass–Brent, FL MSA
Crestview–Ft. Walton Beach–Destin, FL MSA
Panama City–Panama City Beach, FL MSA
- Country: United States
- State(s): Florida
- Principal cities: Crestview; Fort Walton Beach; Destin
- Other cities: Santa Rosa Beach; Miramar Beach; DeFuniak Springs
- Time zone: UTC-6 (CST)
  - Summer (DST): UTC-5 (CDT)

The Crestview–Fort Walton Beach–Destin, Florida Metropolitan Statistical Area, as defined by the United States Census Bureau, is a metropolitan area consisting of Okaloosa and Walton counties in northwest Florida, with the principal cities of Crestview, Fort Walton Beach, and Destin. As of the 2020 census, the MSA had a population of 286,993, up from 235,865 at the 2010 census.

The metropolitan area is a part of the "Northwest Corridor" which includes the Pensacola—Ferry Pass—Brent, FL Metropolitan Statistical Area and the Panama City—Panama City Beach, FL Metropolitan Statistical Area.

== Counties ==
- Okaloosa
- Walton

== Communities ==
=== Places with 20,000 to 50,000 inhabitants ===
- Crestview
- Fort Walton Beach

=== Places with 5,000 to 20,000 inhabitants ===
- DeFuniak Springs
- Destin
- Miramar Beach
- Niceville
- Santa Rosa Beach
- Valparaiso
- Freeport

=== Places with 1,000 to 5,000 inhabitants ===
- Mary Esther

=== Places with 500 to 1,000 inhabitants ===
- Laurel Hill
- Paxton
- Shalimar

=== Places with fewer than 500 inhabitants ===
- Cinco Bayou

== Demographics ==
As of the census of 2010, there were 235,865 people, 95,892 households, and 63,964 families residing within the MSA. The racial makeup of the MSA was 81.1% White, 9.3% African American, 0.3% Native American, 2.9% Asian, 0.1% Pacific Islander, 0.2% from other races, and 3.9% from two or more races. Hispanic or Latino of any race were 6.8% of the population.

According to the 2010 American Community Survey 1-Year Estimates, the median income for a household in the MSA was $52,303 and the median income for a family was $62,757. For full-time, year round employment, males had a median earnings of $42,955 versus $33,220 for females. The per capita income for the MSA was $27,071.

County	Seat	2025 estimate	2020 census	Change	Land area	Density
Okaloosa	Crestview	221,810	211,688	+4.78%	930 sq mi (2,400 km^{2})	239/sq mi (92/km^{2})
Walton	DeFuniak Springs	93,288	73,305	+27.26%	1,038 sq mi (2,690 km^{2})	90/sq mi (35/km^{2})
Total		315,098	286,973	+9.80%	1,968 sq mi (5,100 km^{2})	160/sq mi (62/km^{2})

== See also ==
- Florida statistical areas
