= Deltona–Daytona Beach–Ormond Beach metropolitan area =

Daytona Beach Area
- Metropolitan Statistical Area
- Deltona–Daytona Beach–Ormond Beach, Florida Metropolitan Statistical Area
- Daytona International Speedway
Interactive Map of Deltona–Daytona Beach–
Ormond Beach, FL Metropolitan Statistical Area
Deltona–Daytona Beach–Ormond Beach MSA
Other Counties in the Orlando CSA
- Country: United States
- State(s): Florida
- Largest city: Deltona
- Other cities: – Palm Coast – Daytona Beach – Port Orange – Ormond Beach – DeLand – New Smyrna Beach – Edgewater – DeBary – Flagler Beach – Bunnell

Area
  - Total: 2,003.26 sq mi (5,188.4 km^{2})
- Highest elevation: 120.0 ft (36.58 m)
- Lowest elevation: 0 ft (0 m)

Population (2020)
  - Total: 668,921
  - Estimate (2025): 746,933
  - Rank: 83rd in the U.S.
  - Density: 333.916/sq mi (128.926/km^{2})

GDP
  - MSA: $28.134 billion (2022)
- Time zone: UTC−05:00 (EST)
  - Summer (DST): UTC−04:00 (EDT)

The Daytona Beach metropolitan area (officially, for U.S. census purposes, the Deltona–Daytona Beach–Ormond Beach, Florida Metropolitan Statistical Area) is a metropolitan statistical area (MSA) in central and the north portions of Florida consisting of Volusia and Flagler counties in the state of Florida. As of 2025, it is the 83rd-largest MSA in the United States, with a census-estimated population of 746,933. The MSA is a component of the Orlando–Lakeland–Deltona, FL Combined Statistical Area.

== Definitions ==
The MSA was first defined in 1971 as the Daytona Beach, FL Standard MSA, consisting of Volusia County. Flagler County was added to the MSA in 1992. In 2003 the MSA was renamed Deltona–Daytona Beach–Ormond Beach, and Flagler County was removed from the MSA in and designated the Palm Coast, FL Micropolitan Statistical Area (μSA. The Palm Coast area became an MSA in 2006. The Palm Coast MSA was eliminated in 2013, and Flagler County was placed in the Deltona–Daytona Beach–Ormond Beach MSA again.

County	Seat	2025 estimate	2020 Census	Change	Land area	Density
Volusia	DeLand	606,573	553,543	+9.58%	1,101 sq mi (2,850 km^{2})	551/sq mi (213/km^{2})
Flagler	Bunnell	140,360	115,378	+21.65%	485 sq mi (1,260 km^{2})	289/sq mi (112/km^{2})
Total		746,933	668,921	+11.66%	1,586 sq mi (4,110 km^{2})	471/sq mi (182/km^{2})

== Principal cities and towns ==
Daytona Beach, Deltona, Ormond Beach, and DeLand, all located in Volusia County, are designated as principal cities in the MSA.

The city of Palm Coast in Flagler County is the second-largest municipality in the MSA, and the city of Port Orange is larger than Ormond Beach, but neither city qualifies as a principal city.

== Commerce ==
The Volusia/Flagler area is best known for its tourism industry, which attracts millions of visitors each year. Motorsports dominate the area, with several race-track venues as magnets. The best known is Daytona International Speedway, where the headquarters of NASCAR are located. Other racing venues include New Smyrna Speedway and Volusia Speedway Park. Other motorsport events include Daytona Beach Bike Week, a massive biker rally that occurs in March, and several classic-car shows.

The main natural attractions for tourists are the beaches of Volusia and Flagler Counties, with Daytona Beach, Flagler Beach, New Smyrna Beach, and Ormond Beach being the largest draws. Summer is usually the high season for beach tourism in this area.

== Transportation ==
=== Roads ===
Limited-access highways in the Volusia/Flagler area include:

- Interstate 95, the main highway through the area, connects with Jacksonville to the north and Miami to the south.
- Interstate 4, which has its eastern terminus at I-95 in Daytona Beach, travels west to connect with Orlando and the Walt Disney World Resort.

Major surface highways include:

- US 1
- US 17
- US 92

=== Mass transit ===
Public bus transportation in Volusia County is provided by Volusia County Public Transit System (VOTRAN), which connects all the major cities. Paratransit service is also offered by VOTRAN.

Commuter rail service from western Volusia County to Sanford, Orlando, and Kissimmee is provided by SunRail, with the northern terminus located in DeLand.

== See also ==
- Central Florida
- Greater Orlando
- Halifax area
- Florida statistical areas
