= List of most populous cities in Florida by decade =

This list tracks and ranks the population of the ten most populous cities and other settlements in the State of Florida by decade, as reported by each decennial United States census, starting with the 1830 census.

The Census Bureau's definition of an "urban place" has included a variety of designations, including city, town, township, village, borough, and municipality. The top places from 1830 through 1850 consisted of various places designated as cities, towns and other settlements. The top 10 urban areas in 2020 are all separate incorporated places.

This list generally refers only to the population of individual urban places within their defined limits at the time of the indicated census. (Note: In the earlier censuses, the rankings were not definite due to the fact that not all cities were enumerated separately.) Some of these places have since been annexed or merged into other cities. Other places may have expanded their borders due to such annexation or consolidation.

== 1830 ==
The first United States Census taken as the Territory of Florida.

Rank	City	County	Population	Notes
1	St. Augustine	St. Johns	1,708	The only city enumerated separately.

== 1840 ==
Rank	City	County	Population	Notes
1	St. Augustine	St. Johns	2,450	
2	Tallahassee	Leon	1,616	
3	Key West	Monroe	688	

== 1850 ==
The 1850 census is the first census taken since statehood in 1845.

Rank	City	County	Population	Notes
1	Pensacola	Escambia	2,164	
2	Key West	Monroe	1,943	Original return incomplete as slave population was unavailable.
3	St. Augustine	St. Johns	1,934	
4	Jacksonville	Duval	1,045	
5	Tampa	Hillsborough	974	Population include soldiers stationed at Fort Brooke.
6	Marianna	Jackson	377	
7	Monticello	Jefferson	329	
8	Ocala	Marion	243	
9	Newport	Wakulla	232	
10	St. Marks	Wakulla	189	

== 1860 ==
1860 was the eve of the American Civil War. This was the eighth United States census. The majority of the population lived in cities and towns in Northern Florida. In summary, nine out of ten cities would exceed 1,000 residents.

Rank	City	County	Population	Notes
1	Pensacola	Escambia	2,876	
2	Key West	Monroe	2,832	
3	Jacksonville	Duval	2,118	
4	Tallahassee	Leon	1,932	
5	St. Augustine	St. Johns	1,914	
6	Apalachicola	Franklin	1,904	First appearance in the top 10.
7	Milton	Santa Rosa	1,815	First appearance in the top 10.
8	Fernandina	Nassau	1,390	First appearance in the top 10.
9	Monticello	Jefferson	1,083	
10	Lake City	Columbia	659	First appearance in the top 10.

== 1870 ==
This was the ninth United States census.

Rank	City	County	Population	Notes
1	Jacksonville	Duval	6,912	Becomes Florida's largest city for this census only. Would regain this status in 1900.
2	Key West	Monroe	5,016	Includes population outside of city limits. The municipality was not returned separately.
3	Pensacola	Escambia	3,347	
4	Tallahassee	Leon	2,023	
5	Fernandina	Nassau	1,722	
6	St. Augustine	St. Johns	1,717	
7	Apalachicola	Franklin	1,129	
8	Monticello	Jefferson	1,052	Last appearance in the top 10.
9	Milton	Santa Rosa	1,014	
10	Lake City	Columbia	964	

== 1880 ==
Rank	City	County	Population	Notes
1	Key West	Monroe	9,890	Becomes Florida's largest city for this census & in 1890. Jacksonville would regain this status in 1900.
2	Jacksonville	Duval	7,650	
3	Pensacola	Escambia	6,845	
4	Fernandina	Nassau	2,502	
5	Tallahassee	Leon	2,494	
6	St. Augustine	St. Johns	2,293	
7	Palatka	Putnam	1,616	First appearance in the top 10.
8	Lake City	Columbia	1,379	
9	Apalachicola	Franklin	1,336	
10	Milton	Santa Rosa	1,058	Last appearance in the top 10.

== 1890 ==
The 1890 census was the eleventh.

Rank	City	County	Population	Notes
1	Key West	Monroe	18,080	First city in the Florida to surpass 10,000 residents.
2	Jacksonville	Duval	17,201	
3	Pensacola	Escambia	11,750	
4	Tampa	Hillsborough	5,532	
5	St. Augustine	St. Johns	4,742	
6	Palatka	Putnam	3,039	
7	Tallahassee	Leon	2,934	
8	Ocala	Marion	2,904	
9	Orlando	Orange	2,856	First appearance in the top 10.
10	Fernandina	Nassau	2,803	

== 1895 ==
The 1895 census was the second conducted by the State of Florida.

Rank	City	County	Population	Notes
1	Jacksonville	Duval	25,130	Becomes Florida's largest city for the second time. Would hold title until 1950.
2	Key West	Monroe	16,502	
3	Tampa	Hillsborough	15,643	
4	Pensacola	Escambia	14,084	
5	Ocala	Marion	4,597	
6	St. Augustine	St. Johns	4,151	
7	Tallahassee	Leon	3,931	
8	Gainesville	Alachua	3,152	First appearance in the top 10.
9	Apalachicola	Franklin	3,061	Last appearance in the top 10.
10	Orlando	Orange	2,993	

== 1900 ==
The 1900 census was the twelfth.

Rank	City	County	Population	Notes
1	Jacksonville	Duval	28,045	
2	Pensacola	Escambia	17,747	
3	Key West	Monroe	17,114	
4	Tampa	Hillsborough	15,839	
5	St. Augustine	St. Johns	4,272	
6	Lake City	Columbia	4,013	
7	Gainesville	Alachua	3,633	
8	Ocala	Marion	3,380	
9	Palatka	Putnam	3,301	Last appearance in the top 10.
10	Fernandina	Nassau	3,245	

== 1905 ==
The 1905 census was the third conducted by the State of Florida.

Rank	City	County	Population	Notes
1	Jacksonville	Duval	35,301	
2	Tampa	Hillsborough	22,823	
3	Pensacola	Escambia	21,505	
4	Key West	Monroe	20,498	
5	Live Oak	Suwannee	7,200	Only appearance in the top 10. The city's population has not since surpassed its 1905 peak.
6	Lake City	Columbia	6,509	
7	Gainesville	Alachua	5,413	
8	St. Augustine	St. Johns	5,121	
9	Fernandina	Nassau	4,959	Last appearance in the top 10.
10	Miami	Dade	4,733	First appearance in top 10.

== 1910 ==
The 1910 census was the thirteenth.

Rank	City	County	Population	Notes
1	Jacksonville	Duval	57,699	
2	Tampa	Hillsborough	37,782	Became Florida's second-largest city.
3	Pensacola	Escambia	22,982	
4	Key West	Monroe	19,945	
5	West Tampa	Hillsborough	8,258	First suburban city to reach the top 10.
6	Gainesville	Alachua	6,183	
7	St. Augustine	St. Johns	5,494	
8	Miami	Dade	5,471	
9	Lake City	Columbia	5,032	Last appearance in the top 10.
10	Tallahassee	Leon	5,018	

== 1915 ==
The 1915 census was the fourth conducted by the State of Florida.

Rank	City	County	Population	Notes
1	Jacksonville	Duval	66,850	
2	Tampa	Hillsborough	48,160	
3	Pensacola	Escambia	23,219	
4	Key West	Monroe	18,495	
5	Miami	Dade	15,592	First appearance in top 5 and becomes South Florida's largest city.
6	West Tampa	Hillsborough	7,837	
7	Lakeland	Polk	7,287	First appearance in the top 10.
8	St. Petersburg	Pinellas	7,186	First appearance in the top 10.
9	Gainesville	Alachua	6,736	
10	Orlando	Orange	6,448	

== 1920 ==
The 1920 census was the fourteenth.

Rank	City	County	Population	Notes
1	Jacksonville	Duval	91,588	First city to reach the top-100 nationally.
2	Tampa	Hillsborough	51,608	
3	Pensacola	Escambia	31,035	Last appearance in the top 3.
4	Miami	Dade	29,571	
5	Key West	Monroe	18,749	Last appearance in the top 5.
6	St. Petersburg	Pinellas	14,237	
7	Orlando	Orange	9,282	
8	West Palm Beach	Palm Beach	8,859	
9	West Tampa	Hillsborough	8,468	Would later be annexed by Tampa in 1925.
10	St. Augustine	St. Johns	8,192	Last appearance in top 10.

== 1930 ==
The 1930 census was the fifteenth. The center of population would shift southward. Three cities would reach 100,000.

Rank	City	County	Population	Notes
1	Jacksonville	Duval	129,549	
2	Miami	Dade	110,637	
3	Tampa	Hillsborough	101,161	
4	St. Petersburg	Pinellas	40,425	
5	Pensacola	Escambia	31,579	
6	Orlando	Orange	27,330	
7	West Palm Beach	Palm Beach	26,610	
8	Lakeland	Polk	18,554	
9	Daytona Beach	Volusia	16,598	
10	Key West	Monroe	12,831	Last appearance in the top 10 since the city's first census in 1840.

== 1940 ==
The 1940 census was the sixteenth. The top three cities would remain over the 100,000 level. Rank for the seven largest cities remained unchanged since 1930.

Rank	City	County	Population	Notes
1	Jacksonville	Duval	173,065	Final appearance as the largest city before consolidation in 1968.
2	Miami	Dade	172,172	
3	Tampa	Hillsborough	108,391	
4	St. Petersburg	Pinellas	60,812	
5	Pensacola	Escambia	37,449	
6	Orlando	Orange	36,736	
7	West Palm Beach	Palm Beach	33,693	
8	Miami Beach	Dade	28,012	First appearance in the top 10.
9	Lakeland	Polk	22,584	
10	Daytona Beach	Volusia	22,068	Final appearance in the top 10.

== 1950 ==
1950 was a watershed year for many cities in Florida. For the first time, Central and South Florida begin to dominate the list with eight out of the top ten cities located in these areas.

Rank	City	County	Population	Notes
1	Miami	Dade	249,276	First of two appearances as Florida's largest city.
2	Jacksonville	Duval	204,517	Peak population before consolidation in 1968.
3	Tampa	Hillsborough	124,681	
4	St. Petersburg	Pinellas	96,738	
5	Orlando	Orange	52,367	
6	Miami Beach	Dade	46,282	
7	Pensacola	Escambia	43,479	
8	West Palm Beach	Palm Beach	43,162	
9	Ft. Lauderdale	Broward	36,328	First appearance in the Top 10.
10	Lakeland	Polk	30,851	Final appearance in the top 10.

== 1960 ==
The 1960 census was the eighteenth. This is the last census in which any city west of the Apalachicola river has been in the top 10.

Rank	City	County	Population	Notes
1	Miami	Dade	291,688	
2	Tampa	Hillsborough	274,970	
3	Jacksonville	Duval	201,030	First ever decline for the city and the lowest rank since 1860.
4	St. Petersburg	Pinellas	181,298	
5	Orlando	Orange	88,035	
6	Fort Lauderdale	Broward	83,643	
7	Hialeah	Dade	66,972	First appearance in the top 10.
8	Miami Beach	Dade	63,145	
9	Pensacola	Escambia	56,752	Last appearance in the top 10.
10	West Palm Beach	Palm Beach	56,308	Last appearance in the top 10.

== 1970 ==
The 1970 census was the nineteenth.

Rank	City	County	Population	Notes
1	Jacksonville	Duval	504,265	Figures shown are for Duval County excluding the cities of Jacksonville Beach, Atlantic Beach, Neptune Beach and Baldwin. (Note: The governments of Jacksonville and Duval County consolidated in 1968.)
2	Miami	Dade	334,859	
3	Tampa	Hillsborough	277,767	
4	St. Petersburg	Pinellas	216,232	
5	Fort Lauderdale	Broward	139,590	
6	Hollywood	Broward	106,873	
7	Hialeah	Dade	102,297	
8	Orlando	Orange	99,006	
9	Miami Beach	Dade	87.072	
10	Tallahassee	Leon	71,897	

== 1980 ==
Rank	City	County	Population	Notes
1	Jacksonville	Duval	540,920	Figures shown are for Duval County excluding the cities of Jacksonville Beach, Atlantic Beach, Neptune Beach and Baldwin.
2	Miami	Dade	346,865	
3	Tampa	Hillsborough	271,523	First decline in a century, when the population fell from 796 in 1870 to 720 in 1880.
4	St. Petersburg	Pinellas	238,647	
5	Fort Lauderdale	Broward	153,279	
6	Hialeah	Dade	145,254	
7	Orlando	Orange	128,291	
8	Hollywood	Broward	121,323	
9	Miami Beach	Dade	96,298	
10	Clearwater	Pinellas	85,170	

== 1990 ==
The 1990 census was the twenty-first.

Rank	City	County	Population	Notes
1	Jacksonville	Duval	635,230	Figures shown are for Duval County excluding the cities of Jacksonville Beach, Atlantic Beach, Neptune Beach and Baldwin.
2	Miami	Dade	358,548	
3	Tampa	Hillsborough	280,015	
4	St. Petersburg	Pinellas	238,629	First decline in the history of the city.
5	Hialeah	Dade	188,004	
6	Orlando	Orange	164,693	
7	Fort Lauderdale	Broward	149,377	First decline in the history of the city.
8	Tallahassee	Leon	124,773	
9	Hollywood	Broward	121,697	
10	Clearwater	Pinellas	98,784	Last appearance in the top 10.

== 2000 ==
The 2000 census was the 22nd in U.S. history. This is the first census when all ten cities passed the 100,000 mark.

Rank	City	County	Population	Notes
1	Jacksonville	Duval	735,503	Figures shown are for Duval County excluding the cities of Jacksonville Beach, Atlantic Beach, Neptune Beach and Baldwin.
2	Miami	Miami-Dade	362,470	
3	Tampa	Hillsborough	303,447	
4	St. Petersburg	Pinellas	248,232	
5	Hialeah	Miami-Dade	226,419	
6	Orlando	Orange	185,951	
7	Fort Lauderdale	Broward	152,397	
8	Tallahassee	Leon	150,624	
9	Hollywood	Broward	139,357	
10	Pembroke Pines	Broward	137,427	

== 2010 ==
Rank	City	County	Population	Notes
1	Jacksonville	Duval	821,784	Figures shown are for Duval County excluding the cities of Jacksonville Beach, Atlantic Beach, Neptune Beach and Baldwin.
2	Miami	Miami-Dade	399,457	
3	Tampa	Hillsborough	335,709	First double-digit growth rate since the 1950s.
4	St. Petersburg	Pinellas	244,769	
5	Orlando	Orange	238,300	
6	Hialeah	Miami-Dade	224,669	First decline in city's history.
7	Tallahassee	Leon	181,376	
8	Fort Lauderdale	Broward	165,521	
9	Port St. Lucie	St. Lucie	164,603	First appearance in the top 10.
10	Pembroke Pines	Broward	154,750	

== 2020 ==
Rank	City	County	Population	Notes
1	Jacksonville	Duval	949,611	Figures shown are for Duval County excluding the cities of Jacksonville Beach, Atlantic Beach, Neptune Beach and Baldwin.
2	Miami	Miami-Dade	442,241	
3	Tampa	Hillsborough	384,959	
4	Orlando	Orange	307,573	
5	St. Petersburg	Pinellas	258,308	
6	Hialeah	Miami-Dade	223,109	
7	Port St. Lucie	St. Lucie	204,851	
8	Tallahassee	Leon	196,169	
9	Cape Coral	Lee	194,016	First appearance in the top 10.
10	Fort Lauderdale	Broward	187,760	

== See also ==
- Florida
  - Demographics of Florida
  - List of municipalities in Florida
  - List of places in Florida
  - Florida statistical areas
  - List of metropolitan areas of Florida
  - List of urbanized areas in Florida (by population)
- List of most populous cities in the United States by decade
