= Demographics of Miami =

- Population pyramid of the City of Miami in 2021
- Population: 442,241 (2020); 449,514 (2022 est.)
- Density: 4,821.56/km^{2} (12,487.8/sq mi)

The demographics of the City of Miami are monitored by the U.S. Census Bureau. Its population of nearly 450,000 ranks 44th in the United States and 2nd in Florida.

== Population ==
Historical population
Census	Pop.	Note	%±
1900	1,681		—
1910	5,471		225.5%
1920	29,571		440.5%
1930	110,637		274.1%
1940	172,172		55.6%
1950	249,276		44.8%
1960	291,688		17.0%
1970	334,859		14.8%
1980	346,865		3.6%
1990	358,648		3.4%
2000	362,470		1.1%
2010	399,457		10.2%
2020	442,241		10.7%
2024 (est.)	487,014		10.1%
U.S. Decennial Census; 1900–1970 1980 1990; 2000 2010 2020 2022

Miami is the largest city in South Florida, the second-largest city in Florida, and is the anchor of the largest metropolitan area in Florida: the Miami metropolitan area, which has over 6 million residents. Despite the city being home to less than a fourteenth (1/14) of the population of the metro area, it is an outlier compared to its neighbors, being nearly twice the size of the next-largest city in the metro: Hialeah. The city also has approximately a sixth of the population of its own county, Miami-Dade, which is the state's largest.

The city witnessed rapid growth over the first half of the twentieth century, as its population grew from 1,681 at the time of the 1900 census to 249,276 at the time of the 1950 census. This made it Florida's largest city, a title it would retain until the Jacksonville Consolidation, when the city of Jacksonville absorbed most of Duval County, nearly tripling its population. Since then, Miami has retained its spot as Florida's second-largest city.

Throughout the latter half of the twentieth century, the city experienced a certain amount of stagnation in its population, with expansion slowing during the 1950s and 1960s before nearly halting in the next three decades as suburbanization occurred. The city grew by 34.3% in the 1950s and 1960s as its population reached 334,859 at the 1970 census. However, in the next three decades, it only grew 8.2%, and by the time of the 2000 census, the city's population stood at 362,470.

In the 2000s and 2010s, spurred by high-rise construction in Downtown Miami, Edgewater, and Brickell, Miami's population began to grow quickly once more. An estimate by the American Community Survey found that the downtown population (from Brickell north to Midtown Miami) grew nearly 40% between 2010 and 2018. From 2000 to 2010, the city's population grew by 10.2% and had reached 399,457 by 2010. In the early 2010s, the city's population crossed a milestone of 400,000 people, and by the time of the 2020 census, it had grown by a further 10.7%, up to a population of 442,241.

Historical racial composition	2020	2010	2000	1990	1980
Hispanic or Latino (any race)	70.2%	70.0%	65.8%	62.5%	55.9%
White (non-Hispanic)	14.0%	11.9%	11.8%	12.2%	19.4%
Black or African American (non-Hispanic)	11.9%	16.3%	19.9%	24.6%	23.7%
Asian and Pacific Islander (non-Hispanic)	1.3%	0.9%	0.6%	0.5%	1.0%
Native American (non-Hispanic)	0.1%	0.1%	0.1%	0.1%	1.0%
Some other race (non-Hispanic)	0.6%	0.2%	0.1%	0.1%	1.0%
Two or more races (non-Hispanic)	2.0%	0.7%	1.7%	N/A	N/A
Population	442,241	399,457	362,470	358,548	346,865

Racial composition before 1980	1970	1960	1950	1940	1930	1920	1910
White (including Hispanic)	76.6%	77.4%	83.7%	78.5%	77.3%	68.5%	58.7%
Black or African American (including Hispanic)	22.7%	22.4%	16.2%	21.4%	22.7%	31.3%	41.3%
Asian (including Hispanic)	0.3%	0.1%	0.1%	0.1%	< 0.1%	0.1%	0.1%
Some other race (including Hispanic)	0.4%	0.1%	0.1%	< 0.1%	N/A	N/A	N/A
Hispanic or Latino	45.3%	N/A	N/A	N/A	N/A	N/A	N/A
Non-Hispanic White	32.9%	N/A	N/A	N/A	N/A	N/A	N/A
Population	334,859	291,688	249,276	172,172	110,637	29,571	5,471

In 1970, the Census Bureau reported Miami's population as 45.3% Hispanic, 32.9% non-Hispanic white, and 22.7% black. Miami's explosive population growth has been driven by internal migration from other parts of the country, up until the 1960s. From 1970 to 2000, population growth in the city was stagnant, as Non-Hispanic White Miamians left and significant immigration from Latin America, particularly Cuba, made up the balance. The city's Hispanic majority solidified itself in this period of time, and in 1985, the city elected its first Cuban-born mayor, Xavier Suarez.

Cubans were 2% of Miami in 1959 (around 10,000), but had risen to 14% in 1964 and 42% in 1983.

The Non-Hispanic Black population of the city of Miami peaked in 1990 at almost 90,000 (making up nearly a quarter of the population of the city). Since then, though, the city's Non-Hispanic Black population has experienced a precipitous and steady decline. At the time of the most recent census in 2020, it was found to be 52,447, only 11.7% of the population. Reasons for this include high costs in areas such as Liberty City and Little Haiti, compounded with gentrification.

The Non-Hispanic White population began to rebound in the twenty-first century, as the monolithically Hispanic areas in the Western and Central parts of Miami experienced population stagnation. This caused them to begin to be outweighed by migration into the Downtown region (not only from Latin America, but also from the rest of the United States). This caused the Non-Hispanic White population to rise from a nadir of 11.8% at the time of the 2000 census to 11.9% at the time of the 2010 census. After this, the Non-Hispanic White population grew significantly faster than the city as a whole did during the 2010s, and by the time of the 2020 census, Non-Hispanic Whites made up 14.0% of the population of the city and numbered 61,829, the highest number since the 1980s. The Non-Hispanic White population of Miami also surpassed the Non-Hispanic Black population of the city during the 2010s.

Demographic characteristics	2020	2010	2000	1990	1980
Households	212,146	183,994	148,388	130,252	134,046
Persons per household	2.08	2.17	2.44	2.69	2.59
Sex Ratio	97.8	99.2	98.9	93.5	88.0
Ages 0–17	16.5%	18.4%	21.7%	23.0%	21.4%
Ages 18–64	69.0%	65.6%	61.3%	60.4%	61.6%
Ages 65 +	14.5%	16.0%	17.0%	16.6%	17.0%
Median age	39.7	38.8	37.7	35.9	38.2
Population	442,241	399,457	362,470	358,548	346,865

Economic indicators
2017–21 American Community Survey	Miami	Miami-Dade County	Florida
Median income	$31,472	$32,513	$34,367
Median household income	$47,860	$57,815	$61,777
Poverty Rate	20.9%	15.7%	13.1%
High school diploma	79.2%	82.5%	89.0%
Bachelor's degree	33.1%	31.7%	31.5%
Advanced degree	13.2%	11.9%	11.7%

Language spoken at home (Note: Language spoken at home among residents at least five years old; only languages (or language groups) which at least 2% of residents have spoken at any time since 1980 are mentioned)	2015 (Note: Refers to 2013–2017 American Community Survey data; the last Decennial Census where language data was collected was in the 2000 census)	2010 (Note: Refers to 2008–2012 American Community Survey data; the last Decennial Census where language data was collected was in the 2000 census)	2000	1990	1980
English	23.0%	22.6%	24.7%	26.7%	36.0%
Spanish or Spanish Creole	70.0%	69.9%	66.6%	64.0%	57.5%
French or Haitian Creole	4.5%	4.9%	6.0%	7.7%	2.6%
Other Languages	2.5%	2.6%	2.7%	1.6%	3.9%

Nativity	2015 (Note: Refers to 2013–2017 American Community Survey data; the last Decennial Census where foreign-born population data was collected was in the 2000 census)	2010 (Note: Refers to 2008–2012 American Community Survey data; the last Decennial Census where foreign-born population data was collected was in the 2000 census)	2000	1990	1980
% population native-born	42.0%	41.9%	40.5%	40.3%	46.3%
... born in the United States	39.3%	39.3%	37.9%	37.3%	43.4%
... born in Puerto Rico or Island Areas	1.8%	1.7%	1.9%	2.2%	2.9%
... born to American parents abroad	0.9%	0.9%	0.6%	0.7%	2.9%
% population foreign-born (Note: Only countries of birth which at least 2% of residents were born in at any time since 1980 are mentioned)	58.0%	58.1%	59.5%	59.7%	53.7%
... born in Cuba	27.6%	27.5%	30.3%	32.1%	35.9%
... born in Nicaragua	5.4%	5.7%	7.2%	7.3%	N/A (Note: Not counted separately; aggregated into "Other" category)
... born in Honduras	5.0%	5.4%	4.5%	1.9%	N/A
... born in Haiti	2.8%	3.2%	3.9%	5.0%	N/A
... born in Colombia	2.8%	2.4%	1.9%	1.2%	N/A
... born in the Dominican Republic	1.7%	1.9%	2.0%	1.2%	0.6%
... born in other countries	12.7%	12.0%	9.7%	11.0%	17.2%

In 2010, 34.4% of city residents were of Cuban origin, 15.8% had a Central American background (7.2% Nicaraguan, 5.8% Honduran, 1.2% Salvadoran, and 1.0% Guatemalan), 8.7% were of South American descent (3.2% Colombian, 1.4% Venezuelan, 1.2% Peruvian, 1.2% Argentine, 1.0% Chilean and 0.7% Ecuadorian), 4.0% had other Hispanic or Latino origins (0.5% Spaniard), 3.2% descended from Puerto Ricans, 2.4% were Dominican, and 1.5% had Mexican ancestry.

As of 2010, 5.6% of city residents were West Indian or Afro-Caribbean American origin (4.4% Haitian, 0.4% Jamaican, 0.4% Bahamian, 0.1% British West Indian, and 0.1% Trinidadian and Tobagonian, 0.1% Other or Unspecified West Indian), 3.0% were Black Hispanics, and 0.4% were Subsaharan African origin.

As of 2010, those of (non-Hispanic white) European ancestry accounted for 11.9% of Miami's population. Of the city's total population, 1.7% were German, 1.6% Italian, 1.4% Irish, 1.0% British, 0.8% French, 0.6% Russian, and 0.5% were Polish.

As of 2010, those of Asian ancestry accounted for 1.0% of Miami's population. Of the city's total population, 0.3% were Indian/Indo-Caribbean (1,206 people), 0.3% Chinese/Chinese Caribbean (1,804 people), 0.2% Filipino (647 people), 0.1% were other Asian (433 people), 0.1% Japanese(245 people), 0.1% Korean (213 people), and 0.0% were Vietnamese (125 people).

In 2010, 1.9% of the population considered themselves to be of only American ancestry (regardless of race or ethnicity), while 0.5% were of Arab ancestry, as of 2010.

Religion in the Miami Metro Area (2014)
1. Protestantism (39.0%)
2. Catholicism (27.0%)
3. Mormonism (0.50%)
4. Eastern Orthodoxy (0.50%)
5. Jehovah's Witnesses (1.00%)
6. Other Christian (1.00%)
7. No religion (21.0%)
8. Judaism (9.00%)
9. Other religion (1.00%)

According to a 2014 study by the Pew Research Center, Christianity is the most-practiced religion in Miami (68%), with 39% professing attendance at a variety of churches that could be considered Protestant, and 27% professing Catholicism. Followed by Judaism (9%); Islam, Buddhism, Hinduism, and a variety of other religions have smaller followings; atheism or no self-identifying organized religious affiliation was practiced by 21%.

There has been a Norwegian Seamen's church in Miami since the early 1980s. In November 2011, Crown Princess of Norway Mette-Marit opened a new building for the church. The church was built as a center for the 10,000 Scandinavians that live in Florida. Around 4,000 of them are Norwegian. The church is also an important place for the 150 Norwegians that work at Walt Disney World in Central Florida.

According to the 2022 Point-In-Time Homeless Count, there were 3,440 homeless people in Miami-Dade County, 970 of which were on the streets. In the city limits of Miami, there were 591 unsheltered homeless people on the streets, up from 555 in 2021.
