= Demographics of Florida =

Historical population
| Census | Pop. | Note | %± |
|---|---|---|---|
| 1830 | 34,730 | | — |
| 1840 | 54,477 | | 56.9% |
| 1850 | 87,445 | | 60.5% |
| 1860 | 140,424 | | 60.6% |
| 1870 | 187,748 | | 33.7% |
| 1880 | 269,493 | | 43.5% |
| 1890 | 391,422 | | 45.2% |
| 1900 | 528,542 | | 35.0% |
| 1910 | 752,619 | | 42.4% |
| 1920 | 968,470 | | 28.7% |
| 1930 | 1,468,211 | | 51.6% |
| 1940 | 1,897,414 | | 29.2% |
| 1950 | 2,771,305 | | 46.1% |
| 1960 | 4,951,560 | | 78.7% |
| 1970 | 6,791,418 | | 37.2% |
| 1980 | 9,746,324 | | 43.5% |
| 1990 | 12,937,926 | | 32.7% |
| 2000 | 15,982,378 | | 23.5% |
| 2010 | 18,801,310 | | 17.6% |
| 2020 | 21,538,187 | | 14.6% |
| 2025 (est.) | 23,462,518 | | 8.9% |
U.S. Decennial Census; 1830–1970 1980 1990; 2000 2010 2020 2025

Florida is the third-most populous state in the United States. Its residents include people from a wide variety of ethnic, racial, national and religious backgrounds. The state has attracted immigrants, particularly from Latin America. Florida's majority ethnic group are European Americans, with approximately 65% of the population identifying as White. National ethnic communities in the state include Cubans, who migrated en masse following the revolution in the mid 20th century. They have been joined by other immigrants from Latin America, and Spanish is spoken by more than 20% of the state's population, with high usage especially in the Miami-Dade County area.

Between the 2010 and 2020 census, the population of the state overall did increase. 50 counties in Florida would experience population growth while 17 counties saw their populations decline. Most of Florida's population lives in urban areas as in the 2020 census, close to 97% of people in Florida resided in metropolitan areas. Florida in the 2022 US Census estimate was the fastest growing state in terms of population and the first time it was the fastest growing since 1957. In the 2020 census Florida had a population density of 401.4 people per square mile.

== Population ==
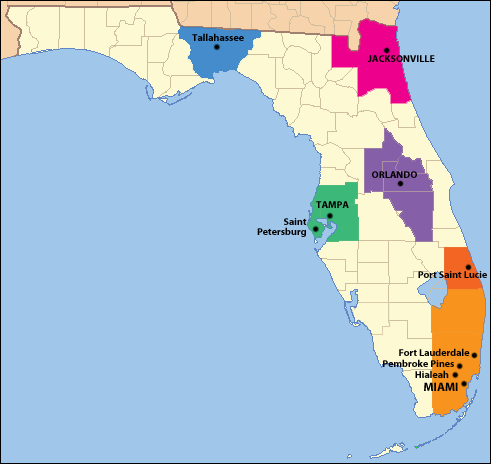
Florida's metropolitan areas and major cities

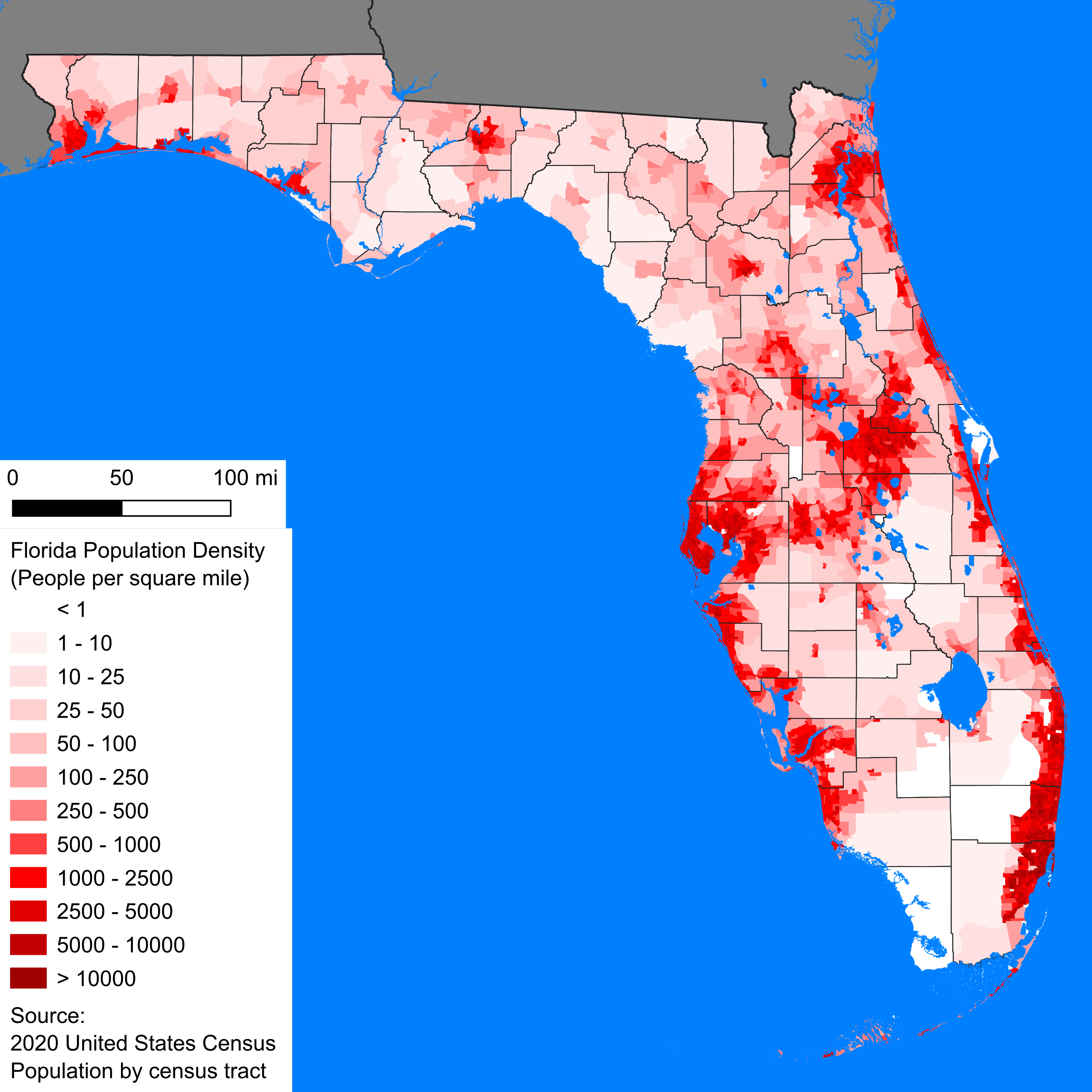
Florida's population density per square mile

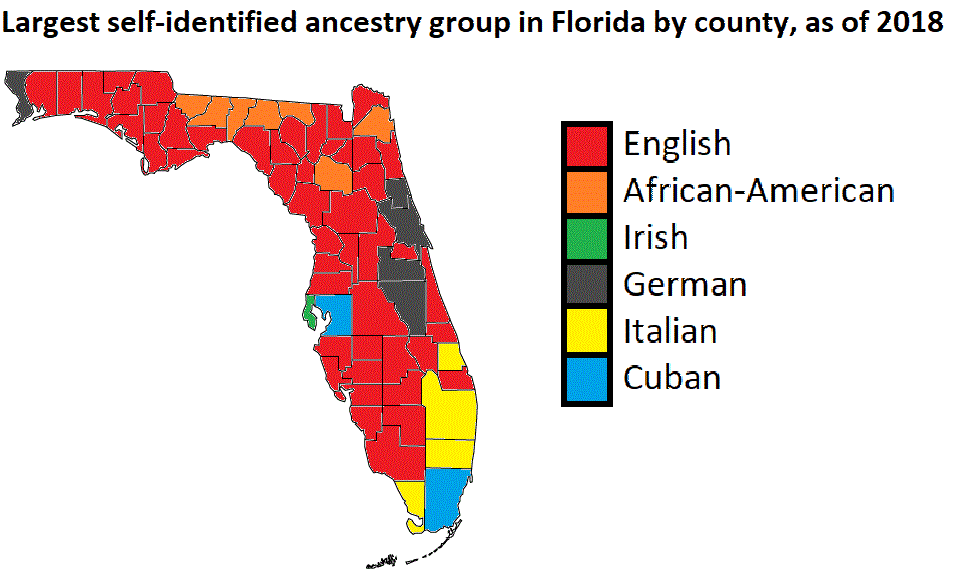
Florida ancestry map

With a population getting close to 23 million people according to the 2023 US Census estimates, Florida is the most populous state in the Southeastern United States, and the second-most populous state in the South behind Texas. Within the United States, it contains the highest percentage of people over 65 (17.3%), and the 8th fewest people under 18 (21.9%). Florida's population growth primarily comes from those moving to the state. The rate of natural change of births and deaths is "typically flat" and actually had negative natural population change in 2020. The 2022 US Census estimate found the largest age group moving to Florida were those from 60 and 69 years old with the second largest age group being those from 50 to 59 years old.

=== Net domestic migration ===
| Year | In-migrants | Out-migrants | Net migration |
|---|---|---|---|
| 2010 | 482,889 | 427,853 | 55,036 |
| 2011 | 498,597 | 437,202 | 61,395 |
| 2012 | 537,148 | 428,325 | 108,823 |
| 2013 | 529,406 | 423,995 | 105,411 |
| 2014 | 546,501 | 437,516 | 108,985 |
| 2015 | 584,938 | 445,320 | 139,618 |
| 2016 | 605,018 | 433,452 | 171,566 |
| 2017 | 566,476 | 447,586 | 118,890 |
| 2018 | 587,261 | 470,977 | 116,284 |
| 2019 | 601,611 | 457,301 | 144,310 |
| 2020 | NA | NA | NA |
| 2021 | 674,740 | 469,577 | 205,163 |
| 2022 | 738,969 | 489,905 | 249,064 |
| 2023 | 636,933 | 510,925 | 126,008 |

=== Population by county by year ===
The population for each respective year comes from the decennial United States Census results.

| County | 2020 | 2010 | 2000 |
|---|---|---|---|
| Alachua | 278,468 | 247,336 | 217,955 |
| Baker | 28,259 | 27,115 | 22,259 |
| Bay | 175,216 | 168,852 | 148,217 |
| Bradford | 28,303 | 28,520 | 26,088 |
| Brevard | 606,612 | 543,376 | 476,230 |
| Broward | 1,944,375 | 1,748,066 | 1,623,018 |
| Calhoun | 13,648 | 14,625 | 13,017 |
| Charlotte | 186,847 | 159,978 | 141,627 |
| Citrus | 153,843 | 141,236 | 118,085 |
| Clay | 218,245 | 190,865 | 140,814 |
| Collier | 375,752 | 321,520 | 251,377 |
| Columbia | 69,698 | 67,531 | 56,513 |
| DeSoto | 33,976 | 34,862 | 32,209 |
| Dixie | 16,759 | 16,422 | 13,827 |
| Duval | 995,567 | 864,263 | 778,879 |
| Escambia | 321,905 | 297,619 | 294,410 |
| Flagler | 115,378 | 95,696 | 49,832 |
| Franklin | 12,451 | 11,549 | 9,829 |
| Gadsden | 43,826 | 46,389 | 45,087 |
| Gilchrist | 17,864 | 16,939 | 14,437 |
| Glades | 12,126 | 12,884 | 10,576 |
| Gulf | 14,192 | 15,863 | 14,560 |
| Hamilton | 14,004 | 14,799 | 13,327 |
| Hardee | 25,327 | 27,731 | 26,938 |
| Hendry | 39,619 | 39,140 | 36,210 |
| Hernando | 194,515 | 172,778 | 130,802 |
| Highlands | 101,235 | 98,786 | 87,366 |
| Hillsborough | 1,459,762 | 1,229,226 | 998,948 |
| Holmes | 19,653 | 19,927 | 18,564 |
| Indian River | 159,788 | 138,028 | 112,947 |
| Jackson | 47,319 | 49,746 | 46,755 |
| Jefferson | 14,510 | 14,761 | 12,902 |
| Lafayette | 8,226 | 8,870 | 7,022 |
| Lake | 383,956 | 297,047 | 210,527 |
| Lee | 760,822 | 618,754 | 440,888 |
| Leon | 292,198 | 275,487 | 239,452 |
| Levy | 42,915 | 40,801 | 34,450 |
| Liberty | 7,974 | 8,365 | 7,021 |
| Madison | 17,968 | 19,224 | 18,733 |
| Manatee | 399,710 | 322,833 | 264,002 |
| Marion | 375,908 | 331,303 | 258,916 |
| Martin | 158,431 | 146,318 | 126,731 |
| Miami-Dade (Dade) | 2,701,767 | 2,496,457 | 2,253,779 |
| Monroe | 82,874 | 73,090 | 79,589 |
| Nassau | 90,352 | 73,314 | 57,663 |
| Okaloosa | 211,668 | 180,822 | 170,498 |
| Okeechobee | 39,644 | 39,996 | 35,910 |
| Orange | 1,429,908 | 1,145,956 | 896,344 |
| Osceola | 388,656 | 268,685 | 172,493 |
| Palm Beach | 1,492,191 | 1,320,134 | 1,131,191 |
| Pasco | 561,891 | 464,697 | 344,768 |
| Pinellas | 959,107 | 916,542 | 921,495 |
| Polk | 725,046 | 602,095 | 483,924 |
| Putnam | 73,321 | 74,364 | 70,423 |
| St. Johns | 273,425 | 190,039 | 123,135 |
| St. Lucie | 329,226 | 277,789 | 192,695 |
| Santa Rosa | 188,000 | 151,372 | 117,743 |
| Sarasota | 434,006 | 379,448 | 325,961 |
| Seminole | 470,856 | 422,718 | 365,199 |
| Sumter | 129,752 | 93,420 | 53,345 |
| Suwannee | 43,474 | 41,551 | 34,844 |
| Taylor | 21,796 | 22,570 | 19,256 |
| Union | 16,147 | 15,535 | 13,442 |
| Volusia | 553,543 | 494,593 | 443,343 |
| Wakulla | 33,764 | 30,776 | 22,863 |
| Walton | 75,305 | 55,043 | 40,601 |
| Washington | 25,318 | 24,896 | 20,973 |
| Total | 21,538,187 | 18,801,332 | 15,982,824 |

=== Age ===
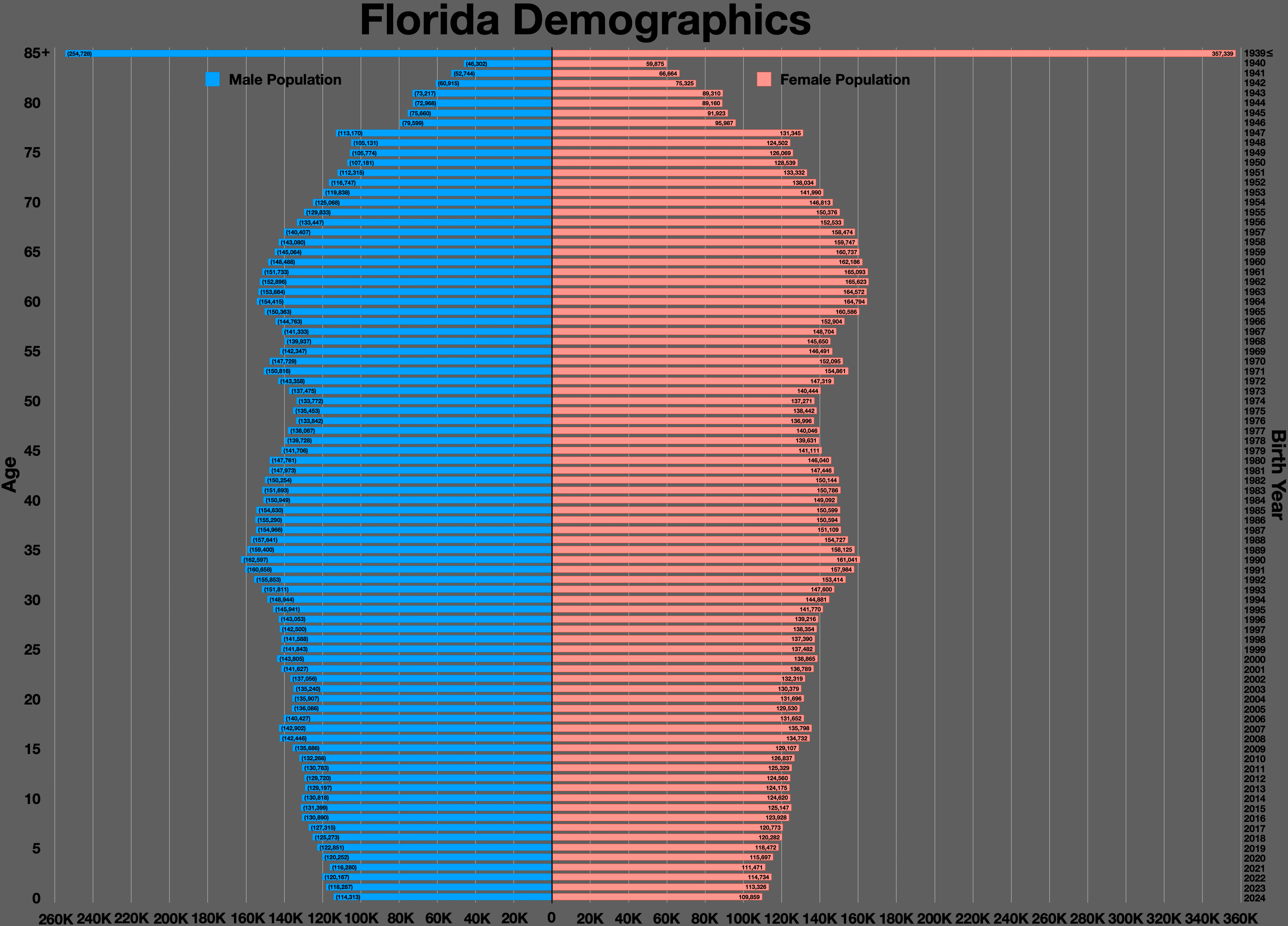
Florida population pyramid

In the 2020 US Census Florida had a median age of 43 years old. The median age was higher for females than males; with the median age being 41.5 for males and 44.5 for females.

=== Housing ===
==== Occupancy rates in Florida ====
The 2020 Census reported there were 9,865,350 housing units in Florida. Most housing units (86.5%) were reported as being occupied and 13.5% were reported as being vacant. Of those which were occupied, 65.1% were occupied by owners while 34.9% by renters. For homes which were vacant the most common category was "For seasonal, recreational, or occasional use" which made up 6.8% of all homes categorized as vacant. Most homes which were for sale or for rent were still occupied.

Housing in Florida by occupancy classification according to the 2010 and 2020 US Censuses
| Year | Occupied | | Vacant | | | | | | | | | | | | Total | |
| Year | Occupied | | For rent | | Rented, not occupied | | For sale only | | Sold, not occupied | | For seasonal, recreational, or occasional use | | All other vacants | | Total | |
| Year | # | % | # | % | # | % | # | % | # | % | # | % | # | % | # | % |
|---|---|---|---|---|---|---|---|---|---|---|---|---|---|---|---|---|
| 2020 | 8,529,067 | 86.5% | 301,255 | 3.1% | 32,162 | 0.3% | 116,289 | 1.2% | 43,437 | 0.4% | 667,183 | 6.8% | 175,957 | 1.8% | 9,865,350 | 100.0% |
| 2010 | 7,420,802 | 82.5% | 371,626 | 4.1% | 15,438 | 0.2% | 198,232 | 2.2% | 31,911 | 0.4% | 657,070 | 7.3% | 294,501 | 3.3% | 8,989,580 | 100% |

==== Households in Florida ====
There were 8,529,067 households in Florida in the 2020 Census and they were most commonly married couples which made up 45.6% of households in Florida.

== Political ==
According to the Florida Department of State, as of June 30, 2026, Republicans have a majority over Democrats in voter registration, with 5,569,028 registered voters compared to the 4,040,000 registered voters that are registered Democrat, while 3,324,324 are registered identify as having no party affiliation and 493,188 are registered to other parties. In total there were 13,426,540 registered voters in Florida.

== Race and ethnicity ==
=== 2020 census ===
According to the 2020 census, the racial distributions was as follows; 51.5% Non-Hispanic White, 26.6% of the population are Hispanics or Latino (of any race), 14.5% African American, 0.4% Native American, 3.0% Asian, 0.6% 'some other race,' and 3.7% multiracial.

Map of counties in Florida by racial plurality, per the 2020 US Census: Non-Hispanic White 30–40% 40–50% 50–60% 60–70% 70–80% 80–90% / Hispanic or Latino 50–60% 60–70% / Black or African American 50–60%

=== 2010 census ===
According to the 2010 census, the racial distributions was as follows; 57.9% Non-Hispanic White, 22.5% of the population were Hispanic or Latino (of any race), 15.2% African American (includes Afro-Caribbeans), 2.4% Asian, 0.3% Native American, 0.3% "some other race," and 1.5% multiracial. Florida has the second largest African-American population in the country, after Texas, & has the highest Latino population on the East Coast. Its ethnic Asian population has grown rapidly since the late 1990s; the majority are Indians (222,576), Filipinos (188,834), Vietnamese (108,825) and ethnic Chinese (142,652). The state has some federally recognized Native American tribes, such as the Seminoles in the southeastern part of the state.

=== 2024 American Community Survey one-year estimates ===
| Racial Makeup of Florida (2024): 1. White alone (54.2%); 2. Black alone (14.8%); 3. Native American alone (0.43%); 4. Asian alone (3.09%); 5. Pacific Islander alone (0.09%); 6. Some other race alone (6.89%); 7. Two or more races (20.6%) | Racial/Ethnic Makeup of Florida excluding Hispanics from Racial Categories (2024); NH=Non-Hispanic: 1. White NH (49.1%); 2. Black NH (14.3%); 3. Native American NH (0.11%); 4. Asian NH (3.02%); 5. Pacific Islander NH (0.08%); 6. Some other race NH (0.69%); 7. Two or more races NH (4.05%); 8. Hispanic Any Race (28.7%) | Racial Makeup of Hispanics in Florida (2024): 1. White alone (17.8%); 2. Black alone (1.66%); 3. Native American alone (1.12%); 4. Asian alone (0.25%); 5. Pacific Islander alone (0.04%); 6. Some other race alone (21.6%); 7. Two or more races (57.5%) |

According to the 2024 US Census Bureau one-year estimates, Florida's population was 54.2% white (49.1% Non-Hispanic White), 14.8% Black or African American, 3.1% Asian, 0.4% Native American and Alaskan Native, 0.1% Pacific Islander, 6.9% Some Other Race, and 20.6% from two or more races. The white population continues to remain the largest racial category as a high percentage of Hispanics in Florida identify as white (17.8%) with others identifying as Some Other Race (21.6%), Multiracial (57.5%), Black (1.7%), American Indian and Alaskan Native (1.1%), Asian (0.3%), and Hawaiian and Pacific Islander (0.1%). By ethnicity, 28.7% of the total population is Hispanic-Latino (of any race) and 71.3% is Non-Hispanic (of any race). If treated as a separate category, Hispanics are the largest minority group in Florida. In 2024, Florida became the 9th state to reach majority-minority status as the non-Hispanic white population has fallen below 50%.

=== Historical composition ===
Florida – Racial and ethnic composition Note: the US Census treats Hispanic/Latino as an ethnic category. This table excludes Latinos from the racial categories and assigns them to a separate category. Hispanics/Latinos may be of any race.
| Race / Ethnicity (NH = Non-Hispanic) | Pop 1980 | Pop 1990 | Pop 2000 | Pop 2010 | Pop 2020 | % 1980 | % 1990 | % 2000 | % 2010 | % 2020 |
|---|---|---|---|---|---|---|---|---|---|---|
| White alone (NH) | 7,473,295 | 9,475,326 | 10,458,509 | 10,884,722 | 11,100,503 | 76.68% | 73.24% | 65.44% | 57.89% | 51.54% |
| Black or African American alone (NH) | 1,317,399 | 1,701,103 | 2,264,268 | 2,851,100 | 3,127,052 | 13.52% | 13.15% | 14.17% | 15.16% | 14.52% |
| Native American or Alaska Native alone (NH) | 19,257 | 32,910 | 42,358 | 47,265 | 42,169 | 0.20% | 0.25% | 0.27% | 0.25% | 0.20% |
| Asian alone (NH) | 56,724 | 146,159 | 261,693 | 445,216 | 629,626 | 0.58% | 1.13% | 1.64% | 2.37% | 2.92% |
| Native Hawaiian or Pacific Islander alone (NH) | x | x | 6,887 | 9,725 | 11,521 | x | x | 0.04% | 0.05% | 0.05% |
| Other race alone (NH) | 21,491 | 8,285 | 28,994 | 48,462 | 137,933 | 0.22% | 0.06% | 0.18% | 0.26% | 0.64% |
| Mixed race or Multiracial (NH) | x | x | 236,954 | 291,014 | 792,143 | x | x | 1.48% | 1.55% | 3.68% |
| Hispanic or Latino (any race) | 858,158 | 1,574,143 | 2,682,715 | 4,223,806 | 5,697,240 | 8.80% | 12.17% | 16.79% | 22.47% | 26.45% |
| Total | 9,746,324 | 12,937,926 | 15,982,378 | 18,801,310 | 21,538,187 | 100.00% | 100.00% | 100.00% | 100.00% | 100.00% |

=== Ancestries ===
| Ancestry | Number (As of 2022) | % |
|---|---|---|
| German | 2,007,413 | 9.0 |
| English | 1,885,506 | 8.5 |
| Irish | 1,827,802 | 8.2 |
| American | 1,646,830 | 7.4 |
| Cuban | 1,556,305 | 7.0 |
| Italian | 1,281,496 | 5.8 |
| Puerto Rican | 1,239,809 | 5.6 |
| Mexican | 722,134 | 3.2 |
| Haitian | 544,043 | 2.4 |
| Polish | 463,313 | 2.1 |
| Colombian | 444,660 | 2.0 |
| Venezuelan | 380,972 | 1.7 |
| French (except Basque) | 378,739 | 1.7 |
| Scottish | 319,847 | 1.4 |
| Dominican | 309,060 | 1.4 |
| Jamaican | 294,487 | 1.3 |
| Indian | 222,576 | 1.0 |
| Filipino | 188,834 | 0.8 |
| Guatemalan | 174,923 | 0.8 |
| Subsaharan African | 174,695 | 0.8 |
| Russian | 171,638 | 0.8 |
| Nicaraguan | 171,579 | 0.8 |
| Honduran | 162,517 | 0.7 |
| Arab | 159,421 | 0.7 |
| Scotch-Irish | 148,942 | 0.7 |
| Swedish | 146,572 | 0.7 |
| Peruvian | 142,916 | 0.6 |
| Chinese | 142,652 | 0.6 |
| Dutch | 141,601 | 0.6 |
| Norwegian | 120,115 | 0.5 |
| Brazilian | 110,733 | 0.5 |
| Vietnamese | 108,825 | 0.5 |
| French Canadian | 101,114 | 0.5 |

== Vital statistics ==
Source: Centers for Disease Control and Prevention (CDC)

| Year | Population | Live births | Deaths | Natural change | Crude birth rate (per 1,000) | Crude death rate (per 1,000) | Natural change (per 1,000) | Crude migration change (per 1,000) |
|---|---|---|---|---|---|---|---|---|
| 1999 | 15,111,244 | 197,023 | 163,224 | 33,799 | 13.04 | 10.80 | 2.24 | 59.72 |
| 2000 | 16,047,515 | 204,125 | 164,395 | 39,730 | 12.72 | 10.24 | 2.48 | 16.81 |
| 2001 | 16,356,966 | 205,793 | 167,269 | 38,524 | 12.58 | 10.23 | 2.36 | 17.97 |
| 2002 | 16,689,370 | 205,579 | 167,814 | 37,765 | 12.32 | 10.06 | 2.26 | 16.59 |
| 2003 | 17,004,085 | 212,250 | 168,657 | 43,593 | 12.48 | 9.92 | 2.56 | 21.62 |
| 2004 | 17,415,318 | 218,053 | 169,008 | 49,045 | 12.52 | 9.70 | 2.82 | 21.69 |
| 2005 | 17,842,038 | 226,240 | 170,791 | 55,449 | 12.68 | 9.57 | 3.11 | 15.10 |
| 2006 | 18,166,990 | 236,802 | 170,066 | 66,736 | 13.03 | 9.36 | 3.67 | 7.38 |
| 2007 | 18,367,842 | 239,165 | 168,096 | 71,069 | 13.02 | 9.15 | 3.87 | 4.81 |
| 2008 | 18,527,305 | 231,445 | 170,703 | 60,742 | 12.49 | 9.21 | 3.28 | 3.49 |
| 2009 | 18,652,644 | 221,394 | 169,924 | 51,470 | 11.87 | 9.11 | 2.76 | 7.61 |
| 2010 | 18,846,143 | 214,590 | 173,791 | 40,799 | 11.39 | 9.22 | 2.16 | 8.95 |
| 2011 | 19,055,607 | 213,414 | 173,976 | 39,438 | 11.20 | 9.13 | 2.07 | 10.86 |
| 2012 | 19,302,016 | 213,148 | 177,291 | 35,857 | 11.04 | 9.19 | 1.86 | 11.08 |
| 2013 | 19,551,678 | 215,407 | 181,112 | 34,295 | 11.02 | 9.26 | 1.75 | 13.70 |
| 2014 | 19,853,880 | 219,991 | 185,956 | 34,035 | 11.08 | 9.37 | 1.71 | 16.68 |
| 2015 | 20,219,111 | 224,269 | 191,737 | 32,532 | 11.09 | 9.48 | 1.61 | 18.58 |
| 2016 | 20,627,237 | 225,022 | 197,313 | 27,709 | 10.91 | 9.57 | 1.34 | 15.62 |
| 2017 | 20,977,089 | 223,630 | 203,636 | 19,994 | 10.66 | 9.71 | 0.95 | 12.29 |
| 2018 | 21,254,926 | 221,542 | 205,426 | 16,116 | 10.42 | 9.66 | 0.76 | 10.40 |
| 2019 | 21,492,056 | 220,002 | 207,002 | 13,000 | 10.24 | 9.63 | 0.60 | 4.05 |
| 2020 | 21,592,035 | 209,671 | 239,685 | –30,014 | 9.71 | 11.10 | –1.39 | 12.50 |
| 2021 | 21,831,949 | 216,260 | 261,369 | –45,109 | 9.91 | 11.97 | –2.07 | 27.14 |
| 2022 | 22,379,312 | 224,433 | 239,119 | –14,686 | 10.03 | 10.68 | –0.65 | |
| 2023 | 22,904,868 | 221,410 | 228,940 | –7,530 | 9.66 | 10 | –0.33 | |
| 2024 | | 224,389 | 228,401 | –4,012 | | | | |
| 2025 | 23,462,518 | 223,978 | 227,036 | –3,058 | | | | |

Note: Births in the table exceed 100% because some Hispanics are counted both by their ethnicity and by their race, giving a higher overall number.

Live Births by Single Race/Ethnicity of Mother
| Race | 2014 | 2015 | 2016 | 2017 | 2018 | 2019 | 2020 | 2021 | 2022 | 2023 | 2024 |
|---|---|---|---|---|---|---|---|---|---|---|---|
| White | 100,837 (45.8%) | 102,549 (45.7%) | 99,344 (44.1%) | 96,280 (43.1%) | 95,868 (43.2%) | 93,590 (42.5%) | 88,080 (42.0%) | 91,223 (42.2%) | 91,763 (40.9%) | 90,118 (40.7%) | 90,531 (40.3%) |
| Black | 53,148 (24.1%) | 53,699 (23.9%) | 48,928 (21.7%) | 49,428 (22.1%) | 48,174 (21.7%) | 47,730 (21.7%) | 45,585 (21.7%) | 45,710 (21.1%) | 47,635 (21.2%) | 44,898 (20.3%) | 42,908 (19.1%) |
| Asian | 7,402 (3.4%) | 7,603 (3.4%) | 7,178 (3.2%) | 7,015 (3.1%) | 6,996 (3.2%) | 7,069 (3.2%) | 6,539 (3.1%) | 6,506 (3.0%) | 6,592 (2.9%) | 6,789 (3.1%) | 7,112 (3.2%) |
| American Indian | 406 (0.2%) | 373 (0.2%) | 237 (0.1%) | 429 (0.2%) | 413 (0.2%) | 400 (0.2%) | 229 (0.1%) | 227 (0.1%) | 231 (0.1%) | 239 (0.1%) | 222 (0.1%) |
| Hispanic (any race) | 61,849 (28.1%) | 64,078 (28.6%) | 65,895 (29.3%) | 67,049 (30.0%) | 67,201 (30.3%) | 68,234 (31.0%) | 66,156 (31.6%) | 69,375 (32.1%) | 74,864 (33.4%) | 75,987 (34.3%) | 79,481 (35.4%) |
| Total | 219,991 (100%) | 224,269 (100%) | 225,022 (100%) | 223,630 (100%) | 221,542 (100%) | 220,002 (100%) | 209,671 (100%) | 216,260 (100%) | 224,433 (100%) | 221,410 (100%) | 224,389 (100%) |

== Languages ==
As of 2010, 73.36% of Florida residents age 5 and older spoke English at home as a primary language, while 19.54% spoke Spanish, 1.84% French Creole (mostly Haitian Creole), 0.60% French and 0.50% Portuguese. In total, 26.64% of Florida's population age 5 and older spoke a mother language other than English. More recent estimates from the U.S. Census Bureau indicate that approximately 30.6% of Florida residents aged five and older spoke a language other than English at home between 2020 and 2024.

Florida's public education system identified more than 200 first languages other than English spoken in the homes of students. In 1990, the League of United Latin American Citizens (LULAC) settled a class action lawsuit against the state Florida Department of Education with a consent decree that required educators to be trained in teaching English for Speakers of Other Languages (ESOL).

Article II, Section 9, of the Florida Constitution provides that "English is the official language of the State of Florida." This provision was adopted in 1988 by a vote following an Initiative Petition.

A Miami accent has developed among persons born and/or raised in and around Miami-Dade County and a few other parts of South Florida. It is more prominent among Hispanics (especially Cuban Americans and other Latino groups, influenced by the Spanish language).

Top Languages in Florida
| Language | Percent of population (2010) |
|---|---|
| English | 73.36% |
| Spanish | 19.54% |
| French Creole (including Haitian and Antillean Creoles) | 1.84% |
| French | 0.60% |
| Portuguese | 0.50% |
| German | 0.42% |
| Tagalog, Vietnamese, Italian (tied) | 0.31% |
| Arabic | 0.22% |
| Chinese | 0.20% |
| Russian | 0.18% |
| Polish | 0.14% |

== Religion ==
Religion in Florida (2014)
1. Protestantism (46.0%)
2. Roman Catholicism (21.0%)
3. Mormonism (1.00%)
4. Jehovah's Witnesses (1.00%)
5. Other Christian (1.00%)
6. No religion (24.0%)
7. Judaism (3.00%)
8. Other religion (3.00%)

Florida residents identify as mostly of various Protestant groups. Roman Catholics make up the single largest denomination in the state. Florida residents' current religious affiliations are shown in the table below:

- Christianity 70%
  - Protestantism 46%
    - Evangelical Protestant 24%
    - Mainline Protestant 14%
    - Historically Black Protestant 8%
  - Catholicism 21%
  - Mormonism 1%
  - Jehovah's Witness 1%
  - Other Christian 1%
- Non-Christian Faiths 6%
  - Judaism 3%
  - Other religion (e.g. Islam, Hinduism, Buddhism, Sikhism) 3%
- Unaffiliated 24%

== Veterans ==
There were 1.6 million veterans in Florida in 2010, representing 8% of the total population. Florida has one of the largest veteran populations in the United States, ranking third nationally behind California and Texas. The U.S. Department of Veterans Affairs suggests there were 1,412,963 veterans in Florida during 2023 with the majority of the veteran population being male, being 1,246,673 male veterans to 166,290 female veterans.

== Homelessness ==
The Florida Council on Homelessness reported that in 2023, the state had 30,809 individuals experiencing homelessness on a single night. Approximately half of this population was unsheltered, not fit for suitable living conditions. According to The Florida Council on Homelessness there is a significant disparity among the Black population being represented in the homelessness population.

== Migration ==
In 2013, most net migrants come from 1) New York, 2) New Jersey, 3) Pennsylvania, and 4) the Midwestern United States; emigration is higher from these same states. For example, about 50,000 moved to New York; but more than 50,000 people moved from New York to Florida. Florida's population growth is influenced by international migration, as of 2021, over 21% of the state's population was foreign-born, with 60.2% being naturalized U.S. citizens. The largest number of international migration residents come from Latin America, making up over 75% of this population.

== Education ==
In 2023, approximately 34.9% of Florida's population aged 25 years and older held a bachelor's degree or higher. This figure is slightly below the national average at 36.2%, while 66.2% students over the age of 3 years and older were enrolled in school, being slightly below the national average at 67.8%. Educational attainment among Florida's adult population has shown a slow increase over the years as in 2023, 33.2% of Florida's population aged 25 and older had earned a bachelor's degree or higher, representing an upward trend in educational attainment, although the increase varies significantly across different counties.
