= Hispanics and Latinos in Florida =

Hispanic and Latino Floridians are residents of the state of Florida who are of Hispanic or Latino ancestry. The statistics in the PEW report show that the justification of the definition of “Hispanic” is based on Spanish language in Latin America (thereby excluding Brazil) or if a person is from Spain, while Latino is based on Latin American origin (including Brazil) disregarding people from Spain or Portugal. The same study presented the findings 27% preferred to identify as “Hispanic” while 18% preferred the term “Latino”. The Census Bureau has changed its framed terminology towards the question since it was first introduced in 1930 as a “Mexican Race” option and it is still changing to this day to become more inclusive and specific to each person who identifies as Hispanic and/or Latino. Latinos in Florida accounted for 5.3 million (8 percent) of the US Latino population. At around 28.5% of the population as of 2017, Cubans are the largest Latino group in Florida. Puerto Ricans are one of the fastest growing Latino groups in Florida, with one out of every five Latinos in the state being of Puerto Rican origin. Cubans and Puerto Ricans together make up almost half of Florida's Latino population. Other sizable Latino groups include South Americans (17.9%), Mexicans (13.5%), Central Americans (10.7%), and Dominicans (4.8%); all other Latinos make up 3.6% in total.

== Demographics ==
According to the Pew Research Center the Latino population of Florida breaks down as follows as of 2011:

Group	Percent of FL Hispanics	Population
Florida Hispanic Population (PEW)	100%	4,790,000
Native-Born Hispanics	54%	2,510,000
Foreign-Born Hispanics	46%	2,280,000
Mexican Origin	14.42%	691,000
Central American	10.82%	518,000
South American	16.77%	803,000
Caribbean	54.95%	2,632,000
Other Hispanic Origin	3.04%	146,000

=== Race ===
12% of all Afro-Latinos in the United States live in the state of Florida. The only states with a larger share of the national Afro-Latino population are California (15%) and New York (23%).

=== LGBT community ===
30% of all LGBT people in the state of Florida are Latinos.

=== Hispanic or Latino by national origin ===
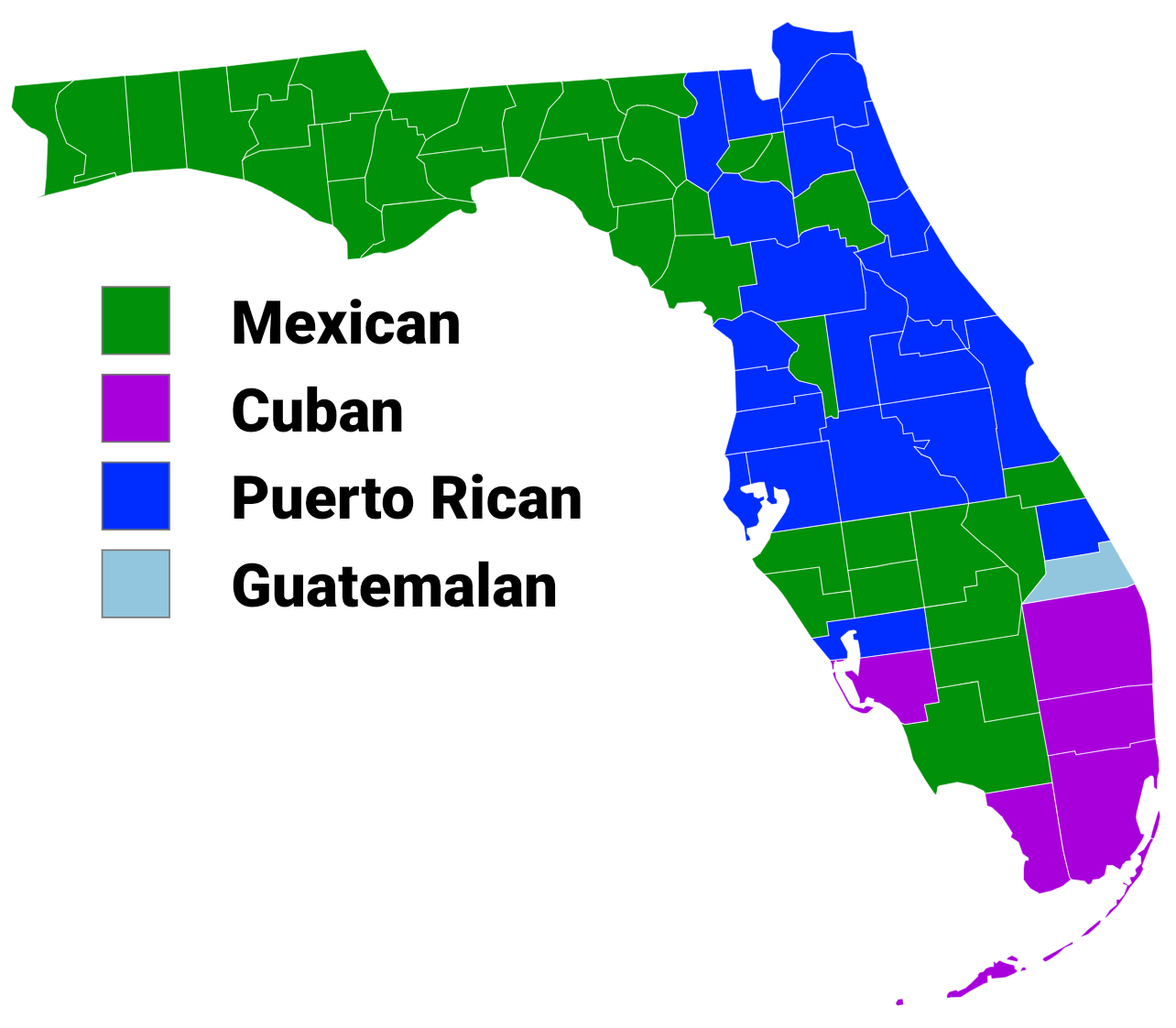
Largest Hispanic ancestry in Florida by county, per the 2020 census

Ancestry by origin	Number	%
(Cuba) Cubans	1,455,289	
(Puerto Rico) Puerto Ricans	1,239,809	
(Mexico) Mexicans	722,134	
(Colombia) Colombians	444,660	
(Venezuela) Venezuelans	380,972	
(Dominican Republic) Dominicans	309,060	
(Guatemala) Guatemalans	174,923	
(Nicaragua) Nicaraguans	171,579	
(Honduras) Hondurans	162,517	
(Peru) Peruvians	142,916	
(Brazil) Brazilians	110,733	
(El Salvador) Salvadorans	96,668	
(Ecuador) Ecuadorians	93,118	
(Spain) Spaniards	85,251	
(Argentina) Argentines	74,099	
(Panama) Panamanians	41,879	
(Chile) Chileans	35,387	
(Costa Rica) Costa Ricans	32,615	
(Uruguay) Uruguayans	19,428	
(Bolivia) Bolivians	17,517	
(Paraguay) Paraguayans	2,291	

== Cubans in Florida ==
Florida boasts the highest population of Cubans in the United States, which is due primarily to the relatively close proximity of Florida to Cuba as well as several political incidents which drove citizens of Cuba to migrate. Since the induction of Fidel Castro as dictator of Cuba in 1959, there have been several distinct waves of immigration from Cuba to Florida. The first of these waves coincided with the rise of Castro, who was a very polarizing figure in the eyes of the Cuban people. Castro's extreme politics led many supporters of the previous government to leave Cuba behind in the wake of the revolution. The mass exodus from Cuba in the 60's on account of Castro's takeover resulted in a growth of 360,000 Cubans from 1960 to 1970, according to the Digital Public Library of America. The second wave was also due to Castro's rule, and occurred after the shutdown of approximately 55,000 businesses in 1968. In the time between 1968 and 1974, another 250,000 Cubans left their home country for the US, most of them coming to Florida. Wave three was again a consequence of Fidel Castro, who in 1980 removed a security detail from the Peruvian embassy due to a conflict which left two guards wounded. The removal of this security detail caused hundreds of Cubans to swarm the embassy in hopes of leaving Cuba. In response to this, Castro opened up the port of El Mariel, and between the months of April and September 1980, 125,000 Cubans left for Florida. Most of the Cubans in Florida reside in Miami. Jacksonville's Cuban population has increased from 2.6% in 1990 to 11.3% in 2020, and continues to grow.

== See also ==
- Cuban migration to Miami
- Floridanos
