= List of metropolitan areas of Florida =

The following is a complete list of the 22 metropolitan areas in Florida, as defined by the United States Office of Management and Budget. The largest, the Miami metropolitan area, is the ninth-largest among metropolitan areas in the U.S. The second-largest metropolitan area in Florida, the Tampa Bay area, is the 17th-largest metropolitan area in the nation.

== Metropolitan areas ==
The following table lists population figures for those metropolitan areas, in rank of population. Population figures are as of the 2024 U.S. Census estimates.

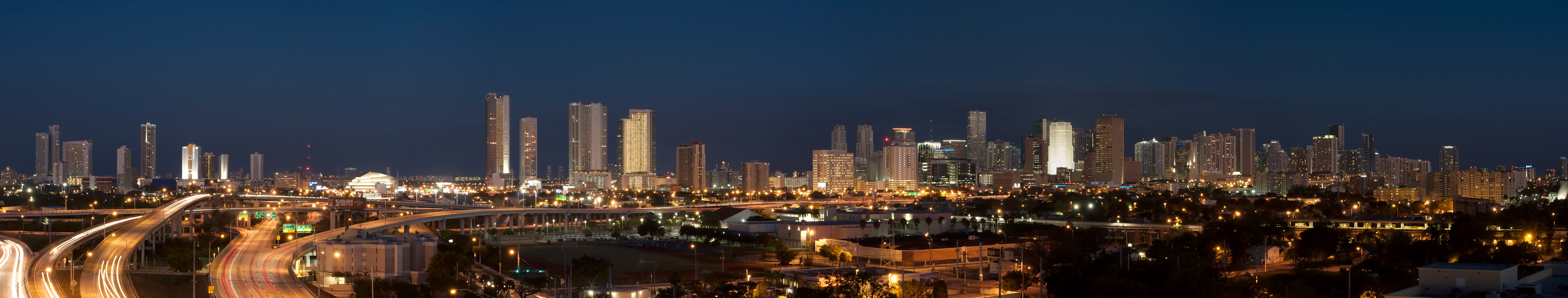
Miami is the main city of the largest metropolitan area in Florida

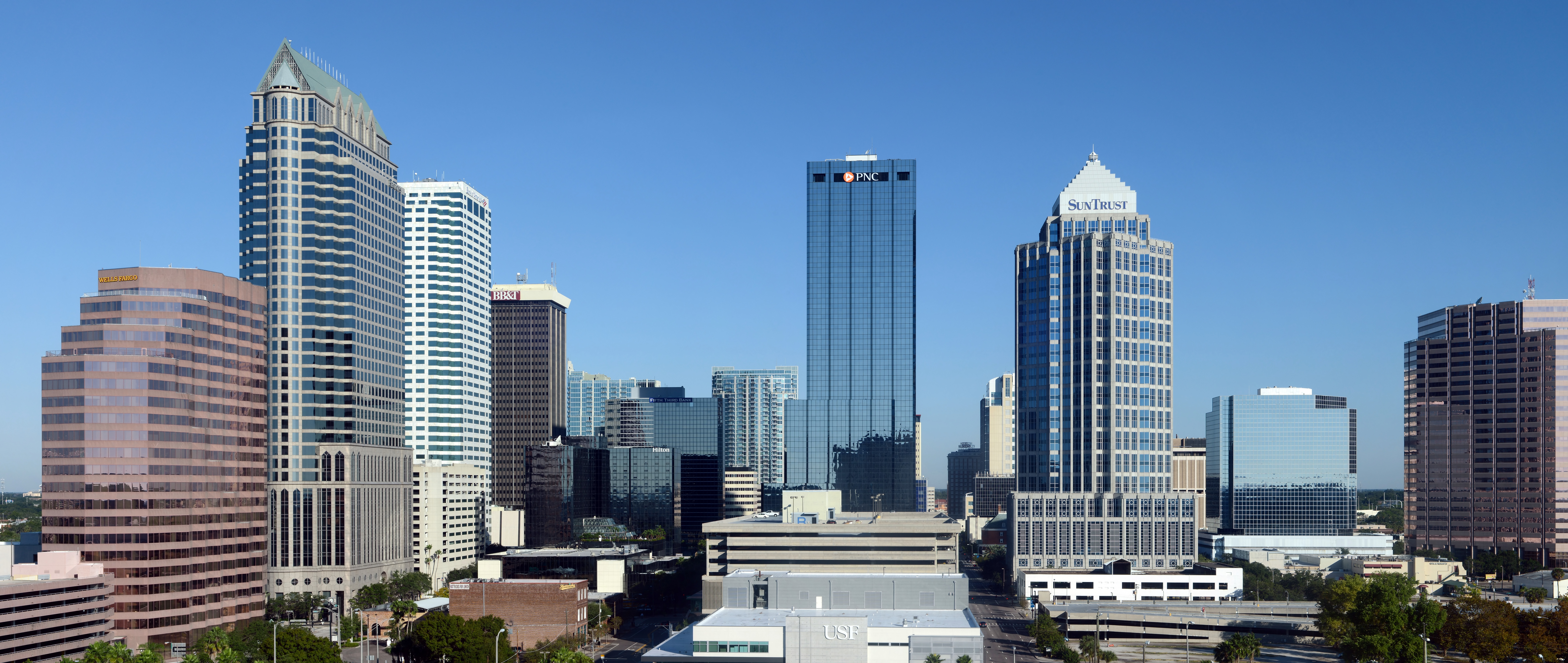
Tampa, part of second-largest metropolitan area

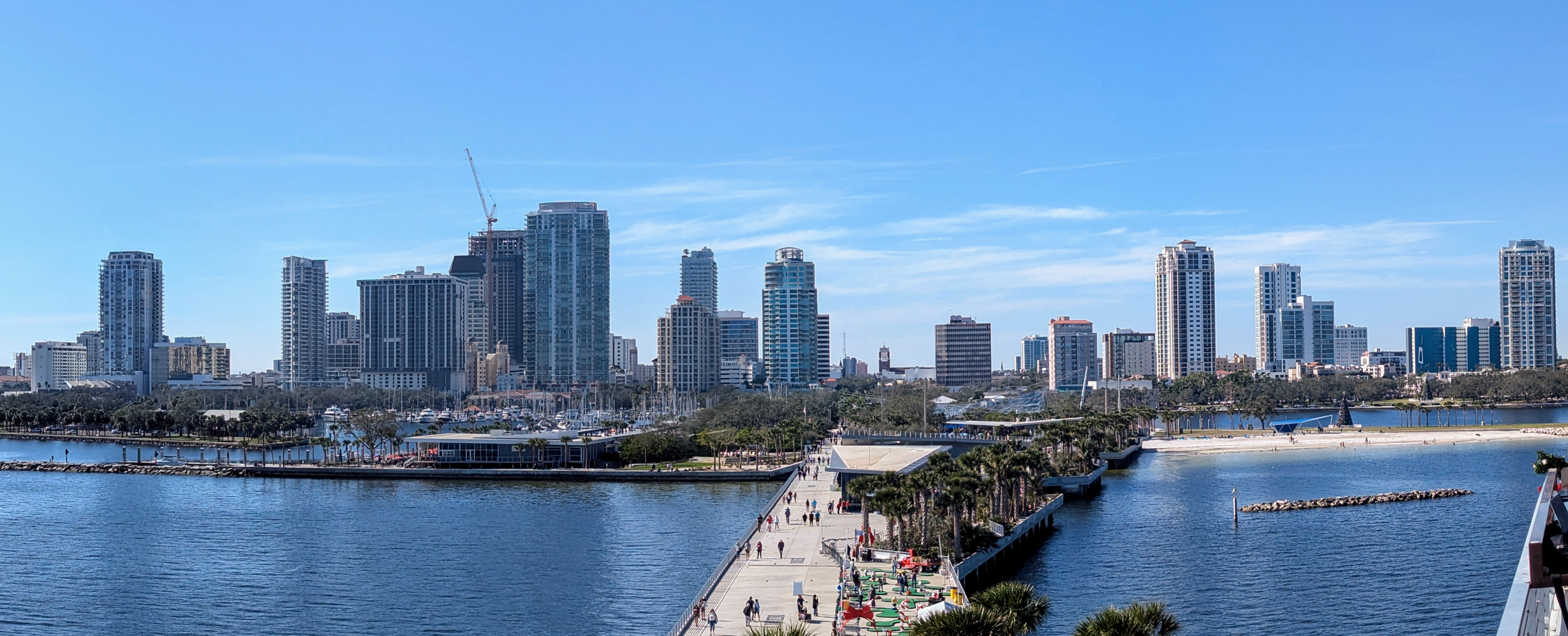
St. Petersburg, part of second-largest metropolitan area

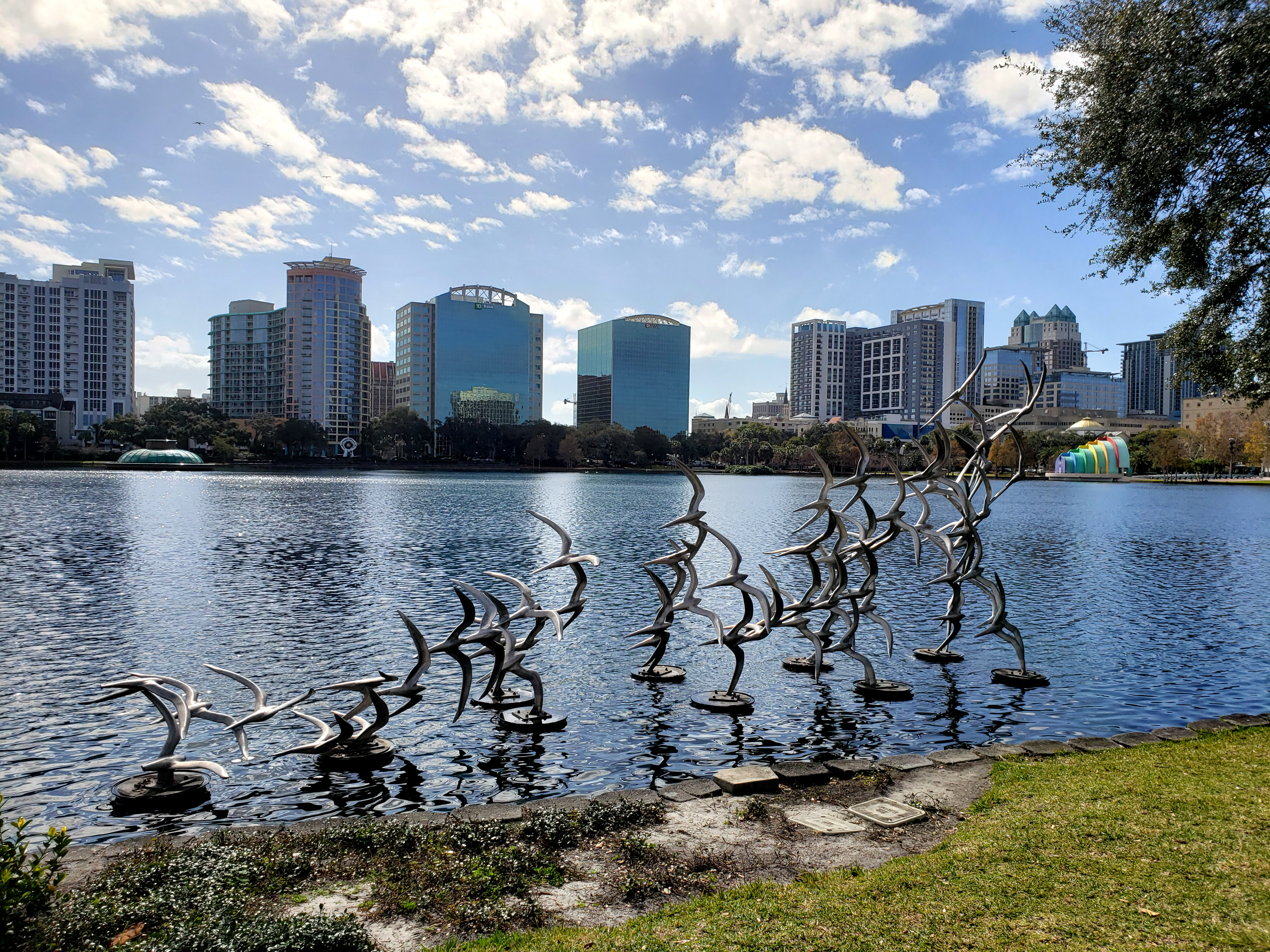
Orlando, Florida, is the main city of third-largest metropolitan area

Florida rank	U.S. rank	Metropolitan area	Population (2024 est.)
1	9	Miami–Fort Lauderdale–West Palm Beach	6,457,988
2	17	Tampa–St. Petersburg–Clearwater	3,424,560
3	21	Orlando–Kissimmee–Sanford	2,940,513
4	38	Jacksonville	1,760,548
5	63	North Port–Bradenton–Sarasota	934,956
6	72	Cape Coral–Fort Myers	860,959
7	75	Lakeland–Winter Haven	852,878
8	83	Deltona–Daytona Beach–Ormond Beach	739,516
9	91	Palm Bay–Melbourne–Titusville	658,447
10	106	Port St. Lucie	556,336
11	107	Pensacola–Ferry Pass–Brent	538,928
12	134	Ocala	428,905
13	135	Naples–Marco Island	416,233
14	141	Tallahassee	397,675
15	157	Gainesville	359,780
16	170	Crestview–Fort Walton Beach–Destin	310,149
17	218	Panama City–Panama City Beach	226,221
18	225	Punta Gorda	212,122
19	257	Sebastian–Vero Beach–West Vero Corridor	172,138
20	263	Homosassa Springs	170,174
21	286	Wildwood–The Villages	154,693
22	348	Sebring	109,778

== See also ==
- Metropolitan statistical area
- List of combined statistical areas
