= Robiskie =

Robiskie is a surname. Notable people with the surname include:

- Andrew Robiskie (born 1989), American football player
- Brian Robiskie (born 1987), American football player
- Terry Robiskie (born 1954), American football player and coach
