= List of people from Lafayette, Louisiana =

This is a list of individuals who are or were natives of, or notable as residents of, or in association with the city of Lafayette, Louisiana, United States.

== Notable residents ==
=== Natives ===
Some of the notable people who were born in Lafayette:

- Danneel Ackles, television actress, One Tree Hill
- Felecia Angelle, anime voice-over actress
- Fernest Arceneaux (deceased), zydeco musician
- Nnamdi Asomugha, NFL defensive back
- Lynn August (deceased), zydeco musician
- Autumn!, rapper
- Paul Bako, catcher in Major League Baseball for the Cincinnati Reds
- Marc Breaux, choreographer of movies such as Mary Poppins, The Sound of Music, and Chitty Chitty Bang Bang
- Jeffery Broussard, zydeco musician
- Buckwheat Zydeco (Stanley Dural Jr., deceased), zydeco musician
- Jefferson Caffery (deceased), former U.S. ambassador
- Mark Carrier, former NFL wide receiver
- Irvin Castille, Negro American League player for the Birmingham Black Barons
- Daniel Cormier, Olympic wrestler and former UFC Light Heavyweight and Heavyweight Champion
- Cupid, R&B singer; known for writing the "Cupid Shuffle"
- Lauren Daigle, Grammy-winning singer
- Walter Davis, triple jump athlete
- Michael Doucet, Cajun musician
- Armand Duplantis, Olympic-champion pole vaulter representing Sweden
- Kevin Faulk, NFL running back
- Carol Fran, (deceased), rhythm and blues singer and pianist
- Ron Guidry, MLB pitcher
- Tre Harris, NFL wide receiver
- Hunter Hayes, country musician
- Jimmy Hayes, former member of the United States House of Representatives from the since disbanded 7th congressional district
- Lionel Hebert, professional golfer
- Alan Jouban, MMA fighter
- Richard Keith, born Keith Thibodeaux, known for playing "Little Ricky" on I Love Lucy
- Angela Kinsey, television actress, The Office
- Lash Leroux, professional wrestler, illustrator for Pro Wrestling Illustrated and other wrestling magazines
- Nghana Lewis, District Court Judge, Division B, 40th Judicial District Court, Louisiana
- Mikie Mahtook, MLB outfielder and first round draft pick; currently plays for the Detroit Tigers
- Gil Meche, MLB pitcher, Kansas City Royals
- Louis J. Michot, member of the Louisiana House of Representatives
- Alfred Mouton, Civil War general
- Malik Nabers, NFL wide receiver
- Ann McBride Norton (1944–2020), activist and business executive
- Bobby Parker (deceased), blues singer and guitarist
- Kim Perrot (1967–1999), WNBA basketball player
- Dustin Poirier, former interim UFC Lightweight Champion
- Addison Rae (born 2000), social media personality, dancer, actress and singer
- Eddy Raven, country singer
- Lil' Buck Sinegal (deceased), zydeco and blues guitarist
- SSGKobe, rapper
- Summrs, rapper
- Joe Walker, zydeco musician
- Brett Weaver, anime voiceover actor; mostly known for his work with ADV Films
- Gus Weill, political consultant, television host, novelist, playwright, poet, born in Lafayette in 1933
- Domanick Williams, NFL running back
- Jessica Zajicek, former PA of Kathy Griffin; starring in Kathy Griffin: My Life on the D-List

=== Residents ===
Other notable current and/or former residents of Lafayette:

- C. C. Adcock, musician, producer
- Royd Anderson, filmmaker
- Kevyn Aucoin (deceased), professional makeup artist
- Ray Authement (born 1928), president of the University of Louisiana at Lafayette, 1974–2008
- Jamie Baldridge (born 1975), visual artist, writer
- Carl W. Bauer (1933–2013), member of both houses of the Louisiana State Legislature; lobbyist for the University of Louisiana at Lafayette, 1990–2010
- Henri Willis Bendel, fashion designer and entrepreneur
- Captain Steven L. Bennett, posthumous Vietnam War Medal of Honor recipient
- Kathleen Blanco, former Louisiana governor
- Roy Bourgeois, priest and founder of human rights group SOA Watch
- Marc Broussard, musician
- James Lee Burke, mystery novelist, Pulitzer Prize nominee
- Kody Chamberlain, comic book writer and artist
- Jermall Charlo, boxer, IBF Junior Middleweight Champion
- Jermell Charlo, boxer, WBC Super Welterweight Champion
- Clifton Chenier (deceased), zydeco music pioneer
- Hollis Conway, Olympic medalist
- Albert H. Crews, astronaut
- Richard Cusimano, historian
- Janet Danahey, a mass murderer
- Charles B. DeBellevue, highest-scoring American flying ace during the Vietnam War
- Jefferson J. DeBlanc, World War II flying ace and Medal of Honor recipient
- Jake Delhomme, NFL quarterback
- David Egan (deceased), musician
- Ernest Gaines, fiction author, Pulitzer Prize nominee
- Deirdre Gogarty, world champion boxer
- Hedwig Gorski, poet and writer
- Amy Guidry, surrealist painter
- Leigh Hennessy, world champion gymnast and movie/TV stuntwoman
- Clay Higgins, member of the U.S. House of Representatives for Louisiana's 3rd congressional district, former reserve deputy marshal of Lafayette known as the "Cajun John Wayne"
- Sammy Kershaw, country & western musician
- Bennett Landreneau, U.S. Army major general
- Ali Landry, former Miss USA, model and actress
- John L. Loos (deceased), American historian; Louisiana State University professor; spent last years in Lafayette, where he died in 2011
- Eugene J. Martin (deceased), visual artist originally from Washington D.C.
- Alex McCool, manager of NASA Space Shuttle Projects Office
- Elizabeth McNulty, Miss Louisiana 2007
- Brian Mitchell, former NFL running back, special teams returner
- RJ Mitte, actor known for playing Walt Jr. on Breaking Bad
- Elemore Morgan, Jr. (deceased), professor and visual artist
- Paul Prudhomme, chef
- Robert Rauschenberg (deceased), artist, National Medal of Arts winner
- Zachary Richard, musician
- George Rodrigue, artist, The Blue Dog
- Chanda Rubin, USTA tennis player
- Clifford Schoeffler, U.S. Air Force general
- Ted Scott (caddie)
- J. Minos Simon, attorney, author, sportsman
- Richard Simmons, exercise guru
- Brandon Stokley, NFL wide receiver
- Warren Storm (deceased), swamp pop singer and drummer
- Daniel Sunjata, film, television, and Tony Award-nominated stage actor
- Sam H. Theriot, Louisiana state representative from Vermilion Parish from 1979 to 1996, subsequently relocated to Lafayette
- Hugh Thompson, Jr., hero of My Lai, helicopter pilot
- John Kennedy Toole (deceased), author of the Pulitzer Prize-winning novel A Confederacy of Dunces
- A. Hays Town, architect
- Javon Walker, NFL wide receiver
- Nathan Williams, zydeco musician
- Tyler James Williams, actor

== Notable local politicians ==
- Page Cortez, District 43 state representative since 2008
- John Malcolm Duhé, Jr. (born 1933), retired U.S. district and appellate court judge
- Joey Durel (born 1953), former mayor-president of Lafayette consolidated government (2004–2016)
- Richard T. Haik (born 1950), United States District Judge for the Western District of Louisiana, based in Lafayette since 1991
- Roderick Miller (deceased), first Republican member of the Louisiana House of Representatives from Lafayette since Reconstruction

== See also ==
- List of University of Louisiana at Lafayette people
- List of people from Louisiana
