= German Coast, Orleans Territory =

Administrative subdivision, 1805–1807

German Coast County, Orleans Territory, sometimes County of the German Coast, was a former civil division of Louisiana that existed from April 10, 1805, until April 14, 1807, during the U.S. Territory of Orleans, pre-statehood period. In 1807, when the county system was replaced with civil parishes, the county was divided into St. John the Baptist and St. Charles parishes. There were, however, still documents referring to "ex-officio sheriff of the County of the German Coast" in 1824.

== See also ==
- German Coast
