= Terry Robiskie =

American football player and coach (born 1954)

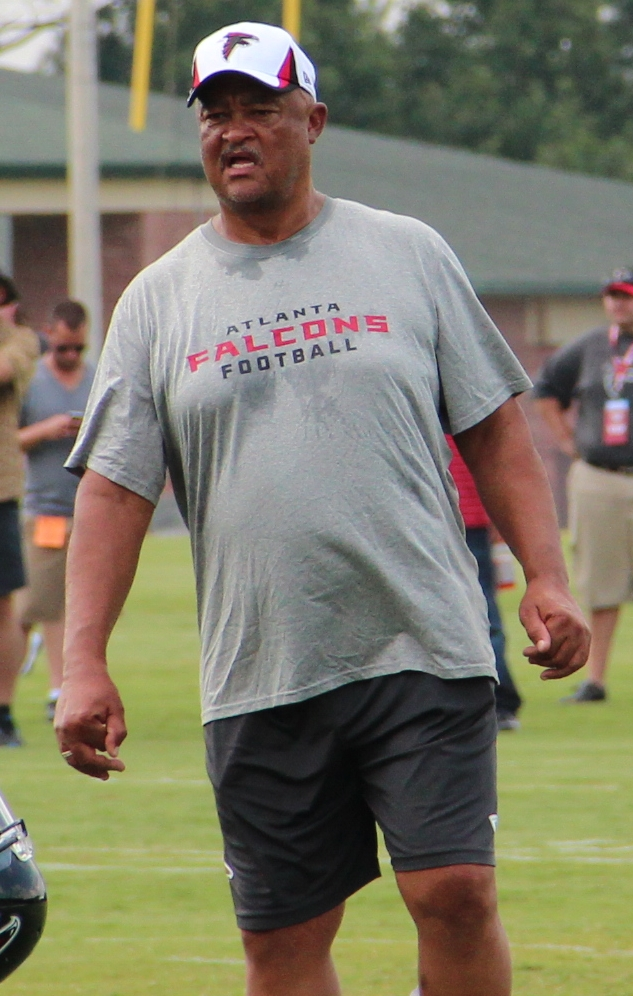
- Robiskie with the Atlanta Falcons in 2013

No. 35, 38
- Position: Running back

Personal information
- Born: November 12, 1954 (age 71); New Orleans, Louisiana, U.S.
- Listed height: 6 ft 1 in (1.85 m)
- Listed weight: 210 lb (95 kg)

Career information
- High school: Second Ward (Edgard, Louisiana)
- College: LSU (1973–1976)
- NFL draft: 1977: 8th round, 223rd overall pick

Career history

Playing
- Oakland Raiders (1977–1979); Miami Dolphins (1980–1981)

Coaching
- Los Angeles Raiders (1982–1984) Special teams assistant; Los Angeles Raiders (1985–1987) Assistant running backs coach; Los Angeles Raiders (1988) Tight ends coach; Los Angeles Raiders (1989–1993) Offensive coordinator; Washington Redskins (1994–1998) Wide receivers coach; Washington Redskins (1999) Passing game coordinator; Washington Redskins (2000) Passing game coordinator & interim head coach; Cleveland Browns (2001–2003) Wide receivers coach; Cleveland Browns (2004) Offensive coordinator & interim head coach; Cleveland Browns (2005–2006) Wide receivers coach; Miami Dolphins (2007) Wide receivers coach; Atlanta Falcons (2008–2015) Wide receivers coach; Tennessee Titans (2016–2017) Offensive coordinator; Buffalo Bills (2018) Wide receivers coach; Jacksonville Jaguars (2019–2020) Running backs coach

Awards and highlights
- As player: First-team All-SEC (1976); As coach: Super Bowl champion (XVIII)

Career NFL statistics
- Rushing attempts: 159
- Rushing yards: 553
- Receptions: 23
- Receiving yards: 147
- Total TDs: 5
- Stats at Pro Football Reference

Head coaching record
- Regular season: 2–6 (.250)
- Coaching profile at Pro Football Reference

Terrance Joseph Robiskie (born November 12, 1954) is an American former professional football player and coach in the National Football League (NFL). He played five seasons as a running back. After his playing career, Robiskie was an assistant coach for the Buffalo Bills, Tennessee Titans, Atlanta Falcons, Miami Dolphins, Cleveland Browns, Washington Redskins, Los Angeles Raiders, and Jacksonville Jaguars.

== Early life and playing career ==
Robiskie was born in New Orleans and was raised in Lucy, Louisiana, a city 25 miles (40 km) west of New Orleans. He attended Second Ward High School in Edgard, Louisiana and was a star quarterback there. After high school, Robiskie went to Louisiana State University, where he was converted to a running back for LSU's football team. During his senior year in 1976, Robiskie was a first-team All-SEC running back. He was the first LSU running back to run for over 200 yards in a single game, gaining 214 yards in 30 attempts against Rice University in 1976. Robiskie was also the first LSU running back to run for over 1,000 yards in a season (1976), and the first LSU running back to run for over 2,500 yards in a career (1973–76).

Robiskie was drafted in the eighth round of the 1977 NFL Draft by the Oakland Raiders. He spent five years in the NFL as a running back with the Raiders (1977–79) and the Miami Dolphins (1980–81), while playing for acclaimed coaches John Madden, Tom Flores, and Don Shula. Robiskie was a role player, rushing for only 553 yards and five touchdowns in five seasons before injury forced his retirement.

== Coaching career ==
=== Los Angeles Raiders ===
Robiskie entered the coaching profession with the Los Angeles Raiders in 1982 as the assistant running backs coach, where he tutored Marcus Allen to two Pro Bowls and two 1,000-yard seasons. Robiskie was the assistant special teams coach for the Raiders from 1985 to 1987, and he tutored tight ends in 1988.

Robiskie was the offensive coordinator for the Raiders from 1989 to 1993. In 1990, the Raiders ranked ninth in the NFL with 126.8 yards rushing per game and quarterback Jay Schroeder ranked sixth in the NFL with a 90.8 passer rating. Two years later, the Raiders ranked 11th in the NFL with 112.1 yards rushing. The following season, the Raiders ranked fifth in the NFL in passing and 13th in total offense as Robiskie helped quarterback Jeff Hostetler pass for 3,242 yards and 14 touchdowns. Robiskie's 12 years with the Raiders included seven playoff stints, four division titles, and a 38–9 victory over the Washington Redskins in Super Bowl XVIII.

=== Washington Redskins ===
In 1994, Robiskie was hired by the Washington Redskins to be their wide receivers coach. He began the 2000 season as passing game coordinator and helped the Redskins rank fifth in the NFC in total offense (337.3 yards per game) and passing (228.0 yards per game). Robiskie helped running back Stephen Davis total 1,318 yards and 11 touchdowns on 332 attempts, including five 100-yard outings. Robiskie concluded the 2000 season as the Redskins' interim head coach for the final three games of the regular season following the departure of Norv Turner. Robiskie's record as head coach was 1–2, including a 20–3 victory over the Arizona Cardinals on December 24.

=== Cleveland Browns ===
Robiskie joined the Browns in 2001 as wide receivers coach and held that role through 2003.

In 2004, Robiskie was named offensive coordinator, but late in the season was named interim head coach, replacing Butch Davis, who resigned under fire for producing the lowest offensive yards, lowest points scored, and most turnovers in the league. Robiskie's record was 1–4 in the interim role. Robiskie interviewed as permanent head coach, but the job went to Romeo Crennel. Robiskie then openly campaigned to remain as an assistant and was named wide receivers coach in February 2005. He was fired in January 2007.

=== Miami Dolphins ===
Shortly after being fired by the Browns, Robiskie was hired as the wide receivers coach for the Miami Dolphins. He was on the same Washington Redskins staff as former Dolphins head coach Cam Cameron from 1994 to 1996.

=== Atlanta Falcons ===
On January 26, 2008, Robiskie was hired by the Atlanta Falcons to be their wide receivers coach. He served in that capacity for eight seasons and was considered influential in the development of homegrown stars Julio Jones and Roddy White into legitimate offensive targets for Matt Ryan. Robiskie's contract with the Falcons was not renewed after the 2015 season.

=== Tennessee Titans ===
On January 18, 2016, Robiskie was hired by the Tennessee Titans to be their offensive coordinator under new head coach Mike Mularkey. His contract with the Titans was not renewed after the 2017 season.

=== Buffalo Bills ===
On February 14, 2018, Robiskie was hired by the Buffalo Bills to be their wide receivers coach. He was fired after one season on January 2, 2019.

=== Jacksonville Jaguars ===
On January 16, 2019, Robiskie was hired by the Jacksonville Jaguars to be their running backs coach.

=== Head coaching record ===
Team	Year	Regular season					Postseason			
Team	Year	Won	Lost	Ties	Win %	Finish	Won	Lost	Win %	Result
WAS*	2000	1	2	0	.333	4th in NFC East	–	–	–	–
CLE*	2004	1	4	0	.200	3rd in AFC North	–	–	–	–
Total		2	6	0	.250		–	–	–	–

* – Interim head coach

== Personal life ==
Robiskie and his wife, Cynthia, have three sons: Brian, Andrew, and Kyle.

Brian was an NFL wide receiver drafted in the second round (36th overall) by the Cleveland Browns in the 2009 NFL draft.

Andrew was undrafted in the 2013 NFL draft, but signed with the Oakland Raiders as a center in the 2013 offseason.

Kyle was a wide receiver for the Western Illinois University Leatherbacks from 2010 to 2013.
