= Andrew Robiskie =

American football player (born 1989)

No. 66
- Position: Center

Personal information
- Born: May 18, 1989 (age 37); Los Angeles, California, U.S.
- Listed height: 6 ft 1 in (1.85 m)
- Listed weight: 297 lb (135 kg)

Career information
- High school: Chagrin Falls (OH)
- College: Western Illinois
- NFL draft: 2013: undrafted

Career history
- Oakland Raiders (2013)*
- * Offseason or practice squad member only

Andrew Robiskie (born May 18, 1989) is an American former football center. He played college football at Western Illinois. He is the son of former NFL running back Terry Robiskie, the younger brother of former NFL wide receiver Brian Robiskie and the older brother of former Western Illinois Leathernecks wide receiver Kyle Robiskie.

== Professional career ==
Pre-draft measurables
Height	Weight	Arm length	Hand span	40-yard dash	10-yard split	20-yard split	20-yard shuttle	Three-cone drill	Vertical jump	Broad jump	Bench press
6 ft 1 1/4 in (1.86 m)	297 lb (135 kg)	31 5/8 in (0.80 m)	9 1/4 in (0.23 m)	5.47 s	1.89 s	3.11 s	4.84 s	8.09 s	23.5 in (0.60 m)	8 ft 0 in (2.44 m)	21 reps
All values from Pro Day

On May 14, 2013, he signed with the Oakland Raiders as an undrafted free agent. On August 25, 2013, he was waived by the Raiders.
