= Schexnayder =

Surname

Schexnayder (/ʃeɪksˈniːdər/) is a surname most commonly found in the U.S. state of Louisiana. It is derived from the German surname Scheckschneider, probably referring to a maker of jackets and jerkins.

== United States ==
The first Schexnayder to settle in Louisiana, Henry Albert Schexnayder, arrived in the 1720s and settled in what was called the "German Coast" (now St. Charles Parish).

Notable individuals with the surname include:

- Anthony Schexnayder (born 1968), 4-year Letterman for UCLA varsity football team
- Calvin Schexnayder (born 1969), American arena football player
- Charlotte Tillar Schexnayder (1923–2020), American newspaper editor and politician
- Clay Schexnayder (born 1969), Louisiana politician
- Maurice Schexnayder (1895–1981), American Roman Catholic prelate
- Irving "Boo" Schexnayder (born 1961), noted coach and educator

=== One departure from France and two Arrivals in Louisiana ===
A Scheckschneider family, consisting of Hans Rhinhart, Catherine, and their two children left L’Orient, France aboard the La Garonne in January 1721. Several on board were taken ill. Their son Jacob was one of the sixteen who were left in Brest, France because they were too ill for the voyage. Professor J. Hanno Deiler mistakenly says that Henry Albert Schexnayder is the brother of Jacob. A 1768 document provides the names of the parents of Henry Albert Schexnayder.

Only two Schexnayder families left records in Louisiana.

An undated (likely post-1732) list of inhabitants of the German Coast (St Charles Parish) shows Henry Albert Scheckschneider lives next door to Bernard Wick, his father-in-law on the west bank of the Mississippi River.

The New Orleans Catholic Church has records for two Schexnayder families:

1. A record of the marriage on 26 June 1742 of Hanz Georg Schscchneider, son of Hanz Schscchneider and Anne Marie Hessin, and Catherine Antonia.

2. Records of the baptisms of Albert Schscchneider and Marie Magdelaine Wich children: Catherinne, Jean George, Jean Henry, Marie Lucie and Marie Josephe.

=== First Family in Louisiana ===
Glenn Conrad records sixteen entries about Henry Albert Schexnayder in his book "Civil Records of St Charles Parish". Henry's first wife Catherine dies before March 5, 1767. Henry marries Marainne Edelmeier, March 5, 1767. Henry dies January 4, 1776. His children from his first marriage are: Andre, Henry Albert, George, Ambroise, Jean Baptiste, Margaite, Catherine, Josetta and Julianne. The distribution of Henry's assets is dated April 20, 1776. After Marainne Edelmeier passes the distribution of her assets is dated November 15, 1892. Henry and Marainne had one son Epiphany. Among Marainne's effects is Henry and Marainne marriage Record. The marriage record states that "Henry Schexnayder native of Brussels on Brabant was the son of Simon Schexnayder and Anne Marie Vasdray".

Calendar of Louisiana Colonial Documents, February 7, 1769

"Sale: Habitation of the late Belsom made to the highest bidder following Mass, notice been posted on the church door in the usual manner. Albert Scgchneider purchased the property for 610 livres payable in six months. Cover endorsement names to purchaser as "Seicheneidre." Signed by D'arensbourg."

Hanno Deiler's book documents D'arensbourg's significant community contributions.

=== Louisiana heritage ===
Schexnayder House at 1681 Pelican Drive in Iberville Parish was listed on the National Register of Historic Places in 1989.

Olidé P. Schexnayder (1871 - 1944) was a photographer in Edgard, Louisiana until he switched careers and became an optician. The Louisiana State Museum has several of his photographs in their collection.

There is a Schexnayder's Supermarket in Vacherie, Louisiana. Schexnayder Meats is a meat purveyor in St. Charles Parish.
