= Brian Robiskie =

American football player (born 1987)

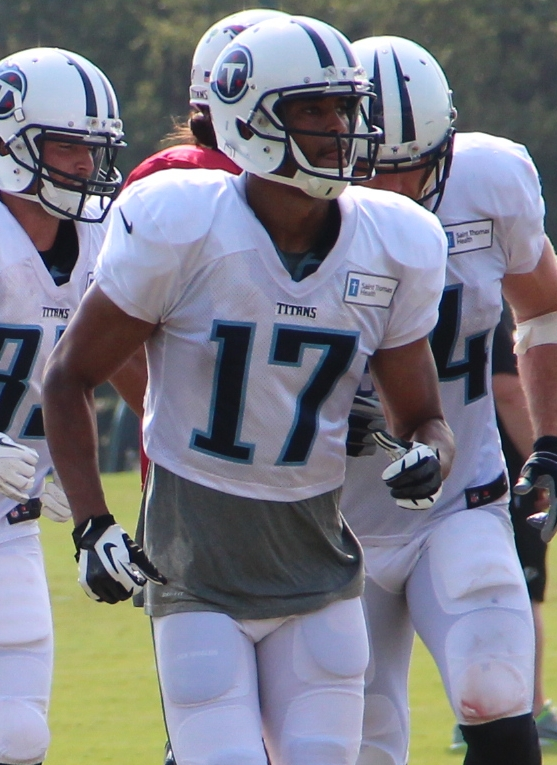
- Robiskie with the Tennessee Titans in 2014

No. 80, 87
- Position: Wide receiver

Personal information
- Born: December 3, 1987 (age 38); Los Angeles, California, U.S.
- Listed height: 6 ft 4 in (1.93 m)
- Listed weight: 212 lb (96 kg)

Career information
- High school: Chagrin Falls (Chagrin Falls, Ohio)
- College: Ohio State (2005–2008)
- NFL draft: 2009: 2nd round, 36th overall pick

Career history
- Cleveland Browns (2009–2011); Jacksonville Jaguars (2011–2012); Detroit Lions (2012); Atlanta Falcons (2013); Tennessee Titans (2014)*
- * Offseason or practice squad member only

Career NFL statistics
- Receptions: 43
- Receiving yards: 485
- Receiving touchdowns: 4
- Stats at Pro Football Reference

Brian Anthony Robiskie (born December 3, 1987) is an American former professional football player who was a wide receiver in the National Football League (NFL). He was selected by the Cleveland Browns in the second round of the 2009 NFL draft. He played college football for the Ohio State Buckeyes.

Robiskie was also a member of the Jacksonville Jaguars, Detroit Lions, Atlanta Falcons, and Tennessee Titans.

== Early life ==
Robiskie was born in Los Angeles, California, and grew up in the Cleveland, Ohio area, where his father was a Cleveland Browns assistant coach. He attended Chagrin Falls High School, where he set numerous school records as a wide receiver.

== College career ==
Robiskie played college football at Ohio State University. He saw little playing time in his freshman and sophomore season with the Buckeyes, but caught the winning touchdown pass in Ohio State's annual rivalry game with Michigan in 2006, and was named a starter his junior season. His performance in the 2007 season helped the Buckeyes advance to the 2008 BCS National Championship Game. Robiskie's receptions and yards were down in the 2008 season with new freshman quarterback Terrelle Pryor at the helm, but he was still a highly touted prospect coming into the 2009 NFL draft.

== Professional career ==
Pre-draft measurables
| Height | Weight | Arm length | Hand span | 40-yard dash | 10-yard split | 20-yard split | 20-yard shuttle | Three-cone drill | Vertical jump |
|---|---|---|---|---|---|---|---|---|---|
| 6 ft 2 7/8 in (1.90 m) | 209 lb (95 kg) | 31 1/2 in (0.80 m) | 9 5/8 in (0.24 m) | 4.52 s | 1.50 s | 2.57 s | 4.19 s | 6.72 s | 37.5 in (0.95 m) |
All values from NFL Combine/Pro Day

The Cleveland Browns selected Robiskie in the second round of the 2009 NFL draft, the 36th overall pick. On November 1, 2011, Robiskie was waived by the Browns in order to clear a roster slot to sign running back Thomas Clayton.

Robiskie was claimed off waivers by the Jacksonville Jaguars on November 2, 2011, and was released on September 10, 2012.

Robiskie was signed by the Detroit Lions on October 24, 2012, and appeared in 6 games for them. He was released by the Lions on April 8, 2013, re-signed on April 15, and cut again by the Lions on June 24.

Robiskie was signed by the Atlanta Falcons on October 10, 2013, following a season-ending injury to Julio Jones. He was released by the team on November 26.

Robiskie signed with the Tennessee Titans on May 2, 2014. He was subsequently released by the Tennessee Titans on August 29, 2014.

=== NFL statistics ===
Robiskie's career NFL statistics, through 2013, are:

| | | Receiving | | | | | |
| Season | Team | GP | Rec | Yds | Avg | Long | TD |
|---|---|---|---|---|---|---|---|
| 2009 | CLE | 11 | 7 | 106 | 15.1 | 43 | 0 |
| 2010 | CLE | 14 | 29 | 310 | 10.7 | 46T | 3 |
| 2011 | CLE | 6 | 3 | 25 | 8.3 | 14 | 0 |
| 2011 | JAX | 0 | 0 | 0 | 0 | 0 | 0 |
| 2012 | JAX | 0 | 0 | 0 | 0 | 0 | 0 |
| 2012 | DET | 6 | 4 | 44 | 11.0 | 21 | 1 |
| 2013 | ATL | 1 | 0 | 0 | 0 | 0 | 0 |
| Career | | 38 | 43 | 485 | 11.3 | 46T | 4 |

== Personal life ==
Robiskie is the son of former NFL running back Terry Robiskie, and the older brother of former Western Illinois Leathernecks Andrew Robiskie and Kyle Robiskie.
