= Pleasure Bend, Louisiana =

- Unincorporated community
- Location within Louisiana Location within the United States
- Coordinates: 29°55′14″N 90°38′45″W
- Country: United States
- State: Louisiana
- Parish: St. John the Baptist

Area
  - Total: 4.228 sq mi (10.95 km^{2})
  - Land: 4.144 sq mi (10.73 km^{2})
  - Water: 0.084 sq mi (0.22 km^{2})
- Elevation: 0 ft (0 m)

Population (2020)
  - Total: 212
  - Density: 51.2/sq mi (19.8/km^{2})
- Time zone: UTC-6 (Central (CST))
  - Summer (DST): UTC-5 (CDT)
- Area code: 985
- GNIS feature ID: 2583545

Pleasure Bend is an unincorporated community and census-designated place in St. John the Baptist Parish, Louisiana, United States. Its population was 250 as of the 2010 census. In 2020, its population declined to 212.

== Geography ==
According to the U.S. Census Bureau, the community has an area of 4.228 square miles (10.95 km^{2}); 4.144 square miles (10.73 km^{2}) of its area is land, and 0.084 square miles (0.22 km^{2}) is water.

== Demographics ==
Historical population
Census	Pop.	Note	%±
2010	250		—
2020	212		−15.2%
U.S. Decennial Census

Pleasure Bend first appeared as a census designated place in the 2010 U.S. census.

Pleasure Bend CDP, Louisiana – Racial and ethnic composition Note: the US Census treats Hispanic/Latino as an ethnic category. This table excludes Latinos from the racial categories and assigns them to a separate category. Hispanics/Latinos may be of any race.
Race / Ethnicity (NH = Non-Hispanic)	Pop 2010	Pop 2020	% 2010	% 2020
White alone (NH)	234	187	93.60%	88.21%
Black or African American alone (NH)	6	6	2.40%	2.83%
Native American or Alaska Native alone (NH)	1	1	0.40%	0.47%
Asian alone (NH)	0	0	0.00%	0.00%
Native Hawaiian or Pacific Islander alone (NH)	0	0	0.00%	0.00%
Other race alone (NH)	0	0	0.00%	0.00%
Mixed race or Multiracial (NH)	1	10	0.40%	4.72%
Hispanic or Latino (any race)	8	8	3.20%	3.77%
Total	250	212	100.00%	100.00%

Pleasure Bend first appeared as a census designated place in the 2010 U.S. census. As of the 2020 United States census, there were 212 people, 101 households, and 47 families residing in the CDP.
