= Welcome, St. John the Baptist Parish, Louisiana =

Welcome, Louisiana
- Unincorporated community
- Location within Louisiana Location within the United States
- Coordinates: 30°03′35″N 90°35′28″W
- Country: United States
- State: Louisiana
- Parish: St. John the Baptist
- Elevation: 16 ft (4.9 m)
- Time zone: UTC-6 (Central (CST))
  - Summer (DST): UTC-5 (CDT)
- Area code: 985
- GNIS feature ID: 1629338

Welcome is an unincorporated community in St. John the Baptist Parish, Louisiana, United States. The community is located near the east bank of the Mississippi River between Garyville and Reserve.
