= Lucy, Louisiana =

Unincorporated community in Louisiana

- Unincorporated community
- Location within Louisiana Location within the United States
- Coordinates: 30°2′48″N 90°30′27″W
- Country: United States
- State: Louisiana
- Parish: St. John the Baptist
- Elevation: 13 ft (4.0 m)
- Time zone: UTC-6 (Central (CST))
  - Summer (DST): UTC-5 (CDT)
- ZIP code: 70049
- Area code: 985
- GNIS feature ID: 1627580
- FIPS code: 22-46405

Lucy is an unincorporated community in St. John the Baptist Parish, in the U.S. state of Louisiana. The community is located less than 2 miles (3.2 kilometres) northwest of Gypsy and 3 miles (4.8 kilometres) east of Edgard.

== Le Meschacébé ==
Between 1853 and 1942 a local newspaper was published containing legal notices, announcements and ads for local businesses. The newspaper was named after the French spelling of the word "Mississippi". What made this newspaper unique was that it was written in the local Kouri-Vini dialect.

== German coast stockades ==
Around 1722 German settlers migrated to this area and named it Karlstein. The settlers built several palisades to protect their families from Native American attacks. The other four locations have never been found.
