= Louisiana district courts =

The state of Louisiana has 42 district courts, with each serving at least one parish.

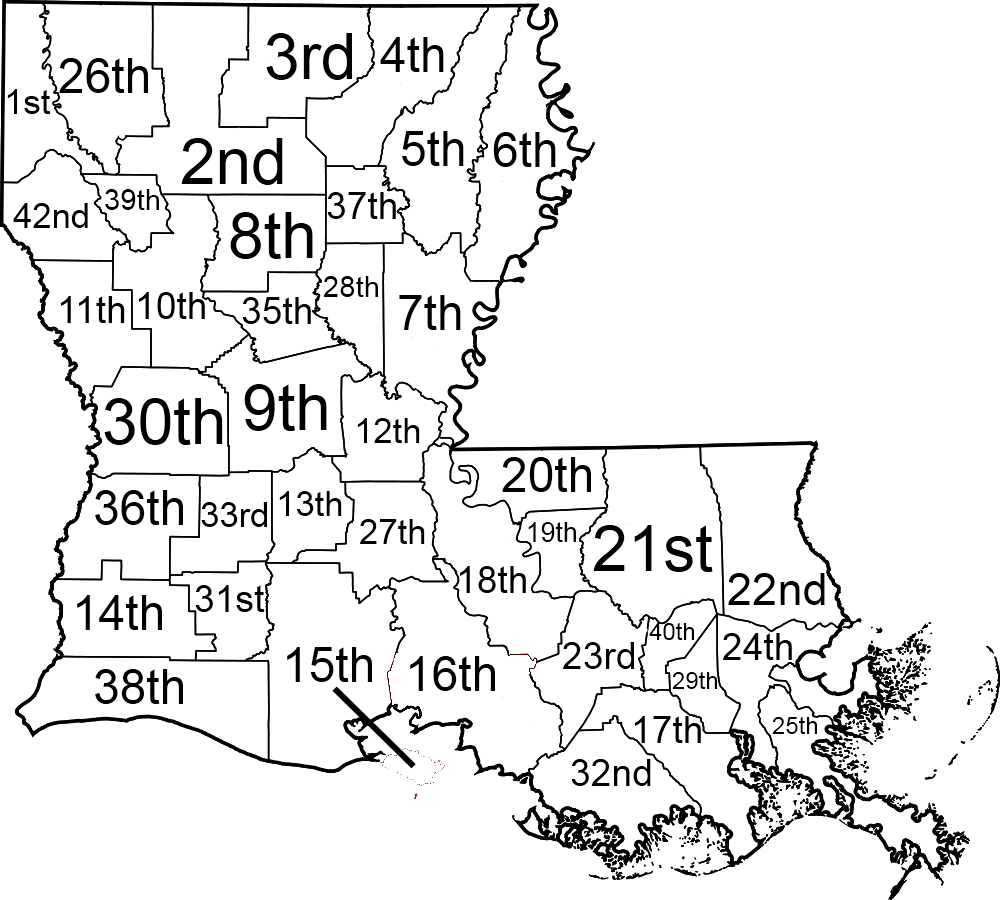
Map showing Louisiana judicial districts

== District 1 ==
Parish Served: Caddo Parish

District Seat: Caddo Parish Courthouse (Shreveport, LA)

Current Judges
Title	Name	Section	Division	Type	Party	Term
Chief Judge	Ramona Emanuel	1	B	Criminal	Democrat	1995-
District Judge	Karelia R. Stewart	1	D	Domestic	Democrat	2014-
District Judge	John Mosely Jr.	1	G	Criminal	Democrat	1995-
District Judge	Ramon Lafitte	1	J	Civil	Democrat	2009-
District Judge	Christopher T. Victory	2	C	Criminal	Republican	2021-
District Judge	Brady D. O'Callaghan	2	H	Civil	Republican	2013-
District Judge	Edwin H. Byrd III	2	I	Domestic	Republican	2022-
District Judge	Donald E. Hathaway Jr.	3	A	Criminal	Republican	2021-
District Judge	Michael A. Pitman	3	E	Civil	Republican	2003-
District Judge	Katherine C. Dorroh	3	F	Domestic	Republican	2013-
District Judge	Erin Leigh Waddell Garrett	3	K	Criminal	Republican	2015-

== District 2 ==
Parishes served: Claiborne Parish, Bienville Parish, Jackson Parish

District Seats: Claiborne Parish Courthouse (Homer, LA), Bienville Parish Courthouse (Arcadia, LA), Jackson Parish Courthouse (Jonesboro, LA)

Current Judges
Title	Name	Division	Duty Station	Party	Term
District Judge	Walter E. May Jr.	A	Claiborne Parish	Republican	2021-
District Judge	William "Rick" Warren	B	Jackson Parish	Republican	2021-
Chief Judge	C. Glenn Fallin	C	Bienville Parish	Independent	2000-

== District 3 ==
Parishes served: Union Parish, Lincoln Parish

District Seats: Union Parish Courthouse (Farmerville, LA), Lincoln Parish Courthouse (Ruston, LA)

Current Judges
Title	Name	Division	Party	Term
District Judge	Monique B. Clement	A	Republican	2021-
District Judge	Thomas W. "Tommy" Rogers Sr.	B	Republican	2015-
Chief Judge	Bruce E. Hampton	C	Republican	2018-

== District 4 ==
Parishes Served: Morehouse Parish, Ouachita Parish

District Seats: Morehouse Parish Courthouse (Bastrop, LA), Ouachita Parish Courthouse (Monroe, LA)

Current Judges
Title	Name	Section	Division	Type	Party	Term
District Judge	B. Scott Leehy	1	A	Civil	Republican	2006-
District Judge	Sharon I. Marchman		B	Juvenile/Drug Court	Republican	2000-
District Judge	J. Wilson Rambo	3	C	Civil	Independent	2003-
District Judge	H. Stephens Winters	3	D	Criminal	Republican	2004-
District Judge	Walter M. Caldwell IV	4	E	Criminal	Republican	2020-
District Judge	C. Wendell Manning	1	F	Criminal	Republican	2003-
District Judge	Frederick D. Jones	5	G	Civil	Democrat	2021-
Chief Judge	Larry D. Jefferson	2	H	Criminal	Democrat	2015-
District Judge	Felecia Williams	5	I	Criminal		
District Judge	Robert C. Johnson	2	J	Civil	Democrat	2008-
District Judge	Jefferson "Jeff" Joyce	4	K	Civil	Independent	2023-

== District 5 ==
Parishes Served: Franklin Parish, Richland Parish, West Carroll Parish

District Seats: Franklin Parish Courthouse (Winnsboro, LA), Richland Parish Courthouse (Rayville, LA), West Carroll Parish Courthouse (Oak Grove, LA)

Current Judges
Title	Name	Division	Party	Term
Chief Judge	John Clay Hamilton	A	Republican	2018-
District Judge	Will Rhymes Barham	B	Republican	2009-
District Judge	Stephen G. Dean	C	Republican	2017-

== District 6 ==
Parishes Served: East Carroll Parish, Madison Parish, Tensas Parish

District Seats: East Carroll Parish Courthouse (Lake Providence, LA), Madison Parish Courthouse (Tallulah, LA), Tensas Parish Courthouse (St. Joseph, LA)

Current Judges
Title	Name	Division	Party	Term
Chief Judge	Laurie Brister	B	No Party	2019-
District Judge	Angela Claxton	A	Democrat	2020-

== District 7 ==
Parishes Served: Catahoula Parish, Concordia Parish

District Seats: Catahoula Parish Courthouse (Harrisonburg, LA), Concordia Parish Courthouse (Vidalia, LA)

Current Judges
Title	Name	Division	Party	Term
Chief Judge	John Reeves	B	Democrat	2015-
District Judge	Joseph A. “Joey” Boothe	A		2026

== District 8 ==
Parish Served: Winn Parish

District Seat: Winn Parish Courthouse (Winnfield, LA)

Current Judge
Title	Name	Party	Term
Chief Judge	Anastasia "Staci" Wiley	Democrat	2021-

== District 9 ==
Parish Served: Rapides Parish

District Seat: Rapides Parish Courthouse (Alexandria, LA)

Current Judges
Title	Name	Election Section	Division	Party	Term
Chief Judge	Patricia E. Koch	2	E	Democrat	2006-
District Judge	Monique F. Rauls	1	A	Democrat	2015-
District Judge	George C. Metoyer, Jr.	1	F	Democrat	1992-
District Judge	Thomas M. Yeager	2	B		1999-
District Judge	Mary L. Doggett	2	C	Democrat	2008-
District Judge	John C. Davidson	2	D	Democrat	
District Judge	Greg Beard	2	G	Republican	2015-

== District 10 ==
Parishes Served: Natchitoches Parish

District Seat: Natchitoches Parish Courthouse (Natchitoches, LA)

Current Judges
Title	Name	Division	Party	Term
Chief Judge	Desirée Dyess	A	Democrat	2015-
District Judge	Lala Sylvester	B	Democrat	2015-

== District 11 ==
Parish Served: Sabine Parish

District Seat: Sabine Parish Courthouse (Many, LA)

Current Judge
Title	Name	Party	Term
Chief Judge	Stephen B. Beasley	Independent	1995-

== District 12 ==
Parish Served: Avoyelles Parish

District Seat: Avoyelles Parish Courthouse (Marksville, LA)

Current Judges
Title	Name	Division	Party	Term
Chief Judge	William J. Bennett	B	Democrat	1996-
District Judge	Kerry Spruill	A	Democrat	2015-

== District 13 ==
Parish Served: Evangeline Parish

District Seat: Evangeline Parish Courthouse (Ville Platte, LA)

Current Judges
Title	Name	Division	Party	Term
Chief Judge	Chuck R. West	B	Democrat	2015-
District Judge	Gary J. Ortego	A	Democrat	2015-

== District 14 ==
Parish Served: Calcasieu Parish

District Seat: Calcasieu Parish Judicial Center (Lake Charles, LA)

Current Judges
Title	Name	Section	Division	Type	Party	Term
Chief Judge	Clayton Davis	2	B		Republican	2008-
District Judge	Lilynn A. Cutrer	1/3	I	Family & Juevenile	Democrat	1999-
District Judge	Sharon Wilson	1	F		Democrat	2014-
District Judge	Ronald Ware	1	H		Democrat	2008-
District Judge	Guy E. Bradberry	2	C	Family & Juvenile	Democrat	2003-
District Judge	Robert L. Wyatt	2	D		Democrat	2002-
District Judge	G. Michael Canaday	2	G		Independent	2000-
District Judge	William Mitchell Redd	3	A	Family & Juvenile	Republican	2015-
District Judge	David Ritchie	3	E		Republican	2003-

== District 15 ==
Parishes Served: Acadia Parish, Lafayette Parish, Vermilion Parish

District Seats: Acadia Parish Courthouse (Crowley, LA), Lafayette Parish Courthouse (Lafayette, LA), Vermilion Parish Courthouse (Abbeville, LA)

Current Judges
Title	Name	Section	Division	Duty Station	Party	Term
Chief Judge	Marilyn C. Castle	3	L	Lafayette Parish	Republican	1999-
District Judge	Jules Edwards, III	1	B	Acadia Parish, Lafayette Parish	Independent	1992-
District Judge	Edward D. Rubin	1	D	Acadia Parish, Lafayette Parish	Democrat	1993-
District Judge	Michelle Meaux Breaux	2	E	Lafayette Parish	Democrat	2015-
District Judge	David Blanchet	3	H	Lafayette Parish	Republican	2003-
District Judge	Thomas Duplantier	3	I	Lafayette Parish	Independent	1993-
District Judge	Patrick Louis Michot	3	K	Lafayette Parish	Republican	1991-
District Judge	"Charlie" Fitzgerald	3	M	Lafayette Parish	Republican	2015-
District Judge	John D. Trahan	4	A	Acadia Parish	Democrat	1997-
District Judge	David M. Smith	4	F	Acadia Parish	Democrat	2015-
District Judge	Kristian Earles	4	J	Acadia Parish	Democrat	2002-
District Judge	Edward B. Broussard	5	C	Vermilion Parish	Democrat	2008-
District Judge	Laurie A. Hulin	5	G	Vermilion Parish	Democrat	2015-

== District 16 ==
Parishes Served: Iberia Parish, St. Martin Parish, St. Mary Parish

District Seats: Iberia Parish Courthouse (New Iberia, LA), St. Martin Courthouse (St. Martinville, LA), St. Mary Courthouse (Franklin, LA)

Current Judges
Title	Name	Section	Division	Party	Term
Chief Judge	Vincent J. Borne	2	C	Democrat	2013-
District Judge	Curtis Sigur	1	G	Democrat	2015-
District Judge	Lori A. Landry	1	H	Democrat	2002-
District Judge	Anthony Thibodeaux	2	A	Republican	2015-
District Judge	Paul deMahy	2	B	Republican	1986-
District Judge	Lewis H. Pitman, Jr.	2	D	Republican	2016-
District Judge	Keith Comeaux	2	E	Independent	2001-
District Judge	Gregory P. Aucoin	2	F	Republican	2015-

== District 17 ==
Parish Served: Lafourche Parish

District Seat: Lafourche Parish Courthouse (Thibodaux, LA)

Current Judges
Title	Name	Division	Party	Term
Chief Judge	John E. Leblanc	A	Independent	1999-
District Judge	Steven Michael Miller	B	Republican	2015-
District Judge	Walter I. Lanier, III	C	Democrat	2002-
District Judge	Christopher Boudreaux	D	Republican	2015-
District Judge	F. Hugh Larose	E	Democrat	2002-

== District 18 ==
Parishes Served: Iberville Parish, Pointe Coupee Parish, West Baton Rouge Parish

District Seats: Iberville Parish Courthouse (Plaquemine, LA), Pointe Coupee Courthouse (New Roads, LA), West Baton Rouge Courthouse (Port Allen, LA)

Current Judges
Title	Name	Section	Division	Duty Station	Party	Term
Chief Judge	James Best	4	A	Pointe Coupee Parish, West Baton Rouge Parish		1993-
District Judge	Alvin Batiste, Jr.	1	C	Iberville Parish	Democrat	2003-
District Judge	Elizabeth Engolio	2	D	Iberville Parish, West Baton Rouge Parish	Democrat	2016-
District Judge	Tonya Lurry	3	B	Pointe Coupee Parish, West Baton Rouge Parish	No Party	2019-

Vacancies
Title	Name	Section	Division	Vacancy Date
Chief Judge	James Best	4	A	15 May 2017

== District 19 ==
Parish Served: East Baton Rouge Parish

District Seat: 19th Judicial District Courthouse (Baton Rouge, LA)

Current Judges
Title	Name	Section	Division	Type	Party	Term
District Judge	Donald Johnson	24	B	Civil	Democrat	1999-
District Judge	Janice Clark	21	D	Civil	Democrat	1993-
District Judge	Trudy White	27	J	Criminal	Democrat	2009-
District Judge	Bonnie Jackson	4	K	Criminal	Democrat	1993-
Chief Judge	Wilson Fields	25	O	Civil	Democrat	2001-
District Judge	Tarvald Smith	5	A	Criminal	Democrat	2019-
District Judge	Richard D. Anderson	2	G	Criminal	Republican	1996-
District Judge	Ronald R. Johnson	6	L	Criminal	Democrat	2019-
District Judge	Beau Higginbotham	7	C	Criminal	Republican	2015-
District Judge	Richard Moore, III	26	N	Civil	Republican	2005-
District Judge	Kelly E. Balfour	3	I	Criminal	Republican	2019-
District Judge	William Morvant	23	E	Civil	Republican	1997-
District Judge	"Tim" Kelley	22	F	Civil	Republican	1996-
District Judge	Fred T. Crifasi	1	H	Criminal	Republican	2018-
District Judge	"Lou" Daniel(Pro Tem)	8	M	Civil	Republican	1997-

== District 20 ==
Parishes Served: East Feliciana Parish, West Feliciana Parish

District Seats: East Feliciana Courthouse (Clinton, LA), West Feliciana Courthouse (St. Francisville, LA)

Current Judges
Title	Name	Division	Party	Term
Chief Judge	William G. Carmichael	B	Democrat	2002-
District Judge	Kathryn E. "Betsy" Jones	A	Democrat	2015-

== District 21 ==
Parishes Served: Livingston Parish, St. Helena Parish, Tangipahoa Parish

District Seats: Livingston Parish Courthouse (Livingston, LA), St. Helena Parish Courthouse (Greensburg, LA), Tangipahoa Parish Courthouse (Amite, LA)

Current Judges
Title	Name	Division	Type	Party	Term
Chief Judge	Robert H. Morrison, III	C		Republican	1988-
District Judge	"Jeff" Johnson	A		Republican	2015-
District Judge	Charlotte Hughes-Foster	B		Republican	2016-
District Judge	M. Douglas Hughes	D		Republican	1995-
District Judge	Brenda Bedsole Ricks	E		Republican	1997-
District Judge	Elizabeth Wolfe	F		Republican	2005-
District Judge	Blair Downing Edwards	I	Juvenile	Republican	2009-
District Judge	Jeffrey C. Cashe	J		Republican	2015-
District Judge	Jeffrey T. Oglesbee	K	Family	Republican	2014-

== District 22 ==
Parishes Served: St. Tammany Parish, Washington Parish

District Seats: St. Tammany Parish Courthouse (Covington, LA), Washington Parish Courthouse (Franklinton, LA)

Current Judges
Title	Name	Division	Party	Term
Chief Judge	Richard A. Swartz, Jr.	C	Republican	2009-
District Judge	Raymond S. Childress	A	Republican	1998-
District Judge	August J. Hand	B	Republican	2008-
District Judge	Peter J. Garcia	D	Independent	1997-
District Judge	William J. Burris	E	Republican	1997-
District Judge	Martin E. Coady	F	Republican	1991-
District Judge	Scott C. Gardner	G	Republican	2013-
District Judge	Alan A. Zaunbrecher	H	Republican	2017-
District Judge	Reginald T. Badeaux, III	I	Republican	1998-
District Judge	William J. Knight	J	Republican	2003-
District Judge	Mary C. Devereux	K	Republican	2009-
District Judge	Dawn Amacker	L	Republican	2009-

== District 23 ==
Parishes Served: Ascension Parish, Assumption Parish, St. James Parish

District Seats: Ascension Parish Courthouse (Donaldsonville, LA), Assumption Parish Courthouse (Napoleonville, LA), St. James Parish Courthouse (Convent, LA)

Current Judges
Title	Name	Election Section	Division	Party	Term
Chief Judge	Steven Tureau	1	D	Republican	2020-
District Judge	Jason M. Verdigets	2	A	Republican	2015-
District Judge	Cody Martin	2	B	Republican	2021-
District Judge	John Smith	2	C	Republican	2024-
District Judge	Keyojuan Gant Turner	2	E	Democrat	2023-
District Judge	Toni Falterman Menard	2	F	Republican	2025-
Parish Judge	Erin Lanoux	2	P	Republican	2019-

== District 24 ==
Parish Served: Jefferson Parish

District Seat: 24th Judicial District Courthouse (Gretna, LA)

Current Judges
Title	Name	Election Section	Division	Party	Term
Chief Judge	June Berry Darensburg	3	C	Democrat	2006-
District Judge	John J. Molaison, Jr.	1	E	Republican	2007-
District Judge	Stephen Grefer	1	J	Republican	2013-
District Judge	Henry G. Sullivan, Jr.	1	M	Democrat	1997-
District Judge	Danyelle Taylor	1	O	Republican	2015-
District Judge	Cornelius E. Regan	2	B	Republican	2006-
District Judge	Glenn Ansardi	2	H	Republican	2009-
District Judge	Nancy A. Miller	2	I	Republican	2009-
District Judge	Ellen Shirer Kovach	2	K	Republican	2009-
District Judge	Donald A. Rowan, Jr.	2	L	Republican	2007-
District Judge	Raymond S. Steib, Jr.	2	A	Republican	2010-
District Judge	Scott U. Schlegel	2	D	Republican	2013-
District Judge	Michael P. Mentz	2	F	Republican	2013-
District Judge	Stephen D. Enright, Jr.	2	N	Republican	2013-
District Judge	Adrian Adams	3	G	Democrat	2015-
District Judge	Lee V. Faulkner, Jr.	3	P	Democrat	2009-

== District 25 ==
Parish Served: Plaquemines Parish

District Seat: Plaquemines Parish Courthouse (Belle Chasse, LA)

Current Judges
Title	Name	Division	Party	Term
District Judge	Kevin Conner	A	Independent	2009-
Chief Judge	Michael D. Clement	B	Republican	2011-

== District 26 ==
Parishes Served: Bossier Parish, Webster Parish

District Seats: Bossier Parish Courthouse (Benton, LA), Webster Parish Courthouse (Minden, LA)

Current Judges
Title	Name	Division	Party	Term
Chief Judge	Parker Self	F	Republican	2004-
District Judge	Michael O. Craig	A	Republican	2009-
District Judge	Jefferson Thompson	B	Republican	2015-
vacant	vacant	C		
District Judge	Charles Jacobs	D	Republican	2015-
District Judge	"Mike" Nerren	E	Republican	2013-

Vacancies
Division	Vacated by	Date of vacancy
C	Jeff Cox	2016

== District 27 ==
Parish Served: St. Landry Parish

District Seat: St. Landry Parish Courthouse (Opelousas, LA)

Current Judges
Title	Name	Election Section	Division	Party	Term
Chief Judge	Alonzo Harris	1	C	Democrat	1993-
District Judge	James P. Doherty, Jr.	2	A	Democrat	2005-
District Judge	Jason Meche	3	D	Democrat	2015-
District Judge	Gerard Caswell	4	B	Democrat	2015-

== District 28 ==
Parish Served: LaSalle Parish

District Seat: LaSalle Parish Courthouse (Jena, LA)

Current Judge
Title	Name	Party	Term
Chief Judge	Jimmie Christopher Peters	Republican	2008-

== District 29 ==
Parish Served: St. Charles Parish

District Seat: St. Charles Parish Courthouse (Hahnville, LA)

Current Judges
Title	Name	Division	Party	Term
Chief Judge	Emile R. St. Pierre	C	Republican	
District Judge	M. Lauren Lemmon	D	Democrat	2008-
District Judge	Timothy Marcel	E	Democrat	2015-

== District 30 ==
Parish Served: Vernon Parish

District Seat: Vernon Parish Courthouse (Leesville, LA)

Current Judges
Title	Name	Division	Party	Term
Chief Judge	Vernon B. Clark	A	Democrat	1996-
District Judge	Anthony Eaves	B	Republican	2015-
District Judge	Scott Westerchil	C	Independent	2016-

== District 31 ==
Parish Served: Jefferson Davis Parish

District Seat: Jefferson Davis Parish Courthouse (Jennings, LA)

Current Judge
Title	Name	Party	Term
Chief Judge	Steve Gunnell	Republican	2007-

== District 32 ==
Parish Served: Terrebonne Parish

District Seat: Terrebonne Parish Courthouse (Houma, LA)

Current Judges
Title	Name	Division	Party	Term
Chief Judge	David W. Arceneaux	D	Republican	1999-
District Judge	George J. Larke, Jr.	A	Democrat	2002-
District Judge	John R. Walker	B		
District Judge	Juan Pickett	C	Republican	2015-
District Judge	Randall L. Bethancourt	E	Republican	2003-

== District 33 ==
Parish Served: Allen Parish

District Seat: Allen Parish Courthouse (Oberlin, LA)

Current Judges
Title	Name	Division	Party	Term
Chief Judge	Joel Davis	A	Democrat	1996-
District Judge	David Deshotels	B	Democrat	2015-

== District 34 ==
Parish Served: St. Bernard Parish

District Seat: St. Bernard Parish Courthouse (Chalmette, LA)

Current Judges
Title	Name	Division	Party	Term
Chief Judge	Jeanne Nunez Juneau	B	Democrat	2014-
District Judge	William Martin “BILLY” Mcgoey	A	Republican	
District Judge	Kim Cooper Jones	C	Republican	2015-
District Judge	Kirk Andrew Vaughn	D		1991-
District Judge	Jacques A. Sanborn	E	Democrat	2000-

== District 35 ==
Parish Served: Grant Parish

District Seat: Grant Parish Courthouse (Colfax, LA)

Current Judge
Title	Name	Party	Term
Chief Judge	Warren Daniel Willett	Republican	2009-

== District 36 ==
Parish Served: Beauregard Parish

District Seat: Beauregard Parish Courthouse (DeRidder, LA)

Current Judges
Title	Name	Division	Party	Term
Chief Judge	Martha Ann O'Neal	A	Democrat	2009-
District Judge	C. Kerry Anderson	B	Independent	2009-

== District 37 ==
Parish Served: Caldwell Parish

District Seat: Caldwell Parish Courthouse (Columbia, LA)

Current Judge
Title	Name	Party	Term
Chief Judge	Ashley Paul Thomas	Independent	2015-

== District 38 ==
Parish Served: Cameron Parish

District Seat: Cameron Parish Courthouse (Cameron, LA)

Current Judge
Title	Name	Party	Term
Chief Judge	Penelope Richard	Democrat	2008-

== District 39 ==
Parish Served: Red River Parish

District Seat: Red River Parish Courthouse (Coushatta, LA)

Current Judge
Title	Name	Party	Term
Chief Judge	Lewis Sams	Republican	

== District 40 ==
Parish Served: St. John the Baptist Parish

District Seat: St. John the Baptist Parish Courthouse (Edgard, LA)

Current Judges
Title	Name	Election Section	Division	Party	Term
Chief Judge	Madeline Jasmine	2	A	Democrat	1991-
District Judge	Nghana Lewis	1	B	Democrat	2021-
District Judge	Sterling Snowdy	3	C	Democrat	1997-

== Orleans Parish District Courts ==
Parish Served: Orleans Parish

District Seats: Orleans Civil District Court (New Orleans, LA), Orleans Criminal District Court (New Orleans, LA)

=== Current Judges ===
Civil District Court
Title	Name	Division	Party	Term
District Judge	Ellen M. Hazeur	A	Democrat	
District Judge	Marissa Hutabarat	B	Democrat	2023-
District Judge	Sidney H. Cates, IV	C	Democrat	2004-
District Judge	Monique Barial	D	Democrat	2015-
District Judge	Omar Mason	E	Democrat	2019-
District Judge	Jennifer Medley	F	Democrat	2021-
District Judge	Veronica E. Henry	G	Democrat	2024-
District Judge	LaKeisha N. Jefferson	H	Democrat	2024-
District Judge	Lori Jupiter	I	Democrat	
District Judge	D. Nicole Sheppard	J	Democrat	
District Judge	Bernadette D'Souza	K	Democrat	2012-
District Judge	Kern A. Reese	L	Democrat	2001-
Chief Judge	Paulette Irons	M	Democrat	2004-
District Judge	Ethel S. Julien	N	Democrat	1995-

Criminal District Court
Title	Name	Section	Party	Term
District Judge	Simone A. Levine	A	Democrat	2023-
Chief Judge	Tracey Flemings-Davillier	B	Democrat	2013-
District Judge	Benedict J. Willard	C	Democrat	2003-
District Judge	Kimya M. Holmes	D	Democrat	2021-
District Judge	Rhonda Goode-Douglas	E	Democrat	2021-
District Judge	Robin D. Pittman	F	Democrat	2009-
District Judge	Nandi F. Campbell	G	Democrat	2021-
District Judge	Camille Buras	H	Democrat	1998-
District Judge	Leon T. Roche	I	Democrat	2023-
District Judge	Darryl A. Derbigny	J	Democrat	2003-
District Judge	Marcus O. DeLarge	K	Democrat	2021-
District Judge	Angel S. Harris	L	Democrat	2021-

== District 42 ==
Parish Served: DeSoto Parish

District Seat: DeSoto Parish Courthouse (Mansfield, LA)

Judges
Title	Name	Division	Party	Term
Chief Judge	Amy Burford McCartney	A	Independent	2016-
District Judge	Nicholas E. "Nick" Gasper	B		2020
