= German Coast =

Region of early Louisiana settlement

Coordinates: 29°55′44″N 90°20′22″W

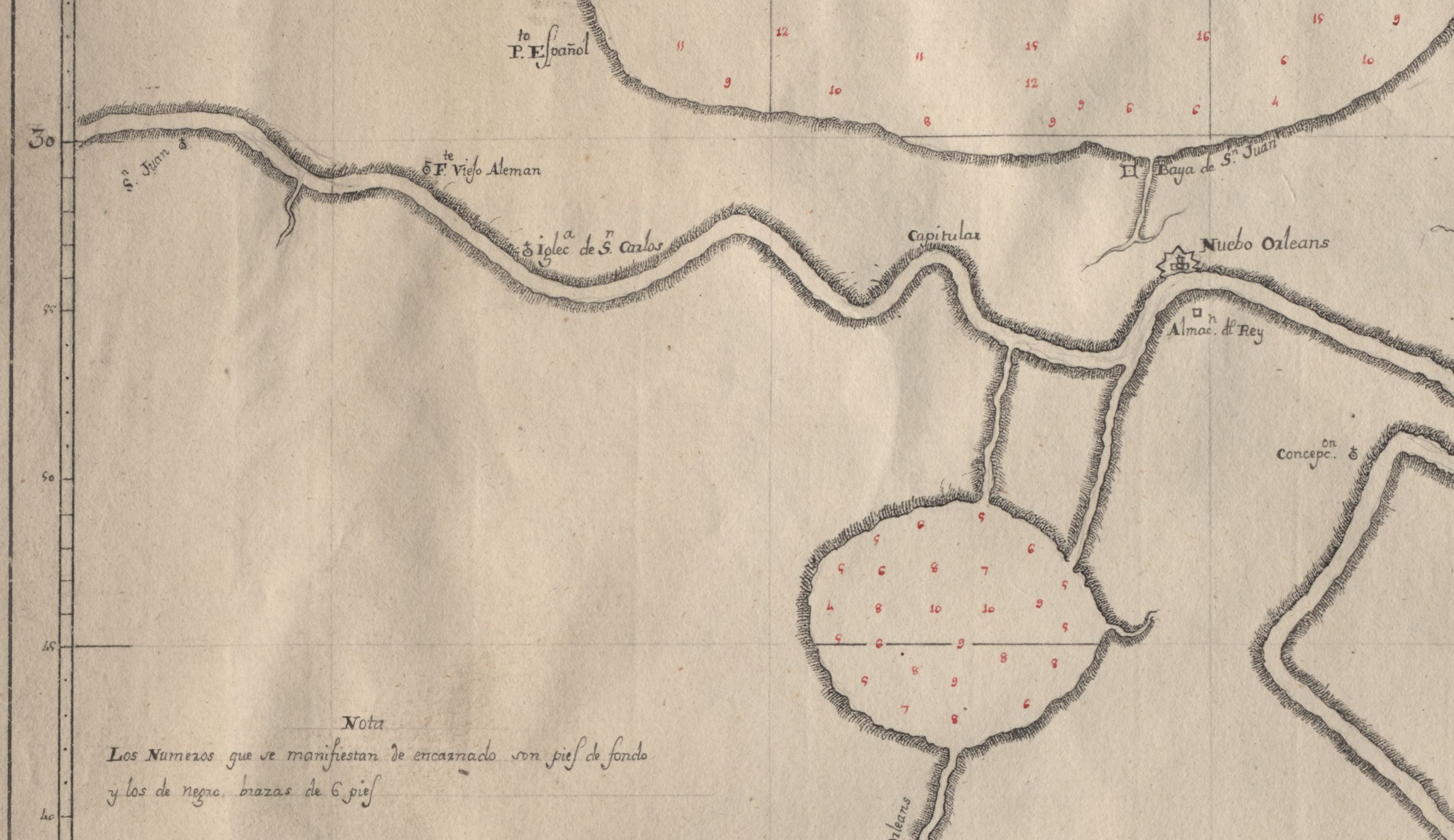
German Coast, 1736. Detail from a larger map.

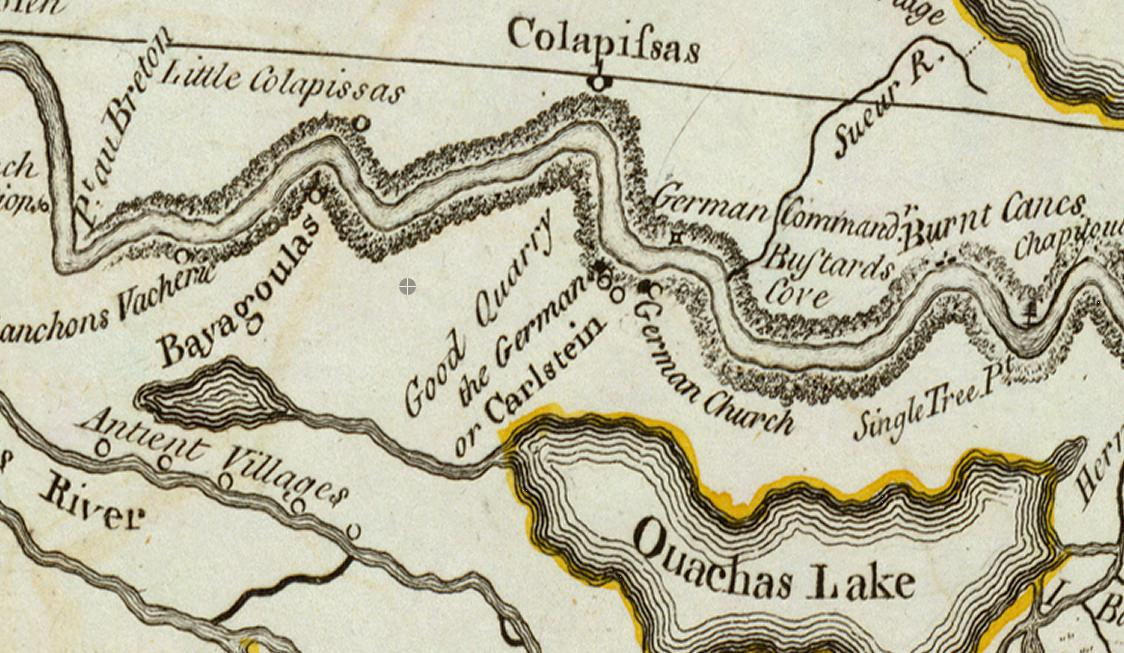
Map of the German Coast, 1775

The German Coast (French: Côte des Allemands, Spanish: Costa Alemana, German: Deutsche Küste) was a region of early Louisiana settlement located above New Orleans, on the west bank of the Mississippi River. Specifically, it extends from east (or south) to west (or north), in St. Charles, St. John the Baptist, and St. James parishes of present-day Acadiana. It was largely settled by German immigrants. The four settlements of Augsburg, Hoffen, Karlstein, and Marienthal were located along this "coast".

== Early settlements ==
As early as 1718, John Law and the Company of the Indies began recruiting French settlers to settle Louisiana (New France), though not specifically the region that would become the German Coast. The early French settlers were not suited or prepared for the harsh conditions in Louisiana. In 1719, Jean-Pierre Pury, a director at the Company of the Indies, proposed recruiting Germans and German-speaking Swiss farmers to Louisiana and that same year, with a 25-year charter, Law merged the Company of the West with his Company of the Indies. Also in 1719, a small group of German settlers arrived in the Louisiana French colony and were transported by waterways 30 miles (48 km) west of New Orleans to a location along the west bank of the Mississippi River, north of Ouachas Lake. This area of German settlers was called les Allemands or the Germans.

In 1720, Germans were recruited in early spring to settle in les Allemands. Roughly 4,000 individuals (450 families), mostly from Rhineland, but also from Baden-Württemberg, Bavaria, Swedish Pomerania, Alsace–Lorraine, Belgium, and Switzerland traveled across France to Lorient in Brittany to make the voyage to Louisiana. Those families who were Lutherans and Calvinists were advised to convert to Catholicism as soon as possible, or their travel through France could be problematic. Some converted, while others did not.

On March 7, 1721, the settlers set sail and arrived in Old Biloxi on June 4, 1721. On December 15, 1721, French Governor Bienville issued an order for boats to transport the recently arrived German-speaking settlers including newly named Commandant Charles Frédérique d'Arensbourg, born Karl Friedrich von Arensburg, to the already established villages of Hoffen, Marienthal, and Augsburg on the west bank of the Mississippi River.

The settlers left for the settlements in January 1722 and of the roughly four thousand individuals that initially began the trip in Europe, when they reached their port of embarkation in March 1722, a Company of the Indies official counted only 330 settlers because many of them perished due to the harsh conditions of their long journey to Louisiana.

Besides "les Allemands", the collective name for the German settlements was Karlstein, but the area eventually became known as the "German Coast" and these settlements opened the present-day River Parishes to European settlement. In addition to the area sometimes being referred to as Karlstein after Charles Frederick d'Arensbourg or Karl Friedrich d’Arensbourg, who for more than 55 years, was the acknowledged leader of the German Coast; the name of the tract of land given to him was also Karlstein. The German Coast was located along the west bank of the Mississippi River extending roughly from Taft north to Lucy in present-day Louisiana.

By 1723, the area included several dozen homes, contained in the settlement of Hoffen (later built Glendale, Hymelia, Trinity, and Killona Plantations), Karlstein (later built Waterford Plantation), Augsberg (to the rear of Killona and Waterford Plantations), and Mariental (behind the present site of Agrico and OxyChem industrial plants at Taft).

When the Company of the Indies folded in 1731, the settlers became independent land owners. Despite periodic flooding, hurricanes, and the rigors of frontier life, the German pioneers made a success of their settlements. Their farming endeavors provided food not only for themselves but also for New Orleans' residents. The German settlers continuously supplied the markets of the city using the Mississippi River to transport their surplus produce in small boats or canoes, known as pirogues, returning home through Lake Pontchartrain into Bayous Trepagnier (originally Bayou Tigouyou on maps as late as 1749) and Sieur, as well as other tributaries to the Mississippi River. Some historians credit these German farmers with the survival of early New Orleans.

By the end of the Spanish era, the German Coast had become so well known for its abundance that it acquired the designation of Gold Coast. At the time of the Louisiana Purchase, the German Coast was renowned as the best cultivated part of Louisiana.

== Culture ==
Most of the German Coast settlers came from the Rhineland region of Germany, the German-speaking cantons of Switzerland, and other areas. Many came from the German-speaking region of Alsace–Lorraine in France, and some from Belgium.

From the time of their arrival, the German immigrants began speaking French and intermarried with the early French settlers. Over the subsequent decades, they intermarried with the descendants of the latter as well as the Acadians, (Acadians are those who became known as "Cajuns.")

A number of common Cajun surnames have German origins: for example, Schexnayder (various spellings), LaBranche (a calque of Zweig), Folse, Zeringue (Zehring), Hymel (Himmel), and Trosclair (a phonetic macaronic of Troxler).

The Germans are also credited with introducing the accordion into Cajun music.

A distinct German tradition that has survived in Louisiana is the celebration of St. Nicholas Day in Roberts Cove, Louisiana, a small community in Acadia Parish, Louisiana. In 1881, German immigrants from Langbroich (near Gangelt, close to Aachen) settled in the area. This part of North Rhine-Westphalia borders the Netherlands and shares both a flat rural landscape and a linguistic heritage with its Dutch neighbors, including dialects of Plattdeutsch closely related to Dutch and Frisian. The St. Nicholas customs maintained in Roberts Cove include the appearance of St. Nicholas accompanied by a dark companion figure resembling the Dutch Zwarte Piet. While the tradition in Roberts Cove has not generated local controversy, similar portrayals in the Netherlands have been widely criticized for their use of blackface and perceived racial stereotyping.

== History ==
=== 18th century ===
Engraving of the "Schlacht bei Neu-Orleans" or "Battle of New Orleans" in 1815

In the Louisiana Rebellion of 1768, German colonists joined Acadians from the Cabannocé Post area to march on New Orleans and overthrow the new Spanish colonial governor Antonio de Ulloa.

Between 1769 and 1777, Governor Luis de Unzaga Amezaga 'le Conciliateur' promoted the colonization of the extensive province of Louisiana and distributed land and agricultural tools to the European families who came to live there. Unzaga created the world's first bilingual public educational system in New Orleans and also allowed various peoples to continue speaking in various languages such as English on the eastern bank of the Mississippi or German on the German coast.

Starting in the late 1770s, the German and Acadian settlers united again, under Spanish colonial governor Bernardo de Gálvez, to fight the British during the American Revolutionary War.

During the Anglo-Spanish War (1779-1783), Bernardo de Gálvez established four militia regiments "Milicias provinciales disciplinadas de los alemanes" with the German and Acadian population.

They took part in the following battles:

- Capture of Fort Bute (1779) Bernardo de Galvez recruited 760 men including 160 Indians in this area.
- Battle of Baton Rouge (1779)
- Battle of Mobile (1781)
- Siege of Pensacola (1781)

=== 19th century ===
In 1811, the German Coast was the site of the largest slave revolt in US history, the 1811 German Coast uprising. This was after the US had acquired the Louisiana Territory, but more than a year before the Territory of Orleans was admitted as the state of Louisiana.

The rebellion's leaders were slaves Quamana and Harry, as well as Charles Deslondes, a free man of color. They gathered an estimated 500 slaves from plantations along the River Road and marched toward New Orleans. The insurgents killed two white men without meeting much resistance, but they were not well armed.

The local militia was called out and killed nearly half of the total 95 slaves who died in the rebellion. The remainder were executed after tribunals were held in the parishes, including Orleans Parish.

=== 20th century ===
During World War I, in a reaction against Germany as the enemy, the Louisiana state legislature passed Act 114. It prohibited all expressions of German culture and heritage in the state, especially the printed or spoken use of the German language. The use of the German language had already declined among descendants of settlers of the German coast, but descendants of more recent German immigrants who arrived after the Revolutions of 1848 and later were affected.

=== 21st century ===
In 2014, Whitney Plantation opened for tours in what was the German Coast. It addresses the history and legacy of slavery and is open to the public.

== See also ==
- German American
- German Coast, Orleans Territory
