= Nghana Lewis =

Judge, scholar, lawyer and tenured associate professor

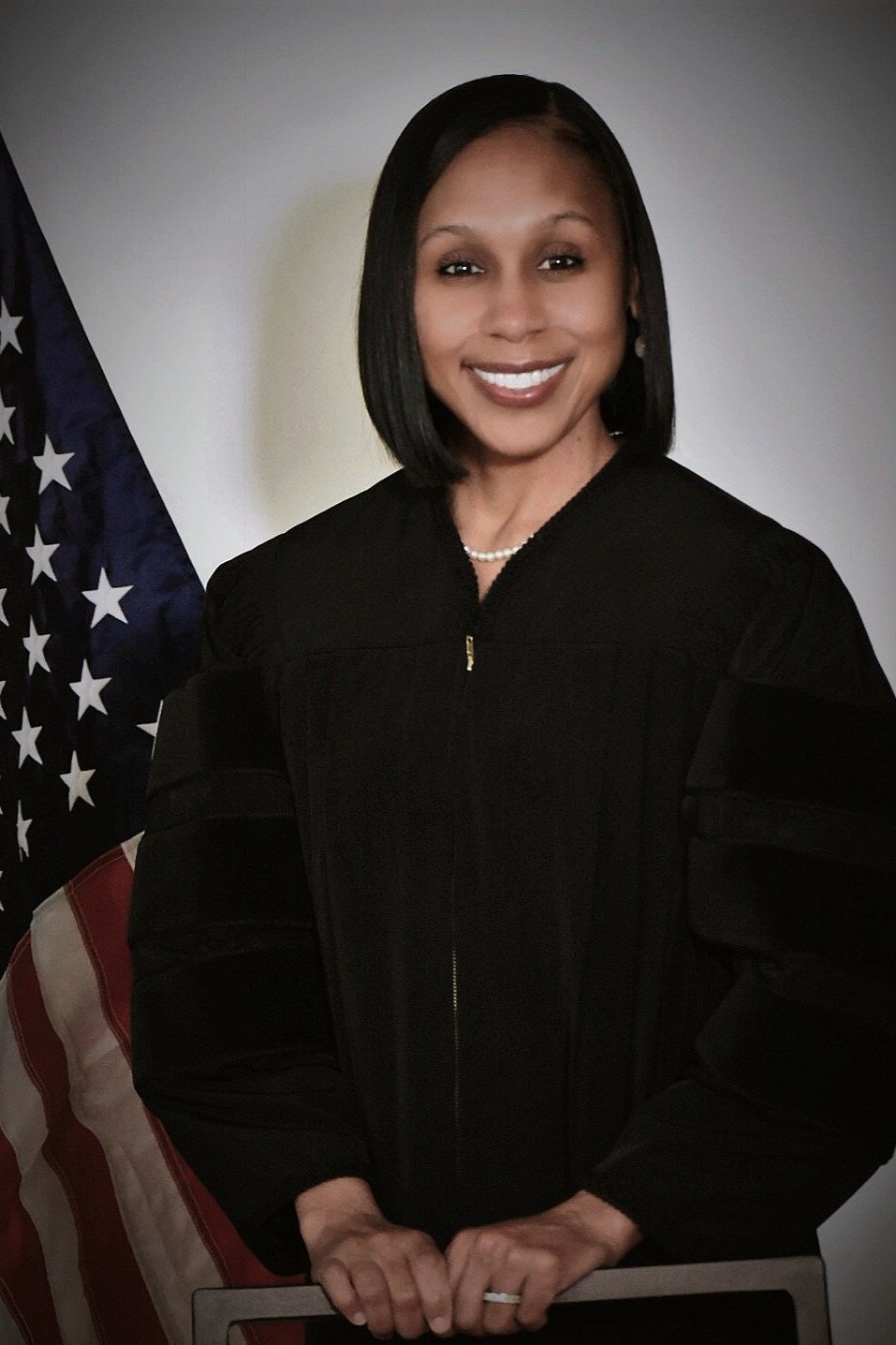

District Judge, 40th Judicial District Court, Division B
- Incumbent
- Assumed office January 1, 2021
- Constituency: St. John the Baptist Parish
- Preceded by: Jeff Perriloux

Personal details
- Born: Lafayette, Louisiana
- Spouse: Corey Hutchinson
- Children: 2
- Education: Tulane University (BA), University of Illinois Urbana-Champaign (MA, PhD), Loyola University New Orleans College of Law (JD)
- Profession: Professor, scholar, attorney, judge
- Website: https://40thjdc.org/judge-lewis

Nghana tamu Lewis is an American judge, lawyer, and academic from Lafayette, Louisiana. In January 2021, Lewis took the bench to serve as the Division B 40th District Court judge, in St. John the Baptist Parish, Louisiana. Lewis is also a tenured associate professor in both the English Department and the Africana Studies Department at Tulane University.

== Early life and education ==
Lewis grew up in Lafayette, Louisiana. She attended St. Thomas More Catholic School.

She earned a Bachelor of Arts in English from Tulane University, magna cum laude, in 1994. During her undergraduate studies, Lewis was elected to the Newcomb College Senate and twice appointed to the Newcomb College Honor Board. In her sophomore year, she pledged Delta Sigma Theta sorority, and was chosen as a Newcomb College Asset, a distinction given to ten Newcomb women for campus leadership and service.

Lewis earned a Master of Arts in English from the University of Illinois-Urbana-Champaign. During her graduate studies, Lewis became the first recipient of the Richard K. Barksdale Fellowship and was elected to the English Graduate Student Association.

She earned a PhD in English specializing in American literature since 1800 from the University of Illinois at Urbana-Champaign (2001); and a JD from Loyola University New Orleans College of Law.

In 2023, Lewis began her Master of Judicial Studies degree at Duke University School of Law.

Lewis has been a resident of St. John the Baptist Parish, Louisiana, since 2004.

== Career ==
=== Academia ===
==== Louisiana State University (2001-2005) ====
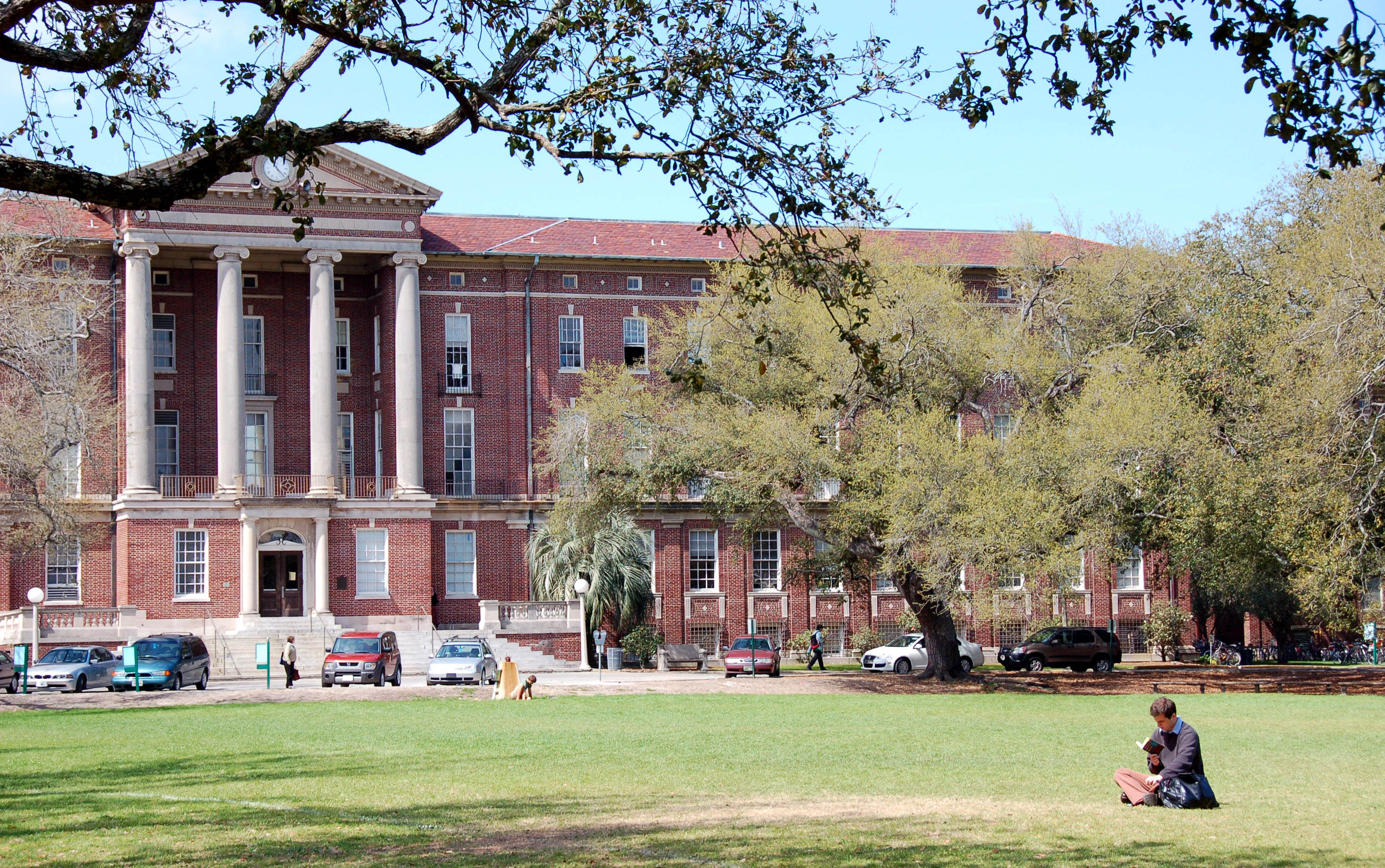
Newcomb Hall, Tulane University

In 2001, Lewis accepted an assistant professorship in English at Louisiana State University upon earning her PhD. While at LSU, she launched the Encouraging Student Scholarship & Excellence through Native-Centered Education Program (ESSENCE) a 501(c)(3) not-for-profit organization that provides supplemental educational services in English, Language Arts, and Reading for K-12 schools.

==== Tulane University (2005-present) ====
In 2005, Lewis accepted a joint assistant professorship in English and African & African Diaspora Studies at Tulane University. In 2010, she was awarded the Suzanne & Stephen Weiss Presidential Fellowship for Outstanding Undergraduate Teaching at Tulane.

Lewis is a tenured associate professor, with joint appointments in the English Department and Africana Studies Program, at Tulane University. She is also an affiliate faculty member of Tulane University Law School and an adjunct professor in Tulane's Department of Psychology. Lewis' research and teaching focus on black literary and cultural studies, black women's health & wellness, hip hop culture and criminal justice reform. Lewis held a Social Entrepreneurship Professorship from 2011 to 2014.

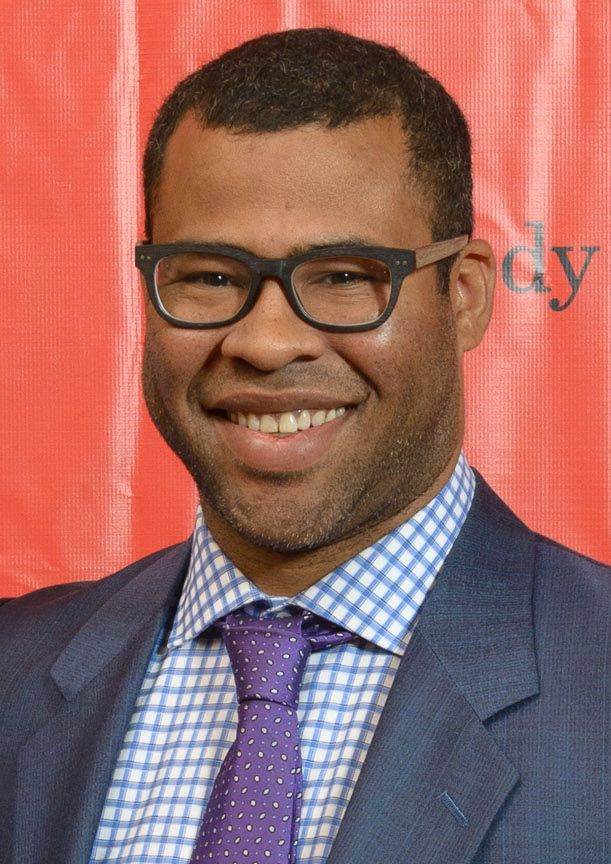
Jordan Peele

In the spring of 2020, after Tulane transitioned to virtual learning following the outbreak of the COVID-19 pandemic, Lewis invited Jordan Peele to speak via Zoom to two of her classes, Introduction to Africana Studies and Introduction to African American Literature. Peele accepted and participated in a conversation about his Oscar-awarded film, Get Out, which the students had studied earlier in the semester. Lewis said, "Entry points for discussion differed, with Peele's cinematic vision, calls-and-responses to Ira Levin's Rosemary's Baby and Stepford Wives, and genre-bending emerging centrally in my African American Literature course, and modalities of white privilege, white power, and black racial injustice shaping engagement in my Introduction to Africana Studies course."

=== Legal career ===
Lewis began her legal career clerking for Judge Mary Hotard Becnel in Division B of the 40th Judicial District Court. Following the clerkship, Lewis worked as a public defender in St. John the Baptist Parish.

Prior to taking the bench, Lewis, a defense attorney, maintained a private law practice in LaPlace, Louisiana, where she represented clients in the areas of criminal defense, Social Security, employment and labor, and civil rights.

=== Louisiana State judicial service ===
Louisiana state court judges are selected through a partisan election process. Under the Louisiana majority-vote system, also known as a jungle primary, a candidate needs to win a simple majority of all votes cast for the office in October. If no candidate meets that threshold, the top two candidates, regardless of their partisan affiliations, advance to a second election in December, and the candidate who receives the most votes in the runoff wins. Louisiana has 217 district court judgeships and district court judges serve six year terms.

Between the court of appeals, district courts, and city and parish courts in Louisiana, 24-25% have non-white judges as of a 2018 Tulane University report. The exception to Louisiana's mostly white and male bench is Orleans Parish, without which the state's racial and gender disparity would be much greater. While women make up 51% of the Louisiana's population, they make up only 32% of its state and federal judges.

==== 2016 election - 40th Judicial District Division B ====
St. John the Baptist Parish, Louisiana

In 2016, Lewis ran in the general election for the 40th Judicial District Division B seat, which oversees civil, criminal, traffic, juvenile and family cases in St. John the Baptist Parish. The parish is located on the Mississippi River approximately 130 miles (210 km) upriver from the Gulf of Mexico and 40 miles (48 km) upriver from the City of New Orleans.

St. John the Baptist Parish has 5,696 registered Democratic voters, 1,671 registered Republican voters, and 2,569 voters registered as "other." The parish has 4,238 white registered voters, 5,218 black registered voters, and 480 "other" registered voters. The parish has 4,327 male registered voters and 5,607 female registered voters.

The judgeship opened after Judge Mary Hotard Becnel announced she was stepping down after 23 years of service at the end of 2016, leaving the door open to local candidates looking to serve out the remainder of her six year term, which ended in 2021. Lewis clerked for Judge Becnel in 2007 and has said that this experience along with her work as a public defender inspired her to run in 2016.

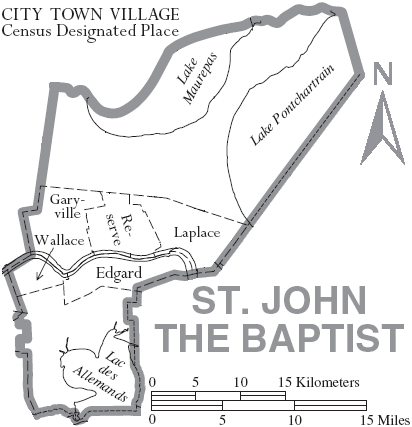
Map of St. John the Baptist Parish, Louisiana, with municipal labels

The election took place on November 8, 2016. Perilloux took 38% of the votes compared to 37% for Lewis. Rob Snyder Jr., the parish's 3rd District justice of the peace, got 25% of the votes. The close race between Perriloux and Lewis led to a runoff election in December.

40th Judicial District, Division B Election, November 8, 2016, 66.6% Turnout
Party	Candidate	Vote %	Votes
No party	Jeff Perriloux	37.78%	2,216
No party	Nghana Lewis Gauff	37.08%	2,175
Democratic	Rob Snyder	25.13%	1,474

In December's runoff following the close race, Lewis was defeated by Perilloux.

40th Judicial District, Division B Runoff Election, December 10, 2016, 34.9% Turnout
Party	Candidate	Vote %	Votes
No party	Jeff Perriloux	54.68%	1,812
No party	Nghana Lewis Gauff	45.32%	1,502

Perilloux was indicted on charges of indecent behavior with a juvenile and sexual battery taking place in 2017. In 2018, Perriloux was suspended from the bench pending the outcome of a criminal case. In 2020, Perilloux resigned after being convicted of three felony counts of indecent behavior with a juvenile and one count of misdemeanor sexual battery for allegedly sexually assaulting a 15-year-old girl and groping two other teenagers.

==== 2020 election - 40th Judicial District Division B ====
In 2020, Lewis defeated challenger Leandre Millet and won the election for the 40th Judicial District (Division B) seat. Lewis told L'Observateur that her priorities would include facilitating the collection of unpaid ticket-related fines and costs, meeting with stakeholders to begin development of a comprehensive juvenile justice prevention plan and developing a mandatory community service plan for the court.

Despite having been convicted of three felony counts of indecent behavior and one misdemeanor count of sexual battery, Perilloux received 7% (434 votes) of the votes on November 3. Perilloux's name was unable to be removed from the ballot because his conviction and resignation from the bench occurred after the candidacy period challenge ended.

40th Judicial District, Division B, November 3, 2020, 67.2% Turnout
Party	Candidate	Vote %	Votes
Democratic	Nghana Lewis	50%	3,115
Democratic	Leandre Millet	43%	2,670
No party	Jeff Perriloux	7%	434

==== 40th Judicial District Court (2021-present) ====
Lewis took the bench on January 1, 2021.

For a Black History Month interview in L'Observateur, Lewis was asked about the changes she'd like to see in the St. John the Baptist community. She replied, "To enrich the overall quality of life in St. John the Baptist Parish for all citizens of our parish, I would like to see increased community awareness-raising, transparency and fiscal responsibility in the day-to-day operations of all branches of our government. I am especially excited about opportunities that the judges of the 40th Judicial District Court, the district attorney, our parish president and local school leaders and educators have been exploring to provide enriched literacy instruction to elementary school children."

Lewis founded the Literacy Clinic in August 2021, a one-year pilot program focused on literacy services for Fifth Ward Elementary with the 40th Judicial District Court serving as a mediator to identify those who could benefit from literacy services. Due to the research, the clinic prioritizes K-2 education. Lewis said "Studies indicate that if a child is not reading at grade level by third grade, there is a greater likelihood that child will not be successful in school, and that’s when you start to see problems that may ultimately lead that child to entering the criminal justice system as a juvenile."

In 2021, Lewis was appointed to Louisiana's Children's Justice Act Task Force and, in 2022, she was appointed to the Louisiana Supreme Court Technology Commission, one of only three standing committees of the Louisiana Supreme Court, for a two-year term.

In January 2023, Lewis helped launch a pilot program, "Respect is Just a Minimum" geared toward St. John the Baptist youth in grades 7 through 12. Lewis said that the program grew out of a "need to uplift young people who have tremendous potential to be successful but lack the proper support." The program is funded through a $119,000 grant from the Office of Juvenile Justice awarded to the 40th Judicial District Court and will offer ten weekly sessions related to financial literacy, conflict resolution, healthy competency and empathic understanding.

==== Notable cases ====
===== State of Louisiana v. Herbert Hille Jr. (2021) =====
In August 2021, Lewis handed down a decision regarding criminal defendant Herbert Hille Jr. for his conviction of molestation of a juvenile. Hille, a 73 year old from LaPlace, pled guilty on July 13, 2021, to repeated molestation of a young child in his care. Lewis ordered that he serve 15 years, without the possibility of probation, parole, or suspension of sentence.

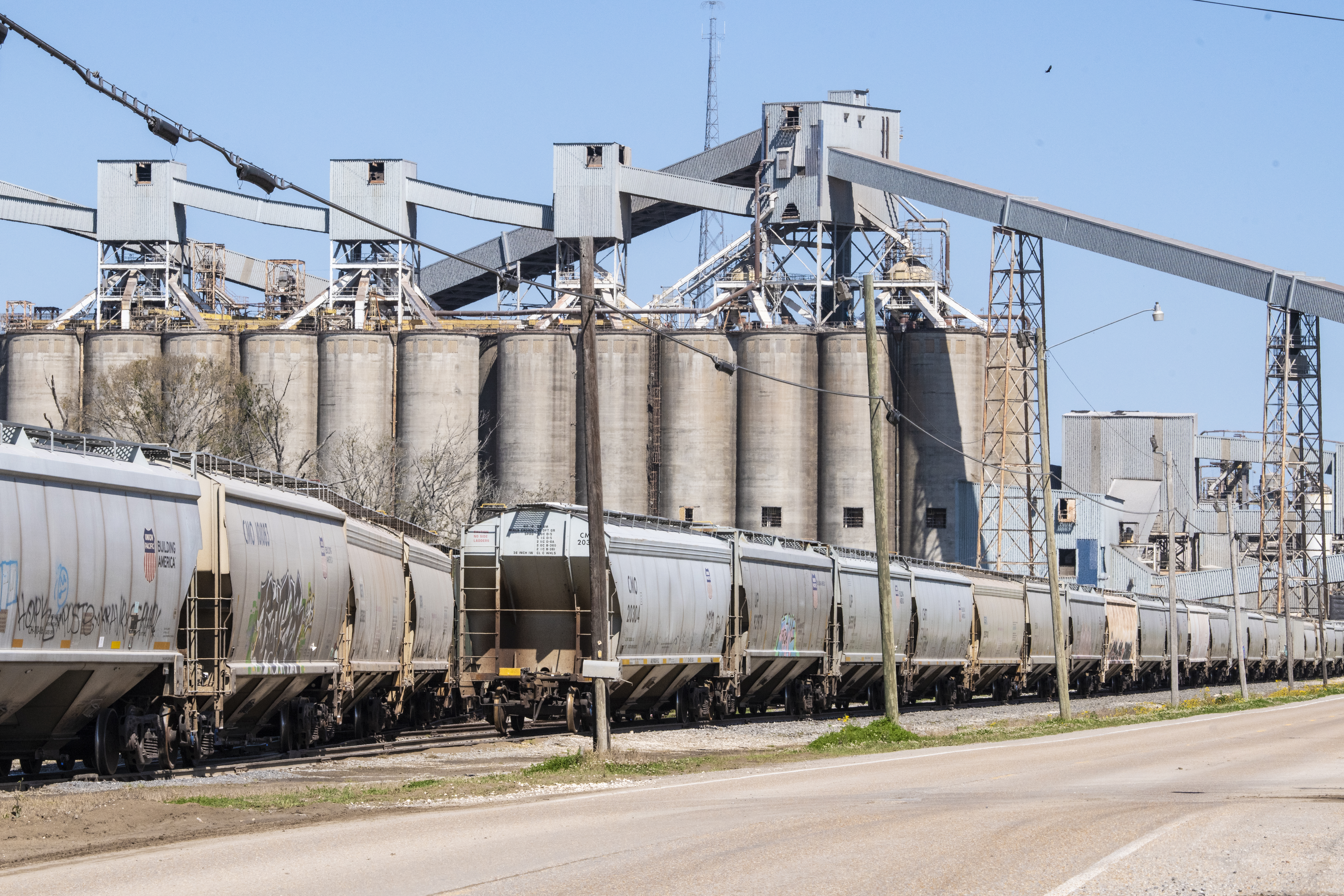
Grain elevator in Nine Mile Point, Louisiana

===== The Descendants Project v. St. John the Baptist Parish, et al. (2023) =====
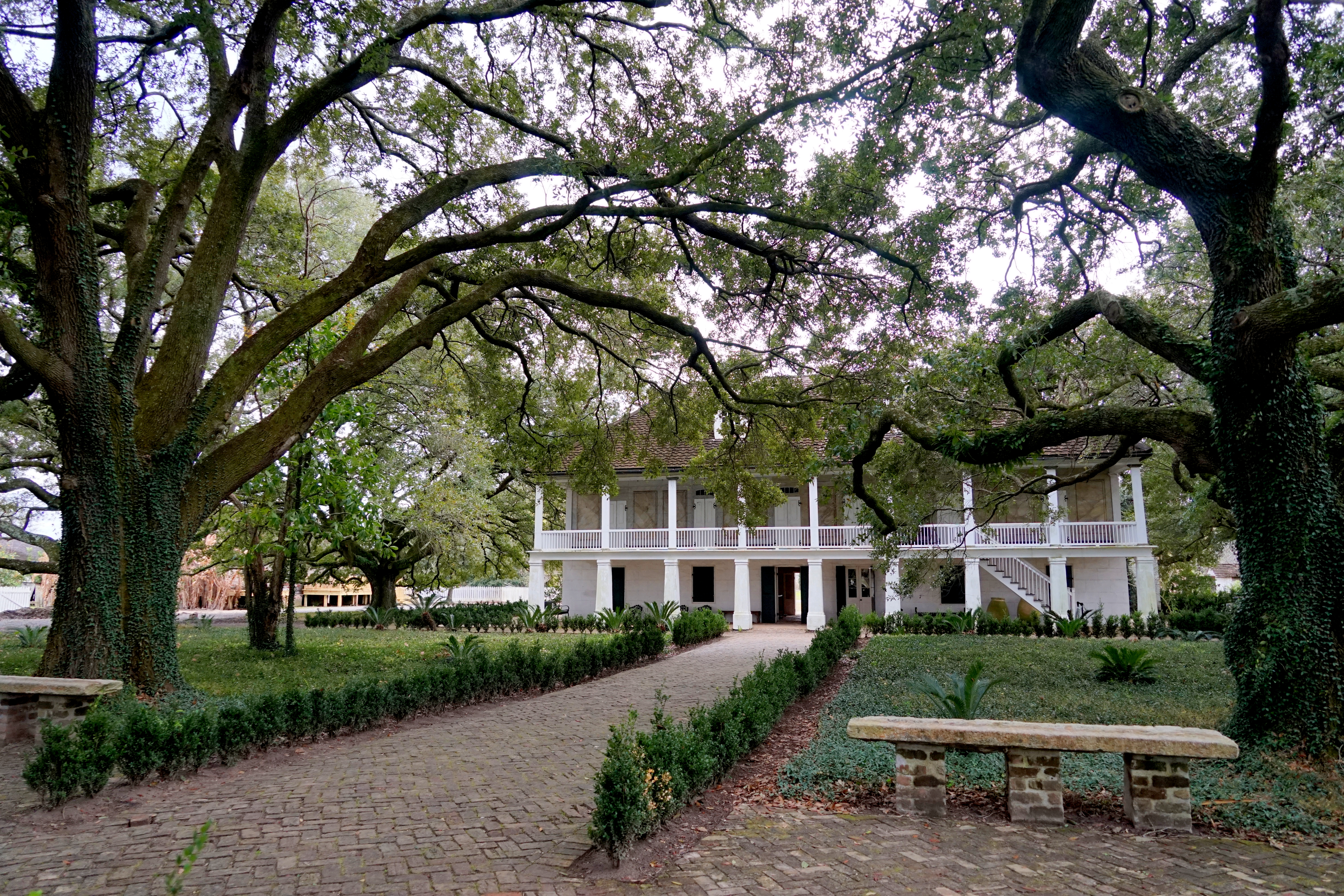
Whitney Plantation, Wallace, Louisiana

In November 2023, Lewis ordered the St. John the Baptist Planning Commission to halt any rezoning of residential land where a company is trying to build a grain terminal. Lewis issued a preliminary injunction against Greenfield Louisiana, and granted a restraining order to the Descendants Project, an activist group founded by twin sisters Jocyntia and Joyceia Banner. The Descendants Project originally sued to overturn the 1990 zoning change in 2021, attempting to block the construction of a 222-acre grain terminal complex in the predominantly black community of Wallace on the West Bank. Greenfield's $400 million plans included over 50 grain silos, one of which would be as tall as the Statue of Liberty, and a conveyor more than 300 feet tall and less than a half-mile from the Whitney Plantation Historic District.

In the order's notes, Lewis said the content of the parish's rezoning application, which used 1990s zoning maps and marked residential land as agricultural, was "at best, incomplete, and, at wors[t], dissembling." Lewis also stated that the parish's inability to update its zoning maps to reflect the August ruling "points to a lack of transparency and forthrightness by parish government."

The Banner sisters are leading an effort to overturn decades-old zoning changes that allow heavy industries to locate next to neighborhoods. In 2023, the National Trust for Historic Preservation named the West Bank of St. John the Baptist Parish as one of eleven most endangered historic places. The U.S. Army Corps of Engineers' team of historical experts found that the Greenfield Grain Terminal would harm historic places in the parish, and concluded that the construction and operation would adversely impact the Willow Grove Cemetery, Whitney Plantation, Evergreen Plantation and Oak Alley Plantation, as well as the larger, idyllic setting of Great River Road. In 2018, St. John the Baptist was named the parish with the highest cancer risk in the United States.

== Personal life ==
Lewis' father, Francis Lewis, was from Carencro, Louisiana, and her mother, Gwendolyn Lewis, was from Alexandria, Louisiana. Lewis has two children from a previous marriage, and is married to Corey Hutchinson.

== Recognition ==
- Recipient, Roddy Richard Lifetime Achievement Award for Commitment to Serving Louisiana Youth, 2008
- Suzanne & Stephen Weiss Presidential Fellowship for outstanding undergraduate teaching at Tulane, 2010
- New Orleans Magazine Top Female Achiever, 2013
- Pro Bono Hero, Louisiana State Bar Association, 2018
- NAACP Award for Education & Representation, 2020

== Affiliations ==
- National Bar Association
- Louisiana's Children's Justice Act Task Force, (2021–present)
- Louisiana Supreme Court Technology Commission, (2022-2024)
- Louisiana 4th and 5th Circuits Judges Association, Parliamentarian
- Delta Sigma Theta sorority at Tulane University
- Founding Member, Mystic Krewe of Femme Fatale, a Mardi Gras Krewe founded by African American women
- Tulane Inn of Court, American Inns of Court
- National Association of Women Judges
- Louisiana District Judges Association

== Selected publications ==
=== Books ===
Entitled to the Pedestal: Place, Race, and Progress in White Southern Women’s Writing,1920-1945. University of Iowa Press, 2007.

=== Articles ===
- “‘WE MUST SPEAK WITH THE SAME WEAPONS’: RE-INSCRIBING RESISTANCE IN ZORA NEALE HURSTON’S ‘DUST TRACKS ON A ROAD.’” CLA Journal, vol. 45, no. 3, 2002, pp. 311–28.
- “In a Different Chord: Interpreting the Relations among Black Female Sexuality, Agency, and the Blues.” African American Review, vol. 37, no. 4, 2003, pp. 599–609.
- “The Rhetoric of Mobility, the Politics of Consciousness: Julia Mood Peterkin and the Case of a White Black Writer.” African American Review, vol. 38, no. 4, 2004, pp. 589–608.
- "You Sell Your Soul like You Sell a Piece of Ass": Rhythms of Black Female Sexuality and Subjectivity in MeShell Ndegeocello's "Cookie: The Anthropological Mixtape" Black Music Research Journal, Vol. 26, No. 1, The Music of African-American Women: Secular and Sacred, Uplift and Self-Assertion (Spring, 2006), pp. 111–130
- “An Issue of Environmental Justice: Understanding the Relationship among HIV/AIDS Infection in Women, Water Distribution, and Global Investment in Rural Sub-Saharan Africa.” Black Women, Gender + Families, vol. 3, no. 1, 2009, pp. 39–64.
- "Black women's health in the age of hip hop and HIV/AIDS: a model for civic engagement and feminist activism." On Campus with Women, vol. 38, no. 3, winter 2010.
- "After Katrina: poverty, politics, and performance in New Orleans public schools." Loyola Journal of Public Interest Law, vol. 11, no. 2, spring 2010, pp. 285–318.
- "Facts and fiction: literary instructions on public school integration in ernest hill's satisfied with nothin'." Law and Literature, 20(1), 2008, pp 115–126.
- "Plantation performances in Langston Hughes' Mulatto." CLA Journal, vol. 55, no. 3, Mar. 2012, pp. 279–295.
- “Prioritized: THE HIP HOP (RE)CONSTRUCTION OF BLACK WOMANHOOD IN GIRLFRIENDS AND THE GAME.” Watching While Black: Centering the Television of Black Audiences, edited by BERETTA E. SMITH-SHOMADE, Rutgers University Press, 2012, pp. 157–71.
- “The Rhetoric of Mobility, the Politics of Consciousness: Julia Mood Peterkin and the Case of a White Black Writer.” African American Review, vol. 38, no. 4, 2004, pp. 589–608.

== See also ==
- St. John the Baptist Parish, Louisiana
- Tulane University
- Delta Sigma Theta sorority
- Women in the United States Judiciary
- Louisiana district courts
