= River Road, Louisiana =

Section of the Great River Road, USA

River Road in Louisiana is the most well-known segment of the Great River Road in the United States. It runs for about 70 miles (110 km) from Baton Rouge to New Orleans through the River Parishes, on both sides of the Mississippi River. Dotted on each side of the river are antebellum plantation houses. Today, there are also dozens of industrial plants along the route, the health impacts of which have given rise to the name Cancer Alley.
