= Chagrin Falls High School =

Public school in Chagrin Falls, Ohio, US

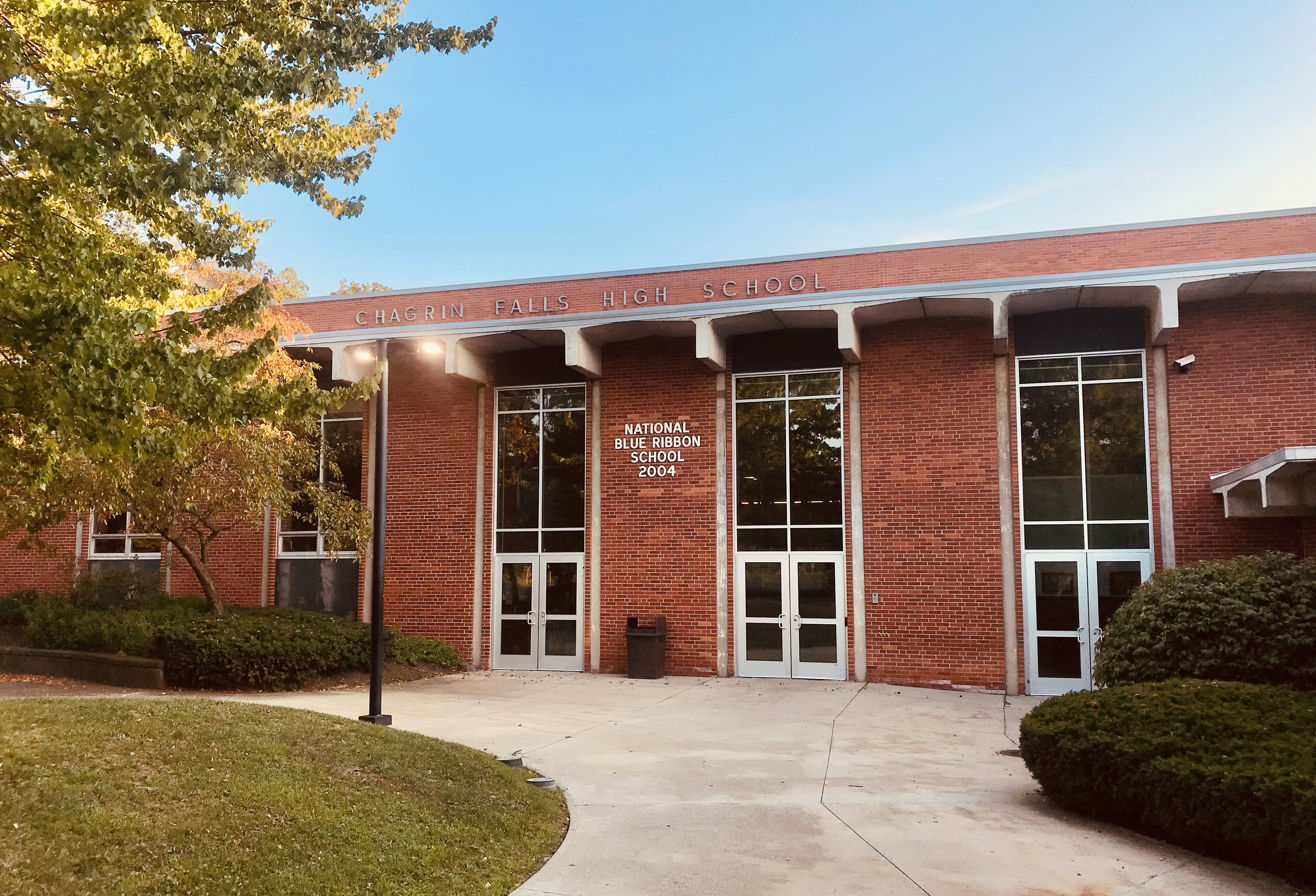

Location
- 400 East Washington Street; Chagrin Falls, Ohio 44022; United States; 41°25′36″N 81°22′49″W

Information
- Type: Public high school
- School district: Chagrin Falls Exempted Village Schools
- School code: 360855
- Principal: Amanda Rassi
- Teaching staff: 36.80 (FTE)
- Grades: 9–12
- Enrollment: 562 (2023–2024)
- Student to teacher ratio: 15.27
- Colors: Orange & Black
- Athletics conference: Chagrin Valley Conference
- Mascot: Mortimer The Tiger
- Team name: Tigers
- Rivals: West Geauga High School, Kenston High School
- Accreditation: North Central Association of Colleges and Schools
- Yearbook: Zenith
- Website: www.chagrinschools.org/o/cfhs

Chagrin Falls High School is a public high school located in Chagrin Falls, Ohio, United States, an eastern suburb in the Greater Cleveland metropolitan area. The high school's mascot is Mortimer the Tiger.

== History ==
Chagrin Falls High School issued its first diploma in 1879, with only one graduate, Hugh Christian. The first group to graduate was in 1888, a class of four people. As of 2011, the high school has graduated over 10,000 students.

== Awards and recognition ==
During the 2004-05 school year, Chagrin Falls High School was recognized with the Blue Ribbon School Award of Excellence by the United States Department of Education, the highest award an American school can receive.

In 2008, it was placed 135th on Newsweek magazine's Top 1,300 Schools list (2nd in Greater Cleveland, behind neighboring high school Solon, and 5th in Ohio). In 2011, it climbed to 92nd in the year ratings.

== Athletics ==
The school is a member of the Chagrin Valley Conference (CVC), Chagrin Division as part of the Ohio High School Athletic Association (OHSAA) for interscholastic sports.

=== State championships ===
- Boys Cross Country - 1971
- Girls Cross Country - 1991
- Girls Soccer - 1996, 2021
- Girls Basketball - 1998
- Boys Lacrosse - 2003 2015, 2019

== Notable alumni ==
- Tim Conway, actor, Golden Globe and Emmy awards for role on The Carol Burnett Show
- Casey Cott, actor, lead role on Riverdale (Class of 2010)
- Corey Cott, actor, lead roles in Newsies and Bandstand and on Law and Order: SVU (Class of 2008)
- John Miller, contemporary artist (Class of 1972)
- Dave Mullins, Pixar animator and director, Academy Award-winning animated short War is Over! (Class of 1989)
- Diana Munz, swimmer, three-time Olympic medalist (Class of 2000)
- Kevin P. Ryan, investor, founder of Business Insider (Class of 1981)
- Lee Unkrich, Pixar animator and director, Academy Award-winning animated features Toy Story 3 and Coco (Class of 1985)
- Fred Van Lente, comic book author (Class of 1990)
- Bill Watterson, Calvin and Hobbes cartoonist (Class of 1976)
