= St. John the Baptist Parish, Louisiana =

Parish in Louisiana, United States

- Parish
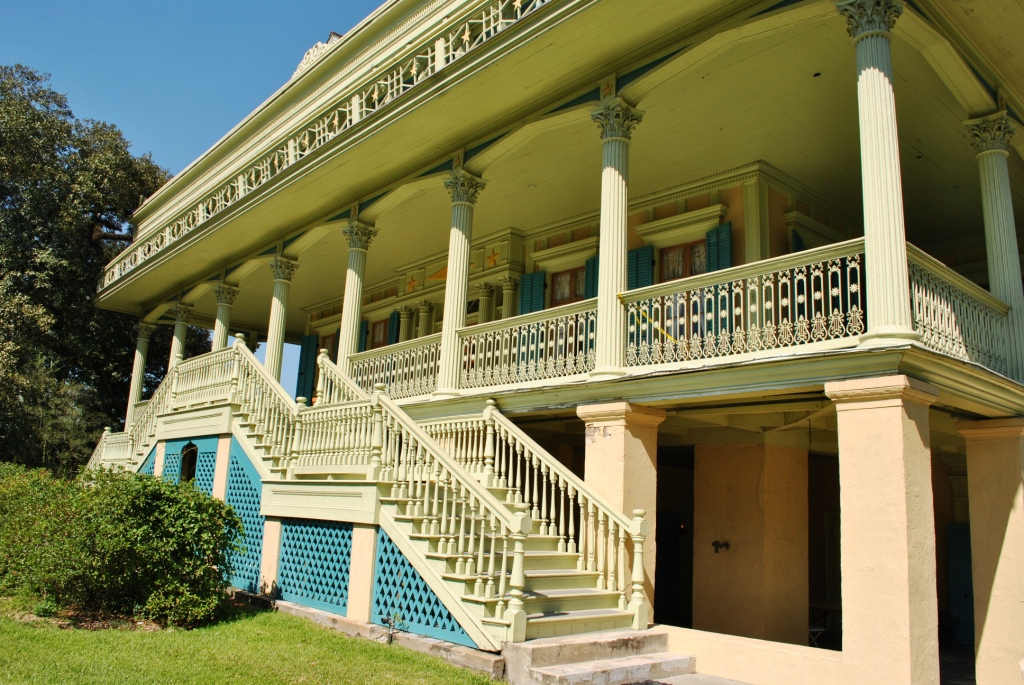
- San Francisco Plantation House

- Seal Logo
- Motto: "Heart of the River Parishes"
- Location within the U.S. state of Louisiana
- Coordinates: 30°07′N 90°30′W
- Country: United States
- State: Louisiana
- Founded: 1807
- Named for: St. John the Baptist Catholic Church in Edgard, built 1772
- Seat: Edgard
- Largest community: LaPlace

Area
  - Total: 348 sq mi (900 km^{2})
  - Land: 213 sq mi (550 km^{2})
  - Water: 135 sq mi (350 km^{2}) 39%

Population (2020)
  - Total: 42,477
  - Estimate (2025): 39,875 ▼
  - Density: 200/sq mi (77/km^{2})
- Time zone: UTC−6 (Central)
  - Summer (DST): UTC−5 (CDT)
- Congressional districts: 2nd, 6th
- Website: www.sjbparish.gov

St. John the Baptist Parish (SJBP) is a parish located in the U.S. state of Louisiana. At the 2020 census, the population was 42,477. The parish seat is Edgard, an unincorporated area, and the largest city is LaPlace, which is also unincorporated.

== History ==
St. John the Baptist Parish was established in 1807 as one of the original 19 parishes of the Territory of Orleans, which became the state of Louisiana. St. John the Baptist Parish is part of the New Orleans–Metairie metropolitan statistical area.

The parish was considered part of the German Coast in the 18th and 19th centuries, named for numerous German immigrants who settled along the Mississippi River here in the 1720s. On January 8, 1811, the largest slave insurrection in US history, known as the German Coast Uprising, started here. It was short-lived, but more than 200 slaves gathered from plantations along the river and marched through St. Charles Parish toward New Orleans. This is part of the Sugarland or sugar parishes, which were devoted to sugar cane cultivation. Planters held large numbers of enslaved African Americans as workers before the Civil War. Many freedmen stayed in the area after emancipation because of their ties to family and associates. They worked as tenant farmers, and numerous freedmen stayed in the area to work on these plantations afterward.

The parish includes three nationally significant examples of 19th-century plantation architecture: Evergreen Plantation, the Whitney Plantation Historic District, and San Francisco Plantation House.

Present-day St. John the Baptist Parish includes the third permanent settlement in what is now the state of Louisiana, after Natchitoches (1714) and New Orleans (1718). It was considered part of the German Coast. The area was settled in the early 1720s by a group of German Catholic colonists. Many families established settlements close to the Mississippi River in the areas now known as Lucy, Garyville, and Reserve. The area was under the French regime until 1763, when France ceded Louisiana to Spain after losing the Seven Years' War to Great Britain (this was known as the French and Indian War on the North American front).

At the beginning of the Spanish colonial period, many Acadians, people of French descent, began arriving in south Louisiana due to being expelled by the British from what is now Nova Scotia and eastern Canada. The British took over French territory in Canada and in North America east of the Mississippi River. The first Acadian village in Louisiana was established in what is now Wallace. The German and French cultures thrived alongside one another, but French came to be the dominant language. They developed a culture known as Cajun.

In 1769, the Acadians who settled in the area began a search for land to build a church. The governing Spanish authority at the time approved the request, and the land was expropriated on February 21, 1770. The first church stood in the same location as the modern St. John the Baptist Church. The new church carried the same name as the original chapel of the German Coast settlement.

The first pastor was Spanish Capuchin Father Bernardo de Limpach. The first church records note a marriage between Antoine Manz and Sibylla Bischof in 1772. The first church survived until being swept away by floodwaters in 1821.

The early settlers in the area received land grants from the Spanish or French royal governments, depending upon which country ruled the territory at the time of application. The French style of property allotments was made up of narrow frontage on the river so that each plantation had access for transportation of goods to and from New Orleans and world markets. The main house and supporting outbuildings were constructed near the river. The remaining property extended away from the river deeply into the wetlands, where land was cleared for the cultivation of sugar cane.

For decades into the 19th century, most transportation was done by boat, mainly on the bayous and lakes of the area, but via the Mississippi River as well. St. John, with its fertile land being nine feet above sea level, proved to be an excellent settlement for farming and agriculture. In the late 18th century, planters began to invest more in labor-intensive sugar cane cultivation and processing, increasing their demand for slave labor. Sugar production meant prosperity for the planters and New Orleans. Planters held large numbers of enslaved African Americans. The sugar and cotton parishes all had majority Black populations before the Civil War.

With the sugar wealth, some wealthy planters built elaborate houses and outbuildings. Three survive in St. John parish; each is recognized for its national architectural and historic significance. On the west bank is the major complex of houses and outbuildings designated as the Whitney Plantation Historic District and the National Historic Landmark (NHL) of Evergreen Plantation. San Francisco Plantation House, also a designated NHL, is on the east bank.

San Francisco and Evergreen plantations are open to the public for tours. The Whitney plantation house is planned for renovation. Whitney and Evergreen plantations are both included among the first 26 sites on the Louisiana African American Heritage Trail.

In January 1811, the German Coast Uprising started in this parish. It was the largest slave insurrection in US history, but it was short-lived. The slaves killed two whites, but suffered 96 deaths among their forces at the hands of the militia and in executions after quick trials afterward. They attacked five plantations and burned three houses to the ground. A major leader was Charles Deslondes, a mulatto (mixed-race) slave brought by a planter from Saint-Domingue in the late 18th century. He and his followers were influenced by the ideals and promises of the French and Haitian revolutions. France ended slavery on Saint-Domingue after its own Revolution, but tried to reimpose it. Slaves and free people of color rebelled, gaining independence after huge losses among French regular forces sent by Napoleon to retake the island.

In 1863 Abraham Lincoln mentioned St. John the Baptist Parish in the Emancipation Proclamation as a confederate parish.

Deslondes gathered more than 200 slaves from plantations along the way, marching downriver into St. Charles Parish toward New Orleans before meeting much resistance. Unable to get the arms they had planned on, the slaves were defeated by the well-armed informal and territorial militias. During these confrontations and even more by summary executions after brief trials, Deslondes and ninety-five slaves were killed. Decades before the American Civil War and emancipation, the actions of these people expressed African Americans' deep desire for freedom.

As the number of white families in the settlement increased, they wanted education for their children. Before the Civil War, typically planters would hire tutors, often college graduates from the North, who would live with the family for an extended period of time, typically two years. The tutor would teach all of the planter's children, and sometimes the family would arrange for other neighborhood children to join the classes as well. There was no public education.

In 1869, following the Civil War, families wanting French instruction founded private schools to continue their culture. The Anglo-Americans had imposed English as the official language. The Reconstruction legislature, with both African American and white representatives, established the first public schools in the state during this period. It took time for the state to arrange adequate funding for public education. In the segregated system, education for Black children was less well funded and lagged behind that for whites. The first high schools at Edgard and Reserve were not built until 1909. Students traveled to the schools by horse-drawn buses or by train.

== Geography ==
According to the U.S. Census Bureau, the parish has a total area of 348 square miles (900 km^{2}), of which 213 square miles (550 km^{2}) (61%) are land and 135 square miles (350 km^{2}) (39%) are water. It is the third-smallest parish in Louisiana by land area and fifth-smallest by total area.

St. John the Baptist Parish, Louisiana is located on the Mississippi River, approximately 130 miles (210 km) upriver from the Gulf of Mexico and 30 miles (48 km) upriver from the City of New Orleans. The area, known as the River Region, has an abundance of natural resources and a mild "Sunbelt" climate. The average monthly temperature in New Orleans ranges from 55.1 °F (12.8 °C) in January to 83.7 °F (28.7 °C) in July, and rainfall averages 53.2 inches (135 cm) per year with monthly averages running from 2.52 inches (6.4 cm) in October to 7.17 inches (18.2 cm) in July. The New Orleans/River Region contains a good supply of raw materials, which has helped Louisiana maintain a high rank in the United States in the production of natural gas, petroleum, sulfur, salt, and fur pelts. High silica sands, lime, clays, timber, seafood, and various agricultural products are also produced in abundance.

St. John the Baptist Parish is bisected by the Mississippi River. Though the River separates the Parish into northern and southern parts, the former is still referred to as the "east bank" and the latter as the "west bank," referring to the direction of the river as it reaches the Gulf of Mexico. The Mississippi provides an important transportation corridor that supports the heavy industry located in the area.

St. John the Baptist Parish is bordered by St. Charles Parish and Lake Pontchartrain to the east, Lake Pontchartrain and Lake Maurepas to the north, Lafourche Parish and Lac des Allemands to the south, and St. James Parish to the west. It is one of four parishes which comprise the "River Parishes;" St. John Parish is the heart of the "River Parishes."

This section of the state, also consisting of St. James, Ascension, and St. Charles Parishes, makes up the area along the Mississippi River between New Orleans and Baton Rouge. Since the mid-20th century, when the oil industry developed from resources found here, all of these parishes are home to at least one major chemical- and/or petroleum-processing facility. The industry is the major source of employment in the region but it has had adverse environmental effects. St. John the Baptist parish has the highest rate of environmental cancer of any census tract in the United States.

Much of the parish is either open water or wetlands. The wetlands are currently protected by federal law and development is limited to what is permitted by the U.S. Army Corps of Engineers and/or the Federal Wildlife and Fisheries Department.

Higher ground in the parish is found in an alluvial plain which generally borders the Mississippi River on both sides. Soil deposits from the Mississippi's annual flooding created a rich and fertile area which has historically been intensively farmed (sugar cane, soybeans, feed corn, and occasional cotton). This fact, as well as the natural transportation corridor supplied by the river, resulted in the creation of numerous plantations and farms along the lower Mississippi Valley.

Many of these plantations were large tracts of land with modest or average-sized homes and outbuildings found on the higher ground. Several, however, were improved with palatial mansions. Three of the larger homes have survived in St. John Parish, as noted in the History above.

The higher ground along the banks was used to grow crops, while the wetlands were valued for their abundant timber, hunting, and fishing. For years, development in the River Parishes was limited to those areas that were naturally higher and less prone to flooding. Until the existing levees and pump systems were built, however, few places were truly safe from high water. Even today, most of the parish is considered a flood hazard area according to FEMA Flood Maps.

=== Adjacent parishes ===
- Tangipahoa Parish (north)
- St. Charles Parish (southeast)
- Lafourche Parish (south)
- St. James Parish (west)
- Ascension Parish (northwest)
- Livingston Parish (northwest)

== Communities ==
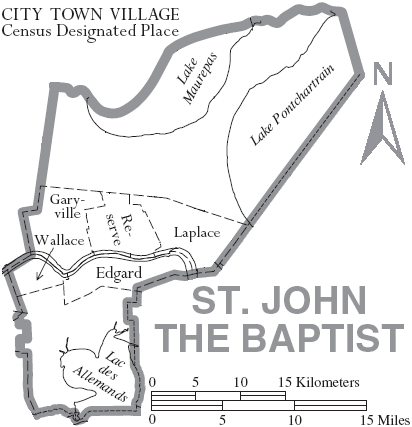
Map of St. John the Baptist Parish, Louisiana With Municipal Labels

St. John the Baptist Parish has no incorporated areas.

=== Census-designated places ===
- Edgard
- Garyville
- LaPlace
- Pleasure Bend
- Reserve
- Wallace

=== Unincorporated communities ===
- Mount Airy
- Welcome
- Dutch Bayou
- Cornland
- Lions

=== Ghost towns ===
- St. John the Baptist Parish had two more communities on its east bank, Ruddock and Frenier, which were settled on the isthmus between Lake Maurepas and Lake Pontchartrain, 10 miles (16 km) NNE of LaPlace. In 1892, Ruddock founded by the Ruddock Cypress Company was made into a sawmill town. In September 1915, the 1915 New Orleans Hurricane hit Ruddock and the nearby town of Frenier, destroying the towns and killing some of the residents. Today, Ruddock and Frenier are ghost towns in the parish as well as memorials to themselves. All that remains of Ruddock is rotted wood from buildings and vegetation. Yet, Frenier still has a few seafood restaurants and a small number of houses all of which are built high to prevent flooding. Nevertheless, Ruddock is still marked on an I-55 exit sign and both cities are seen on Louisiana road maps, and Frenier still has an entrance sign on Highway 51 marking it as a fishing village. It can be seen off I-10 on Lake Pontchartrain.

== Demographics ==
Historical population
Census	Pop.	Note	%±
1820	3,854		—
1830	5,677		47.3%
1840	5,776		1.7%
1850	7,317		26.7%
1860	7,930		8.4%
1870	6,762		−14.7%
1880	9,686		43.2%
1890	11,359		17.3%
1900	12,330		8.5%
1910	14,338		16.3%
1920	11,896		−17.0%
1930	14,078		18.3%
1940	14,766		4.9%
1950	14,861		0.6%
1960	18,439		24.1%
1970	23,813		29.1%
1980	31,924		34.1%
1990	39,996		25.3%
2000	43,044		7.6%
2010	45,924		6.7%
2020	42,477		−7.5%
2025 (est.)	39,875	▼	−6.1%
U.S. Decennial Census; 1790-1960 1900-1990; 1990-2000 2010-2013

St. John the Baptist Parish, Louisiana – Racial and ethnic composition Note: the U.S. Census Bureau treats Hispanic/Latino as an ethnic category. This table excludes Latinos from the racial categories and assigns them to a separate category. Hispanics/Latinos may be of any race.
Race / Ethnicity (NH = Non-Hispanic)	Pop 1980	Pop 1990	Pop 2000	Pop 2010	Pop 2020	% 1980	% 1990	% 2000	% 2010	% 2020
White alone (NH)	19,152	24,399	21,946	18,374	13,348	59.99%	61.00%	50.99%	40.01%	31.42%
Black or African American alone (NH)	11,992	14,369	19,204	24,405	24,076	37.56%	35.93%	44.61%	53.14%	56.68%
Native American or Alaska Native alone (NH)	36	97	100	116	105	0.11%	0.24%	0.23%	0.25%	0.25%
Asian alone (NH)	53	151	222	312	314	0.17%	0.38%	0.52%	0.68%	0.74%
Native Hawaiian or Pacific Islander alone (NH)	x	x	10	21	7	x	x	0.02%	0.05%	0.02%
Other race alone (NH)	13	26	31	51	140	0.04%	0.07%	0.07%	0.11%	0.33%
Mixed race or Multiracial (NH)	x	x	301	470	1,196	x	x	0.70%	1.02%	2.82%
Hispanic or Latino (any race)	678	954	1,230	2,175	3,291	2.12%	2.39%	2.86%	4.74%	7.75%
Total	31,924	39,996	43,044	45,924	42,477	100.00%	100.00%	100.00%	100.00%	100.00%

The 2019 census estimates determined that 42,242 people lived in the parish. The racial and ethnic makeup of the parish was 56.5% Black and African American, 38.2% non-Hispanic white, 1.1% Asian, 2.7% some other race, and 1.5% multiracial; of the population, 6.1% were Hispanic and Latin American of any race. Among the population, Spanish was the second most-spoken language as of 2019; approximately 4.0% of the parish population were foreign-born. French ancestry was the largest heritage among the parish population (9.7%).

In 2019, there were 15,720 households living in 17,778 housing units. There were also 3,758 businesses operating in the parish, with the majority being minority-owned. The parish had an employment rate of 56.2% in 2019, and 78.5% of the population lived in owner-occupied units. The median home value was $153,900, and median gross rent was $933. The median household income was $57,429; males had a median income of $53,849 versus $36,476 for females. An estimated 24.8% of the population lived at or below the poverty line.

By the publication of the 2020 United States census, there were 42,477 people, 15,270 households, and 11,104 families residing in the parish. Among the parish population, 56.68% of the population were Black and African American, 31.42% non-Hispanic white, 0.25% Native American, 0.74% Asian, 0.02% Pacific Islander, 3.15% multiracial or some other race, and 7.75% Hispanic or Latin American of any race. The increase in Hispanic or Latinos and other non-White Americans has been attributed to a nationwide demographic shift. Of Louisiana's 64 parishes, it is one of six that have an African-American majority (2020).

According to the Association of Religion Data Archives in 2020, with Christianity being the predominant religion, Roman Catholics numbered 15,068 adherents—remaining the historically largest single Christian denomination for the parish. Non- or inter-denominational churches spread among the independent congregationalist, Bible, and United and Uniting churches were the second largest Christian group, numbering 7,230; the increase in non/inter-denominational Protestant Christianity reflected increasing ecumenical trends throughout the state.

== Government ==
Parish Administration	Administrators
Parish President	Jaclyn S. Hotard
Sheriff	Michael K. Tregre
Coroner	Dr. Christy Montegut
Assessor	Lucien J. Gauff, III
School Board Superintendent	Dr. Cleo Perry

Parish Council	Councilmembers
Council Chairman	Tammy Houston
Council Vice-chair	Robert J. Arcuri
Council Seat At Large, Division A	Lennix Madere, Jr.
Council Seat At Large, Division B	Michael Wright
Council Seat District I	Virgie Jarrow Johnson
Council Seat District II	Warren "Bosco" Torres Jr.
Council Seat District III	Tammy Houston
Council Seat District IV	Tyra Duhe-Griffin
Council Seat District V	Robert J. Arcuri
Council Seat District VI	Vernon Bailey, Sr.
Council Seat District VII	Dixie Ramirez

40th Judicial District	Parish Judicial Leaders
Judge of Division "A"	Vercell Fiffie
Judge of Division "B"	Nghana Lewis
Judge of Division "C"	Sterling Snowdy
5th Circuit Court of Appeal, Judge of Division "H"	Jude Gravois
District Attorney	Bridget A. Dinvaut
Clerk of Court	Eliana DeFrancesch

Senators & Representatives	Names	Notes
State Senator	Edward J. Price D-2 D	
State Senator	Gregory A. Miller D-19 R	
State Representative	Sylvia Elaine Taylor D-57 D	
State Representative	Jeff Wiley D-81 R	
State Representative	Beth Billings D-56 R	
U.S. Senator	Bill Cassidy R	
U.S. Senator	John Kennedy R	
U.S.Representative	Cleo Fields 6th District D	
U.S.Representative	Troy Carter 2nd District D	

Parish School Board	Board Members
Board President	Debbie Schum
Board Vice President	Shawn Wallace
District I	Charo Holden
District II	Albert Burl, III
District III	Patricia Triche
District IV	Raydel Morris
District V	Sherry DeFrancesch
District VI	Jennifer Frizzell
District VII	Samuel Mamou
District VIII	Debbie Schum
District IX	Shawn Wallace
District X	Nia Mitchell
District XI	Lindsey Vicknair

St. John the Baptist Parish leans heavily towards the Democratic Party. It has not voted for a Republican presidential candidate since Ronald Reagan in 1984 and, before that, voted Republican only three other times in the 20th century: for Warren G. Harding in 1920, when Acadian voters broke with President Woodrow Wilson over various issues, for Dwight D. Eisenhower in 1956, when he flipped the state as a whole, and for Richard Nixon in 1972, when he won all but one parish in Louisiana. It also supported the third-party bid of George Wallace in 1968.

Prior to the passage of the 1898 constitution, which almost completely disenfranchised black voters and made Louisiana an effective one-party state, St. John the Baptist Parish generally voted Republican. In fact, it did so in every presidential election from 1872 until 1896.

At the state level, the parish is also heavily Democratic. St. John the Baptist was Governor John Bel Edwards' second strongest in the 2019 election, giving him 74% of the vote.

United States presidential election results for St. John the Baptist Parish, Louisiana
Year	Republican		Democratic		Third party(ies)	
Year	No.	%	No.	%	No.	%
1912	74	23.87%	190	61.29%	46	14.84%
1916	115	27.91%	289	70.15%	8	1.94%
1920	250	51.12%	239	48.88%	0	0.00%
1924	194	36.60%	336	63.40%	0	0.00%
1928	118	10.84%	971	89.16%	0	0.00%
1932	176	17.53%	799	79.58%	29	2.89%
1936	262	13.07%	1,742	86.93%	0	0.00%
1940	285	19.30%	1,192	80.70%	0	0.00%
1944	195	12.84%	1,324	87.16%	0	0.00%
1948	379	20.16%	799	42.50%	702	37.34%
1952	654	23.47%	2,132	76.53%	0	0.00%
1956	1,372	50.55%	1,278	47.09%	64	2.36%
1960	488	10.34%	3,782	80.13%	450	9.53%
1964	1,694	29.97%	3,958	70.03%	0	0.00%
1968	940	12.65%	3,245	43.67%	3,246	43.68%
1972	3,525	49.75%	2,815	39.73%	746	10.53%
1976	3,597	37.43%	5,700	59.32%	312	3.25%
1980	5,819	41.98%	7,647	55.17%	395	2.85%
1984	9,093	53.96%	7,646	45.37%	112	0.66%
1988	7,464	46.02%	8,366	51.58%	389	2.40%
1992	6,730	37.70%	8,977	50.29%	2,144	12.01%
1996	6,025	35.34%	9,937	58.28%	1,089	6.39%
2000	7,423	41.91%	9,745	55.02%	545	3.08%
2004	9,039	46.08%	10,305	52.53%	273	1.39%
2008	8,912	41.15%	12,424	57.37%	320	1.48%
2012	7,620	36.07%	13,179	62.39%	324	1.53%
2016	7,569	36.49%	12,661	61.04%	513	2.47%
2020	7,538	35.17%	13,582	63.37%	312	1.46%
2024	6,557	34.83%	12,043	63.97%	227	1.21%

== Economy ==
As part of the River Parishes regional economy, the River Region Chamber of Commerce is headquartered in LaPlace, the parish seat of St. John the Baptist Parish. Founded in 2004, the Chamber serves businesses and community organizations across St. Charles, St. John the Baptist, and St. James parishes, supporting business networking, workforce development initiatives, and regional economic and public policy advocacy within the River Parishes.

== Education ==
The St. John the Baptist Parish School Board is the school district for the entire parish, and it operates ten public schools within the parish. In addition, the Archdiocese of New Orleans oversees five religious schools within the parish, and there are two privately run schools within the parish.

Public Schools	City/Town	2013-2014 Letter Grade (SPS)	Change from 2012 to 2013 grade
Laplace Elementary/Middle School	LaPlace	B (89.0)	+2.90
Garyville-Mt. Airy Math and Science Magnet School	Garyville/Mt. Airy	C (73.7)	-0.50
Fifth Ward Elementary School	Reserve	C (71.5)	+3.50
East St. John Elementary/Middle School	Reserve	C (79.4)	+3.20
Emily C. Watkins Elementary/Middle School	LaPlace	C (80.6)	+14.30
John L. Ory Communications Magnet School	LaPlace	A (106.7)	-2.50
Lake Pontchartrain Elementary/Middle School	LaPlace	D (61.3)	-11.30
West St. John Elementary/Middle School	Edgard	D (62.8)	+1.90
East St. John High School	Reserve	C (75.8)	N/A
West St. John High School	Edgard	B (98.6)	+6.90

http://www.louisianabelieves.com/data/reportcards/2013/

Religious Schools	City/Town
Ascension of Our Lord Catholic Elementary/Middle School	LaPlace
St. Joan of Arc Catholic Elementary/Middle School	LaPlace
St. Peter's Catholic Elementary/Middle School	Reserve
Our Lady of Grace Catholic Elementary/Middle School	Reserve
St. Charles Catholic High School	LaPlace
St. Timothy's Episcopal School	LaPlace

Private Schools	City/Town
Reserve Christian Elementary/Middle School	Reserve
Riverside Academy K-12	Reserve

It is in the service area of Delgado Community College.

== National Guard ==
The 1084th Transportation Company of the 165th CSS Battalion of the Louisiana National Guard resides in Reserve, Louisiana.

== Transportation ==
=== Major highways ===
- Interstate 10
- Interstate 55
- U.S. Highway 51
- U.S. Highway 61
- Louisiana Highway 18
- Louisiana Highway 44
- Louisiana Highway 53
- Louisiana Highway 54
- Louisiana Highway 628
- Louisiana Highway 636-1
- Louisiana Highway 636-3
- Louisiana Highway 637
- Louisiana Highway 640
- Louisiana Highway 643
- Louisiana Highway 644
- Louisiana Highway 3127
- Louisiana Highway 3179
- Louisiana Highway 3188
- Louisiana Highway 3213
- Louisiana Highway 3224

East Bank - The primary artery on the east bank of St. John Parish is Airline Highway (U.S. Highway 61). This five-lane, asphalt-paved road was once the predominant route linking Baton Rouge and New Orleans. Though it is still heavily traveled, much of the New Orleans-Baton Rouge traffic has been diverted to Interstate 10, located in the northern part of the parish. Interstate 10, a divided, controlled-access highway, has two interchanges in St. John Parish; one at Belle Terre Boulevard and the second at U.S. Highway 51/Interstate 55, both in LaPlace. Both Belle Terre Boulevard and Highway 51 intersect Airline Highway approximately 3.5 miles (5.6 km) south of Interstate 10.

Interstate 55, a north–south route leading to Jackson, Mississippi, and beyond, intersects Interstate 10 in the northeastern sector of LaPlace. A third Interstate 10 interchange exists just west of the St. John Parish line near Gramercy (St. James Parish).

River Road, also known as Jefferson Highway or Louisiana Highway 44, is a two-lane, asphalt-paved, winding highway which parallels the Mississippi River. Most of the heavy industry in the parish fronts on this road.

West Bank - Most of the development on the west bank lies along Louisiana Highway 18 (the Great River Road), a two-lane, asphalt-paved highway which parallels the Mississippi River similarly to Highway 44 on the east bank. In addition to Louisiana 18, the west bank has Louisiana Highway 3127 or the River Parishes Highway, which is roughly equivalent to the east bank's Airline Highway in that it follows the Mississippi. It is not as winding nor as populated as River Road. Highway 3127 leads to Donaldsonville upriver from St. John Parish. It is home of the "Sunshine Bridge" over the Mississippi River in Ascension Parish. This road has little development on either side and is generally surrounded by wetlands in St. John Parish.

Veterans Memorial Bridge or Gramercy Bridge - (Louisiana Highway 3213) This bridge originates on the east bank of St. James Parish near Gramercy/Lutcher and has access to I-10 and Airline Highway via Louisiana Highway 641. The foot of the bridge on the west bank is in St. John Parish near Wallace, with a tie-in to Louisiana Highway 3127 that opened June 18, 2008. The opening of this bridge has spurred the development hoped for along the west bank of St. John Parish. (The bridge is known as the "Bridge to Nowhere.")

Access to the west bank of St. John Parish is also provided by a ferry crossing at Reserve/Edgard and by the Hale Boggs Memorial Bridge over the Mississippi in St. Charles Parish.

== See also ==
- National Register of Historic Places listings in St. John the Baptist Parish, Louisiana
- German Coast
  - 1811 German Coast Uprising
- River Parishes
