= National Register of Historic Places listings in St. John the Baptist Parish, Louisiana =

Location of St. John the Baptist Parish in Louisiana

This is a list of the National Register of Historic Places listings in St. John the Baptist Parish, Louisiana.

This is intended to be a complete list of the properties and districts on the National Register of Historic Places in St. John the Baptist Parish, Louisiana, United States. The locations of National Register properties and districts are included, along with their corresponding latitude and longitude coordinates, which can be seen on the map below.

There are 18 properties and districts listed on the National Register in the parish, including 2 National Historic Landmarks.

This National Park Service list is complete through NPS recent listings posted November 28, 2025.

== Current listings ==
	Name on the Register	Image	Date listed	Location	City or town	Description
1	Bacas House	Bacas House	May 17, 1990 (#90000786)	Louisiana Highway 18 east of Evergreen Plantation; 30°01′25″N 90°37′37″W	Edgard	
2	Bayou Jasmine Archeological Site		July 12, 1976 (#76002149)	Address Restricted	LaPlace	
3	E.J. Caire & Co. Store	E.J. Caire & Co. Store	November 29, 2001 (#01001268)	2403-2407 Louisiana Highway 18; 30°02′45″N 90°33′36″W	Edgard	Store begun by Jean Baptiste Caire (1823-1879) and operated for years by the late Etienne J. Caire, who died in 1955; it closed in the middle 1970s.
4	Dugas House	Dugas House	August 31, 1989 (#89001211)	Louisiana Highway 18; 30°02′10″N 90°36′09″W	Edgard	
5	Emilie Plantation House	Emilie Plantation House	January 13, 1989 (#88003135)	Louisiana Highway 44; 30°02′45″N 90°36′34″W	Garyville	
6	Evergreen Plantation	Evergreen Plantation	September 25, 1991 (#91001386)	Louisiana Highway 18 southeast of Fiftymile Pt. 30°01′06″N 90°38′50″W	Wallace	Comprising 37 buildings, including a main house and 22 extant slave cabins, Evergreen Plantation is an intact example of the major plantation complexes found during the antebellum era of the Southern United States. Open to visitors.
7	Garyville Historic District	Garyville Historic District	April 20, 1990 (#89001711)	Roughly bounded by Main, Bluebird, West, Azalea, Cypress, St. Francis, and N. Railroad Sts. 30°03′24″N 90°37′09″W	Garyville	
8	Godchaux-Reserve Plantation House	Godchaux-Reserve Plantation House	January 21, 1994 (#93001548)	1628 Louisiana Highway 44; 30°03′19″N 90°33′50″W	Reserve	
9	Graugnard House	Graugnard House	October 28, 1994 (#94001249)	2292 Louisiana Highway 44; 30°03′18″N 90°35′21″W	Reserve	
10	Haydel-Jones House	Haydel-Jones House	November 3, 2010 (#10000886)	2245 Louisiana Highway 18 (River Rd.); 30°02′46″N 90°34′02″W	Edgard	Louisiana's French Creole Architecture MPS
11	Hope Plantation House	Hope Plantation House	January 11, 2005 (#04001470)	109 S. Church St. 30°02′25″N 90°37′03″W	Garyville	
12	Montegut Plantation House	Montegut Plantation House	January 21, 1988 (#87002505)	402 E. 5th St. 30°03′31″N 90°28′51″W	LaPlace	
13	Our Lady of Grace Church	Our Lady of Grace Church	November 15, 2005 (#05001277)	Near the junction of Airline Highway and 3rd St. 30°04′23″N 90°33′23″W	Reserve	
14	San Francisco Plantation House	San Francisco Plantation House	May 30, 1974 (#74002186)	3 miles west of Reserve on Louisiana Highway 44; 30°02′57″N 90°36′20″W	Reserve	
15	Sorapuru House	Sorapuru House	August 20, 1999 (#99001014)	971 Louisiana Highway 18; 30°02′47″N 90°29′53″W	Edgard	
16	Southern Pacific Steam Locomotive #745	Southern Pacific Steam Locomotive #745	September 4, 1998 (#98001077)	Timbermill Museum; 29°58′01″N 90°08′37″W	Garyville	Restored 1921 Louisiana built steam locomotive; moved from Jefferson c. 2023.
17	Whitney Plantation Historic District	Whitney Plantation Historic District	November 24, 1992 (#92001566)	Louisiana Highway 18 east of Wallace; 30°02′21″N 90°39′02″W	Wallace	
18	Woodland Plantation	Woodland Plantation	October 4, 2017 (#100001712)	1128 Louisiana Highway 628; 30°03′41″N 90°28′56″W	LaPlace	

== See also ==
- List of National Historic Landmarks in Louisiana
- National Register of Historic Places listings in Louisiana
