= Jefferson College (Louisiana) =

- Manresa House of Retreats
- U.S. National Register of Historic Places
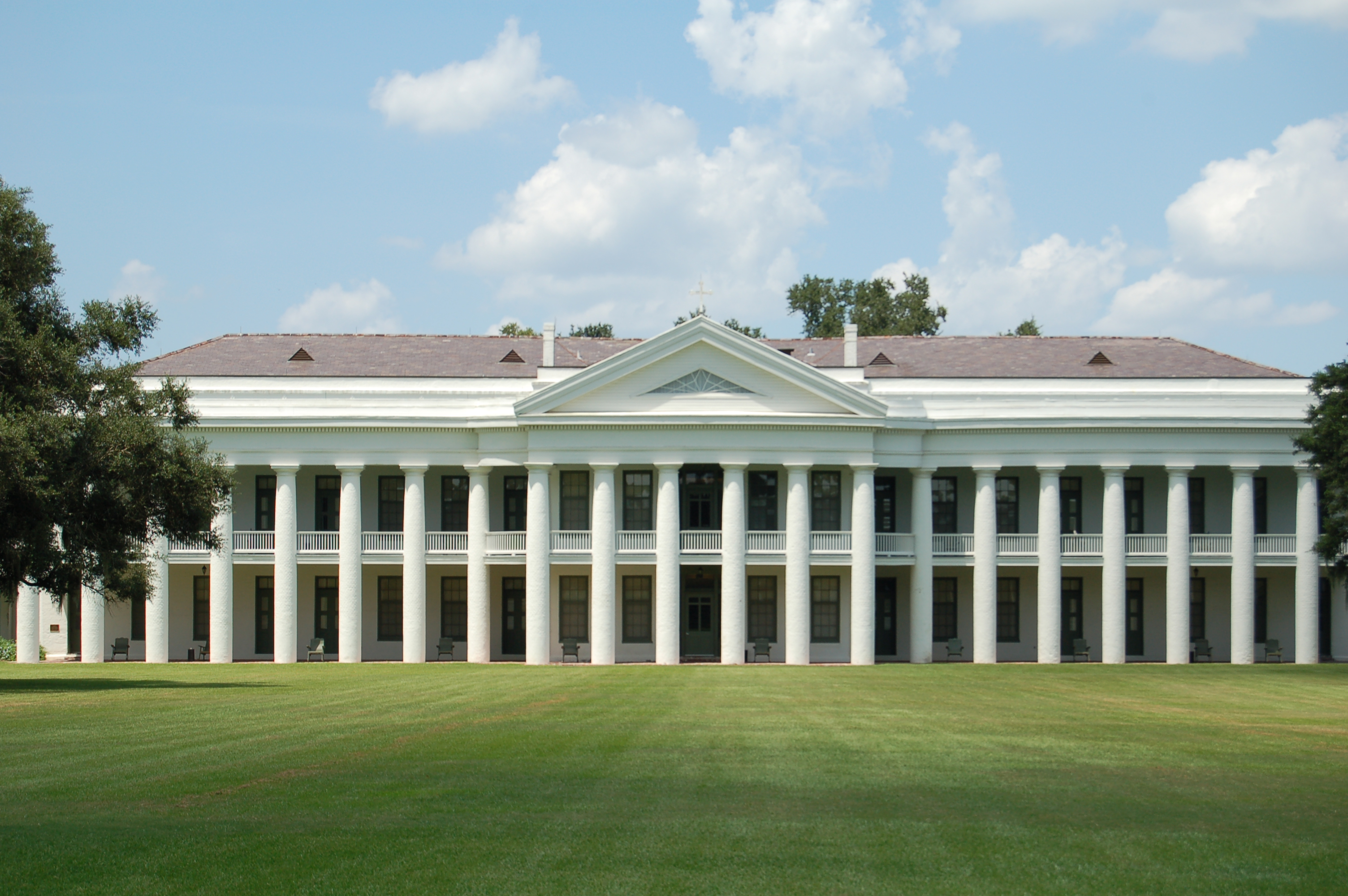
- The main building in 2010

- Location within Louisiana
- Location: 5858 Louisiana Highway 44; Convent, Louisiana
- Coordinates: 29°59′34″N 90°49′15″W
- Built: 1842
- Architectural style: Greek Revival
- Website: https://www.manresala.org/
- NRHP reference No.: 85000162
- Designated: January 31, 1985

Jefferson College was a college located in Convent, Louisiana, operating under various names between 1830 and 1928. In 1922, the Jesuit retreat center called Manresa House of Retreats began on the former campus. The site was added to the National Register of Historic Places in 1985.

== History ==
=== College of Jefferson ===
The institution was established as the College of Jefferson in 1830, and chartered in 1831. The first building was completed in 1833, and the inaugural class began studies in 1834. Operation of the institution was sporadic for a time. The building burned down in 1842, and a new building was erected on the same foundation later that year. American diplomat Alexander Hill Everett briefly served as its head thereafter. The institution then closed in 1848 due to low enrollment.

=== Louisiana College ===
A new institution operated in the location as Louisiana College from 1853 to 1856. In 1860, when it experienced financial difficulties and was on the verge of total collapse, plantation owner Valcour Aime rescued the complex by purchasing it. From 1860 to 1862, the campus operated for the first time under the name Jefferson College, and a chapel was added. From 1862 to 1864, the buildings were occupied by Federal troops.

=== St. Mary's College of Jefferson ===
In July 1864, the institution again reopened as St. Mary's College of Jefferson.

Aime gave the entire college to the Marist Fathers. According to some accounts, his motivation in securing this transfer to a sectarian entity was to prevent the state from obligating the school to open its doors to freed blacks. Another source states, as an alternative explanation, that Aime was merely "anxious to see the college re-opened", and therefore "gave his shares to the [priests] that they might conduct the school".

The school thereafter operated continuously until it again closed in 1928 due to low enrollment.

Among its alumni was Etienne J. Caire, who owned the E. J. Caire Store in Edgard and was the Republican gubernatorial nominee in 1928 against Huey Long.

=== Manresa House of Retreats ===
Caire founded the Manresa retreat center in 1922, now run by the Jesuits.

== Notable alumni ==
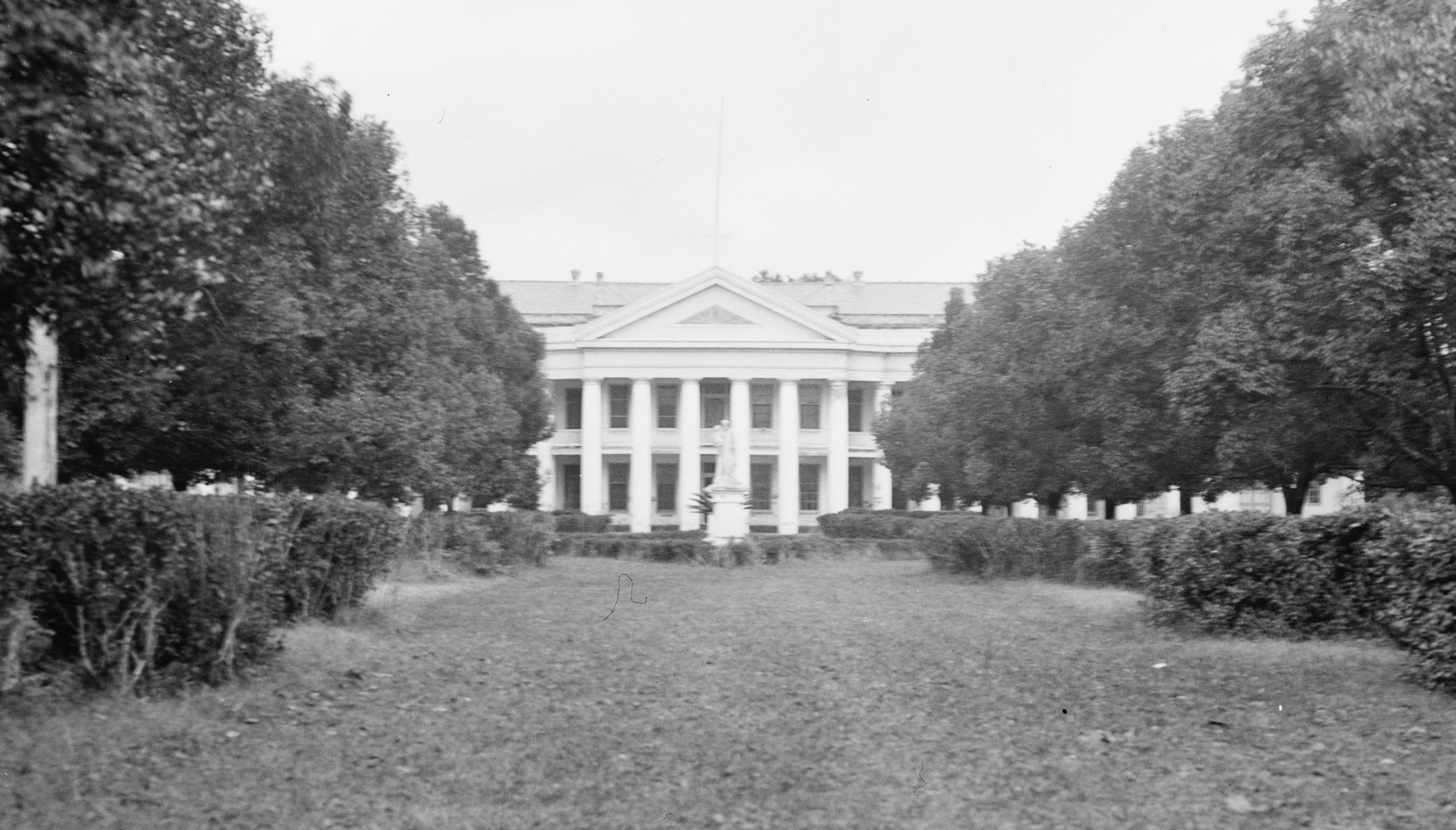
The main building of Jefferson College as it appeared in 1937.

- Etienne J. Caire, who owned the E. J. Caire Store in Edgard and was the Republican gubernatorial nominee in 1928 against Huey Long.
- Walter Guion, U.S. Senator
- Samuel A. LeBlanc, Louisiana Supreme Court Justice
- Paul Hébert, 14th Governor of Louisiana
- William Gillespie Wyly, Louisiana Supreme Court Justice.
