= E.J. Caire & Co. Store =

- Caire, E.J., & Co. Stores
- U.S. National Register of Historic Places
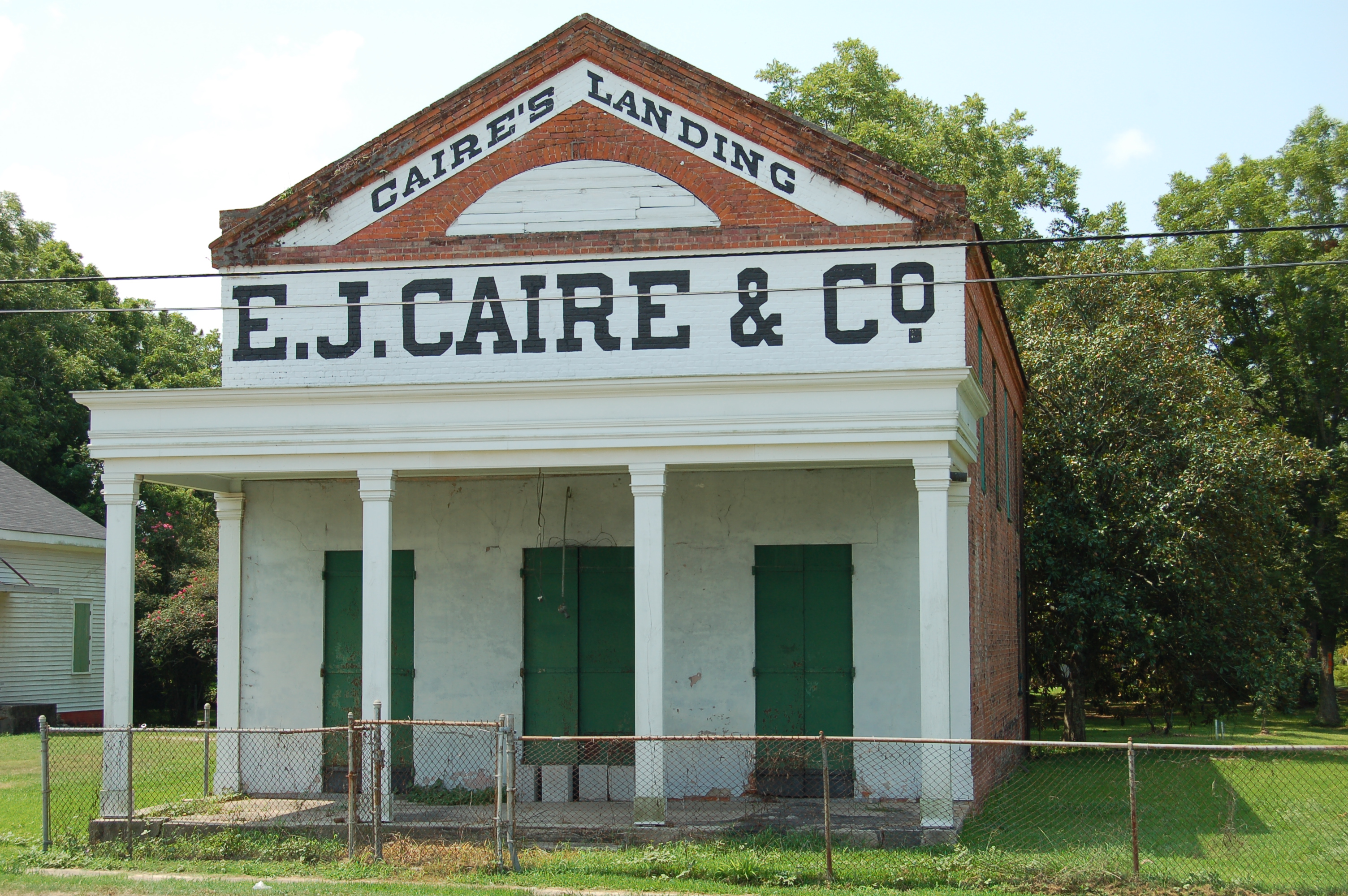

- Location within Louisiana
- Location: 2403-2407 LA 18, Edgard, Louisiana
- Coordinates: 30°02′45″N 90°33′36″W
- Area: 0.4 acres (0.16 ha)
- Built: 1855
- Architectural style: Greek Revival
- NRHP reference No.: 01001268
- Added to NRHP: November 29, 2001

The E.J. Caire & Co. Store, at 2403-2407 Louisiana Highway 18 in Edgard, in St. John the Baptist Parish, Louisiana, was built in 1855. It was listed on the National Register of Historic Places in 2001.

The Register's listing includes two store buildings located on the west bank of the Mississippi River. The buildings overlook River Road and the levee at "Caire's Landing", in the village of Edgard. The older is a two-story Greek Revival-style masonry building which was built around 1855 and was moved in 1881. The newer is a one-story frame building built in 1897.

The store was opened by Jean Baptiste Caire (1823-1879) and was operated for years by the late Etienne J. Caire, who died in 1955; it closed in the mid-1970s.
