= East St. John High School =

Location
- 1 Wildcat Drive; Reserve, Louisiana 70084; United States; 30.078629°N 90.531091°W

Information
- School type: Public
- Established: 1976
- School district: St. John the Baptist Parish School Board
- Director: Brandon Brown (Athletic Director)
- Principal: Christopher Mayes
- Teaching staff: 98.01 (FTE)
- Grades: 9-12
- Gender: Co-ed
- Enrollment: 1,467 (2023–2024)
- Average class size: 260-300
- Student to teacher ratio: 14.97
- Campus size: 1,500 Students
- Colors: Black and gold
- Athletics: Louisiana High School Athletic Association
- Athletics conference: District 7-5A
- Mascot: Wildcat
- Nickname: Wildcats
- Rivals: Destrehan Fighting Wildcats
- Website: esjh.stjohn.k12.la.us

East St. John High School is a high school in Reserve, an unincorporated area in St. John the Baptist Parish, Louisiana, United States. The school is a part of St. John the Baptist Parish Public Schools. As of 2013–2014, the school had 1,327 students.

== History ==
East St. John opened for the 1978–79 school year. The students had previously attended the second Leon Godchaux High School located in Reserve, Louisiana that first opened in 1930. The original Leon Godchaux High School was also located in Reserve, Louisiana and both Leon Godchaux campuses were also referred to as "Reserve High School".

Fifth Ward High School was an all-black secondary school located in Reserve that opened in 1950. After the school closed in 1969, its students moved to Leon Godchaux High School.

In 2012, Hurricane Isaac damaged the facility with floodwaters. While preparations were made to restore the permanent main school facility, students in grades 10-12 were temporarily at Leon Godchaux Junior High School. The hurricane did not damage the 9th-grade facility, and so 9th-grade students continued using it.

In 2013 some parents protested what they perceived as an inadequately quick speed in restoring the school. The district selected Hammerman and Gainer, Inc. (HGI) as the supervisor of the construction, but the Louisiana Licensing Board for Contractors stated that the company lacked the needed licensing, and the firm later did not pursue the contract further.

The district began work after, in 2014, it selected Finally All South Consulting as the supervisor. On July 17, 2015 the school district stated that renovation work was done, with the first classes to be held in August. The post-hurricane renovated main school facility opened in 2015, and the school had an opening ceremony. The cost of renovating it was $18,500,000.

In 2020, David Lewis became the principal.

== Extracurricular activities ==
- 4-H
- Beta
- Cheerleaders
- Flag Team
- Majorettes
- Marching Wildcats
- Student Council

== Athletics ==
East St. John High athletics competes in the LHSAA.

- Basketball - Boys
- Basketball - Girls
- Football
- Power Lifting
- Softball
- Track - Boys
- Track - Girls
- Volleyball

State Championships
East St. John
Football: 1980

Baseball: 1990, 1992

Leon Godchaux
Football: 1958

- Joe Keller - LHSAA Hall of Fame head football coach, Joe Keller, was the head coach at Leon Godchaux from 1934 to 1970. During his thirty-eight seasons at the school, he compiled a 262–73–15 record and won fifteen district championships and a state championship in 1958. The East St. John football stadium is named after Keller.

== Notable alumni ==
- Dontae Fleming, NFL wide receiver
- Patrick Lewis, NFL offensive lineman
- Louis Lipps, NFL wide receiver
- Jackie Marshall, NFL defensive tackle
- Jarius Monroe, NFL cornerback
- Ryan Perrilloux, NFL quarterback
- DeQuincy Scott, NFL defensive lineman
- Duke Williams, NFL and CFL wide receiver
- Gerald Williams, MLB outfielder
- Roydell Williams NFL wide receiver
