= Whitney Plantation Historic District =

Historic district in Louisiana, United States

- U.S. National Register of Historic Places
- U.S. Historic district
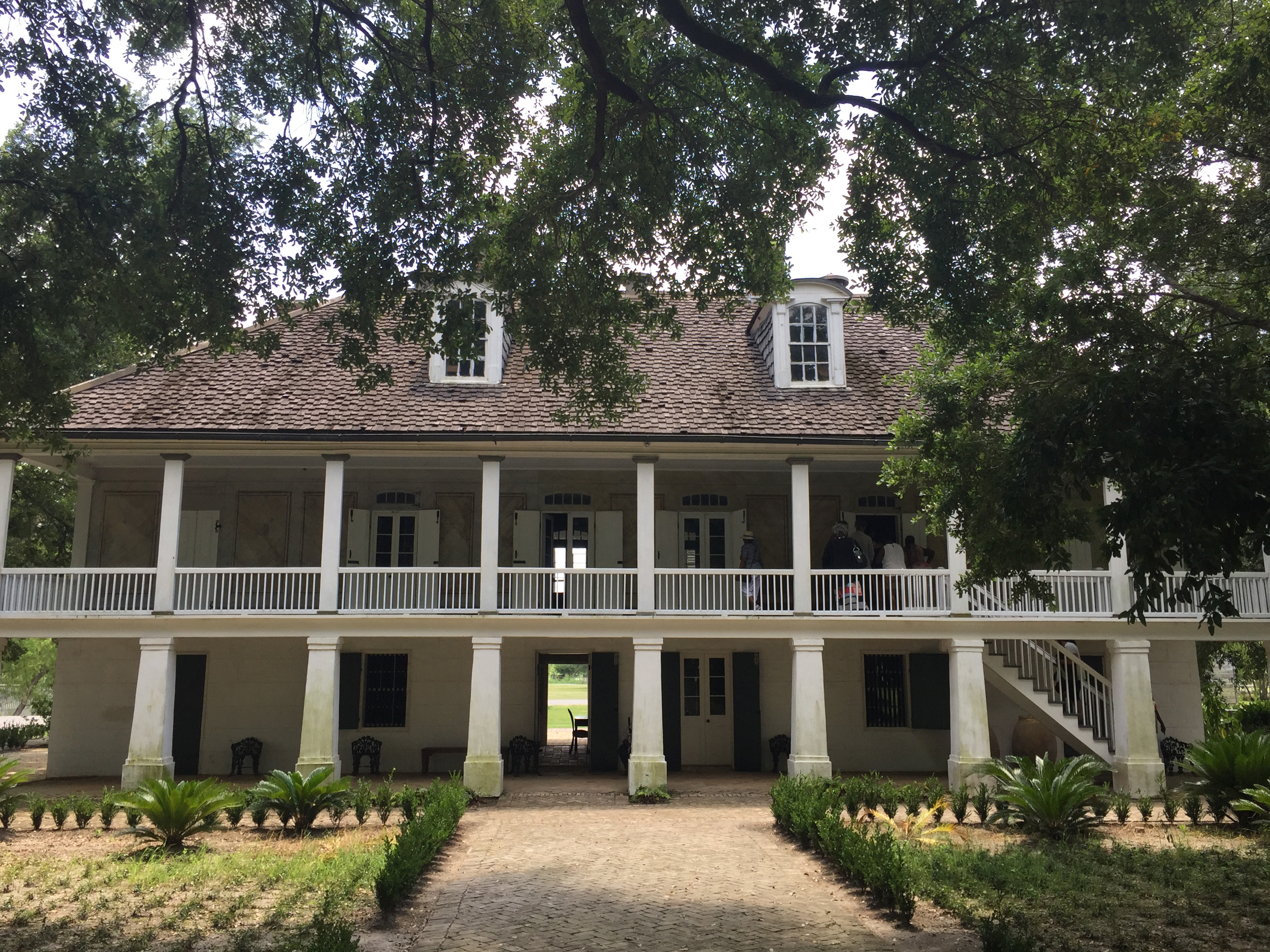
- Front of the Big House

- Location within Louisiana Location within the United States
- Interactive map showing the location of Whitney Plantation Historic District
- Nearest city: Wallace, Louisiana
- Coordinates: 30°2′21″N 90°39′2″W
- Area: 40 acres (16 ha)
- Built: 1790; 236 years ago
- Architectural style: Federal, French Creole
- Website: whitneyplantation.org
- MPS: Louisiana's French Creole Architecture MPS
- NRHP reference No.: 92001566
- Added to NRHP: November 24, 1992

The Whitney Plantation Historic District is preserved by the Whitney Institute, a non-profit whose mission is to educate the public about the history and legacies of slavery in the Southern United States. The district, including the main house and outbuildings, is preserved near Wallace, in St. John the Baptist Parish, Louisiana, on the River Road along the Mississippi River. What was originally known as Habitation Haydel was founded in 1752 by Ambroise Heidal, one of the many German immigrants who colonized the river parishes in the 18th century. His descendants owned it until 1860.

In 1866, after the American Civil War, it was sold to businessman Bradish Johnson. He renamed it Whitney Plantation in honor of his daughter, who had married into the Whitney family.

== Overview ==
The plantation was a 1,500-acre (610 ha) property. Today, 200 acres (81 ha) are occupied by the museum and historic district complex. It opened to the public for the first time in December 2014. The museum was founded by John Cummings, a trial attorney from New Orleans who spent more than $10 million of his own fortune on this long-term project. He worked on it for 20 years. The grounds contain several memorial sites dedicated to the more than 100,000 men, women, and children who were enslaved in Louisiana. Original art commissioned by Cummings, including life-size sculptures of children, was added to help tell the history of slavery. The sculptures are representative of people born into slavery before the Civil War. Mr. Cummings donated the entirety of the museum and land to a non-profit known as the Whitney Plantation Museum (landowner of the site) in 2019. The director of research is Dr. Ibrahima Seck, a Senegalese scholar specializing in the history of slavery.

Many survivors were interviewed as adults for the Federal Writers' Project during the Great Depression in the 1930s. These oral histories of hundreds of the last survivors of slavery in the United States were collected and published by the federal government to preserve their stories. The transcripts and some audio recordings are held by the Library of Congress. According to a writer for The Guardian, the Whitney plantation is known for "memorializing slavery and honoring enslaved people", in contrast to other plantations that are "used as sites for weddings or other lighthearted forms of tourism".

In February 2025, the United States National Park Service withdrew an application to recognize the plantation as a national landmark after the Louisiana Department of Environmental Quality requested that the application be denied. A federal grant was also denied as a result of the Trump administration's cuts to DEI-related programs. The $55,000 in funding was intended to be used for an exhibit about resistance to the practice of slavery.

== Historic structures ==
The French Creole raised-style main house, built in ca. 1790, is an important architectural example in the state. The plantation has numerous outbuildings or "dependencies": a pigeonnier or dovecote, a plantation store, the only surviving French Creole barn in North America (ca. 1790), a detached kitchen, an overseer's house, a mule barn, and two slave cabins. Other original buildings in the main complex include a shrimp trap shed, tractor shed, manager's house and shopkeeper's house.

The complex includes three archaeological sites. These sites have been subject to varying degrees of excavation and exploration.

The 1884 Mialaret House, along with its associated buildings and property, was added to the complex through a later purchase in 1920. The buildings help to represent the long working history of the plantation, which extended well into the 20th century, ceasing operations as a plantation in 1975. Some of the extensive land is still planted with sugarcane and is still owned by Whitney Plantation today.

The Whitney Plantation historic district was listed on the U.S. National Register of Historic Places in 1992. It is one of 26 sites featured on the Louisiana African American Heritage Trail.

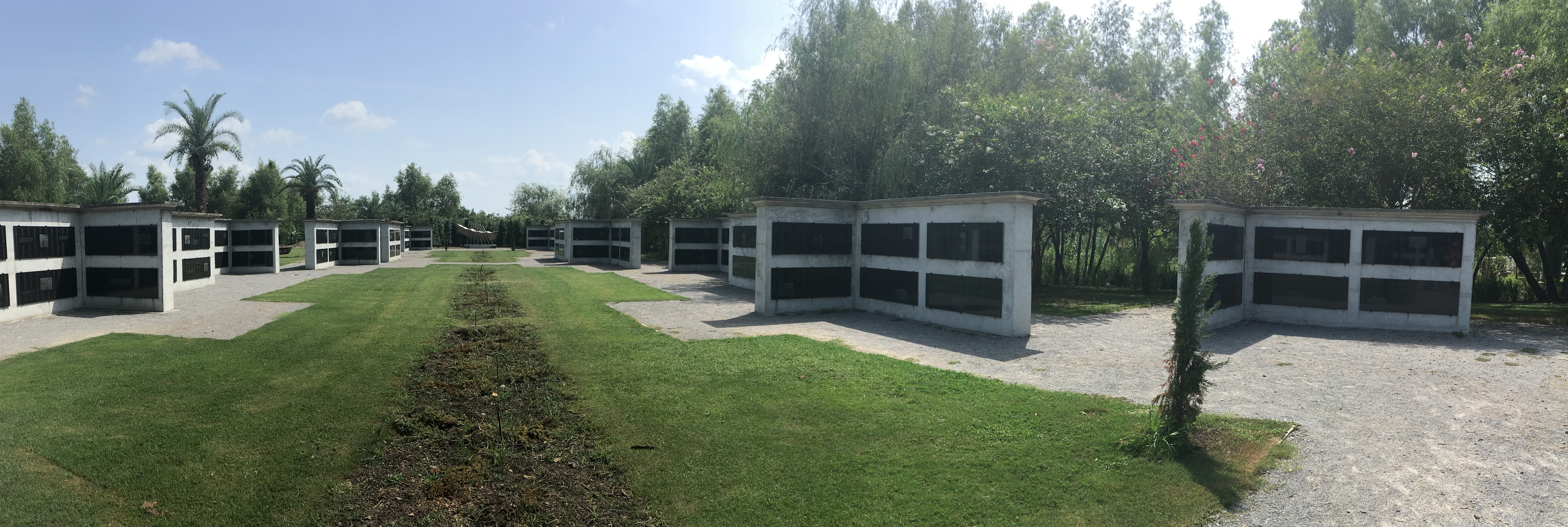
The Whitney Plantation’s Allées Gwendolyn Midlo Hall memorial reflects the most significant research project undertaken to document the genealogy of enslaved people in Louisiana.

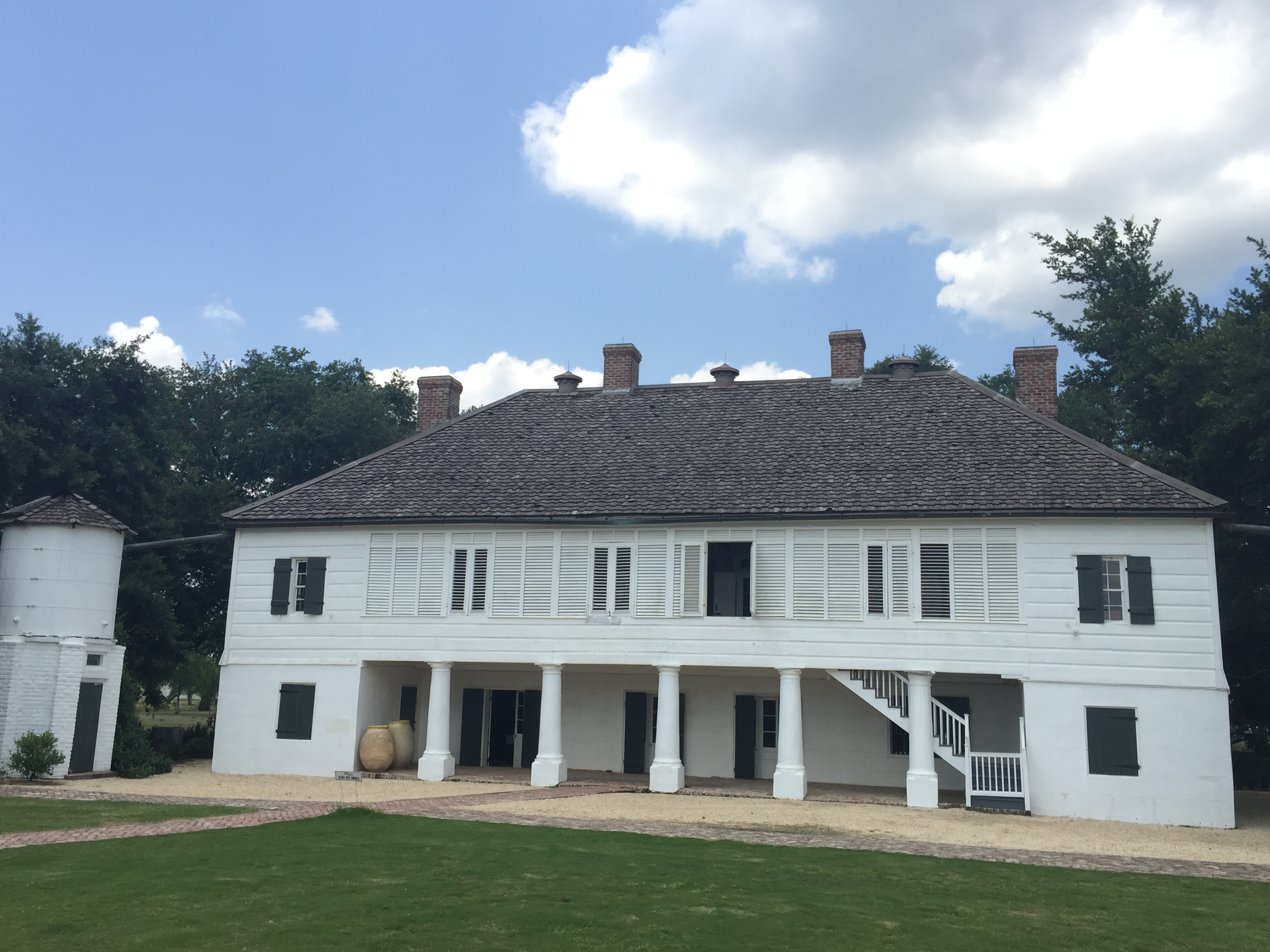
Rear of the Big House, home to the Haydel family between 1790 and 1867.

== Ownership of the Whitney ==
The Whitney Plantation's land was first bought in 1752 by Ambroise Heidel, an immigrant from Germany. At some point, his family changed the spelling of their surname to Haydel. Upon Ambroise's death, ownership of the land passed to his youngest son, Jean Jacques Haydel. In 1820, this son bequeathed the property to his own sons, who were named Jean Jacques Jr. and Marcellin. Jean Jacques Jr. and Marcellin later bought a plantation next to the property their father had given them. After Marcellin's death in 1839, his widow, Marie Azélie Haydel, ran the plantation during its most productive time. In this period, it was one of Louisiana's most profitable sugarcane businesses. Marie Haydel was one of Louisiana's largest slaveholders by the time she died in 1860.

Later, in 1866, after the American Civil War had ended, Bradish Johnson became the owner of the plantation. He renamed it as Whitney, in honor of his daughter, who had married a man with that surname.

John Cummings acquired the Whitney complex in 1999, holding it until 2019. He spent more than 15 years restoring it before opening it to the public in 2014. He donated the Whitney in 2019. It is now a 501(c)(3) organization governed by a board of directors.

== In popular culture ==
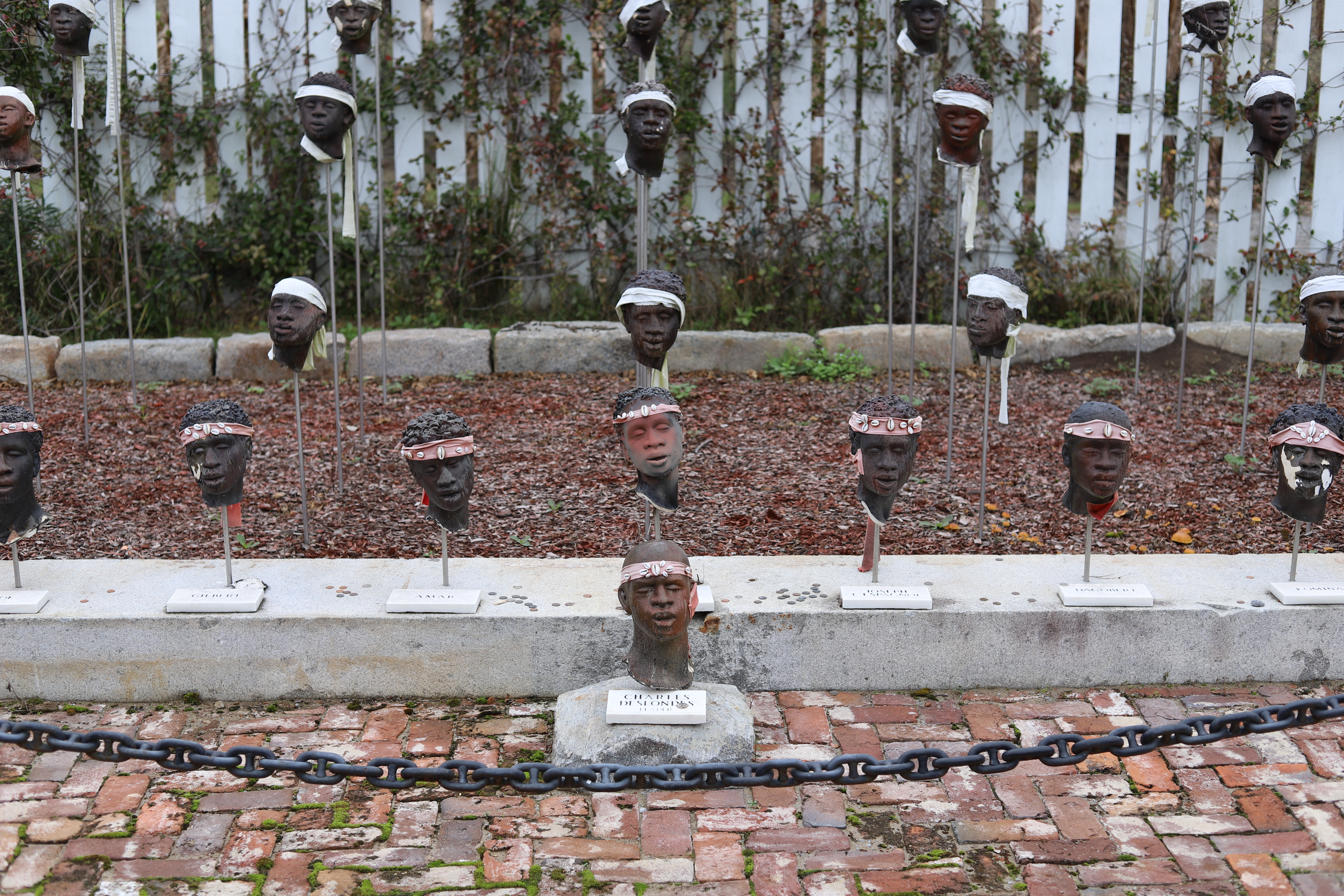
This memorial to the 1811 German Coast uprising depicts the heroes of the largest and most sophisticated slave revolt in U.S. history, located at Whitney Plantation

- Quentin Tarantino made a film Django Unchained (2012) about a slave uprising. A scene was filmed in the rebuilt blacksmith's shop at Whitney Plantation.
- The Atlantic magazine made a short documentary video about the museum in 2015, Why America Needs a Slavery Museum.

== See also ==
- Evergreen Plantation, also in the vicinity of Wallace
- History of slavery in Louisiana
- Louisiana African American Heritage Trail
- List of plantations in Louisiana
- National Register of Historic Places listings in St. John the Baptist Parish, Louisiana
- Plantation complexes in the Southern United States
- Rural African American Museum, Opelousas
