= Uncle Sam Plantation =

Human settlement in Louisiana, United States of America

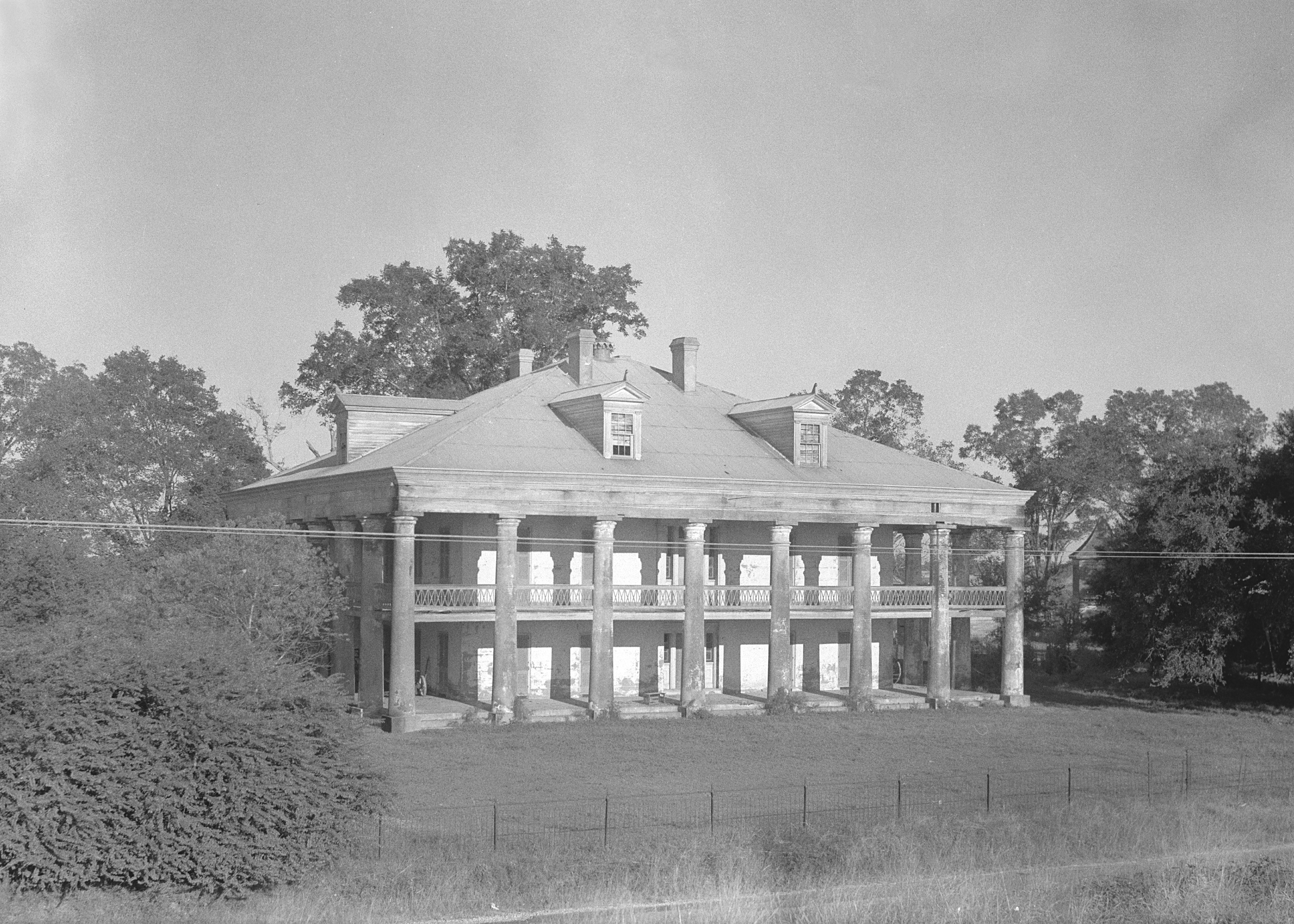
- The main house in 1936
- Location: Convent, Louisiana vicinity
- Coordinates: 30.03709°N 90.83247°W
- Built: 1829–1843
- Demolished: 1940
- Architectural style: Greek Revival
- Governing body: Private

Uncle Sam Plantation, originally known as Constancia, was a historic sugar plantation and elaborate Greek Revival-style mansion on the Mississippi River, near Convent in St. James Parish, Louisiana. It was established during the 1810s, with the main house and numerous outbuildings built by Samuel Pierre Auguste Fagot between 1829 and 1843. Once renowned as one of the most intact and architecturally-unified plantation complexes in the Southeastern United States, all of the structures were demolished to make way for construction of a new river levee in 1940. It was recorded by the Historic American Buildings Survey prior to its destruction.

== History ==
The plantation was established by Colonel Joseph Constance when he acquired several tracts of land at the location following the War of 1812. Pierre Auguste Samuel Fagot, usually known as Samuel Fagot, acquired the plantation and other St. James Parish properties beginning in 1829. A native of La Rochelle, France, he emigrated to the United States and was living in the vicinity of Convent by 1828. He married Emilie Jourdain and had two daughters, Marie Emilie Eugenie and Felicie. Marie Emilie Eugenie married Jacques Auguste Demophon Tureaud and Felicie married Lucien Malus.

By the time of Samuel Fagot's death in 1858, he was one of the largest landowners in St. James Parish. The plantation went to his widow after his death, but his son-in-law, Lucien Malus, operated the plantation. Following the Civil War, the plantation, which had been called Constancia up until that time, came to be called Uncle Sam instead. Many different stories have attempted to explain the name. One is that it came from the sugar containers from the plantation being marked for export with "U.S." for the nation of origin. Others claim that it referred to Samuel Fagot himself. None has been confirmed by historians.

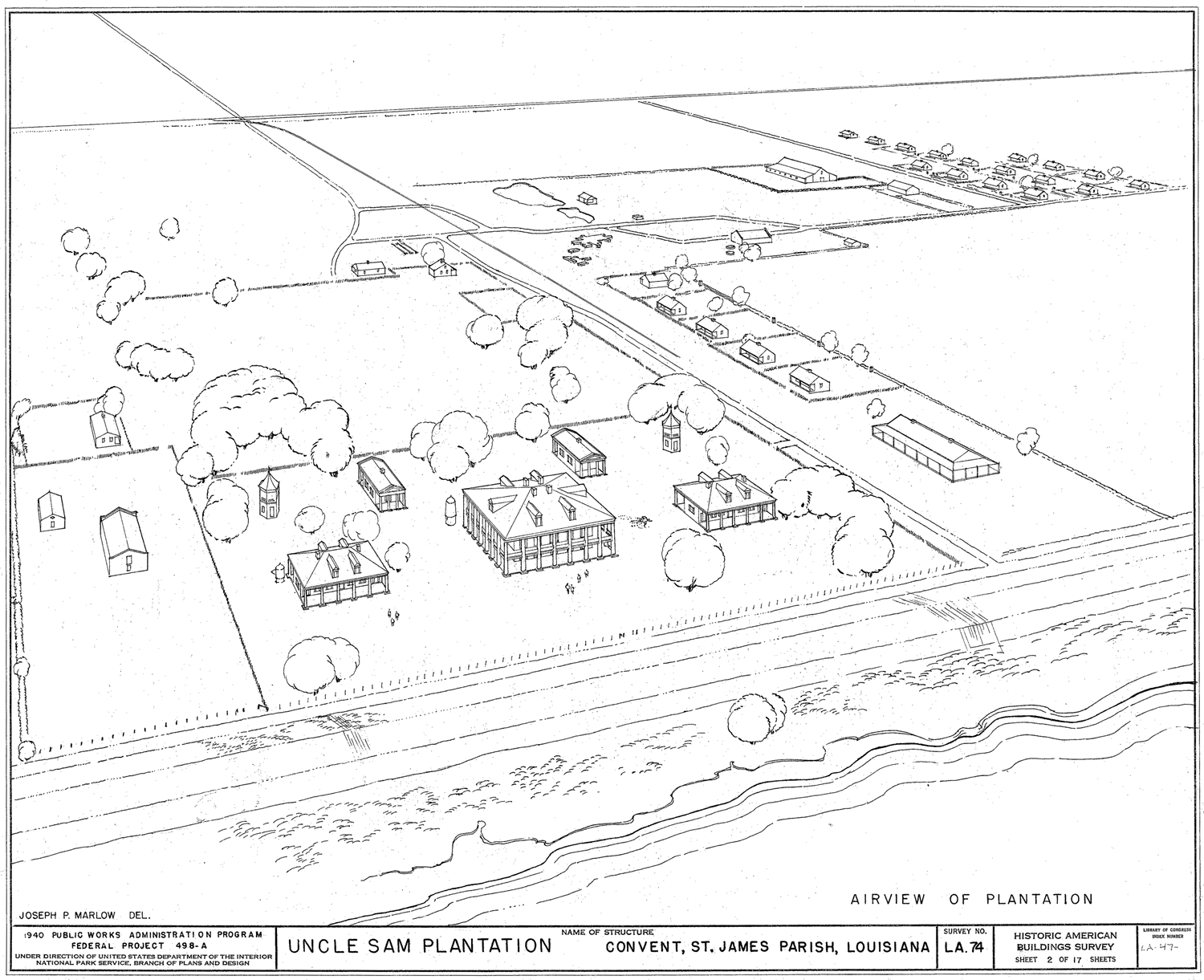
Aerial perspective drawing of Uncle Sam Plantation (1940)

Felicie and Lucien Malus had two daughters, Emelie and Felicie. They married two brothers, Jules and Camile Jacob. Following the death of Lucien Malus, the Jacob brothers operated the plantation. Jules later bought Camile's share and was the sole owner of the plantation until selling in 1915 to a New Orleans businessman. The plantation's main house would never be lived in again after this transaction, although the estate continued to be operated as an agricultural enterprise.

In early 1940 the Pontchartrain Levee District commissioners determined that the only way to fix structural problems in the river levee would be to build a new one over the site. Demolition quickly followed. On March 12, 1940, as demolition was nearing completion, the United States Army Corps of Engineers office in New Orleans received a telegram from the director of the National Park Service asking that demolition be delayed until an investigation could be completed to determine if the site might be given National Monument or National Historic Site status. However, it was too late to save the plantation complex.

Following the demolition, 300,000 bricks from Uncle Sam were used in the restoration of another extensive plantation complex nearby, Evergreen Plantation in Wallace. A chemical plant, now owned by the Mosaic Company, was later built on the site. A historic marker was erected in 1969, the only reminder of what once was there.

== Architecture ==
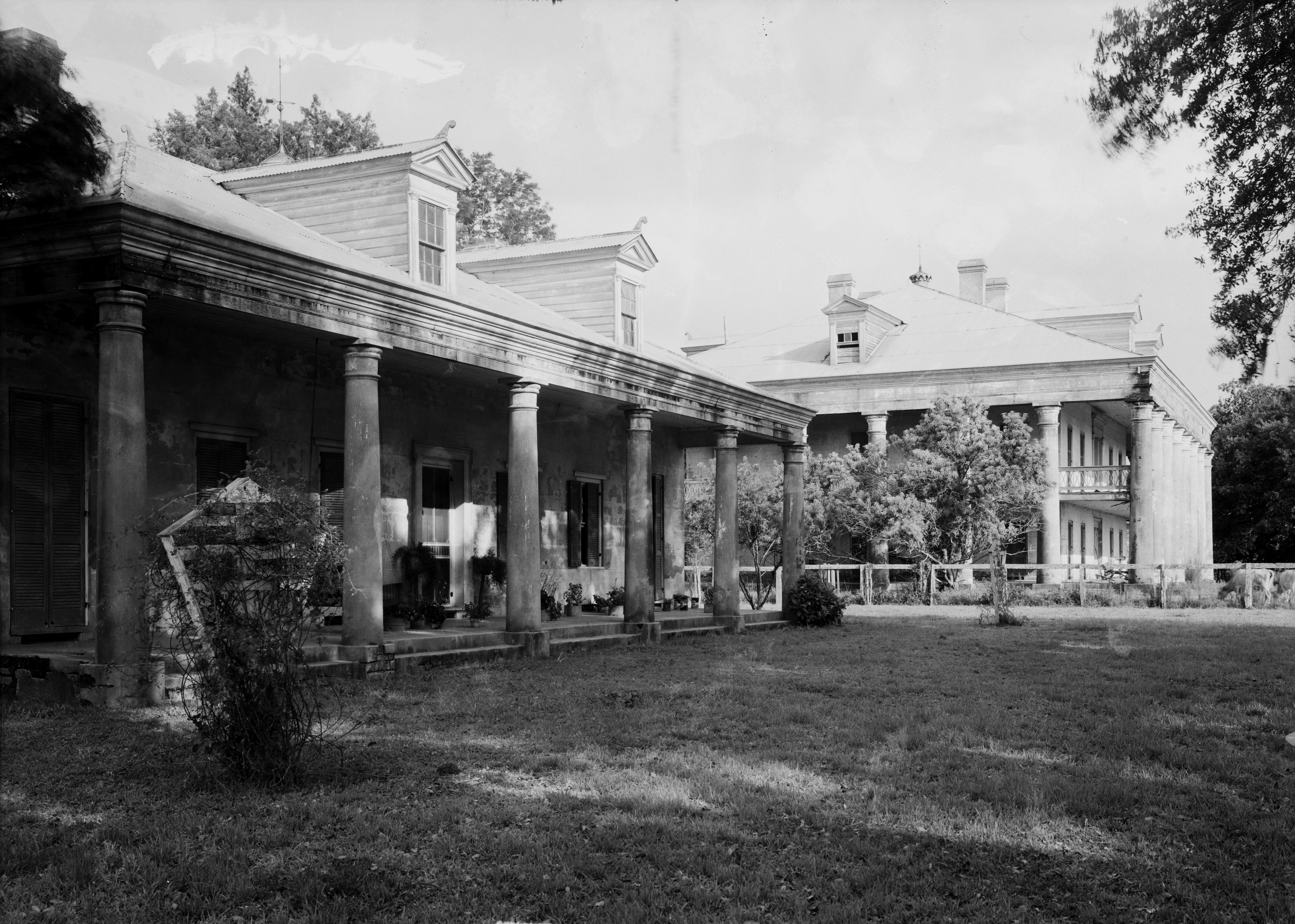
Front (west) facade of one of the two matching garconnières and the main house (1938)

The first brick buildings that Samuel Fagot built, and that would remain a part of the final design of the complex, were matching temple-like structures that housed the plantation office and the kitchen. The one-story, stuccoed brick buildings were each fronted by a tetrastyle portico with Tuscan columns. They flanked the north and south sides of the main house toward the rear (east) and measured 6.8 m (22 ft 4 in) wide by 16.83 m (55 ft 3 in) deep.

The foundations for the main house were started in the mid-to-late 1830s, with construction being completed in 1841 or 1843. A previous, smaller main house had been destroyed by fire. The new main house was 2 1/2 stories tall and measured 28 m (92 ft) wide by 25.2 m (82 ft 8 in) deep. It was topped with a pyramidal metal roof with dormers. The front facade faced west, toward the river. The brick exterior was stuccoed and scored to simulate ashlar masonry. It was surrounded by a peripteral (on all four sides) portico utilizing 28 monumentally-scaled Tuscan columns. A continuous balcony with a simple Roman-style balustrade wrapped around the exterior of the second floor.

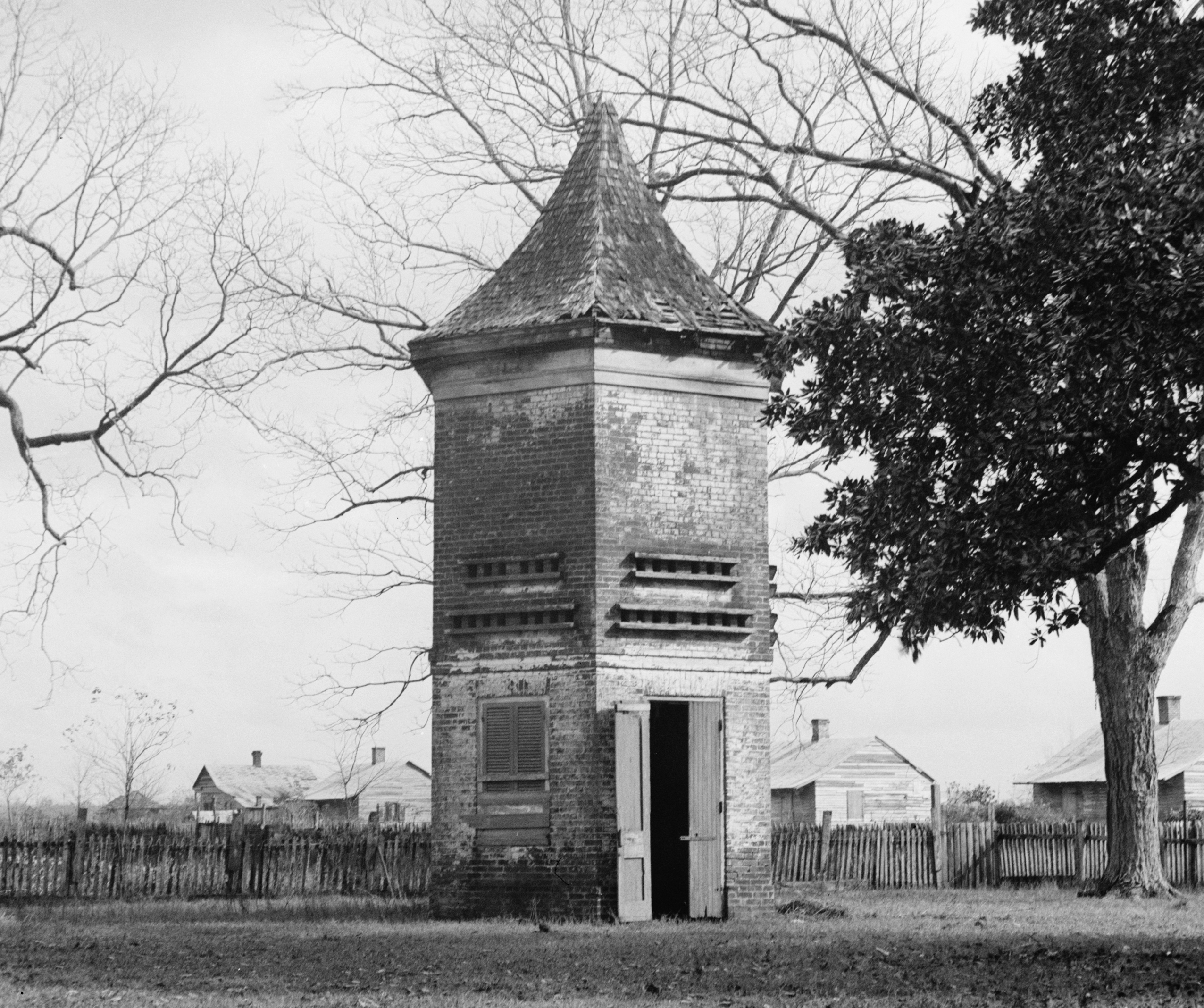
One of the two matching pigeonnier towers to the rear of the main house, with former slave cabins in the background (1937).

The interior was divided by a central hallway that ran from front to rear on both levels and measured 4.77 m (15 ft 8 in) wide by 17.21 m (56 ft 6 in) deep. On each side of the hallway, on both main levels, were several small rooms and two large rooms. The large rooms all measured 6.09 m (20.0 ft) by 6.7 m (22 ft). Additionally, a large main stairway was set into a side hall at the rear of the main hall.

Flanking the north and south sides of the main house toward the front (west) were a pair of matching garconnières (bachelors' quarters). Garconnières, unique to Louisiana Creole plantations, were built for the unmarried young men and guests of the plantation. It was custom that once a boy reached adolescence, he was housed separately from the unmarried girls and women. Also built of scored stucco over brick, they were 1 1/2 stories tall and measured 20.03 m (65 ft 9 in) wide by 12.95 m (42 ft 6 in) deep. These matched the main house, with a hexastyle portico set under the roof on the front and rear facades. Each garconnière was topped by a pyramidal roof with dormers facing the front and rear. Both of them featured a central hall and four adjoining rooms on the primary floor.

Among the most unusual features of the plantation were two matching pigeonnier (dovecote) towers set to the north and south of the main house in the rear yard. These hexagonal structures were also built of brick and stood 12.1 m (40 ft) high. They were used for raising pigeons for eggs and squab.
