= Louisiana African American Heritage Trail =

Cultural heritage trail with 38 sites in Louisiana

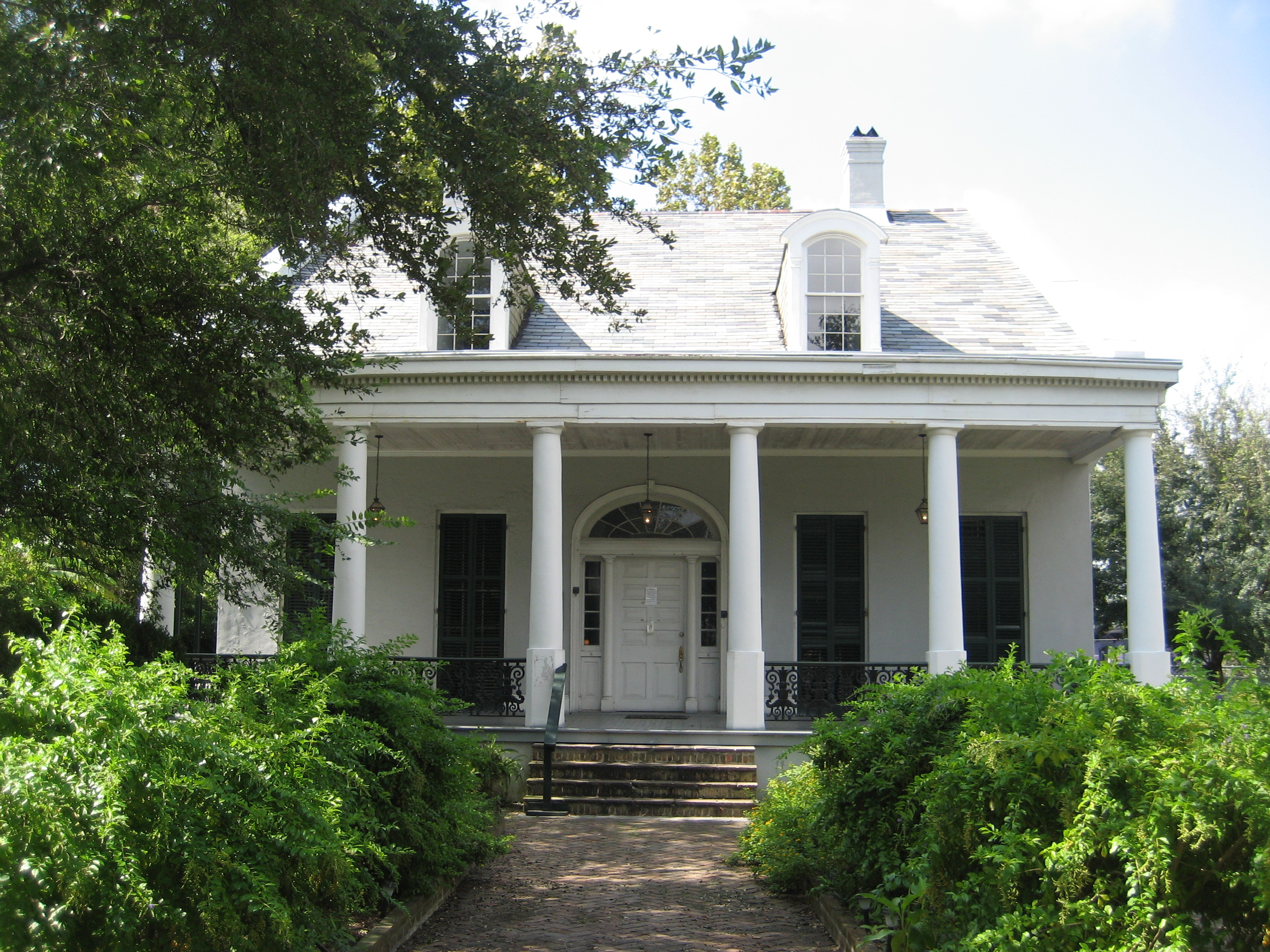
New Orleans African American Museum

Louisiana African American Heritage Trail (French: Sentier de l'héritage afro-américain de la Louisiane) is a cultural heritage trail with 38 sites designated by the state of Louisiana, from New Orleans along the Mississippi River to Baton Rouge and Shreveport, with sites in small towns and plantations also included. In New Orleans several sites are within a walking area. Auto travel is required to reach sites outside the city.

A variety of African-American museums devoted to art, history and culture are on the "trail", as is the Cane River Creole National Historical Park, and the first two churches founded by and for free people of color. The trail includes two extensive plantation complexes, with surviving slave quarters used by people who lived and worked at the plantations — until 1930 in one case, and into the 1960s at the other. Two historically black universities are also on the trail.

Mitch Landrieu, as Lieutenant Governor, supported the establishment of the cultural heritage trail in order to highlight the many contributions of African Americans to the culture of Louisiana and the United States; and to promote these sites as destinations for tourism, which is increasingly important to the state's economy. The state established the trail with 26 sites in 2008, more were added in 2012 and 2019, and the list was expanded to 38 with an announcement from Lieutenant Governor Billy Nungesser in 2022.

== Historic sites ==
Included in 2008 were:

- New Orleans
  - Congo Square;
  - New Orleans African American Museum;
  - St. Augustine Church (New Orleans) in Tremé;
  - St. Louis Cemeteries No. 1 and No. 2;
  - French Market;
  - Amistad Research Center, Tulane University
- Mahalia Jackson's grave, Providence Park Cemetery, Metairie;
- Arna Bontemps African American Museum (birthplace of writer of the Harlem Renaissance), Alexandria;
- Madam C.J. Walker's birthplace, Delta;
- Hermione Museum, Tallulah, Louisiana, one of four antebellum houses in the parish, has exhibit about Madam C. J. Walker;
- Melrose Plantation, center of Louisiana Créole culture;
- Laura Plantation, Vacherie;
- Evergreen Plantation, Wallace;
- River Road African American Museum, Donaldsonville;
- Grambling State University, Grambling;
- Tangipahoa African American Heritage Museum, Hammond;
- Port Hudson State Historic Site, Jackson;
- Whitney Plantation Historic District, Wallace;
- African American Museum, St. Martinville;
- St. Augustine Catholic Church and Cemetery, Natchez, Louisiana;
- Black Heritage Art Gallery, Central School Arts and Humanities Center, Lake Charles;
- Creole Heritage Folk Life Center, Opelousas;
- Cane River Creole National Historical Park-Creole Center, Natchitoches;
- Southern University, Baton Rouge;
- Southern University Archives Department, Baton Rouge;
- Multicultural Center of the South, Shreveport;
- Isle Brevelle, Natchitoches;
- Southern University Museum of Art, Shreveport;
- Northeast Louisiana Delta African American Heritage Museum, Monroe

== See also ==
- National Museum of African American History and Culture, opened in 2016
- Rural African American Museum, Opelousas
- African-Americans in Louisiana
