= West St. John High School =

Location
- Edgard, Louisiana 70049; United States; 30°01′00″N 90°33′11″W

Information
- Type: Public school
- School district: SJBP
- Principal: Jeremy Brown
- Teaching staff: 41.47 (on an FTE basis)
- Grades: 8 to 12
- Enrollment: 193 (2023–2024)
- Student to teacher ratio: 4.65
- Colors: Royal Blue & White
- Mascot: Ram
- Team name: West St. John Rams
- Rival: St. James Wildcats
- Website: wsjh.stjohn.k12.la.us

West St. John High School is a predominantly black senior high school in Edgard, an unincorporated area in St. John the Baptist Parish, Louisiana. It is a part of the St. John the Baptist Parish School Board and serves grades 8–12.

The school has more than 200 students.

== History ==
West St. John was originally named Second Ward High School before changing to its current name.

There was a previous Second Ward High School also located in Edgard that served black students from 1950 to 1969.

== Extracurricular activities ==
- 4-H
- Beta
- Junior Beta Club
- Cheerleading
- Flag Team
- Ramettes
- Marching Band
- Student Council
- Team Management/Trainer

== Athletics ==
West St. John High athletics competes in the LHSAA.

- Softball
- Track
- Football
- Baseball
- Basketball - Girls
- Basketball - Boys
- Volleyball

State Championships
West St. John
(4) Football: 1998, 2003, 2004, 2017

Second Ward
(2) Football: 1971, 1972

== Notable alumni ==
- Tyson Jackson, NFL defensive lineman
- Quinn Johnson, NFL fullback
- Juan Joseph, CFL quarterback
- Terry Robiskie, NFL player and coach (Second Ward High School)
