= Ernest "Doc" Paulin =

Creole-French, New Orleans jazz musician

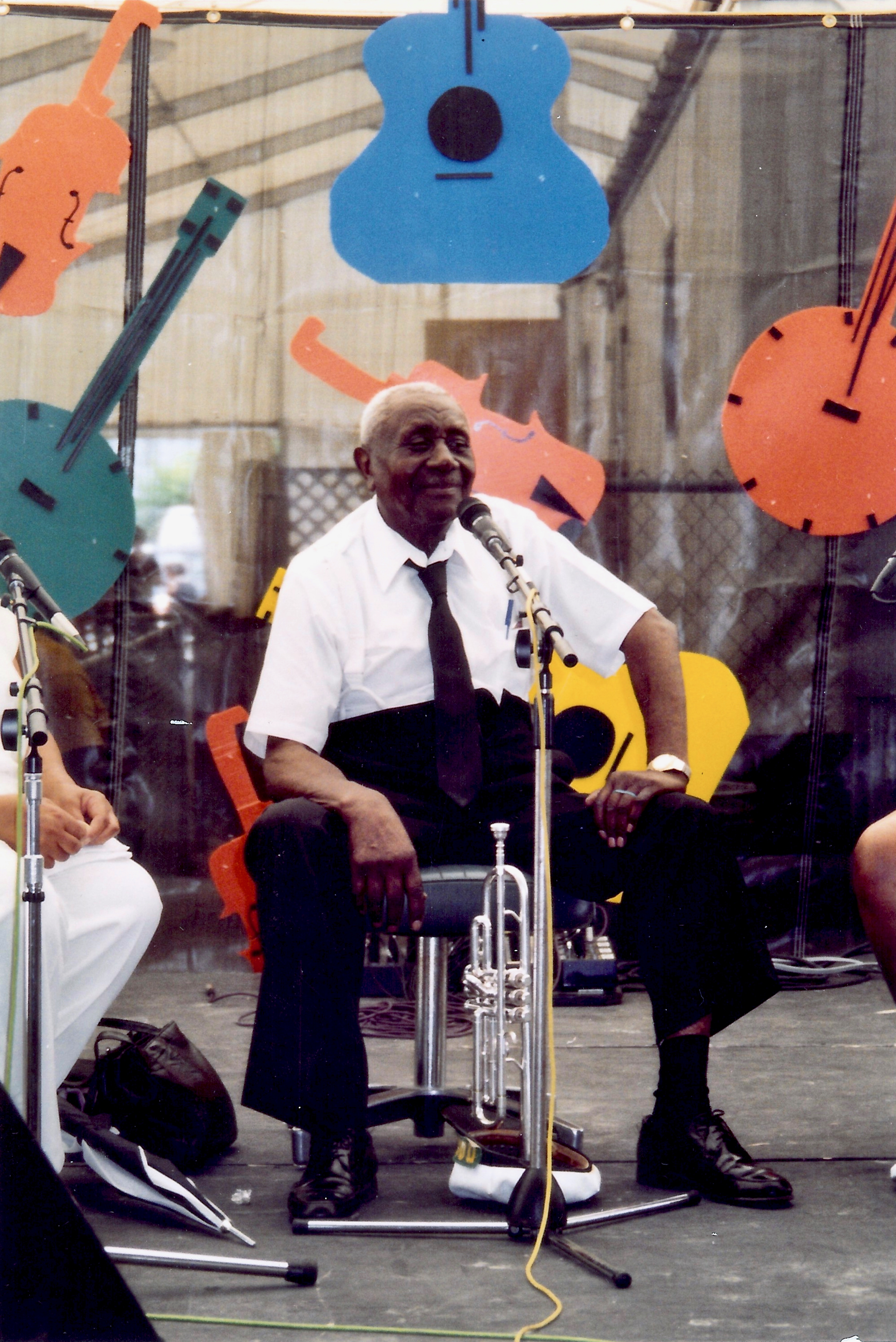

Background information
- Born: June 22, 1907; Wallace, Louisiana United States
- Died: November 20, 2007 (aged 100) Marrero, Louisiana United States
- Genres: Jazz
- Occupations: Musician, bandleader
- Instrument: Trumpet
- Years active: 1910 - 1990s
- Labels: Icon Records, Folkways
- Formerly of: Paulin Brothers Band

Ernest "Doc" Paulin (June 22, 1907 – November 20, 2007) was a New Orleans jazz brass band leader and trumpeter.

== Biography ==
Paulin was born in Wallace, Louisiana, in St. John the Baptist Parish to a Creole French speaking family. Paulin's father played the accordion. Edgar Peters, his uncle, was a trombonist. Paulin relocated to nearby New Orleans in his youth. He was active on the city's music scene since the 1920s and continued performing marching in long parades into the 1990s. His non-Union band gave many young musicians their start in playing professionally.

Paulin had 13 children, six of whom played music professionally, starting in their father's band. His sons continue to have one of the city's better known brass bands, the Paulin Brothers Band. Son Rickey Paulin, a clarinet player, was displaced to Houston by Hurricane Katrina in 2005.

Paulin's band was featured in Always for Pleasure, an award-winning documentary about New Orleans culture. Paulin recorded in the early 1960s with Emile Barnes on Icon Records, and in 1980 his brass band made an LP released on Folkways. He also performs on the CD by his sons' 1996 Paulin Brothers Jazz Band The Tradition Continues.

Paulin died at one of his daughter's homes in suburban Marrero, Louisiana in Jefferson Parish.

== Personal life ==
Paulin was Catholic.
