= Evergreen Plantation (Wallace, Louisiana) =

- U.S. National Register of Historic Places
- U.S. National Historic Landmark
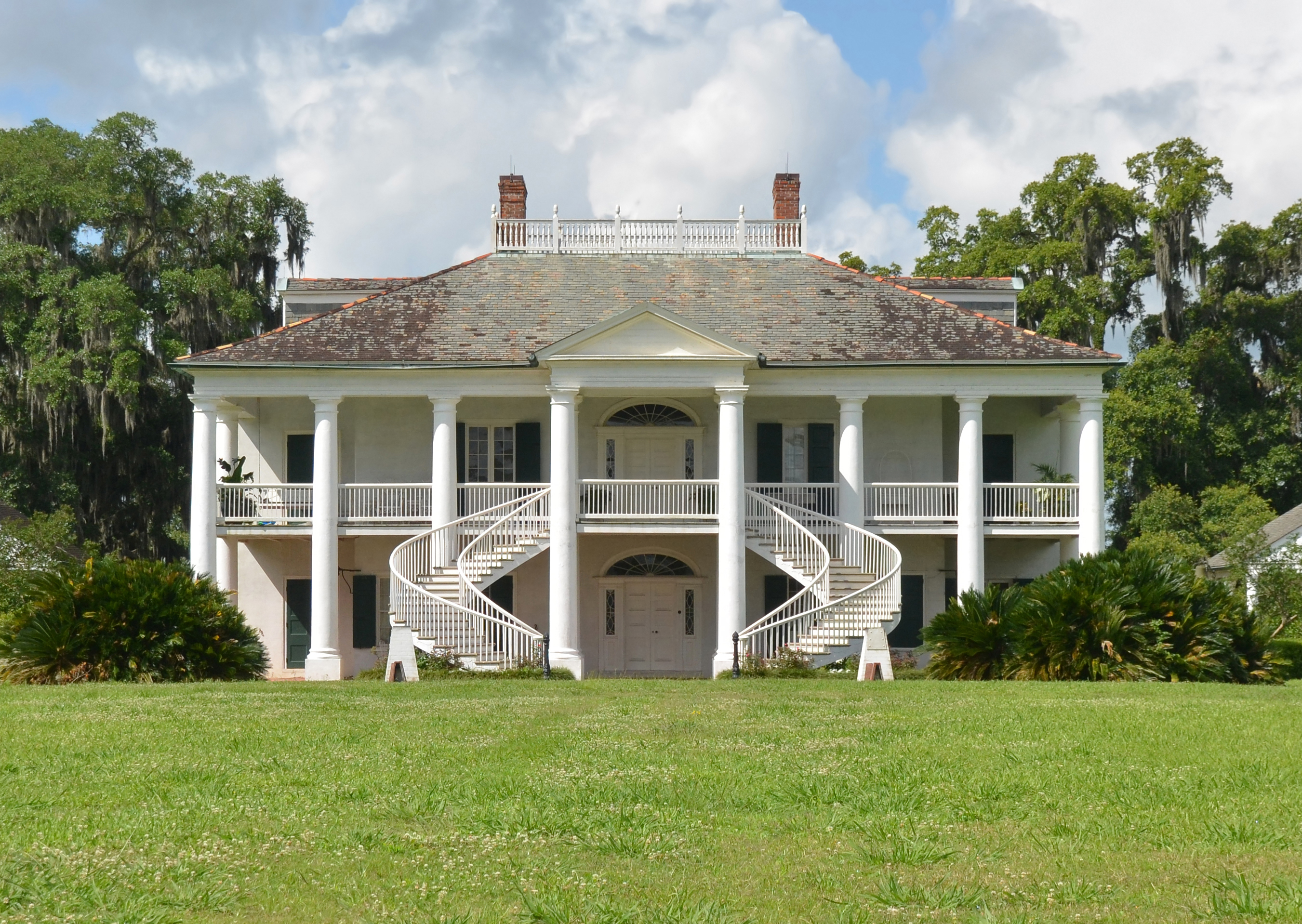

- Location within Louisiana Location within the United States
- Interactive map showing the location of Evergreen Plantation
- Nearest city: LA 18, Wallace, Louisiana
- Coordinates: 30°01′38″N 90°38′26″W
- Built: 1790, 1832
- Architect: John Carver
- Architectural style: Greek Revival, Federal
- NRHP reference No.: 91001386

Significant dates
- Added to NRHP: September 25, 1991
- Designated NHL: April 27, 1992

Evergreen Plantation is a plantation located on the west side of the Mississippi River in St. John the Baptist Parish, near Wallace, Louisiana, and along Louisiana Highway 18. The main house was constructed mostly in 1790, and renovated to its current Greek Revival style in 1832. The plantation's historical commodity crop was sugarcane, cultivated by enslaved African Americans until emancipation.

The plantation operated until about 1930, when the Depression resulted in the owners abandoning the house. The plantation continued to produce sugar cane under the direction of the bank that owned it, and it is still a working sugar cane plantation today. The house was extensively restored during the 1940s, with 300,000 bricks from the demolished Uncle Sam Plantation used in the restoration.

== Description ==
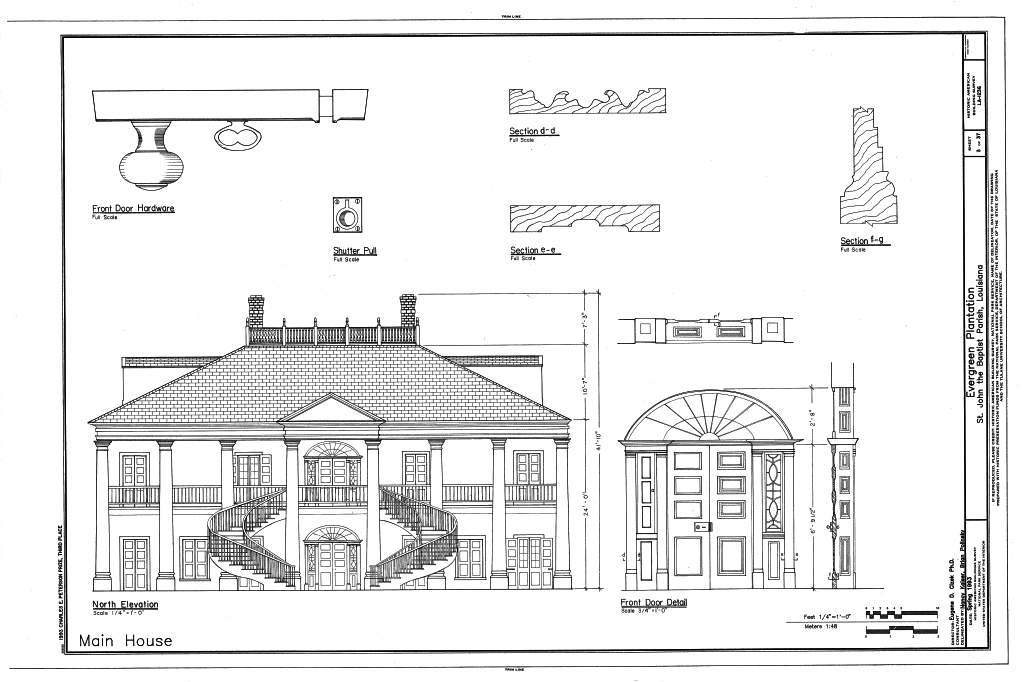
Drawing by the Historic American Buildings Survey

The plantation includes 37 contributing buildings, all but eight of them built before the Civil War, making it one of the most complete plantation complexes in the state and the South. Of great significance are the 22 slave quarters, arranged in a double row along an allée of oak trees.

Among the outbuildings are a garconnière, where young bachelors of the family or male guests could stay; a pigeonnier for keeping pigeons (a sign of status among the planters); an overseer's cottage; and late 19th-century barns.

== National Historic Landmark ==
Because of its quality and significance, the plantation was included among the first 26 featured sites on the Louisiana African American Heritage Trail. It was designated as a National Historic Landmark in 1992 for its rich architectural legacy. The house is not currently open for tours. A “No Trespassing” sign is posted at the beginning of the dirt road that leads to the house.

Heiress and businesswoman, Matilda Geddings Gray (1885–1971) sponsored the restoration project in the 1940s, and it is now a U.S. National Historic Landmark.

== In popular culture ==
It is a production site of films such as Django Unchained (2012) and Antebellum (2020).

== See also ==
- Whitney Plantation Historic District, also located in Wallace
- Louisiana African American Heritage Trail
- National Register of Historic Places listings in St. John the Baptist Parish, Louisiana
- List of National Historic Landmarks in Louisiana
- Plantation complexes in the Southern United States
