= Emilie Plantation =

Historic house in Louisiana, United States

- Emilie Plantation House
- U.S. National Register of Historic Places
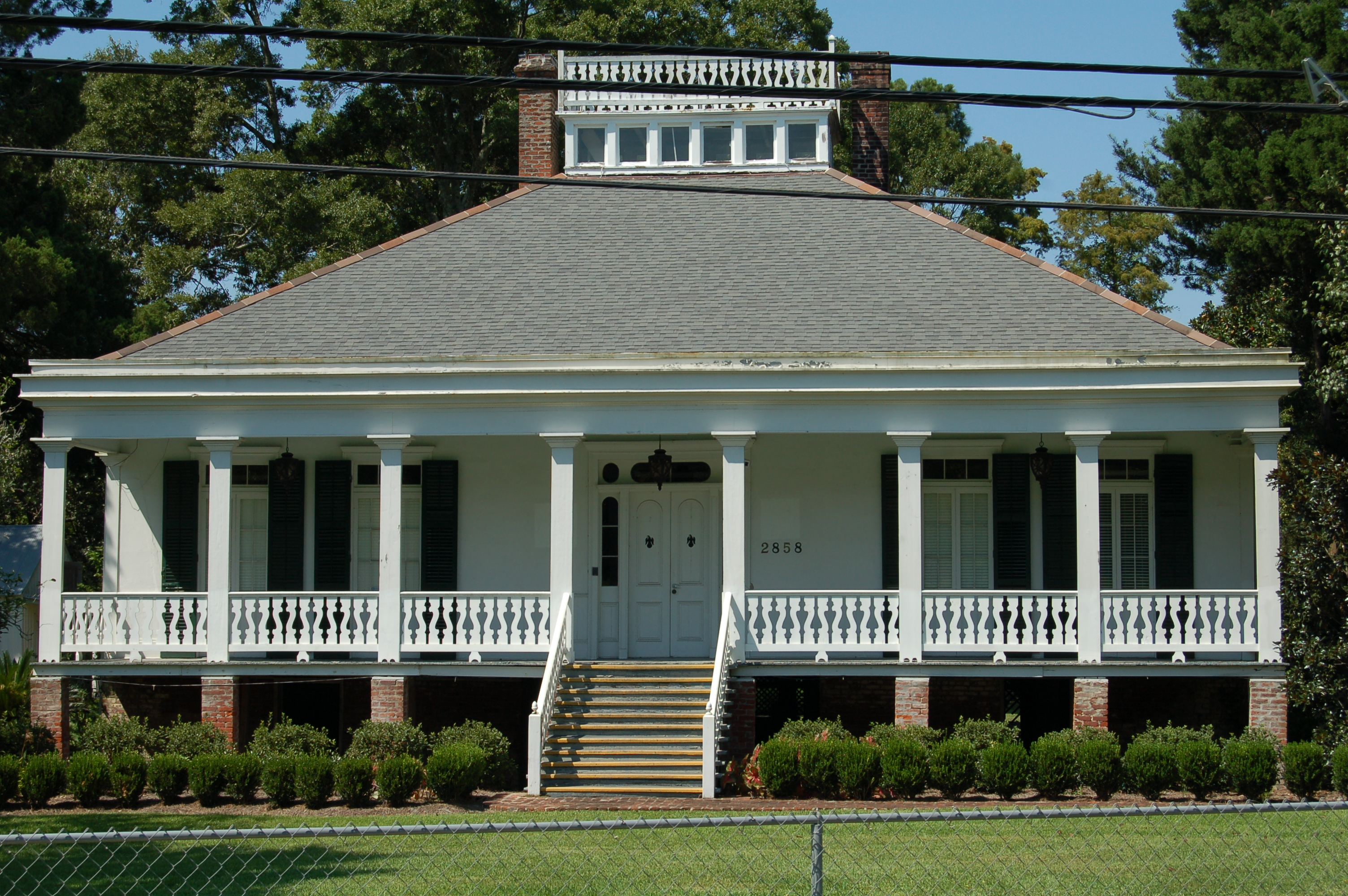
- The Emilie Plantation House in 2014

- Location within Louisiana Location within the United States
- Location: LA 44, Garyville, Louisiana, U.S.
- Coordinates: 30°2′45″N 90°36′34″W
- Area: 1.5 acres (0.61 ha)
- Built: 1882
- Built by: Adelard Millet
- Architectural style: Greek Revival, Italianate
- NRHP reference No.: 88003135
- Added to NRHP: January 13, 1989

The Emilie Plantation is a Southern plantation with a historic house located in Garyville, Louisiana, USA. It has been listed on the National Register of Historic Places since January 13, 1989.

"Emilie" was constructed in 1882 by Adelard Millet for Leonce Chauff. It was named for Leonce's younger sister. The home was purchased in 1997 by the Baloney family, whose ancestors once worked as slaves on the plantation
