= Tyson Jackson =

American football player (born 1986)

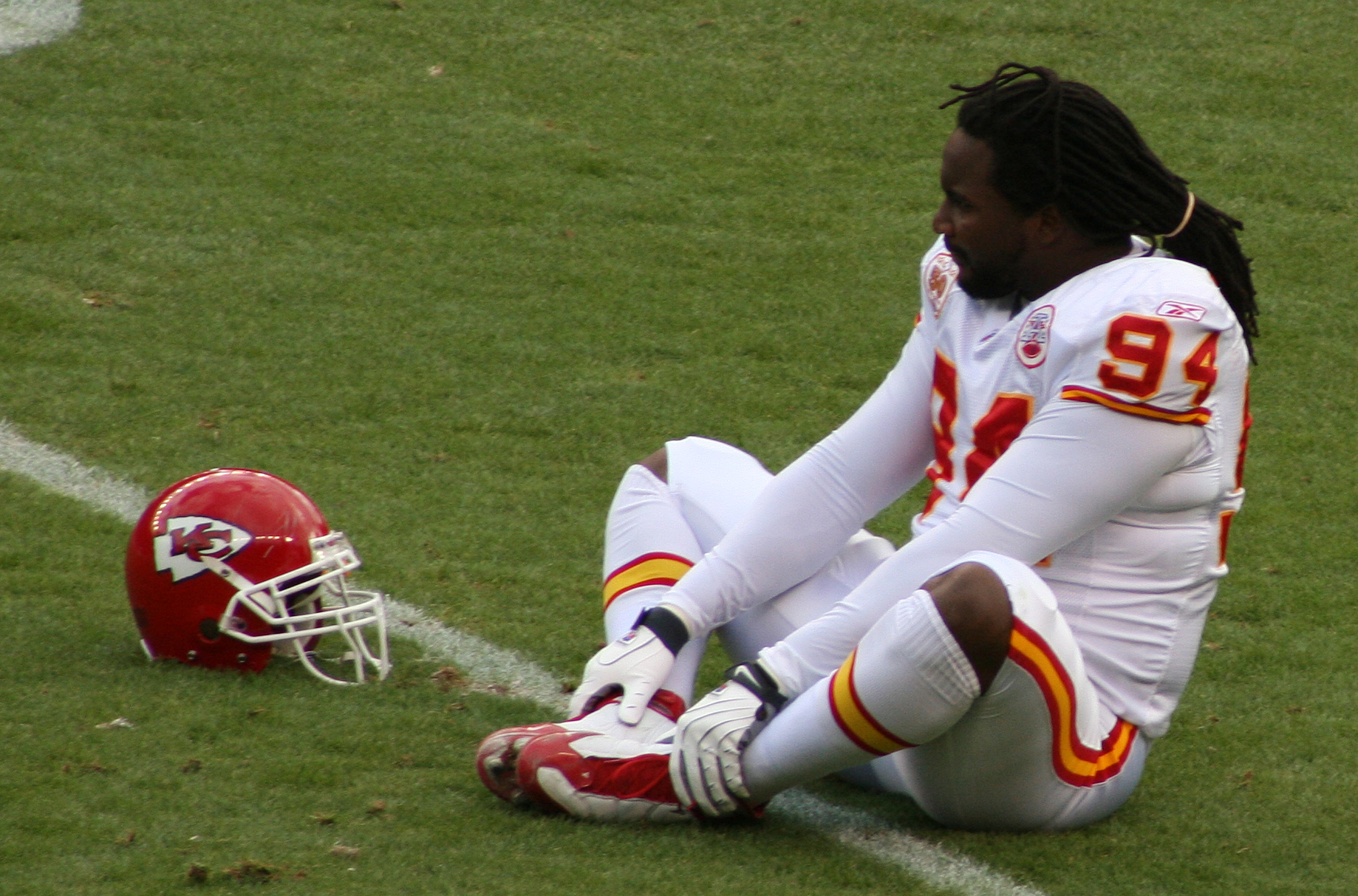
- Jackson with the Kansas City Chiefs in 2010

No. 94, 99
- Position: Defensive end

Personal information
- Born: June 6, 1986 (age 40); New Orleans, Louisiana, U.S.
- Listed height: 6 ft 4 in (1.93 m)
- Listed weight: 296 lb (134 kg)

Career information
- High school: West St. John (Edgard, Louisiana)
- College: LSU (2004–2008)
- NFL draft: 2009: 1st round, 3rd overall pick

Career history
- Kansas City Chiefs (2009–2013); Atlanta Falcons (2014–2016)

Awards and highlights
- PFWA All-Rookie Team (2009); BCS national champion (2007); 2× Second-team All-SEC (2006, 2008)

Career NFL statistics
- Total tackles: 266
- Sacks: 9
- Pass deflections: 15
- Stats at Pro Football Reference

Anthony Tyson Jackson (born June 6, 1986) is an American former professional football player who was a defensive end in the National Football League (NFL). He played college football for the LSU Tigers and was selected by the Kansas City Chiefs with the third overall pick in the 2009 NFL draft.

== Early life ==
Jackson attended West St. John High School in Edgard, Louisiana where he was a member of the Rams 2003 and 2004 2A State Championship teams. He was a two-way lineman who was named Class 2A Defensive Player of the Year after a senior season that totalled 84 tackles, 16 sacks, and 17 pressures, while winning the state championship. He was named All-District and All-Parish on the gridiron and also lettered in basketball. Considered a three-star recruit by Rivals.com, Jackson chose LSU over Oklahoma State and Colorado.

== College career ==
At Louisiana State University, Jackson redshirted for the Tigers in 2004.

As a redshirt freshman in 2005, he earned a spot on the Freshman All-SEC team by the league's coaches and the Sporting News. He recorded thirteen tackles (8 solos) and two sacks and added five quarterback pressures.

As a sophomore, in 2006, Jackson was a Second-team All-SEC selection. He was a starter at left defensive end and recorded 37 tackles (13 solos). He also had 8.5 sacks, six pressures and 10.5 tackles for a loss. Jackson caused and recovered a fumble, broke up four passes and caught an interception.

As a junior, in 2007, Jackson started thirteen of fourteen games at left defensive end. He totalled 36 tackles (15 solos) with 3.5 sacks, 4.5 stops for losses, and twelve quarterback pressures. Jackson caused a fumble and ranked second in the NCAA among defensive linemen with ten pass breakups.

As a senior, in 2008, Jackson earned All-SEC Second-team again. He recorded 36 tackles (17 solos) that included 4.5 sacks, 10.5 stops for losses, and seven quarterback pressures. He recovered a fumble and deflected four passes. In total, Jackson started 38 of 53 games at LSU, recording 122 tackles (53 solos) with 18 pass deflections, one interception, two forced fumbles, and a pair of fumble recoveries. He ranks eighth in school history with 18.5 sacks and is eleventh with 27 stops for losses.

== Professional career ==
=== Pre-draft ===
Despite having played in a 4–3 alignment at LSU, Jackson was considered an ideal 3–4 defensive end. He drew comparisons to Anthony Weaver.

Pre-draft measurables
Height	Weight	40-yard dash	10-yard split	20-yard split	20-yard shuttle	Three-cone drill	Vertical jump	Broad jump	Bench press	Wonderlic
6 ft 4 1/8 in (1.93 m)	296 lb (134 kg)	4.94 s	1.68 s	2.79 s	4.80 s	7.64 s	28 1/2 in (0.72 m)	8 ft 6 in (2.59 m)	20 reps	17
Bench from LSU Pro Day, all others from NFL Combine

=== Kansas City Chiefs ===
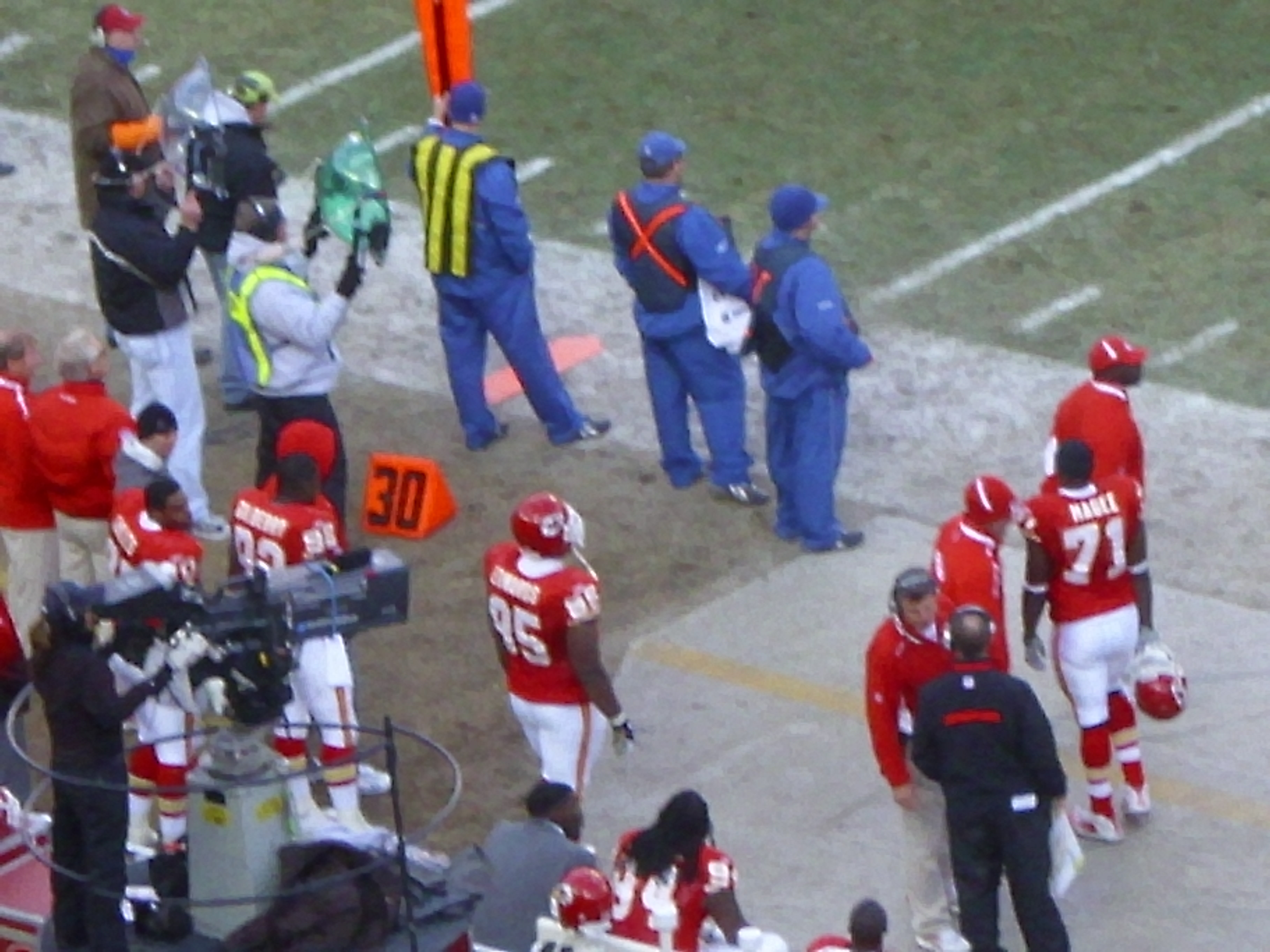
Jackson (seated, #94) on the sidelines with the Chiefs

Jackson was selected in the first round with the third overall selection by the Chiefs, who looked to implement him as defensive end into their new 3-4 defense. Jackson remained unsigned at the beginning of the Chiefs' training camp session and did not travel with the team to River Falls, Wisconsin (site of the team's practice facilities). The holdout ended on August 7 as he was signed to a five-year contract reportedly worth $57 million with $31 million guaranteed. Tyson played in all 16 games of his rookie season and had 38 tackles (27 solo) with two pass deflections. In 2010, he recorded 31 total tackles and one sack. In 2011, Jackson had only one sack though he also had a career record of 55 tackles.

=== Atlanta Falcons ===
On March 11, 2014, Jackson signed a five-year, $25 million deal with the Atlanta Falcons.

In the 2016 season, Jackson and the Falcons reached Super Bowl LI, where they faced the New England Patriots on February 5, 2017. In the Super Bowl, Jackson had one total tackle as the Falcons fell in a 34–28 overtime defeat.

On March 9, 2017, Jackson was released by the Falcons.

=== NFL statistics ===
Year	Team	GP	COMB	TOTAL	AST	SACK	FF	FR	FR YDS	INT	IR YDS	AVG IR	LNG	TD	PD
2009	KC	16	38	27	11	0.0	0	0	0	0	0	0	0	0	2
2010	KC	12	31	19	12	1.0	0	0	0	0	0	0	0	0	0
2011	KC	16	55	37	18	1.0	0	0	0	0	0	0	0	0	2
2012	KC	15	43	31	12	3.0	0	0	0	0	0	0	0	0	3
2013	KC	15	34	25	9	4.0	0	0	0	0	0	0	0	0	3
2014	ATL	16	22	9	13	0.0	0	0	0	0	0	0	0	0	3
2015	ATL	16	31	14	17	0.0	0	0	0	0	0	0	0	0	0
2016	ATL	16	13	5	8	0.0	0	0	0	0	0	0	0	0	1
Career		122	267	168	99	9.0	0	0	0	0	0	0	0	0	14
