= Multicultural Center of the South =

Coordinates: 32.51420°N 93.74621°W

The Multicultural Center of the South is an arts center located in downtown Shreveport, Louisiana. Together with Southern University Museum of Art, the Center is one of two sites in Shreveport designated among twenty-six featured destinations on the statewide Louisiana African American Heritage Trail.
