= Edgard, Louisiana =

Edgard
- CDP
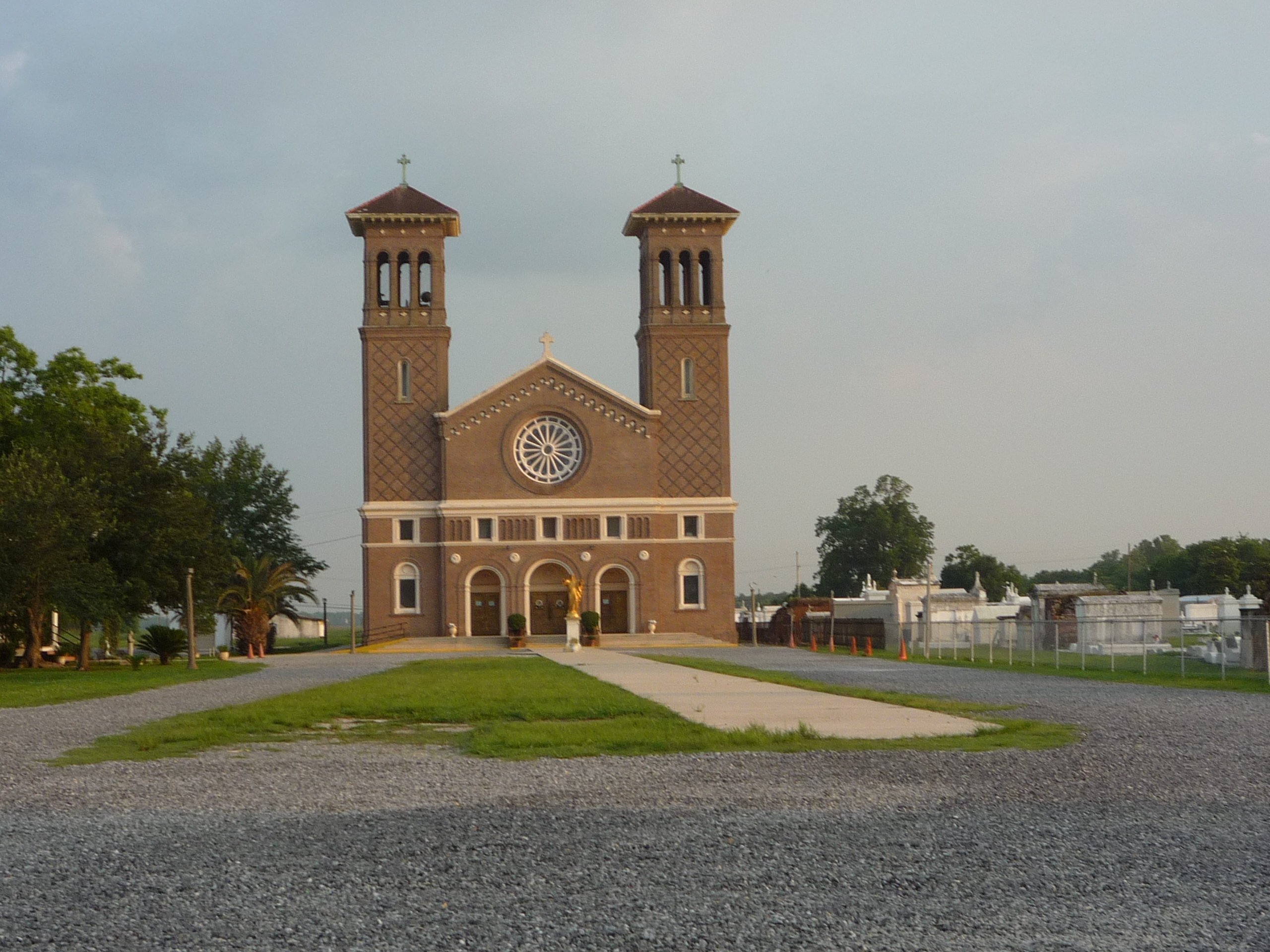
- St. John the Baptist Roman Catholic Church, Edgard

- Location of Edgard in Louisiana
- Coordinates: 30°02′02″N 90°33′14″W
- Country: United States
- State: Louisiana
- Parish: St. John the Baptist

Area
  - Total: 13.83 sq mi (35.81 km^{2})
  - Land: 11.39 sq mi (29.49 km^{2})
  - Water: 2.44 sq mi (6.32 km^{2})
- Elevation: 13 ft (4.0 m)

Population (2020)
  - Total: 1,948
  - Density: 171.1/sq mi (66.07/km^{2})
- Time zone: UTC-6 (CST)
  - Summer (DST): UTC-5 (CDT)
- ZIP code: 70049
- Area code: 985
- FIPS code: 22-22815

Edgard is a census-designated place (CDP) in, and the parish seat of, St. John the Baptist Parish, Louisiana, United States. The population was 2,637 at the 2000 census and 1,948 in 2020. It is part of the New Orleans–Metairie–Kenner metropolitan statistical area. Edgard is part of the German Coast of Louisiana.

== History ==
One of the parish's first communities and a social haunt of the privateer Jean Lafitte, Edgard has been the parish seat since 1848. Originally named St. John the Baptist for the Catholic church at its heart, Edgard was renamed in 1850 for its postmaster, Edgar Perret. Edgard's first St. John the Baptist Catholic Church (1772) was destroyed by the Poché Crévasse in 1821. Another church was soon erected. In 1918 fire gutted the building. Parishioners gave generously to replace the church and, by the time the new church opened its doors, all debts had been paid.

The economic history of Edgard included a sawmill operated by Severin Tassin, a brick factory begun in 1878, and numerous sugar plantations that operated in the century between 1794 and 1894. By 1899, more than fifty family-owned sugar houses (sugar mills) were still operating.

The majority of the town's folk worked in the sugar houses, in the fields, or in support of the sugar industry. Many families leased land from the Caires and Graugnards on Columbia Plantation, cultivating their own produce to sell. In 1899, the Mississippi River presented excitement when in the late winter, ice could be seen floating downstream. The ice flows jammed the river, interrupting ship traffic for several days.

In early Edgard, a favorite event of many townspeople was the arrival of the showboat, which would dock at Caire's Landing. They never knew when the next boat would arrive. When it did and sounded its calliope, the instrument could be heard as far away as Wallace. Modern vessels still pass by on the river.

== Geography ==
Edgard is located on the west bank of the Mississippi River and has an elevation of 13 feet (4.0 m).

According to the United States Census Bureau, the CDP has a total area of 17.9 square miles (46 km^{2}), of which 15.5 square miles (40 km^{2}) is land and 2.3 square miles (6.0 km^{2}) (13.09%) is water.

== Demographics ==
Historical population
Census	Pop.	Note	%±
1990	2,753		—
2000	2,637		−4.2%
2010	2,441		−7.4%
2020	1,948		−20.2%
U.S. Decennial Census; 1950 1960 1970 1980; 1990 2000 2010

Edgard first appeared as a census designated place the 1990 U.S. census.

Edgard CDP, Louisiana – Racial and ethnic composition Note: the U.S. Census Bureau treats Hispanic/Latino as an ethnic category. This table excludes Latinos from the racial categories and assigns them to a separate category. Hispanics/Latinos may be of any race.
Race / Ethnicity (NH = Non-Hispanic)	Pop 2000	Pop 2010	Pop 2020	% 2000	% 2010	% 2020
White alone (NH)	121	108	90	4.59%	4.42%	4.62%
Black or African American alone (NH)	2,499	2,299	1,741	94.77%	94.18%	89.37%
Native American or Alaska Native alone (NH)	0	1	1	0.00%	0.04%	0.05%
Asian alone (NH)	0	0	1	0.00%	0.00%	0.05%
Native Hawaiian or Pacific Islander alone (NH)	1	0	1	0.04%	0.00%	0.05%
Other race alone (NH)	5	5	3	0.19%	0.20%	0.15%
Mixed race or Multiracial (NH)	7	8	99	0.27%	0.33%	5.08%
Hispanic or Latino (any race)	4	20	12	0.15%	0.82%	0.62%
Total	2,637	2,441	1,948	100.00%	100.00%	100.00%

As of the 2020 United States census, there were 1,948 people, 571 households, and 348 families residing in the CDP.

As of the census of 2000, there were 2,637 people, 857 households, and 695 families residing in the CDP. The population density was 169.7 inhabitants per square mile (65.5/km^{2}). There were 905 housing units at an average density of 58.2 units per square mile (22.5 units/km^{2}). The racial makeup of the CDP was 4.59% White, 94.84% African American, 0.04% Pacific Islander, 0.27% from other races, and 0.27% from two or more races. The cultural groups for Hispanic or Latino of any race were 0.15% of the population.

There were 857 households, out of which 36.3% had children under the age of 18 living with them, 45.4% were married couples living together, 30.2% had a female householder with no husband present, and 18.9% were non-families. 17.5% of all households were made up of individuals, and 7.4% had someone living alone who was 65 years of age or older. The average household size was 3.08 and the average family size was 3.51.

In the CDP, the population was spread out, with 29.4% under the age of 18, 9.7% from 18 to 24, 26.0% from 25 to 44, 23.4% from 45 to 64, and 11.6% who were 65 years of age or older. The median age was 35 years. For every 100 females, there were 86.8 males. For every 100 females age 18 and over, there were 83.8 males.

The median income for a household in the CDP was $24,865, and the median income for a family was $29,706. Males had a median income of $31,029 versus $22,688 for females. The per capita income for the CDP was $10,635. About 25.9% of families and 29.5% of the population were below the poverty line, including 31.3% of those under age 18 and 34.5% of those age 65 or over.

== Education ==
St. John the Baptist Parish School Board operates public schools in the community.

== Notable people ==
- Dave Bartholomew, a musician and songwriter who was a 1991 inductee to the Rock and Roll Hall of Fame.
- George E. Burch, Medical school professor and cardiologist of international repute.
- Robert R. Burch, physician, author, and inventor.
- Etienne J. Caire, sugar cane farmer, businessman, owned the E. J. Caire Store in Edgard for many years; Republican candidate for governor in 1928 against Huey Pierce Long Jr.
- Gerard Walton Caire (born 1931), Republican judge of the 40th Judicial District Court in Edgard; grandson of Etienne J. Caire
- Sidonie de la Houssaye, 19th century writer
- Dave Malone, guitarist/vocalist, and sometimes songwriter, of The Radiators.
- Tommy Malone, guitarist/vocalist, and songwriter, of The Subdudes.
- Steve Amedee, percussionist of The Subdudes.
- Terry Robiskie, a former American football player and current wide receivers coach for the Atlanta Falcons.
- Tyson Jackson, who was selected with the number three pick in the 2009 NFL draft by the Kansas City Chiefs. This was the highest selection of any Louisiana State University defensive player ever at the time of the pick. Tyson net worth is over 43 million US dollars.
- Quinn Johnson, who was selected by the Packers in the fifth round of the 2009 NFL Draft, attended Louisiana State University.
- Juan Joseph, who was selected in 2009 by the Edmonton Eskimos of the Canadian Football League. Juan was the 2008 Conerly Trophy winner while attending Millsaps College.
