= Wallace, Louisiana =

Wallace
- Census-designated place
- Location of Wallace in Louisiana
- Coordinates: 30°02′26″N 90°39′59″W
- Country: United States
- State: Louisiana
- Parish: St. John the Baptist

Area
  - Total: 7.70 sq mi (19.95 km^{2})
  - Land: 6.46 sq mi (16.72 km^{2})
  - Water: 1.25 sq mi (3.24 km^{2})
- Elevation: 20 ft (6.1 m)

Population (2020)
  - Total: 755
  - Density: 117.0/sq mi (45.17/km^{2})
- Time zone: UTC-6 (CST)
  - Summer (DST): UTC-5 (CDT)
- Area code: 985
- FIPS code: 22-79275

Wallace is a census-designated place (CDP) in St. John the Baptist Parish, Louisiana, United States. As of the 2020 census, Wallace had a population of 755. It is part of the New Orleans–Metairie–Kenner Metropolitan Statistical Area. The rural community is on the west bank of the Mississippi River and easily accessible to Interstate 10 via the Gramercy Bridge.

It is the site of Evergreen Plantation, designated a National Historic Landmark in 1992. Evergreen is unusual for having 22 surviving slave quarters buildings. It is one of the most complete plantations in the South. Because of its significance, it was selected as one of the sites on the Louisiana African American Heritage Trail.

The Whitney Plantation is also located here. Also a designated site on the state heritage trail, this historic complex opened to the public in 2014. It is the first plantation museum in the country dedicated to the slave experience. The museum includes a plantation main house, and relocated church and outbuildings. There is a newly commissioned multi-part slave memorial, containing the names of thousands of slaves in Louisiana, and other public art related to slavery history. In addition, a memorial and information commemorate the 1811 German Coast Uprising, a slave revolt that occurred in this region soon after it was acquired by the United States, during the Territory of Orleans period.

== Geography ==
Wallace is located at 30°2′26″N 90°39′59″W (30.040492, -90.666471).

According to the United States Census Bureau, the CDP has a total area of 7.6 square miles (19.6 km^{2}), of which 6.5 square miles (16.9 km^{2}) is land and 1.0 square mile (2.7 km^{2}) (13.77%) is water.

== Demographics ==
Historical population
Census	Pop.	Note	%±
2000	570		—
2010	671		17.7%
2020	755		12.5%
U.S. Decennial Census

Wallace was first listed as a census designated place in the 2000 U.S. census.

Wallace CDP, Louisiana – Racial and ethnic composition Note: the US census treats Hispanic/Latino as an ethnic category. This table excludes Latinos from the racial categories and assigns them to a separate category. Hispanics/Latinos may be of any race.
Race / Ethnicity (NH = Non-Hispanic)	Pop 2000	Pop 2010	Pop 2020	% 2000	% 2010	% 2020
White alone (NH)	35	47	61	6.14%	7.00%	8.08%
Black or African American alone (NH)	534	607	663	93.68%	90.46%	87.81%
Native American or Alaska Native alone (NH)	0	1	1	0.00%	0.15%	0.13%
Asian alone (NH)	0	0	0	0.00%	0.00%	0.00%
Native Hawaiian or Pacific Islander alone (NH)	0	0	0	0.00%	0.00%	0.00%
Other race alone (NH)	0	0	2	0.00%	0.00%	0.26%
Mixed race or Multiracial (NH)	0	6	20	0.00%	0.89%	2.65%
Hispanic or Latino (any race)	1	10	8	0.18%	1.49%	1.06%
Total	570	671	755	100.00%	100.00%	100.00%

As of the 2020 United States census, there were 755 people, 382 households, and 348 families residing in the CDP. As of the census of 2000, there were 570 people, 174 households, and 144 families residing in the CDP. The population density was 87.6 inhabitants per square mile (33.8/km^{2}). There were 195 housing units at an average density of 30.0 per square mile (11.6/km^{2}). The racial makeup of the CDP was 6.14% White and 93.86% African American. Hispanic or Latino of any race were 0.18% of the population.

There were 174 households, out of which 37.4% had children under the age of 18 living with them, 50.6% were married couples living together, 28.2% had a female householder with no husband present, and 16.7% were non-families. 16.1% of all households were made up of individuals, and 7.5% had someone living alone who was 65 years of age or older. The average household size was 3.28 and the average family size was 3.70.

In the CDP, the population was spread out, with 29.3% under the age of 18, 10.5% from 18 to 24, 26.8% from 25 to 44, 23.2% from 45 to 64, and 10.2% who were 65 years of age or older. The median age was 33 years. For every 100 females, there were 96.6 males. For every 100 females age 18 and over, there were 87.4 males.

The median income for a household in the CDP was $19,118, and the median income for a family was $25,179. Males had a median income of $31,250 versus $11,250 for females. The per capita income for the CDP was $6,625. About 35.6% of families and 45.5% of the population were below the poverty line, including 51.1% of those under age 18 and 34.7% of those age 65 or over.

== Education ==
St. John the Baptist Parish School Board operates public schools in the community.

Areas in Wallace are zoned to:

- West St. John Elementary School
- West St. John High School

== Notable people ==
- Cousin Joe (1907–1989), blues singer
- Ernest "Doc" Paulin (1907–2007), New Orleans jazz musician
- Maurice Schexnayder (1895–1981), Bishop of Lafayette in Louisiana from 1956 to 1972
