= Rural African American Museum =

African American Museum in Opelousas, Louisiana

- Established: 2018
- Location: 1414 North Main Street, Opelousas, Louisiana, 70570
- Coordinates: 30°32′48″N 92°4′46″W
- Type: History museum
- Collections: African-American history
- Founder: Wilken Jones

The Rural African American Museum is a museum in Opelousas that focuses on the history of African Americans living in St. Landry Parish, Louisiana, United States, from the American Civil War to the present. It was inaugurated in late 2018 and is free to tour, although its operations rely primarily on donations. The museum's creator and president is Wilken Jones, a retired social studies school teacher who grew up in the nearby town of Plaisance. The permanent exposition showcases books, objects and press clippings that pertain to the economic, religious and political history of the region. The items on display include antique bedroom furniture, kitchen utensils and farm tools, among other things. The exposition illustrates the conditions of life of many Black sharecroppers in the late 19th and early 20th century.

In July 2019, the museum offered a summer camp program to accommodate children affected by the destruction of their churches, following the burning of three Black Baptist churches in St. Landry Parish in April 2019. The museum's activities also feature various public outreach programs aimed at honoring the work of members of the local African American community.

== See also ==
- List of museums in Louisiana
- Louisiana African American Heritage Trail
- List of museums focused on African Americans
