= Etienne J. Caire =

American businessman and planter (1868–1955)

Etienne Joseph Caire I
- Born: September 17, 1868; Edgard, Louisiana, U.S.
- Died: July 16, 1955 (aged 86); Edgard, Louisiana, U.S.
- Resting place: St. John the Baptist Cemetery in Edgard
- Education: Jefferson College
- Occupations: Businessman, proprietor of the E. J. Caire & Co. store Sugar cane farmer Banker
- Political party: Republican
- Spouse: Laura Hymel Caire (m. 1889; died 1942)
- Children: Etiennette Marie Caire; Denis F. Caire; Sidney Caire, Sr. James J. Caire; Laurence Caire; Therese Caire
- Parent(s): Jean Baptiste Caire; Felicie Burcard (later Mrs. Graugnard)

Étienne Joseph Caire I (September 17, 1868 – July 16, 1955), was an American merchant, pharmacist, sugar cane planter, and banker from Edgard in St. John the Baptist Parish, Louisiana. He ran in 1928 as the Republican nominee for Governor of Louisiana when he challenged populist Democrat Huey Long He received only four percent of the vote. That year the Republican Party ran a slate of candidates for statewide offices for the first time since the late 19th century.

== Political career ==
Caire had joined the Republican Party in Louisiana, although the great majority of whites belonged to the Democratic Party in those years. During Reconstruction, the Republican Party composed both black and white members, as well as former free people of color, who were mixed race. Following the passage of a new state constitution in 1898, which raised barriers to voter registration, most blacks in Louisiana were disenfranchised for decades into the late 20th century. The much smaller party consisted mostly of whites.

As Caire became more successful in his businesses, he was approached to run for office in 1928. The state Republican Party planned to run a full slate of Republicans for statewide office, for the first time since Democrats had regained power after Reconstruction. They nominated Caire to run for governor.

Caire polled 3,733 votes (4 percent) of the ballots cast in the 1928 general election compared to the overwhelming 96,941 (96 percent) for the Democratic populist Huey Pierce Long, Jr. Long had already become known for his flamboyant, popular oratory while serving as a member of the Louisiana Public Service Commission.

Caire was the last Louisiana Republican Party gubernatorial candidate for twenty-four years. In 1952, popular World War II General Dwight D. Eisenhower, commander of the victorious Allied Forces in Europe, ran as the Republican candidate for President of the United States. With his candidacy proposed, the Louisiana Republicans decided to support a candidate for governor. Harrison Bagwell, a Baton Rouge lawyer, carried the party's banner in the general election against Democrat Robert F. Kennon, a judge from Minden in Webster Parish in North Louisiana. But Louisiana was still part of the Solid South, and an overwhelmingly Democratic state among most voters who were allowed to vote. (Disenfranchisement still kept most blacks out of politics.) Bagwell polled 4 percent of the vote, in a low-turnout contest.

== See also ==
- National Register of Historic Places listings in St. John the Baptist Parish, Louisiana – has a photo of E. J. Caire & Co. store, "Caire's Landing."

Preceded by James S. Millikin (1924)	Louisiana Republican Party gubernatorial nominee 1928	Succeeded by Harrison Bagwell (1952)
