= St. John the Baptist Parish School Board =

School district in St. John the Baptist Parish, Louisiana, United States

Coordinates: 30.0561°N 90.5636°W

St. John the Baptist Parish School Board is a school district headquartered in unincorporated St. John the Baptist Parish, Louisiana, United States.

It serves all of St. John the Baptist Parish.

== School uniforms ==
All schools in the district require school uniforms.

== Schools ==
All schools are located in unincorporated areas.

=== High schools ===
- East St. John High School (Reserve)
- West St. John High School

=== K-8 schools ===
Zoned

- Garyville-Mt. Airy Math and Science Magnet School (Zoned and magnet)
- Lake Pontchartrain Elementary School
  - It was originally named the Glade School. The initial 22-acre (8.9 ha) facility first began operations in 1989 and had a cost of $6 million. Of all of the school district's schools, it had the highest number of students at the time, which exceeded 1,300. In 2005 the school received its next name and had changes in its mascot and school colors. In 2012 Hurricane Isaac damaged the facility. The planned replacement facility is a smaller size than the previous one. In 2014 the estimated cost of the next facility was $22,500,000, and the projected opening year was 2017. Yeates & Yeates Architects was chosen as the architectural firm.
- LaPlace Elementary School
- Emily C. Watkins Elementary School - groundbreaking in 2007
  - It opened in 2009. It was originally supposed to open in 2008, but its opening was delayed. By 2011, the school had perennial issues with its HVAC system. In that period, the school had to have colder than planned temperatures to avoid mold and mildew issues.
- John L. Ory Communication Arts Magnet School

=== K-7 ===
- West St. John Elementary School

Magnet

=== 5-8 schools ===
- East St. John Preparatory Academy (formerly East St. John Elementary School) (Reserve CDP, LaPlace postal address) - The Times-Picayune describes the school as being in LaPlace. It had a fire in 2015, and its 65,000-square-foot (6,000 m^{2}) replacement facility opened in 2018. In 2025 East St. John Preparatory School is to be renamed Fifth Ward Preparatory School, as the former Fifth Ward Elementary School will close that year.

=== K-4 schools ===
- Fifth Ward Elementary School
  - Historically the institution was a segregated school for African-American students. Previously the facility was a junior high school. In 2024, most of the students were African-American. It is adjacent to a chemical plant owned by Denka Performance Elastomer. It is scheduled to close in 2025, and East St. John Preparatory School in turn is to be renamed Fifth Ward Preparatory School.

=== Alternative schools ===
- Leon Godchaux Accelerated Program
