= List of storms named Isaac =

The name Isaac (or the variant Isaack) has been used for six tropical cyclones in the Atlantic Ocean and for one in the South Pacific Ocean. The name has also been used for one extratropical european windstorm.

In the Atlantic:

- Tropical Storm Isaac (1988) – short-lived storm, caused flooding in Trinidad and Tobago.
- Hurricane Isaac (2000) – reached Category 4 strength, stayed in the open sea, but caused one fatality after a boat got capsized near Long Island.
- Hurricane Isaac (2006) – Category 1, passed well east of Bermuda, became extratropical near Newfoundland.
- Hurricane Isaac (2012) – large and destructive Category 1 hurricane that hit Louisiana causing over $3 billion in damages.
- Hurricane Isaac (2018) – minimal hurricane that passed through the Lesser Antilles and dissipated in the eastern Caribbean Sea.
- Hurricane Isaac (2024) – a high-latitude Category 2 hurricane that did not affect land.

In the South Pacific:

- Cyclone Isaac (1982) – struck Tonga

In Europe:

- Storm Isaack (2023) – impacted southwestern Europe
