= 1928 Louisiana gubernatorial election =

1928 Louisiana Democratic gubernatorial primary
- January 17, 1928
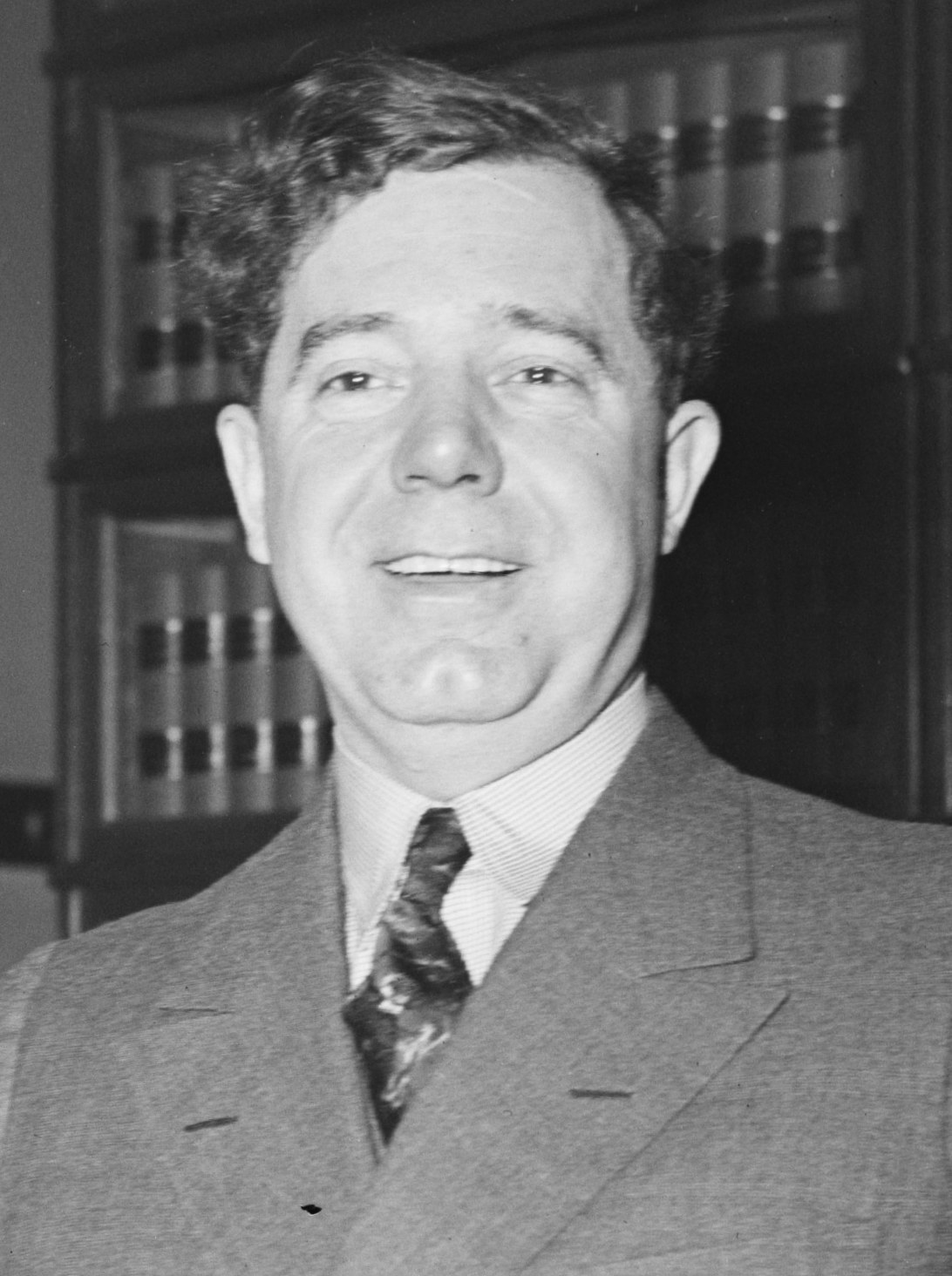

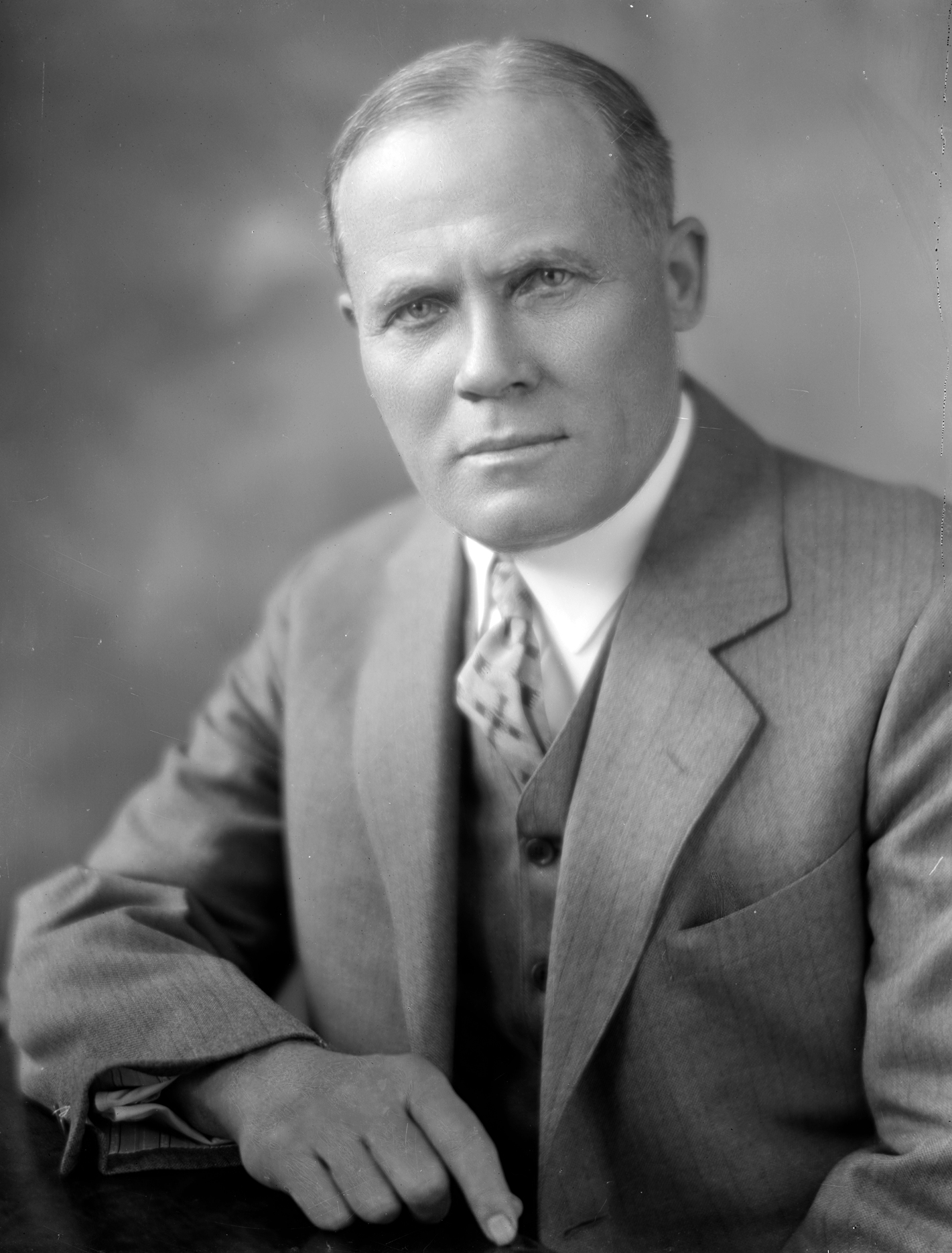

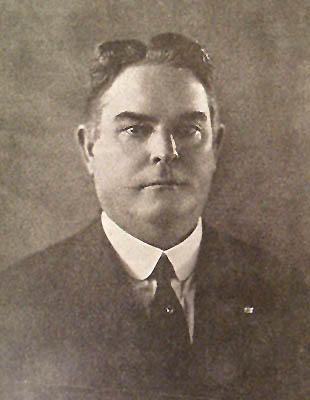
Candidate	Huey P. Long	Riley J. Wilson	Oramel H. Simpson
Party	Democratic	Democratic	Democratic
Popular vote	126,842	81,747	80,326
Percentage	43.90%	28.29%	27.80%
Parish Results
Long
40–50%
50–60%
60–70%
70–80%
Wilson
40–50%
50–60%
70–80%
Simpson
40–50%
50–60%
60–70%
Governor before election
Oramel H. Simpson
Democratic
Elected Governor
Huey Long
Democratic

The 1928 Louisiana gubernatorial election was held on April 17, 1928. Like in most Southern states between the Reconstruction era and the civil rights movement, Louisiana's Republican Party was virtually nonexistent in terms of electoral support. This meant that the Democratic primary held on January 17 was essentially the real contest to decide the governor, as winning the Democratic nomination would be tantamount to election as governor.

The 1928 election resulted in the election of Huey Long as Governor of Louisiana, and created a political realignment in the state between Long and anti-Long factions that lasted for several decades.

== Background ==
Huey Long of Winnfield had begun his 1928 campaign for governor shortly after being defeated in the 1924 election. This time around, Long had managed to secure more campaign funding from contributors like New Orleans businessman Robert Maestri. He had greatly raised his public profile, in part due to his strategic decision to campaign on behalf of Catholic candidates Edwin S. Broussard and Joseph E. Ransdell in the U.S. Senate races of 1924 and 1926. This gave him a significant boost in support in Catholic southern Louisiana. He had also built a reputation due to frequent radio appearances and newspaper stories, and had built a stronger campaign organization than he had in 1924.

Four intervening years had made Louisiana's political and economic establishment begin to see Long as a threat. Consisting of wealthy planters, businessmen, and New Orleans's Regular Democratic Organization political bosses, the political leadership of the state united behind the candidacy of U.S. Congressman Riley J. Wilson of Ruston in July 1927. His campaign focused on the threat of Long's radicalism; a banner reading "It Won’t Be Long Now" was featured prominently at Wilson's campaign stops. Wilson's reputation was tainted by his connection to what was perceived to be an inadequate federal response to the Great Mississippi Flood of 1927; he was the ranking member of Congress's Flood Control Committee.

In 1926, Governor Henry L. Fuqua died in office and was succeeded by Oramel H. Simpson. Simpson announced his campaign for the next term, but was generally not considered a strong enough candidate to face Long by the Democratic establishment. Like Wilson, his support also faltered after his response to the 1927 flood, and he was handicapped by a reputation for alcoholism.

== Democratic primary ==
=== Candidates ===
- Huey P. Long, Winnfield attorney and candidate for Governor in 1924
- Oramel H. Simpson, incumbent Governor since 1926
- Riley J. Wilson, U.S. Representative from Ruston

=== Campaign ===
Despite negative coverage by the majority of the state's newspapers, Long managed to gain the support of the New Orleans States and the Shreveport Times. The New Orleans Times-Picayune and the Shreveport Caucasian supported Simpson, while the New Orleans Item supported Wilson. Long's seemingly inexhaustible energy gave him an advantage, as he managed to travel extensively across the state, making several stops a day in rural areas neglected by the other candidates. Long's theatrical oratory combined insulting his opponents and the corporations he blamed for the state's underdevelopment with promising increased educational funding, free textbooks, public hospitals, and free bridges and road improvements. He also campaigned against the corruption and wastefulness of previous administrations. Simpson and Wilson, offering only bland defenses of the status quo, were often overwhelmed when appearing alongside Long at debates and other campaign events. A widely publicized fistfight between Long and former governor Jared Y. Sanders during the campaign did nothing to damage Long's popularity.

Long spent the intervening four years building his reputation and political organization, particularly in the more urban South, which was heavily Roman Catholic due to its French and Spanish heritage. Despite disagreeing with their politics, Long endorsed and campaigned for Catholic US Senators in 1924 and 1926. Thanks to alleged government mismanagement during the Great Mississippi Flood of 1927, which has been compared to the aftermath of Hurricane Katrina, Long gained the support of Cajuns, rural Catholics whose land had been heavily affected. He officially launched his campaign in 1927, campaigning with the slogan, "Every man a king, but no one wears a crown," a phrase adopted from Democratic presidential candidate William Jennings Bryan. By 1928, Long had gained such momentum, that he became one of the major talking points of his opponents; opposing political conventions chanted "It won't be Long now."

Long was a fervent critic of a toll bridge being constructed across Lake Pontchartrain by incumbent Governor Oramel H. Simpson, instead promising a toll-free bridge. Long developed novel campaign techniques, including the use of sound trucks at mass meetings and radio commercials. His stance on race was unorthodox. Unlike other southern demagogues, Long was, according to T. Harry Williams, "the first Southern mass leader to leave aside race baiting and appeals to the Southern tradition and the Southern past and address himself to the social and economic problems of the present." (Note: The conclusion that Long was progressive on the issue of race, widely repeated in the decades after Long's death, has faced increased scrutiny in recent years.) The campaign sometimes descended into brutality. When the 60-year-old Simpson called Long a liar during a chance encounter in the lobby of the Roosevelt Hotel, Long punched him in the face.

=== Results ===
1928 Democratic gubernatorial primary
Party	Candidate	Votes	%
Democratic	Huey P. Long	126,842	43.90%
Democratic	Riley J. Wilson	81,747	28.29%
Democratic	Oramel H. Simpson	80,326	27.80%
Total votes		288,915	100.00%

Following the lopsided showings of the primary, Simpson refused to support Wilson in the runoff and Wilson withdrew from the race.

Long carried 47 of 64 parishes, including the majority of rural parishes in both Anglo-Saxon Protestant northern and French Catholic southern Louisiana, a nearly unprecedented accomplishment up to that time. Only New Orleans, still firmly controlled by the Regular Democratic Organization, spurned Long in favor of the machine's chosen candidate Wilson. The political upheaval of Long's 1928 victory spurred a realignment in Louisiana politics based on urban-rural and class-based divisions rather than the religious and cultural divisions which had predominated up to that time. In every state election from 1928 to 1960, the legacy of Huey Long would be the primary campaign issue.

== General election ==
=== Candidates ===
- Etienne J. Caire, St. John the Baptist Parish sugar cane farmer and businessman (Republican)
- Huey Long, Winnfield attorney and candidate for Governor in 1924 (Democratic)

Long faced a Republican opponent named Etienne J. Caire, who was a sugar cane farmer and businessman from St. John the Baptist Parish. In the end, Caire polled 4 percent of the vote.

=== Results ===
1928 Louisiana gubernatorial election
Party	Candidate	Votes	%	±%
Democratic	Huey P. Long	92,941	96.14%	▼0.96
Republican	Etienne J. Caire	3,733	3.86%	▲0.96
Total votes		96,674	100.00%	

== Sources ==
Compilation of Primary Election Returns of the Democratic Party, State of Louisiana. 1928.

Hair, William Ivy. The Kingfish and His Realm: The Life and Times of Huey P. Long. LSU Press, 1991.

White, Richard. Kingfish: The Reign of Huey P. Long. Random House, 2006.

Williams, T. Harry. Huey Long. Knopf, 1970.
