= Our Lady of Grace Church =

Our Lady of Grace Church, or variations including Our Lady of Grace Catholic Church and Church of Our Lady of Grace, may refer to:

== India ==
- Our Lady of Grace Church (Chorão Island)
- Basilica of Our Lady of Graces
- Basilica of Our Lady of Divine Grace

== Malta ==
- Our Lady of Graces Chapel, Qrendi
- Parish Church of Our Lady of Graces, Żabbar

== Spain ==
- Church of Our Lady of Grace, Cartagena

== United States ==
- Our Lady of Grace Church (Stratford, Connecticut)
- Our Lady of Grace Church (Reserve, Louisiana), listed on the National Register of Historic Places in St. John the Baptist Parish, Louisiana
- Church of Our Lady of Grace (Hoboken, New Jersey), listed on the National Register of Historic Places
- Our Lady of Grace Catholic Church (Greensboro, North Carolina)

== United Kingdom ==
- Our Lady of Grace Church, London

See also

- Our Lady of Grace (disambiguation)
