= Our Lady of the Assumption Church =

Our Lady of the Assumption Church may refer to:

== Azerbaijan ==
- Our Lady of Assumption Church (Bulakan)

== Belgium ==
- Church of the Assumption of Our Lady (Zottegem)

== Canada ==
- Our Lady of the Assumption (Windsor, Ontario)

== France ==
- Église Notre-Dame de l'Assomption, Bergheim
- Church of Our Lady of the Assumption, Gustavia, on the Caribbean island of Saint Barthélemy
- Church of Our Lady of the Assumption, Lorient, Saint Barthélemy
- Église Notre-Dame de l'Assomption, Metz
- Église Notre-Dame de l'Assomption, Rouffach
- Our Lady of the Assumption Church, Sainte-Marie
- Church of Our Lady of the Assumption, Stains

== Ireland ==
- Church of Our Lady of the Assumption, Ballyfermot, Dublin

== Italy ==
- Our Lady of the Assumption Church, Caselle Landi

== Netherlands ==
- Our Lady of the Assumption Church, Loosduinen, The Hague

== New Zealand ==
- Church of Our Lady of the Assumption, Onehunga
- Church of Our Lady of the Assumption, Motukaraka

== Philippines ==
- Our Lady of the Assumption Parish Church, or Maragondon Church, Cavite
- Church of Our Lady of the Assumption, Ilocos Sur, or Santa Maria Church

== Russia ==
- Church of Our Lady of the Assumption, Irkutsk
- Church of Our Lady of the Assumption, Kursk
- Our Lady of the Assumption Church, Novocherkassk

== Spain ==
- Church of Our Lady of the Assumption, Villamelendro de Valdavia

== United Kingdom ==
- Church of the Assumption of Our Lady, Torquay, Devon, England
- Church of Our Lady of the Assumption and St Gregory, London, England
- Church of Our Lady of the Assumption, Englefield Green, Surrey, England
- Our Lady of the Assumption Church, Rhyl, Denbighshire, Wales

== United States ==
- Our Lady of the Assumption Church (Fairfield, Connecticut)
- Our Lady of the Assumption Church (Westport, Connecticut)

== See also ==
- Cathedral of Our Lady of the Assumption (disambiguation), including uses of Our Lady of the Assumption Cathedral
- Cathedral of the Assumption (disambiguation)
- Church of the Assumption (disambiguation)
