= Our Lady of Grace (disambiguation) =

Our Lady of Grace is a title of the Blessed Virgin Mary. It may also refer to:

== France ==
- Nostre Dame de Grasse, a statue in France

== India ==
- Our Lady of Grace Church (Chorão Island), Goa

== Malta ==
- Our Lady of Graces Chapel, Qrendi
- Parish Church of Our Lady of Graces, Żabbar

== United Kingdom ==
- Church of Our Lady of Grace & St Edward, Chiswick, London
- Our Lady of Grace Church, London

== United States ==
- Our Lady of Grace (Encino), California
- Our Lady of Grace Church (Stratford, Connecticut)
- Our Lady of Grace Church (Reserve, Louisiana)
- Church of Our Lady of Grace (Hoboken, New Jersey)
- Our Lady of Grace Catholic Church (Greensboro, North Carolina)

== See also ==
- Our Lady of Grace Cathedral (disambiguation)
- Church of Our Lady (disambiguation)
- Notre-Dame-de-Grâce, a neighbourhood in Montreal, Canada
