= Our Lady of Peace Church (Stratford, Connecticut) =

Coordinates: 41°09′08.10″N 73°07′07.64″W

- Our Lady of Peace Church
- Location: 230 Park Boulevard; Stratford, Connecticut
- Country: United States
- Denomination: Roman Catholic

Architecture
- Architect(s): J. Gerald Phelan church Andrew G. Patrick parish hall

Administration
- Province: Hartford
- Diocese: Bridgeport

Clergy
- Bishop: Most Rev. William E. Lori

Our Lady of Peace is a Roman Catholic church in Stratford, Connecticut, part of the Diocese of Bridgeport.

== History ==
The area served by the church was home to 120 Catholic families in 1938. This church is a replica of a country church in Normandy, France and is located in the Lordship section of Stratford. It was designed in 1939 by the highly regarded local church architect J. Gerald Phelan. The design of this church was featured in the quarterly publication of the Liturgical Arts Society.

The church also owns a parish hall designed by Andrew G. Patrick of Stratford.

Briefly a pastor for the parish in 1988, Reverend Albert McGoldrick was accused in the Catholic sexual abuse scandals.

The church was a site for relief supplies after the June 2010 tornado.
