= St. Pius X Church =

St. Pius X Church, or St. Pius X Parish or other variations, may refer to:

- St. Pius X Church, St. John's, Canada
- Iglesia de San Pío X (Todoque), La Palma, Spain
- St. Pius X Church (Fairfield, Connecticut), United States
- Saint Pius X Catholic Church in Honolulu, Hawaii, United States
- St. Pius X Catholic Church, Dallas
- St. Pius Tenth Catholic Church (Owensboro, Kentucky), United States

== See also ==
- St. Pius X High School (disambiguation)
