= Andrew Patrick =

Andrew Patrick may refer to:

- Andrew G. Patrick (1907–1955), American architect
- Andrew Patrick (diplomat) (born 1966), British diplomat
