= Andrew G. Patrick =

American architect (1907–1955)

- Born: 1907; Bridgeport, Connecticut, U.S.
- Died: 1955 (aged 47–48)
- Known for: Architect

Andrew G. Patrick (1907–1955) was an American architect who specialized in churches and schools, mostly for Catholic clients in Connecticut.

== Early life and education ==
Patrick was born in Bridgeport, Connecticut, in 1905. He lived in Stratford, Connecticut, where he attended the university school. He graduated from Notre Dame School of Architecture in 1931 and thereafter served in the military for a time.

== Architectural practice ==
He then worked with the architectural firm Fletcher-Thompson where he was associated with noted architect J. Gerald Phelan. Both men designed many churches, schools, convents and rectories for Catholic clients.

== Works ==
- Our Lady of Good Counsel Church, Bridgeport, Connecticut
- Holy Name of Jesus Church, Stratford, Connecticut
- St. James School, Stratford, Connecticut
- St. James Church, Stratford, Connecticut (redesign of church built by J. Gerald Phelan)
- Auditorium, Our Lady of Peace Church, Stratford, Connecticut
- Our Lady Of Grace Church, Stratford, Connecticut
- St. Stephen Church, Trumbull, Connecticut
