= Holy Name of Jesus Church (Stratford, Connecticut) =

Coordinates: 41°11′33.94″N 73°08′50.78″W

- Holy Name of Jesus Church
- Location: 1950 Barnum Avenue; Stratford, Connecticut
- Country: United States
- Denomination: Roman Catholic

Architecture
- Architect: Andrew G. Patrick

Administration
- Province: Hartford
- Diocese: Bridgeport

Clergy
- Bishop: Most Rev. Frank Joseph Caggiano
- Priest(s): Msgr. J. James Cuneo, J.C.D. Rev. Churchill Penn
- Pastor: Father James DiVasto

Holy Name of Jesus Parish is a Roman Catholic parish in Stratford, Connecticut, part of the Diocese of Bridgeport.

== History ==
The original church now serves as the church hall. The Gothic Revival church was built to the designs of the highly regarded local church architect Andrew G. Patrick and completed in 1957.

In 1993, a suit was filed against the Diocese by two people claiming they were sexually abused by Reverend Raymond Pcolka. This suit was later joined by eleven more people and led to Pcolka's being defrocked.

== Culture ==
Holy Name hosted the 99th anniversary meeting of Slovensky Katolícky Sokol Group 2, or The Slovak Alliance of Greater Bridgeport, a local chapter of a national Slovak cultural society, and it is the location of monthly meetings of that chapter.
