= Our Lady of the Assumption Church, Sainte-Marie =

Coordinates: 14.7832°N 60.9928°W

Our Lady of the Assumption Church
- Église Notre-Dame-de-l'Assomption de Sainte-Marie
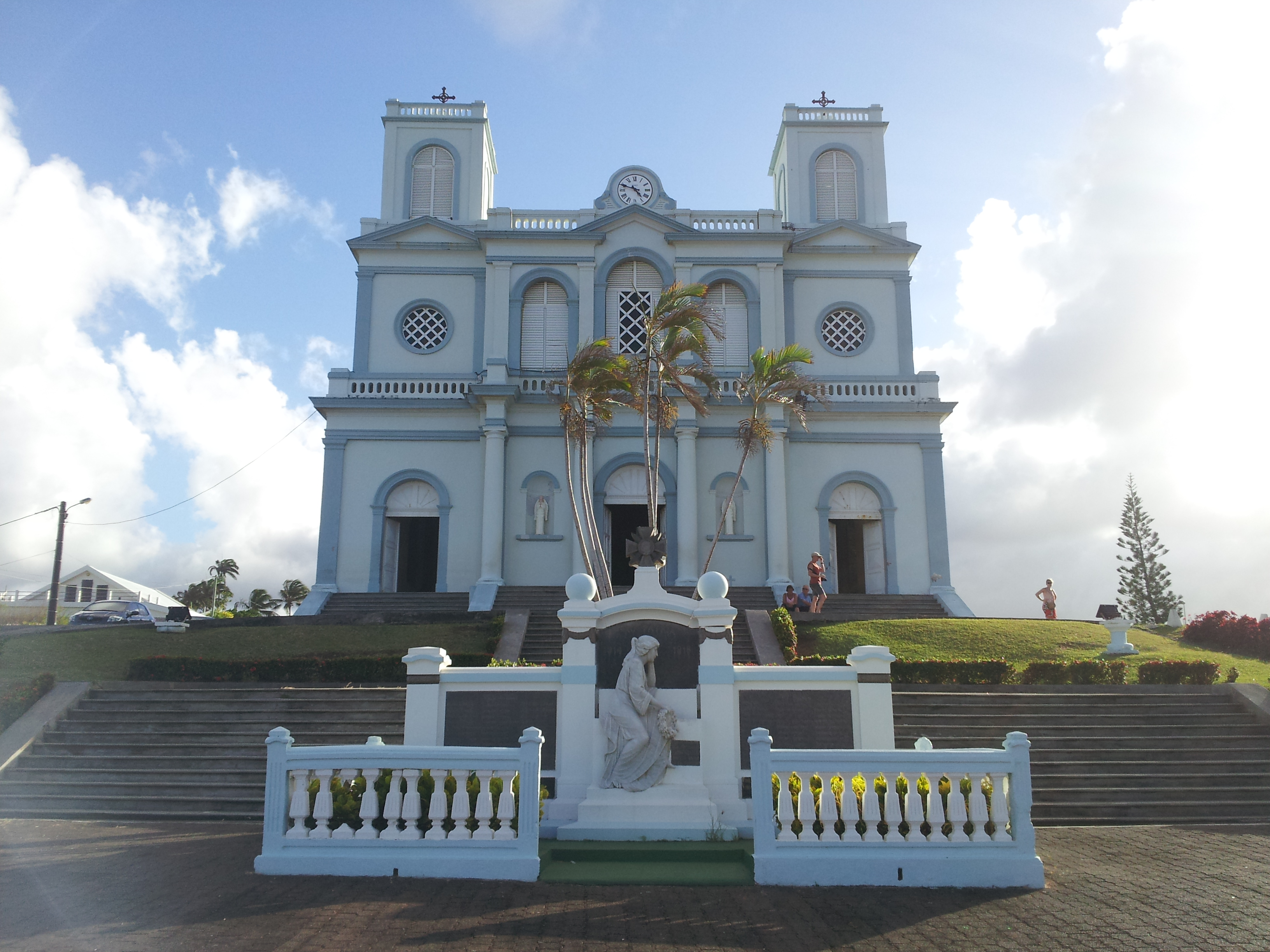
- Our Lady of the Assumption Church
- Location: Martinique
- Country: France
- Denomination: Roman Catholic Church

The Our Lady of the Assumption Church (French: Église Notre-Dame-de-l'Assomption de Sainte-Marie) It is a Catholic church in Sainte-Marie, a town in Martinique, a dependency of France in the Lesser Antilles.

The church is located in the French department of Martinique, in the town of Sainte-Marie in la rue du Cimetière (Cemetery Street).

The Fort of Sainte-Marie was erected in honor of the Virgin Mary and gives its name to the parish of Sainte-Marie in 1658. On January 8, 1663, the Superior Council of the island ordered the formal establishment of the parishes of Sainte-Marie, the Grande Anse and Marigot administered by the Dominicans.

== See also ==
- Roman Catholicism in France
- Our Lady of the Assumption Church (disambiguation)
