= St. Ann Church (Bridgeport, Connecticut) =

Coordinates: 41°09′23.37″N 73°13′31.52″W

- St. Ann Church
- Location: 481 Brewster St; Bridgeport, Connecticut
- Country: United States
- Denomination: Roman Catholic

Architecture
- Architect: J. Gerald Phelan

Administration
- Province: Hartford
- Diocese: Bridgeport

Clergy
- Bishop: Most Rev. William E. Lori

St. Ann Parish is a Roman Catholic church in Bridgeport, Connecticut, part of the Diocese of Bridgeport.

== History ==
Located in the Historic Black Rock section of Bridgeport, this edifice dates from the early 1950s and was designed by noted architect J. Gerald Phelan who designed the main campus of Fairfield University along with many other churches, schools, convents and rectories for Catholic clients in Connecticut and elsewhere.
