= Saint Lawrence Church (Shelton, Connecticut) =

Coordinates: 41.2982°N 73.1465°W

St. Lawrence Church
- St. Lawrence Church
- Location: 505 Shelton Avenue; Shelton, Connecticut
- Country: United States
- Denomination: Roman Catholic

Architecture
- Architect: J. Gerald Phelan

Administration
- Province: Hartford
- Diocese: Bridgeport

Clergy
- Bishop: Most Rev. William E. Lori
- Vicar: Rev Ignacio Ortigas
- Pastor: Rev Michael K Jones

St. Lawrence Parish is a Roman Catholic church in Shelton, Connecticut, part of the Diocese of Bridgeport.

== History ==
St Lawrence Parish is located in the Huntington section of Shelton and, with over 3,000 registered families, is one of the largest parishes in the Diocese. The modern church was constructed shortly after the parish was formed in 1955. The architect was J. Gerald Phelan. A recent renovation doubled the size of the church and added a parish center.
