= St. Pius X High School =

St. Pius X High School may refer to:

== United States ==
- St. Pius X Catholic High School (Chamblee, Georgia), near Atlanta, Georgia
- St. Pius X High School (Crystal City, Missouri)
- St. Pius X Catholic High School (Kansas City, Missouri)
- Pius X High School (Nebraska), Lincoln, Nebraska
- St. Pius X High School (Albuquerque), New Mexico
- Saint Pius X High School (Lower Pottsgrove Township, Pennsylvania)
- St. Pius X High School (Houston), Texas

== Elsewhere ==
- St. Pius X High School (Ottawa), Ontario, Canada
- St. Pius X High School (Magherafelt), Northern Ireland
- Saint Pius X Catholic High School (Rotherham), England

== See also ==
- St. Pius X Church (disambiguation)
- St. Pius X College, Rajapuram, a tertiary college in Rajapuram, Maloth, Kasaragod, India
