= Our Lady of Good Counsel Church (Bridgeport, Connecticut) =

Coordinates: 41°12′59″N 73°11′24″W

- Our Lady of Good Counsel Church
- Location: 163 Ortega Ave; Bridgeport, Connecticut
- Country: United States
- Denomination: Roman Catholic

Architecture
- Architect: Andrew G. Patrick

Administration
- Province: Hartford
- Diocese: Bridgeport

Clergy
- Bishop: Most Rev. Frank Caggiano =

Our Lady of Good Counsel Parish is a Roman Catholic church in Bridgeport, Connecticut, part of the Diocese of Bridgeport.

== History ==
The Chapel opened in 1906 to serve summer residents; the number of visitors grew quickly and the church moved in 1911.

The present church was dedicated October 8, 1950 by the Most Reverend Henry J. O'brien, Bishop of Hartford. The Chapel was designed by Andrew G. Patrick and built by E&F Construction Co. The church was dedicated before more than 800 who gathered to witness the ceremonies. Erected as a mission of St. Patrick Church, the Chapel is located at the corner of Ortega and Funston Avenues in Bridgeport.

In 1997, Monsignor Gregory Smith resigned after accusations of abuse.

In 2011, the church was part of a merger of churches in Bridgeport.

== 2020s ==
In 2023, the Priest Moderator was Father Adriano Biccheri. He moved from Italy to the US in 2022 to take up the role. The community of Koinonia John the Baptist joined in the same year.
