= Holy Family Church (Fairfield, Connecticut) =

Coordinates: 41°10′21.29″N 73°14′01.18″W

- Holy Family Church
- Location: 700 Old Stratfield Road; Fairfield, Connecticut
- Country: United States
- Denomination: Roman Catholic

Architecture
- Architect: J. Gerald Phelan

Administration
- Province: Hartford
- Diocese: Bridgeport

Clergy
- Bishop: Most Rev. William E. Lori

Holy Family is a Roman Catholic parish in Fairfield, Connecticut, part of the Diocese of Bridgeport.

== History ==
The Parish was founded in 1938. The present Gothic Revival church was designed by noted church architect J. Gerald Phelan.
