= Our Lady of Grace Cathedral =

Our Lady of Grace Cathedral may refer to:

- Our Lady of Grace Cathedral, Bafatá, Guinea-Bissau
- Our Lady of Grace Cathedral, Belém, Brazil
- Our Lady of Grace Cathedral, León, Nicaragua
- Our Lady of Grace Cathedral, Nicosia, Cyprus
- Our Lady of Grace Cathedral, São Tomé, São Tomé and Príncipe
- Our Lady of Grace Cathedral, Setúbal, Portugal

== See also ==
- Our Lady of Grace (disambiguation)
