= Blessed Sacrament Church (Bridgeport, Connecticut) =

Coordinates: 41.1757°N 73.1643°W

Blessed Sacrament
- Blessed Sacrament
- Location: 275 Union Ave; Bridgeport, Connecticut
- Country: United States
- Denomination: Roman Catholic
- Website: www.blessedsacramentbpt.org

Architecture
- Architect: J. Gerald Phelan

Administration
- Province: Hartford
- Diocese: Bridgeport

Clergy
- Bishop: Most Rev. Frank Caggiano
- Pastor: Rev. Skip Karcsinsky

Blessed Sacrament Catholic Church is a Black Catholic parish in Bridgeport, Connecticut, in the Diocese of Bridgeport.

== History ==
The church began as a basement church formed under Fr T. B. Smith.

The initial building was built during 1917 and 1918 and was meant to be temporary, but was not added to until 1959. In the meantime, a 16-room school and convent were designed by James A. Jackson was built in 1922. The church was built as a basement church and a superstructure was built around it during 1959 and 1960. The superstructure was designed by J. Gerald Phelan.

The new building was finished and dedicated on December 8, 1960.
