= Reserve, Louisiana =

- unincorporated community census-designated place (CDP)
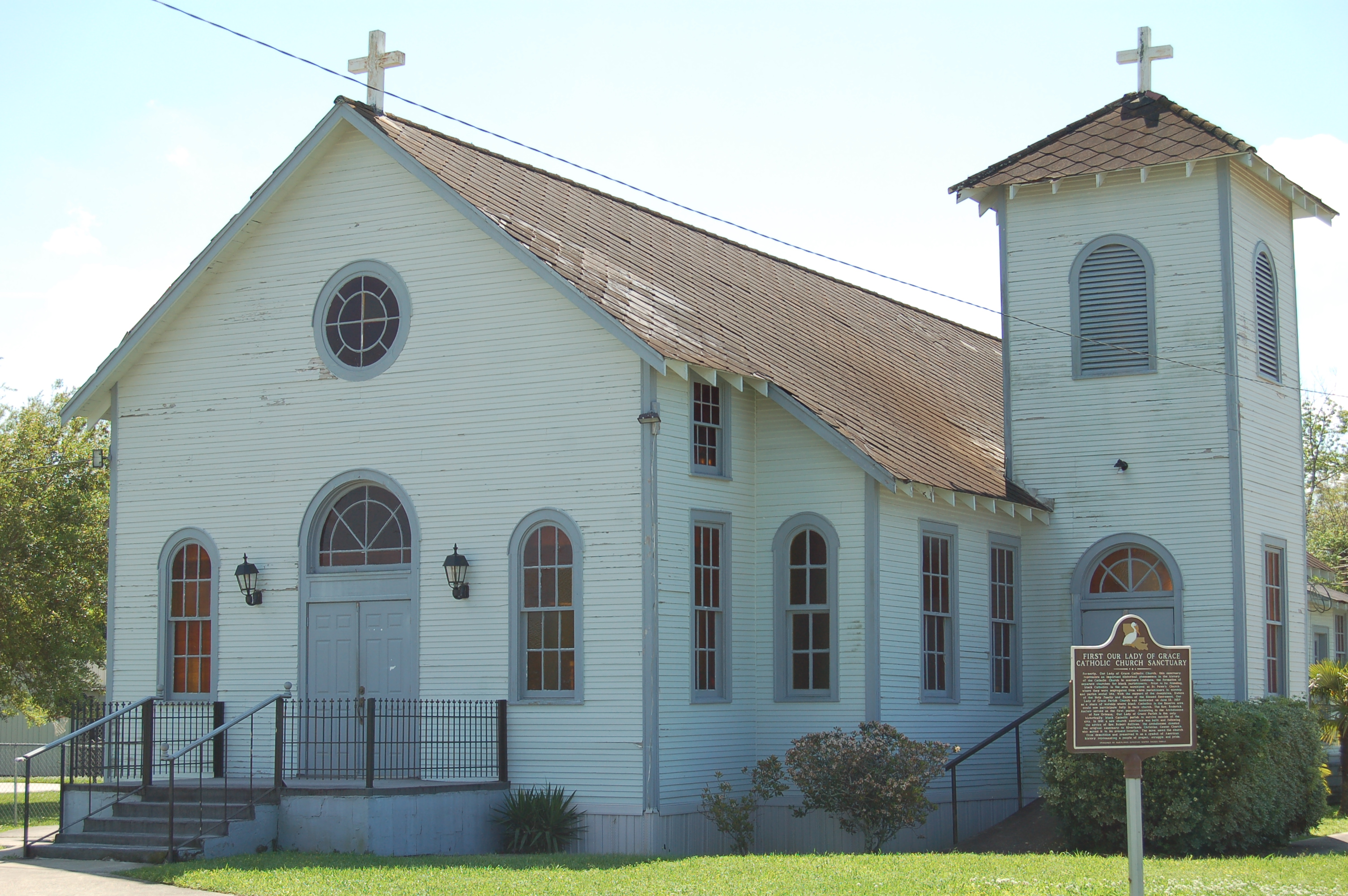
- Our Lady of Grace Church, in Reserve

- Location of Reserve in Louisiana
- Coordinates: 30°03′45″N 90°33′12″W
- Country: United States
- State: Louisiana
- Parish: St. John the Baptist

Area
  - Total: 17.1 sq mi (44 km^{2})
  - Land: 16.1 sq mi (42 km^{2})
  - Water: 1.0 sq mi (2.6 km^{2})
- Elevation: 13 ft (4.0 m)

Population (2020)
  - Total: 8,541
  - Density: 530/sq mi (205/km^{2})
- Time zone: UTC-6 (CST)
  - Summer (DST): UTC-5 (CDT)
- ZIP code: 70084
- Area code: 985

Reserve is an unincorporated community in St. John the Baptist Parish, Louisiana, United States. It is located on the east bank of the Mississippi River. As of the 2020 census, Reserve had a population of 8,541. For statistical purposes, the United States Census Bureau has defined Reserve as a census-designated place (CDP).

== History ==
Prior to the name Reserve, this town was called Bonnet Carre; the town name had been changed by businessman and resident Leon Godchaux by the late 1800s. The Godchaux–Reserve Plantation was built by Godchaux, and the oldest portion of the plantation home dates to 1764, is listed on the National Register of Historic Places (NRHP). In the early 20th century, the plantation at Reserve had the largest sugarcane refinery in the United States, named Godchaux Sugar Refinery.

President William Howard Taft visited Reserve and the Godchaux–Reserve Plantation in 1909. President Gerald Ford visited Reserve on September 25, 1976.

In addition, in 2005 Our Lady of Grace Church, which dates back to 1937, is listed on the National Register of Historic Places.

=== Pontchartrain Works ===
In 2015, the United States Environmental Protection Agency reported findings of the existence of an extremely high risk of cancer in the region and noted that Reserve was the epicenter of the area known as cancer alley. The agency identified releases of the chemical compound chloroprene as responsible for the high risk.

This chemical compound was being released from the Pontchartrain Works facility, a manufacturing facility owned and operated for decades by DuPont and sold in 2015 to Denka of Japan. The facility is the only producer of the chemical in the United States.

== Geography ==
Reserve is located at 30°3′45″N 90°33′12″W (30.062566, -90.553296).

According to the United States Census Bureau, the CDP has a total area of 17.1 square miles (44.3 km^{2}), of which 16.1 square miles (41.6 km^{2}) is land and 1.0 square mile (2.7 km^{2}) (6.13%) is water.

=== Climate ===
Climate data for Reserve, Louisiana (1991–2020)
Month	Jan	Feb	Mar	Apr	May	Jun	Jul	Aug	Sep	Oct	Nov	Dec	Year
Mean daily maximum °F (°C)	62.3 (16.8)	66.7 (19.3)	72.4 (22.4)	78.8 (26.0)	84.9 (29.4)	89.3 (31.8)	91.6 (33.1)	91.6 (33.1)	88.3 (31.3)	81.1 (27.3)	71.2 (21.8)	64.7 (18.2)	78.6 (25.9)
Daily mean °F (°C)	52.6 (11.4)	56.7 (13.7)	62.2 (16.8)	68.5 (20.3)	75.5 (24.2)	80.9 (27.2)	83.2 (28.4)	83.2 (28.4)	79.7 (26.5)	71.0 (21.7)	60.9 (16.1)	55.1 (12.8)	69.1 (20.6)
Mean daily minimum °F (°C)	42.9 (6.1)	46.6 (8.1)	52.1 (11.2)	58.3 (14.6)	66.2 (19.0)	72.6 (22.6)	74.7 (23.7)	74.7 (23.7)	71.0 (21.7)	60.8 (16.0)	50.6 (10.3)	45.5 (7.5)	59.7 (15.4)
Average precipitation inches (mm)	5.89 (150)	4.44 (113)	4.90 (124)	5.54 (141)	5.85 (149)	8.62 (219)	7.08 (180)	5.74 (146)	5.75 (146)	4.14 (105)	4.28 (109)	4.98 (126)	67.21 (1,708)
Average snowfall inches (cm)	0.0 (0.0)	0.0 (0.0)	0.0 (0.0)	0.0 (0.0)	0.0 (0.0)	0.0 (0.0)	0.0 (0.0)	0.0 (0.0)	0.0 (0.0)	0.0 (0.0)	0.0 (0.0)	0.0 (0.0)	0 (0)
Source: NOAA

== Demographics ==
Historical population
Census	Pop.	Note	%±
1950	4,465		—
1960	5,297		18.6%
1970	6,381		20.5%
1980	7,288		14.2%
1990	8,847		21.4%
2000	9,111		3.0%
2010	9,766		7.2%
2020	8,541		−12.5%
U.S. Decennial Census; 1950 1960 1970 1980; 1990 2000 2010

Reserve was first listed as an unincorporated place in the 1950 U.S. census; and then as a census designated place in the 1980 U.S. census.

Reserve CDP, Louisiana – Racial and ethnic composition Note: the US census treats Hispanic/Latino as an ethnic category. This table excludes Latinos from the racial categories and assigns them to a separate category. Hispanics/Latinos may be of any race.
Race / Ethnicity (NH = Non-Hispanic)	Pop 2000	Pop 2010	Pop 2020	% 2000	% 2010	% 2020
White alone (NH)	3,923	3,559	2,806	43.06%	36.44%	32.85%
Black or African American alone (NH)	4,909	5,772	5,011	53.88%	59.10%	58.67%
Native American or Alaska Native alone (NH)	16	18	26	0.18%	0.18%	0.30%
Asian alone (NH)	29	38	29	0.32%	0.39%	0.34%
Native Hawaiian or Pacific Islander alone (NH)	2	4	2	0.02%	0.04%	0.02%
Other race alone (NH)	1	7	10	0.01%	0.07%	0.12%
Mixed race or Multiracial (NH)	51	88	165	0.56%	0.90%	1.93%
Hispanic or Latino (any race)	180	280	492	1.98%	2.87%	5.76%
Total	9,111	9,766	8,541	100.00%	100.00%	100.00%

As of the 2020 United States census, there were 8,541 people, 3,232 households, and 2,246 families residing in the CDP. As of the census of 2000, there were 9,111 people, 3,068 households, and 2,347 families residing in the CDP. The population density was 567.1 inhabitants per square mile (219.0/km^{2}). There were 3,385 housing units at an average density of 210.7 per square mile (81.4/km^{2}). The racial makeup of the CDP was 44.17% White, 53.92% African American, 0.19% Native American, 0.32% Asian, 0.02% Pacific Islander, 0.60% from other races, and 0.78% from two or more races. Hispanic or Latino of any race were 1.98% of the population.

There were 3,068 households, out of which 41.5% had children under the age of 18 living with them, 48.6% were married couples living together, 22.2% had a female householder with no husband present, and 23.5% were non-families. 20.8% of all households were made up of individuals, and 8.1% had someone living alone who was 65 years of age or older. The average household size was 2.97 and the average family size was 3.45.

In the CDP, the population was spread out, with 32.2% under the age of 18, 10.4% from 18 to 24, 28.6% from 25 to 44, 19.3% from 45 to 64, and 9.5% who were 65 years of age or older. The median age was 31 years. For every 100 females, there were 90.9 males. For every 100 females age 18 and over, there were 85.1 males.

The median income for a household in the CDP was $32,466, and the median income for a family was $40,191. Males had a median income of $33,297 versus $19,671 for females. The per capita income for the CDP was $13,373. About 18.4% of families and 21.5% of the population were below the poverty line, including 30.8% of those under age 18 and 15.0% of those age 65 or over.

== Education ==
The St. John the Baptist Parish School Board, which covers the entire parish, operates public schools in the community.

- East St. John Preparatory Academy (formerly East St. John Elementary School) (Reserve CDP, LaPlace postal address) - The Times-Picayune describes the school as being in LaPlace. It had a fire in 2015, and its 65,000-square-foot (6,000 m^{2}) replacement facility opened in 2018. It became a 5-8 school only in 2017. In 2025, East St. John Preparatory School is to be renamed Fifth Ward Preparatory School, as the former Fifth Ward Elementary School will close that year.
- Fifth Ward Elementary School
  - Historically the institution was a segregated school for African-American students. Previously the facility was a junior high school. In 2024, most of the students were African-American. It is adjacent to a chemical plant owned by Denka Performance Elastomer. It is scheduled to close in 2025, and East St. John Preparatory School in turn is to be renamed Fifth Ward Preparatory School.

In 2008, two K–8 schools served separate areas that have Reserve addresses: Prior to 2017, the following schools had attendance boundaries including sections of the Reserve CDP: 5th Ward, East St. John, and Emily C. Watkins elementary schools (Watkins is in LaPlace CDP).

High schools:

- East St. John High School in Reserve serves the community.

Private schools:

- Riverside Academy is a small private school in Reserve.

St. Peter Catholic School of the Roman Catholic Archdiocese of New Orleans is a K–7 Catholic school. Our Lady of Grace School was a Catholic K–7 school in Reserve. It closed in 2015; it had 171 students remaining, with about 51 having taken advantage of a Louisiana school voucher regime. There were two graduating classes in 2015.

== Notable people ==
- Jared Butler (born 2000), basketball player
- Tweety Carter (born 1986), basketball player
- Rico Gathers (born 1994), football player
- Edmond Hall (1901–1967), jazz clarinetist and bandleader
- Herb Hall (1907–1996), jazz clarinetist
- Patrick Lewis (born 1991), football player
- Ryan Perrilloux (born 1987), football player
- Jahkeem Stewart (born 2007), football player
- Kid Thomas Valentine (1896–1987), trumpeter and bandleader
