= St. James Church (Stratford, Connecticut) =

Coordinates: 41.1883914°N 73.1304312°W

- St. James Church
- Location: 2110 Main Street; Stratford, Connecticut
- Country: United States
- Denomination: Roman Catholic

Architecture
- Architect(s): J. Gerald Phelan original building Andrew G. Patrick redesign

Administration
- Province: Hartford
- Diocese: Bridgeport

Clergy
- Bishop: Most Rev. [Frank Caggiano]

St. James is a Roman Catholic church in Stratford, Connecticut, part of the Diocese of Bridgeport.

== History ==
The Gothic Revival church was designed by J. Gerald Phelan and later redesigned by Andrew G. Patrick.

== The Peragallo Organ ==
The organ was designed by the Peragallo Organ Company of Paterson, NJ, Opus 672. It is a 3 manual and pedal instrument containing 8 ranks of pipework with a total of 415 speaking pipes augmented with 47 digitally sampled ranks for a total of 55 ranks.
