= Our Lady of the Assumption Church (Westport, Connecticut) =

Coordinates: 41°08′10.28″N 73°21′53.09″W

Our Lady of the Assumption Parish
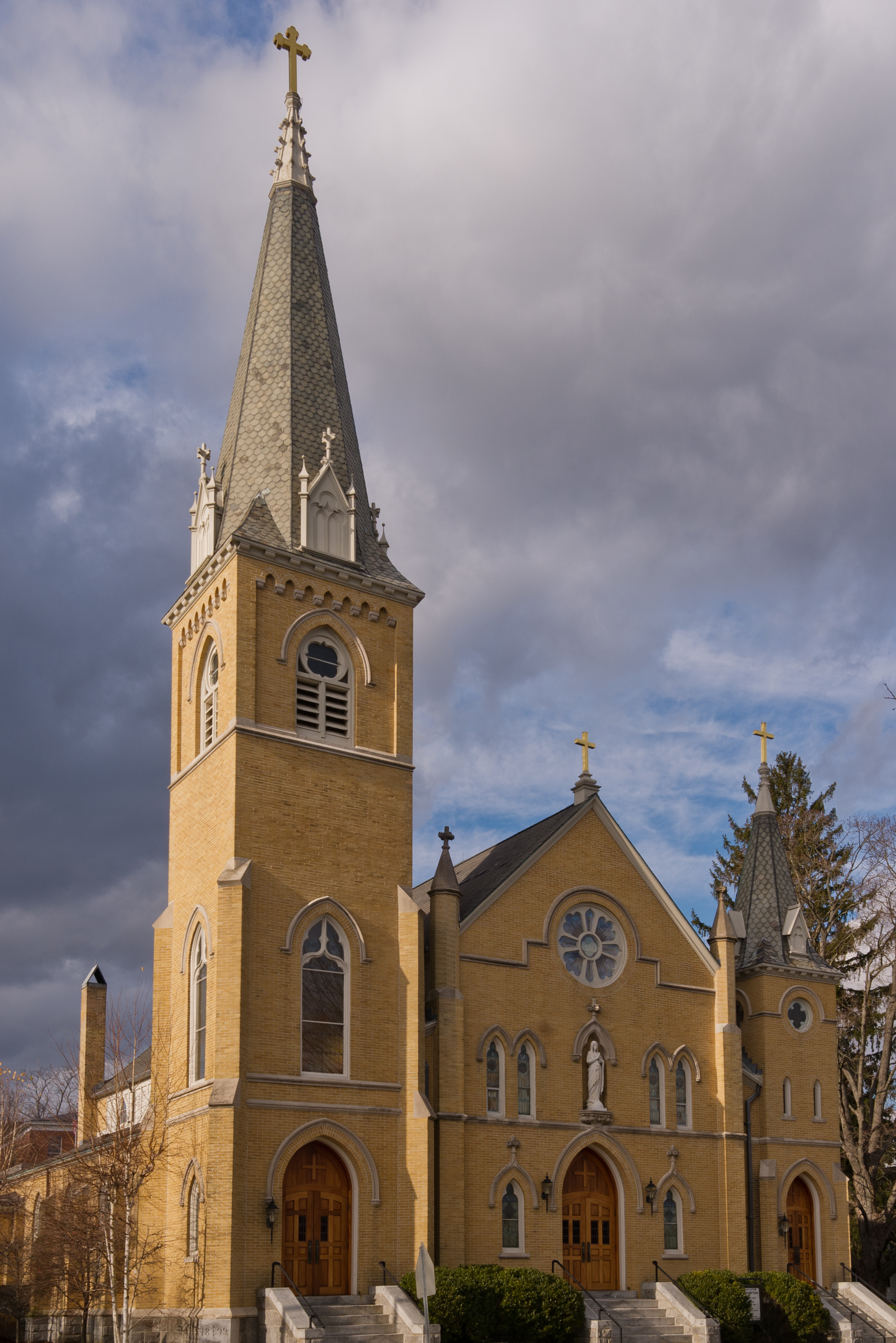
- Our Lady of the Assumption Parish, Westport Connecticut
- Our Lady of the Assumption Parish
- Location: 98 Riverside Avenue; Westport, Connecticut
- Country: United States
- Denomination: Roman Catholic

Architecture
- Architect: Oliver Reagan renovation - 1940s

Administration
- Province: Hartford
- Diocese: Bridgeport

Clergy
- Bishop: Most Rev. Frank Joseph Caggiano

Our Lady of the Assumption Church is a Roman Catholic church in Westport, Connecticut, part of the Diocese of Bridgeport.

== History ==
The first recorded Mass celebrated in Westport was said in 1853 by Rev. John Brady of Norwalk, in the Universalist Church on Main Street. For many years Westport was a mission of St. Mary's Church in Norwalk. A church built by Rev. Dr. Mulligan was dedicated on August 15, 1860. In 1876, Rev. M.P. Lawlor was made pastor in Fairfield, with responsibility for Westport as well.
