= Our Lady of the Assumption Church, Novocherkassk =

Coordinates: 47.4160°N 40.0878°E

Our Lady of the Assumption Church
- Храм Успения Пресвятой Богородицы
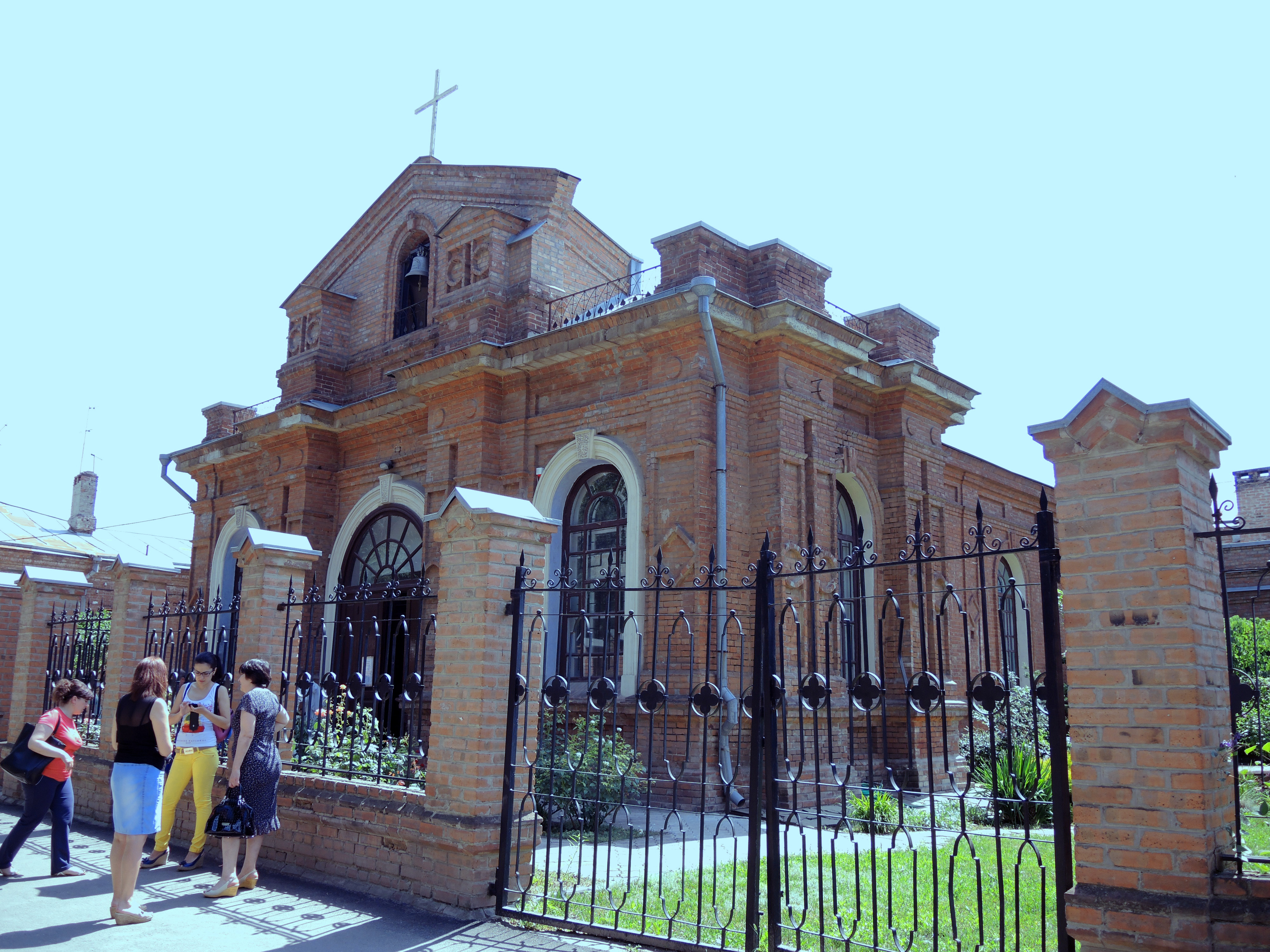
- Our Lady of the Assumption Church
- Location: Novocherkassk
- Country: Russia
- Denomination: Roman Catholic Church

The Our Lady of the Assumption Church (Russian: Храм Успения Пресвятой Богородицы) is a Catholic church in the city of Novocherkassk in Russia. It depends on the deanship of Rostov in the Diocese of Saint Clement at Saratov.

This church dedicated to the Assumption of the Virgin was built with the design of the Polish architect Bronisław Brochwicz-Rogoyski (1861-1921) in 1902 by the Polish community deported there after the Polish uprising of 1861-1864. It replaced an older church built in the second half of the nineteenth century. The church also served Catholic Armenians living in the area since the eighteenth century, and a few families of Don Germans.

The church was completed in 1906. The parish had 4,231 parishioners in 1917. Closed during the time of the Soviet Union, Father Johann Lang, continued his hidden pastoral work with his parishioners until he was deported in 1941. He died in the Gulag in 1944.

As normal relations resumed between the State and the various Christian denominations in the 1990s, the Catholic parish of Novocherkassk register established in 1993 and the church recovered in 1994.

== Gallery ==
Exterior

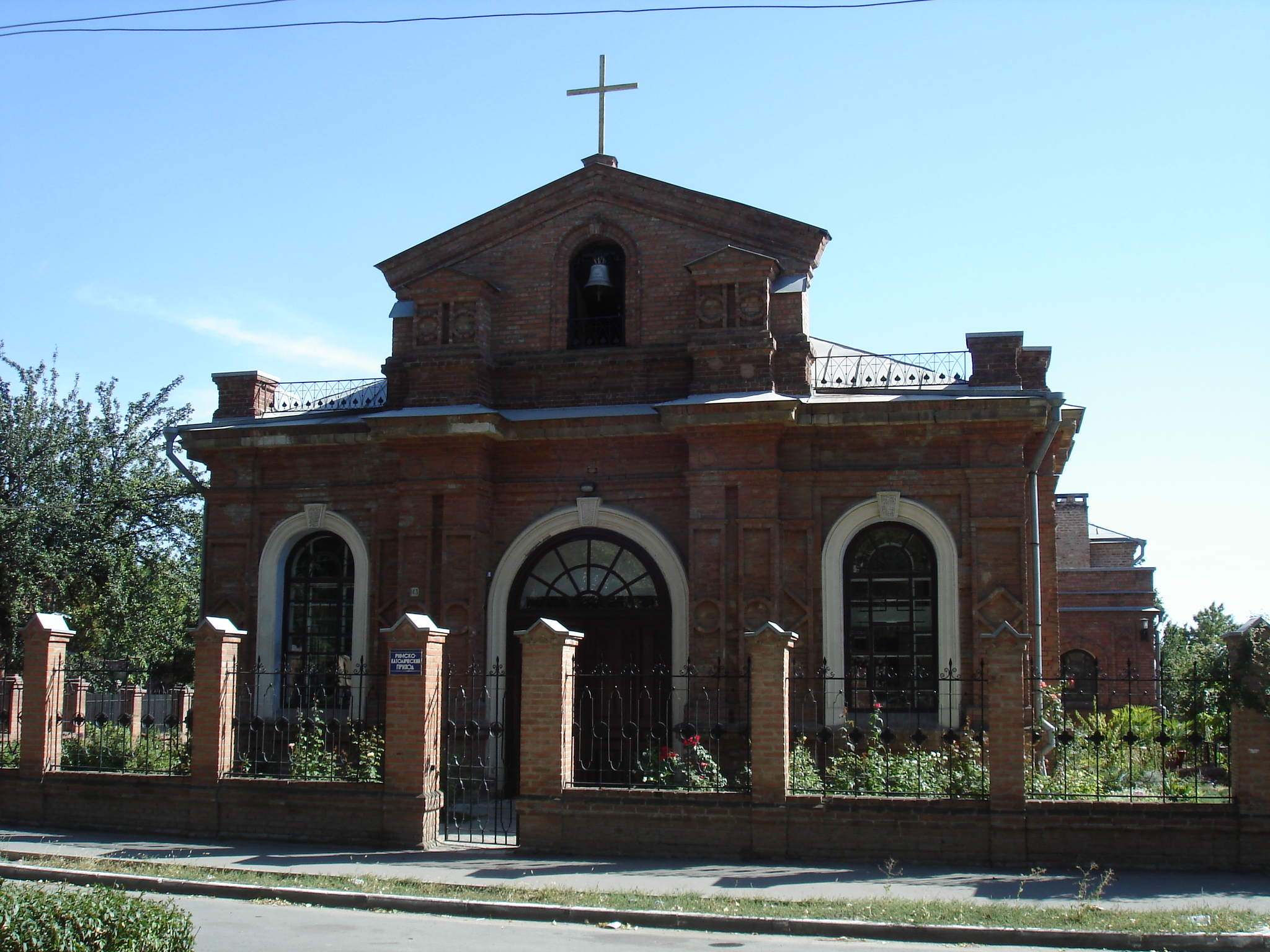

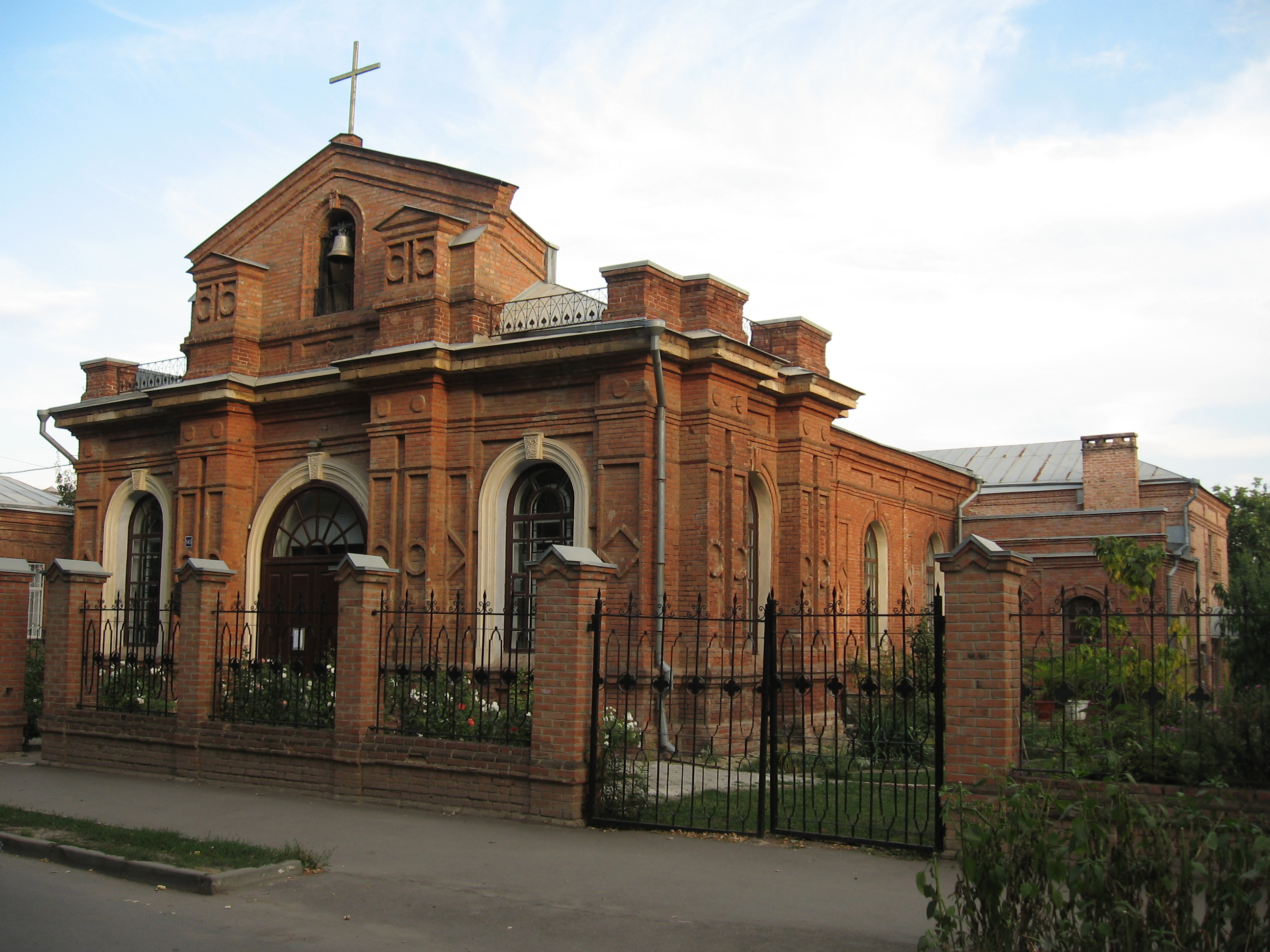

Interior

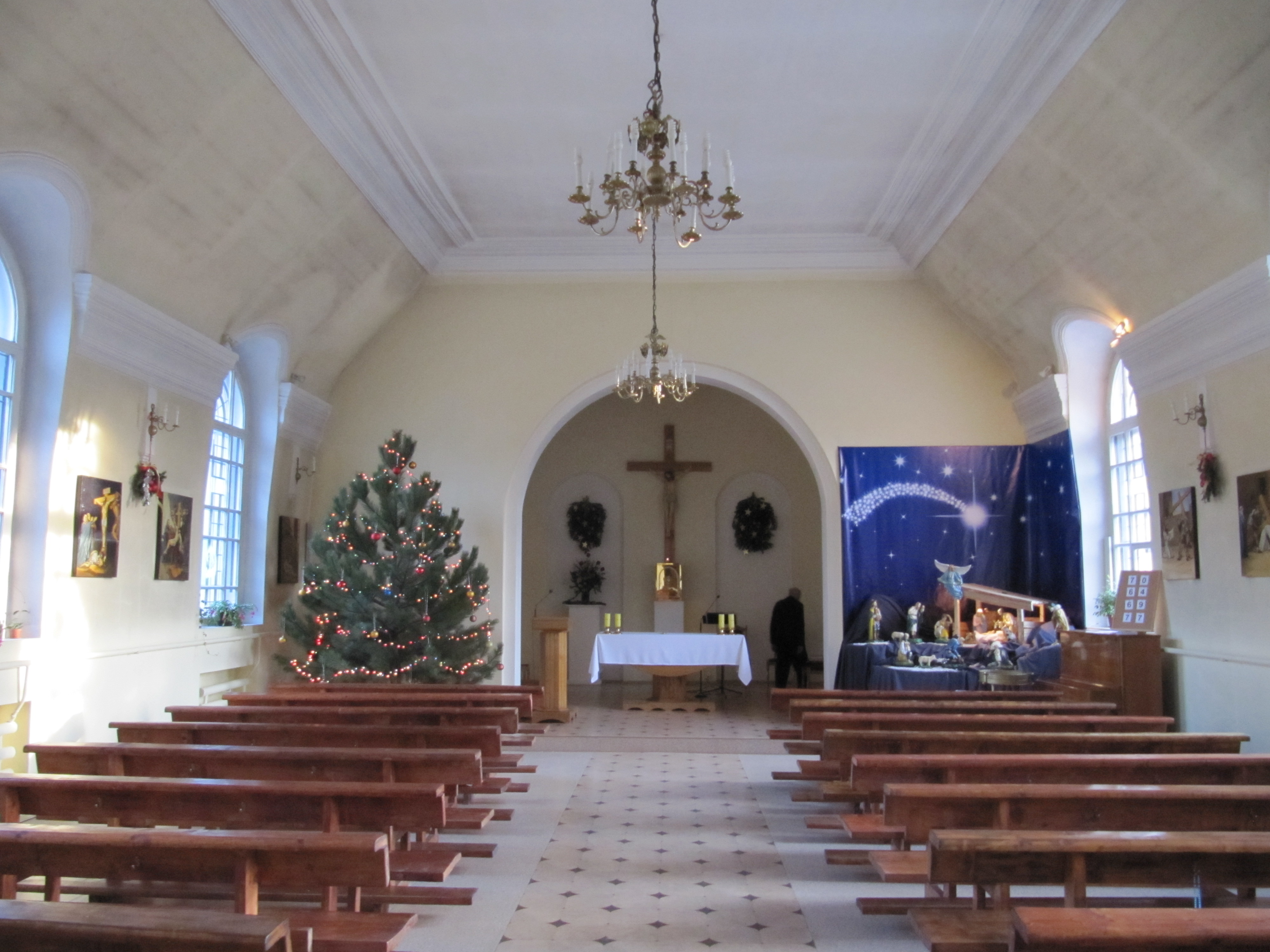

== See also ==
- Roman Catholicism in Russia
- Our Lady of the Assumption
