= Church of Our Lady of the Assumption, Kursk =

Coordinates: 51.7322°N 36.1877°E

Church of Our Lady of the Assumption
- Храм Успения Богородицы
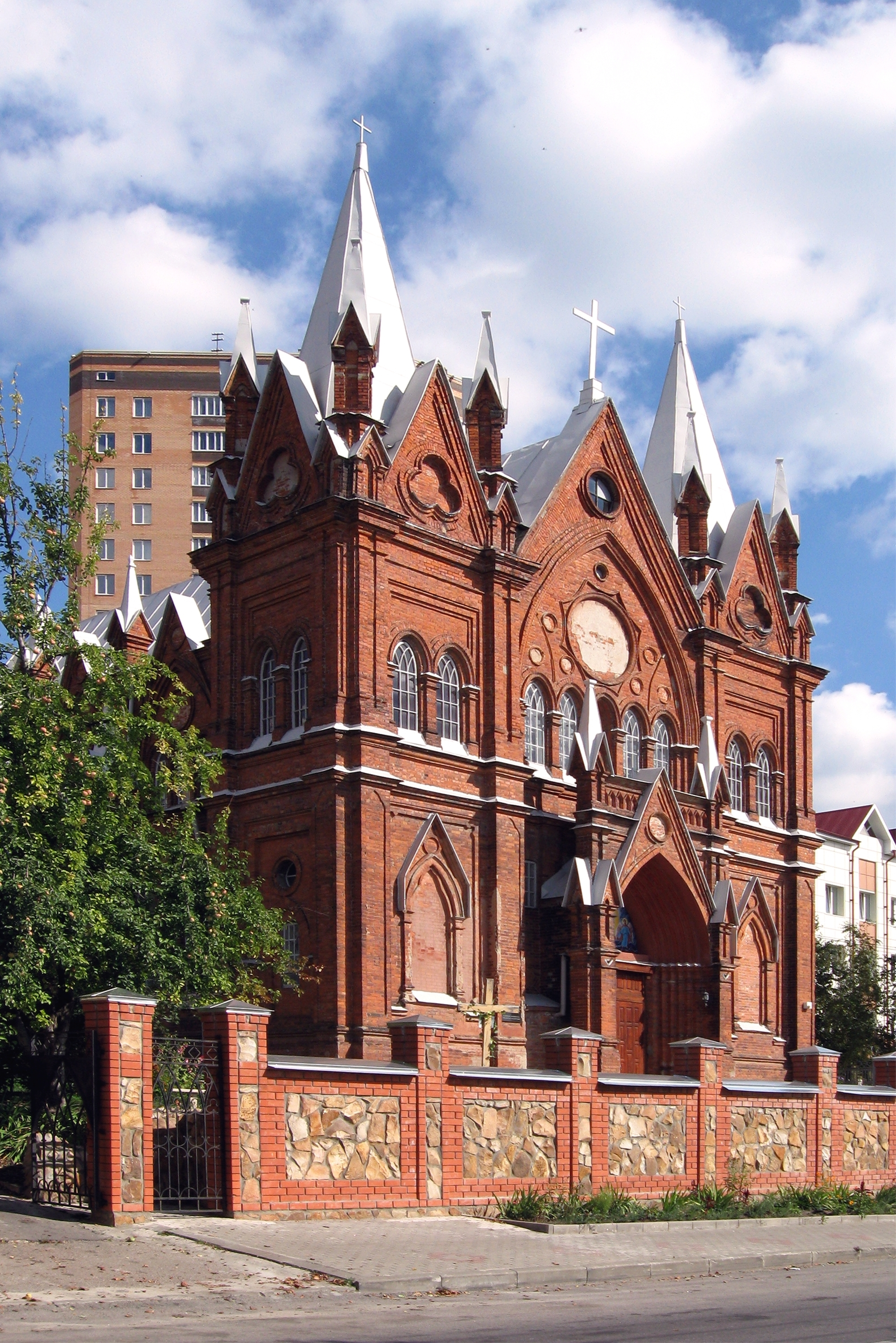
- Church of Our Lady of the Assumption
- Location: Kursk
- Country: Russia
- Denomination: Roman Catholic Church

The Church of Our Lady of the Assumption (Russian: Храм Успения Богородицы) It is a Latin Rite Catholic Church located in the city of Kursk, in the Archdiocese of European Russia, headquartered in Moscow (and whose archbishop is Monsignor Paolo Pezzi).

In 1859 the Catholic community of Kursk, most Polish or German origin, with more than a thousand faithful, asked permission to build a church. They previously met in a chapel. Once the funds were raised, it was granted permission and the church was begun in 1892 in neo-Gothic style. The church was under the patronage of Our Lady of the Assumption and was consecrated in 1896. It originally consisted of two towers at the ends of the facade and was built in red brick. The interior was decorated with beautiful mosaics.

The church was returned to the diocese its 110th anniversary in 2006 was celebrated in 1997.

== See also ==
- Roman Catholicism in Russia
- Our Lady of the Assumption
