= St. Pius X Church (Fairfield, Connecticut) =

Coordinates: 41°09′32.21″N 73°15′29.55″W

- St. Pius X Church
- Location: 834 Brookside Drive; Fairfield, Connecticut
- Country: United States
- Denomination: Roman Catholic

History
- Founded: October 25, 1955
- Founder: Lawrence Cardinal Sheehan

Architecture
- Architect: J. Gerald Phelan

Administration
- Province: Hartford
- Diocese: Bridgeport

Clergy
- Bishop: The Most Rev’d Frank Caggiano
- Pastor: The Rev’d Samuel S. Kachuba

St. Pius X is a Roman Catholic church in Fairfield, Connecticut in the Diocese of Bridgeport. The present Colonial-style church was designed by J. Gerald Phelan.
