= Our Lady of the Assumption Church (Fairfield, Connecticut) =

Coordinates: 41°11′34.08″N 73°13′38.47″W

- Our Lady of the Assumption Church
- Location: 545 Stratfield Road; Fairfield, Connecticut
- Country: United States
- Denomination: Roman Catholic

Architecture
- Architect: J. Gerald Phelan

Administration
- Province: Hartford
- Diocese: Bridgeport

Clergy
- Bishop: Most Rev. William E. Lori

Our Lady of the Assumption is a Roman Catholic church in Fairfield, Connecticut, part of the Diocese of Bridgeport.

== History ==
The Parish was founded in 1922. The present Norman Gothic Revival church was designed and erected between 1939 and 1940 by noted church architect J. Gerald Phelan.

The Assumption Parish hosts SeptemberFest annually.

The church building partly burned in 2021, but firefighters saved the structure.
