= Church of Our Lady of the Assumption, Villamelendro de Valdavia =

Catholic church in Spain

Church of Our Lady of the Assumption
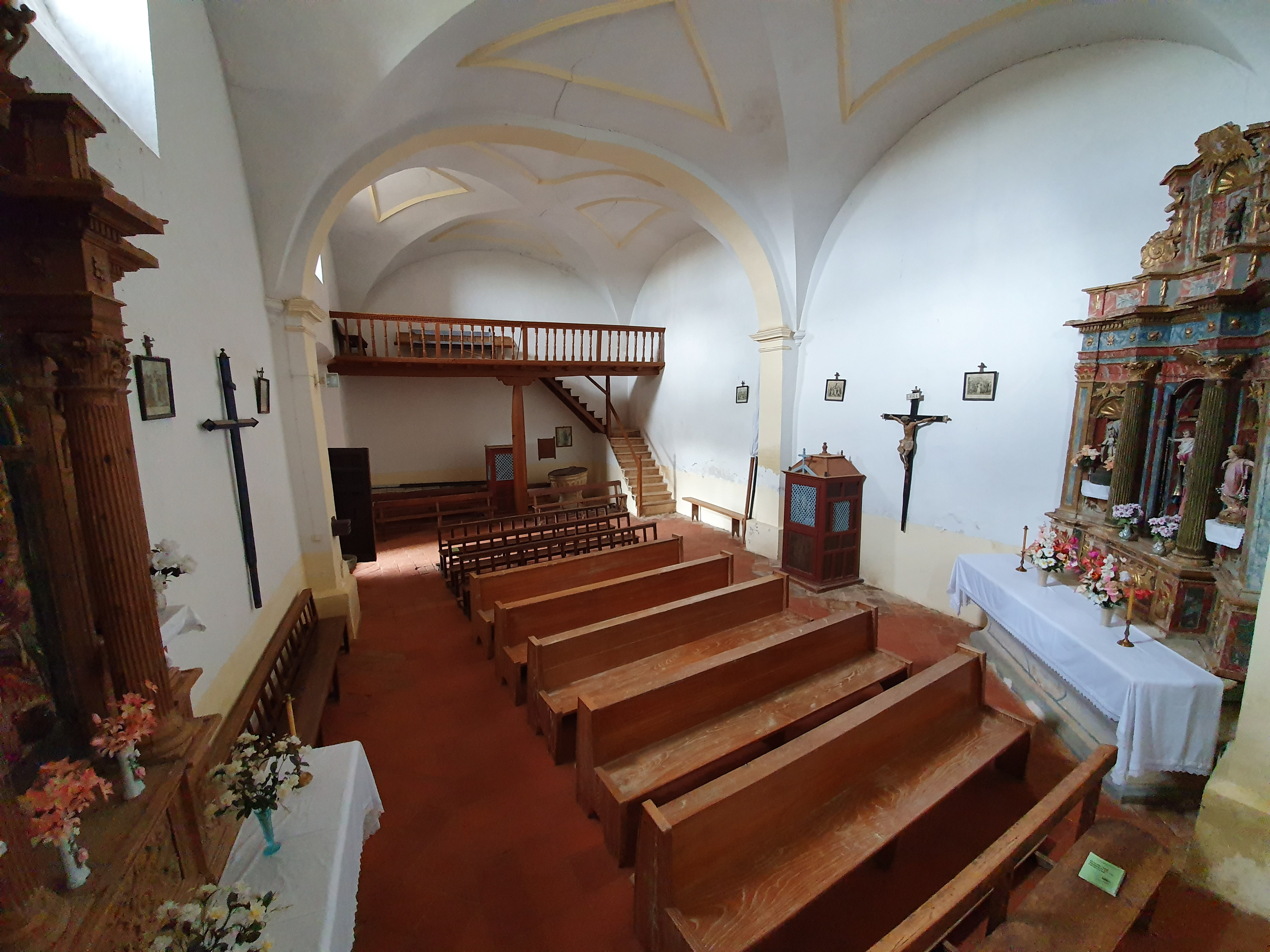
- Interior
- Church of Our Lady of the Assumption
- 42.53833°N 4.57564°W
- Location: Villamelendro de Valdavia
- Country: Spain
- Denomination: Catholic Church
- Sui iuris church: Latin Church

History
- Status: Active
- Dedication: Assumption of Mary and Saint Rocco

Architecture
- Functional status: Parish church
- Architect: Juan de la Cuesta
- Style: Baroque architecture

Administration
- Diocese: Palencia

The Church of Our Lady of the Assumption (Spanish: la iglesia de Nuestra Señora de la Asunción), is a Catholic church located in Villamelendro de Valdavia, Spain. Originally built in the early twelfth century, the church's architecture is designed in a baroque style.

== History ==
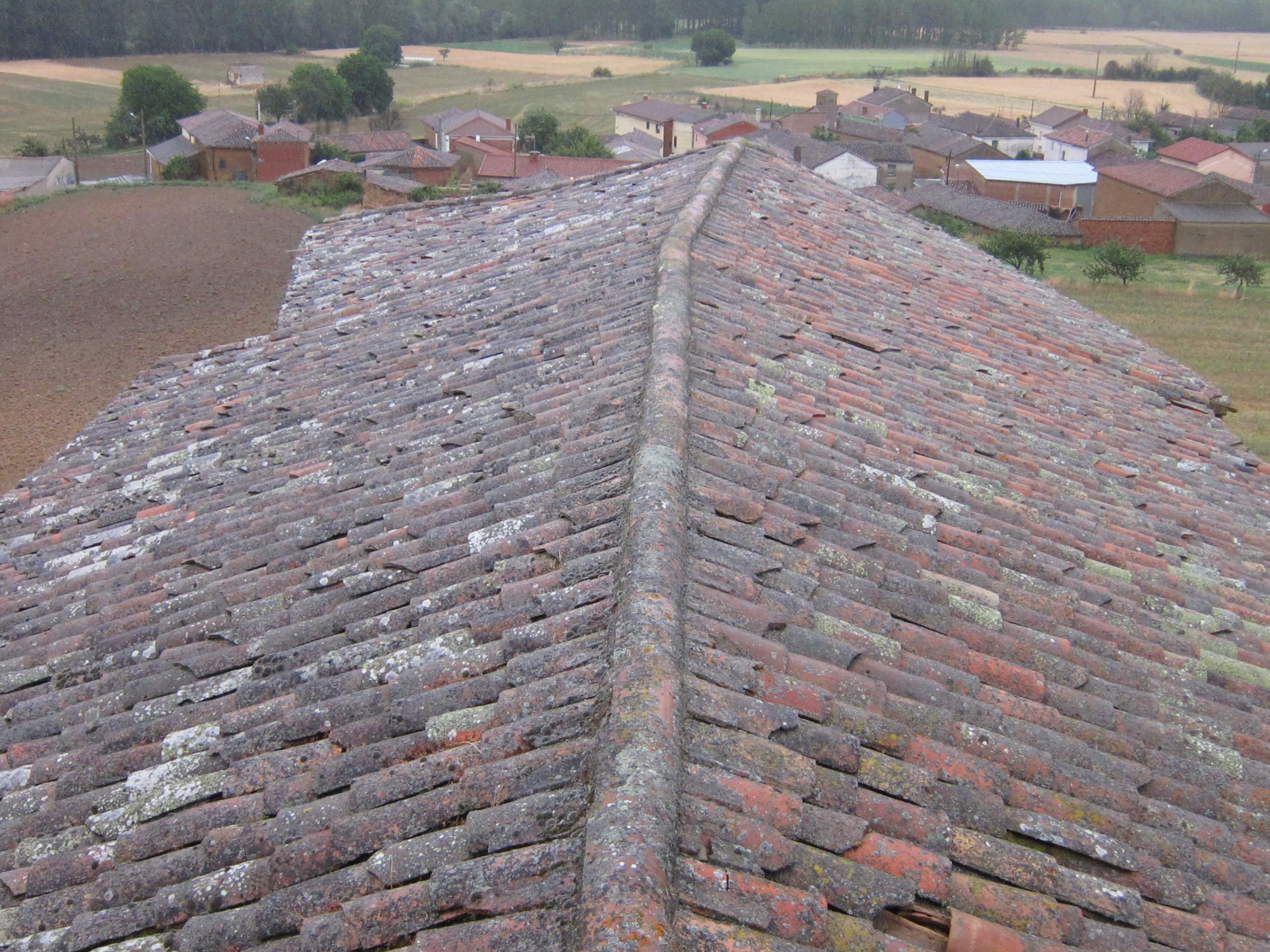
Roof of the church. The axis of the presbytery is different from that of the rest of the nave. As it was where mass was celebrated and therefore the most sacred area, and also closer to the urban centre, it can be deduced that it could be the oldest part, from which Juan de la Cuesta enlarged the rest of the building

Evidence of the church dates back to the twelfth century. After the priests of their parishes of Villasila and Villamelendro travelled to Carrión to plead their case, Alfonso VIII recognised the existence of their respective communities in 1180. The church in Villamelendro was built on top of an older, more primitive construction; in fact, two structure is aligned on two separate axes of symmetry. The presbytery presents a slightly different alignment from the rest of the nave. Given that it is closer to the village, it can be deduced that the presbytery is the oldest part, around which the rest of the building constructed.

Documentation form a 1549 pastoral visit to the church detail the construction works that were being carried out at the time. According to the 1549 record, the bulk of the current church building's structure is accredited to Juan de la Cuesta, a Cantabrian master stonemason. It is also known that during these works, Juan de la Cuesta collaborated with Pedro de Argadero, a neighbor of Carrión de los Condes, who was responsible for making the wooden structure over the vaults on which the roof rests. Later additions to the building, including the portico and its paving, as well as the later remodeling of the buttresses and sacristy, seem to be works that took place after Juan de la Cuesta's construction.

In 1771, Manuel Jacinto de Bringas, mayor of the province of Toro, created a file for the Count of Aranda detailing the state of the congregations, confraternities, and brotherhoods in the towns within his jurisdiction. Villasila and Villamelendro are included in this report, with four Brotherhoods, six Guardianships and 6493 reales budgeted for sacred events and celebrations.

Oral tradition alleges that in the 1970s, during the excavation of a well in the corner of the land near the sacristy, a tombstone with characters was uncovered, the location of which, is today unknown.

Until the end of the 1980s, men traditionally sat in the choir, in the pews below the choir (where a still-existing indigo blue and black bench, known as the pew of darkness, stood out) and the area closest to the entrance, while women sat in kneeling pews closest to the presbytery. These kneeling places were usually above the areas where their relatives were buried, and the place where the women of the same family sat was maintained from generation to generation.

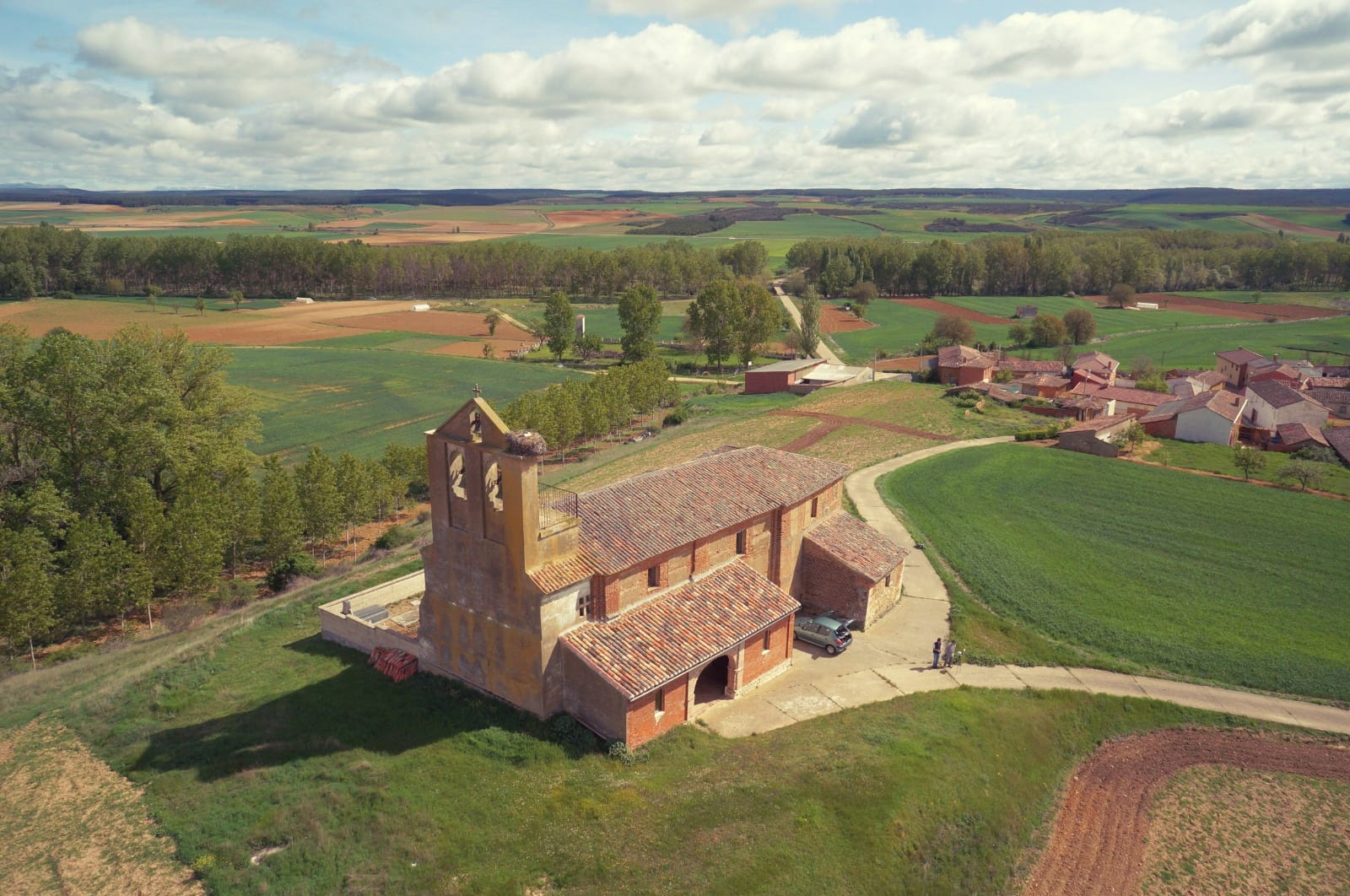
Aerial view of the church.

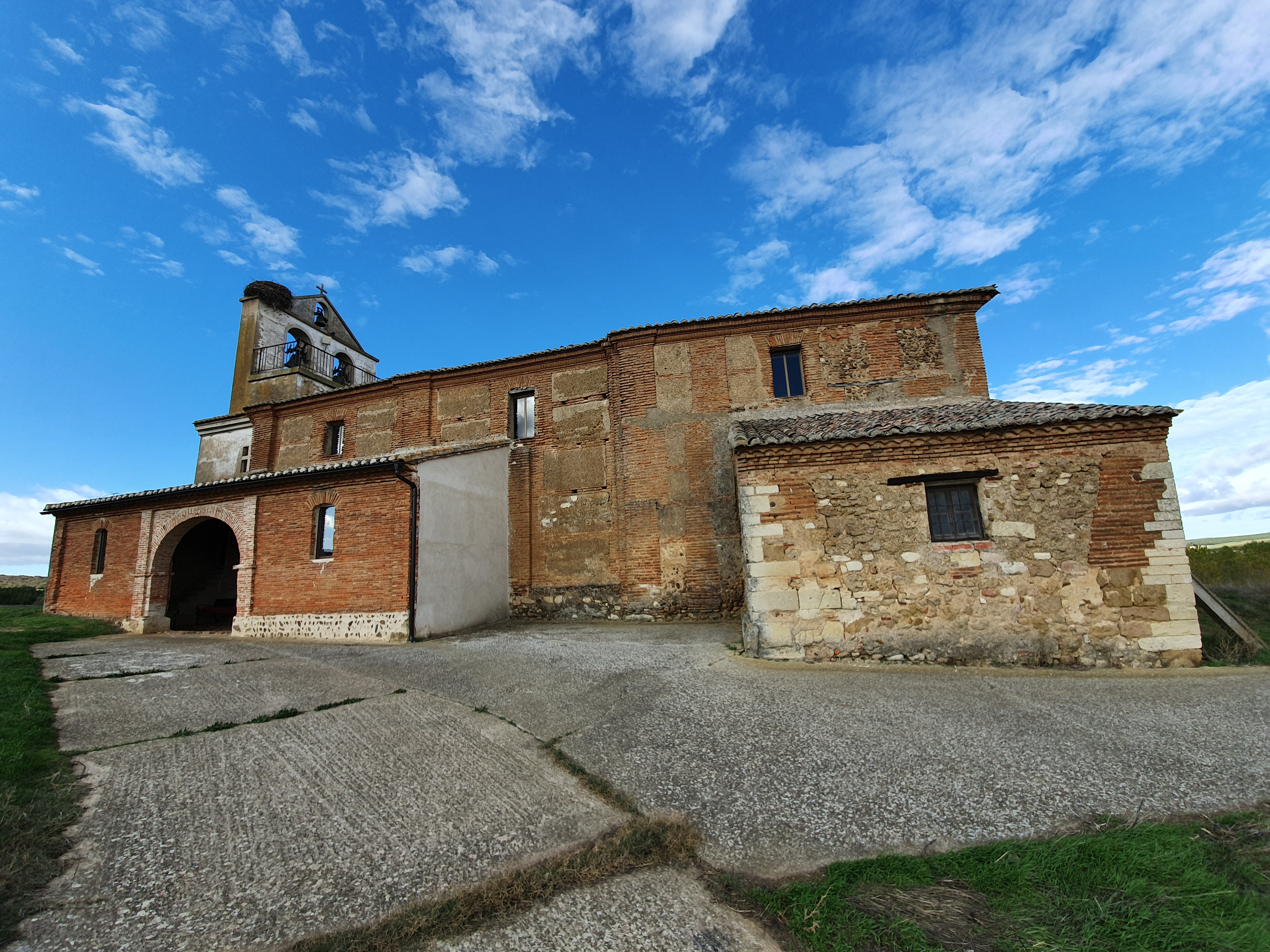
Front facade of the church.

Floor plan of the church showing the church porch (atrio), nave, Presbytery, and sacristy (sacristía).

== Architecture ==
=== Exterior ===
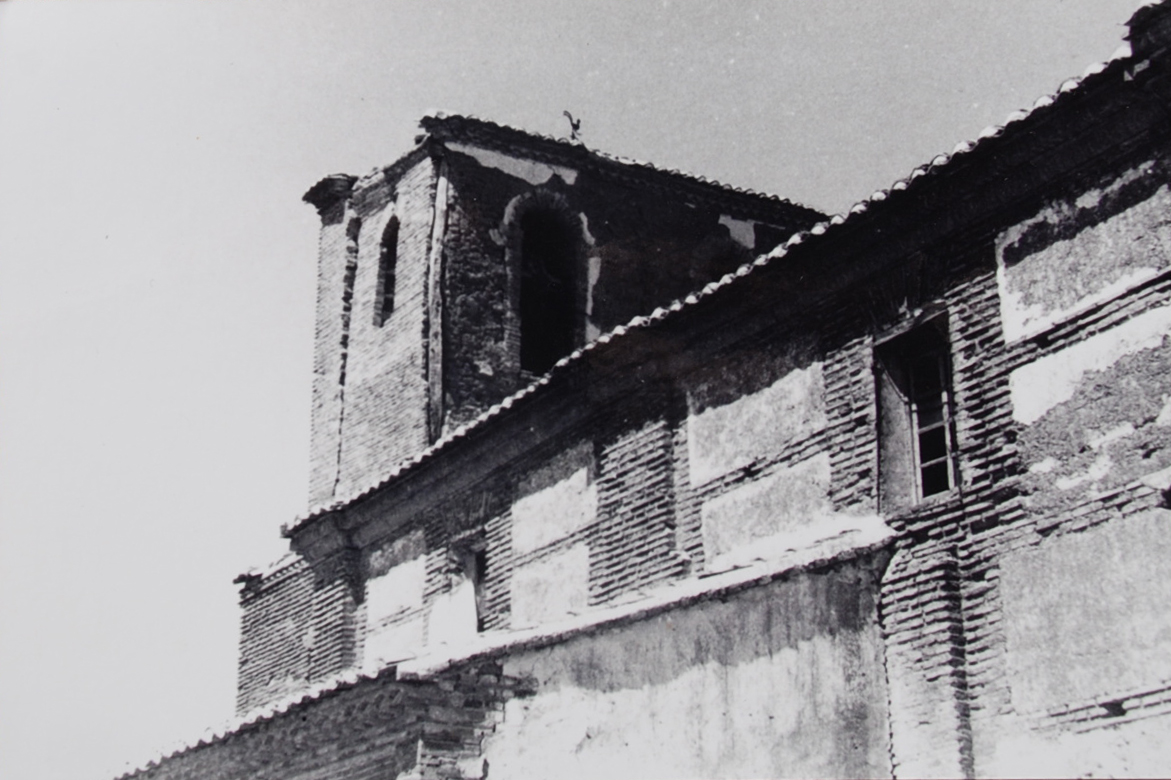
View of the original bell tower before its demolition and eventual reconstruction.

The church is constructed with brick masonry and stonework, with a modern belfry tower at the foot made of plastered brick. It replaced the old masonry and brick tower with a hipped roof and two loopholes in the mid-20th century, as the original had become highly unstable.

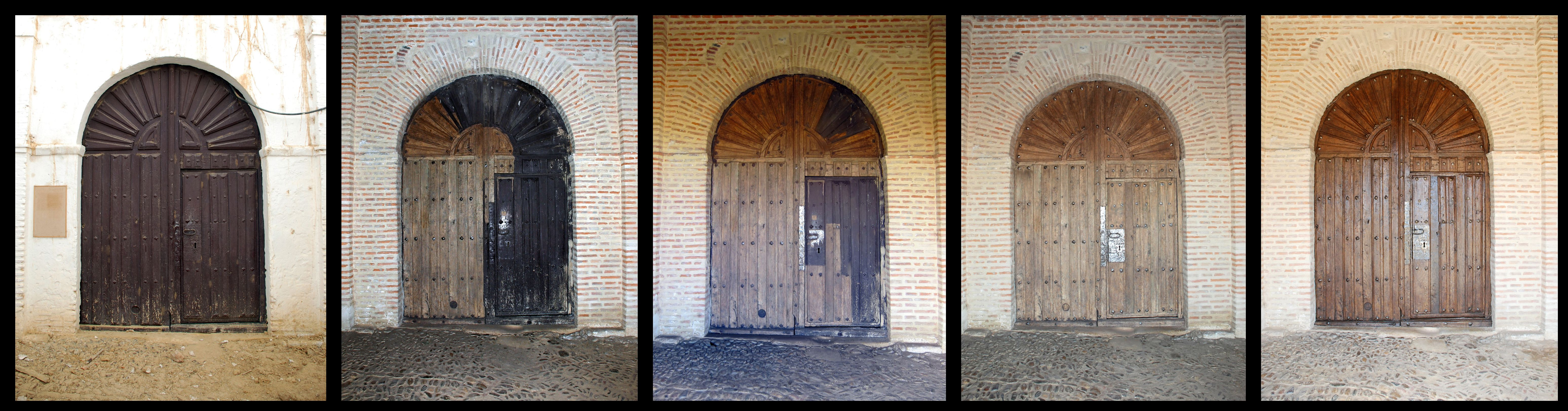
Restoration process of the exterior door of the church.

The interior building is accessed through a church porch on the epistle side of the church. Part of the porch was used as liturgical storage from some time after its erection until its restoration in 2012. The 2012 restoration works were focused on conservation of the porch's roof, cleaning of the interior facade, and replacement of the adobe wall of the eastern enclosure with a thermo-clay wall. When the foundation of the replacement wall was being built, remains of skulls from bodies buried outside the church were found. The exterior door of the porch consists of two large panels, with a smaller door inset for quick access. Although the large panels would have been opened regularly, there were bound together at some point, perhaps to protect the parishioners who congregated in the porch from the cold. The exterior door was restored to its original state of function in 2014. Several layers of paint were removed during the process which had accumulated over the centuries. At least four shades of paint were found: grey, light green, light brown, and finally dark brown. In the process of restoration, two additional pattée crosses were found carved outside the left door. A nail from the El Pobal ironworks in Muskiz was also used, as well as two other restored nails from local constructions that show a four-lobed exterior.

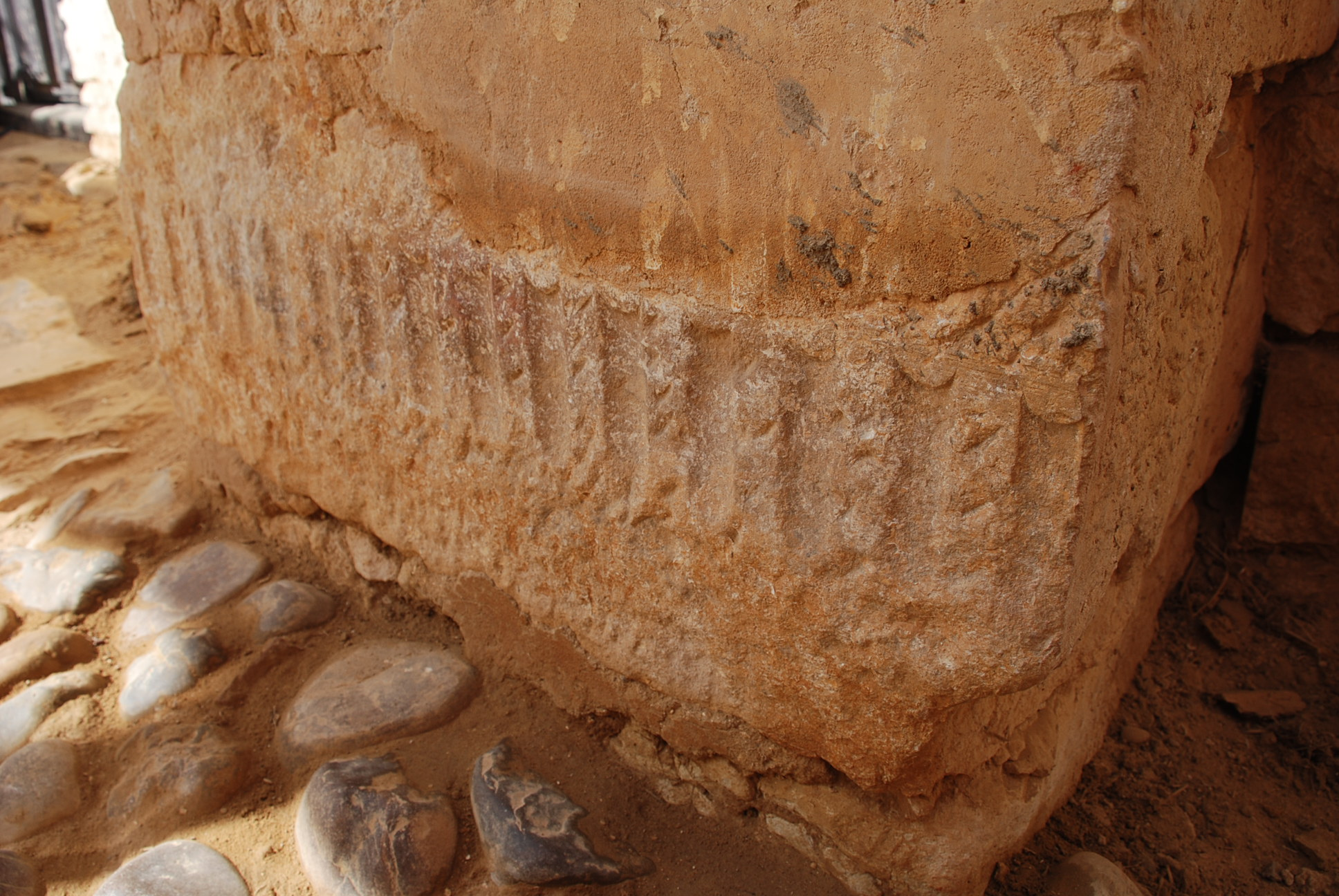
Carved stone recovered from one of the buttresses of the south facade with Renaissance era grooves.

A dimension stone was also uncovered during the renovations, which had been removed from its original location and refitted sometime after the work of Juan de la Cuesta. The stone has a series of grooves that experts at the Monastery of Santa María la Real (Palencia) of Aguilar de Campóo determined was a Renaissance era moulding that had been removed. The grooves, 15 in all, are finished off with a semicircle at the top, and between the grooves there seems to be a kind of rope column decoration.

Outside, there is a relief of a pattée cross on one of the carved stones of the sacristy. This motif of a pattée cross is repeated on several doorways in the Palencia and Burgundy regions, with the cross almost always in the same position to the right of the main door. This custom could be associated with some kind of protective ritual already common within the nineteenth century, probably the 1855 cholera epidemic. Another possibility is that this relief was related to the Brotherhood of the Vera Cruz of Villamelendro. Each parish had at least two confraternities: one was the Vera Cruz confraternity and the other the Animas confraternity, which would explain their presence in other parishes.

On the exterior of the apse, centered near the top, is an eroded brick which local popular tradition calls the santo rojo (literally "holy red") due to the reddish colour of the material from which it was built. This served as a sundial during the summer season, and the shadow of the temple reached this brick during the months of the heat wave, just as it arrived at noon, serving as a reference for the neighbors who were working in the vicinity of the church.

The cemetery is located on the north side of the church. It was likely constructed during the beginning of the 19th century, although the current cemetery is an extension of the original one and has access and walls that were remodeled by the Villasila municipal government at the end of the 20th century.

=== Interior ===
The interior consists of a single nave and presbytery, separated by arches of carved stone in three sections, covered with a barrel vault, and with a raised wooden choir at the rear. In 1987, frescoes dating from the 18th century were discovered. On the gospel side a star motif is repeated on the floor of the church entrance, while on the epistle side there is a figure of an allegorical vase representing the Virgin Mary.

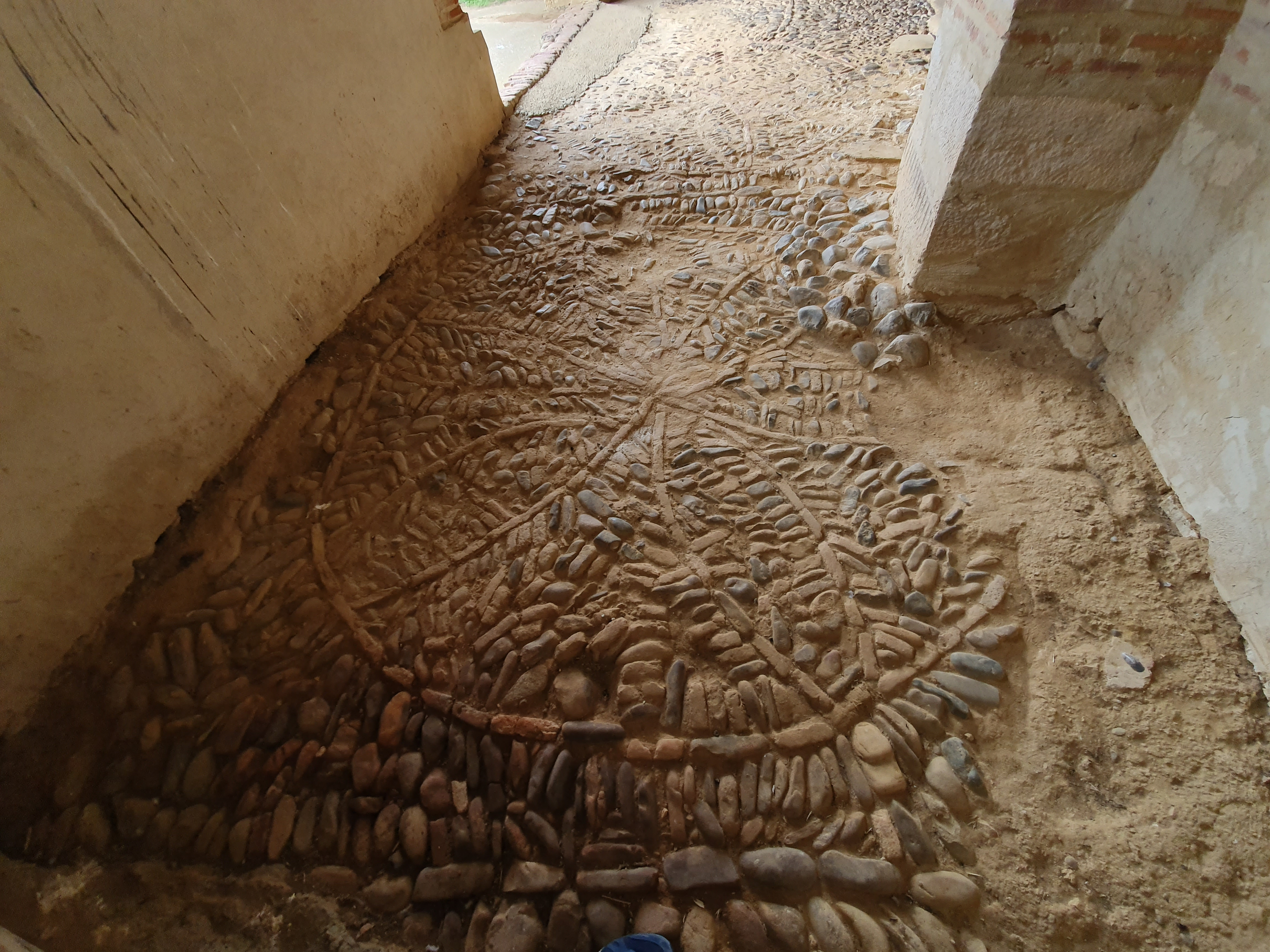
Stone floor revealed by the 2012 renovation.

Repairs to the portico floor during the 2012 renovation revealed that parts of the building are paved with small river rocks which form patterns. A motif created in the floor near the entrance could correspond to a kind of protective sun symbol which was commonly place at the entrance of religious sites during the era of the church's construction.

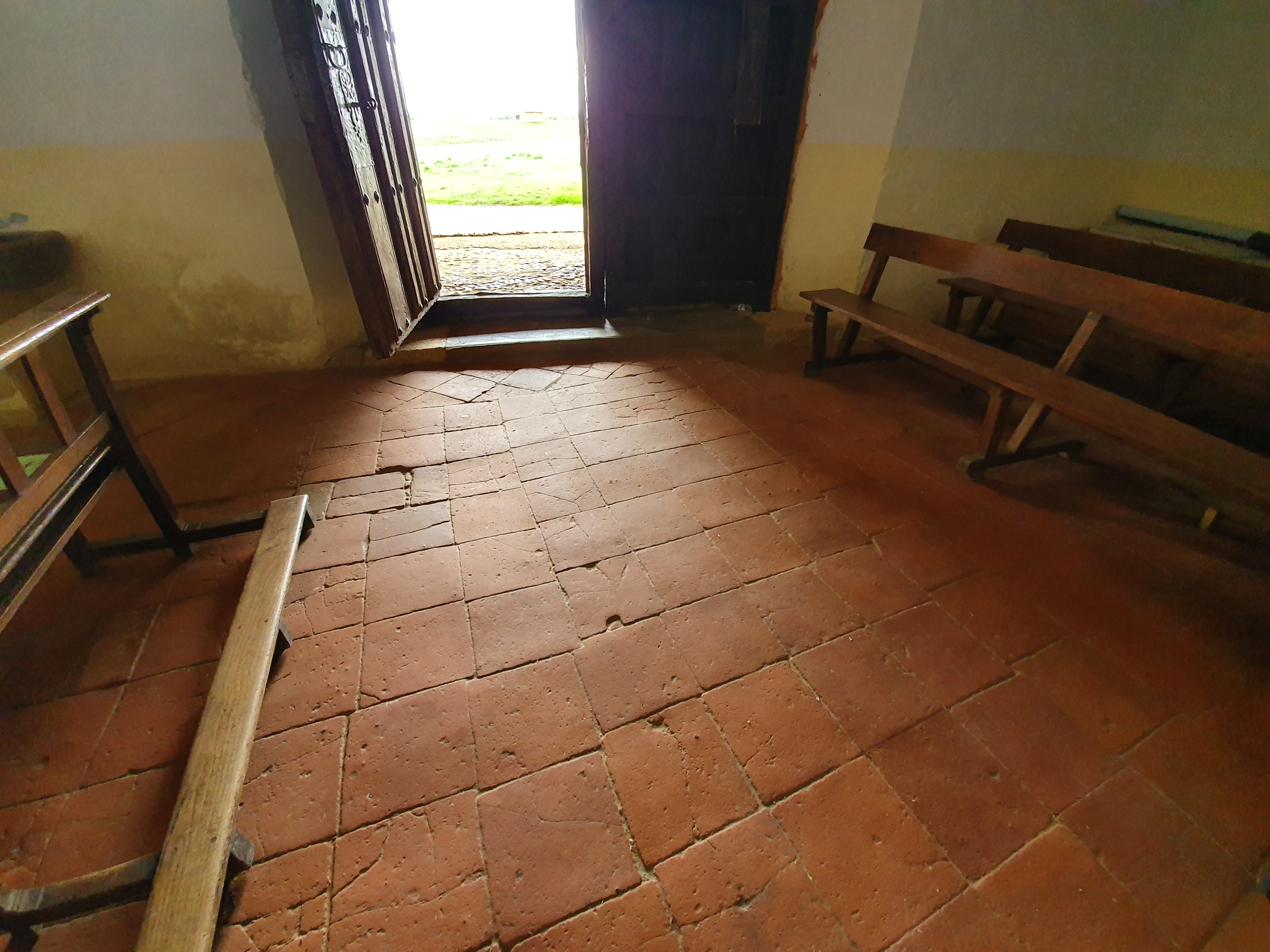
Floor with original terracotta tiles

The original terracotta floor of the main church remains intact and has been preserved. For much of the church's history graves were laid beneath the floor of the church. As a result, many of the tiles are today dented and have chipped edges on their edges as they were lifted and relaid into the floor. Because these burial plots were paid for, wealthier members of the congregation could afford to be buried closer to the altar, while most were buried in areas on the far end of the church. As space ran out beneath the nave of the church, a need for an exterior cemetery became apparent in the 18th century, but interior burials continued until the 19th century.

== Fixtures and decorations ==
On the far end of the presbytery sit the main altarpiece from the first half of the 17th century. The altarpiece displays paintings of the Annunciation and Adoration of the Shepherds, flanked by four small panels representing the Fathers of the Church, from left to right: Augustine of Hippo, Gregory the Great, Ambrose of Milan, and Jerome of Stridon on which four Corinthian Order columns are supported as an allegory for the pillars of the Church. The altarpiece is articulated by a central niche, featuring an image of the ascension which itself is surrounded by four panels depicting the life and martyrdom of Cyricus and Julitta. A crucifix sits above the altar. On the epistle side, there is a rococo altarpiece which displays reliefs of souls and the Holy Trinity. On the other side of the nave, there is a crucifix and a rococo altarpiece, identical to the one on the Epistle side, but with gilded reliefs.

The door of the nave is decorated with a relief of the Resurrection. In the baptistery, behind the choir, there is a baptismal font with a relief of a pattée cross on one of its sides. By comparing this font to the one held by the nearby Church of San Pelayo in Villasila de Valdavia, it can be dated to the end of the 18th century.

The church also contains other modern works of artistic interest, most notably a depiction of the Sacred Heart of Jesus that was donated by the family of Martín Cabezón at the beginning of the 20th century for the safe return of their son Marcos Cabezón from the Third Carlist War.

There are two large religious banners. One which is used for holidays, with three bands of the same size, where the first and third are crimson and the middle one is white with the cross of Santiago in the middle, also crimson. The other banner is purple, with gold trimmings, and displayed during burials and celebrations of the Passion of Jesus. Both banners are accompanied by a bronze processional cross and two 18th-century lanterns.

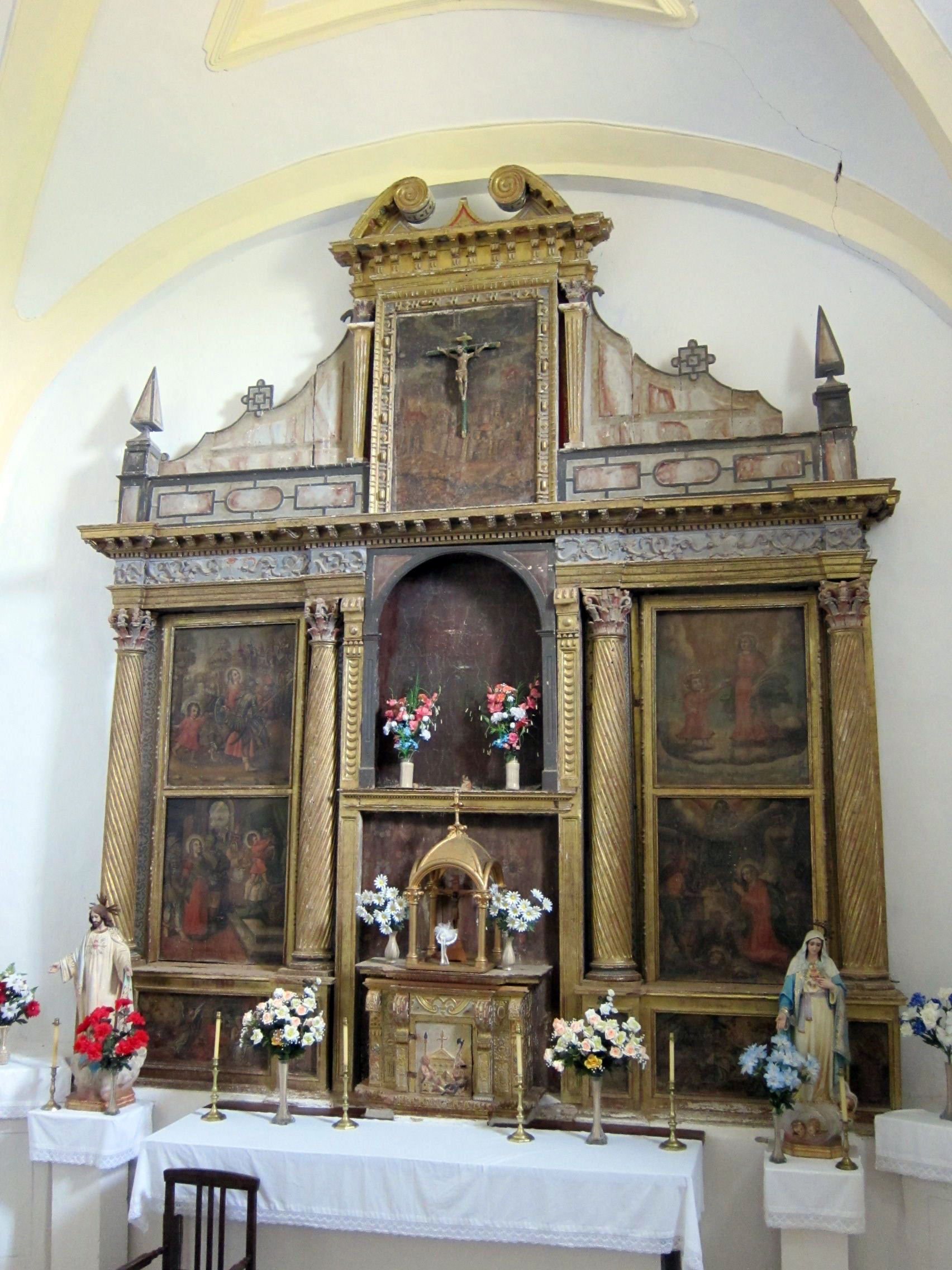
The main altarpiece.

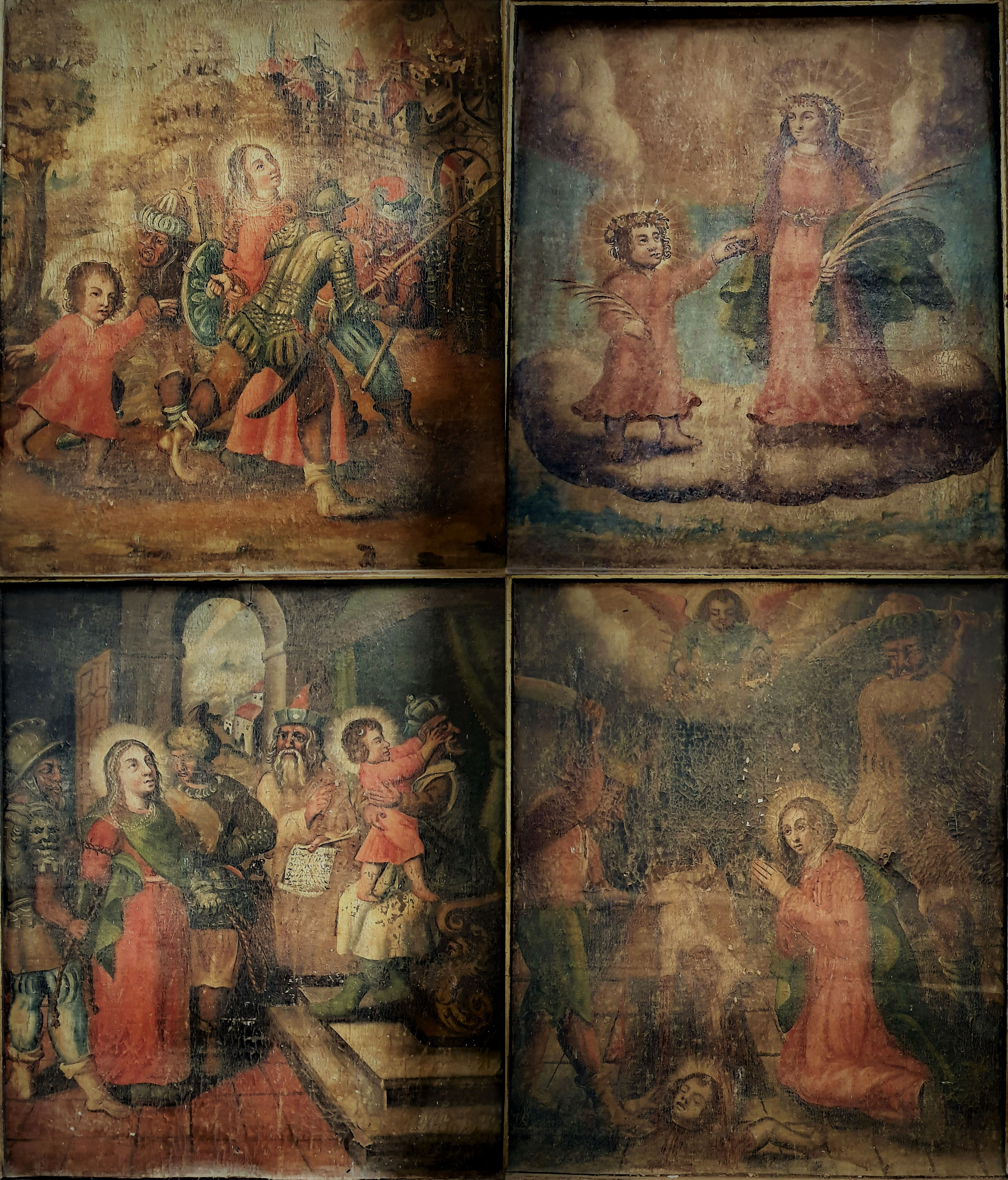
Parts of the main altar depicting the life and martyrdom of Saints Cyricus and Julitta.

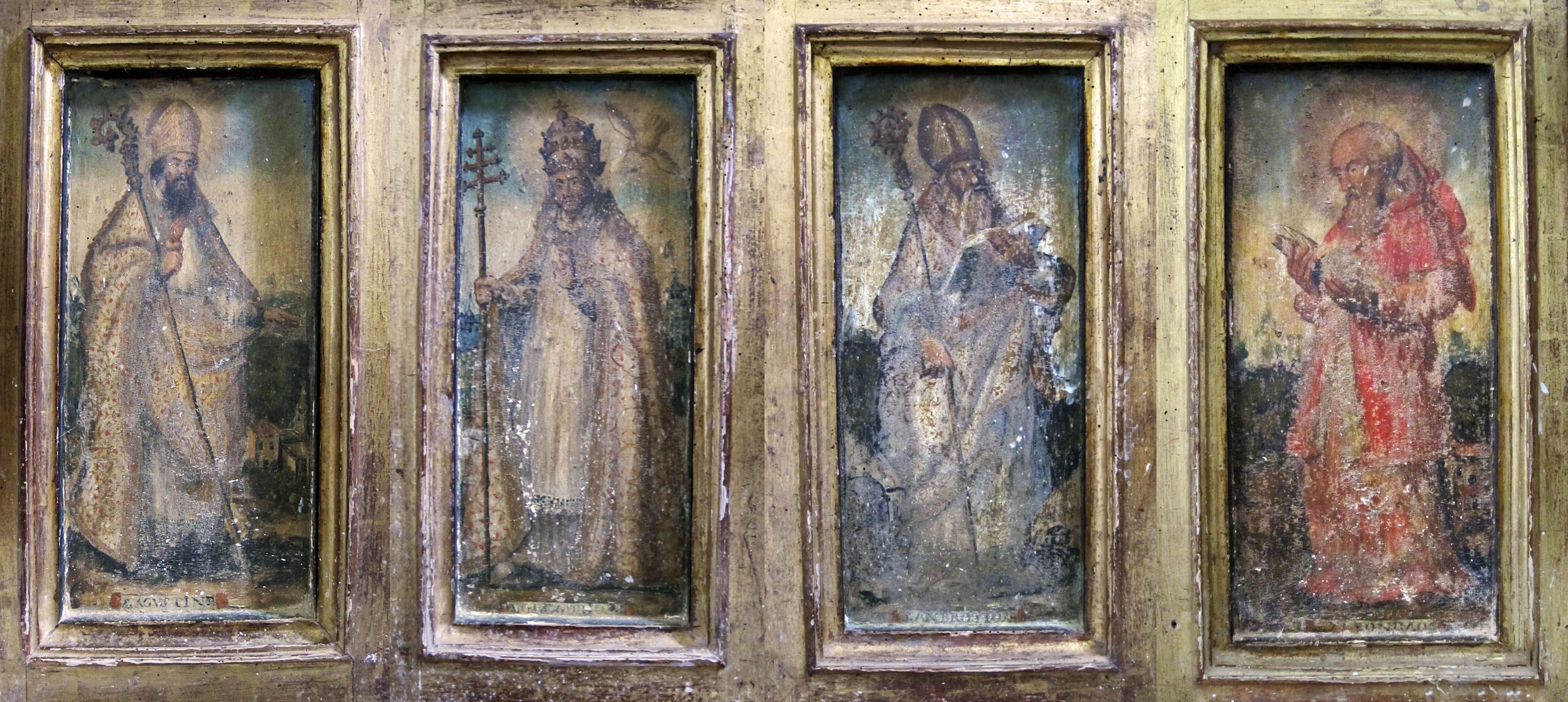
Depictions of the four fathers of the church.

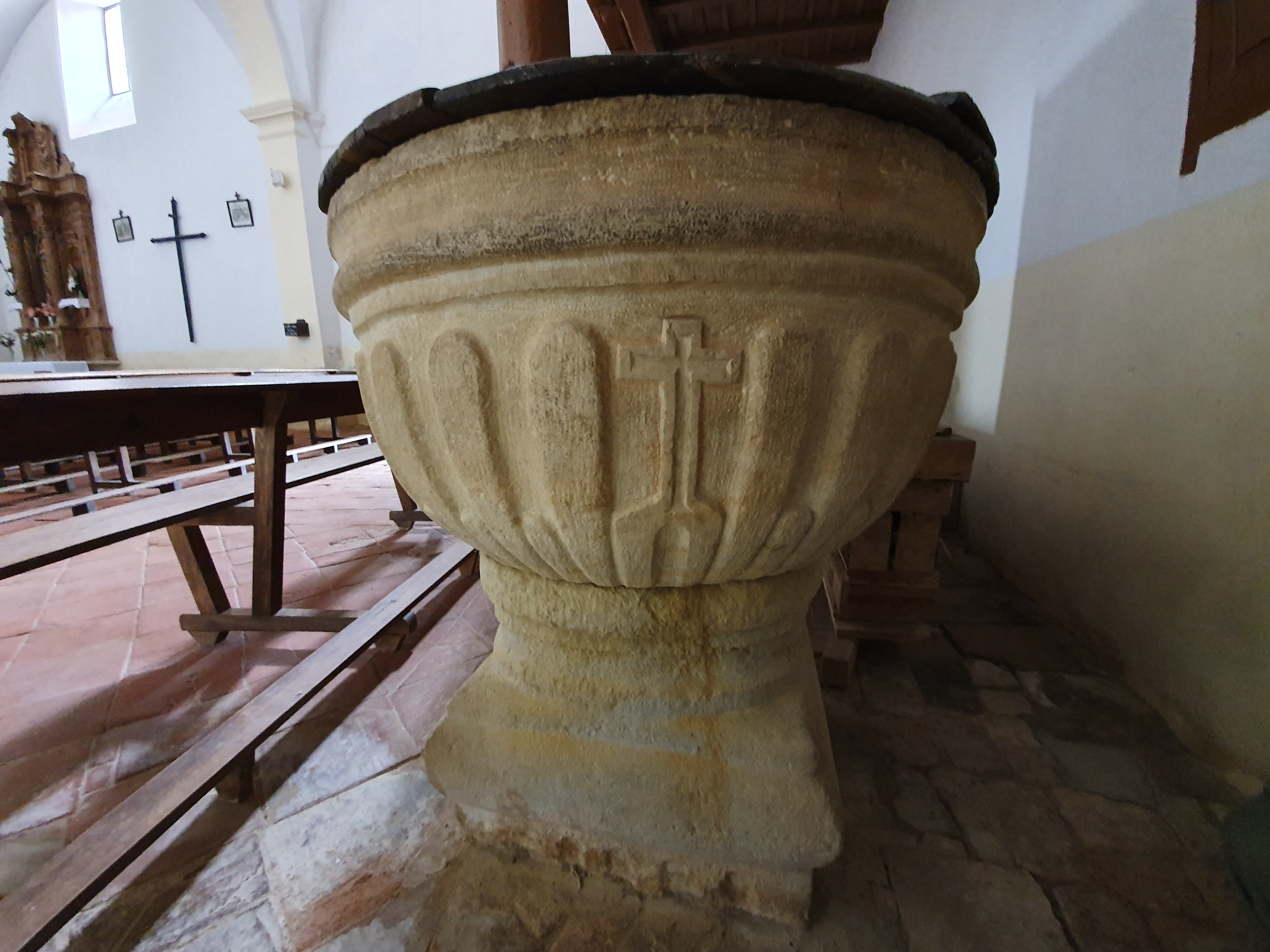
Baptismal font, c. 18th century.

== Conservation and restoration ==
Juan de la Cuesta's work presented structural issues from an early date. It was necessary to reinforce the building with period buttresses so that they would reinforce the pressures that the groin vaults projected outwards. The area of the apse is reinforced with very thick but low buttresses, since in this area the church tends to open up as well. In the cemetery area, the base of these buttresses are eroded by humidity and burials, leaving the building unprotected. Therefore, the arch of the presbytery was reinforced with a double tensor that gave it stability in the mid-20th century. The second arch of the nave, however, is increasingly giving way inwards, endangering the integrity of the second vault. In addition, at the end of the 20th century, the base of the whole church was painted with plastic paint, which caused the humidity to seep into walls, rather than drain through the flooring, which weakening the integrity of the walls. Because of restoration issues, the building has been included on the "Red List" (Spanish: Lista roja de patrimonio en peligro) of the Association for the care and promotion of heritage, Hispania Nostra since November 2019.

== Bibliography ==
- Narganes Quijano, Faustino; González Díez, Emiliano (2004), Historia abreviada en el curso medio de Valdavia: Villabasta, Villaeles, Arenillas de Nuño Pérez, Villasila y Villamelendro (in Spanish), City Hall of Villabasta, ISBN 84-606-3616-X
- Alcalde Crespo, Gonzalo (1999), La Vega, Loma y Valdavia: (Saldaña-Valdavia) (in Spanish), Palencia: Cálamo, ISBN 84-95018-18-7
