= J. Gerald Phelan =

American architect (1893–1981)

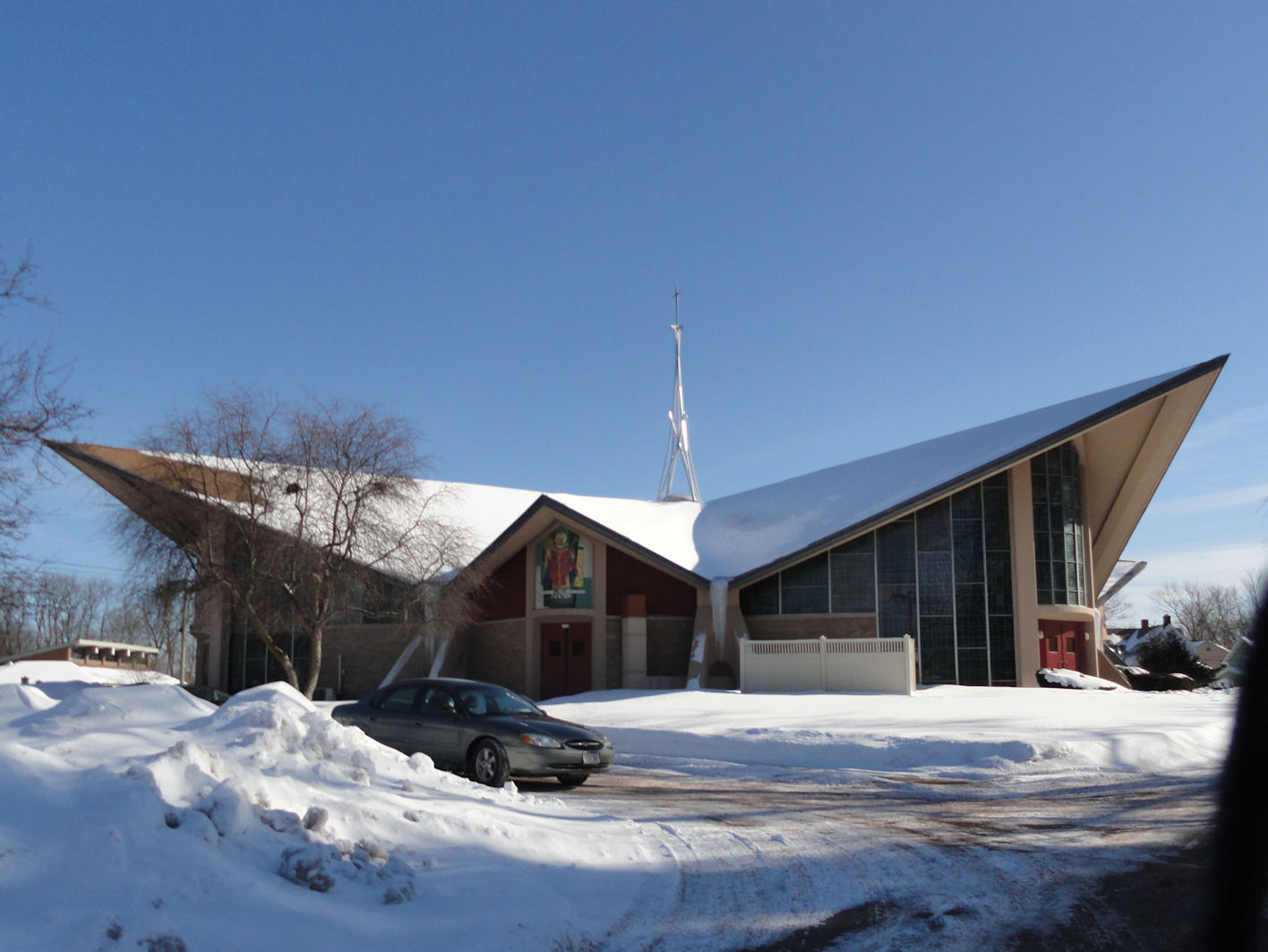
- St. Mary Church, East Hartford, CT – J. Gerald Phelan, architect East Hardford's Cathedral
- Born: 1893; Bridgeport, Connecticut, U.S.
- Died: 1981 (aged 87–88); Bridgeport, Connecticut, U.S.
- Known for: Architect

J. Gerald Phelan (January 29, 1893 – March 23, 1981) was a U.S. architect and corporate executive who was very active throughout the Eastern part of the United States throughout the middle part of the 20th century.

== Childhood and architectural training ==
Phelan was born in Bridgeport, Connecticut and received his architectural training from the Pratt Institute in Brooklyn, New York, (class of 1913) after which he worked for two years as a designer for A. C. Kelley and Co, Bridgeport, Connecticut.

== Fletcher Thompson ==
He joined the Bridgeport, Connecticut engineering firm of Fletcher Thompson in 1916 as a draftsman and worked his way up to managing principal in 1931. He later become the firm's president and served in that capacity until his retirement in 1970.

Pratt Institute's J. Gerald Phelan Award for Architecture is named in his honor.

== Honorary degree and honors ==
In 1969 Phelan was awarded a Doctor of Arts honorary degree from Fairfield University for whom he had designed 10 buildings over the years. He was also awarded the Alumnus of the Year award from the Pratt Institute.

== Personal life ==
Phelan was a longtime member of the American Institute of Architects (AIA) and served as the president of the Connecticut Chapter between 1942 and 1943.

== Works include ==
=== Connecticut ===
- Ascension Church, Hamden, CT (with Robert H. Mutrux, AIA)
- Blessed Sacrament Church, Bridgeport, CT
- Fairfield University. Fairfield, CT (at least 10 buildings)
- Holy Family Church, Fairfield, CT
- St. Ann Church, Bridgeport, CT
- St. James Church, Rocky Hill, CT
- St. James Church, Stratford, CT
- St. Jerome Church, New Britain, CT
- St. Lawrence Church, Shelton, CT
- St. Mary Church, East Hartford, CT (with Robert H, Mutrux, AIA)
- St. Pius X Church, Fairfield, CT
- St. Rose of Lima Church, East Hartford, Connecticut
- St. Theresa Church, Trumbull, CT
- Our Lady of the Assumption Church, Fairfield, CT
- Our Lady of Perpetual Help Church, Washington Depot, Connecticut
- St. Francia of Assisi Church, South Windsor, Connecticut

=== Massachusetts ===
- St. Catherine of Sienna Church, Springfield, MA

=== New Jersey ===
- Seton Hall University South Orange, NJ (3 buildings)
- St. John Vianney Church Colonia, New Jersey
- St. Philomena Church, Livingston, NJ (with George N. Overath AIA and J. P. Boulanger)

== Reading ==
- Phelan, J. Gerald. "American Architects Directory First edition, 1956 R.R. Bowker LLC" (PDF). Archived from the original (PDF) on March 31, 2012.
- Phelan, J. Gerald. "American Architects Directory First edition, 1970 R.R. Bowker LLC" (PDF). Archived from the original (PDF) on June 15, 2012.
