= Our Lady of Grace Church (Reserve, Louisiana) =

Historic church in Louisiana, United States

- U.S. National Register of Historic Places
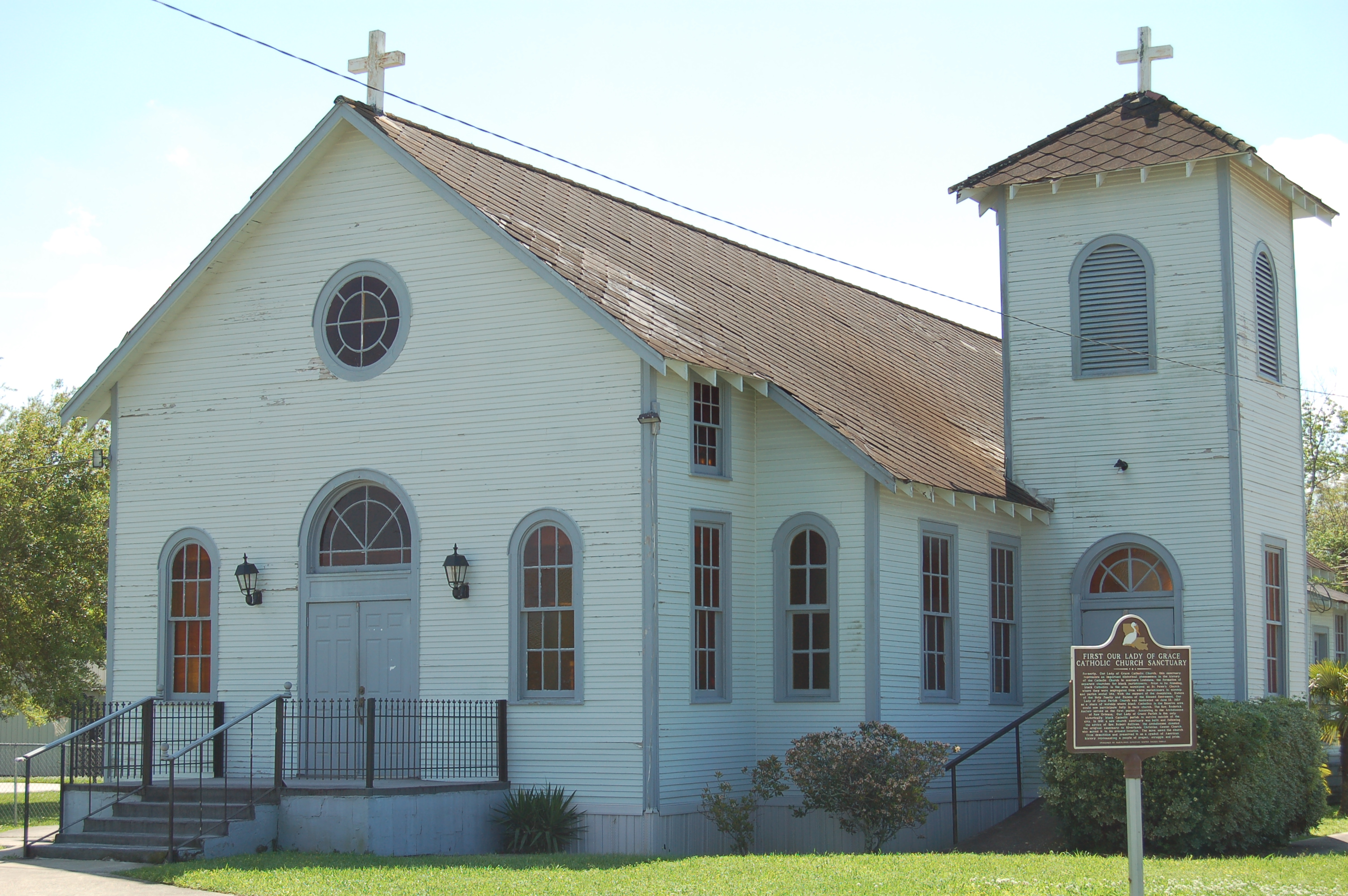

- Location within Louisiana Location within the United States
- Location: Near jct. of Airline Hwy. and 3rd St., Reserve, Louisiana
- Coordinates: 30°4′23″N 90°33′23″W
- Area: less than one acre
- Built: 1937
- NRHP reference No.: 05001277
- Added to NRHP: November 15, 2005

Our Lady of Grace Church is a historic Black Catholic church near the junction of Airline Highway and 3rd Street in Reserve, Louisiana. It was built in 1937, moved to that location in 1992 to avoid demolition, and added to the National Register of Historic Places in 2005.

It was deemed "significant in the areas of religion, social history and ethnic heritage because it represents an important historical phenomenon in the history of the Catholic Church in southern Louisiana - the formation of separate churches for African-American parishioners."

It is staffed by priests from the Josephites and was listed on the Louisiana African American Heritage Trail in 2012.
