= Our Lady of Graces Chapel, Qrendi =

Chapel of Our Lady of Graces
- Il-Kappella tal-Madonna tal-Grazzja
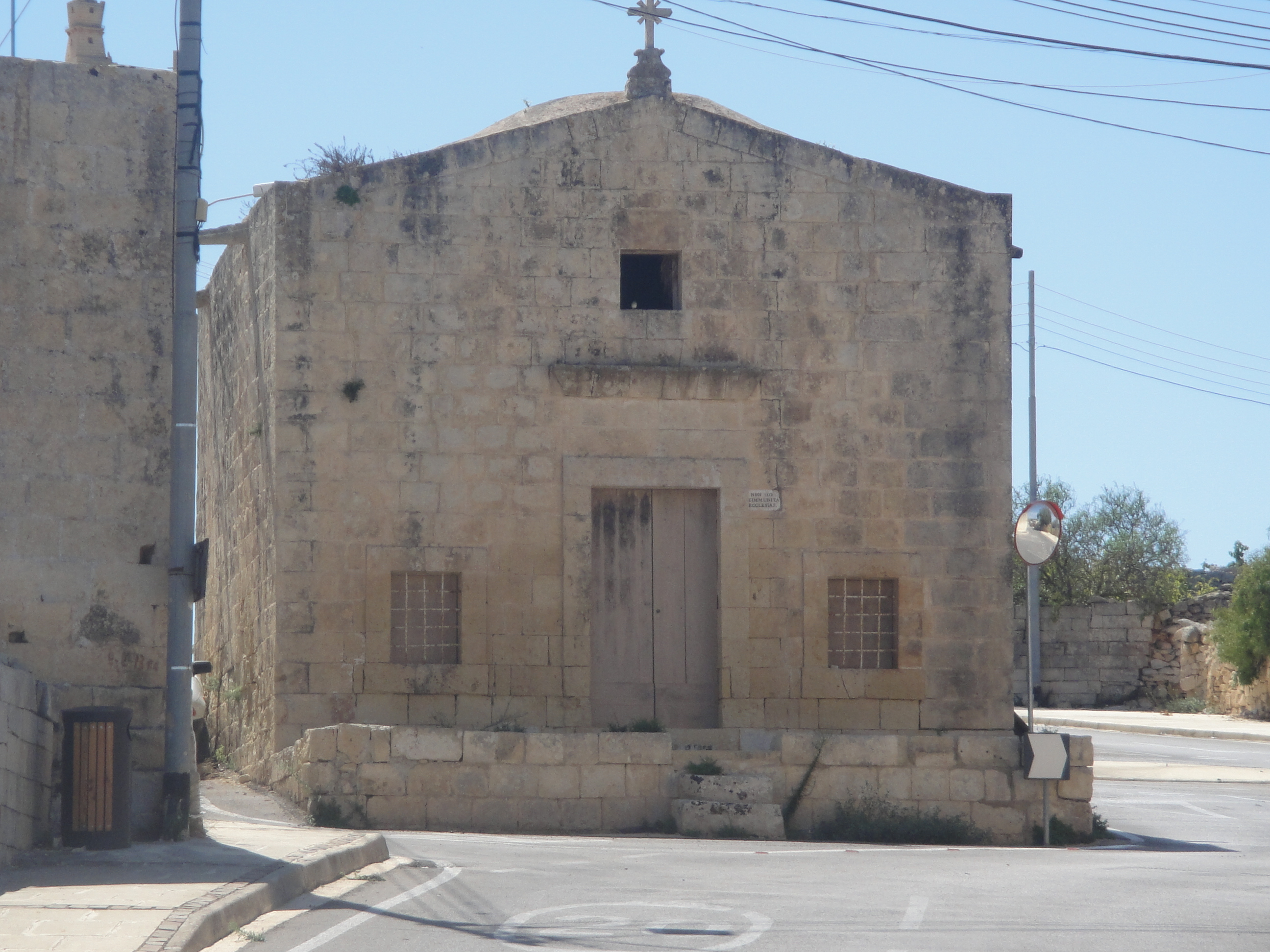

- 35°49′52.6″N 14°27′13.8″E
- Location: Qrendi
- Country: Malta
- Denomination: Roman Catholic

History
- Status: Active
- Dedication: Our Lady of Graces

Architecture
- Functional status: Church

Administration
- Archdiocese: Malta
- Parish: Qrendi

Clergy
- Archbishop: Charles Scicluna

The Chapel of Our Lady of Graces (Maltese: Tal-Grazzja) is a Roman Catholic chapel located in the area known as Tal-Maqluba in Qrendi, Malta.

== History ==
This chapel was built in the year 1658 by Angelo Spiteri from Qrendi and dedicated to Our Lady of Victories. However, later the church was rededicated to Our lady of Graces. Spiteri left funds which were to be used for the singing of vespers and the celebration of Mass on the feast day. The church was restored in 2007.

== Exterior and Interior ==
The present chapel has a simple facade with no decoration except for three square windows – one on each side of the door and the third one high up above it. On the very top of the church there is a small stone crucifix. The two side windows have a kneeling block for the faithful who wished to pray even when the chapel was closed. A plaque on the facade of the chapel states Non Gode L'Immunita Ecclesiastica meaning that this church does not provide church immunity to criminal offenders who seek sanctuary in the church. The interior includes one stone altar and since its restoration a small painting was added. The ceiling includes several round arches.
