= Church of Our Lady of Grace (Hoboken, New Jersey) =

Historic church in New Jersey, United States

- U.S. National Register of Historic Places
- New Jersey Register of Historic Places
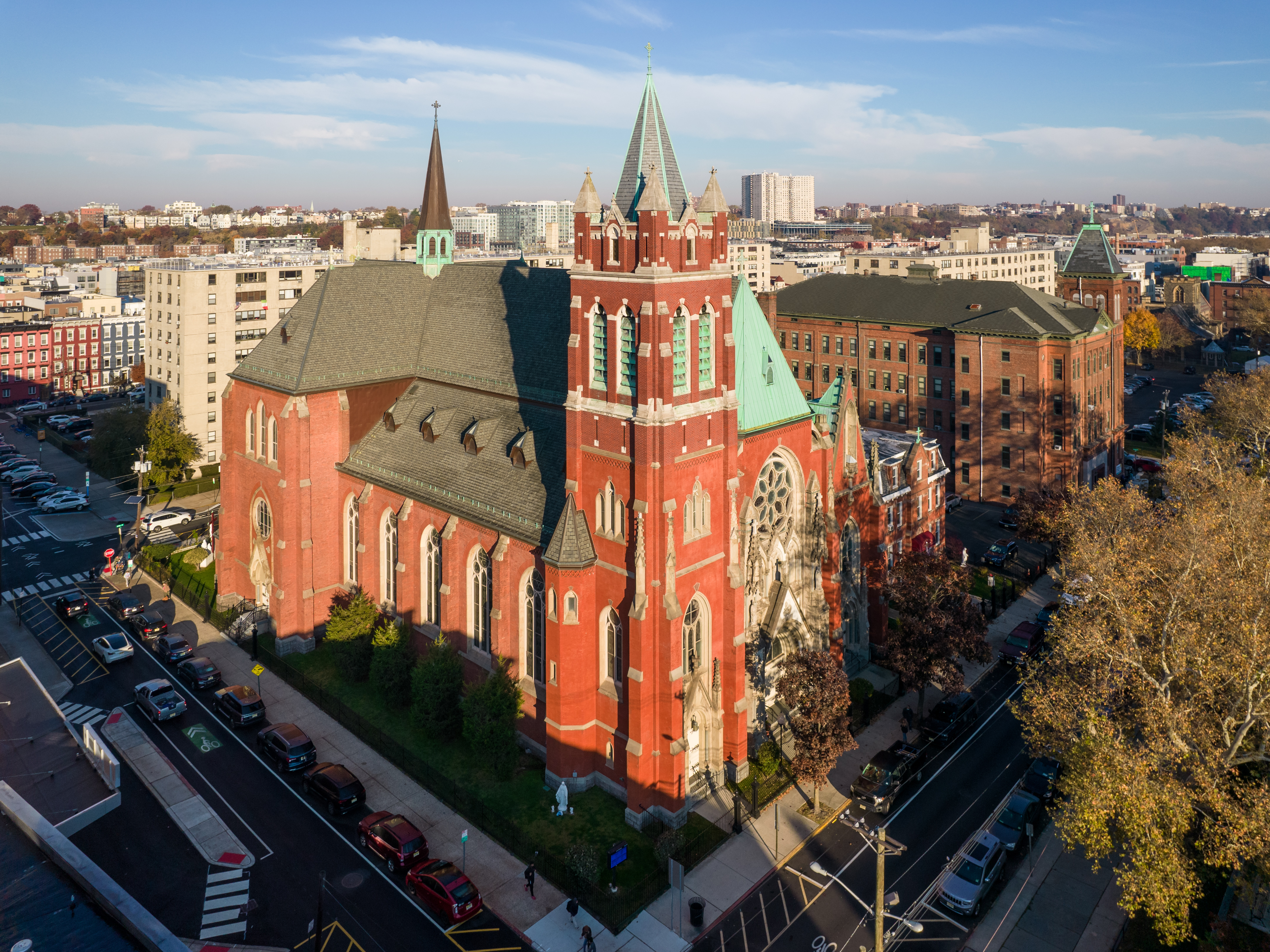

- Location within Hudson County, New Jersey Location within New Jersey Location within the United States
- Location: 400 Willow Avenue, Hoboken, New Jersey
- Coordinates: 40°44′32″N 74°2′2″W
- Area: less than one acre
- Built: 1874
- Architect: Himpler, Francis G.; Whyte, William J.
- Architectural style: Gothic
- NRHP reference No.: 96000550
- NJRHP No.: 3182

Significant dates
- Added to NRHP: May 31, 1996
- Designated NJRHP: April 10, 1996

The Church of Our Lady of Grace is a Roman Catholic church built between 1874 and 1876. It is situated in Hoboken, Hudson County, New Jersey, United States. It is a Gothic-style church designed by Francis G. Himpler and William J. Whyte. Located on the corner of Fourth St. and Willow St. in Hoboken, it was listed on the National Register of Historic Places in 1996.

The exterior of the church was used for scenes in the 1954 film On the Waterfront.

== See also ==
- National Register of Historic Places listings in Hudson County, New Jersey
