= Our Lady of Grace Church (Stratford, Connecticut) =

Coordinates: 41°13′02.19″N 73°09′20.23″W

- Our Lady of Grace Church
- Location: 497 Second Hill Lane; Stratford, Connecticut
- Country: United States
- Denomination: Roman Catholic

Architecture
- Architect: Andrew G. Patrick

Administration
- Province: Hartford
- Diocese: Bridgeport

Clergy
- Bishop: Most Rev. William E. Lori

Our Lady of Grace is a Roman Catholic church in Stratford, Connecticut. It is part of the Diocese of Bridgeport.

== History ==
This parish was created in 1954 in an area previously covered by St. James parish. The red brick Italian Romanesque Revival building was designed by local church architect Andrew G. Patrick.
