= Château de Reichenberg =

Château in Haut-Rhin, Alsace, France

Coordinates: 48.2144°N 7.3376°E

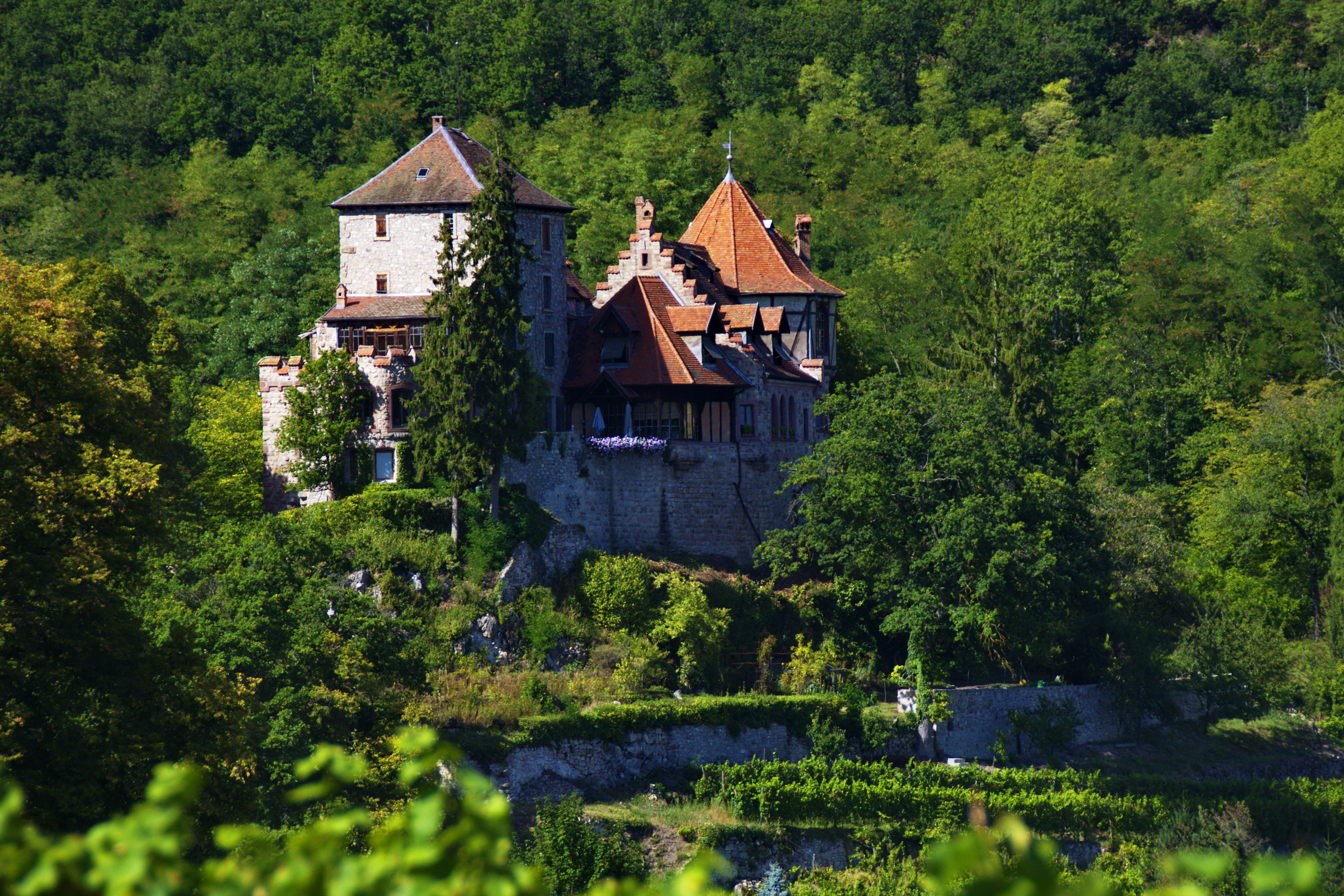
A view of the castle

Château de Reichenberg is a late-19th and early 20th century château in the commune of Bergheim, in the department of Haut-Rhin, Alsace, France. It is a listed historical monument since 1995.
