= Église Notre-Dame de l'Assomption, Bergheim =

Église Notre-Dame de l′Assomption
- Église catholique de l′Assomption de la Bienheureuse Vierge Marie
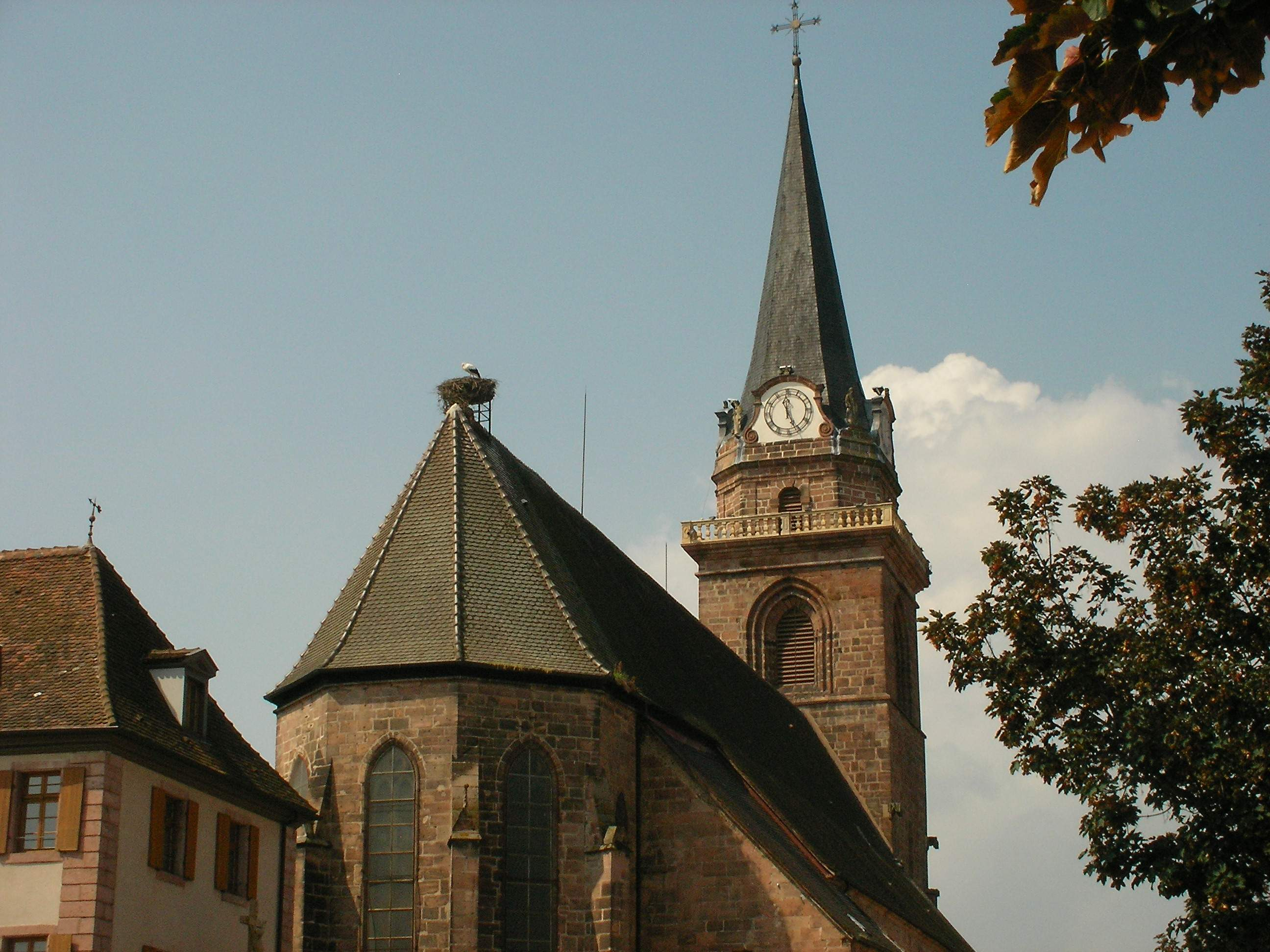
- Église Notre-Dame de l′Assomption
- 48°12′18″N 7°21′53″E
- Location: Bergheim, Haut-Rhin
- Country: France
- Denomination: Catholic
- Website: http://www.paroisses-bergheim.fr/joomla/

History
- Founded: 1320; 1718
- Dedication: Mary, mother of Jesus

Architecture
- Heritage designation: Monument historique
- Designated: 15 November 1985
- Style: Gothic; Neoclassical
- Completed: 1347; 1725

Administration
- Archdiocese: Archdiocese of Strasbourg
- Parish: Communauté de paroisses du Bon Pasteur, entre Ill et Taennchel

Notre-Dame de l′Assomption (Our Lady of the Assumption) is a Catholic parish church in the small town of Bergheim, in the Haut-Rhin department of France. It is classified as a Monument historique since 1985.

The current Bergheim church building was preceded by an earlier one, already dedicated to Mary, recorded in the year 705 and visited by Bernard of Clairvaux in 1146, while on his way from Basel to Worms to rally for the Second Crusade. That previous church was destroyed in 1287 during the great fire of Bergheim, which was started by the troops of Rudolf I of Germany.
The current Bergheim church was built from 1320 to 1347 and largely modified from 1718 to 1725, which accounts for the fact that it presents features both of Gothic architecture and of Neoclassical architecture.

The church is remarkable for its Gothic frescoes (both on the outside and the inside), which had been concealed in the 18th-century and rediscovered in 1959. A pair of Gothic statues from around 1460 are thought to be from the workshop of Nikolaus Gerhaert. The pipe organ is a 1903 instrument in a Baroque 1740 organ case.

== Gallery ==
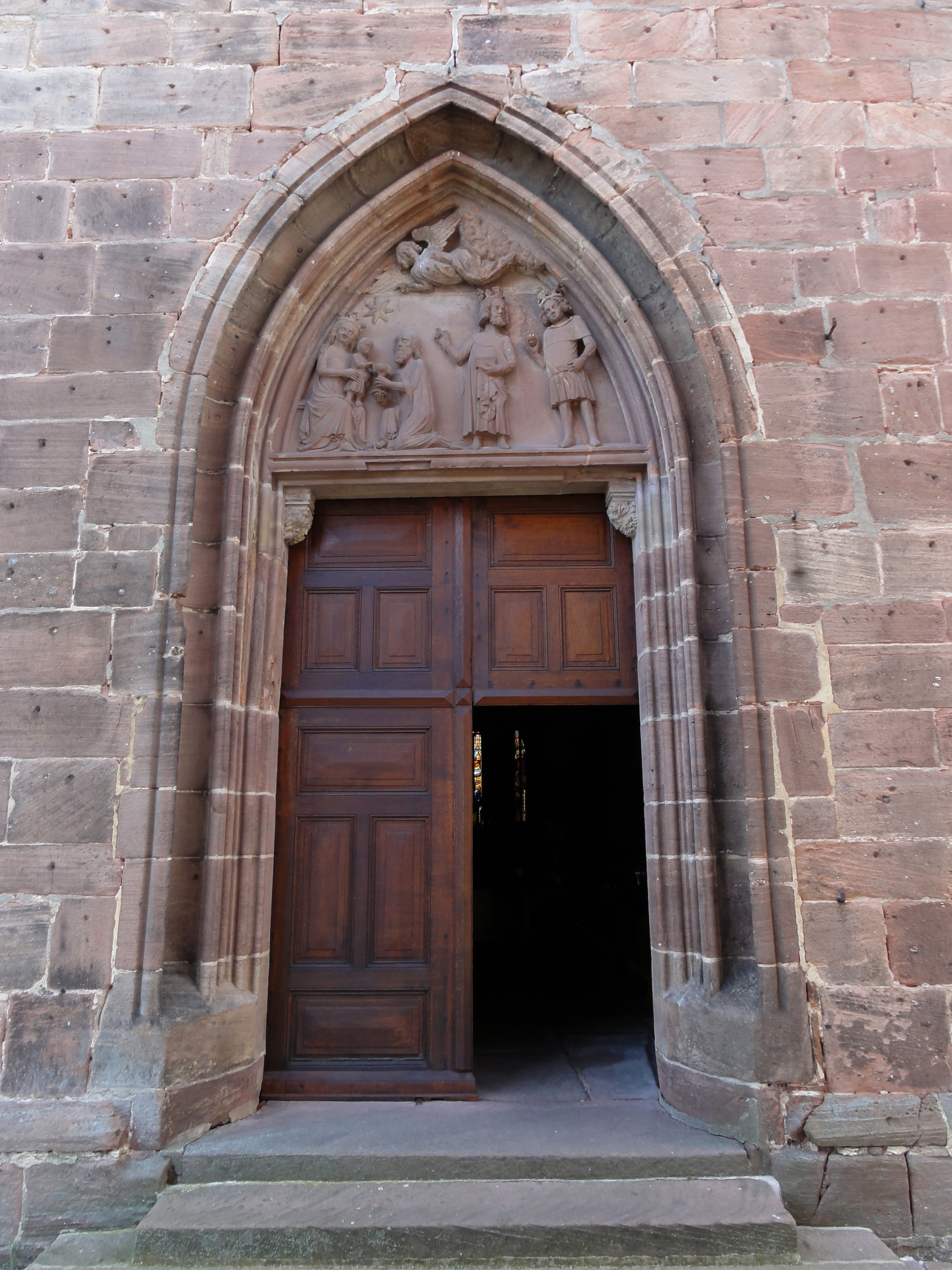
Main portal

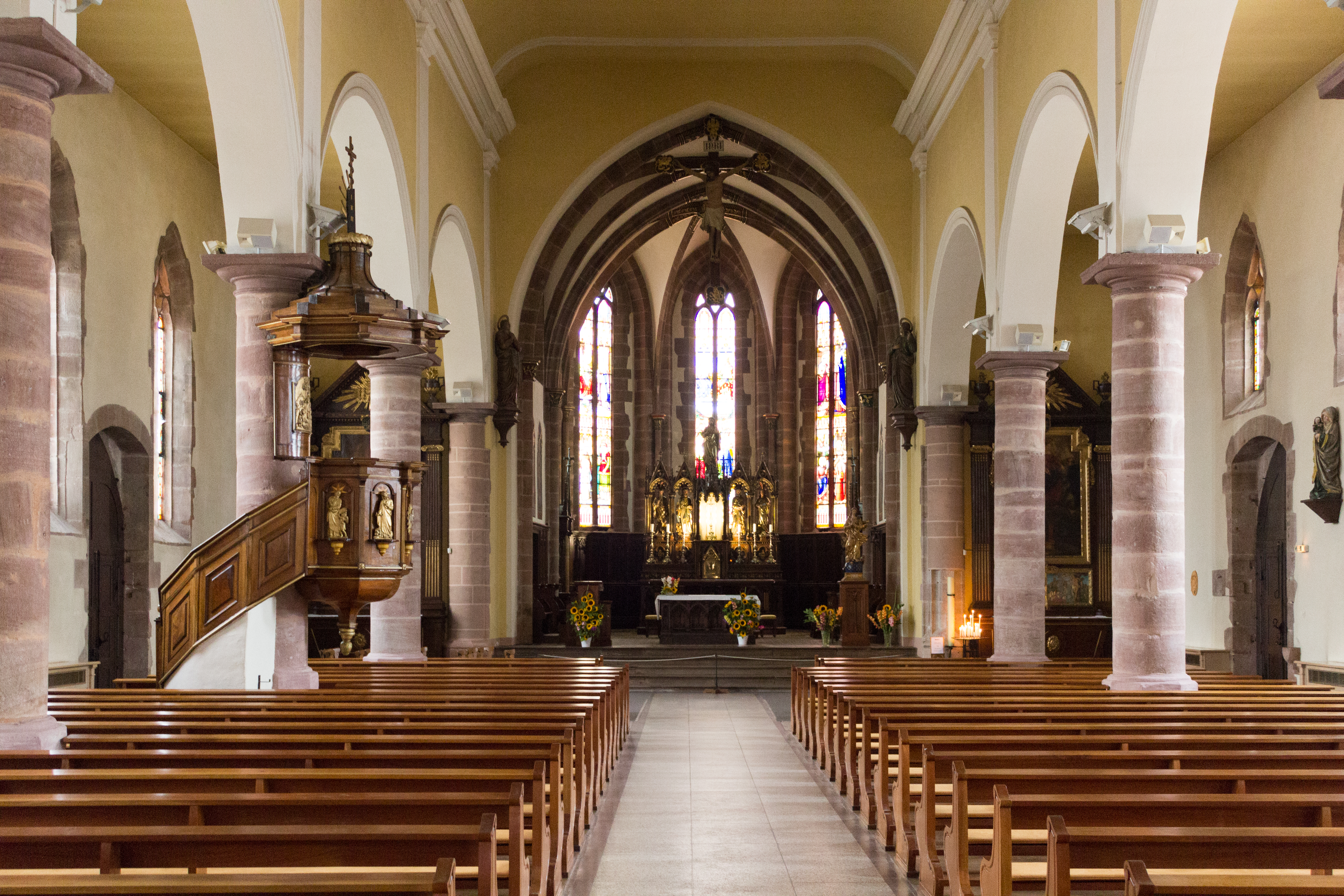
Inside, looking east

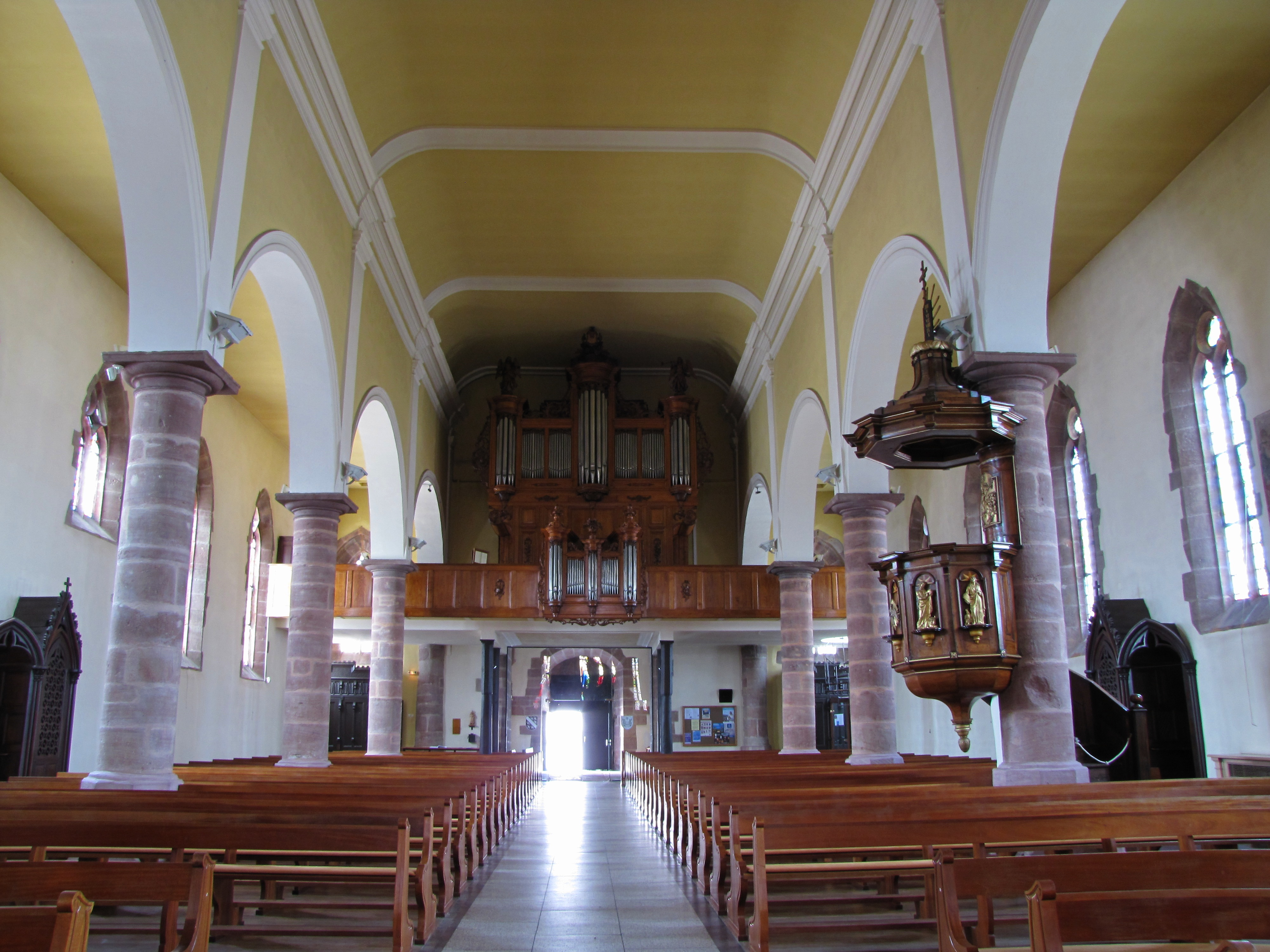
Inside, looking west

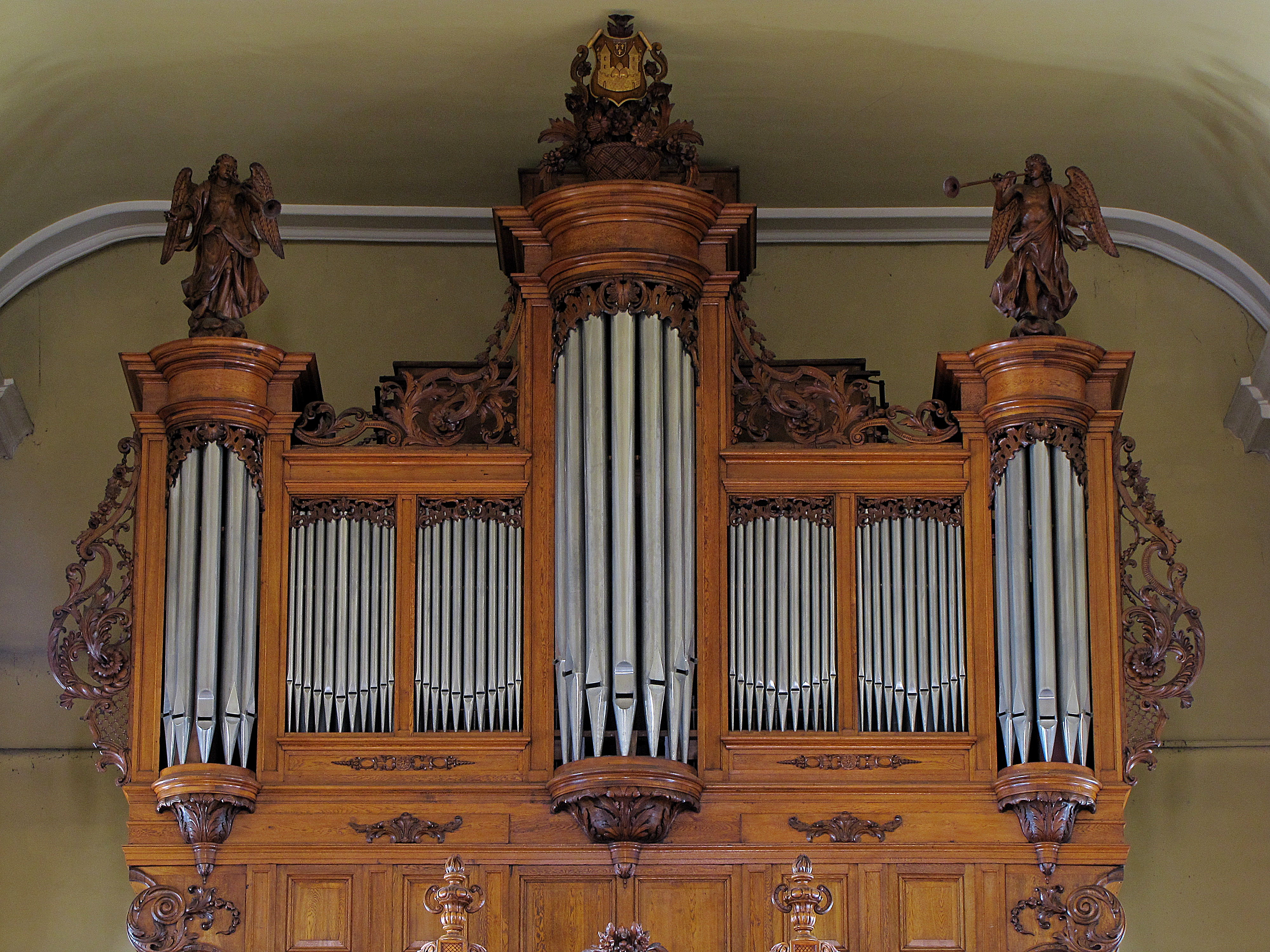
Detail of the organ case

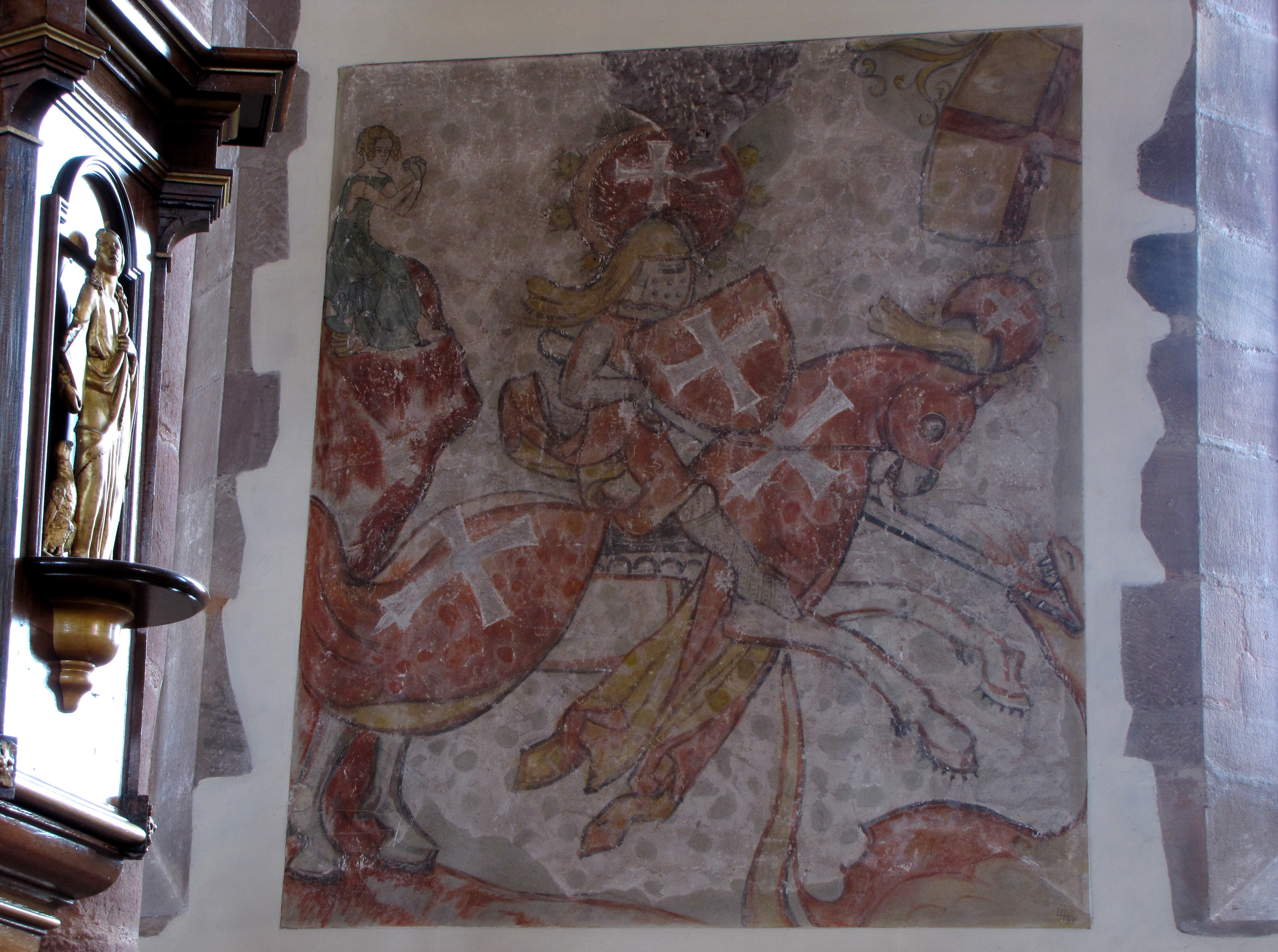
Fresco (14th century): Saint George and the Dragon

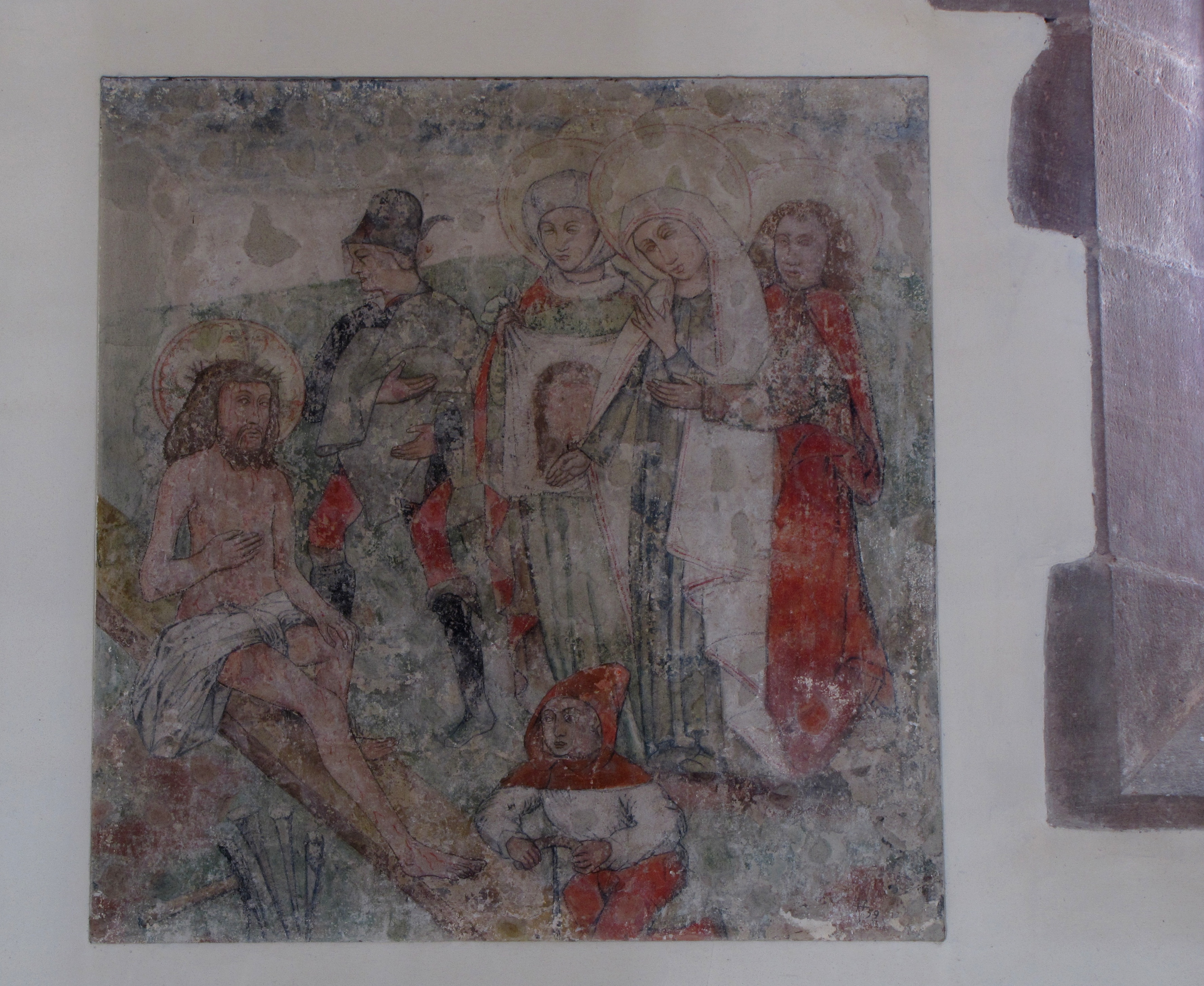
Fresco (15th century): Before the Crucifixion

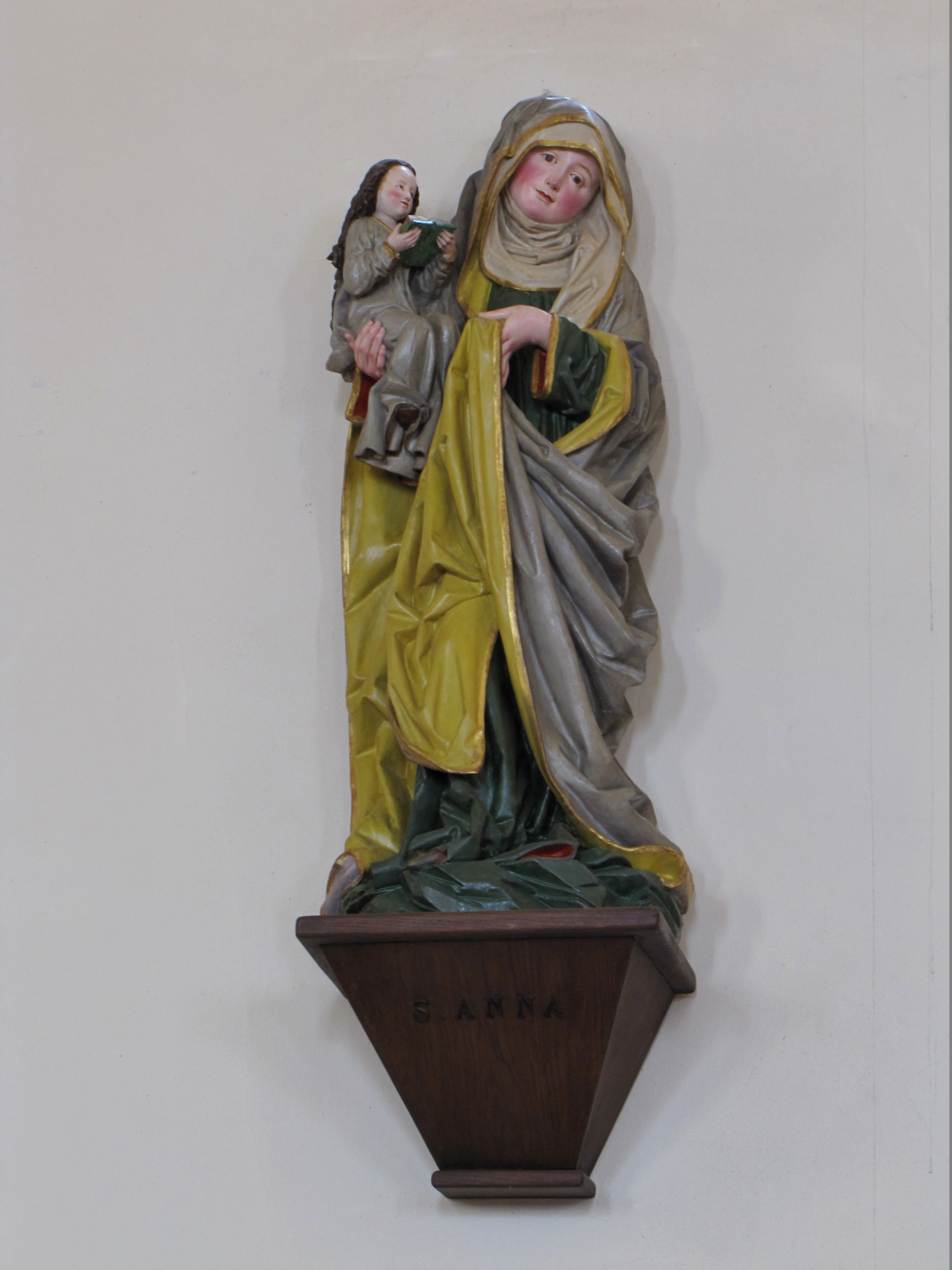
Statue (ca. 1460): Anne and Mary

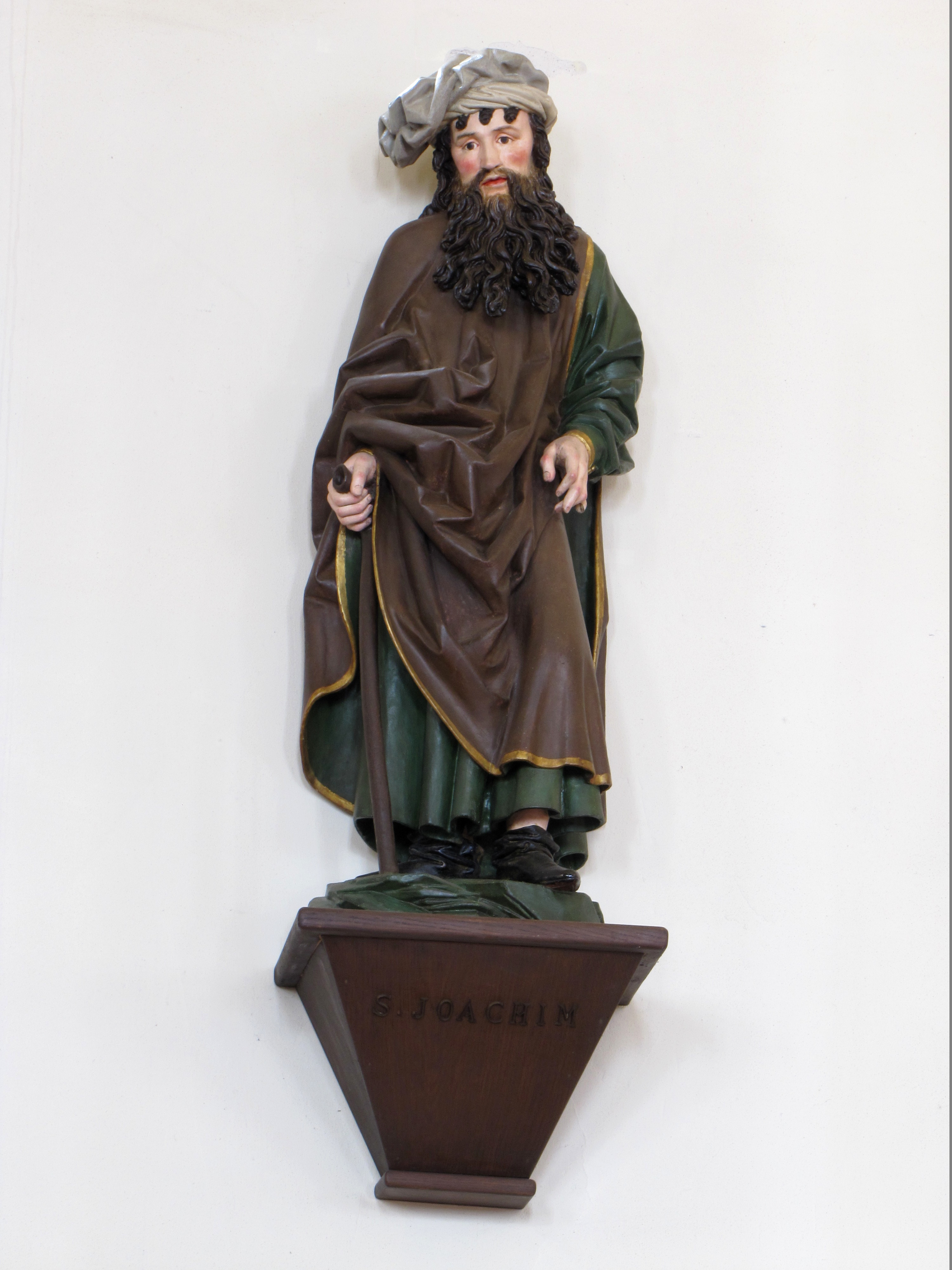
Statue (ca. 1460): Joachim
