= Bergheim, Haut-Rhin =

Commune in Grand Est, France

Bergheim
- Commune
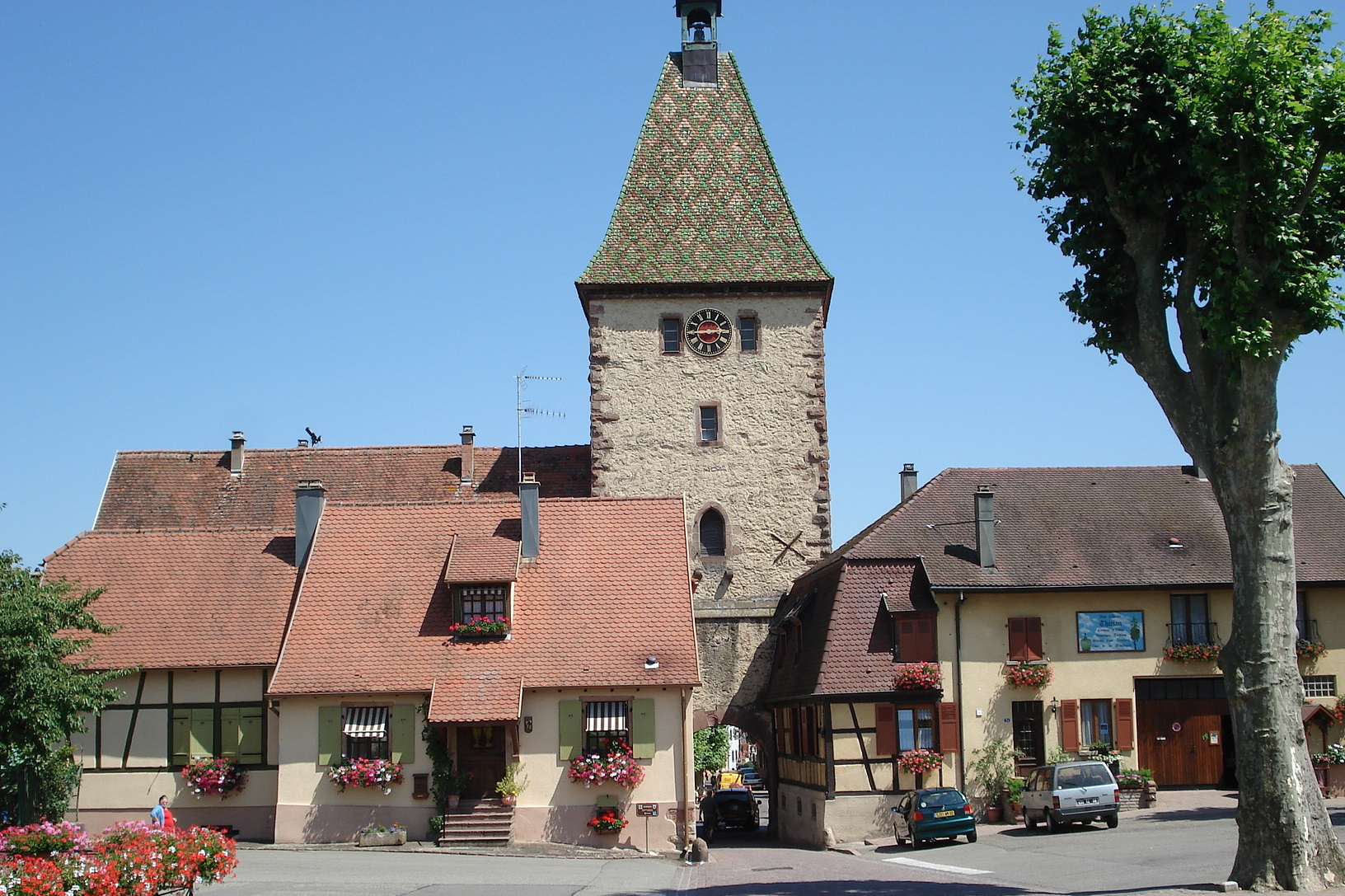
- Porte Haute (Upper Gate) in Bergheim

- Coat of arms
- Location of Bergheim
- Location within France Location within Grand Est
- Coordinates: 48°12′21″N 7°21′45″E
- Country: France
- Region: Grand Est
- Department: Haut-Rhin
- Arrondissement: Colmar-Ribeauvillé
- Canton: Sainte-Marie-aux-Mines
- Intercommunality: Pays de Ribeauvillé

Government
  - Mayor (2020–2026): Elisabeth Schneider
- Area^{1}: 19.16 km^{2} (7.40 sq mi)
- Highest elevation: 733 m (2,405 ft)
- Lowest elevation: 172 m (564 ft)
- Population (2023): 2,069
  - Density: 108.0/km^{2} (279.7/sq mi)
- Time zone: UTC+01:00 (CET)
  - Summer (DST): UTC+02:00 (CEST)
- INSEE/Postal code: 68028 /68750
- ^{1} French Land Register data, which excludes lakes, ponds, glaciers > 1 km^{2} (0.386 sq mi or 247 acres) and river estuaries.

Bergheim (French pronunciation: [bɛʁɡaim]) is a commune in the Haut-Rhin department in Grand Est in north-eastern France.

It is a completely fortified town and has a late-medieval church, as well as surviving towers and walls. The entire population was wiped out by two wars and the plague in the 17th-18th centuries. To replace the population, thousands of people from other countries were invited to immigrate to Bergheim. The majority of people who immigrated at that times were Swiss, German, Hungarian, Austrian, or Romanian.

The city economy is based on tourism and the viticulture that surrounds the town. It is a member of Les Plus Beaux Villages de France (The Most Beautiful Villages of France) Association.

== Geography ==
=== Climate ===
Bergheim has an oceanic climate (Köppen climate classification Cfb). The average annual temperature in Bergheim is 11.0 °C (51.8 °F). The average annual rainfall is 677.6 mm (26.68 in) with May as the wettest month. The temperatures are highest on average in July, at around 20.0 °C (68.0 °F), and lowest in January, at around 2.0 °C (35.6 °F). The highest temperature ever recorded in Bergheim was 38.9 °C (102.0 °F) on 13 August 2003; the coldest temperature ever recorded was −16.9 °C (1.6 °F) on 20 December 2009.

Climate data for Bergheim (1981–2010 averages, extremes 1987−present)
| Month | Jan | Feb | Mar | Apr | May | Jun | Jul | Aug | Sep | Oct | Nov | Dec | Year |
|---|---|---|---|---|---|---|---|---|---|---|---|---|---|
| Record high °C (°F) | 17.0 (62.6) | 20.8 (69.4) | 25.4 (77.7) | 29.5 (85.1) | 33.5 (92.3) | 36.9 (98.4) | 37.3 (99.1) | 38.9 (102.0) | 31.8 (89.2) | 28.7 (83.7) | 23.0 (73.4) | 20.1 (68.2) | 38.9 (102.0) |
| Mean daily maximum °C (°F) | 4.7 (40.5) | 6.8 (44.2) | 11.0 (51.8) | 15.0 (59.0) | 19.8 (67.6) | 22.8 (73.0) | 24.9 (76.8) | 24.8 (76.6) | 20.2 (68.4) | 14.9 (58.8) | 8.4 (47.1) | 4.9 (40.8) | 14.9 (58.8) |
| Daily mean °C (°F) | 2.0 (35.6) | 3.5 (38.3) | 7.2 (45.0) | 10.6 (51.1) | 15.1 (59.2) | 18.0 (64.4) | 20.0 (68.0) | 19.8 (67.6) | 15.7 (60.3) | 11.2 (52.2) | 5.6 (42.1) | 2.4 (36.3) | 11.0 (51.8) |
| Mean daily minimum °C (°F) | −0.7 (30.7) | 0.2 (32.4) | 3.3 (37.9) | 6.2 (43.2) | 10.4 (50.7) | 13.2 (55.8) | 15.0 (59.0) | 14.8 (58.6) | 11.2 (52.2) | 7.5 (45.5) | 2.8 (37.0) | −0.1 (31.8) | 7.0 (44.6) |
| Record low °C (°F) | −15.8 (3.6) | −15.3 (4.5) | −11.1 (12.0) | −2.5 (27.5) | 1.6 (34.9) | 4.5 (40.1) | 7.6 (45.7) | 7.0 (44.6) | 2.3 (36.1) | −3.3 (26.1) | −8.8 (16.2) | −16.9 (1.6) | −16.9 (1.6) |
| Average precipitation mm (inches) | 40.7 (1.60) | 48.1 (1.89) | 47.5 (1.87) | 45.2 (1.78) | 70.3 (2.77) | 65.9 (2.59) | 69.7 (2.74) | 62.3 (2.45) | 53.3 (2.10) | 64.0 (2.52) | 52.7 (2.07) | 57.9 (2.28) | 677.6 (26.68) |
| Average precipitation days (≥ 1.0 mm) | 9.0 | 9.1 | 10.0 | 9.4 | 11.1 | 10.4 | 9.7 | 9.6 | 8.4 | 10.1 | 10.3 | 10.1 | 117.2 |
Source: Meteociel

== Population ==
Historical population
| Year | Pop. | ±% p.a. |
|---|---|---|
| 1968 | 1,753 | — |
| 1975 | 1,703 | −0.41% |
| 1982 | 1,774 | +0.59% |
| 1990 | 1,802 | +0.20% |
| 1999 | 1,830 | +0.17% |
| 2007 | 1,860 | +0.20% |
| 2012 | 1,941 | +0.86% |
| 2017 | 2,121 | +1.79% |
| 2023 | 2,069 | −0.41% |
Source: INSEE

== Gallery ==
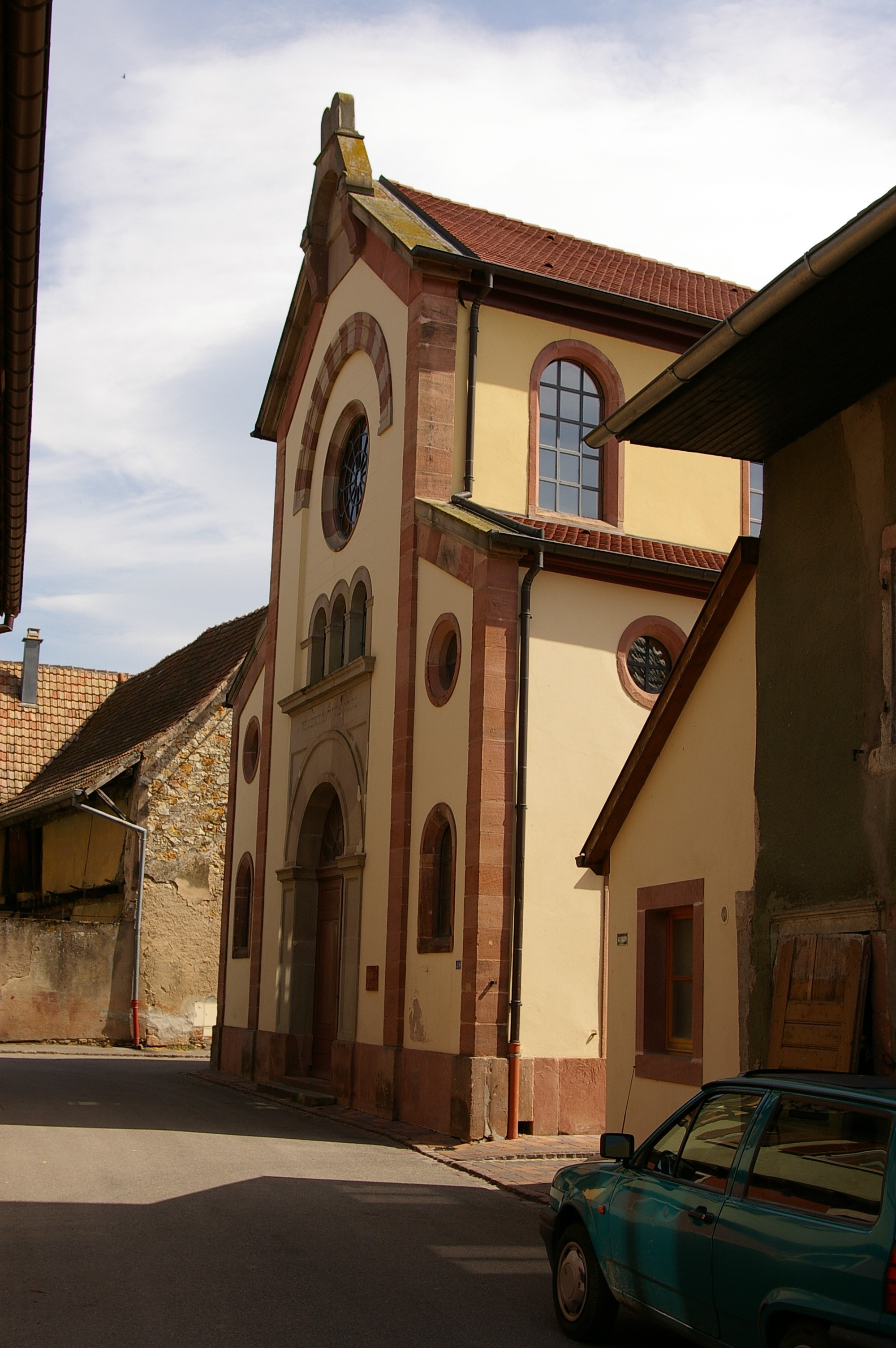
Bergheim synagogue

== See also ==
- Communes of the Haut-Rhin department
