= Wyoming statistical areas =

Coordinates: 42.9957°N 107.5512°W

The U.S. State of Wyoming currently has ten statistical areas that have been delineated by the Office of Management and Budget (OMB). On July 21, 2023, the OMB delineated two metropolitan statistical areas and eight micropolitan statistical areas in Wyoming. As of 2025, the most populous of these is the Cheyenne, WY Metropolitan Statistical Area, comprising the area around Cheyenne, Wyoming's capital and largest city.

== Statistical areas ==
The Office of Management and Budget (OMB) has designated more than 1,000 statistical areas for the United States and Puerto Rico. These statistical areas are important geographic delineations of population clusters used by the OMB, the United States Census Bureau, planning organizations, and federal, state, and local government entities.

The OMB defines a core-based statistical area (commonly referred to as a CBSA) as the county or counties (or county-equivalents) surrounding at least one densely-settled core of at least 10,000 population, "plus adjacent counties having a high degree of social and economic integration with the core as measured through commuting ties with the counties containing the core". The OMB further divides core-based statistical areas based on population into metropolitan statistical areas (MSAs) for those with at least 50,000 and micropolitan statistical areas (μSAs) for those with 10,000 to 49,999 people.

The OMB defines a combined statistical area (CSA) as two or more adjacent core-based statistical areas where the employment interchange rate (% commuting from A to B plus % commuting from B to A) is at least 15%. The primary statistical areas (PSAs) include all combined statistical areas and any core-based statistical area that is not a constituent of a combined statistical area.

The ten United States statistical areas and 23 counties of the State of Wyoming (Note: An out-of-state area and its population are displayed in green. An area that extends into more than one state is displayed in purple. A purple population number over a black population number show the total population versus the in-state population. The state's abbreviation is also shown next to the in-state total.)
| Core-based statistical area | 2025 population (est.) | County | 2025 population (est.) |
|---|---|---|---|
| Cheyenne, WY MSA | 102,938 | Laramie County, Wyoming | 102,938 |
| Casper, WY MSA | 80,526 | Natrona County, Wyoming | 80,526 |
| Gillette, WY μSA | 48,145 | Campbell County, Wyoming | 48,145 |
| Rock Springs, WY μSA | 41,267 | Sweetwater County, Wyoming | 41,267 |
| Riverton, WY μSA | 39,464 | Fremont County, Wyoming | 39,464 |
| Laramie, WY μSA | 38,558 | Albany County, Wyoming | 38,558 |
| Sheridan, WY μSA | 33,241 | Sheridan County, Wyoming | 33,241 |
| Cody, WY μSA | 31,171 | Park County, Wyoming | 31,171 |
| Jackson, WY-ID μSA | 36,587; 23,333 (WY) | Teton County, Wyoming | 23,333 |
| Jackson, WY-ID μSA | 36,587; 23,333 (WY) | Teton County, Idaho | 13,254 |
| Evanston, WY-UT μSA | 23,415; 20,728 (WY) | Uinta County, Wyoming | 20,728 |
| Evanston, WY-UT μSA | 23,415; 20,728 (WY) | Rich County, Utah | 2,687 |
| none | | Lincoln County, Wyoming | 21,180 |
| none | | Carbon County, Wyoming | 14,013 |
| none | | Converse County, Wyoming | 13,824 |
| none | | Goshen County, Wyoming | 12,640 |
| none | | Big Horn County, Wyoming | 12,024 |
| none | | Sublette County, Wyoming | 8,929 |
| none | | Johnson County, Wyoming | 8,908 |
| none | | Platte County, Wyoming | 8,634 |
| none | | Crook County, Wyoming | 7,852 |
| none | | Washakie County, Wyoming | 7,597 |
| none | | Weston County, Wyoming | 6,840 |
| none | | Hot Springs County, Wyoming | 4,600 |
| none | | Niobrara County, Wyoming | 2,341 |
| State of Wyoming | | | 588,753 |

The ten core-based statistical areas of the State of Wyoming (Note: For PSAs comprising populations from multiple states, they are listed twice to show both their intrastate population within that PSA as well as the PSA's total population. Only the intrastate population is ranked.)
| 2025 rank | Primary statistical area | Population | | | | |
| 2025 rank | Primary statistical area | 2025 estimate | Change | 2020 Census | Change | 2010 Census |
|---|---|---|---|---|---|---|
| 1 | Cheyenne, WY MSA | 102,938 | +2.41% | 100,512 | +9.56% | 91,738 |
| 2 | Casper, WY MSA | 80,526 | +0.71% | 79,955 | +5.97% | 75,450 |
| 3 | Gillette, WY μSA | 48,145 | +2.38% | 47,026 | +1.94% | 46,133 |
| 4 | Rock Springs, WY μSA | 41,267 | −2.38% | 42,272 | −3.50% | 43,806 |
| 5 | Riverton, WY μSA | 39,464 | +0.59% | 39,234 | −2.22% | 40,123 |
| 6 | Laramie, WY μSA | 38,558 | +4.03% | 37,066 | +2.11% | 36,299 |
| 7 | Sheridan, WY μSA | 33,241 | +7.50% | 30,921 | +6.20% | 29,116 |
| 8 | Cody, WY μSA | 31,171 | +5.22% | 29,624 | +5.03% | 28,205 |
| 9 | Jackson, WY-ID μSA (WY) | 23,333 | +0.01% | 23,331 | +9.57% | 21,294 |
| 10 | Evanston, WY-UT μSA (WY) | 20,728 | +1.36% | 20,450 | −3.16% | 21,118 |
| | Evanston, WY-UT μSA | 23,415 | +1.98% | 22,960 | −1.80% | 23,382 |
| | Jackson, WY-ID μSA | 36,587 | +4.65% | 34,961 | +11.11% | 31,464 |

== See also ==
- Geography of Wyoming
  - Demographics of Wyoming
