= California statistical areas =

Coordinates: 37.1841°N 119.4696°W

The U.S. State of California currently has 42 statistical areas that have been delineated by the federal Office of Management and Budget (OMB).

On July 21, 2023, the OMB delineated seven combined statistical areas, 25 metropolitan statistical areas, and ten micropolitan statistical areas in California. As of 2023, the largest of these in the state is the Los Angeles-Long Beach, CA CSA, encompassing greater Los Angeles.

== Statistical areas ==
The Office of Management and Budget (OMB) has designated more than 1,000 statistical areas for the United States and Puerto Rico. These statistical areas are important geographic delineations of population clusters used by the OMB, the United States Census Bureau, planning organizations, and federal, state, and local government entities.

The OMB defines a core-based statistical area (commonly referred to as a CBSA) as the county or counties (or county-equivalents) surrounding at least one densely-settled core of at least 10,000 population, "plus adjacent counties having a high degree of social and economic integration with the core as measured through commuting ties with the counties containing the core". The OMB further divides core-based statistical areas based on population into metropolitan statistical areas (MSAs) for those with at least 50,000 and micropolitan statistical areas (μSAs) for those with 10,000 to 49,999 people.

The OMB defines a combined statistical area (CSA) as two or more adjacent core-based statistical areas where the employment interchange rate (% commuting from A to B plus % commuting from B to A) is at least 15%. The primary statistical areas (PSAs) include all combined statistical areas and any core-based statistical area that is not a constituent of a combined statistical area.

The 42 United States statistical areas and 58 counties of the State of California (Note: An out-of-state area and its population are displayed in green. An area that extends into more than one state is displayed in purple. A purple population number over a black population number show the total population versus the in-state population. The state's abbreviation is also shown next to the in-state total.)
Combined statistical area	2025 population (est.)	Core-based statistical area	2025 population (est.)	County	2025 population (est.)	Metropolitan division	2025 population (est.)
Los Angeles–Long Beach, CA CSA	18,444,299	Los Angeles–Long Beach–Anaheim, CA MSA	12,844,441	Los Angeles County, California	9,694,934	Los Angeles-Long Beach-Glendale, CA MD	9,694,934
Los Angeles–Long Beach, CA CSA	18,444,299	Los Angeles–Long Beach–Anaheim, CA MSA	12,844,441	Orange County, California	3,149,507	Anaheim-Santa Ana-Irvine, CA MD	3,149,507
Los Angeles–Long Beach, CA CSA	18,444,299	Riverside–San Bernardino–Ontario, CA MSA	4,769,007	Riverside County, California	2,544,916	none	
Los Angeles–Long Beach, CA CSA	18,444,299	Riverside–San Bernardino–Ontario, CA MSA	4,769,007	San Bernardino County, California	2,224,091	none	
Los Angeles–Long Beach, CA CSA	18,444,299	Oxnard-Thousand Oaks-Ventura, CA MSA	829,590	Ventura County, California	829,590	none	
San Jose-San Francisco-Oakland, CA CSA	9,140,485	San Francisco–Oakland–Fremont, CA MSA	4,630,041	Alameda County, California	1,636,630	Oakland-Fremont-Berkeley, CA MD	2,806,700
San Jose-San Francisco-Oakland, CA CSA	9,140,485	San Francisco–Oakland–Fremont, CA MSA	4,630,041	Contra Costa County, California	1,170,070	Oakland-Fremont-Berkeley, CA MD	2,806,700
San Jose-San Francisco-Oakland, CA CSA	9,140,485	San Francisco–Oakland–Fremont, CA MSA	4,630,041	San Francisco County, California	826,079	San Francisco-San Mateo-Redwood City, CA MD	1,569,647
San Jose-San Francisco-Oakland, CA CSA	9,140,485	San Francisco–Oakland–Fremont, CA MSA	4,630,041	San Mateo County, California	743,568	San Francisco-San Mateo-Redwood City, CA MD	1,569,647
San Jose-San Francisco-Oakland, CA CSA	9,140,485	San Francisco–Oakland–Fremont, CA MSA	4,630,041	Marin County, California	253,694	San Rafael, CA MD	253,694
San Jose-San Francisco-Oakland, CA CSA	9,140,485	San Jose-Sunnyvale-Santa Clara, CA MSA	1,984,473	Santa Clara County, California	1,914,391	none	
San Jose-San Francisco-Oakland, CA CSA	9,140,485	San Jose-Sunnyvale-Santa Clara, CA MSA	1,984,473	San Benito County, California	70,082	none	
San Jose-San Francisco-Oakland, CA CSA	9,140,485	Stockton, CA MSA	823,815	San Joaquin County, California	823,815	none	
San Jose-San Francisco-Oakland, CA CSA	9,140,485	Modesto, CA MSA	557,719	Stanislaus County, California	557,719	none	
San Jose-San Francisco-Oakland, CA CSA	9,140,485	Vallejo, CA MSA	449,218	Solano County, California	449,218	none	
San Jose-San Francisco-Oakland, CA CSA	9,140,485	Merced, CA MSA	297,260	Merced County, California	297,260	none	
San Jose-San Francisco-Oakland, CA CSA	9,140,485	Santa Cruz-Watsonville, CA MSA	258,852	Santa Cruz County, California	258,852	none	
San Jose-San Francisco-Oakland, CA CSA	9,140,485	Napa, CA MSA	132,949	Napa County, California	132,949	none	
none		San Diego-Chula Vista-Carlsbad, CA MSA	3,282,248	San Diego County, California	3,282,248	none	
Sacramento-Roseville, CA CSA	2,766,663	Sacramento-Roseville-Folsom, CA MSA	2,477,274	Sacramento County, California	1,618,460	none	
Sacramento-Roseville, CA CSA	2,766,663	Sacramento-Roseville-Folsom, CA MSA	2,477,274	Placer County, California	442,081	none	
Sacramento-Roseville, CA CSA	2,766,663	Sacramento-Roseville-Folsom, CA MSA	2,477,274	Yolo County, California	224,410	none	
Sacramento-Roseville, CA CSA	2,766,663	Sacramento-Roseville-Folsom, CA MSA	2,477,274	El Dorado County, California	192,323	none	
Sacramento-Roseville, CA CSA	2,766,663	Yuba City, CA MSA	187,478	Sutter County, California	98,787	none	
Sacramento-Roseville, CA CSA	2,766,663	Yuba City, CA MSA	187,478	Yuba County, California	88,691	none	
Sacramento-Roseville, CA CSA	2,766,663	Truckee-Grass Valley, CA μSA	101,911	Nevada County, California	101,911	none	
Fresno-Hanford–Corcoran, CA CSA	1,357,710	Fresno, CA MSA	1,203,383	Fresno County, California	1,035,456	none	
Fresno-Hanford–Corcoran, CA CSA	1,357,710	Fresno, CA MSA	1,203,383	Madera County, California	167,927	none	
Fresno-Hanford–Corcoran, CA CSA	1,357,710	Hanford-Corcoran, CA MSA	154,327	Kings County, California	154,327	none	
none		Bakersfield-Delano, CA MSA	927,068	Kern County, California	927,068	none	
none		Santa Rosa-Petaluma, CA MSA	486,444	Sonoma County, California	486,444	none	
none		Visalia, CA MSA	485,146	Tulare County, California	485,146	none	
none		Santa Maria-Santa Barbara, CA MSA	442,065	Santa Barbara County, California	442,065	none	
none		Salinas, CA MSA	433,729	Monterey County, California	433,729	none	
none		San Luis Obispo-Paso Robles, CA MSA	282,367	San Luis Obispo County, California	282,367	none	
Redding-Red Bluff, CA CSA	246,313	Redding, CA MSA	181,648	Shasta County, California	181,648	none	
Redding-Red Bluff, CA CSA	246,313	Red Bluff, CA μSA	64,665	Tehama County, California	64,665	none	
none		Chico, CA MSA	209,211	Butte County, California	209,211	none	
none		El Centro, CA MSA	181,411	Imperial County, California	181,411	none	
none		Eureka-Arcata, CA μSA	131,647	Humboldt County, California	131,647	none	
none		Ukiah, CA μSA	88,122	Mendocino County, California	88,122	none	
none		Clearlake, CA μSA	67,772	Lake County, California	67,772	none	
none		Sonora, CA μSA	53,160	Tuolumne County, California	53,160	none	
none		Susanville, CA μSA	28,117	Lassen County, California	28,117	none	
Brookings-Crescent City, OR-CA CSA	49,031; 26,410(CA)	Crescent City, CA μSA	26,410	Del Norte County, California	26,410	none	
Brookings-Crescent City, OR-CA CSA	49,031; 26,410(CA)	Brookings, OR μSA	23,296	Curry County, Oregon	22,364	none	
none		Bishop, CA μSA	18,158	Inyo County, California	18,158	none	
Reno-Carson City-Gardnerville Ranchos, NV-CA CSA	714,310; 1,043(CA)	Reno, NV MSA	564,782	Washoe County, Nevada	498,022	none	
Reno-Carson City-Gardnerville Ranchos, NV-CA CSA	714,310; 1,043(CA)	Reno, NV MSA	564,782	Lyon County, Nevada	62,583	none	
Reno-Carson City-Gardnerville Ranchos, NV-CA CSA	714,310; 1,043(CA)	Reno, NV MSA	564,782	Storey County, Nevada	4,177	none	
Reno-Carson City-Gardnerville Ranchos, NV-CA CSA	714,310; 1,043(CA)	Carson City, NV MSA	58,036	Carson City, Nevada	58,036	none	
Reno-Carson City-Gardnerville Ranchos, NV-CA CSA	714,310; 1,043(CA)	Gardnerville Ranchos, NV-CA μSA	50,686; 1,141 (CA)	Douglas County, Nevada	49,545	none	
Reno-Carson City-Gardnerville Ranchos, NV-CA CSA	714,310; 1,043(CA)	Gardnerville Ranchos, NV-CA μSA	50,686; 1,141 (CA)	Alpine County, California	1,043	none	
Reno-Carson City-Gardnerville Ranchos, NV-CA CSA	714,310; 1,043(CA)	Fallon, NV μSA	25,803	Churchill County, Nevada	25,803	none	
none				Calaveras County, California	46,605	none	
none				Siskiyou County, California	42,013	none	
none				Amador County, California	41,876	none	
none				Glenn County, California	28,141	none	
none				Colusa County, California	21,836	none	
none				Plumas County, California	18,583	none	
none				Mariposa County, California	16,918	none	
none				Trinity County, California	15,720	none	
none				Mono County, California	12,505	none	
none				Modoc County, California	8,426	none	
none				Sierra County, California	3,098	none	
State of California					39,347,890	none	

The 35 core-based statistical areas of the State of California (Note: For CBSAs comprising populations from multiple states, they are listed twice to show both their intrastate population within that CBSA as well as the CBSA's total population. Only the intrastate population is ranked.)
2025 rank	Core-based statistical area	Population				
2025 rank	Core-based statistical area	2025 estimate	Change	2020 Census	Change	2010 Census
1	Los Angeles-Long Beach-Anaheim, CA MSA	12,844,441	−2.70%	13,200,998	+2.90%	12,828,837
2	Riverside-San Bernardino-Ontario, CA MSA	4,769,007	+3.68%	4,599,839	+8.88%	4,224,851
3	San Francisco-Oakland-Fremont, CA MSA	4,630,041	−2.51%	4,749,008	+9.54%	4,335,391
4	San Diego-Chula Vista-Carlsbad, CA MSA	3,282,248	−0.50%	3,298,634	+6.57%	3,095,313
5	Sacramento-Roseville-Folsom, CA MSA	2,477,274	+3.33%	2,397,382	+11.55%	2,149,127
6	San Jose-Sunnyvale-Santa Clara, CA MSA	1,984,473	−0.80%	2,000,468	+8.90%	1,836,911
7	Fresno, CA MSA	1,203,383	+3.30%	1,164,909	+7.73%	1,081,315
8	Bakersfield-Delano, CA MSA	927,068	+1.96%	909,235	+8.29%	839,631
9	Oxnard-Thousand Oaks-Ventura, CA MSA	830,851	−1.54%	843,843	+2.49%	823,318
10	Stockton, CA MSA	823,815	+5.72%	779,233	+13.71%	685,306
11	Modesto, CA MSA	557,719	+0.88%	552,878	+7.47%	514,453
12	Santa Rosa-Petaluma, CA MSA	486,444	−0.49%	488,863	+1.03%	483,878
13	Visalia, CA MSA	485,146	+2.54%	473,117	+7.00%	442,179
14	Vallejo, CA MSA	455,376	+0.42%	453,491	+9.71%	413,344
15	Santa Maria-Santa Barbara, CA MSA	442,065	−1.38%	448,229	+5.74%	423,895
16	Salinas, CA MSA	433,729	−1.21%	439,035	+5.78%	415,057
17	Merced, CA MSA	297,260	+5.71%	281,202	+9.93%	255,793
18	San Luis Obispo-Paso Robles, CA MSA	282,367	−0.02%	282,424	+4.74%	269,637
19	Santa Cruz-Watsonville, CA MSA	258,852	−4.43%	270,861	+3.23%	262,382
20	Chico, CA MSA	209,211	−1.14%	211,632	−3.80%	220,000
21	Yuba City, CA MSA	187,478	+3.46%	181,208	+8.58%	166,892
22	Redding, CA MSA	181,648	−0.28%	182,155	+2.78%	177,223
23	El Centro, CA MSA	181,411	+0.95%	179,702	+2.96%	174,528
24	Hanford-Corcoran, CA MSA	154,327	+1.21%	152,486	−0.32%	152,982
25	Eureka-Arcata, CA μSA	131,647	−3.53%	136,463	+1.37%	134,623
26	Napa, CA MSA	132,949	−3.67%	138,019	+1.12%	136,484
27	Truckee-Grass Valley, CA μSA	101,911	−0.32%	102,241	+3.52%	98,764
28	Ukiah, CA μSA	88,122	−3.80%	91,601	+4.28%	87,841
29	Clearlake, CA μSA	67,772	−0.57%	68,163	+5.41%	64,665
30	Red Bluff, CA μSA	64,665	−1.77%	65,829	+3.73%	63,463
31	Sonora, CA μSA	53,160	−4.42%	55,620	+0.46%	55,365
32	Susanville, CA μSA	28,117	−14.09%	32,730	−6.20%	34,895
33	Crescent City, CA μSA	26,410	−4.80%	27,743	−3.03%	28,610
34	Bishop, CA μSA	18,158	−4.51%	19,016	+2.53%	18,546
35	Gardnerville Ranchos, NV-CA μSA (CA)	1,043	−13.37%	1,204	+2.47%	1,175
	Gardnerville Ranchos, NV-CA μSA	51,154	+0.91%	50,692	+5.23%	48,172

The seven combined statistical areas of the State of California (Note: For CSAs comprising populations from multiple states, they are listed twice to show both their intrastate population within that CSA as well as the CSA's total population. Only the intrastate population is ranked.)
2025 rank	Combined statistical area	Population				
2025 rank	Combined statistical area	2025 estimate	Change	2020 Census	Change	2010 Census
1	Los Angeles-Long Beach, CA CSA	18,444,299	−1.07%	18,644,680	+4.29%	17,877,006
2	San Jose-San Francisco-Oakland, CA CSA	9,140,485	−0.92%	9,225,160	+9.30%	8,440,064
3	Sacramento-Roseville, CA CSA	2,766,663	+3.20%	2,680,831	+11.02%	2,414,783
4	Fresno-Hanford-Corcoran, CA CSA	1,357,710	+3.06%	1,317,395	+6.73%	1,234,297
5	Redding-Red Bluff, CA CSA	246,313	−0.67%	247,984	+3.03%	240,686
6	Brookings-Crescent City, OR-CA CSA (CA)	26,410	−4.80%	27,743	−3.03%	28,610
7	Reno-Carson City-Gardnerville Ranchos, NV-CA CSA (CA)	1,043	−13.37%	1,204	+2.47%	1,175
	Brookings-Crescent City, OR-CA CSA	49,031	−4.22%	51,189	+0.42%	50,974
	Reno-Carson City-Gardnerville Ranchos, NV-CA CSA	714,310	+4.33%	684,678	+13.04%	605,720

== See also ==
- Geography of California
  - Demographics of California
