= Hawaii statistical areas =

Coordinates: 20.2927°N 156.3737°W

The U.S. State of Hawaiʻi currently has four statistical areas that have been delineated by the Office of Management and Budget (OMB). On July 21, 2023, the OMB delineated two metropolitan statistical areas and two micropolitan statistical areas in Hawaiʻi. As of 2025, the most populous of these is the Urban Honolulu, HI MSA, anchored by Hawaiʻi's capital and largest city, Honolulu, on the island of Oahu.

== Statistical areas ==
The Office of Management and Budget (OMB) has designated more than 1,000 statistical areas for the United States and Puerto Rico. These statistical areas are important geographic delineations of population clusters used by the OMB, the United States Census Bureau, planning organizations, and federal, state, and local government entities.

The OMB defines a core-based statistical area (commonly referred to as a CBSA) as the county or counties (or county-equivalents) surrounding at least one densely-settled core of at least 10,000 population, "plus adjacent counties having a high degree of social and economic integration with the core as measured through commuting ties with the counties containing the core". The OMB further divides core-based statistical areas based on population into metropolitan statistical areas (MSAs) for those with at least 50,000 and micropolitan statistical areas (μSAs) for those with 10,000 to 49,999 people.

The OMB defines a combined statistical area (CSA) as two or more adjacent core-based statistical areas where the employment interchange rate (% commuting from A to B plus % commuting from B to A) is at least 15%. The primary statistical areas (PSAs) include all combined statistical areas and any core-based statistical area that is not a constituent of a combined statistical area.

The four United States statistical areas and five counties of the State of Hawaiʻi
Core-based statistical area	2025 population (est.)	County-equivalent	2025 population (est.)
Urban Honolulu, HI MSA	988,703	City and County of Honolulu	988,703
Hilo–Kailua, HI μSA	210,043	Hawaii County	210,043
Kahului–Wailuku, HI MSA	160,674	Maui County	160,592
Kahului–Wailuku, HI MSA	160,674	Kalawao County	82
Kapaa, HI μSA	73,400	Kauaʻi County	73,400
State of Hawaiʻi			1,432,820

The four core-based statistical areas of the State of Hawaiʻi
2025 rank	Core-based statistical area	Population				
2025 rank	Core-based statistical area	2025 estimate	Change	2020 Census	Change	2010 Census
1	Urban Honolulu, HI MSA	988,703	−2.74%	1,016,508	+6.64%	953,207
2	Hilo–Kailua, HI μSA	210,043	+4.69%	200,629	+8.40%	185,079
3	Kahului–Wailuku, HI MSA	160,674	−2.52%	164,836	+6.40%	154,924
4	Kapaa, HI μSA	73,400	+0.14%	73,298	+9.25%	67,091

== See also ==
- Geography of Hawaii
  - Demographics of Hawaii
