= New York statistical areas =

Coordinates: 42.9538°N 75.5268°W

The U.S. state of New York currently has 34 statistical areas that have been delineated by the Office of Management and Budget (OMB). On July 21, 2023, the OMB delineated seven combined statistical areas, 13 metropolitan statistical areas and 14 micropolitan statistical areas in New York. As of 2023, the largest of these is the New York-Newark, NY-NJ-CT-PA CSA, which includes New York City and its surrounding suburbs; with over 21 million people, it is the largest primary statistical area in the United States.

== Statistical areas ==
The Office of Management and Budget (OMB) has designated more than 1,000 statistical areas for the United States and Puerto Rico. These statistical areas are important geographic delineations of population clusters used by the OMB, the United States Census Bureau, planning organizations, and federal, state, and local government entities.

The OMB defines a core-based statistical area (commonly referred to as a CBSA) as the county or counties (or county-equivalents) surrounding at least one densely-settled core of at least 10,000 population, "plus adjacent counties having a high degree of social and economic integration with the core as measured through commuting ties with the counties containing the core". The OMB further divides core-based statistical areas based on population into metropolitan statistical areas (MSAs) for those with at least 50,000 and micropolitan statistical areas (μSAs) for those with 10,000 to 49,999 people.

The OMB defines a combined statistical area (CSA) as two or more adjacent core-based statistical areas where the employment interchange rate (% commuting from A to B plus % commuting from B to A) is at least 15%. The primary statistical areas (PSAs) include all combined statistical areas and any core-based statistical area that is not a constituent of a combined statistical area.

The 34 United States statistical areas and 62 counties of the State of New York (Note: An out-of-state area and its population are displayed in green. An area that extends into more than one state is displayed in purple. A purple population number over a black population number show the total population versus the in-state population. The state's abbreviation is also shown next to the in-state total.)
Combined statistical area	2025 population (est.)	Core-based statistical area	2025 population (est.)	County-equivalent	2025 population (est.)	Metropolitan division	2025 population (est.)
New York-Newark, NY-NJ-CT-PA CSA	22,535,017; 13,984,119(NY)	New York-Newark-Jersey City, NY-NJ MSA	20,112,448; 13,001,826(NY)	Kings County, New York	2,653,963	New York-Jersey City-White Plains, NY-NJ MD	12,300,480; 10,056,797 (NY)
New York-Newark, NY-NJ-CT-PA CSA	22,535,017; 13,984,119(NY)	New York-Newark-Jersey City, NY-NJ MSA	20,112,448; 13,001,826(NY)	Queens County, New York	2,358,182	New York-Jersey City-White Plains, NY-NJ MD	12,300,480; 10,056,797 (NY)
New York-Newark, NY-NJ-CT-PA CSA	22,535,017; 13,984,119(NY)	New York-Newark-Jersey City, NY-NJ MSA	20,112,448; 13,001,826(NY)	New York County, New York	1,664,862	New York-Jersey City-White Plains, NY-NJ MD	12,300,480; 10,056,797 (NY)
New York-Newark, NY-NJ-CT-PA CSA	22,535,017; 13,984,119(NY)	New York-Newark-Jersey City, NY-NJ MSA	20,112,448; 13,001,826(NY)	Bronx County, New York	1,406,332	New York-Jersey City-White Plains, NY-NJ MD	12,300,480; 10,056,797 (NY)
New York-Newark, NY-NJ-CT-PA CSA	22,535,017; 13,984,119(NY)	New York-Newark-Jersey City, NY-NJ MSA	20,112,448; 13,001,826(NY)	Westchester County, New York	1,015,743	New York-Jersey City-White Plains, NY-NJ MD	12,300,480; 10,056,797 (NY)
New York-Newark, NY-NJ-CT-PA CSA	22,535,017; 13,984,119(NY)	New York-Newark-Jersey City, NY-NJ MSA	20,112,448; 13,001,826(NY)	Bergen County, New Jersey	977,026	New York-Jersey City-White Plains, NY-NJ MD	12,300,480; 10,056,797 (NY)
New York-Newark, NY-NJ-CT-PA CSA	22,535,017; 13,984,119(NY)	New York-Newark-Jersey City, NY-NJ MSA	20,112,448; 13,001,826(NY)	Hudson County, New Jersey	735,033	New York-Jersey City-White Plains, NY-NJ MD	12,300,480; 10,056,797 (NY)
New York-Newark, NY-NJ-CT-PA CSA	22,535,017; 13,984,119(NY)	New York-Newark-Jersey City, NY-NJ MSA	20,112,448; 13,001,826(NY)	Passaic County, New Jersey	531,624	New York-Jersey City-White Plains, NY-NJ MD	12,300,480; 10,056,797 (NY)
New York-Newark, NY-NJ-CT-PA CSA	22,535,017; 13,984,119(NY)	New York-Newark-Jersey City, NY-NJ MSA	20,112,448; 13,001,826(NY)	Richmond County, New York	501,290	New York-Jersey City-White Plains, NY-NJ MD	12,300,480; 10,056,797 (NY)
New York-Newark, NY-NJ-CT-PA CSA	22,535,017; 13,984,119(NY)	New York-Newark-Jersey City, NY-NJ MSA	20,112,448; 13,001,826(NY)	Rockland County, New York	357,397	New York-Jersey City-White Plains, NY-NJ MD	12,300,480; 10,056,797 (NY)
New York-Newark, NY-NJ-CT-PA CSA	22,535,017; 13,984,119(NY)	New York-Newark-Jersey City, NY-NJ MSA	20,112,448; 13,001,826(NY)	Putnam County, New York	99,028	New York-Jersey City-White Plains, NY-NJ MD	12,300,480; 10,056,797 (NY)
New York-Newark, NY-NJ-CT-PA CSA	22,535,017; 13,984,119(NY)	New York-Newark-Jersey City, NY-NJ MSA	20,112,448; 13,001,826(NY)	Suffolk County, New York	1,546,090	Nassau County-Suffolk County, NY MD	2,945,029
New York-Newark, NY-NJ-CT-PA CSA	22,535,017; 13,984,119(NY)	New York-Newark-Jersey City, NY-NJ MSA	20,112,448; 13,001,826(NY)	Nassau County, New York	1,398,939	Nassau County-Suffolk County, NY MD	2,945,029
New York-Newark, NY-NJ-CT-PA CSA	22,535,017; 13,984,119(NY)	New York-Newark-Jersey City, NY-NJ MSA	20,112,448; 13,001,826(NY)	Middlesex County, New Jersey	883,335	New Brunswick-Lakewood, NJ MD	2,564,602
New York-Newark, NY-NJ-CT-PA CSA	22,535,017; 13,984,119(NY)	New York-Newark-Jersey City, NY-NJ MSA	20,112,448; 13,001,826(NY)	Ocean County, New Jersey	673,746	New Brunswick-Lakewood, NJ MD	2,564,602
New York-Newark, NY-NJ-CT-PA CSA	22,535,017; 13,984,119(NY)	New York-Newark-Jersey City, NY-NJ MSA	20,112,448; 13,001,826(NY)	Monmouth County, New Jersey	651,035	New Brunswick-Lakewood, NJ MD	2,564,602
New York-Newark, NY-NJ-CT-PA CSA	22,535,017; 13,984,119(NY)	New York-Newark-Jersey City, NY-NJ MSA	20,112,448; 13,001,826(NY)	Somerset County, New Jersey	356,486	New Brunswick-Lakewood, NJ MD	2,564,602
New York-Newark, NY-NJ-CT-PA CSA	22,535,017; 13,984,119(NY)	New York-Newark-Jersey City, NY-NJ MSA	20,112,448; 13,001,826(NY)	Essex County, New Jersey	896,379	Newark, NJ MD	2,302,337
New York-Newark, NY-NJ-CT-PA CSA	22,535,017; 13,984,119(NY)	New York-Newark-Jersey City, NY-NJ MSA	20,112,448; 13,001,826(NY)	Union County, New Jersey	601,863	Newark, NJ MD	2,302,337
New York-Newark, NY-NJ-CT-PA CSA	22,535,017; 13,984,119(NY)	New York-Newark-Jersey City, NY-NJ MSA	20,112,448; 13,001,826(NY)	Morris County, New Jersey	524,251	Newark, NJ MD	2,302,337
New York-Newark, NY-NJ-CT-PA CSA	22,535,017; 13,984,119(NY)	New York-Newark-Jersey City, NY-NJ MSA	20,112,448; 13,001,826(NY)	Sussex County, New Jersey	148,063	Newark, NJ MD	2,302,337
New York-Newark, NY-NJ-CT-PA CSA	22,535,017; 13,984,119(NY)	New York-Newark-Jersey City, NY-NJ MSA	20,112,448; 13,001,826(NY)	Hunterdon County, New Jersey	131,781	Newark, NJ MD	2,302,337
New York-Newark, NY-NJ-CT-PA CSA	22,535,017; 13,984,119(NY)	Bridgeport-Stamford-Danbury, CT MSA	951,558	Western Connecticut Planning Region, Connecticut	640,482	none	
New York-Newark, NY-NJ-CT-PA CSA	22,535,017; 13,984,119(NY)	Bridgeport-Stamford-Danbury, CT MSA	951,558	Greater Bridgeport Planning Region, Connecticut	337,697	none	
New York-Newark, NY-NJ-CT-PA CSA	22,535,017; 13,984,119(NY)	Kiryas Joel-Poughkeepsie-Newburgh, NY MSA	718,377	Orange County, New York	417,669	none	
New York-Newark, NY-NJ-CT-PA CSA	22,535,017; 13,984,119(NY)	Kiryas Joel-Poughkeepsie-Newburgh, NY MSA	718,377	Dutchess County, New York	300,708	none	
New York-Newark, NY-NJ-CT-PA CSA	22,535,017; 13,984,119(NY)	Trenton-Princeton, NJ MSA	399,289	Mercer County, New Jersey	399,289	none	
New York-Newark, NY-NJ-CT-PA CSA	22,535,017; 13,984,119(NY)	Kingston, NY MSA	183,330	Ulster County, New York	183,330	none	
New York-Newark, NY-NJ-CT-PA CSA	22,535,017; 13,984,119(NY)	Monticello, NY μSA	80,586	Sullivan County, New York	80,586	none	
New York-Newark, NY-NJ-CT-PA CSA	22,535,017; 13,984,119(NY)	Hemlock Farms, PA μSA	62,808	Pike County, Pennsylvania	62,808	none	
Buffalo-Cheektowaga-Olean, NY CSA	1,231,043	Buffalo-Cheektowaga, NY MSA	1,155,653	Erie County, New York	946,741	none	
Buffalo-Cheektowaga-Olean, NY CSA	1,231,043	Buffalo-Cheektowaga, NY MSA	1,155,653	Niagara County, New York	208,912	none	
Buffalo-Cheektowaga-Olean, NY CSA	1,231,043	Olean, NY μSA	75,390	Cattaraugus County, New York	75,390	none	
Albany-Schenectady, NY CSA	1,202,638	Albany-Schenectady-Troy, NY MSA	915,835	Albany County, New York	321,225	none	
Albany-Schenectady, NY CSA	1,202,638	Albany-Schenectady-Troy, NY MSA	915,835	Saratoga County, New York	241,343	none	
Albany-Schenectady, NY CSA	1,202,638	Albany-Schenectady-Troy, NY MSA	915,835	Schenectady County, New York	162,581	none	
Albany-Schenectady, NY CSA	1,202,638	Albany-Schenectady-Troy, NY MSA	915,835	Rensselaer County, New York	160,510	none	
Albany-Schenectady, NY CSA	1,202,638	Albany-Schenectady-Troy, NY MSA	915,835	Schoharie County, New York	30,176	none	
Albany-Schenectady, NY CSA	1,202,638	Glens Falls, NY MSA	124,373	Warren County, New York	65,020	none	
Albany-Schenectady, NY CSA	1,202,638	Glens Falls, NY MSA	124,373	Washington County, New York	59,353	none	
Albany-Schenectady, NY CSA	1,202,638	Hudson, NY μSA	60,168	Columbia County, New York	60,168	none	
Albany-Schenectady, NY CSA	1,202,638	Gloversville, NY μSA	52,216	Fulton County, New York	52,216	none	
Albany-Schenectady, NY CSA	1,202,638	Amsterdam, NY μSA	50,046	Montgomery County, New York	50,046	none	
Rochester-Batavia-Seneca Falls, NY CSA	1,147,448	Rochester, NY MSA	1,056,149	Monroe County, New York	750,506	none	
Rochester-Batavia-Seneca Falls, NY CSA	1,147,448	Rochester, NY MSA	1,056,149	Ontario County, New York	113,130	none	
Rochester-Batavia-Seneca Falls, NY CSA	1,147,448	Rochester, NY MSA	1,056,149	Wayne County, New York	91,250	none	
Rochester-Batavia-Seneca Falls, NY CSA	1,147,448	Rochester, NY MSA	1,056,149	Livingston County, New York	61,438	none	
Rochester-Batavia-Seneca Falls, NY CSA	1,147,448	Rochester, NY MSA	1,056,149	Orleans County, New York	39,825	none	
Rochester-Batavia-Seneca Falls, NY CSA	1,147,448	Batavia, NY μSA	58,416	Genesee County, New York	58,416	none	
Rochester-Batavia-Seneca Falls, NY CSA	1,147,448	Seneca Falls, NY μSA	32,883	Seneca County, New York	32,883	none	
Syracuse-Auburn, NY CSA	726,638	Syracuse, NY MSA	652,273	Onondaga County, New York	466,584	none	
Syracuse-Auburn, NY CSA	726,638	Syracuse, NY MSA	652,273	Oswego County, New York	118,569	none	
Syracuse-Auburn, NY CSA	726,638	Syracuse, NY MSA	652,273	Madison County, New York	67,120	none	
Syracuse-Auburn, NY CSA	726,638	Auburn, NY μSA	74,365	Cayuga County, New York	74,365	none	
none		Utica-Rome, NY MSA	285,611	Oneida County, New York	226,392	none	
none		Utica-Rome, NY MSA	285,611	Herkimer County, New York	59,219	none	
none		Binghamton, NY MSA	243,189	Broome County, New York	195,736	none	
none		Binghamton, NY MSA	243,189	Tioga County, New York	47,453	none	
Elmira-Corning, NY CSA	172,270	Corning, NY μSA	91,855	Steuben County, New York	91,855	none	
Elmira-Corning, NY CSA	172,270	Elmira, NY MSA	80,415	Chemung County, New York	80,415	none	
Ithaca-Cortland, NY CSA	149,897	Ithaca, NY MSA	104,047	Tompkins County, New York	104,047	none	
Ithaca-Cortland, NY CSA	149,897	Cortland, NY μSA	45,850	Cortland County, New York	45,850	none	
none		Jamestown-Dunkirk, NY μSA	124,126	Chautauqua County, New York	124,126	none	
none		Watertown-Fort Drum, NY MSA	111,540	Jefferson County, New York	111,540	none	
none		Massena-Ogdensburg, NY μSA	105,488	St. Lawrence County, New York	105,488	none	
none		Plattsburgh, NY μSA	78,138	Clinton County, New York	78,138	none	
none		Oneonta, NY μSA	60,589	Otsego County, New York	60,589	none	
none		none		Greene County, New York	47,238	none	
none		none		Allegany County, New York	46,800	none	
none		none		Franklin County, New York	46,500	none	
none		none		Chenango County, New York	45,715	none	
none		none		Delaware County, New York	44,305	none	
none		none		Wyoming County, New York	39,741	none	
none		none		Essex County, New York	36,438	none	
none		none		Lewis County, New York	26,479	none	
none		none		Yates County, New York	24,547	none	
none		none		Schuyler County, New York	16,924	none	
none		none		Hamilton County, New York	5,006	none	
State of New York					20,002,427	none	

The 27 core-based statistical areas of the State of New York (Note: For CBSAs comprising populations from multiple states, they are listed twice to show both their intrastate population within that CBSA as well as the CBSA's total population. Only the intrastate population is ranked.)
2025 rank	Core-based statistical area	Population				
2025 rank	Core-based statistical area	2025 estimate	Change	2020 Census	Change	2010 Census
1	New York-Newark-Jersey City, NY-NJ MSA (NY)	13,001,826	−1.25%	13,165,938	+6.45%	12,368,525
2	Buffalo-Cheektowaga, NY MSA	1,155,653	−0.96%	1,166,902	+2.76%	1,135,509
3	Rochester, NY MSA	1,056,149	−0.86%	1,065,361	+1.05%	1,054,323
4	Albany-Schenectady-Troy, NY MSA	915,835	+1.84%	899,262	+3.28%	870,716
5	Kiryas Joel-Poughkeepsie-Newburgh, NY MSA	718,377	+3.03%	697,221	+4.02%	670,301
6	Syracuse, NY MSA	652,273	−1.48%	662,057	−0.08%	662,577
7	Utica-Rome, NY MSA	285,611	−2.28%	292,264	−2.38%	299,397
8	Binghamton, NY MSA	243,189	−1.60%	247,138	−1.82%	251,725
9	Kingston, NY MSA	183,330	+0.81%	181,851	−0.35%	182,493
10	Glens Falls, NY MSA	124,373	−2.57%	127,657	−5.37%	134,905
11	Jamestown-Dunkirk, NY μSA	124,126	−2.77%	127,657	−5.37%	134,905
12	Watertown-Fort Drum, NY MSA	111,540	−4.44%	116,721	+0.42%	116,229
13	Massena-Ogdensburg, NY μSA	105,488	−2.78%	108,505	−3.07%	111,944
14	Ithaca, NY MSA	104,047	−1.60%	105,740	+4.11%	101,564
15	Corning, NY μSA	91,855	−1.85%	93,584	−5.46%	98,990
16	Elmira, NY MSA	80,415	−4.44%	84,148	−5.27%	88,830
17	Monticello, NY μSA	80,586	+2.50%	78,624	+1.39%	77,547
18	Plattsburgh, NY μSA	78,138	−2.14%	79,843	−2.78%	82,128
19	Olean, NY μSA	75,390	−2.14%	77,042	−4.08%	80,317
20	Auburn, NY μSA	74,365	−2.47%	76,248	−4.72%	80,026
21	Hudson, NY μSA	60,168	−2.28%	61,570	−2.42%	63,096
22	Oneonta, NY μSA	60,589	+3.53%	58,524	−6.00%	62,259
23	Batavia, NY μSA	58,416	+0.05%	58,388	−2.81%	60,079
24	Gloversville, NY μSA	52,216	−2.08%	53,324	−3.97%	55,531
25	Amsterdam, NY μSA	50,046	+1.04%	49,532	−1.37%	50,219
26	Cortland, NY μSA	45,850	−2.05%	46,809	−5.12%	49,336
27	Seneca Falls, NY μSA	32,883	−2.75%	33,814	−4.08%	35,251
	New York-Newark-Jersey City, NY-NJ MSA	20,112,448	+0.15%	20,081,535	+6.59%	18,839,740

The seven combined statistical areas of the State of New York (Note: New York CSA's overall population is not listed due to lack of historic census data for Connecticut planning regions.)
2025 rank	Combined statistical area	Population				
2025 rank	Combined statistical area	2025 estimate	Change	2020 Census	Change	2010 Census
1	New York-Newark, NY-NJ-CT-PA CSA (NY)	13,984,119	−0.99%	14,123,634	+6.20%	13,298,866
2	Buffalo-Cheektowaga-Olean, NY CSA	1,231,043	−1.04%	1,243,944	+2.31%	1,215,826
3	Albany-Schenectady, NY CSA	1,202,638	+1.00%	1,190,727	+1.90%	1,168,485
4	Rochester-Batavia-Seneca Falls, NY CSA	1,147,448	−0.87%	1,157,563	+0.69%	1,149,653
5	Syracuse-Auburn, NY CSA	726,638	−1.58%	738,305	−0.58%	742,603
6	Elmira-Corning, NY CSA	172,270	−3.07%	177,732	−5.37%	187,820
7	Ithaca-Cortland, NY CSA	149,897	−1.74%	152,549	+1.09%	150,900

== See also ==
- Geography of New York (state)
  - Demographics of New York (state)
