= Washington statistical areas =

Washington statistical areas may refer to:

- Washington (state) statistical areas
- Washington, D.C., statistical areas
