= Kansas statistical areas =

Coordinates: 38.4937°N 98.3804°W

The U.S. State of Kansas currently has 25 statistical areas that have been delineated by the Office of Management and Budget (OMB). On July 21, 2023, the OMB delineated three combined statistical areas, seven metropolitan statistical areas, and 15 micropolitan statistical areas in Kansas. As of 2025, the largest of these is the Kansas City–Overland Park–Kansas City, MO-KS CSA, comprising the area around Kansas City, Missouri.

== Statistical areas ==
The Office of Management and Budget (OMB) has designated more than 1,000 statistical areas for the United States and Puerto Rico. These statistical areas are important geographic delineations of population clusters used by the OMB, the United States Census Bureau, planning organizations, and federal, state, and local government entities.

The OMB defines a core-based statistical area (CBSA) as the county or counties (or county-equivalents) surrounding at least one densely-settled core of at least 10,000 population, "plus adjacent counties having a high degree of social and economic integration with the core as measured through commuting ties with the counties containing the core". The OMB further divides a CBSA based on population into a metropolitan statistical area (MSA) for those with at least 50,000 people or a micropolitan statistical area (μSA) for those with 10,000 to 49,999 people.

The OMB defines a combined statistical area (CSA) as two or more adjacent CBSAs where the employment interchange rate (percent commuting from A to B plus percent commuting from B to A) is at least 15%. A primary statistical area (PSA) includes all CSAs and any CBSA that is not a constituent of a combined statistical area.

The 25 United States statistical areas and 105 counties of the State of Kansas (Note: An out-of-state area and its population are displayed in green. An area that extends into more than one state is displayed in purple. A purple population number over a black population number show the total population versus the in-state population. The state's abbreviation is also shown next to the in-state total.)
Combined statistical area	2025 population (est.)	Core-based statistical area	2025 population (est.)	County	2025 population (est.)
Kansas City–Overland Park–Kansas City, MO-KS CSA	2,609,823; 1,101,584 (KS)	Kansas City, MO-KS MSA	2,270,592; 938,193 (KS)	Jackson County, Missouri	732,994
Kansas City–Overland Park–Kansas City, MO-KS CSA	2,609,823; 1,101,584 (KS)	Kansas City, MO-KS MSA	2,270,592; 938,193 (KS)	Johnson County, Kansas	636,906
Kansas City–Overland Park–Kansas City, MO-KS CSA	2,609,823; 1,101,584 (KS)	Kansas City, MO-KS MSA	2,270,592; 938,193 (KS)	Clay County, Missouri	265,032
Kansas City–Overland Park–Kansas City, MO-KS CSA	2,609,823; 1,101,584 (KS)	Kansas City, MO-KS MSA	2,270,592; 938,193 (KS)	Wyandotte County, Kansas	170,597
Kansas City–Overland Park–Kansas City, MO-KS CSA	2,609,823; 1,101,584 (KS)	Kansas City, MO-KS MSA	2,270,592; 938,193 (KS)	Cass County, Missouri	115,859
Kansas City–Overland Park–Kansas City, MO-KS CSA	2,609,823; 1,101,584 (KS)	Kansas City, MO-KS MSA	2,270,592; 938,193 (KS)	Platte County, Missouri	114,400
Kansas City–Overland Park–Kansas City, MO-KS CSA	2,609,823; 1,101,584 (KS)	Kansas City, MO-KS MSA	2,270,592; 938,193 (KS)	Leavenworth County, Kansas	84,590
Kansas City–Overland Park–Kansas City, MO-KS CSA	2,609,823; 1,101,584 (KS)	Kansas City, MO-KS MSA	2,270,592; 938,193 (KS)	Miami County, Kansas	36,240
Kansas City–Overland Park–Kansas City, MO-KS CSA	2,609,823; 1,101,584 (KS)	Kansas City, MO-KS MSA	2,270,592; 938,193 (KS)	Lafayette County, Missouri	33,531
Kansas City–Overland Park–Kansas City, MO-KS CSA	2,609,823; 1,101,584 (KS)	Kansas City, MO-KS MSA	2,270,592; 938,193 (KS)	Ray County, Missouri	23,398
Kansas City–Overland Park–Kansas City, MO-KS CSA	2,609,823; 1,101,584 (KS)	Kansas City, MO-KS MSA	2,270,592; 938,193 (KS)	Clinton County, Missouri	21,661
Kansas City–Overland Park–Kansas City, MO-KS CSA	2,609,823; 1,101,584 (KS)	Kansas City, MO-KS MSA	2,270,592; 938,193 (KS)	Bates County, Missouri	16,512
Kansas City–Overland Park–Kansas City, MO-KS CSA	2,609,823; 1,101,584 (KS)	Kansas City, MO-KS MSA	2,270,592; 938,193 (KS)	Linn County, Kansas	9,860
Kansas City–Overland Park–Kansas City, MO-KS CSA	2,609,823; 1,101,584 (KS)	Kansas City, MO-KS MSA	2,270,592; 938,193 (KS)	Caldwell County, Missouri	9,012
Kansas City–Overland Park–Kansas City, MO-KS CSA	2,609,823; 1,101,584 (KS)	Lawrence, KS MSA	120,920	Douglas County, Kansas	120,920
Kansas City–Overland Park–Kansas City, MO-KS CSA	2,609,823; 1,101,584 (KS)	St. Joseph, MO-KS MSA	119,170; 7,594 (KS)	Buchanan County, Missouri	83,540
Kansas City–Overland Park–Kansas City, MO-KS CSA	2,609,823; 1,101,584 (KS)	St. Joseph, MO-KS MSA	119,170; 7,594 (KS)	Andrew County, Missouri	18,241
Kansas City–Overland Park–Kansas City, MO-KS CSA	2,609,823; 1,101,584 (KS)	St. Joseph, MO-KS MSA	119,170; 7,594 (KS)	DeKalb County, Missouri	9,795
Kansas City–Overland Park–Kansas City, MO-KS CSA	2,609,823; 1,101,584 (KS)	St. Joseph, MO-KS MSA	119,170; 7,594 (KS)	Doniphan County, Kansas	7,594
Kansas City–Overland Park–Kansas City, MO-KS CSA	2,609,823; 1,101,584 (KS)	Warrensburg, MO μSA	56,670	Johnson County, Missouri	56,670
Kansas City–Overland Park–Kansas City, MO-KS CSA	2,609,823; 1,101,584 (KS)	Ottawa, KS μSA	26,299	Franklin County, Kansas	26,299
Kansas City–Overland Park–Kansas City, MO-KS CSA	2,609,823; 1,101,584 (KS)	Atchison, KS μSA	16,172	Atchison County, Kansas	16,172
Wichita–Arkansas City–Winfield, KS CSA	698,191	Wichita, KS MSA	663,809	Sedgwick County, Kansas	538,433
Wichita–Arkansas City–Winfield, KS CSA	698,191	Wichita, KS MSA	663,809	Butler County, Kansas	69,484
Wichita–Arkansas City–Winfield, KS CSA	698,191	Wichita, KS MSA	663,809	Harvey County, Kansas	33,580
Wichita–Arkansas City–Winfield, KS CSA	698,191	Wichita, KS MSA	663,809	Sumner County, Kansas	22,312
Wichita–Arkansas City–Winfield, KS CSA	698,191	Arkansas City–Winfield, KS μSA	34,382	Cowley County, Kansas	34,382
none		Topeka, KS MSA	233,052	Shawnee County, Kansas	178,607
none		Topeka, KS MSA	233,052	Jefferson County, Kansas	18,296
none		Topeka, KS MSA	233,052	Osage County, Kansas	15,693
none		Topeka, KS MSA	233,052	Jackson County, Kansas	13,438
none		Topeka, KS MSA	233,052	Wabaunsee County, Kansas	7,018
none		Manhattan, KS MSA	136,122	Riley County, Kansas	72,598
none		Manhattan, KS MSA	136,122	Geary County, Kansas	36,338
none		Manhattan, KS MSA	136,122	Pottawatomie County, Kansas	27,186
none		Hutchinson, KS μSA	61,539	Reno County, Kansas	61,539
none		Salina, KS μSA	59,121	Saline County, Kansas	53,377
none		Salina, KS μSA	59,121	Ottawa County, Kansas	5,744
none		Pittsburg, KS μSA	39,008	Crawford County, Kansas	39,008
none		Garden City, KS μSA	37,505	Finney County, Kansas	37,505
none		Emporia, KS μSA	34,838	Lyon County, Kansas	32,266
none		Emporia, KS μSA	34,838	Chase County, Kansas	2,572
none		Dodge City, KS μSA	33,993	Ford County, Kansas	33,993
none		Coffeyville, KS μSA	30,177	Montgomery County, Kansas	30,177
none		McPherson, KS μSA	30,064	McPherson County, Kansas	30,064
none		Hays, KS μSA	29,075	Ellis County, Kansas	29,075
none		Great Bend, KS μSA	24,790	Barton County, Kansas	24,790
none		Liberal, KS μSA	21,073	Seward County, Kansas	21,073
none		Parsons, KS μSA	19,685	Labette County, Kansas	19,685
Joplin–Miami, MO-OK-KS CSA	239,234; 19,105 (KS)	Joplin, MO-KS MSA	208,796; 19,105 (KS)	Jasper County, Missouri	127,428
Joplin–Miami, MO-OK-KS CSA	239,234; 19,105 (KS)	Joplin, MO-KS MSA	208,796; 19,105 (KS)	Newton County, Missouri	62,263
Joplin–Miami, MO-OK-KS CSA	239,234; 19,105 (KS)	Joplin, MO-KS MSA	208,796; 19,105 (KS)	Cherokee County, Kansas	19,105
Joplin–Miami, MO-OK-KS CSA	239,234; 19,105 (KS)	Miami, OK μSA	30,438	Ottawa County, Oklahoma	30,438
none				Dickinson County, Kansas	18,637
none				Neosho County, Kansas	15,637
none				Bourbon County, Kansas	14,319
none				Allen County, Kansas	12,302
none				Marion County, Kansas	11,634
none				Nemaha County, Kansas	10,054
none				Marshall County, Kansas	9,852
none				Rice County, Kansas	9,266
none				Pratt County, Kansas	9,117
none				Brown County, Kansas	9,104
none				Cloud County, Kansas	8,833
none				Coffey County, Kansas	8,467
none				Wilson County, Kansas	8,299
none				Anderson County, Kansas	8,018
none				Clay County, Kansas	7,990
none				Thomas County, Kansas	7,725
none				Kingman County, Kansas	7,029
none				Grant County, Kansas	7,028
none				Russell County, Kansas	6,581
none				Ellsworth County, Kansas	6,257
none				Pawnee County, Kansas	5,991
none				Greenwood County, Kansas	5,826
none				Sherman County, Kansas	5,763
none				Gray County, Kansas	5,652
none				Mitchell County, Kansas	5,590
none				Washington County, Kansas	5,533
none				Harper County, Kansas	5,370
none				Morris County, Kansas	5,348
none				Norton County, Kansas	5,288
none				Stevens County, Kansas	4,984
none				Scott County, Kansas	4,815
none				Phillips County, Kansas	4,728
none				Rooks County, Kansas	4,646
none				Republic County, Kansas	4,640
none				Barber County, Kansas	4,083
none				Stafford County, Kansas	4,005
none				Kearny County, Kansas	3,888
none				Meade County, Kansas	3,852
none				Haskell County, Kansas	3,599
none				Smith County, Kansas	3,566
none				Chautauqua County, Kansas	3,321
none				Osborne County, Kansas	3,285
none				Woodson County, Kansas	3,118
none				Lincoln County, Kansas	2,861
none				Rush County, Kansas	2,845
none				Jewell County, Kansas	2,830
none				Trego County, Kansas	2,740
none				Decatur County, Kansas	2,716
none				Logan County, Kansas	2,661
none				Edwards County, Kansas	2,640
none				Gove County, Kansas	2,631
none				Ness County, Kansas	2,617
none				Cheyenne County, Kansas	2,604
none				Hamilton County, Kansas	2,500
none				Morton County, Kansas	2,470
none				Elk County, Kansas	2,458
none				Kiowa County, Kansas	2,432
none				Rawlins County, Kansas	2,431
none				Sheridan County, Kansas	2,427
none				Graham County, Kansas	2,371
none				Wichita County, Kansas	2,031
none				Stanton County, Kansas	1,986
none				Clark County, Kansas	1,900
none				Comanche County, Kansas	1,673
none				Hodgeman County, Kansas	1,619
none				Lane County, Kansas	1,508
none				Wallace County, Kansas	1,441
none				Greeley County, Kansas	1,182
State of Kansas					2,977,220

The 22 core-based statistical areas of the State of Kansas (Note: For CBSAs comprising populations from multiple states, they are listed twice to show both their intrastate population within that CBSA as well as the CBSA's total population. Only the intrastate population is ranked.)
2025 rank	Core-based statistical area	Population				
2025 rank	Core-based statistical area	2025 estimate	Change	2020 Census	Change	2010 Census
1	Kansas City, MO-KS MSA (KS)	938,193	+3.69%	904,771	+10.29%	820,354
2	Wichita, KS MSA	663,809	+2.50%	647,610	+3.94%	623,061
3	Topeka, KS MSA	233,052	−0.04%	233,152	−0.31%	233,870
4	Manhattan, KS MSA	136,122	+1.55%	134,046	+5.48%	127,081
5	Lawrence, KS MSA	120,920	+1.80%	118,785	+7.18%	110,826
6	Hutchinson, KS μSA	61,539	−0.58%	61,898	−4.05%	64,511
7	Salina, KS μSA	59,121	−1.53%	60,038	−2.69%	61,697
9	Pittsburg, KS μSA	39,008	+0.09%	38,972	−0.41%	39,134
8	Garden City, KS μSA	37,505	−2.51%	38,470	+4.61%	36,776
10	Emporia, KS μSA	34,838	+0.25%	34,751	−4.74%	36,480
11	Arkansas City–Winfield, KS μSA	34,382	−0.48%	34,549	−4.85%	36,311
12	Dodge City, KS μSA	33,993	−0.86%	34,287	+1.30%	33,848
13	Coffeyville, KS μSA	30,177	−4.16%	31,486	−11.23%	35,471
14	McPherson, KS μSA	30,064	−0.53%	30,223	+3.57%	29,180
15	Hays, KS μSA	29,075	+0.49%	28,934	+1.69%	28,452
16	Ottawa, KS μSA	26,299	+1.17%	25,996	+0.02%	25,992
17	Great Bend, KS μSA	24,790	−2.76%	25,493	−7.88%	27,674
18	Liberal, KS μSA	21,073	−4.06%	21,964	−4.30%	22,952
19	Parsons, KS μSA	19,685	−2.47%	20,184	−6.59%	21,607
20	Joplin, MO-KS MSA (KS)	19,105	−1.33%	19,362	−10.37%	21,603
21	Atchison, KS μSA	16,172	−1.08%	16,348	−3.40%	16,924
22	St. Joseph, MO-KS MSA (KS)	7,594	+1.12%	7,510	−5.48%	7,945
	Joplin, MO-KS MSA	208,796	+4.00%	200,771	+1.85%	197,121
	Kansas City, MO-KS MSA	2,270,592	+3.58%	2,192,035	+9.09%	2,009,342
	St. Joseph, MO-KS MSA	119,170	−1.89%	121,467	−4.60%	127,329

The three combined statistical areas of the State of Kansas (Note: For CSAs comprising populations from multiple states, they are listed twice to show both their intrastate population within that CSA as well as the CSA's total population. Only the intrastate population is ranked.)
2025 rank	Combined statistical area	Population				
2025 rank	Combined statistical area	2025 estimate	Change	2020 Census	Change	2010 Census
1	Kansas City–Overland Park–Kansas City, MO-KS CSA (KS)	1,101,584	+2.62%	1,073,410	+9.30%	982,041
2	Wichita–Arkansas City–Winfield, KS CSA	698,191	+2.35%	682,159	+3.46%	659,372
3	Joplin–Miami, MO-OK-KS CSA (KS)	19,105	−1.33%	19,362	−10.37%	21,603
	Joplin–Miami, MO-OK-KS CSA	239,234	+3.54%	231,056	+0.91%	228,969
	Kansas City–Overland Park–Kansas City, MO-KS CSA	2,609,823	+3.21%	2,528,644	+7.92%	2,343,008

== See also ==
- Geography of Kansas
  - Demographics of Kansas
