= Statistical area =

Defined statistical regions of the United States

The United States federal government defines and delineates the nation's metropolitan areas for statistical purposes, using a set of standard statistical area definitions. As of 2023, the U.S. Office of Management and Budget (OMB) defined and delineated 393 metropolitan statistical areas (MSAs) and 542 micropolitan statistical areas (μSAs) in the United States and Puerto Rico. Many of these 935 MSAs and μSAs are, in turn, components of larger combined statistical areas (CSAs) consisting of adjacent MSAs and μSAs that are linked by commuting ties; as of 2023, 582 metropolitan and micropolitan areas are components of the 184 defined CSAs.

Metropolitan and micropolitan statistical areas are defined as consisting of one or more adjacent counties or county equivalents with at least one urban core area meeting relevant population thresholds, plus adjacent territory that has a high degree of social and economic integration with the core, as measured by commuting ties. A metropolitan statistical area has at least one core with a population of at least 50,000. In a micropolitan statistical area, the largest core has a population of at least 10,000 but less than 50,000.

== Maps ==
An enlargeable map of the 935 core-based statistical areas (MSAs and μSAs) of the 50 states, the District of Columbia, and Puerto Rico. The 393 MSAs are shown in medium green . The 542 μSAs are shown in light green .

An enlargeable map of the 184 combined statistical areas (CSAs) of the 50 states, the District of Columbia, and Puerto Rico, shown in shades of green. The metropolitan statistical areas (MSAs) outside CSAs are shown in medium tan. The micropolitan statistical areas (μSAs) outside CSAs are shown in light tan.

== Types and distribution ==
The sortable table below shows the number of combined, metropolitan and micropolitan statistical areas in each of the U.S. states, the District of Columbia, and Puerto Rico as of 2023. For each jurisdiction, it lists:

1. Total number of delineated areas wholly or partially in the named jurisdiction
2. The number of CSAs wholly or partially in the jurisdiction
3. The number of core-based statistical areas (i.e., MSAs and μSAs) wholly or partially in the jurisdiction
4. The number of MSAs wholly or partially in the jurisdiction
5. The number of μSAs wholly or partially in the jurisdiction

Number of statistical areas in the United States and Puerto Rico (Note: Because many metropolitan and micropolitan areas overlap jurisdictional boundaries, columns are not additive.)
Jurisdiction	Delineated areas	CSAs	Core-based areas	MSAs	μSAs
Alabama	35	9	26	13	13
Alaska	4	0	4	2	2
Arizona	13	2	11	7	4
Arkansas	25	4	21	7	14
California	42	7	35	25	10
Colorado	20	3	17	7	10
Connecticut	9	2	7	5	2
Delaware	4	1	3	2	1
Florida	35	7	28	22	6
Georgia	46	7	39	15	24
Hawaiʻi	4	0	4	2	2
Idaho	22	5	17	7	10
Illinois	47	14	33	12	21
Indiana	50	10	40	15	25
Iowa	31	7	24	9	15
Kansas	25	3	22	7	15
Kentucky	32	8	24	9	15
Louisiana	25	6	19	10	9
Maine	5	1	4	3	1
Maryland	13	3	10	6	4
Massachusetts	12	2	10	7	3
Michigan	43	8	35	16	19
Minnesota	34	6	28	9	19
Mississippi	27	6	21	4	17
Missouri	31	6	25	7	18
Montana	7	0	7	5	2
Nebraska	16	3	13	4	9
Nevada	10	2	8	3	5
New Hampshire	8	2	6	2	4
New Jersey	9	3	6	6	0
New Mexico	19	2	17	4	13
New York	34	7	27	13	14
North Carolina	48	9	39	15	24
North Dakota	9	1	8	4	4
Ohio	55	11	44	15	29
Oklahoma	28	6	22	5	17
Oregon	24	4	20	8	12
Pennsylvania	48	12	36	20	16
Rhode Island	2	1	1	1	0
South Carolina	20	4	16	10	6
South Dakota	14	2	12	3	9
Tennessee	34	7	27	10	17
Texas	80	13	67	26	41
Utah	12	1	11	5	6
Vermont	8	2	6	1	5
Virginia	19	4	15	11	4
Washington	29	6	23	13	10
West Virginia	20	5	15	10	5
Wisconsin	40	11	29	15	14
Wyoming	10	0	10	2	8
District of Columbia	2	1	1	1	0
United States	1106	181	925	387	538
Puerto Rico	13	3	10	6	4
United States & Puerto Rico	1119	184	935	393	542

== See also ==
- United States of America
  - Outline of the United States
- Demographics of the United States
  - United States Census Bureau
    - List of U.S. states and territories by population
    - List of United States cities by population
    - List of U.S. cities by adjusted per capita personal income
    - List of United States counties and county equivalents
  - United States Office of Management and Budget
    - Statistical area (United States)
      - Combined statistical area
      - Core-based statistical area (list)
        - Metropolitan statistical area
        - Micropolitan statistical area
