= District of Columbia statistical areas =

Coordinates: 38.9101°N 77.0147°W

The United States District of Columbia (Washington, D.C.) is the primary city of two statistical areas that have been delineated by the Office of Management and Budget (OMB). On July 21, 2023, the OMB delineated the Washington-Arlington-Alexandria, DC-VA-MD-WV MSA and the more extensive Washington-Baltimore-Arlington, DC-MD-VA-WV-PA CSA.

== Statistical areas ==
The Office of Management and Budget (OMB) has designated more than 1,000 statistical areas for the United States and Puerto Rico. These statistical areas are important geographic delineations of population clusters used by the OMB, the United States Census Bureau, planning organizations, and federal, state, and local government entities.

The OMB defines a core-based statistical area (commonly referred to as a CBSA) as the county or counties (or county-equivalents) surrounding at least one densely-settled core of at least 10,000 population, "plus adjacent counties having a high degree of social and economic integration with the core as measured through commuting ties with the counties containing the core". The OMB further divides core-based statistical areas based on population into metropolitan statistical areas (MSAs) for those with at least 50,000 and micropolitan statistical areas (μSAs) for those with 10,000 to 49,999 people.

The OMB defines a combined statistical area (CSA) as two or more adjacent core-based statistical areas where the employment interchange rate (% commuting from A to B plus % commuting from B to A) is at least 15%. The primary statistical areas (PSAs) include all combined statistical areas and any core-based statistical area that is not a constituent of a combined statistical area.

The two United States statistical areas of the District of Columbia (Note: An out-of-state area and its population are displayed in green. An area that extends into more than one state is displayed in purple. A purple population number over a black population number show the total population versus the in-state population. The state's abbreviation is also shown next to the in-state total.)
Combined statistical area	2023 population (est.)	Core-based statistical area	2023 population (est.)	County	2023 population (est.)	Metropolitan division	2023 population (est.)
Washington-Baltimore-Arlington, DC-MD-VA-WV-PA CSA	10,069,592; 678,972 (DC)	Washington-Arlington-Alexandria, DC-VA-MD-WV MSA	6,304,975; 678,972 (DC)	Fairfax County, Virginia	1,141,878	Arlington-Alexandria-Reston, VA-WV MD	3,154,735
Washington-Baltimore-Arlington, DC-MD-VA-WV-PA CSA	10,069,592; 678,972 (DC)	Washington-Arlington-Alexandria, DC-VA-MD-WV MSA	6,304,975; 678,972 (DC)	Prince William County, Virginia	489,640	Arlington-Alexandria-Reston, VA-WV MD	3,154,735
Washington-Baltimore-Arlington, DC-MD-VA-WV-PA CSA	10,069,592; 678,972 (DC)	Washington-Arlington-Alexandria, DC-VA-MD-WV MSA	6,304,975; 678,972 (DC)	Loudoun County, Virginia	436,347	Arlington-Alexandria-Reston, VA-WV MD	3,154,735
Washington-Baltimore-Arlington, DC-MD-VA-WV-PA CSA	10,069,592; 678,972 (DC)	Washington-Arlington-Alexandria, DC-VA-MD-WV MSA	6,304,975; 678,972 (DC)	Arlington County, Virginia	234,162	Arlington-Alexandria-Reston, VA-WV MD	3,154,735
Washington-Baltimore-Arlington, DC-MD-VA-WV-PA CSA	10,069,592; 678,972 (DC)	Washington-Arlington-Alexandria, DC-VA-MD-WV MSA	6,304,975; 678,972 (DC)	Stafford County, Virginia	165,428	Arlington-Alexandria-Reston, VA-WV MD	3,154,735
Washington-Baltimore-Arlington, DC-MD-VA-WV-PA CSA	10,069,592; 678,972 (DC)	Washington-Arlington-Alexandria, DC-VA-MD-WV MSA	6,304,975; 678,972 (DC)	City of Alexandria, Virginia	155,230	Arlington-Alexandria-Reston, VA-WV MD	3,154,735
Washington-Baltimore-Arlington, DC-MD-VA-WV-PA CSA	10,069,592; 678,972 (DC)	Washington-Arlington-Alexandria, DC-VA-MD-WV MSA	6,304,975; 678,972 (DC)	Spotsylvania County, Virginia	149,588	Arlington-Alexandria-Reston, VA-WV MD	3,154,735
Washington-Baltimore-Arlington, DC-MD-VA-WV-PA CSA	10,069,592; 678,972 (DC)	Washington-Arlington-Alexandria, DC-VA-MD-WV MSA	6,304,975; 678,972 (DC)	Fauquier County, Virginia	75,165	Arlington-Alexandria-Reston, VA-WV MD	3,154,735
Washington-Baltimore-Arlington, DC-MD-VA-WV-PA CSA	10,069,592; 678,972 (DC)	Washington-Arlington-Alexandria, DC-VA-MD-WV MSA	6,304,975; 678,972 (DC)	Jefferson County, West Virginia	59,787	Arlington-Alexandria-Reston, VA-WV MD	3,154,735
Washington-Baltimore-Arlington, DC-MD-VA-WV-PA CSA	10,069,592; 678,972 (DC)	Washington-Arlington-Alexandria, DC-VA-MD-WV MSA	6,304,975; 678,972 (DC)	Culpeper County, Virginia	54,973	Arlington-Alexandria-Reston, VA-WV MD	3,154,735
Washington-Baltimore-Arlington, DC-MD-VA-WV-PA CSA	10,069,592; 678,972 (DC)	Washington-Arlington-Alexandria, DC-VA-MD-WV MSA	6,304,975; 678,972 (DC)	City of Manassas, Virginia	42,696	Arlington-Alexandria-Reston, VA-WV MD	3,154,735
Washington-Baltimore-Arlington, DC-MD-VA-WV-PA CSA	10,069,592; 678,972 (DC)	Washington-Arlington-Alexandria, DC-VA-MD-WV MSA	6,304,975; 678,972 (DC)	Warren County, Virginia	41,843	Arlington-Alexandria-Reston, VA-WV MD	3,154,735
Washington-Baltimore-Arlington, DC-MD-VA-WV-PA CSA	10,069,592; 678,972 (DC)	Washington-Arlington-Alexandria, DC-VA-MD-WV MSA	6,304,975; 678,972 (DC)	City of Fredericksburg, Virginia	28,928	Arlington-Alexandria-Reston, VA-WV MD	3,154,735
Washington-Baltimore-Arlington, DC-MD-VA-WV-PA CSA	10,069,592; 678,972 (DC)	Washington-Arlington-Alexandria, DC-VA-MD-WV MSA	6,304,975; 678,972 (DC)	City of Fairfax, Virginia	25,144	Arlington-Alexandria-Reston, VA-WV MD	3,154,735
Washington-Baltimore-Arlington, DC-MD-VA-WV-PA CSA	10,069,592; 678,972 (DC)	Washington-Arlington-Alexandria, DC-VA-MD-WV MSA	6,304,975; 678,972 (DC)	City of Manassas Park, Virginia	16,361	Arlington-Alexandria-Reston, VA-WV MD	3,154,735
Washington-Baltimore-Arlington, DC-MD-VA-WV-PA CSA	10,069,592; 678,972 (DC)	Washington-Arlington-Alexandria, DC-VA-MD-WV MSA	6,304,975; 678,972 (DC)	Clarke County, Virginia	15,466	Arlington-Alexandria-Reston, VA-WV MD	3,154,735
Washington-Baltimore-Arlington, DC-MD-VA-WV-PA CSA	10,069,592; 678,972 (DC)	Washington-Arlington-Alexandria, DC-VA-MD-WV MSA	6,304,975; 678,972 (DC)	City of Falls Church, Virginia	14,685	Arlington-Alexandria-Reston, VA-WV MD	3,154,735
Washington-Baltimore-Arlington, DC-MD-VA-WV-PA CSA	10,069,592; 678,972 (DC)	Washington-Arlington-Alexandria, DC-VA-MD-WV MSA	6,304,975; 678,972 (DC)	Rappahannock County, Virginia	7,414	Arlington-Alexandria-Reston, VA-WV MD	3,154,735
Washington-Baltimore-Arlington, DC-MD-VA-WV-PA CSA	10,069,592; 678,972 (DC)	Washington-Arlington-Alexandria, DC-VA-MD-WV MSA	6,304,975; 678,972 (DC)	Prince George's County, Maryland	947,430	Washington, DC-MD MD	1,798,375; 678,972 (DC)
Washington-Baltimore-Arlington, DC-MD-VA-WV-PA CSA	10,069,592; 678,972 (DC)	Washington-Arlington-Alexandria, DC-VA-MD-WV MSA	6,304,975; 678,972 (DC)	District of Columbia	678,972	Washington, DC-MD MD	1,798,375; 678,972 (DC)
Washington-Baltimore-Arlington, DC-MD-VA-WV-PA CSA	10,069,592; 678,972 (DC)	Washington-Arlington-Alexandria, DC-VA-MD-WV MSA	6,304,975; 678,972 (DC)	Charles County, Maryland	171,973	Washington, DC-MD MD	1,798,375; 678,972 (DC)
Washington-Baltimore-Arlington, DC-MD-VA-WV-PA CSA	10,069,592; 678,972 (DC)	Washington-Arlington-Alexandria, DC-VA-MD-WV MSA	6,304,975; 678,972 (DC)	Montgomery County, Maryland	1,058,474	Frederick-Gaithersburg-Bethesda, MD MD	1,351,865
Washington-Baltimore-Arlington, DC-MD-VA-WV-PA CSA	10,069,592; 678,972 (DC)	Washington-Arlington-Alexandria, DC-VA-MD-WV MSA	6,304,975; 678,972 (DC)	Frederick County, Maryland	293,391	Frederick-Gaithersburg-Bethesda, MD MD	1,351,865
Washington-Baltimore-Arlington, DC-MD-VA-WV-PA CSA	10,069,592; 678,972 (DC)	Baltimore-Columbia-Towson, MD MSA	2,834,316	Baltimore County, Maryland	844,703	none	
Washington-Baltimore-Arlington, DC-MD-VA-WV-PA CSA	10,069,592; 678,972 (DC)	Baltimore-Columbia-Towson, MD MSA	2,834,316	Anne Arundel County, Maryland	594,582	none	
Washington-Baltimore-Arlington, DC-MD-VA-WV-PA CSA	10,069,592; 678,972 (DC)	Baltimore-Columbia-Towson, MD MSA	2,834,316	Baltimore City, Maryland	565,239	none	
Washington-Baltimore-Arlington, DC-MD-VA-WV-PA CSA	10,069,592; 678,972 (DC)	Baltimore-Columbia-Towson, MD MSA	2,834,316	Howard County, Maryland	336,001	none	
Washington-Baltimore-Arlington, DC-MD-VA-WV-PA CSA	10,069,592; 678,972 (DC)	Baltimore-Columbia-Towson, MD MSA	2,834,316	Harford County, Maryland	264,644	none	
Washington-Baltimore-Arlington, DC-MD-VA-WV-PA CSA	10,069,592; 678,972 (DC)	Baltimore-Columbia-Towson, MD MSA	2,834,316	Carroll County, Maryland	176,639	none	
Washington-Baltimore-Arlington, DC-MD-VA-WV-PA CSA	10,069,592; 678,972 (DC)	Baltimore-Columbia-Towson, MD MSA	2,834,316	Queen Anne's County, Maryland	52,508	none	
Washington-Baltimore-Arlington, DC-MD-VA-WV-PA CSA	10,069,592; 678,972 (DC)	Hagerstown-Martinsburg, MD-WV MSA	305,902	Washington County, Maryland	155,813	none	
Washington-Baltimore-Arlington, DC-MD-VA-WV-PA CSA	10,069,592; 678,972 (DC)	Hagerstown-Martinsburg, MD-WV MSA	305,902	Berkeley County, West Virginia	132,440	none	
Washington-Baltimore-Arlington, DC-MD-VA-WV-PA CSA	10,069,592; 678,972 (DC)	Hagerstown-Martinsburg, MD-WV MSA	305,902	Morgan County, West Virginia	17,649	none	
Washington-Baltimore-Arlington, DC-MD-VA-WV-PA CSA	10,069,592; 678,972 (DC)	Lexington Park, MD μSA	210,009	St. Mary's County, Maryland	115,281	none	
Washington-Baltimore-Arlington, DC-MD-VA-WV-PA CSA	10,069,592; 678,972 (DC)	Lexington Park, MD μSA	210,009	Calvert County, Maryland	94,728	none	
Washington-Baltimore-Arlington, DC-MD-VA-WV-PA CSA	10,069,592; 678,972 (DC)	Chambersburg, PA MSA	157,854	Franklin County, Pennsylvania	157,854	none	
Washington-Baltimore-Arlington, DC-MD-VA-WV-PA CSA	10,069,592; 678,972 (DC)	Winchester, VA-WV MSA	147,260	Frederick County, Virginia	95,994	none	
Washington-Baltimore-Arlington, DC-MD-VA-WV-PA CSA	10,069,592; 678,972 (DC)	Winchester, VA-WV MSA	147,260	City of Winchester, Virginia	27,617	none	
Washington-Baltimore-Arlington, DC-MD-VA-WV-PA CSA	10,069,592; 678,972 (DC)	Winchester, VA-WV MSA	147,260	Hampshire County, West Virginia	23,649	none	
Washington-Baltimore-Arlington, DC-MD-VA-WV-PA CSA	10,069,592; 678,972 (DC)	Lake of the Woods, VA μSA	38,574	Orange County, Virginia	38,574	none	
Washington-Baltimore-Arlington, DC-MD-VA-WV-PA CSA	10,069,592; 678,972 (DC)	Easton, MD μSA	37,823	Talbot County, Maryland	37,823	none	
Washington-Baltimore-Arlington, DC-MD-VA-WV-PA CSA	10,069,592; 678,972 (DC)	Cambridge, MD μSA	32,879	Dorchester County, Maryland	32,879	none	
District of Columbia					678,972		

The one core-based statistical area of the District of Columbia (Note: For CBSAs comprising populations from multiple states, they are listed twice to show both their intrastate population within that CBSA as well as the CBSA's total population. Only the intrastate population is ranked.)
2023 rank	Core-based statistical area	Population				
2023 rank	Core-based statistical area	2023 estimate	Change	2020 Census	Change	2010 Census
1	Washington-Arlington-Alexandria, DC-VA-MD-WV MSA (DC)	678,972	−1.53%	689,545	+14.60%	601,723
	Washington-Arlington-Alexandria, DC-VA-MD-WV MSA	6,304,975	+0.42%	6,278,542	+13.18%	5,547,495

The one combined statistical area of the District of Columbia (Note: For CSAs comprising populations from multiple states, they are listed twice to show both their intrastate population within that CSA as well as the CSA's total population. Only the intrastate population is ranked.)
2023 rank	Combined statistical area	Population				
2023 rank	Combined statistical area	2023 estimate	Change	2020 Census	Change	2010 Census
1	Washington-Baltimore-Arlington, DC-MD-VA-WV-PA CSA (DC)	678,972	−1.53%	689,545	+14.60%	601,723
	Washington-Baltimore-Arlington, DC-MD-VA-WV-PA CSA	10,069,592	+0.41%	10,028,331	+10.17%	9,102,983

== See also ==
- Geography of the District of Columbia
  - Demographics of the District of Columbia
