= Geography of Wyoming =

US State Geography

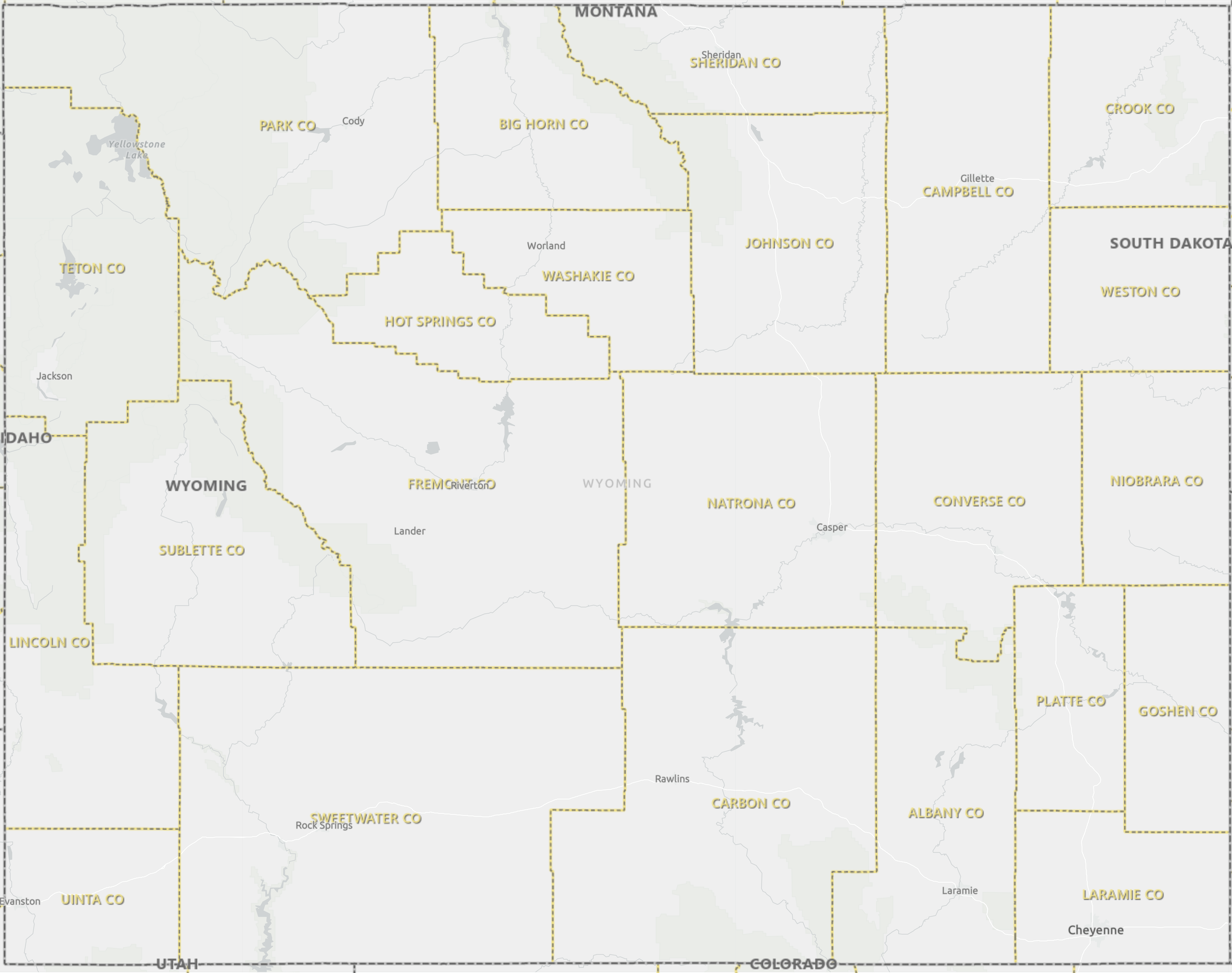
Map of the counties and capital city of Wyoming

The U.S. state of Wyoming lies in the Mountain West subregion of the Western United States and has a varied geography. It is bordered by Montana to the north and northwest, South Dakota and Nebraska to the east, Idaho to the west, Utah to the southwest, and Colorado to the south. Wyoming is the least populous U.S. state and has the second-lowest population density behind Alaska.

Wyoming's western half is covered mostly by the ranges and rangelands of the Rocky Mountains, while the eastern half of the state is high-elevation prairie called the High Plains. It is drier and windier than the rest of the country, being split between semi-arid and continental climates with greater temperature extremes. Almost half of the land in Wyoming is owned by the federal government, generally protected for public uses. The state ranks 6th by area and fifth by proportion of a state's land owned by the federal government. Federal lands within Wyoming include two national parks (Grand Teton and Yellowstone), two national recreation areas, two national monuments, several national forests, historic sites, fish hatcheries, and wildlife refuges.

== Climate ==
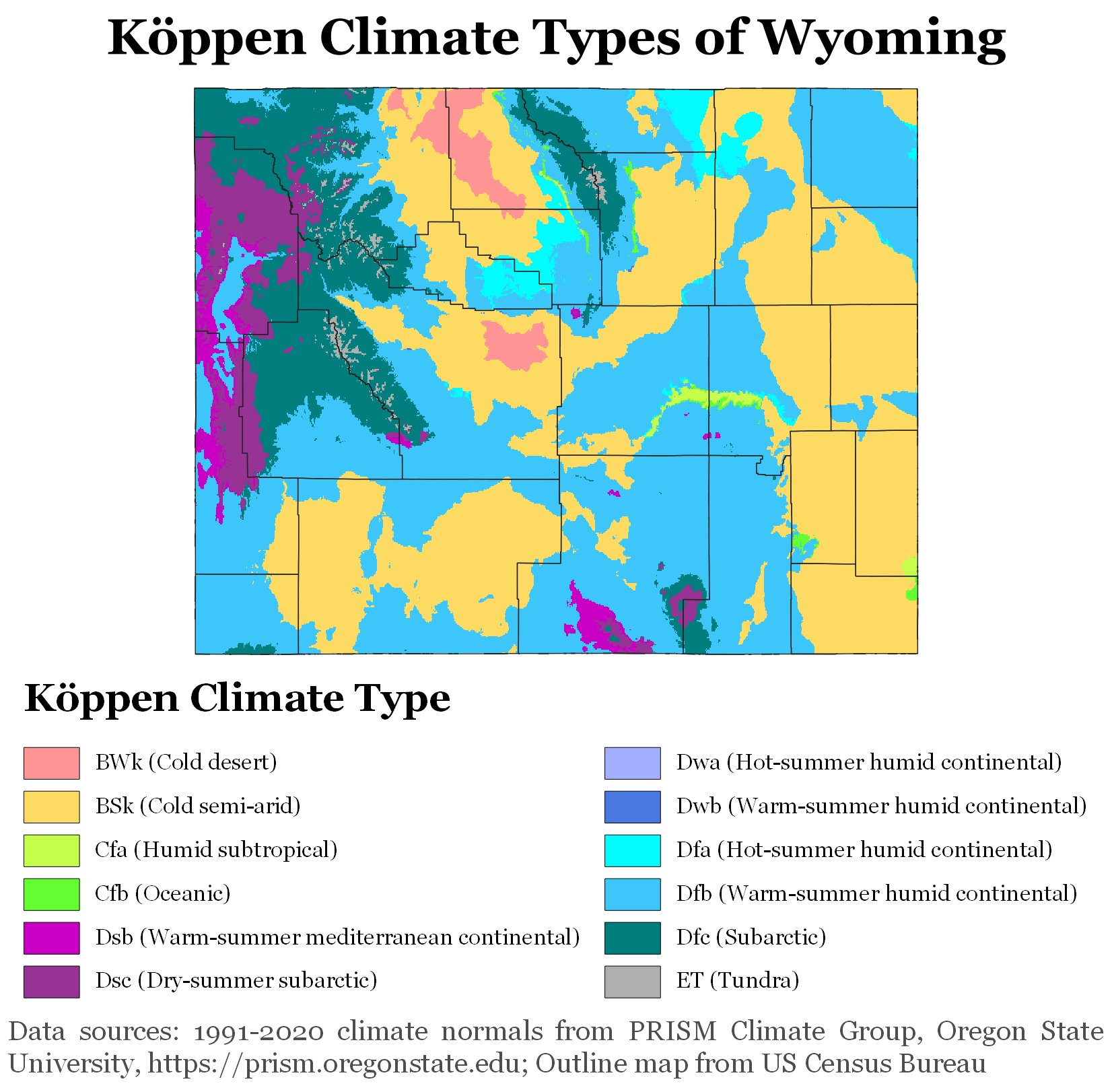
Köppen climate types of Wyoming, using 1991-2020 climate normals.

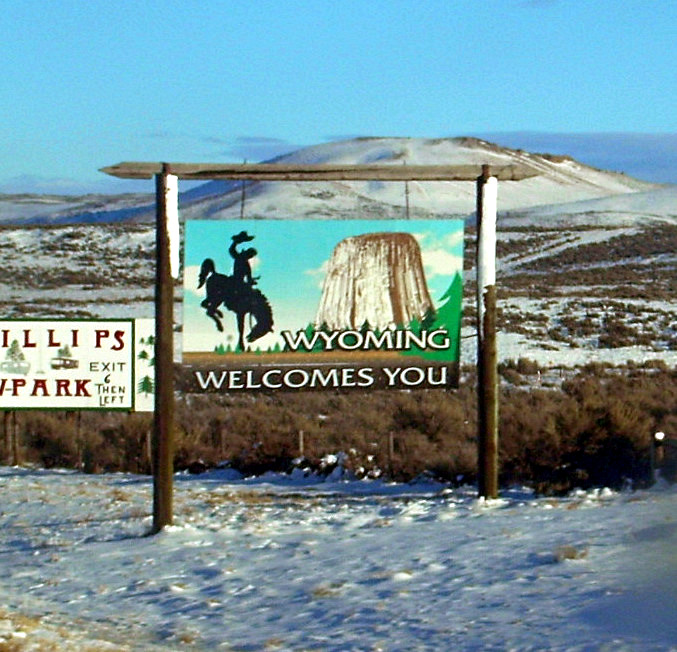
On Interstate 80, leaving Utah

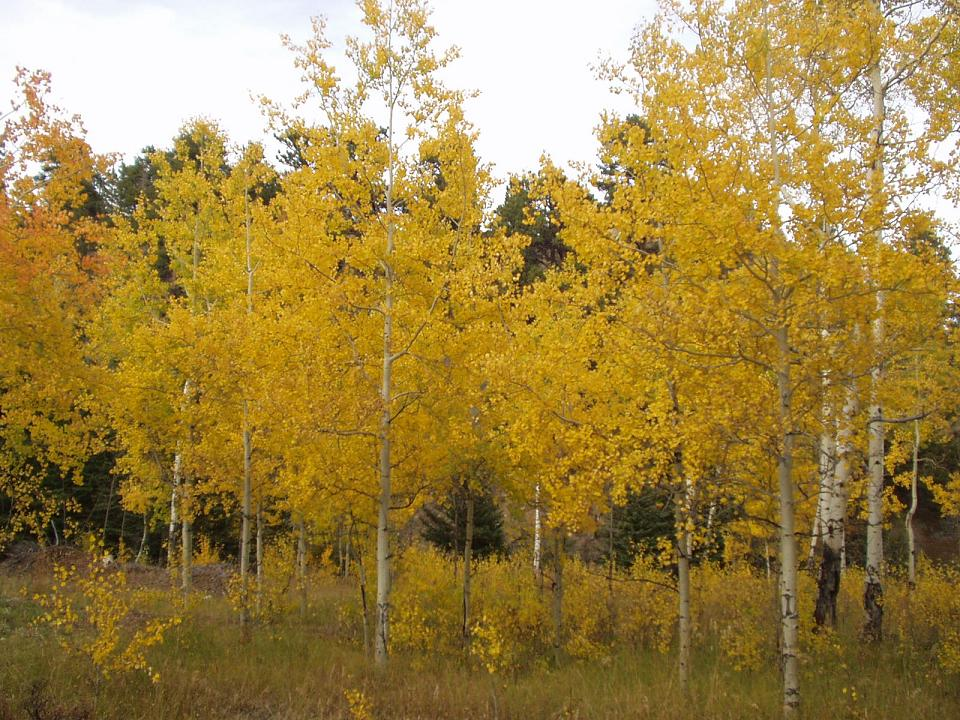
Autumn in the Bighorn Mountains

Wyoming's climate is generally semi-arid and continental (Köppen climate classification BSk), and is drier and windier in comparison to most of the United States with greater temperature extremes. Much of this is due to the topography of the state. Summers in Wyoming are warm with July high temperatures averaging between 80 and 90 °F (27 and 32 °C) in most of the state. With increasing elevation, however, this average drops rapidly with locations above 9,000 feet (2,700 m) averaging around 70 °F (21 °C). Summer nights throughout the state are characterized by a rapid cooldown with even the hottest locations averaging in the 50–60 °F (10–16 °C) range at night. In most of the state, most of the precipitation tends to fall in the late spring and early summer. Winters are cold, but are variable with periods of sometimes extreme cold interspersed between generally mild periods, with Chinook winds providing unusually warm temperatures in some locations.

Wyoming is a dry state with much of the land receiving less than 10 inches (250 mm) of rainfall per year. Precipitation depends on elevation with lower areas in the Big Horn Basin averaging 5–8 inches (130–200 mm), making the area nearly a true desert. The lower areas in the North and on the eastern plains typically average around 10–12 inches (250–300 mm), making the climate there semi-arid. Some mountain areas do receive a good amount of precipitation, 20 inches (510 mm) or more, much of it as snow, sometimes 200 inches (510 cm) or more annually. The state's highest recorded temperature is 114 °F (46 °C) at Basin on July 12, 1900, and the lowest recorded temperature is −66 °F (−54 °C) at Riverside on February 9, 1933.

The number of thunderstorm days vary across the state with the southeastern plains of the state having the most days of thunderstorm activity. Thunderstorm activity in the state is highest during the late spring and early summer. The southeastern corner of the state is the most vulnerable part of the state to tornado activity. Moving away from that point and westwards, the incidence of tornadoes drops dramatically with the west part of the state showing little vulnerability. Tornadoes, where they occur, tend to be small and brief, unlike some of those that occur farther east. The most destructive tornado to occur in Wyoming happened on July 16, 1979, in Cheyenne and caused one death and 40 injuries.

=== Climate data ===
Casper climate: Average maximum and minimum temperatures, and average rainfall.
Month	Jan	Feb	Mar	Apr	May	Jun	Jul	Aug	Sep	Oct	Nov	Dec	Year
Average max. temperature °F (°C)	32 (0)	37 (3)	45 (7)	56 (13)	66 (19)	78 (26)	87 (31)	85 (29)	74 (23)	60 (16)	44 (7)	34 (1)	58 (14)
Average min. temperature °F (°C)	12 (−11)	16 (−9)	21 (−6)	28 (−2)	37 (3)	46 (8)	54 (12)	51 (11)	41 (5)	32 (0)	21 (−6)	14 (−10)	31 (-1)
Average rainfall inches (mm)	0.6 (15.2)	0.6 (15.2)	1.0 (25.4)	1.6 (40.6)	2.1 (53.3)	1.5 (38.1)	1.3 (33.0)	0.7 (17.8)	0.9 (22.9)	1.0 (25.4)	0.8 (20.3)	0.7 (17.8)	12.8 (325.1)

Jackson climate: Average maximum and minimum temperatures, and average rainfall.
Month	Jan	Feb	Mar	Apr	May	Jun	Jul	Aug	Sep	Oct	Nov	Dec	Year
Average max. temperature °F (°C)	24 (−4)	28 (−2)	37 (3)	47 (8)	58 (14)	68 (20)	78 (26)	77 (25)	67 (19)	54 (12)	37 (3)	24 (−4)	49 (9)
Average min. temperature °F (°C)	-1 (−18)	2 (−17)	10 (−12)	21 (−6)	30 (−1)	36 (2)	41 (5)	38 (3)	31 (−1)	22 (−6)	14 (−10)	0 (−18)	20 (-7)
Average rainfall inches (mm)	2.6 (66.0)	1.9 (48.3)	1.6 (40.6)	1.4 (35.6)	1.9 (48.3)	1.8 (45.7)	1.3 (33.0)	1.3 (33.0)	1.5 (38.1)	1.3 (33.0)	2.3 (58.4)	2.5 (63.5)	21.4 (543.6)

Climate data for Cheyenne Regional Airport, Wyoming (1991–2020 normals, (Note: Mean monthly maxima and minima (i.e. the expected highest and lowest temperature readings at any point during the year or given month) calculated based on data at said location from 1991 to 2020.) extremes 1872−present (Note: Official records for Cheyenne kept at the City Office from January 1871 to August 1935 and at Cheyenne Regional since September 1935.))
Month	Jan	Feb	Mar	Apr	May	Jun	Jul	Aug	Sep	Oct	Nov	Dec	Year
Record high °F (°C)	70 (21)	71 (22)	77 (25)	84 (29)	91 (33)	100 (38)	100 (38)	98 (37)	97 (36)	85 (29)	75 (24)	70 (21)	100 (38)
Mean maximum °F (°C)	58.4 (14.7)	60.0 (15.6)	68.6 (20.3)	74.8 (23.8)	82.7 (28.2)	90.8 (32.7)	94.4 (34.7)	92.5 (33.6)	88.1 (31.2)	78.5 (25.8)	67.2 (19.6)	58.8 (14.9)	95.2 (35.1)
Mean daily maximum °F (°C)	40.0 (4.4)	40.6 (4.8)	49.1 (9.5)	54.8 (12.7)	64.4 (18.0)	76.7 (24.8)	84.1 (28.9)	82.0 (27.8)	73.3 (22.9)	59.1 (15.1)	47.5 (8.6)	39.3 (4.1)	59.2 (15.1)
Daily mean °F (°C)	29.2 (−1.6)	29.5 (−1.4)	37.1 (2.8)	42.8 (6.0)	52.3 (11.3)	63.1 (17.3)	70.1 (21.2)	68.1 (20.1)	59.6 (15.3)	46.5 (8.1)	36.1 (2.3)	28.7 (−1.8)	46.9 (8.3)
Mean daily minimum °F (°C)	18.4 (−7.6)	18.4 (−7.6)	25.1 (−3.8)	30.8 (−0.7)	40.2 (4.6)	49.4 (9.7)	56.1 (13.4)	54.3 (12.4)	45.8 (7.7)	33.9 (1.1)	24.7 (−4.1)	18.1 (−7.7)	34.6 (1.4)
Mean minimum °F (°C)	−5.8 (−21.0)	−3.8 (−19.9)	6.6 (−14.1)	16.2 (−8.8)	26.6 (−3.0)	38.5 (3.6)	47.1 (8.4)	44.8 (7.1)	31.9 (−0.1)	16.4 (−8.7)	3.2 (−16.0)	−4.7 (−20.4)	−13.0 (−25.0)
Record low °F (°C)	−38 (−39)	−34 (−37)	−21 (−29)	−8 (−22)	8 (−13)	25 (−4)	33 (1)	25 (−4)	8 (−13)	−5 (−21)	−21 (−29)	−28 (−33)	−38 (−39)
Average precipitation inches (mm)	0.35 (8.9)	0.52 (13)	0.96 (24)	1.79 (45)	2.44 (62)	2.16 (55)	2.11 (54)	1.52 (39)	1.47 (37)	1.00 (25)	0.61 (15)	0.48 (12)	15.41 (391)
Average snowfall inches (cm)	6.3 (16)	9.0 (23)	9.7 (25)	11.3 (29)	3.4 (8.6)	0.0 (0.0)	0.0 (0.0)	0.0 (0.0)	1.0 (2.5)	5.9 (15)	7.5 (19)	8.8 (22)	62.9 (160)
Average extreme snow depth inches (cm)	3.8 (9.7)	3.9 (9.9)	3.8 (9.7)	3.4 (8.6)	1.7 (4.3)	0.0 (0.0)	0.0 (0.0)	0.0 (0.0)	0.5 (1.3)	2.8 (7.1)	4.0 (10)	4.4 (11)	8.5 (22)
Average precipitation days (≥ 0.01 in)	5.1	6.9	7.9	10.6	12.9	10.7	10.5	10.3	7.3	7.1	6.2	6.0	101.5
Average snowy days (≥ 0.1 in)	5.9	7.3	6.8	6.8	1.9	0.1	0.0	0.0	0.5	3.2	5.8	6.7	45.0
Average relative humidity (%)	52.5	54.6	56.1	54.3	55.8	53.5	51.3	51.4	51.5	50.0	53.6	54.0	53.2
Average dew point °F (°C)	9.9 (−12.3)	12.7 (−10.7)	17.1 (−8.3)	24.1 (−4.4)	33.3 (0.7)	41.4 (5.2)	46.2 (7.9)	44.4 (6.9)	35.8 (2.1)	25.5 (−3.6)	17.4 (−8.1)	11.1 (−11.6)	26.6 (−3.0)
Mean monthly sunshine hours	190.7	202.6	253.1	271.9	291.9	303.2	317.5	297.4	262.3	237.0	178.8	175.4	2,981.8
Percentage possible sunshine	64	68	68	68	65	67	69	70	70	69	60	61	67
Average ultraviolet index	1.7	2.7	4.5	6.4	8.2	9.7	10.2	8.8	6.5	3.9	2.2	1.4	5.5
Source 1: NOAA (relative humidity, dew points and sun 1961−1990)
Source 2: UV Index Today (1995 to 2022)

Climate data for Basin, Wyoming (1991–2020 normals, extremes 1898–present)
Month	Jan	Feb	Mar	Apr	May	Jun	Jul	Aug	Sep	Oct	Nov	Dec	Year
Record high °F (°C)	64 (18)	73 (23)	82 (28)	90 (32)	99 (37)	110 (43)	112 (44)	115 (46)	102 (39)	91 (33)	77 (25)	67 (19)	115 (46)
Mean maximum °F (°C)	47.9 (8.8)	55.1 (12.8)	72.3 (22.4)	81.9 (27.7)	89.0 (31.7)	97.4 (36.3)	101.9 (38.8)	99.8 (37.7)	94.7 (34.8)	82.9 (28.3)	64.2 (17.9)	51.3 (10.7)	102.4 (39.1)
Mean daily maximum °F (°C)	32.4 (0.2)	39.1 (3.9)	54.1 (12.3)	63.0 (17.2)	72.8 (22.7)	83.7 (28.7)	92.7 (33.7)	91.0 (32.8)	79.3 (26.3)	62.9 (17.2)	46.4 (8.0)	33.8 (1.0)	62.6 (17.0)
Daily mean °F (°C)	20.6 (−6.3)	26.8 (−2.9)	40.7 (4.8)	49.8 (9.9)	59.8 (15.4)	69.2 (20.7)	76.5 (24.7)	74.1 (23.4)	63.4 (17.4)	49.2 (9.6)	34.6 (1.4)	22.6 (−5.2)	48.9 (9.4)
Mean daily minimum °F (°C)	8.8 (−12.9)	14.6 (−9.7)	27.4 (−2.6)	36.5 (2.5)	46.8 (8.2)	54.7 (12.6)	60.3 (15.7)	57.2 (14.0)	47.5 (8.6)	35.5 (1.9)	22.8 (−5.1)	11.4 (−11.4)	35.3 (1.8)
Mean minimum °F (°C)	−16.3 (−26.8)	−10.3 (−23.5)	5.1 (−14.9)	19.2 (−7.1)	28.8 (−1.8)	40.4 (4.7)	48.6 (9.2)	43.9 (6.6)	32.0 (0.0)	17.1 (−8.3)	−0.6 (−18.1)	−9.7 (−23.2)	−22.3 (−30.2)
Record low °F (°C)	−43 (−42)	−51 (−46)	−31 (−35)	−4 (−20)	18 (−8)	30 (−1)	36 (2)	34 (1)	14 (−10)	−7 (−22)	−28 (−33)	−43 (−42)	−51 (−46)
Average precipitation inches (mm)	0.24 (6.1)	0.32 (8.1)	0.31 (7.9)	0.75 (19)	1.37 (35)	1.04 (26)	0.41 (10)	0.32 (8.1)	0.95 (24)	0.79 (20)	0.36 (9.1)	0.30 (7.6)	7.16 (180.9)
Average snowfall inches (cm)	3.4 (8.6)	4.1 (10)	2.3 (5.8)	1.5 (3.8)	0.1 (0.25)	0.0 (0.0)	0.0 (0.0)	0.0 (0.0)	0.2 (0.51)	1.5 (3.8)	3.0 (7.6)	4.0 (10)	20.1 (50.36)
Average precipitation days (≥ 0.01 in)	3.4	3.6	3.1	5.1	7.1	6.0	3.2	3.6	4.7	4.0	3.3	3.3	50.4
Average snowy days (≥ 0.1 in)	2.5	2.6	1.4	0.7	0.1	0.0	0.0	0.0	0.1	0.7	1.7	2.3	12.1
Source: NOAA

== Location and size ==
As specified in the designating legislation for the Territory of Wyoming, Wyoming's borders are lines of latitude 41°N and 45°N, and longitude 104°3'W and 111°3'W (27 and 34 west of the Washington Meridian)—a geodesic quadrangle. Due to surveying inaccuracies during the 19th century, Wyoming's legal border deviates from the true latitude and longitude lines by up to one-half mile (0.80 km) in some spots, especially in the mountainous region along the 45th parallel. Wyoming is bordered on the north by Montana, on the east by South Dakota and Nebraska, on the south by Colorado, on the southwest by Utah, and on the west by Idaho. It is the tenth largest state in the United States in total area, containing 97,814 square miles (253,340 km^{2}) and is made up of 23 counties. From the north border to the south border it is 276 miles (444 km); and from the east to the west border is 365 miles (587 km) at its south end and 342 miles (550 km) at the north end.

== Natural landforms ==
=== Mountain ranges ===
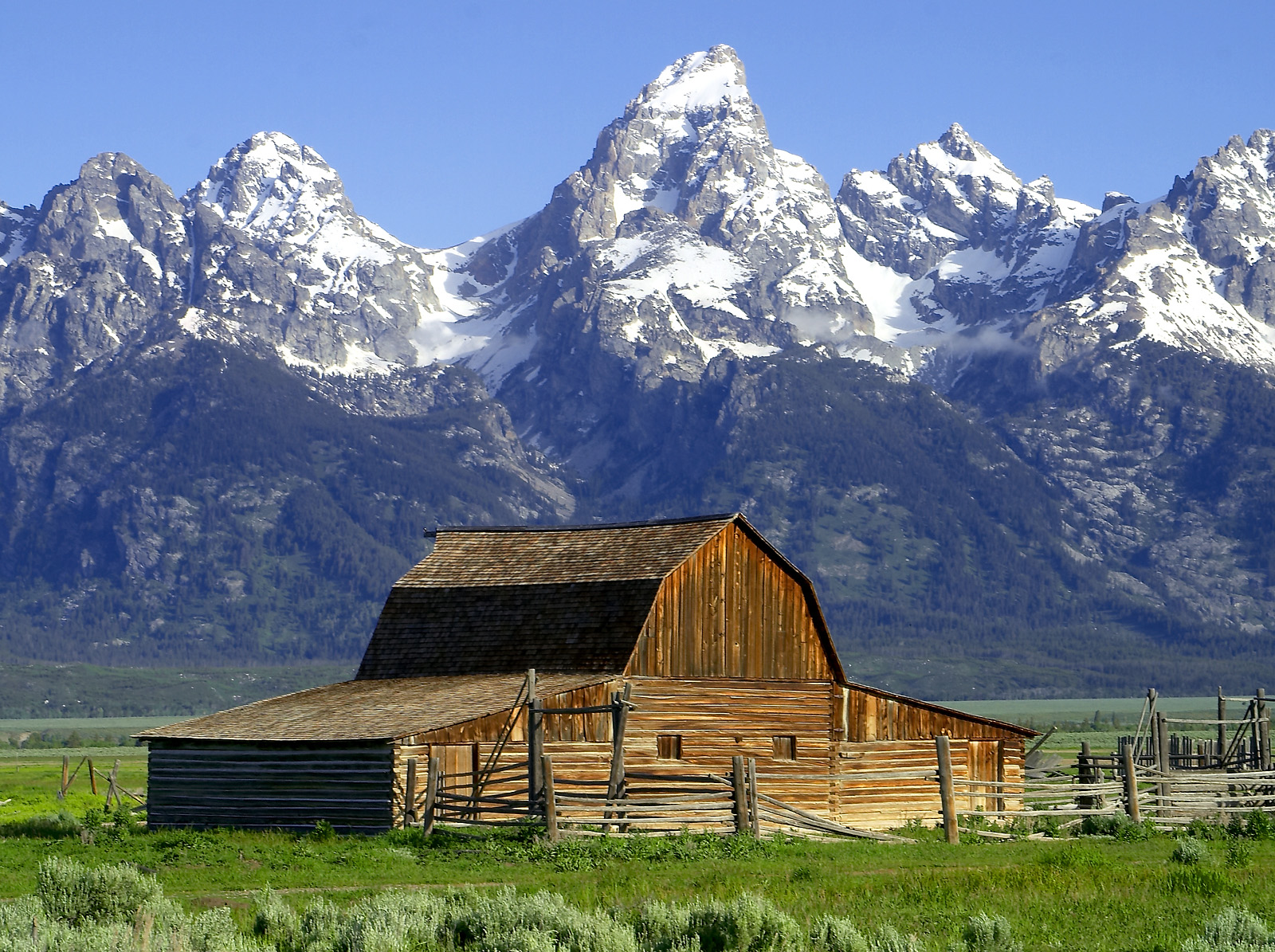
Teton Range

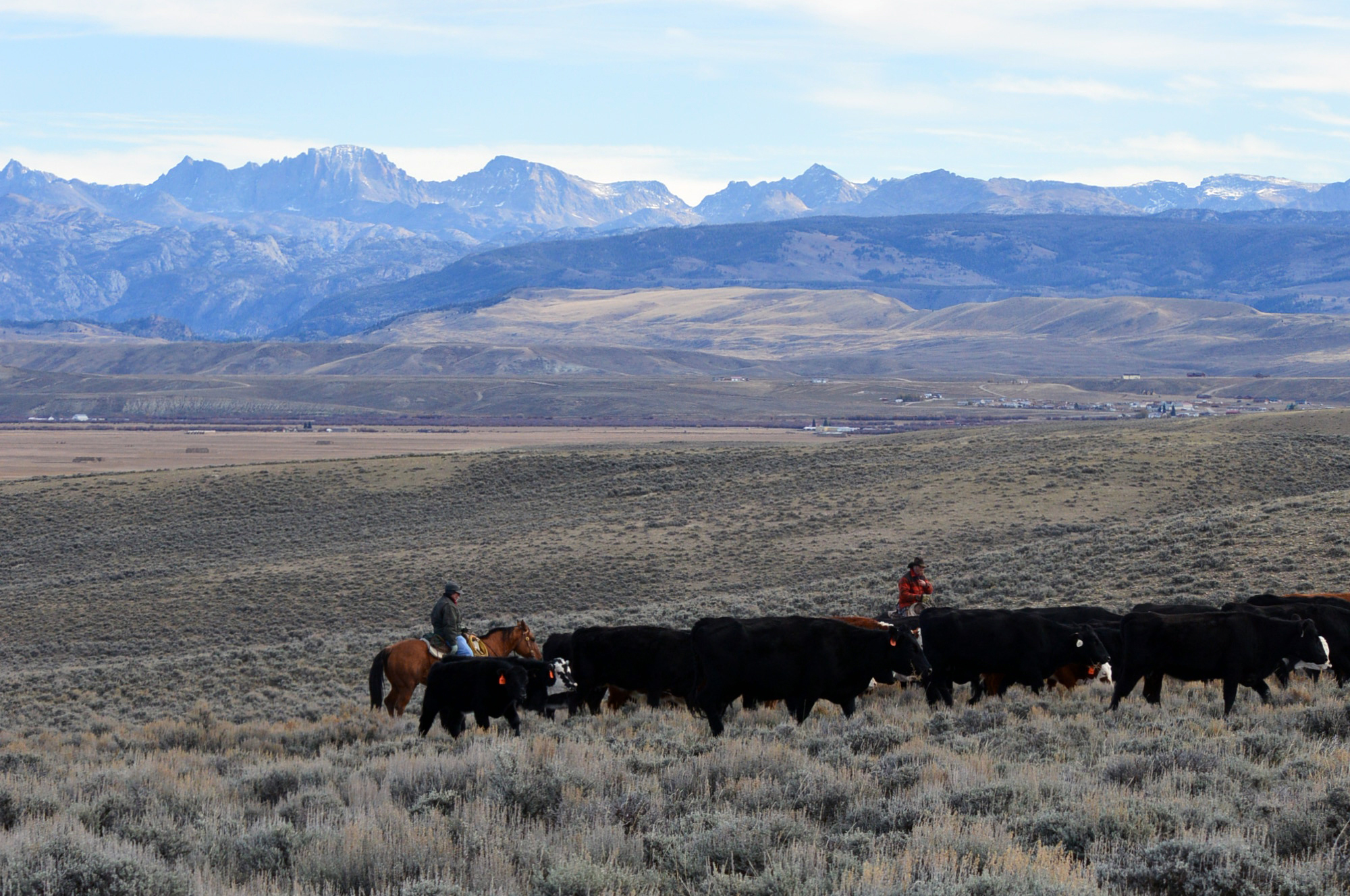
Green River valley

The Great Plains meet the Rocky Mountains in Wyoming. The state is a great plateau broken by many mountain ranges. Surface elevations range from the summit of Gannett Peak in the Wind River Mountain Range, at 13,804 feet (4,207 m), to the Belle Fourche River valley in the state's northeast corner, at 3,125 feet (952 m). In the northwest are the Absaroka, Owl Creek, Gros Ventre, Wind River, and the Teton ranges. In the north central are the Big Horn Mountains; in the northeast, the Black Hills; and in the southern region the Laramie, Snowy, and Sierra Madre ranges.

The Snowy Range in the south central part of the state is an extension of the Colorado Rockies both in geology and in appearance. The Wind River Range in the west central part of the state is remote and includes more than 40 mountain peaks in excess of 13,000 ft (4,000 m) tall in addition to Gannett Peak, the highest peak in the state. The Big Horn Mountains in the north central portion are somewhat isolated from the bulk of the Rocky Mountains.

The Teton Range in the northwest extends for 50 miles (80 km), part of which is included in Grand Teton National Park. The park includes the Grand Teton, the second highest peak in the state.

The Continental Divide spans north–south across the central portion of the state. Rivers east of the divide drain into the Missouri River Basin and eventually the Gulf of Mexico. They are the North Platte, Wind, Big Horn and the Yellowstone rivers. The Snake River in northwest Wyoming eventually drains into the Columbia River and the Pacific Ocean, as does the Green River through the Colorado River Basin.

The Continental Divide forks in the south central part of the state in an area known as the Great Divide Basin where water that precipitates onto or flows into it cannot reach an ocean—it all sinks into the soil and eventually evaporates.

Several rivers begin in or flow through the state, including the Yellowstone River, Bighorn River, Green River, and the Snake River.

=== Basins ===
Much of Wyoming is covered with large basins containing different eco-regions, from shrublands to smaller patches of desert. Regions of the state classified as basins contain everything from large geologic formations to sand dunes and vast unpopulated spaces. Basin landscapes are typically at lower elevations and include rolling hills, valleys, mesas, terraces and other rugged terrain, but also include natural springs as well as rivers and artificial reservoirs. They have common plant species such as various subspecies of sagebrush, juniper and grasses such as wheatgrass, but basins are known for their diversity of plant and animal species.

=== Islands ===
Wyoming has 32 named islands; the majority are in Jackson Lake and Yellowstone Lake, within Yellowstone National Park in the northwest portion of the state. The Green River in the southwest also contains a number of islands.

== Regions and administration ==
=== Counties ===
The state of Wyoming has 23 counties. Thirteen were there when Wyoming became a state in 1890 and ten more have been created since then.

The 23 counties of the state of Wyoming
Rank	County	Population	Rank	County	Population
1	Laramie	98,327	13	Converse	13,809
2	Natrona	79,547	14	Goshen	13,378
3	Campbell	46,242	15	Big Horn	11,906
4	Sweetwater	43,534	16	Sublette	9,799
5	Fremont	39,803	17	Platte	8,562
6	Albany	38,332	18	Johnson	8,476
7	Sheridan	30,210	19	Washakie	8,064
8	Park	29,568	20	Crook	7,410
9	Teton	23,265	21	Weston	6,927
10	Uinta	20,495	22	Hot Springs	4,696
11	Lincoln	19,265	23	Niobrara	2,397
12	Carbon	15,303	Wyoming Total		579,315

Wyoming license plates have a number on the left that indicates the county where the vehicle is registered, ranked by an earlier census. Specifically, the numbers are representative of the property values of the counties in 1930. The county license plate numbers are:

License Plate Prefix	County	License Plate Prefix	County	License Plate Prefix	County
1	Natrona	9	Big Horn	17	Campbell
2	Laramie	10	Fremont	18	Crook
3	Sheridan	11	Park	19	Uinta
4	Sweetwater	12	Lincoln	20	Washakie
5	Albany	13	Converse	21	Weston
6	Carbon	14	Niobrara	22	Teton
7	Goshen	15	Hot Springs	23	Sublette
8	Platte	16	Johnson		

=== Cities and towns ===
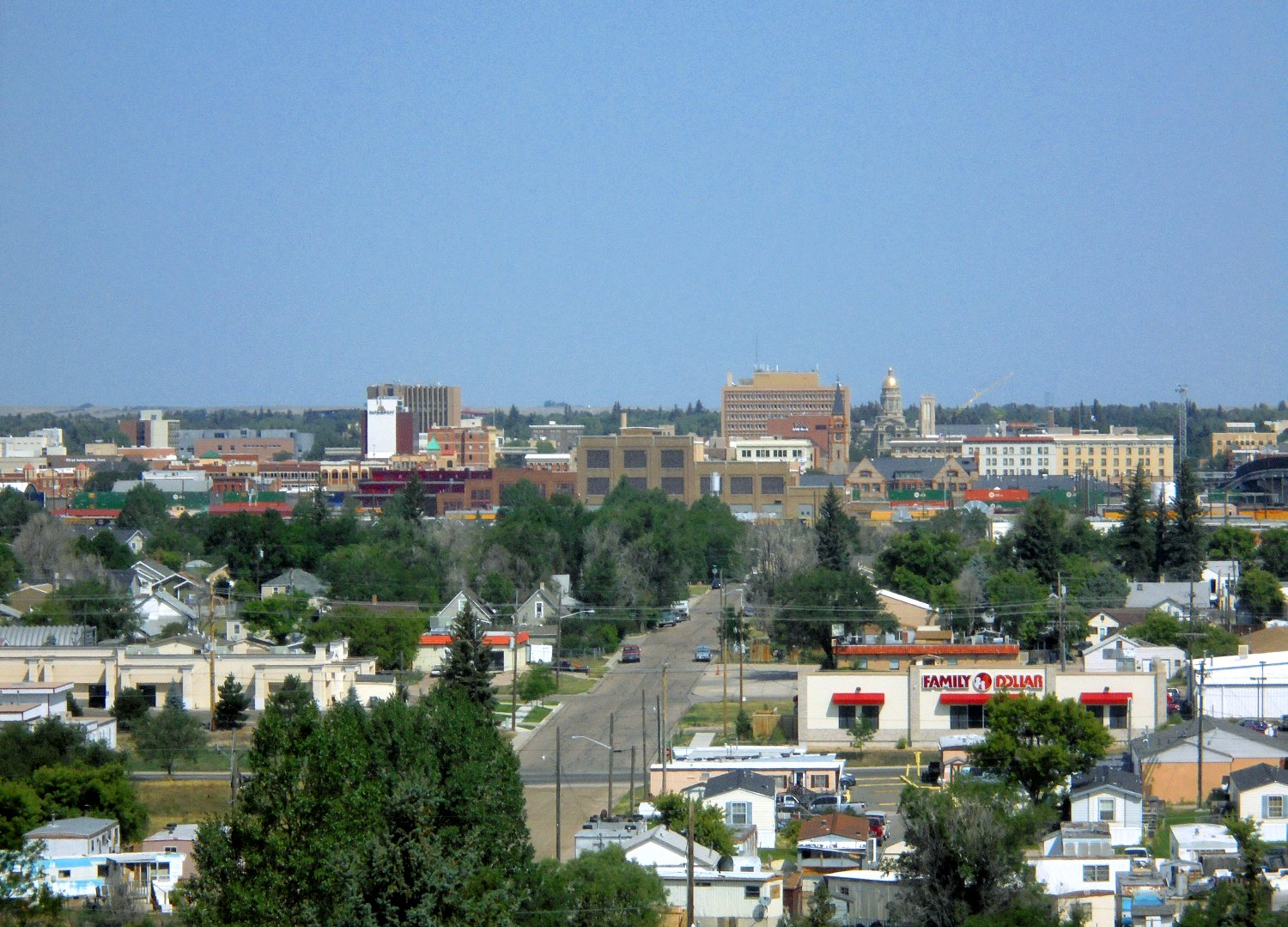
Cheyenne, Wyoming

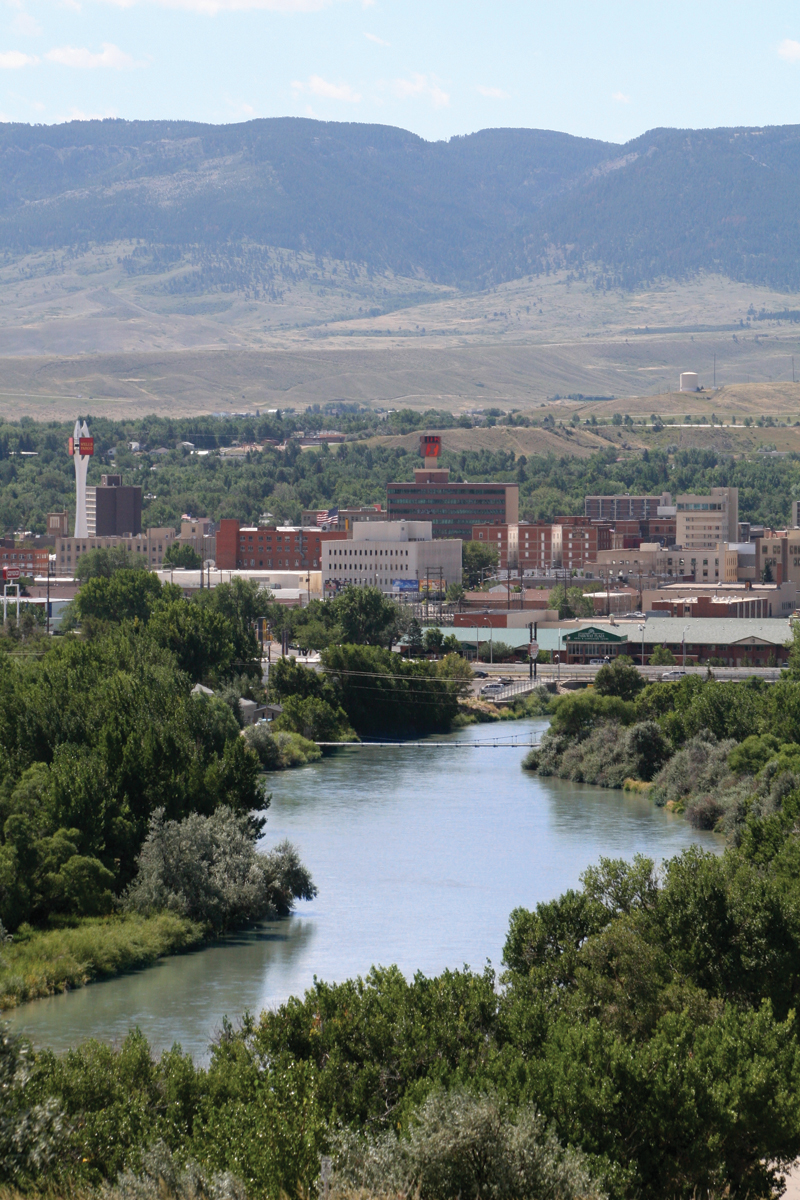
Casper, Wyoming

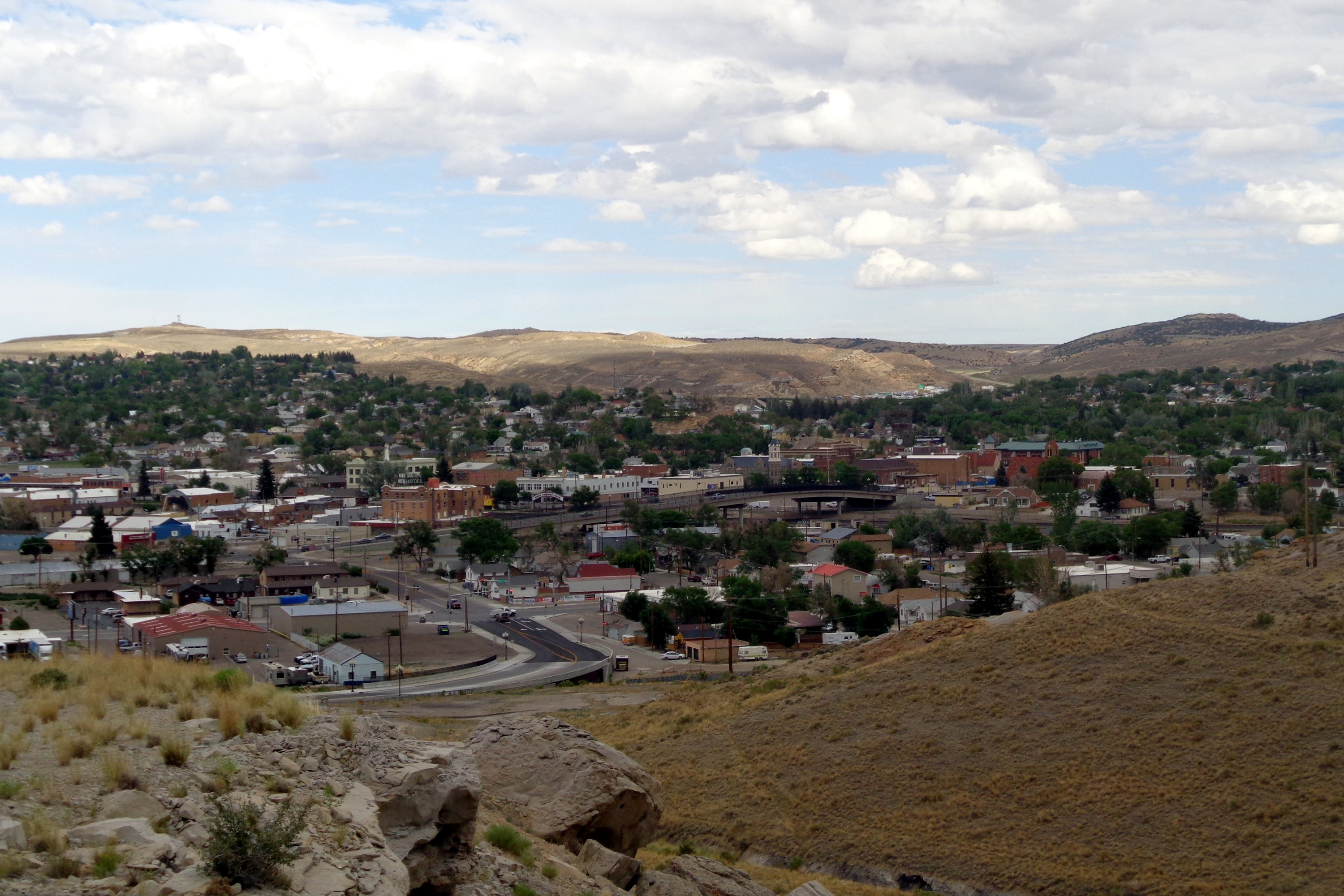
Rock Springs, Wyoming

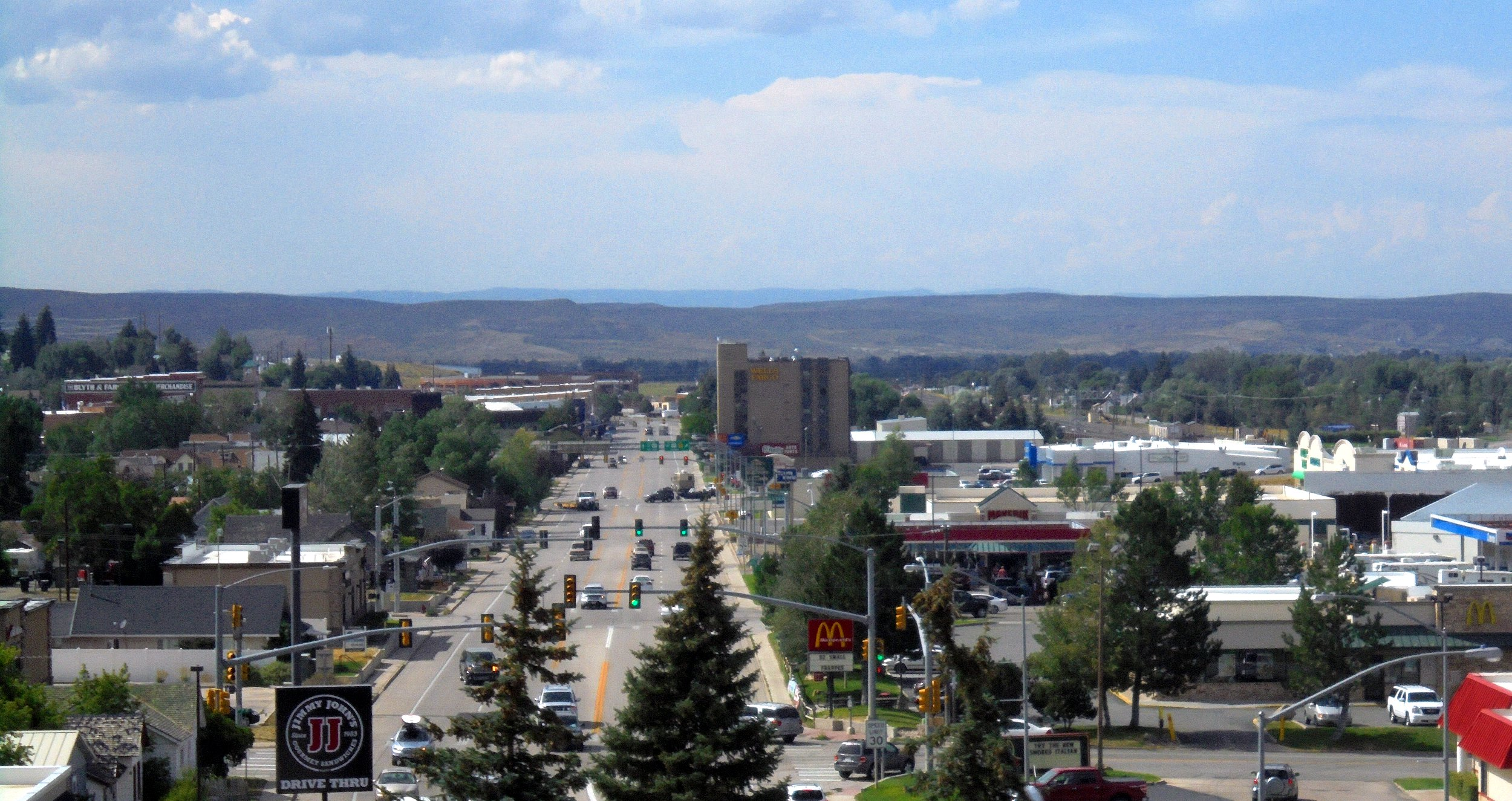
Evanston, Wyoming

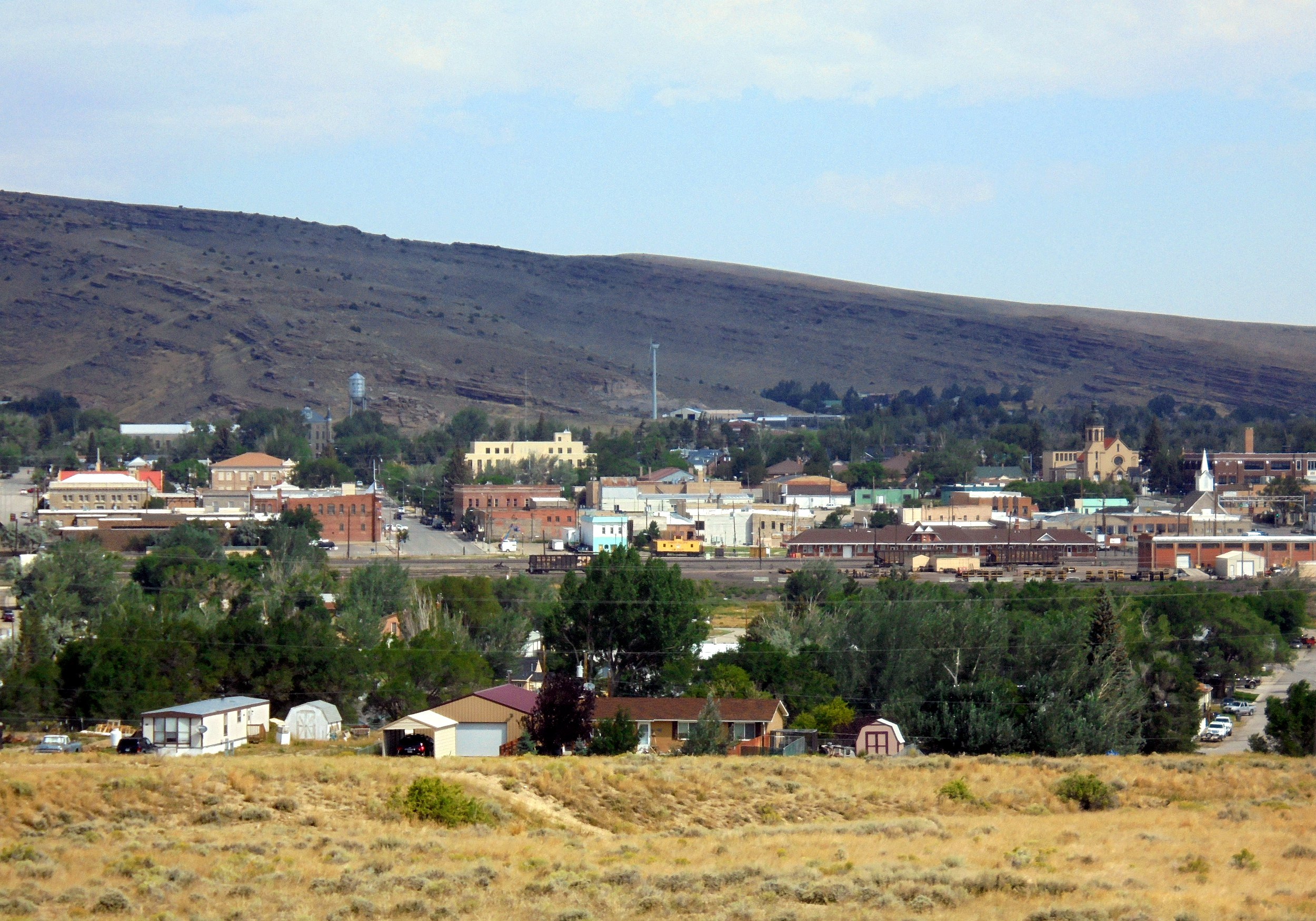
Rawlins, Wyoming

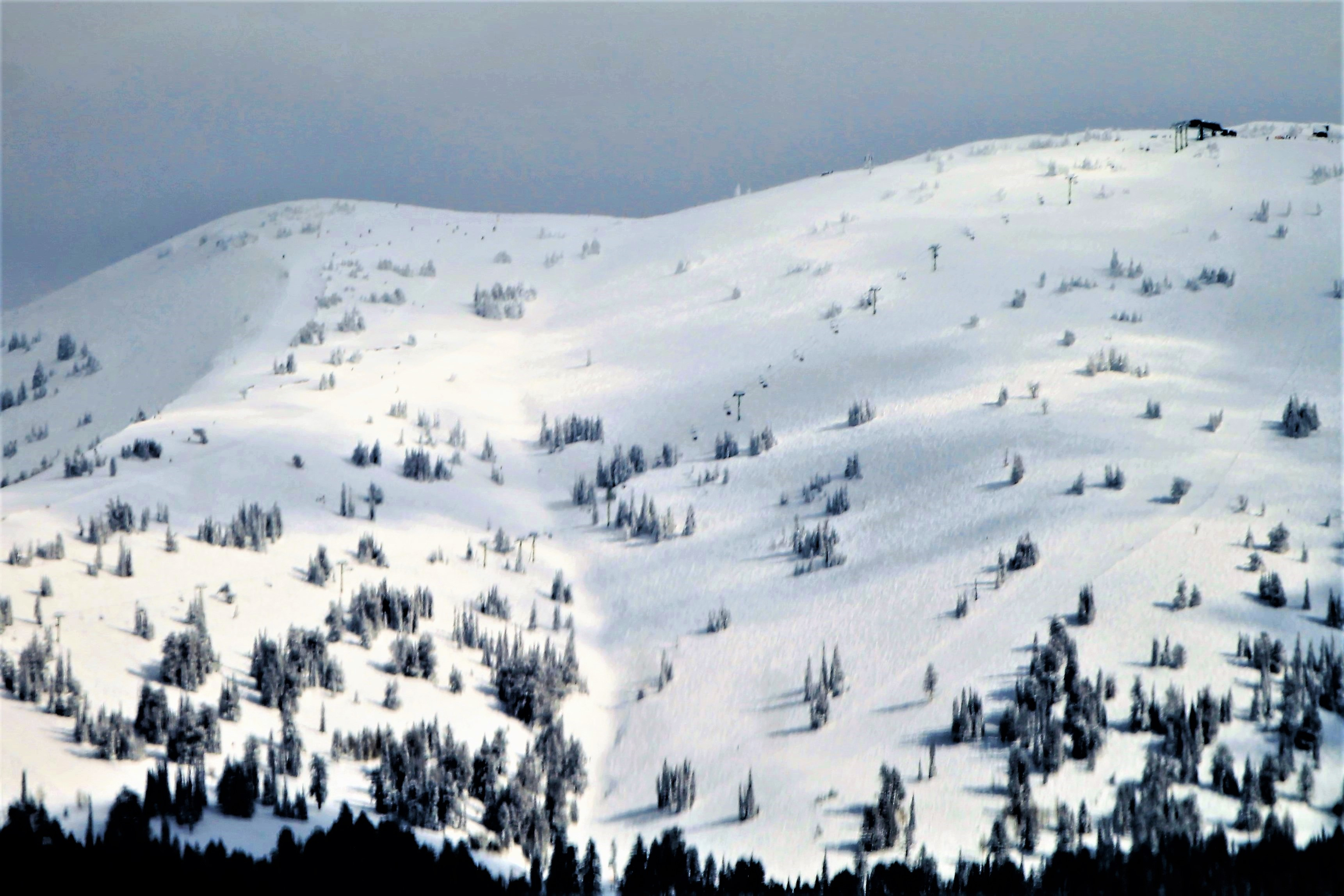
Wyoming is home to 12 ski resorts, including Grand Targhee and Jackson Hole.

The State of Wyoming has 99 incorporated municipalities.

Most Populous Wyoming Cities and Towns
Rank	City	County	Population
1	Cheyenne	Laramie	63,957
2	Casper	Natrona	57,461
3	Laramie	Albany	32,473
4	Gillette	Campbell	31,903
5	Rock Springs	Sweetwater	23,082
6	Sheridan	Sheridan	17,849
7	Green River	Sweetwater	11,978
8	Evanston	Uinta	11,704
9	Riverton	Fremont	10,996
10	Jackson	Teton	10,429
11	Cody	Park	9,828
12	Rawlins	Carbon	8,658
13	Lander	Fremont	7,503
14	Torrington	Goshen	6,701
15	Powell	Park	6,310
16	Douglas	Converse	6,273

In 2005, 50.6% of Wyomingites lived in one of the 13 most populous Wyoming municipalities.

=== Metropolitan areas ===
The United States Census Bureau has defined two Metropolitan Statistical Areas (MSA) and seven Micropolitan Statistical Areas (MiSA) for the State of Wyoming. In 2008, 30.4% of Wyomingites lived in either of the Metropolitan Statistical Areas, and 73% lived in either a Metropolitan Statistical Area or a Micropolitan Statistical Area.

Metropolitan and Micropolitan Statistical Areas
Census Area	County	Population
Cheyenne	Laramie	98,976
Casper	Natrona	79,115
Gillette	Campbell	46,140
Rock Springs	Sweetwater	43,051
Riverton	Fremont	39,531
Laramie	Albany	38,601
Jackson	Teton County, Wyoming	23,081
Jackson	Teton County, Idaho	11,640
Jackson	Total	34,721
Sheridan	Sheridan	30,233
Evanston	Uinta	20,299

== See also ==
- Rocky Mountains
- Geography of Montana
- Continental Divide
