= Core-based statistical area =

Statistical area of the United States

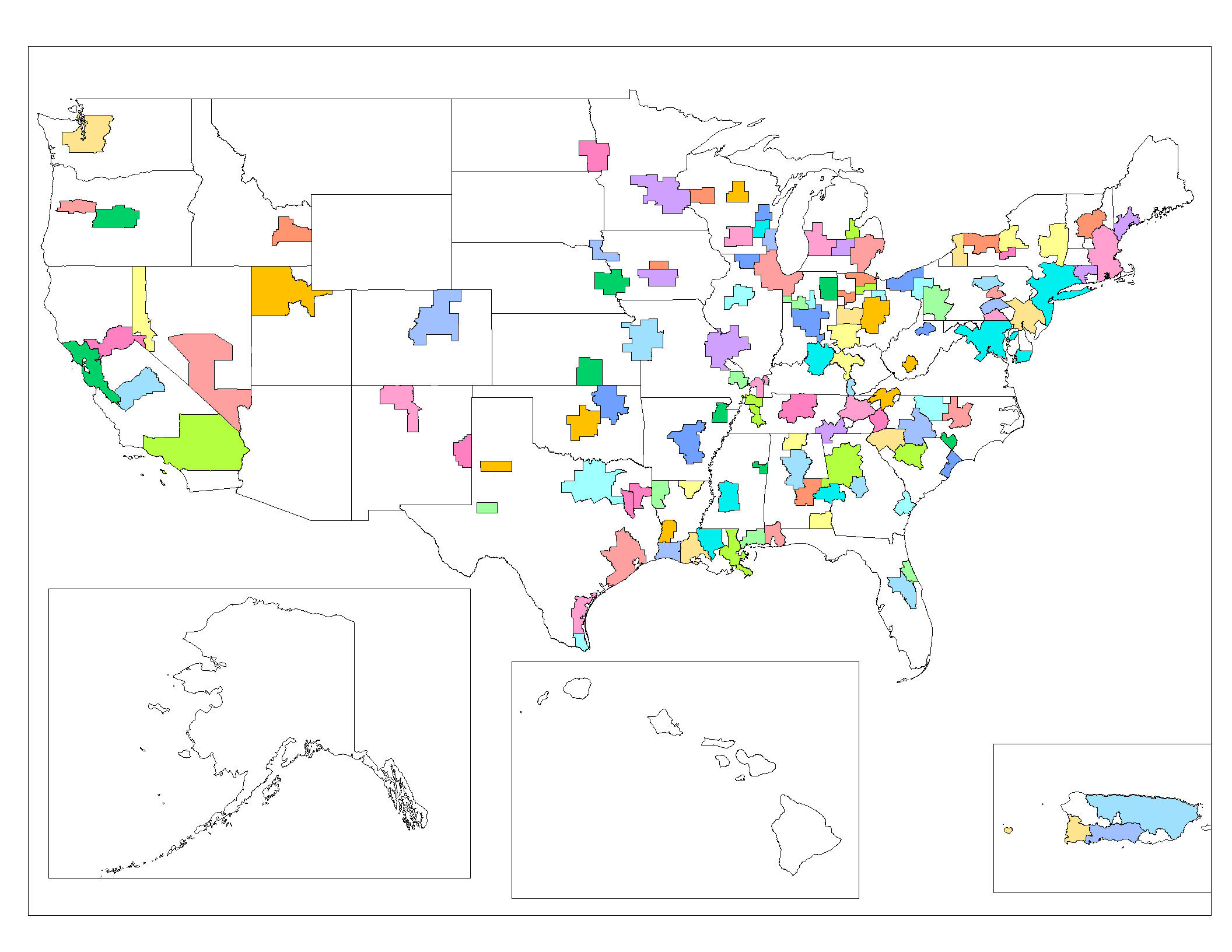
An enlargeable map of the 124 combined statistical areas (CSAs) of the United States as of 2006

A core-based statistical area (CBSA) is a U.S. geographic area defined by the Office of Management and Budget (OMB). It contains a large population nucleus, or urban area, and adjacent communities that have a high degree of integration with that nucleus.

On July 15, 2015, the OMB released new standards based on the 2010 census. These standards are used to replace the definitions of metropolitan areas from the 2010 United States census data.

== Definition ==
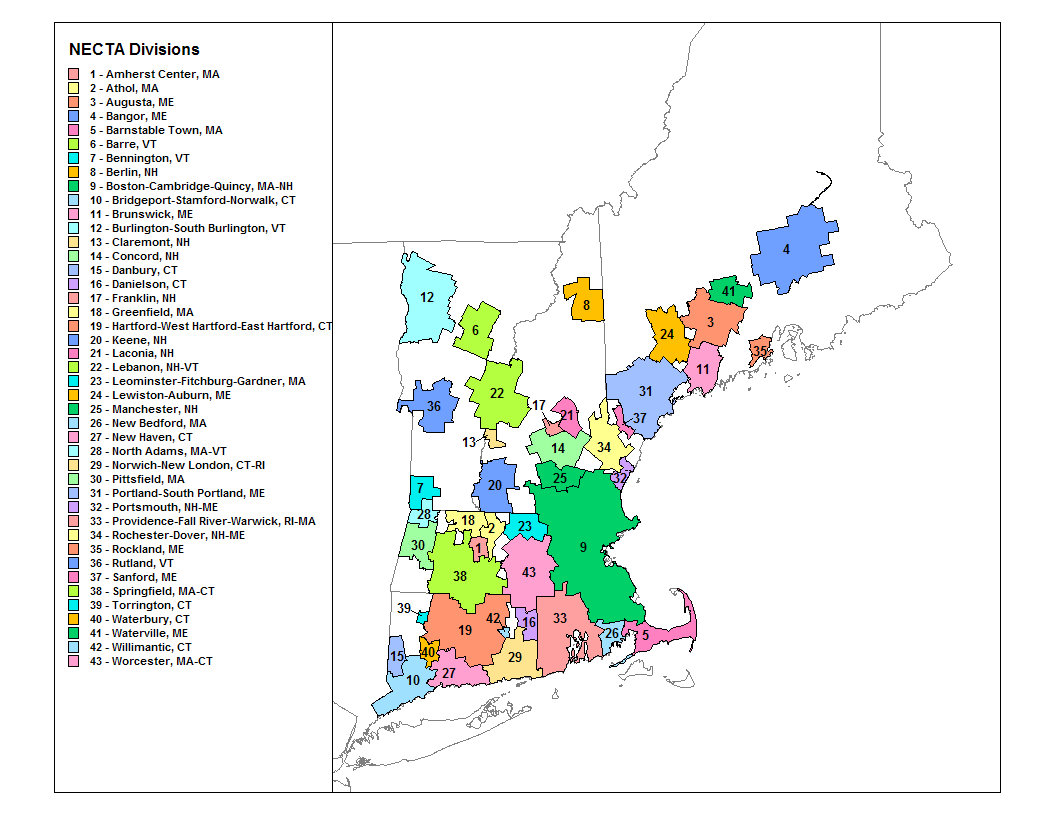
An enlargeable map of the New England city and town areas (NECTAs) of the United States

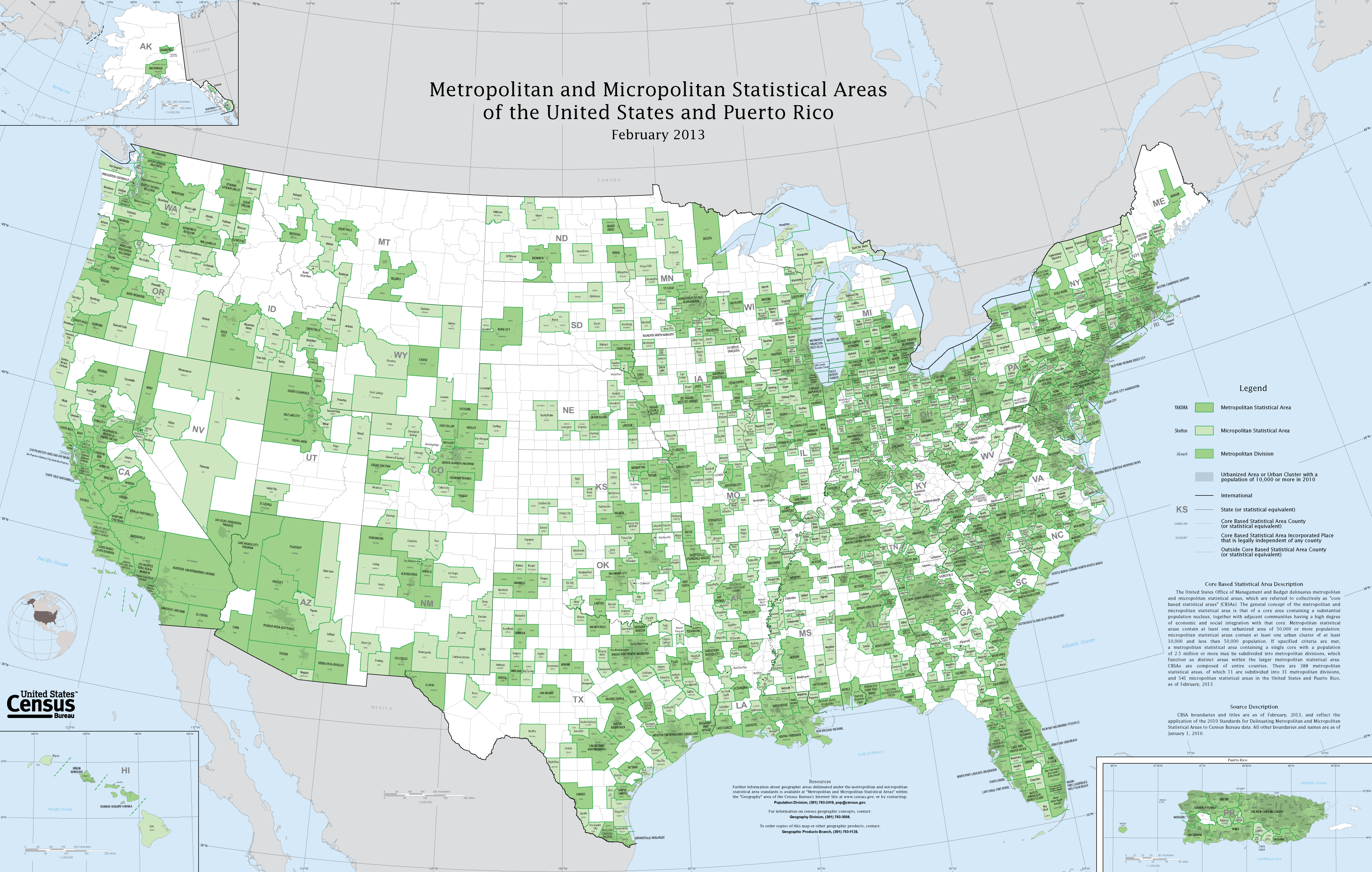
An enlargeable map of the 929 core-based statistical areas (CBSAs) of the United States and Puerto Rico. The 388 metropolitan statistical areas (MSAs) are shown in dark green. The 541 micropolitan statistical areas (μSAs) are shown in light green.

The term "CBSA" refers collectively to both metropolitan statistical areas and micropolitan areas. Micropolitan areas are based on Census Bureau-defined urban clusters of at least 10,000 and fewer than 50,000 people.

The basic definition of metropolitan areas was changed in 2003. A metropolitan area, as it did in 1990, requires a Census Bureau-defined urbanized area of at least 50,000 people. A metropolitan statistical area containing an urbanized area of at least 2.5 million people can be subdivided into two or more "metropolitan divisions", provided specified criteria are met. Metropolitan divisions are conceptually similar to the primary metropolitan statistical areas (PMSAs) defined under previous standards.

Similarly, there are now definitions for combined statistical areas (CSAs). These areas can be formed when adjoining CBSAs meet particular standards to become new areas. Any combination of metro and micro areas may be used to form a CSA.

The metropolitan areas in New England became county-based, consistent with the rest of the U.S. Previously, these were referred to by the Census Bureau as New England county metropolitan areas (NECMA) and were separate from the normal census counts for the areas, based on cities and towns. They have essentially swapped places now, with the city and town areas (or NECTAs, for New England city and town areas) being the separate listings.

Not much changed in the basic definition, but 49 new metropolitan areas were formed. Over 550 other areas were classified as micropolitan. The rules have defined 935 CBSAs in the U.S. and Puerto Rico. Eleven of the CBSAs have metropolitan divisions, 29 in total. In comparison, the definition of metropolitan areas in 1999, the last year areas were formed based on the 1990 rules for them, has 284 metropolitan areas, with 19 of the areas providing 76 primary metropolitan areas (the equivalent of divisions). Almost three times the number of areas overall are recognized by the OMB.

== See also ==
- United States of America
  - Outline of the United States
- Demographics of the United States
  - United States Census Bureau
    - List of U.S. states and territories by population
    - List of United States cities by population
    - List of United States counties and county equivalents
  - United States Office of Management and Budget
    - Statistical area (United States)
      - Combined statistical area
      - List of core-based statistical areas
        - Metropolitan statistical area
        - Micropolitan statistical area
