= Idaho statistical areas =

Coordinates: 44.3509°N 114.6130°W

The U.S. State of Idaho currently has 22 statistical areas that have been delineated by the Office of Management and Budget (OMB). On July 21, 2023, the OMB delineated five combined statistical areas, seven metropolitan statistical areas, and 10 micropolitan statistical areas in Idaho. As of 2025, the largest of these is the Boise City–Mountain Home–Ontario, ID-OR CSA, anchored by Idaho's capital and largest city, Boise.

== Statistical areas ==
The Office of Management and Budget (OMB) has designated more than 1,000 statistical areas for the United States and Puerto Rico. These statistical areas are important geographic delineations of population clusters used by the OMB, the United States Census Bureau, planning organizations, and federal, state, and local government entities.

The OMB defines a core-based statistical area (commonly referred to as a CBSA) as the county or counties (or county-equivalents) surrounding at least one densely-settled core of at least 10,000 population, "plus adjacent counties having a high degree of social and economic integration with the core as measured through commuting ties with the counties containing the core". The OMB further divides core-based statistical areas based on population into metropolitan statistical areas (MSAs) for those with at least 50,000 and micropolitan statistical areas (μSAs) for those with 10,000 to 49,999 people.

The OMB defines a combined statistical area (CSA) as two or more adjacent core-based statistical areas where the employment interchange rate (% commuting from A to B plus % commuting from B to A) is at least 15%. The primary statistical areas (PSAs) include all combined statistical areas and any core-based statistical area that is not a constituent of a combined statistical area.

The 22 United States statistical areas and 44 counties of the State of Idaho (Note: An out-of-state area and its population are displayed in green. An area that extends into more than one state is displayed in purple. A purple population number over a black population number show the total population versus the in-state population. The state's abbreviation is also shown next to the in-state total.)
Combined statistical area	2025 population (est.)	Core-based statistical area	2025 population (est.)	County	2025 population (est.)
Boise City–Mountain Home–Ontario, ID-OR CSA	953,793; 921,532 (ID)	Boise City, ID MSA	864,243	Ada County, Idaho	546,141
Boise City–Mountain Home–Ontario, ID-OR CSA	953,793; 921,532 (ID)	Boise City, ID MSA	864,243	Canyon County, Idaho	275,123
Boise City–Mountain Home–Ontario, ID-OR CSA	953,793; 921,532 (ID)	Boise City, ID MSA	864,243	Gem County, Idaho	21,773
Boise City–Mountain Home–Ontario, ID-OR CSA	953,793; 921,532 (ID)	Boise City, ID MSA	864,243	Owyhee County, Idaho	12,661
Boise City–Mountain Home–Ontario, ID-OR CSA	953,793; 921,532 (ID)	Boise City, ID MSA	864,243	Boise County, Idaho	8,545
Boise City–Mountain Home–Ontario, ID-OR CSA	953,793; 921,532 (ID)	Ontario, OR-ID μSA	60,085; 27,824 (ID)	Malheur County, Oregon	32,261
Boise City–Mountain Home–Ontario, ID-OR CSA	953,793; 921,532 (ID)	Ontario, OR-ID μSA	60,085; 27,824 (ID)	Payette County, Idaho	27,824
Boise City–Mountain Home–Ontario, ID-OR CSA	953,793; 921,532 (ID)	Mountain Home, ID μSA	29,465	Elmore County, Idaho	29,465
Idaho Falls–Rexburg–Blackfoot, ID CSA	294,384	Idaho Falls, ID MSA	173,851	Bonneville County, Idaho	135,771
Idaho Falls–Rexburg–Blackfoot, ID CSA	294,384	Idaho Falls, ID MSA	173,851	Jefferson County, Idaho	35,297
Idaho Falls–Rexburg–Blackfoot, ID CSA	294,384	Idaho Falls, ID MSA	173,851	Butte County, Idaho	2,783
Idaho Falls–Rexburg–Blackfoot, ID CSA	294,384	Rexburg, ID μSA	69,380	Madison County, Idaho	55,172
Idaho Falls–Rexburg–Blackfoot, ID CSA	294,384	Rexburg, ID μSA	69,380	Fremont County, Idaho	14,208
Idaho Falls–Rexburg–Blackfoot, ID CSA	294,384	Blackfoot, ID μSA	51,153	Bingham County, Idaho	51,153
Spokane–Spokane Valley–Coeur d'Alene, WA-ID CSA	799,876; 191,864 (ID)	Spokane–Spokane Valley, WA MSA	608,012	Spokane County, Washington	558,344
Spokane–Spokane Valley–Coeur d'Alene, WA-ID CSA	799,876; 191,864 (ID)	Spokane–Spokane Valley, WA MSA	608,012	Stevens County, Washington	49,668
Spokane–Spokane Valley–Coeur d'Alene, WA-ID CSA	799,876; 191,864 (ID)	Coeur d'Alene, ID MSA	191,864	Kootenai County, Idaho	191,864
none		Twin Falls, ID MSA	123,901	Twin Falls County, Idaho	97,539
none		Twin Falls, ID MSA	123,901	Jerome County, Idaho	26,362
none		Pocatello, ID MSA	91,591	Bannock County, Idaho	91,591
none		Sandpoint, ID μSA	54,420	Bonner County, Idaho	54,420
none		Burley, ID μSA	49,308	Cassia County, Idaho	26,397
none		Burley, ID μSA	49,308	Minidoka County, Idaho	22,911
none		Lewiston, ID-WA MSA	65,450; 42,905 (ID)	Nez Perce County, Idaho	42,905
none		Lewiston, ID-WA MSA	65,450; 42,905 (ID)	Asotin County, Washington	22,545
Pullman–Moscow, WA-ID CSA	90,354; 41,842 (ID)	Pullman, WA μSA	48,512	Whitman County, Washington	48,512
Pullman–Moscow, WA-ID CSA	90,354; 41,842 (ID)	Moscow, ID μSA	41,842	Latah County, Idaho	41,842
none		Hailey, ID μSA	32,436	Blaine County, Idaho	25,517
none		Hailey, ID μSA	32,436	Lincoln County, Idaho	5,603
none		Hailey, ID μSA	32,436	Camas County, Idaho	1,316
none		Logan, UT-ID MSA	160,889; 15,889 (ID)	Cache County, Utah	145,000
none		Logan, UT-ID MSA	160,889; 15,889 (ID)	Franklin County, Idaho	15,889
none		Jackson, WY-ID μSA	36,587; 13,254 (ID)	Teton County, Wyoming	23,333
none		Jackson, WY-ID μSA	36,587; 13,254 (ID)	Teton County, Idaho	13,254
Salt Lake City–Provo–Orem, UT-ID CSA	2,906,647; 5,085 (ID)	Salt Lake City–Murray, UT MSA	1,308,377	Salt Lake County, Utah	1,220,916
Salt Lake City–Provo–Orem, UT-ID CSA	2,906,647; 5,085 (ID)	Salt Lake City–Murray, UT MSA	1,308,377	Tooele County, Utah	87,461
Salt Lake City–Provo–Orem, UT-ID CSA	2,906,647; 5,085 (ID)	Provo–Orem–Lehi, UT MSA	773,426	Utah County, Utah	759,859
Salt Lake City–Provo–Orem, UT-ID CSA	2,906,647; 5,085 (ID)	Provo–Orem–Lehi, UT MSA	773,426	Juab County, Utah	13,567
Salt Lake City–Provo–Orem, UT-ID CSA	2,906,647; 5,085 (ID)	Ogden, UT MSA	672,784	Davis County, Utah	381,227
Salt Lake City–Provo–Orem, UT-ID CSA	2,906,647; 5,085 (ID)	Ogden, UT MSA	672,784	Weber County, Utah	278,174
Salt Lake City–Provo–Orem, UT-ID CSA	2,906,647; 5,085 (ID)	Ogden, UT MSA	672,784	Morgan County, Utah	13,383
Salt Lake City–Provo–Orem, UT-ID CSA	2,906,647; 5,085 (ID)	Heber, UT μSA	81,655	Summit County, Utah	43,141
Salt Lake City–Provo–Orem, UT-ID CSA	2,906,647; 5,085 (ID)	Heber, UT μSA	81,655	Wasatch County, Utah	38,514
Salt Lake City–Provo–Orem, UT-ID CSA	2,906,647; 5,085 (ID)	Brigham City, UT-ID μSA	70,405; 5,085 (ID)	Box Elder County, Utah	65,320
Salt Lake City–Provo–Orem, UT-ID CSA	2,906,647; 5,085 (ID)	Brigham City, UT-ID μSA	70,405; 5,085 (ID)	Oneida County, Idaho	5,085
none				Idaho County, Idaho	17,874
none				Gooding County, Idaho	16,446
none				Shoshone County, Idaho	14,130
none				Boundary County, Idaho	13,997
none				Valley County, Idaho	12,831
none				Washington County, Idaho	11,583
none				Benewah County, Idaho	10,508
none				Clearwater County, Idaho	9,118
none				Lemhi County, Idaho	8,474
none				Power County, Idaho	8,246
none				Caribou County, Idaho	7,252
none				Bear Lake County, Idaho	6,727
none				Adams County, Idaho	5,013
none				Custer County, Idaho	4,636
none				Lewis County, Idaho	3,704
none				Clark County, Idaho	783
State of Idaho					2,029,733

The 17 core-based statistical areas of the State of Idaho (Note: For PSAs comprising populations from multiple states, they are listed twice to show both their intrastate population within that PSA as well as the PSA's total population. Only the intrastate population is ranked.)
2025 rank	Primary statistical area	Population				
2025 rank	Primary statistical area	2025 estimate	Change	2020 Census	Change	2010 Census
1	Boise City, ID MSA	864,243	+13.01%	764,718	+24.03%	616,561
2	Coeur d'Alene, ID MSA	191,864	+11.96%	171,362	+23.73%	138,494
3	Idaho Falls, ID MSA	173,851	+10.43%	157,429	+18.13%	133,265
4	Twin Falls, ID MSA	123,901	+8.42%	114,283	+14.74%	99,604
5	Pocatello, ID MSA	91,591	+5.26%	87,018	+5.04%	82,839
6	Rexburg, ID μSA	69,380	+4.64%	66,301	+30.57%	50,778
7	Sandpoint, ID μSA	54,420	+15.52%	47,110	+15.25%	40,877
8	Blackfoot, ID μSA	51,153	+6.59%	47,992	+5.23%	45,607
9	Burley, ID μSA	49,308	+6.57%	46,268	+7.55%	43,021
10	Lewiston, ID-WA MSA (ID)	42,905	+1.94%	42,090	+7.19%	39,265
11	Moscow, ID μSA	41,842	+5.88%	39,517	+6.10%	37,244
12	Hailey, ID μSA	32,436	+6.43%	30,476	+10.02%	27,701
13	Mountain Home, ID μSA	29,465	+2.79%	28,666	+6.02%	27,038
14	Ontario, OR-ID μSA (ID)	27,824	+9.60%	25,386	+12.21%	22,623
15	Logan, UT-ID MSA (ID)	15,889	+11.94%	14,194	+11.01%	12,786
16	Jackson, WY-ID μSA (ID)	13,254	+13.96%	11,630	+14.36%	10,170
17	Brigham City, UT-ID μSA (ID)	5,085	+11.42%	4,564	+6.49%	4,286
	Brigham City, UT-ID μSA	70,405	+13.14%	62,230	+14.69%	54,261
	Jackson, WY-ID μSA	36,587	+4.65%	34,961	+11.11%	31,464
	Lewiston, ID-WA MSA	65,450	+1.67%	64,375	+5.73%	60,888
	Logan, UT-ID MSA	160,889	+9.19%	147,348	+17.46%	125,442
	Ontario, OR-ID μSA	60,085	+5.49%	56,957	+5.60%	53,936

The five combined statistical areas of the State of Idaho (Note: For CSAs comprising populations from multiple states, they are listed twice to show both their intrastate population within that CSA as well as the CSA's total population. Only the intrastate population is ranked.)
2025 rank	Combined statistical area	Population				
2025 rank	Combined statistical area	2025 estimate	Change	2020 Census	Change	2010 Census
1	Boise City–Mountain Home–Ontario, ID-OR CSA (ID)	921,532	+12.55%	818,770	+22.90%	666,222
2	Idaho Falls–Rexburg–Blackfoot, ID CSA	294,384	+8.34%	271,722	+18.32%	229,650
3	Spokane–Spokane Valley–Coeur d'Alene, WA-ID CSA (ID)	191,864	+11.96%	171,362	+23.73%	138,494
4	Pullman–Moscow, WA-ID CSA (ID)	41,842	+5.88%	39,517	+6.10%	37,244
5	Salt Lake City–Provo–Orem, UT-ID CSA (ID)	5,085	+11.42%	4,564	+6.49%	4,286
	Boise City–Mountain Home–Ontario, ID-OR CSA	953,753	+12.16%	850,341	+21.91%	697,535
	Pullman–Moscow, WA-ID CSA	90,354	+3.27%	87,490	+6.67%	82,020
	Salt Lake City–Provo–Orem, UT-ID CSA	2,906,647	+7.43%	2,705,693	+18.88%	2,275,982
	Spokane–Spokane Valley–Coeur d'Alene, WA-ID CSA	799,876	+5.64%	757,146	+15.91%	653,246

== See also ==
- Geography of Idaho
  - Demographics of Idaho
