= Washington (state) statistical areas =

Coordinates: 47.3826°N 120.4472°W

The U.S. state of Washington has 29 statistical areas that have been delineated by the Office of Management and Budget (OMB). On July 21, 2023, the OMB delineated six combined statistical areas, 13 metropolitan statistical areas, and ten micropolitan statistical areas in Washington. As of 2025, the largest of these is the Seattle–Tacoma, WA CSA, anchored by Washington's largest city, Seattle and including its capital, Olympia.

The state historically had three metropolitan areas: Seattle, Spokane, and Tacoma. Seattle and Tacoma were eventually merged, while other metropolitan areas were added in the 1970s and 1980s. There are 13 metropolitan areas that include areas in Washington; the largest is Seattle–Tacoma–Bellevue, which includes half of the state's population.

== Statistical areas ==
The Office of Management and Budget (OMB) has designated more than 1,000 statistical areas for the United States and Puerto Rico. These statistical areas are important geographic delineations of population clusters used by the OMB, the United States Census Bureau, planning organizations, and federal, state, and local government entities.

The OMB defines a core-based statistical area (commonly referred to as a CBSA) as the county or counties (or county-equivalents) surrounding at least one densely-settled core of at least 10,000 population, "plus adjacent counties having a high degree of social and economic integration with the core as measured through commuting ties with the counties containing the core". The OMB further divides core-based statistical areas based on population into metropolitan statistical areas (MSAs) for those with at least 50,000 and micropolitan statistical areas (μSAs) for those with 10,000 to 49,999 people.

The OMB defines a combined statistical area (CSA) as two or more adjacent core-based statistical areas where the employment interchange rate (% commuting from A to B plus % commuting from B to A) is at least 15%. The primary statistical areas (PSAs) include all combined statistical areas and any core-based statistical area that is not a constituent of a combined statistical area.

The 29 United States statistical areas and 39 counties of the State of Washington (Note: An out-of-state area and its population are displayed in green. An area that extends into more than one state is displayed in purple. A purple population number over a black population number show the total population versus the in-state population. The state's abbreviation is also shown next to the in-state total.)
| Combined statistical area | 2025 population (est.) | Core-based statistical area | 2025 population (est.) | County | 2025 population (est.) | Metropolitan division | 2025 population (est.) |
|---|---|---|---|---|---|---|---|
| Seattle–Tacoma, WA CSA | 5,127,377 | Seattle–Tacoma–Bellevue, WA MSA | 4,161,883 | King County, Washington | 2,344,939 | Seattle–Bellevue–Kent, WA MD | 2,344,939 |
| Seattle–Tacoma, WA CSA | 5,127,377 | Seattle–Tacoma–Bellevue, WA MSA | 4,161,883 | Pierce County, Washington | 946,288 | Tacoma–Lakewood, WA MD | 946,288 |
| Seattle–Tacoma, WA CSA | 5,127,377 | Seattle–Tacoma–Bellevue, WA MSA | 4,161,883 | Snohomish County, Washington | 870,656 | Everett, WA MD | 870,656 |
| Seattle–Tacoma, WA CSA | 5,127,377 | Olympia–Lacey–Tumwater, WA MSA | 304,261 | Thurston County, Washington | 304,261 | none | |
| Seattle–Tacoma, WA CSA | 5,127,377 | Bremerton–Silverdale–Port Orchard, WA MSA | 283,374 | Kitsap County, Washington | 283,374 | none | |
| Seattle–Tacoma, WA CSA | 5,127,377 | Mount Vernon–Anacortes, WA MSA | 132,975 | Skagit County, Washington | 132,975 | none | |
| Seattle–Tacoma, WA CSA | 5,127,377 | Centralia, WA μSA | 88,062 | Lewis County, Washington | 88,062 | none | |
| Seattle–Tacoma, WA CSA | 5,127,377 | Oak Harbor, WA μSA | 85,657 | Island County, Washington | 85,657 | none | |
| Seattle–Tacoma, WA CSA | 5,127,377 | Shelton, WA μSA | 71,165 | Mason County, Washington | 71,165 | none | |
| Portland–Vancouver–Salem, OR-WA CSA | 3,333,552; 659,673 (WA) | Portland–Vancouver–Hillsboro, OR-WA MSA | 2,542,282; 544,788 (WA) | Multnomah County, Oregon | 795,391 | none | |
| Portland–Vancouver–Salem, OR-WA CSA | 3,333,552; 659,673 (WA) | Portland–Vancouver–Hillsboro, OR-WA MSA | 2,542,282; 544,788 (WA) | Washington County, Oregon | 611,708 | none | |
| Portland–Vancouver–Salem, OR-WA CSA | 3,333,552; 659,673 (WA) | Portland–Vancouver–Hillsboro, OR-WA MSA | 2,542,282; 544,788 (WA) | Clark County, Washington | 532,119 | none | |
| Portland–Vancouver–Salem, OR-WA CSA | 3,333,552; 659,673 (WA) | Portland–Vancouver–Hillsboro, OR-WA MSA | 2,542,282; 544,788 (WA) | Clackamas County, Oregon | 426,280 | none | |
| Portland–Vancouver–Salem, OR-WA CSA | 3,333,552; 659,673 (WA) | Portland–Vancouver–Hillsboro, OR-WA MSA | 2,542,282; 544,788 (WA) | Yamhill County, Oregon | 110,024 | none | |
| Portland–Vancouver–Salem, OR-WA CSA | 3,333,552; 659,673 (WA) | Portland–Vancouver–Hillsboro, OR-WA MSA | 2,542,282; 544,788 (WA) | Columbia County, Oregon | 54,091 | none | |
| Portland–Vancouver–Salem, OR-WA CSA | 3,333,552; 659,673 (WA) | Portland–Vancouver–Hillsboro, OR-WA MSA | 2,542,282; 544,788 (WA) | Skamania County, Washington | 12,669 | none | |
| Portland–Vancouver–Salem, OR-WA CSA | 3,333,552; 659,673 (WA) | Salem, OR MSA | 445,814 | Marion County, Oregon | 355,777 | none | |
| Portland–Vancouver–Salem, OR-WA CSA | 3,333,552; 659,673 (WA) | Salem, OR MSA | 445,814 | Polk County, Oregon | 90,037 | none | |
| Portland–Vancouver–Salem, OR-WA CSA | 3,333,552; 659,673 (WA) | Albany, OR MSA | 132,843 | Linn County, Oregon | 132,843 | none | |
| Portland–Vancouver–Salem, OR-WA CSA | 3,333,552; 659,673 (WA) | Longview–Kelso, WA MSA | 114,885 | Cowlitz County, Washington | 114,885 | none | |
| Portland–Vancouver–Salem, OR-WA CSA | 3,333,552; 659,673 (WA) | Corvallis, OR MSA | 97,728 | Benton County, Oregon | 97,728 | none | |
| Spokane–Spokane Valley–Coeur d'Alene, WA-ID CSA | 799,876; 608,012 (WA) | Spokane–Spokane Valley, WA MSA | 608,012 | Spokane County, Washington | 558,344 | none | |
| Spokane–Spokane Valley–Coeur d'Alene, WA-ID CSA | 799,876; 608,012 (WA) | Spokane–Spokane Valley, WA MSA | 608,012 | Stevens County, Washington | 49,668 | none | |
| Spokane–Spokane Valley–Coeur d'Alene, WA-ID CSA | 799,876; 608,012 (WA) | Coeur d'Alene, ID MSA | 191,864 | Kootenai County, Idaho | 191,864 | none | |
| Kennewick–Richland–Walla Walla, WA CSA | 386,695 | Kennewick–Richland, WA MSA | 324,334 | Benton County, Washington | 221,722 | none | |
| Kennewick–Richland–Walla Walla, WA CSA | 386,695 | Kennewick–Richland, WA MSA | 324,334 | Franklin County, Washington | 102,612 | none | |
| Kennewick–Richland–Walla Walla, WA CSA | 386,695 | Walla Walla, WA MSA | 62,361 | Walla Walla County, Washington | 62,361 | none | |
| none | | Yakima, WA MSA | 259,185 | Yakima County, Washington | 259,185 | none | |
| none | | Bellingham, WA MSA | 236,392 | Whatcom County, Washington | 236,392 | none | |
| none | | Wenatchee–East Wenatchee, WA MSA | 128,414 | Chelan County, Washington | 81,941 | none | |
| none | | Wenatchee–East Wenatchee, WA MSA | 128,414 | Douglas County, Washington | 46,473 | none | |
| Moses Lake–Othello, WA CSA | 127,215 | Moses Lake, WA μSA | 105,727 | Grant County, Washington | 105,727 | none | |
| Moses Lake–Othello, WA CSA | 127,215 | Othello, WA μSA | 21,488 | Adams County, Washington | 21,488 | none | |
| none | | Port Angeles, WA μSA | 78,202 | Clallam County, Washington | 78,202 | none | |
| none | | Aberdeen, WA μSA | 78,144 | Grays Harbor County, Washington | 78,144 | none | |
| Pullman–Moscow, WA-ID CSA | 90,354; 48,512 (WA) | Pullman, WA μSA | 48,512 | Whitman County, Washington | 48,512 | none | |
| Pullman–Moscow, WA-ID CSA | 90,354; 48,512 (WA) | Moscow, ID μSA | 41,842 | Latah County, Idaho | 41,842 | none | |
| none | | Ellensburg, WA μSA | 48,803 | Kittitas County, Washington | 48,803 | none | |
| none | | Port Townsend, WA μSA | 33,970 | Jefferson County, Washington | 33,970 | none | |
| none | | Lewiston, ID-WA MSA | 65,450; 22,545 (WA) | Nez Perce County, Idaho | 42,905 | none | |
| none | | Lewiston, ID-WA MSA | 65,450; 22,545 (WA) | Asotin County, Washington | 22,545 | none | |
| none | | none | | Okanogan County, Washington | 45,230 | none | |
| none | | none | | Pacific County, Washington | 24,357 | none | |
| none | | none | | Klickitat County, Washington | 24,331 | none | |
| none | | none | | San Juan County, Washington | 18,577 | none | |
| none | | none | | Pend Oreille County, Washington | 14,457 | none | |
| none | | none | | Lincoln County, Washington | 11,982 | none | |
| none | | none | | Ferry County, Washington | 7,517 | none | |
| none | | none | | Wahkiakum County, Washington | 4,873 | none | |
| none | | none | | Columbia County, Washington | 4,141 | none | |
| none | | none | | Garfield County, Washington | 2,416 | none | |
| State of Washington | | | | | 8,001,020 | none | |

The 23 core-based statistical areas of the State of Washington (Note: For CBSAs comprising populations from multiple states, they are listed twice to show both their intrastate population within that CBSA as well as the CBSA's total population. Only the intrastate population is ranked.)
| 2025 rank | Core-based statistical area | Population | | | | |
| 2025 rank | Core-based statistical area | 2025 estimate | Change | 2020 Census | Change | 2010 Census |
|---|---|---|---|---|---|---|
| 1 | Seattle–Tacoma–Bellevue, WA MSA | 4,161,883 | +3.56% | 4,018,762 | +16.83% | 3,439,809 |
| 2 | Spokane–Spokane Valley, WA MSA | 608,012 | +3.79% | 585,784 | +13.80% | 514,752 |
| 3 | Portland–Vancouver–Hillsboro, OR-WA MSA (WA) | 544,788 | +5.71% | 515,347 | +18.08% | 436,429 |
| 4 | Kennewick–Richland, WA MSA | 324,334 | +6.82% | 303,622 | +19.85% | 253,340 |
| 5 | Olympia–Lacey–Tumwater, WA MSA | 304,261 | +3.21% | 294,793 | +16.86% | 252,264 |
| 6 | Bremerton–Silverdale–Port Orchard, WA MSA | 283,374 | +2.82% | 275,611 | +9.75% | 251,133 |
| 7 | Yakima, WA MSA | 259,185 | +0.96% | 256,728 | +5.55% | 243,231 |
| 8 | Bellingham, WA MSA | 236,392 | +4.21% | 226,847 | +12.78% | 201,140 |
| 9 | Mount Vernon–Anacortes, WA MSA | 132,975 | +2.67% | 129,523 | +10.80% | 116,901 |
| 10 | Wenatchee–East Wenatchee, WA MSA | 128,414 | +5.25% | 122,012 | +10.04% | 110,884 |
| 11 | Longview–Kelso, WA MSA | 114,885 | +3.75% | 110,730 | +8.12% | 102,410 |
| 12 | Moses Lake, WA μSA | 105,727 | +6.66% | 99,123 | +11.22% | 89,120 |
| 13 | Oak Harbor, WA μSA | 85,657 | −1.38% | 86,857 | +10.64% | 78,506 |
| 14 | Centralia, WA μSA | 88,062 | +7.20% | 82,149 | +8.87% | 75,455 |
| 15 | Port Angeles, WA μSA | 78,202 | +1.36% | 77,155 | +8.05% | 71,404 |
| 16 | Aberdeen, WA μSA | 78,144 | +3.32% | 75,636 | +3.90% | 72,797 |
| 17 | Shelton, WA μSA | 71,165 | +8.28% | 65,726 | +8.28% | 60,699 |
| 18 | Walla Walla, WA MSA | 62,361 | −0.36% | 62,584 | +6.47% | 58,781 |
| 19 | Ellensburg, WA μSA | 48,803 | +10.07% | 44,337 | +8.36% | 40,915 |
| 20 | Pullman, WA μSA | 48,512 | +1.12% | 47,973 | +7.14% | 44,776 |
| 21 | Port Townsend, WA μSA | 33,970 | +3.01% | 32,977 | +10.39% | 29,872 |
| 22 | Lewiston, ID-WA MSA (WA) | 22,545 | +1.17% | 22,285 | +3.06% | 21,623 |
| 23 | Othello, WA μSA | 21,488 | +4.24% | 20,613 | +10.07% | 18,728 |
| | Portland–Vancouver–Hillsboro, OR-WA MSA | 2,542,282 | +1.17% | 2,512,859 | +12.89% | 2,226,009 |
| | Lewiston, ID-WA MSA | 65,450 | +1.67% | 64,375 | +5.73% | 60,888 |

The six combined statistical areas of the State of Washington (Note: For CSAs comprising populations from multiple states, they are listed twice to show both their intrastate population within that CSA as well as the CSA's total population. Only the intrastate population is ranked.)
| 2025 rank | Combined statistical area | Population | | | | |
| 2025 rank | Combined statistical area | 2025 estimate | Change | 2020 Census | Change | 2010 Census |
|---|---|---|---|---|---|---|
| 1 | Seattle–Tacoma, WA CSA | 5,127,377 | +3.51% | 4,953,421 | +15.88% | 4,274,767 |
| 2 | Portland–Vancouver–Salem, OR-WA CSA (WA) | 659,673 | +5.37% | 626,077 | +16.19% | 538,839 |
| 3 | Spokane–Spokane Valley–Coeur d'Alene, WA-ID CSA (WA) | 608,012 | +3.79% | 585,784 | +13.80% | 514,752 |
| 4 | Kennewick–Richland–Walla Walla, WA CSA | 386,695 | +5.59% | 366,206 | +17.33% | 312,121 |
| 5 | Moses Lake–Othello, WA CSA | 127,215 | +6.25% | 119,736 | +11.02% | 107,848 |
| 6 | Pullman–Moscow, WA-ID CSA (WA) | 48,512 | +1.12% | 47,973 | +7.14% | 44,776 |
| | Portland–Vancouver–Salem, OR-WA CSA | 3,333,552 | +1.61% | 3,280,736 | +12.30% | 2,921,408 |
| | Pullman–Moscow, WA-ID CSA | 90,354 | +3.27% | 87,490 | +6.67% | 82,020 |
| | Spokane–Spokane Valley–Coeur d'Alene, WA-ID CSA | 799,876 | +5.64% | 757,146 | +15.91% | 653,246 |

== See also ==
- Geography of Washington (state)
  - Demographics of Washington (state)
