= Moses Lake–Othello combined statistical area =

Moses Lake–Othello Combined Statistical Area
- Combined Statistical Area
- Moses Lake–Othello, WA; Combined Statistical Area
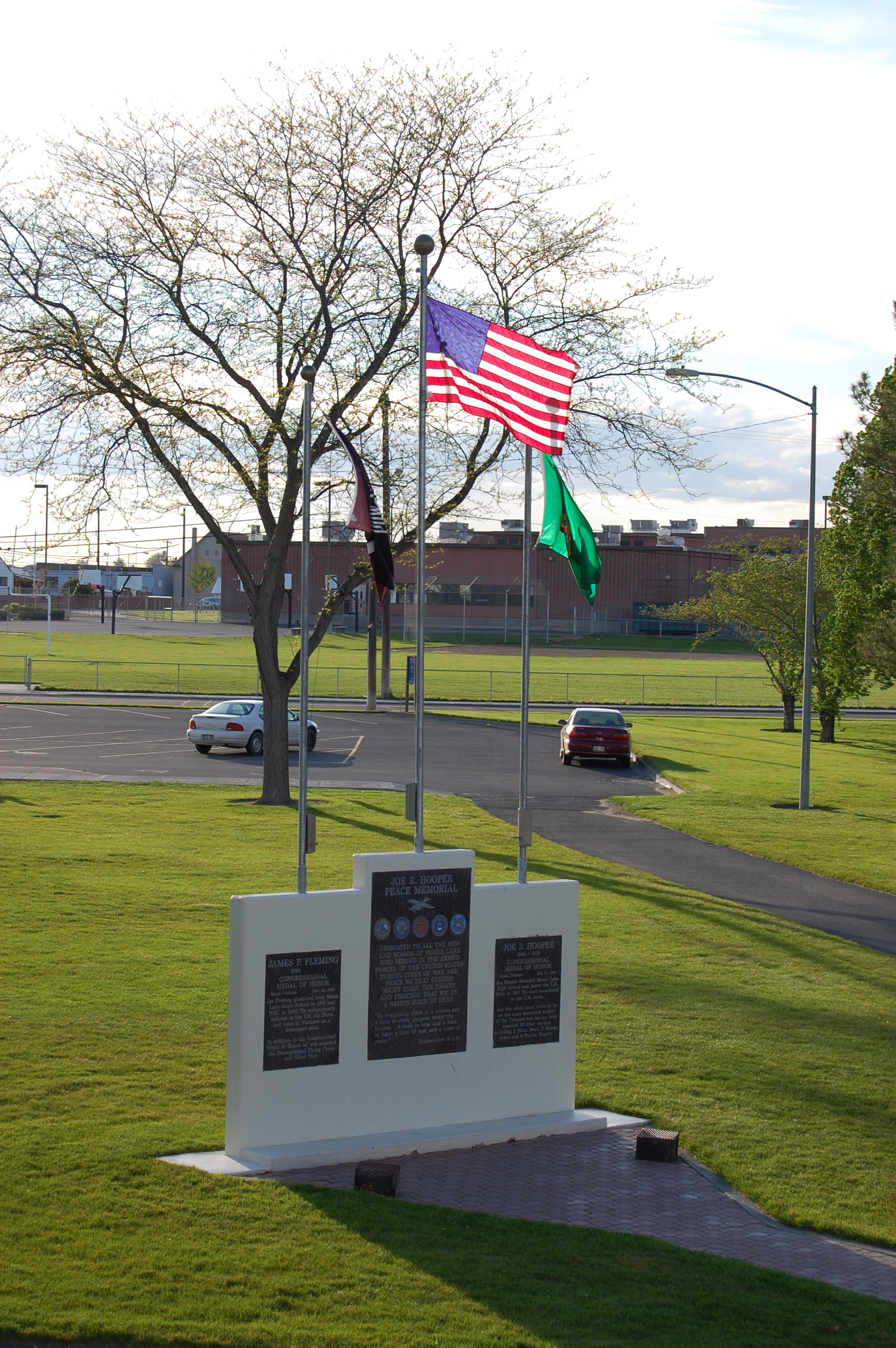
- Moses Lake War Memorial
Interactive Map of Moses Lake–Othello, WA CSA
City of Moses Lake
Moses Lake, WA μSA
City of Othello, WA
Othello, WA μSA
- Country: United States
- State: Washington
- Largest city: Moses Lake (22,082)
- Other cities: Ephrata (8,047); Othello (7,809); Quincy (7,365); Ritzville (1,665)

Area
  - Total: 4,604.5 sq mi (11,926 km^{2})
- Highest elevation: 2,900 ft (884 m)
- Lowest elevation: 400 ft (122 m)

Population
  - Total: 112,514
  - Density: 24.4/sq mi (9.4/km^{2})
- Time zone: UTC-8 (PST)
  - Summer (DST): UTC-7 (PDT)
- Area code: 509

Moses Lake-Othello, WA CSA is the United States Census Bureau's official name for the combined statistical area that includes the Moses Lake micropolitan area (Grant County) as well as the Othello micropolitan area (Adams County). The population was 112,514 as of 2015. The CSA is anchored by the cities of Moses Lake, and Othello. The CSA also contains the city of Ritzville—the county seat of Adams County.

== Demographics ==
Historical population
Census	Pop.	Note	%±
1910	19,618		—
1920	17,394		−11.3%
1930	13,385		−23.0%
1940	20,877		56.0%
1950	30,930		48.2%
1960	56,406		82.4%
1970	53,895		−4.5%
1980	61,789		14.6%
1990	68,361		10.6%
2000	91,126		33.3%
2010	107,848		18.4%
2015 (est.)	112,514		4.3%

== See also ==
- Washington census statistical areas
