= Pullman–Moscow combined statistical area =

Pullman–Moscow Metropolitan Area
- Combined Statistical Area
- Pullman–Moscow, WA–ID; Combined Statistical Area
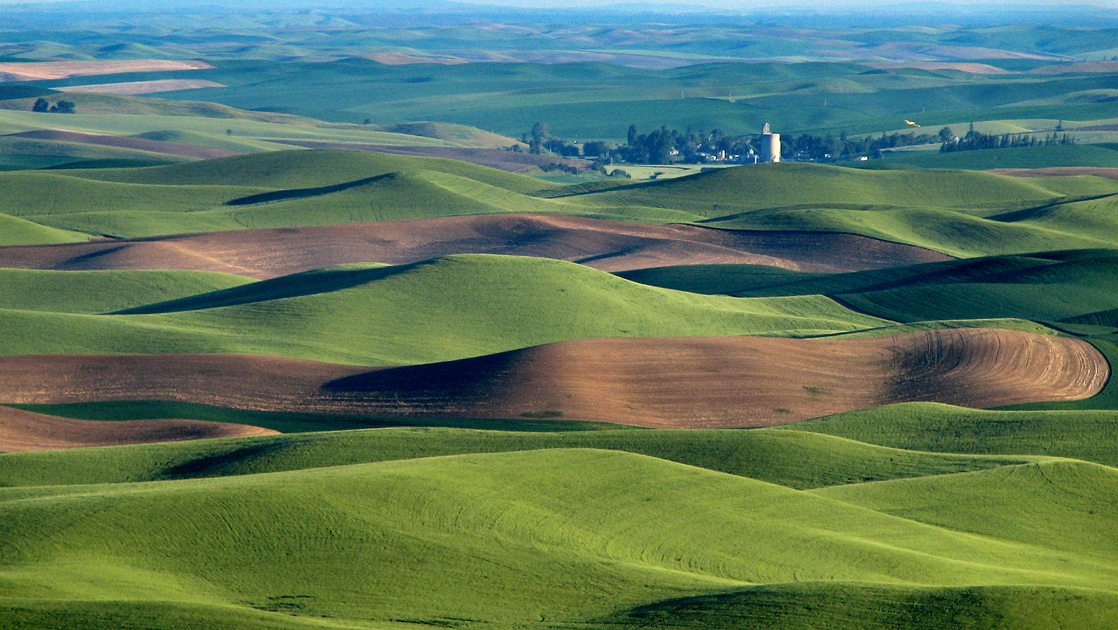
- The Palouse surrounding Pullman
Map of Pullman–Moscow, WA–ID CSA
City of Pullman, WA
City of Moscow, ID
Pullman, ID–WA μSA
Moscow, ID–WA μSA
- Country: United States
- States: Washington; Idaho
- Largest city: Pullman, WA (32,816)
- Other cities: Moscow, ID (25,730); Colfax, WA (2,870)

Area
  - Total: 3,235.1 sq mi (8,379 km^{2})
- Highest elevation: 5,320 ft (1,620 m)
- Lowest elevation: 590 ft (180 m)

Population
  - Total: 90,579
  - Density: 28/sq mi (10.8/km^{2})
- Time zone: UTC−8 (PST)
  - Summer (DST): UTC−7 (PDT)
- Area codes: 208/986, 509

Pullman–Moscow, WA–ID CSA is the United States Census Bureau's official name for the combined statistical area in the northwest United States that includes the Pullman micropolitan area (all of Whitman County, Washington) and the Moscow micropolitan area (all of Latah County, Idaho). The combined population of the two counties was 87,490 as of the 2020 census, increasing to an estimated 90,354 in 2025.

The states' land grant universities are both located here, less than eight miles (13 km) apart: Washington State University in Pullman and the University of Idaho in Moscow. Outside of these two cities, the two counties are predominantly rural and agricultural. The CSA is the center of the Palouse region, a former prairie characterized by its dune-like hills. The cities of Moscow and Pullman are roughly four miles apart, and are connected by Washington State Route 270, more commonly known as the Moscow-Pullman Highway.

== Demographics ==
Statistical Area	2025 Estimate	2020 Census	Change	Area	Density
Pullman, WA Micropolitan Statistical Area	48,512	47,973	+1.12%	2,178 sq mi (5,640 km^{2})	22/sq mi (9/km^{2})
Moscow, ID Micropolitan Statistical Area	41,842	39,517	+5.88%	1,077 sq mi (2,790 km^{2})	39/sq mi (15/km^{2})
Total	90,354	87,490	+3.27%	3,255 sq mi (8,430 km^{2})	28/sq mi (11/km^{2})

Historical population
Census	Pop.	Note	%±
1890	28,282		—
1900	38,811		37.2%
1910	52,090		34.2%
1920	49,415		−5.1%
1930	45,812		−7.3%
1940	46,025		0.5%
1950	53,440		16.1%
1960	52,433		−1.9%
1970	62,791		19.8%
1980	68,852		9.7%
1990	69,392		0.8%
2000	75,675		9.1%
2010	82,020		8.4%
2020	87,500		6.7%
2024 (est.)	90,579		3.5%

== See also ==
- Idaho census statistical areas
- Washington census statistical areas
