= Hailey micropolitan area =

Hailey Micropolitan Area
- Micropolitan Statistical Area
- Hailey, ID Micropolitan Statistical Area
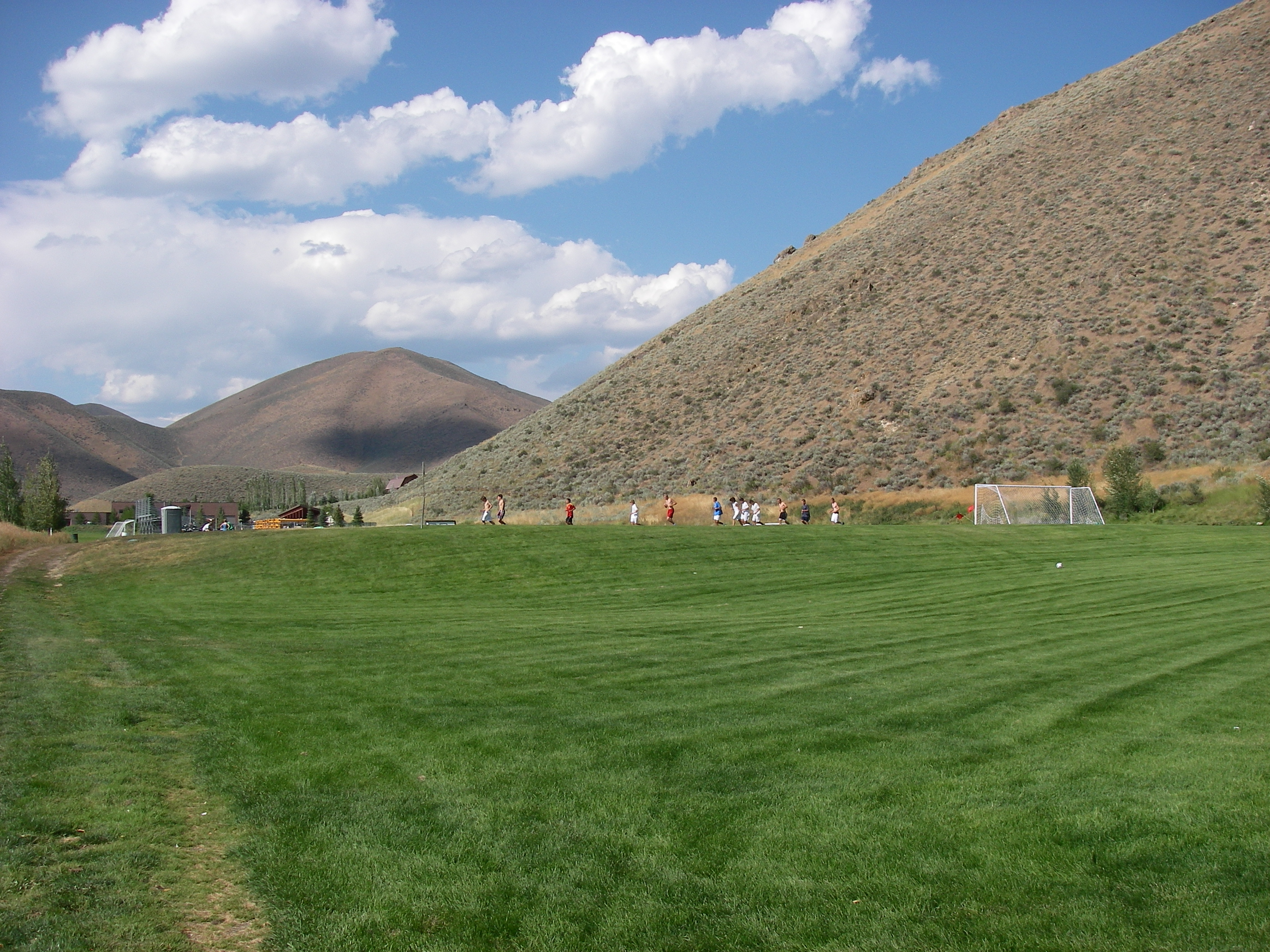
- Soccer fields in Hailey (2009)
Interactive Map of Hailey, ID μSA
City of Hailey
Hailey, ID μSA
- Country: United States
- State: Idaho
- Largest city: Hailey
- Time zone: UTC-7 (MST)
  - Summer (DST): UTC-6 (MDT)

The Hailey Micropolitan Statistical Area, as defined by the United States Census Bureau, is an area consisting of three counties in the state of Idaho. These counties are Blaine County, Camas County, and Lincoln County. The micropolitan area is anchored by the city of Hailey.
