= Micropolitan statistical area =

Statistical area of the United States

United States micropolitan statistical areas (μSA), as defined by the Office of Management and Budget (OMB), are labor market and statistical areas in the United States centered on an urban cluster (urban area) with a population of at least 10,000 but fewer than 50,000 people. The micropolitan area designation was created in 2003. Like the better-known metropolitan statistical areas, a micropolitan area is a geographic entity used for statistical purposes based on counties and county equivalents. On July 21, 2023, the Office of Management and Budget released revised delineations of the various core-based statistical areas (CBSAs) in the United States, which recognized 542 micropolitan areas in the United States, four of which are in Puerto Rico.

The term "micropolitan" gained currency in the 1990s to describe growing population centers in the United States that are removed from larger cities, in some cases by 100 miles (160 km) or more.

Micropolitan cities do not have the economic or political importance of large cities, but are nevertheless significant centers of population and production, drawing workers and shoppers from a wide local area. Because the designation is based on the core urban cluster's population and not on that of the whole area, some micropolitan areas are much larger than some metropolitan areas. For example, the Ottawa, IL Micropolitan Statistical Area had a 2010 census population of 154,908. That would put its total population ahead of roughly 100 individual locations classified as a metropolitan statistical area in 2010. The largest of the areas, around Claremont and Lebanon, New Hampshire, had a population in excess of 218,000 in 2010; Claremont's population was only 13,355 in the 2010 U.S. census, and Lebanon's population was only 13,151.

An enlargeable map of the 935 core-based statistical areas (CBSAs) of the United States and Puerto Rico as of 2023; the 542 μSAs are shown in light green.

== United States ==
The table lists the 538 μSAs of the incorporated United States (the 50 states and the District of Columbia) with the following information:

1. The μSA rank by population as of July 1, 2025, as estimated by the United States Census Bureau
2. The μSA name as designated by the United States Office of Management and Budget
3. The μSA population as of July 1, 2025, as estimated by the United States Census Bureau
4. The μSA population as of April 1, 2020, as enumerated by the 2020 United States census (Note: Populations retroactively adjusted to account for new μSA delineations as redefined in 2023. This number reflects what the 2020 Census would have shown the population to be had the current delineated boundaries been in effect at the time of the 2020 Census.)
5. The percent μSA population change from April 1, 2020, to July 1, 2025
6. The combined statistical area (CSA) if it is designated and the μSA is a component

The 538 micropolitan statistical areas of the United States
Micropolitan statistical area	2025 estimate	2020 census	Change	Encompassing combined statistical area
Seaford, DE μSA	277,140	237,378	+16.75%	
Lebanon–Claremont, NH-VT μSA	224,500	221,211	+1.49%	
Hilo–Kailua, HI μSA	210,043	200,629	+4.69%	
East Stroudsburg, PA μSA	167,179	168,327	−0.68%	Allentown–Bethlehem–East Stroudsburg, PA-NJ CSA
Concord, NH μSA	158,078	153,808	+2.78%	Boston–Worcester–Providence, MA-RI-NH CSA
Cookeville, TN μSA	152,477	141,333	+7.88%	
Anderson Creek, NC μSA	150,137	133,568	+12.40%	Raleigh–Durham–Cary, NC CSA
Corbin, KY μSA	150,040	149,863	+0.12%	Middlesborough–Corbin, KY CSA
Ottawa, IL μSA	145,902	148,539	−1.78%	Chicago–Naperville, IL-IN-WI CSA
Pottsville, PA μSA	145,085	143,049	+1.42%	
Tupelo, MS μSA	133,167	132,214	+0.72%	Tupelo–Corinth, MS CSA
Richmond–Berea, KY μSA	131,806	122,901	+7.25%	Lexington-Fayette–Richmond–Frankfort, KY CSA
Eureka–Arcata, CA μSA	131,647	136,463	−3.53%	
Augusta–Waterville, ME μSA	129,067	123,642	+4.39%	
New Bern, NC μSA	127,358	122,168	+4.25%	New Bern–Morehead City, NC CSA
Jamestown–Dunkirk, NY μSA	124,126	127,657	−2.77%	
Holland, MI μSA	123,188	120,502	+2.23%	Grand Rapids–Wyoming, MI CSA
Lumberton, NC μSA	119,941	116,530	+2.93%	Fayetteville–Lumberton–Pinehurst, NC CSA
Wooster, OH μSA	116,758	116,894	−0.12%	Cleveland–Akron–Canton, OH CSA
Kalispell, MT μSA	115,429	104,357	+10.61%	
Torrington, CT μSA	114,690	112,503	+1.94%	New Haven–Hartford–Waterbury, CT CSA
Roseburg, OR μSA	111,951	111,201	+0.67%	
Show Low, AZ μSA	109,946	106,717	+3.03%	
Hermitage, PA μSA	107,860	110,652	−2.52%	Pittsburgh–Weirton–Steubenville, PA-OH-WV CSA
Sunbury, PA μSA	107,788	109,783	−1.82%	Bloomsburg–Berwick–Sunbury, PA CSA
LaGrange, GA-AL μSA	107,097	104,198	+2.78%	Atlanta–Athens-Clarke County–Sandy Springs, GA-AL CSA
Whitewater–Elkhorn, WI μSA	106,127	106,478	−0.33%	Milwaukee–Racine–Waukesha, WI CSA
Moses Lake, WA μSA	105,727	99,123	+6.66%	Moses Lake–Othello, WA CSA
Massena–Ogdensburg, NY μSA	105,488	108,505	−2.78%	
Albertville, AL μSA	103,537	97,612	+6.07%	Huntsville–Decatur–Albertville, AL-TN CSA
Shelby–Kings Mountain, NC μSA	103,325	99,519	+3.82%	Charlotte–Concord, NC-SC CSA
Truckee–Grass Valley, CA μSA	101,911	102,241	−0.32%	Sacramento–Roseville, CA CSA
Sevierville, TN μSA	101,342	98,380	+3.01%	Knoxville–Morristown–Sevierville, TN CSA
Danville, VA μSA	101,137	103,091	−1.90%	
Brainerd, MN μSA	100,562	96,189	+4.55%	
Salem, OH μSA	99,377	101,877	−2.45%	Youngstown–Warren–Salem, OH CSA
Jefferson, GA μSA	99,265	75,907	+30.77%	Atlanta–Athens-Clarke County–Sandy Springs, GA-AL CSA
Putnam, CT μSA	98,096	95,348	+2.88%	New Haven–Hartford–Waterbury, CT CSA
Statesboro, GA μSA	97,977	91,873	+6.64%	Savannah–Hinesville–Statesboro, GA CSA
Adrian, MI μSA	97,779	99,423	−1.65%	Detroit–Warren–Ann Arbor, MI CSA
Bluefield, WV-VA μSA	96,138	100,093	−3.95%	
Greenwood, SC μSA	95,215	93,646	+1.68%	Greenville–Spartanburg–Anderson, SC CSA
Cullman, AL μSA	94,009	87,866	+6.99%	Birmingham–Cullman–Talladega, AL CSA
Hermiston–Pendleton, OR μSA	93,721	92,261	+1.58%	
Cumberland, MD-WV μSA	93,640	95,044	−1.48%	
New Philadelphia–Dover, OH μSA	92,373	93,263	−0.95%	Cleveland–Akron–Canton, OH CSA
Corning, NY μSA	91,855	93,584	−1.85%	Elmira–Corning, NY CSA
Talladega–Sylacauga, AL μSA	91,764	92,536	−0.83%	Birmingham–Cullman–Talladega, AL CSA
Pikeville, KY μSA	89,122	94,611	−5.80%	
Beaver Dam, WI μSA	89,097	89,396	−0.33%	Milwaukee–Racine–Waukesha, WI CSA
Athens, TX μSA	88,595	82,150	+7.85%	Dallas–Fort Worth, TX-OK CSA
Lufkin, TX μSA	88,154	86,395	+2.04%	
Clarksburg, WV μSA	88,142	90,434	−2.53%	Fairmont–Clarksburg, WV CSA
Ukiah, CA μSA	88,122	91,601	−3.80%	
Centralia, WA μSA	88,062	82,149	+7.20%	Seattle–Tacoma, WA CSA
Zanesville, OH μSA	87,014	86,410	+0.70%	Columbus–Marion–Zanesville, OH CSA
Watertown–Fort Atkinson, WI μSA	86,505	84,900	+1.89%	Milwaukee–Racine–Waukesha, WI CSA
Oak Harbor, WA μSA	85,657	86,857	−1.38%	Seattle–Tacoma, WA CSA
Meridian, MS μSA	85,419	88,599	−3.59%	
Russellville, AR μSA	84,932	83,644	+1.54%	
Stillwater, OK μSA	83,889	81,646	+2.75%	
Huntsville, TX μSA	83,842	76,400	+9.74%	Houston–Pasadena, TX CSA
Seneca, SC μSA	83,775	78,607	+6.57%	Greenville–Spartanburg–Anderson, SC CSA
Orangeburg, SC μSA	83,177	84,223	−1.24%	Columbia–Sumter–Orangeburg, SC CSA
Indiana, PA μSA	82,878	83,246	−0.44%	Pittsburgh–Weirton–Steubenville, PA-OH-WV CSA
Laurel, MS μSA	82,281	83,613	−1.59%	Hattiesburg–Laurel, MS CSA
Meadville, PA μSA	81,792	83,938	−2.56%	Erie–Meadville, PA CSA
Manitowoc, WI μSA	81,710	81,359	+0.43%	
Heber, UT μSA	81,655	77,145	+5.85%	Salt Lake City–Provo–Orem, UT CSA
Wilson, NC μSA	81,150	78,784	+3.00%	Rocky Mount–Wilson–Roanoke Rapids, NC CSA
Warsaw, IN μSA	80,892	80,240	+0.81%	South Bend–Elkhart–Mishawaka, IN-MI CSA
Opelousas, LA μSA	80,765	82,540	−2.15%	Lafayette–New Iberia–Opelousas, LA CSA
Monticello, NY μSA	80,586	78,624	+2.50%	New York–Newark, NY-NJ-CT-PA CSA
Key West–Key Largo, FL μSA	80,406	82,874	−2.98%	Miami–Port St. Lucie–Fort Lauderdale, FL CSA
Rifle, CO μSA	80,099	79,043	+1.34%	Edwards–Rifle, CO CSA
Searcy, AR μSA	80,085	76,822	+4.25%	Little Rock–North Little Rock, AR CSA
Keene, NH μSA	78,269	76,458	+2.37%	Keene–Brattleboro, NH-VT CSA
Port Angeles, WA μSA	78,202	77,155	+1.36%	
Aberdeen, WA μSA	78,144	75,636	+3.32%	
Plattsburgh, NY μSA	78,138	79,843	−2.14%	
DuBois, PA μSA	78,100	80,562	−3.06%	State College–DuBois, PA CSA
Frankfort, KY μSA	77,874	75,393	+3.29%	Lexington-Fayette–Richmond–Frankfort, KY CSA
Palatka, FL μSA	77,734	73,321	+6.02%	Jacksonville–Kingsland–Palatka, FL-GA CSA
Chillicothe, OH μSA	76,429	77,093	−0.86%	Columbus–Marion–Zanesville, OH CSA
Olean, NY μSA	75,390	77,042	−2.14%	Buffalo–Cheektowaga–Olean, NY CSA
Shawnee, OK μSA	75,102	72,454	+3.65%	Oklahoma City–Shawnee, OK CSA
Findlay, OH μSA	75,034	74,920	+0.15%	Findlay–Tiffin, OH CSA
Hobbs, NM μSA	74,749	74,455	+0.39%	
Auburn, NY μSA	74,365	76,248	−2.47%	Syracuse–Auburn, NY CSA
Quincy, IL-MO μSA	74,146	75,769	−2.14%	Quincy–Hannibal, IL-MO CSA
Lake City, FL μSA	74,094	69,698	+6.31%	Gainesville–Lake City, FL CSA
Fort Payne, AL μSA	74,085	71,608	+3.46%	Huntsville–Decatur–Albertville, AL-TN CSA
Wisconsin Rapids–Marshfield, WI μSA	74,060	74,207	−0.20%	Wausau–Stevens Point–Wisconsin Rapids, WI CSA
Greeneville, TN μSA	73,831	70,152	+5.24%	Johnson City–Kingsport–Bristol, TN-VA CSA
Kapaa, HI μSA	73,400	73,298	+0.14%	
Thomasville, GA μSA	72,958	72,034	+1.28%	
Mount Airy, NC μSA	72,287	71,359	+1.30%	Greensboro–Winston-Salem–High Point, NC CSA
Somerset, PA μSA	72,004	74,129	−2.87%	Johnstown–Somerset, PA CSA
Oxford, MS μSA	71,972	68,294	+5.39%	
Stevens Point–Plover, WI μSA	71,943	70,377	+2.23%	Wausau–Stevens Point–Wisconsin Rapids, WI CSA
Athens, TN μSA	71,590	66,034	+8.41%	Chattanooga–Cleveland–Dalton, TN-GA-AL CSA
Portsmouth, OH μSA	71,365	74,008	−3.57%	Charleston–Huntington–Ashland, WV-OH-KY CSA
Danville, IL μSA	71,259	74,188	−3.95%	Champaign–Urbana–Danville, IL CSA
Shelton, WA μSA	71,165	65,726	+8.28%	Seattle–Tacoma, WA CSA
Greenfield, MA μSA	70,698	71,029	−0.47%	Springfield–Amherst Town–Northampton, MA CSA
Granbury, TX μSA	70,501	61,598	+14.45%	Dallas–Fort Worth, TX-OK CSA
Morehead City, NC μSA	70,469	67,686	+4.11%	New Bern–Morehead City, NC CSA
Brigham City, UT-ID μSA	70,405	62,230	+13.14%	Salt Lake City–Provo–Orem, UT CSA
Alamogordo, NM μSA	70,368	67,839	+3.73%	
Klamath Falls, OR μSA	70,274	69,413	+1.24%	
Sanford, NC μSA	70,258	63,285	+11.02%	Raleigh–Durham–Cary, NC CSA
Pine Bluff, AR μSA	70,211	74,810	−6.15%	Little Rock–North Little Rock, AR CSA
Faribault–Northfield, MN μSA	69,939	67,097	+4.24%	Minneapolis–St. Paul, MN-WI CSA
Rexburg, ID μSA	69,380	66,301	+4.64%	Idaho Falls–Rexburg–Blackfoot, ID CSA
Tullahoma–Manchester, TN μSA	69,339	64,350	+7.75%	Nashville-Davidson–Murfreesboro, TN CSA
Albemarle, NC μSA	68,830	62,504	+10.12%	Charlotte–Concord, NC-SC CSA
Gallup, NM μSA	68,119	72,902	−6.56%	
Marquette, MI μSA	68,064	66,017	+3.10%	
Farmington, MO μSA	67,809	66,922	+1.33%	St. Louis–St. Charles–Farmington, MO-IL CSA
Clearlake, CA μSA	67,772	68,163	−0.57%	
Owosso, MI μSA	67,681	68,094	−0.61%	Lansing–East Lansing–Owosso, MI CSA
Somerset, KY μSA	67,384	65,034	+3.61%	
Marion–Herrin, IL μSA	67,225	67,153	+0.11%	Carbondale–Marion–Herrin, IL CSA
Columbus, MS μSA	67,144	69,164	−2.92%	Starkville–Columbus, MS CSA
Cedar City, UT μSA	67,141	57,289	+17.20%	
New Iberia, LA μSA	66,846	69,929	−4.41%	Lafayette–New Iberia–Opelousas, LA CSA
Muskogee, OK μSA	66,708	66,339	+0.56%	Tulsa–Bartlesville–Muskogee, OK CSA
Baraboo, WI μSA	66,652	65,763	+1.35%	Madison–Janesville–Beloit, WI CSA
Marion, IN μSA	66,524	66,674	−0.22%	
Rio Grande City–Roma, TX μSA	66,319	65,920	+0.61%	McAllen–Edinburg, TX CSA
Crossville, TN μSA	66,300	61,145	+8.43%	
North Wilkesboro, NC μSA	66,233	65,969	+0.40%	
Bloomsburg–Berwick, PA μSA	66,193	64,727	+2.26%	Bloomsburg–Berwick–Sunbury, PA CSA
Richmond, IN μSA	66,169	66,553	−0.58%	Richmond–Connersville, IN CSA
Nacogdoches, TX μSA	66,035	64,653	+2.14%	
Murrells Inlet, SC μSA	65,912	63,404	+3.96%	Myrtle Beach–Conway, SC CSA
Forest City, NC μSA	65,745	64,444	+2.02%	
Marinette, WI-MI μSA	65,515	65,374	+0.22%	Marinette–Iron Mountain, WI-MI CSA
Clovis, NM μSA	65,270	67,621	−3.48%	
Laconia, NH μSA	65,147	63,705	+2.26%	Boston–Worcester–Providence, MA-RI-NH CSA
Marion, OH μSA	65,115	65,359	−0.37%	Columbus–Marion–Zanesville, OH CSA
Mount Pleasant, MI μSA	64,691	64,394	+0.46%	Mount Pleasant–Alma, MI CSA
Red Bluff, CA μSA	64,665	65,829	−1.77%	Redding–Red Bluff, CA CSA
Mount Vernon, OH μSA	64,002	62,721	+2.04%	Columbus–Marion–Zanesville, OH CSA
Coos Bay–North Bend, OR μSA	63,992	64,929	−1.44%	
Waynesville, NC μSA	63,369	62,089	+2.06%	Asheville–Waynesville–Brevard, NC CSA
Roswell, NM μSA	63,364	65,157	−2.75%	
Paris, TX μSA	63,319	61,675	+2.67%	
Athens, OH μSA	63,197	62,431	+1.23%	Columbus–Marion–Zanesville, OH CSA
Martinsville, VA μSA	63,091	64,433	−2.08%	
Roanoke Rapids, NC μSA	63,025	66,093	−4.64%	Rocky Mount–Wilson–Roanoke Rapids, NC CSA
Hemlock Farms, PA μSA	62,808	58,535	+7.30%	New York–Newark, NY-NJ-CT-PA CSA
Carlsbad–Artesia, NM μSA	62,509	62,314	+0.31%	
Starkville, MS μSA	62,063	61,714	+0.57%	Starkville–Columbus, MS CSA
Calhoun, GA μSA	61,701	57,544	+7.22%	Atlanta–Athens-Clarke County–Sandy Springs, GA-AL CSA
Clewiston, FL μSA	61,546	51,745	+18.94%	Cape Coral–Fort Myers–Naples, FL CSA
Hutchinson, KS μSA	61,539	61,898	−0.58%	
Fergus Falls, MN μSA	61,041	60,081	+1.60%	
Sturgis, MI μSA	60,968	60,939	+0.05%	Kalamazoo–Battle Creek–Portage, MI CSA
Oneonta, NY μSA	60,589	58,524	+3.53%	
Dublin, GA μSA	60,351	58,759	+2.71%	
Hudson, NY μSA	60,168	61,570	−2.28%	Albany–Schenectady, NY CSA
Kingsland, GA μSA	60,143	54,768	+9.81%	Jacksonville–Kingsland–Palatka, FL-GA CSA
Ontario, OR-ID μSA	60,085	56,957	+5.49%	Boise City–Mountain Home–Ontario, ID-OR CSA
Palestine, TX μSA	59,805	57,922	+3.25%	
Rutland, VT μSA	59,653	60,572	−1.52%	
Barre, VT μSA	59,652	59,807	−0.26%	Burlington–South Burlington–Barre, VT CSA
Sayre, PA μSA	59,600	59,967	−0.61%	
Picayune, MS μSA	59,363	56,145	+5.73%	New Orleans–Metairie–Slidell, LA-MS CSA
Salina, KS μSA	59,121	60,038	−1.53%	
Fremont, OH μSA	58,655	58,896	−0.41%	Cleveland–Akron–Canton, OH CSA
Batavia, NY μSA	58,416	58,388	+0.05%	Rochester–Batavia–Seneca Falls, NY CSA
Marietta, OH μSA	58,389	59,771	−2.31%	Parkersburg–Marietta–Vienna, WV-OH CSA
Gaffney, SC μSA	58,275	56,216	+3.66%	Greenville–Spartanburg–Anderson, SC CSA
Norwalk, OH μSA	58,250	58,565	−0.54%	Cleveland–Akron–Canton, OH CSA
Kearney, NE μSA	57,962	56,772	+2.10%	
Waycross, GA μSA	57,670	55,967	+3.04%	
Pahrump, NV μSA	57,336	51,591	+11.14%	Las Vegas–Henderson, NV CSA
Henderson, KY μSA	57,184	57,810	−1.08%	Evansville–Henderson, IN-KY CSA
Corsicana, TX μSA	57,181	52,624	+8.66%	Dallas–Fort Worth, TX-OK CSA
Mount Pleasant, TX μSA	57,076	55,684	+2.50%	
Branson, MO μSA	57,001	56,066	+1.67%	
Danville, KY μSA	56,985	54,889	+3.82%	
Enterprise, AL μSA	56,953	53,465	+6.52%	Dothan–Enterprise–Ozark, AL CSA
Durango, CO μSA	56,898	55,638	+2.26%	
Elko, NV μSA	56,682	55,557	+2.02%	
Warrensburg, MO μSA	56,670	54,013	+4.92%	Kansas City–Overland Park–Kansas City, MO-KS CSA
Glasgow, KY μSA	56,224	54,771	+2.65%	Bowling Green–Glasgow–Franklin, KY CSA
Kinston, NC μSA	55,837	55,122	+1.30%	
Fairmont, WV μSA	55,584	56,205	−1.10%	Fairmont–Clarksburg, WV CSA
Shelbyville, TN μSA	55,273	50,237	+10.02%	Nashville-Davidson–Murfreesboro, TN CSA
Boone, NC μSA	54,786	54,086	+1.29%	
Natchez, MS-LA μSA	54,722	55,485	−1.38%	
Tiffin, OH μSA	54,522	55,069	−0.99%	Findlay–Tiffin, OH CSA
Ocean Pines, MD μSA	54,459	52,460	+3.81%	Salisbury–Ocean Pines, MD CSA
Fort Leonard Wood, MO μSA	54,442	53,955	+0.90%	
Sandpoint, ID μSA	54,420	47,110	+15.52%	
Edwards, CO μSA	54,291	55,731	−2.58%	Edwards–Rifle, CO CSA
Scottsboro, AL μSA	54,281	52,579	+3.24%	Chattanooga–Cleveland–Dalton, TN-GA-AL CSA
Sterling, IL μSA	54,121	55,691	−2.82%	Dixon–Sterling, IL CSA
Bartlesville, OK μSA	54,037	52,455	+3.02%	Tulsa–Bartlesville–Muskogee, OK CSA
Kerrville, TX μSA	54,037	52,598	+2.74%	San Antonio–New Braunfels–Kerrville, TX CSA
Payson, AZ μSA	53,801	53,272	+0.99%	Phoenix–Mesa, AZ CSA
Jacksonville, TX μSA	53,337	50,412	+5.80%	Tyler–Jacksonville, TX CSA
Sonora, CA μSA	53,160	55,620	−4.42%	
Douglas, GA μSA	52,861	51,378	+2.89%	
McComb, MS μSA	52,640	54,208	−2.89%	
Ashland, OH μSA	52,523	52,447	+0.14%	Mansfield–Ashland–Bucyrus, OH CSA
Carbondale, IL μSA	52,501	52,974	−0.89%	Carbondale–Marion–Herrin, IL CSA
Platteville, WI μSA	52,446	51,938	+0.98%	
Gloversville, NY μSA	52,216	53,324	−2.08%	Albany–Schenectady, NY CSA
Greenville, OH μSA	51,520	51,881	−0.70%	Dayton–Springfield–Kettering, OH CSA
Rochelle, IL μSA	51,399	51,788	−0.75%	Rockford–Freeport–Rochelle, IL CSA
Durant, OK μSA	51,367	46,067	+11.50%	Dallas–Fort Worth, TX-OK CSA
Tifton, GA μSA	51,237	50,350	+1.76%	
Gardnerville Ranchos, NV-CA μSA	51,154	50,692	+0.91%	Reno–Carson City–Gardnerville Ranchos, NV-CA CSA
Blackfoot, ID μSA	51,153	47,992	+6.59%	Idaho Falls–Rexburg–Blackfoot, ID CSA
Newport, OR μSA	50,636	50,395	+0.48%	
Winona, MN μSA	50,523	49,671	+1.72%	Rochester–Austin–Winona, MN CSA
Cornelia, GA μSA	50,416	46,031	+9.53%	Atlanta–Athens-Clarke County–Sandy Springs, GA-AL CSA
Amsterdam, NY μSA	50,046	49,532	+1.04%	Albany–Schenectady, NY CSA
Cañon City, CO μSA	50,039	48,939	+2.25%	Pueblo–Cañon City, CO CSA
Nogales, AZ μSA	50,020	47,669	+4.93%	Tucson–Nogales, AZ CSA
Sikeston, MO μSA	49,978	50,636	−1.30%	Cape Girardeau–Sikeston, MO-IL CSA
Ozark, AL μSA	49,912	49,326	+1.19%	Dothan–Enterprise–Ozark, AL CSA
Cadillac, MI μSA	49,719	48,725	+2.04%	
Mason City, IA μSA	49,710	50,570	−1.70%	
Oil City, PA μSA	49,346	50,454	−2.20%	
Burley, ID μSA	49,308	46,268	+6.57%	
Norfolk, NE μSA	49,228	48,744	+0.99%	
Tahlequah, OK μSA	49,196	47,078	+4.50%	
New Castle, IN μSA	49,137	48,914	+0.46%	Indianapolis–Carmel–Muncie, IN CSA
Ardmore, OK μSA	48,910	48,003	+1.89%	
Ellensburg, WA μSA	48,803	44,337	+10.07%	
Pullman, WA μSA	48,512	47,973	+1.12%	Pullman–Moscow, WA-ID CSA
Mount Sterling, KY μSA	48,428	46,977	+3.09%	Lexington-Fayette–Richmond–Frankfort, KY CSA
Ruston, LA μSA	48,360	48,396	−0.07%	Monroe–Ruston, LA CSA
Red Wing, MN μSA	48,195	47,582	+1.29%	Minneapolis–St. Paul, MN-WI CSA
Gillette, WY μSA	48,145	47,026	+2.38%	
Sidney, OH μSA	48,065	48,230	−0.34%	Dayton–Springfield–Kettering, OH CSA
Kendallville, IN μSA	47,937	47,457	+1.01%	Fort Wayne–Huntington–Auburn, IN CSA
Del Rio, TX μSA	47,835	47,586	+0.52%	
Galesburg, IL μSA	47,767	49,967	−4.40%	
Moultrie, GA μSA	47,438	45,898	+3.36%	
Paragould, AR μSA	47,411	45,736	+3.66%	Jonesboro–Paragould, AR CSA
Seymour, IN μSA	47,370	46,428	+2.03%	Indianapolis–Carmel–Muncie, IN CSA
Bemidji, MN μSA	47,055	46,228	+1.79%	
Lawrenceburg, TN μSA	46,914	44,159	+6.24%	Nashville-Davidson–Murfreesboro, TN CSA
Charleston–Mattoon, IL μSA	46,607	46,863	−0.55%	
Plymouth, IN μSA	46,599	46,095	+1.09%	South Bend–Elkhart–Mishawaka, IN-MI CSA
Columbus, NE μSA	46,583	44,878	+3.80%	
Sparta, WI μSA	46,572	46,274	+0.64%	La Crosse–Onalaska–Sparta, WI-MN CSA
Morgan City, LA μSA	46,552	49,406	−5.78%	
Rice Lake, WI μSA	46,484	46,711	−0.49%	
Bellefontaine, OH μSA	46,302	46,150	+0.33%	Columbus–Marion–Zanesville, OH CSA
Menomonie, WI μSA	46,223	45,440	+1.72%	Eau Claire–Menomonie, WI CSA
Lewistown, PA μSA	46,127	46,143	−0.03%	
Clinton, IA μSA	46,002	46,460	−0.99%	Davenport–Moline, IA-IL CSA
Coldwater, MI μSA	45,993	44,862	+2.52%	
Wapakoneta, OH μSA	45,909	46,422	−1.11%	Lima–Van Wert–Celina, OH CSA
Cortland, NY μSA	45,850	46,809	−2.05%	Ithaca–Cortland, NY CSA
Shawano, WI μSA	45,759	45,136	+1.38%	Green Bay–Shawano, WI CSA
Hillsdale, MI μSA	45,738	45,746	−0.02%	
Harrison, AR μSA	45,654	44,598	+2.37%	
Winchester, TN μSA	45,579	42,774	+6.56%	Nashville-Davidson–Murfreesboro, TN CSA
Bedford, IN μSA	45,568	45,011	+1.24%	Bloomington–Bedford, IN CSA
Cedartown, GA μSA	45,514	42,853	+6.21%	Atlanta–Athens-Clarke County–Sandy Springs, GA-AL CSA
Grand Rapids, MN μSA	45,404	45,014	+0.87%	Duluth–Grand Rapids, MN-WI CSA
Alice, TX μSA	45,383	45,967	−1.27%	Corpus Christi–Kingsville–Alice, TX CSA
Rolla, MO μSA	45,247	44,638	+1.36%	
Brattleboro, VT μSA	45,204	45,905	−1.53%	Keene–Brattleboro, NH-VT CSA
Marion, NC μSA	45,198	44,578	+1.39%	Charlotte–Concord, NC-SC CSA
Madisonville, KY μSA	45,127	45,423	−0.65%	
Bogalusa, LA μSA	44,937	45,463	−1.16%	New Orleans–Metairie–Slidell, LA-MS CSA
Effingham, IL μSA	44,727	45,118	−0.87%	
Willmar, MN μSA	44,720	43,732	+2.26%	
Washington, NC μSA	44,670	44,652	+0.04%	Greenville–Washington, NC CSA
Montrose, CO μSA	44,591	42,679	+4.48%	
Auburn, IN μSA	44,535	43,265	+2.94%	Fort Wayne–Huntington–Auburn, IN CSA
Gainesville, TX μSA	44,461	41,668	+6.70%	Dallas–Fort Worth, TX-OK CSA
Duncan, OK μSA	44,310	42,848	+3.41%	Lawton–Duncan, OK CSA
Sedalia, MO μSA	44,254	42,980	+2.96%	
Burlington, IA-IL μSA	44,061	45,297	−2.73%	Burlington–Fort Madison, IA-IL CSA
Milledgeville, GA μSA	44,029	43,799	+0.53%	
Jasper, IN μSA	44,016	43,637	+0.87%	
Stephenville, TX μSA	43,911	42,545	+3.21%	
McMinnville, TN μSA	43,717	40,953	+6.75%	
Ponca City, OK μSA	43,490	43,700	−0.48%	
McAlester, OK μSA	43,320	43,773	−1.03%	
Freeport, IL μSA	43,220	44,630	−3.16%	Rockford–Freeport–Rochelle, IL CSA
Huntingdon, PA μSA	43,001	44,092	−2.47%	Altoona–Huntingdon, PA CSA
Mountain Home, AR μSA	42,982	41,627	+3.26%	
Celina, OH μSA	42,737	42,528	+0.49%	Lima–Van Wert–Celina, OH CSA
Henderson, NC μSA	42,638	42,578	+0.14%	Raleigh–Durham–Cary, NC CSA
Okeechobee, FL μSA	42,608	39,644	+7.48%	Miami–Port St. Lucie–Fort Lauderdale, FL CSA
Big Rapids, MI μSA	42,320	39,714	+6.56%	Grand Rapids–Wyoming, MI CSA
Lewisburg, PA μSA	42,313	42,681	−0.86%	Bloomsburg–Berwick–Sunbury, PA CSA
Wilmington, OH μSA	42,301	42,018	+0.67%	Cincinnati–Wilmington, OH-KY-IN CSA
Elizabeth City, NC μSA	42,201	40,568	+4.03%	Virginia Beach–Norfolk, VA-NC CSA
El Campo, TX μSA	42,060	41,570	+1.18%	Houston–Pasadena, TX CSA
Rockingham, NC μSA	42,041	42,946	−2.11%	Fayetteville–Lumberton–Pinehurst, NC CSA
Poplar Bluff, MO μSA	41,904	42,130	−0.54%	
Bucyrus, OH μSA	41,896	42,025	−0.31%	Mansfield–Ashland–Bucyrus, OH CSA
Muscatine, IA μSA	41,853	43,235	−3.20%	Davenport–Moline, IA-IL CSA
Moscow, ID μSA	41,842	39,517	+5.88%	Pullman–Moscow, WA-ID CSA
Williston, ND μSA	41,767	40,950	+2.00%	
Vicksburg, MS μSA	41,759	44,722	−6.63%	Jackson–Vicksburg–Brookhaven, MS CSA
Aberdeen, SD μSA	41,583	42,287	−1.66%	
Rock Springs, WY μSA	41,267	42,272	−2.38%	
Alma, MI μSA	41,190	41,761	−1.37%	Mount Pleasant–Alma, MI CSA
Austin, MN μSA	40,971	40,029	+2.35%	Rochester–Austin–Winona, MN CSA
Alexander City, AL μSA	40,953	41,311	−0.87%	Columbus–Auburn–Opelika, GA-AL CSA
Astoria, OR μSA	40,926	41,072	−0.36%	
West Plains, MO μSA	40,798	39,750	+2.64%	
Hastings, NE μSA	40,577	40,704	−0.31%	
Greenville, MS μSA	40,446	44,922	−9.96%	
Safford, AZ μSA	40,157	38,533	+4.21%	
Alexandria, MN μSA	40,120	39,006	+2.86%	
Lake of the Woods, VA μSA	40,083	36,254	+10.56%	Washington–Baltimore–Arlington, DC-MD-VA-WV-PA CSA
Houghton, MI μSA	40,028	39,407	+1.58%	
Marshalltown, IA μSA	39,890	40,105	−0.54%	
Española, NM μSA	39,832	40,363	−1.32%	Albuquerque–Santa Fe–Los Alamos, NM CSA
Selinsgrove, PA μSA	39,655	39,736	−0.20%	Bloomsburg–Berwick–Sunbury, PA CSA
Newberry, SC μSA	39,561	37,719	+4.88%	Columbia–Sumter–Orangeburg, SC CSA
Riverton, WY μSA	39,464	39,234	+0.59%	
Murray, KY μSA	39,421	37,103	+6.25%	
Bonham, TX μSA	39,265	35,662	+10.10%	Dallas–Fort Worth, TX-OK CSA
Dickinson, ND μSA	39,142	38,686	+1.18%	
Breckenridge, CO μSA	39,069	38,491	+1.50%	
Sulphur Springs, TX μSA	39,063	36,787	+6.19%	Dallas–Fort Worth, TX-OK CSA
Weatherford, OK μSA	39,059	39,437	−0.96%	Weatherford–Elk City, OK CSA
Pittsburg, KS μSA	39,008	38,972	+0.09%	
Bradford, PA μSA	38,984	40,432	−3.58%	
Hannibal, MO μSA	38,969	38,880	+0.23%	Quincy–Hannibal, IL-MO CSA
Crawfordsville, IN μSA	38,954	37,936	+2.68%	Indianapolis–Carmel–Muncie, IN CSA
Urbana, OH μSA	38,820	38,714	+0.27%	Dayton–Springfield–Kettering, OH CSA
Batesville, AR μSA	38,785	37,938	+2.23%	
Brownwood, TX μSA	38,711	38,095	+1.62%	
Laramie, WY μSA	38,558	37,066	+4.03%	
Ada, OK μSA	38,528	38,065	+1.22%	
Steamboat Springs, CO μSA	38,451	38,121	+0.87%	
Campbellsville, KY μSA	38,407	37,130	+3.44%	
Cambridge, OH μSA	38,379	38,438	−0.15%	Columbus–Marion–Zanesville, OH CSA
Defiance, OH μSA	38,292	38,286	+0.02%	
Brenham, TX μSA	38,288	35,805	+6.93%	Houston–Pasadena, TX CSA
Vernal, UT μSA	38,278	35,620	+7.46%	
Kill Devil Hills, NC μSA	38,245	36,915	+3.60%	Virginia Beach–Norfolk, VA-NC CSA
Easton, MD μSA	38,238	37,526	+1.90%	Washington–Baltimore–Arlington, DC-MD-VA-WV-PA CSA
Lewisburg, TN μSA	38,071	34,318	+10.94%	Nashville-Davidson–Murfreesboro, TN CSA
Fremont, NE μSA	38,057	37,167	+2.39%	Omaha–Fremont, NE-IA CSA
Newport, TN μSA	37,889	35,999	+5.25%	Knoxville–Morristown–Sevierville, TN CSA
Greencastle, IN μSA	37,876	36,726	+3.13%	Indianapolis–Carmel–Muncie, IN CSA
Lock Haven, PA μSA	37,870	37,450	+1.12%	Williamsport–Lock Haven, PA CSA
Logansport, IN μSA	37,836	37,870	−0.09%	
Blytheville, AR μSA	37,828	40,685	−7.02%	
Brookings, SD μSA	37,635	34,375	+9.48%	
Garden City, KS μSA	37,505	38,470	−2.51%	
Owatonna, MN μSA	37,464	37,406	+0.16%	Minneapolis–St. Paul, MN-WI CSA
Jacksonville, IL μSA	37,381	37,864	−1.28%	Springfield–Jacksonville–Lincoln, IL CSA
Huntington, IN μSA	37,224	36,662	+1.53%	Fort Wayne–Huntington–Auburn, IN CSA
Coshocton, OH μSA	37,188	36,612	+1.57%	Cleveland–Akron–Canton, OH CSA
Arcadia, FL μSA	37,078	33,976	+9.13%	North Port–Bradenton, FL CSA
Mayfield, KY μSA	37,050	36,649	+1.09%	Paducah–Mayfield, KY-IL CSA
Warren, PA μSA	37,038	38,587	−4.01%	
Lebanon, MO μSA	36,943	36,039	+2.51%	
El Dorado, AR μSA	36,926	39,054	−5.45%	
Fayetteville, TN μSA	36,853	35,319	+4.34%	Huntsville–Decatur–Albertville, AL-TN CSA
Fort Dodge, IA μSA	36,838	36,999	−0.44%	
Plainview, TX μSA	36,700	37,924	−3.23%	Lubbock–Plainview, TX CSA
DeRidder, LA μSA	36,673	36,549	+0.34%	Lake Charles–DeRidder, LA CSA
Decatur, IN μSA	36,650	35,809	+2.35%	Fort Wayne–Huntington–Auburn, IN CSA
Hutchinson, MN μSA	36,631	36,771	−0.38%	Minneapolis–St. Paul, MN-WI CSA
Bennington, VT μSA	36,630	37,347	−1.92%	
Jackson, WY-ID μSA	36,587	34,961	+4.65%	
Escanaba, MI μSA	36,582	36,903	−0.87%	
Bay City, TX μSA	36,463	36,255	+0.57%	Houston–Pasadena, TX CSA
Centralia, IL μSA	36,382	37,729	−3.57%	St. Louis–St. Charles–Farmington, MO-IL CSA
Dyersburg, TN μSA	36,320	36,801	−1.31%	
Scottsbluff, NE μSA	36,272	36,758	−1.32%	
Vidalia, GA μSA	36,180	35,640	+1.52%	
Mount Vernon, IL μSA	36,147	37,113	−2.60%	
Butte-Silver Bow, MT μSA	36,118	35,133	+2.80%	
Natchitoches, LA μSA	36,089	37,515	−3.80%	
Sault Ste. Marie, MI μSA	36,081	36,785	−1.91%	
Vincennes, IN μSA	35,652	36,282	−1.74%	
Detroit Lakes, MN μSA	35,497	35,183	+0.89%	
Ottumwa, IA μSA	35,210	35,437	−0.64%	
Selma, AL μSA	35,140	38,462	−8.64%	Montgomery–Selma, AL CSA
Pontiac, IL μSA	35,057	35,815	−2.12%	Bloomington–Pontiac, IL CSA
Brookhaven, MS μSA	35,012	34,907	+0.30%	Jackson–Vicksburg–Brookhaven, MS CSA
Minden, LA μSA	34,948	36,967	−5.46%	Shreveport–Bossier City–Minden, LA CSA
Greenwood, MS μSA	34,912	38,337	−8.93%	
Emporia, KS μSA	34,838	34,751	+0.25%	
Angola, IN μSA	34,799	34,435	+1.06%	Fort Wayne–Huntington–Auburn, IN CSA
Corinth, MS μSA	34,569	34,740	−0.49%	Tupelo–Corinth, MS CSA
Taos, NM μSA	34,564	34,489	+0.22%	
Peru, IN μSA	34,487	35,962	−4.10%	Indianapolis–Carmel–Muncie, IN CSA
Arkansas City–Winfield, KS μSA	34,382	34,549	−0.48%	Wichita–Arkansas City–Winfield, KS CSA
Brevard, NC μSA	34,211	32,986	+3.71%	Asheville–Waynesville–Brevard, NC CSA
Washington, IN μSA	34,209	33,381	+2.48%	
Pella, IA μSA	34,192	33,414	+2.33%	Des Moines–West Des Moines–Ames, IA CSA
Dodge City, KS μSA	33,993	34,287	−0.86%	
North Platte, NE μSA	33,972	35,392	−4.01%	
Port Townsend, WA μSA	33,970	32,977	+3.01%	
Petoskey, MI μSA	33,775	34,112	−0.99%	
Troy, AL μSA	33,688	33,009	+2.06%	
Cambridge, MD μSA	33,628	32,531	+3.37%	Washington–Baltimore–Arlington, DC-MD-VA-WV-PA CSA
Malvern, AR μSA	33,451	33,040	+1.24%	Hot Springs–Malvern, AR CSA
Taylorville, IL μSA	33,443	34,032	−1.73%	Springfield–Jacksonville–Lincoln, IL CSA
Americus, GA μSA	33,394	34,163	−2.25%	
Frankfort, IN μSA	33,322	33,190	+0.40%	Lafayette–West Lafayette–Frankfort, IN CSA
Laurinburg, NC μSA	33,322	34,174	−2.49%	Fayetteville–Lumberton–Pinehurst, NC CSA
Madison, IN μSA	33,279	33,147	+0.40%	
Martin, TN μSA	33,261	32,902	+1.09%	Union City–Martin, TN CSA
Sheridan, WY μSA	33,241	30,921	+7.50%	
Dixon, IL μSA	32,914	34,145	−3.61%	Dixon–Sterling, IL CSA
Canton, IL μSA	32,901	33,609	−2.11%	Peoria–Canton, IL CSA
Paris, TN μSA	32,896	32,199	+2.16%	
Seneca Falls, NY μSA	32,883	33,814	−2.75%	Rochester–Batavia–Seneca Falls, NY CSA
Beeville, TX μSA	32,515	31,047	+4.73%	
Jesup, GA μSA	32,481	30,144	+7.75%	Savannah–Hinesville–Statesboro, GA CSA
Russellville, AL μSA	32,449	32,113	+1.05%	Florence–Muscle Shoals–Russellville, AL CSA
Hailey, ID μSA	32,436	30,476	+6.43%	
Fort Madison, IA μSA	32,306	33,555	−3.72%	Burlington–Fort Madison, IA-IL CSA
Juneau, AK μSA	31,609	32,255	−2.00%	
Cody, WY μSA	31,171	29,624	+5.22%	
Mineral Wells, TX μSA	30,791	28,409	+8.38%	Dallas–Fort Worth, TX-OK CSA
Wabash, IN μSA	30,713	30,976	−0.85%	
Iron Mountain, MI-WI μSA	30,575	30,505	+0.23%	Marinette–Iron Mountain, WI-MI CSA
Big Spring, TX μSA	30,504	34,860	−12.50%	
Albert Lea, MN μSA	30,440	30,895	−1.47%	
Miami, OK μSA	30,438	30,285	+0.51%	Joplin–Miami, MO-OK-KS CSA
Kingsville, TX μSA	30,315	31,040	−2.34%	Corpus Christi–Kingsville–Alice, TX CSA
Las Vegas, NM μSA	30,311	31,390	−3.44%	Albuquerque–Santa Fe–Los Alamos, NM CSA
Fort Morgan, CO μSA	30,306	29,111	+4.10%	
Grenada, MS μSA	30,222	31,451	−3.91%	
Union City, TN μSA	30,067	30,787	−2.34%	Union City–Martin, TN CSA
McPherson, KS μSA	30,064	30,223	−0.53%	
St. Marys, PA μSA	29,926	30,990	−3.43%	
Kirksville, MO μSA	29,824	29,346	+1.63%	
Watertown, SD μSA	29,562	28,325	+4.37%	
Mountain Home, ID μSA	29,465	28,666	+2.79%	Boise City–Mountain Home–Ontario, ID-OR CSA
Spearfish, SD μSA	29,459	25,768	+14.32%	Rapid City–Spearfish, SD CSA
Bainbridge, GA μSA	29,432	29,367	+0.22%	Tallahassee–Bainbridge, FL-GA CSA
Hays, KS μSA	29,075	28,934	+0.49%	
Gallipolis, OH μSA	29,072	29,220	−0.51%	
Ludington, MI μSA	29,040	29,052	−0.04%	
Van Wert, OH μSA	29,013	28,931	+0.28%	Lima–Van Wert–Celina, OH CSA
Alpena, MI μSA	28,853	28,907	−0.19%	
Washington Court House, OH μSA	28,552	28,951	−1.38%	Columbus–Marion–Zanesville, OH CSA
Fredericksburg, TX μSA	28,527	26,725	+6.74%	San Antonio–New Braunfels–Kerrville, TX CSA
Thomaston, GA μSA	28,500	27,700	+2.89%	Atlanta–Athens-Clarke County–Sandy Springs, GA-AL CSA
Cleveland, MS μSA	28,262	30,985	−8.79%	
Susanville, CA μSA	28,117	32,730	−14.09%	
Alamosa, CO μSA	27,896	27,336	+2.05%	
Toccoa, GA μSA	27,854	26,784	+3.99%	
Silver City, NM μSA	27,252	28,185	−3.31%	
Lincoln, IL μSA	27,182	27,987	−2.88%	Springfield–Jacksonville–Lincoln, IL CSA
Elkins, WV μSA	26,882	27,932	−3.76%	
Eufaula, AL-GA μSA	26,861	27,458	−2.17%	
Kennett, MO μSA	26,855	28,283	−5.05%	
Greensburg, IN μSA	26,576	26,472	+0.39%	Indianapolis–Carmel–Muncie, IN CSA
Crescent City, CA μSA	26,410	27,743	−4.80%	Brookings–Crescent City, OR-CA CSA
Camden, AR μSA	26,363	27,389	−3.75%	
The Dalles, OR μSA	26,310	26,670	−1.35%	
Ottawa, KS μSA	26,299	25,996	+1.17%	Kansas City–Overland Park–Kansas City, MO-KS CSA
Lexington, NE μSA	26,255	26,004	+0.97%	
Macomb, IL μSA	25,916	27,238	−4.85%	
Mitchell, SD μSA	25,913	25,747	+0.64%	
La Grande, OR μSA	25,900	26,196	−1.13%	
Fallon, NV μSA	25,851	25,516	+1.31%	Reno–Carson City–Gardnerville Ranchos, NV-CA CSA
Le Mars, IA μSA	25,697	25,698	0.00%	Sioux City–Le Mars, IA-NE-SD CSA
Marshall, MN μSA	25,684	25,269	+1.64%	
New Ulm, MN μSA	25,517	25,912	−1.52%	Mankato–New Ulm, MN CSA
Deming, NM μSA	25,407	25,427	−0.08%	
Summerville, GA μSA	25,300	24,965	+1.34%	Chattanooga–Cleveland–Dalton, TN-GA-AL CSA
Monticello, IN μSA	25,164	24,688	+1.93%	Lafayette–West Lafayette–Frankfort, IN CSA
Uvalde, TX μSA	24,963	24,564	+1.62%	
Great Bend, KS μSA	24,790	25,493	−2.76%	
Altus, OK μSA	24,764	24,785	−0.08%	
Mexico, MO μSA	24,528	24,962	−1.74%	Columbia–Jefferson City–Moberly, MO CSA
Moberly, MO μSA	24,513	24,716	−0.82%	Columbia–Jefferson City–Moberly, MO CSA
Hood River, OR μSA	23,720	23,977	−1.07%	
Yankton, SD μSA	23,635	23,310	+1.39%	
Connersville, IN μSA	23,533	23,398	+0.58%	Richmond–Connersville, IN CSA
Evanston, WY-UT μSA	23,415	22,960	+1.98%	
Marshall, MO μSA	23,265	23,333	−0.29%	
Wahpeton, ND-MN μSA	23,019	23,035	−0.07%	Fargo–Wahpeton, ND-MN CSA
Middlesborough, KY μSA	22,829	24,097	−5.26%	Middlesboro–Corbin, KY CSA
Brookings, OR μSA	22,621	23,446	−3.52%	Brookings–Crescent City, OR-CA CSA
Worthington, MN μSA	22,338	22,290	+0.22%	
Elk City, OK μSA	22,159	22,410	−1.12%	Weatherford–Elk City, OK CSA
Magnolia, AR μSA	21,894	22,801	−3.98%	
Dumas, TX μSA	21,891	21,358	+2.50%	
Oskaloosa, IA μSA	21,880	22,190	−1.40%	Des Moines–West Des Moines–Ames, IA CSA
Forrest City, AR μSA	21,800	23,090	−5.59%	Memphis–Clarksdale–Forrest City, TN-MS-AR CSA
Pampa, TX μSA	21,786	22,054	−1.22%	
Beatrice, NE μSA	21,711	21,704	+0.03%	Lincoln–Beatrice, NE CSA
Othello, WA μSA	21,488	20,613	+4.24%	Moses Lake–Othello, WA CSA
Jamestown, ND μSA	21,414	21,593	−0.83%	
Vineyard Haven, MA μSA	21,219	20,600	+3.00%	
Liberal, KS μSA	21,073	21,964	−4.06%	
Arkadelphia, AR μSA	20,938	21,446	−2.37%	
Franklin, KY μSA	20,788	19,594	+6.09%	Bowling Green–Glasgow–Franklin, KY CSA
Price, UT μSA	20,680	20,412	+1.31%	
Sterling, CO μSA	20,654	21,528	−4.06%	
Pierre, SD μSA	20,588	20,745	−0.76%	
Storm Lake, IA μSA	20,449	20,823	−1.80%	
Guymon, OK μSA	20,322	21,384	−4.97%	
Carroll, IA μSA	20,303	20,760	−2.20%	
Maryville, MO μSA	20,174	21,241	−5.02%	
Raymondville, TX μSA	19,971	20,164	−0.96%	Brownsville–Harlingen–Raymondville, TX CSA
Clarksdale, MS μSA	19,849	21,390	−7.20%	Memphis–Clarksdale–Forrest City, TN-MS-AR CSA
Ruidoso, NM μSA	19,844	20,269	−2.10%	
Woodward, OK μSA	19,827	20,470	−3.14%	
Borger, TX μSA	19,633	20,617	−4.77%	Amarillo–Borger, TX CSA
Huron, SD μSA	19,624	19,149	+2.48%	
Port Lavaca, TX μSA	19,599	20,106	−2.52%	Victoria–Port Lavaca, TX CSA
Fairmont, MN μSA	19,440	20,025	−2.92%	
Los Alamos, NM μSA	19,407	19,419	−0.06%	Albuquerque–Santa Fe–Los Alamos, NM CSA
Cordele, GA μSA	19,237	20,128	−4.43%	
Andrews, TX μSA	18,914	18,610	+1.63%	Midland–Odessa–Andrews, TX CSA
Hereford, TX μSA	18,626	18,583	+0.23%	
Bishop, CA μSA	18,158	19,016	−4.51%	
Spirit Lake, IA μSA	18,077	17,703	+2.11%	Spencer–Spirit Lake, IA CSA
Winnemucca, NV μSA	17,267	17,285	−0.10%	
Fitzgerald, GA μSA	17,099	17,194	−0.55%	
Baker City, OR μSA	16,658	16,668	−0.06%	
Spencer, IA μSA	16,202	16,384	−1.11%	Spencer–Spirit Lake, IA CSA
Atchison, KS μSA	16,172	16,348	−1.08%	Kansas City–Overland Park–Kansas City, MO-KS CSA
Snyder, TX μSA	16,162	16,932	−4.55%	
Vermillion, SD μSA	15,031	14,967	+0.43%	
Nantucket, MA μSA	14,758	14,255	+3.53%	
Sweetwater, TX μSA	14,117	14,738	−4.21%	Abilene–Sweetwater, TX CSA
Zapata, TX μSA	13,753	13,889	−0.98%	
Ketchikan, AK μSA	13,549	13,948	−2.86%	
Vernon, TX μSA	12,481	12,887	−3.15%	
Town of Pecos, TX μSA	12,138	14,748	−17.70%	

== Puerto Rico ==
This table lists the 4 μSAs (USAs) of Puerto Rico with the following information:

1. The μSA rank by population as of July 1, 2025, as estimated by the United States Census Bureau
2. The μSA name as designated by the United States Office of Management and Budget
3. The μSA population as of July 1, 2025, as estimated by the United States Census Bureau
4. The μSA population as of April 1, 2020, as enumerated by the 2020 United States census
5. The percent USA population change from April 1, 2020, to July 1, 2025
6. The combined statistical area (CSA) if the MSA is a component

μSAs of the Commonwealth of Puerto Rico
Rank	Micropolitan statistical area	2025 estimate	2020 census	Change	Encompassing combined statistical area
1	Coamo, PR μSA	52,623	54,949	−4.23%	Ponce–Coamo, PR Combined Statistical Area
2	Lares, PR μSA	27,744	28,105	−1.28%	San Juan–Bayamón, PR Combined Statistical Area
3	Utuado, PR μSA	26,894	28,287	−4.92%	San Juan–Bayamón, PR Combined Statistical Area
4	Coco, PR μSA	24,218	25,789	−6.09%	San Juan–Bayamón, PR Combined Statistical Area

== See also ==
- United States of America
  - Outline of the United States
- Demographics of the United States
  - United States Census Bureau
    - List of U.S. states and territories by population
    - List of United States cities by population
    - List of United States counties and county equivalents
  - United States Office of Management and Budget
    - Statistical area (United States)
      - Combined statistical area
      - Core-based statistical area (list)
        - Metropolitan statistical area
