= 1999 Washington Redskins season =

NFL team season

- Owner: Daniel Snyder
- General manager: Vinny Cerrato
- Head coach: Norv Turner
- Offensive coordinator: Norv Turner
- Defensive coordinator: Mike Nolan
- Home stadium: FedExField

Results
- Record: 10–6
- Division place: 1st NFC East
- Playoffs: Won Wild Card Playoffs (vs. Lions) 27–13; Lost Divisional Playoffs (at Buccaneers) 13–14
- Pro Bowlers: QB Brad Johnson; RB Stephen Davis; G Tré Johnson

The 1999 Washington Redskins season was the franchise's 68th season in the National Football League (NFL) and their 63rd in Washington, D.C. The team improved on their 6–10 record from 1998 to go 10–6. They succeeded to the extent of reaching their first postseason since 1992 and beating the Detroit Lions in the Wildcard round of the playoffs, their most recent home playoff victory. Their season would end after losing to the Tampa Bay Buccaneers by a single point in the divisional playoff round. The Redskins would not host a playoff game again until 2012.

The season would also be the first season for new team owner Daniel Snyder, who purchased the team prior to the start of the season from Jack Kent Cooke's estate. The sale was finalized by the Cooke family on July 13, 1999. It would be the fourth and final season that the Redskins qualified for the playoffs in the 1990s and for the next five seasons, the team fell out of contention. They returned to the playoffs in 2005, winning their second playoff game under Snyder's ownership.

== Offseason ==
=== NFL draft ===
The New Orleans Saints traded all of their draft picks to the Washington Redskins for the fifth overall selection, which they used to take running back Ricky Williams. It is the first time ever that an NFL team has had only one pick in a draft.

1999 Washington Redskins draft
Round	Pick	Player	Position	College	Notes
1	7	Champ Bailey *	Cornerback	Georgia	
2	37	Jon Jansen	Offensive tackle	Michigan	
4	107	Nate Stimson	Linebacker	Georgia Tech	
5	165	Derek Smith	Linebacker	Virginia Tech	
6	181	Jeff Hall	Placekicker	Tennessee	
7	217	Tim Alexander	Wide receiver	Oregon State	
Made roster * Made at least one Pro Bowl during career

== Personnel ==
=== Staff ===
1999 Washington Redskins staff
Front office: Owner – Daniel Snyder; Director of Player Personnel – Vinny Cerrato; Assistant General Manager – Bobby Mitchell; Head coaches: Head Coach – Norv Turner; Offensive coaches: Running Game Coordinator – Bobby Jackson; Passing Game Coordinator – Terry Robiskie; Quarterbacks – Rich Olson; Tight Ends – Mike Pope; Offensive Line – Russ Grimm; Offensive Assistant – Ed Sidwell	Defensive coaches: Defensive Coordinator/Linebackers – Mike Nolan; Defensive Line – Rubin Carter; Defensive Line – Earl Leggett; Defensive Backs – Tom Hayes; Defensive Assistant – Jeff FitzGerald; Special teams coaches: Special Teams – LeCharls McDaniel; Strength and conditioning: Strength – Dan Riley; Conditioning Director – Jason Arapoff

=== Roster ===
1999 Washington Redskins roster
Quarterbacks (QB): 14 Brad Johnson; 16 Rodney Peete; 11 Casey Weldon; Running backs (RB): 47 Larry Bowie; 37 Larry Centers FB; 48 Stephen Davis; 20 Skip Hicks; 30 Brian Mitchell RS; 45 Mike Sellers FB; Wide receivers (WR): 83 Albert Connell; 86 Irving Fryar; 88 Derrius Thompson; 87 James Thrash; 82 Michael Westbrook; Tight ends (TE): 80 Stephen Alexander; 88 James Jenkins	Offensive linemen (OL): 74 Brad Badger G; 73 Jamie Brown T; 64 Andy Heck T; 76 Jon Jansen T; 77 Tre' Johnson G; 69 Rod Milstead G; 52 Cory Raymer C; 63 Keith Sims G; 60 Mark Fischer C; 79 Kipp Vickers G; Defensive linemen (DL): 93 Marc Boutte DT; 78 Doug Brown DT; 99 Marco Coleman DE; 75 Anthony Cook DE; 72 N. D. Kalu DE; 90 Kenard Lang DE; 94 Dana Stubblefield DT; 71 Barron Tanner DT; 95 Dan Wilkinson DT	Linebackers (LB): 59 Shawn Barber OLB; 51 James Francis OLB; 56 Kurt Gouveia MLB; 54 Greg Jones OLB; 53 Eddie Mason OLB; 50 Derek Smith MLB; Defensive backs (DB): 24 Champ Bailey CB; 26 Curtis Buckley CB; 25 Tim Denton CB; 35 Leomont Evans FS; 28 Darrell Green CB; 21 Mark McMillian CB; 31 Darryl Pounds CB; 29 Sam Shade SS; 23 Matt Stevens FS; Special teams (ST): 5 Brett Conway K; 66 Dan Turk LS; 1 Matt Turk P	Practice squad: 32 Chad Dukes RB; 67 Juan Porter C; -- Myron Smith LB; -- David Terrell S; Reserve: 58 Malcolm Hamilton LB (IR); 27 Tito Paul CB (IR); 98 Twan Russell LB (IR); 62 Derek Smith G (IR); 55 Fred Strickland LB (IR); 53 active, 5 inactive, 4 practice squad Rookies in italics

== Regular season ==
=== Schedule ===
Week	Date	Opponent	Result	Record	Venue	Attendance
1	September 12	**Dallas Cowboys**	**L** 35–41 (OT)	0–1	Redskins Stadium	79,237
2	September 19	at **New York Giants**	**W** 50–21	1–1	Giants Stadium	73,170
3	September 26	at New York Jets	**W** 27–20	2–1	Giants Stadium	78,161
4	October 3	Carolina Panthers	**W** 38–36	3–1	Redskins Stadium	76,831
5	Bye					
6	October 17	at **Arizona Cardinals**	**W** 24–10	4–1	Sun Devil Stadium	55,893
7	October 24	at **Dallas Cowboys**	**L** 20–38	4–2	Texas Stadium	64,377
8	October 31	Chicago Bears	**W** 48–22	5–2	Redskins Stadium	77,621
9	November 7	Buffalo Bills	**L** 17–34	5–3	Redskins Stadium	78,721
10	November 14	at **Philadelphia Eagles**	**L** 28–35	5–4	Veterans Stadium	66,591
11	November 21	**New York Giants**	**W** 23–13	6–4	FedExField	78,641
12	November 28	**Philadelphia Eagles**	**W** 20–17 (OT)	7–4	FedExField	74,741
13	December 5	at Detroit Lions	**L** 17–33	7–5	Pontiac Silverdome	77,693
14	December 12	**Arizona Cardinals**	**W** 28–3	8–5	FedExField	75,851
15	December 19	at Indianapolis Colts	**L** 21–24	8–6	RCA Dome	57,012
16	December 26	at San Francisco 49ers	**W** 26–20 (OT)	9–6	3Com Park	68,329
17	January 2	Miami Dolphins	**W** 21–10	10–6	FedExField	78,106
Note: Intra-division opponents are in **bold** text.

=== Standings ===
NFC East
	W	L	T	PCT	PF	PA	STK
^{(3)} Washington Redskins	10	6	0	.625	443	377	W2
^{(5)} Dallas Cowboys	8	8	0	.500	352	276	W1
New York Giants	7	9	0	.438	299	358	L3
Arizona Cardinals	6	10	0	.375	245	382	L4
Philadelphia Eagles	5	11	0	.313	272	357	W2

== Playoffs ==
=== NFC Wild Card Game ===
Washington Redskins 27, Detroit Lions 13

Quarter	1	2	3	4	Total
Lions	0	0	0	13	13
Redskins	14	13	0	0	27

at FedExField, Landover, Maryland

- Game time: 4:00 p.m. EST
- Game weather: 50 °F (10 °C), partly cloudy
- Game attendance: 79,411
- Referee: Bob McElwee
- TV announcers (ABC): Al Michaels (play-by-play), Boomer Esiason (color commentator), and Lesley Visser (sideline reporter)

=== NFC Divisional Game ===
Tampa Bay Buccaneers 14 Washington Redskins 13

Saturday Jan 15, 2000

Start Time: 4:15pm

Stadium: Raymond James Stadium

Attendance: 65,835

	1	2	3	4	Final
Washington Redskins	0	3	10	0	13
Tampa Bay Buccaneers	0	0	7	7	14

The Redskins took a 13 - 0 lead with a field goal in the 2nd quarter, a 100-yard kickoff return for a touchdown by Brian Mitchell in the 3rd, and a second field goal by Brett Conway in the 3rd. The Buccaneers came back late in second half with a 2-yard touchdown run by Mike Alstott and a 1-yard touchdown pass from Shaun King to John Davis. The Redskins had an opportunity to win the game with a field goal as time expired, but the snap was botched.
