= 1998 Washington Redskins season =

NFL team season

- Owner: Jack Kent Cooke's estate
- General manager: Charley Casserly
- President: John Kent Cooke
- Head coach: Norv Turner
- Home stadium: Jack Kent Cooke Stadium

Results
- Record: 6–10
- Division place: 4th NFC East
- Playoffs: Did not qualify
- Pro Bowlers: P Matt Turk

The 1998 Washington Redskins season was the franchise's 67th season in the National Football League (NFL) and their 62nd in Washington, D.C. The team failed to improve on their 8–7–1 and finished fourth in the NFC East, with a record of 6–10 and missed the NFL playoffs for the sixth consecutive year. They started the season 0–7, before going 6–3 after their bye week.

After ranking 28th out of 30 NFL teams in defense against the run in 1997, the Redskins had tried to revamp their interior defensive line during the off-season. They had signed Dana Stubblefield from the San Francisco 49ers, and Dan Wilkinson from the Cincinnati Bengals. The acquisitions, in particular Stubblefield's, were eventually considered to have been costly failures though.

== Offseason ==
=== NFL draft ===
1998 Washington Redskins draft
Round	Pick	Player	Position	College	Notes
2	48	Stephen Alexander *	Tight end	Oklahoma	
3	69	Skip Hicks	Running back	UCLA	
4	113	Shawn Barber	Linebacker	Richmond	
5	140	Mark Fischer	Guard	Purdue	
6	170	Patrick Palmer	Wide receiver	Northwestern State	
7	191	David Terrell	Safety	UTEP	
7	206	Antwaune Ponds	Linebacker	Syracuse	
Made roster * Made at least one Pro Bowl during career

== Personnel ==
=== Staff ===
1998 Washington Redskins staff
Front office: President – John Kent Cooke; General Manager – Charley Casserly; Assistant General Manager – Bobby Mitchell; Head coaches: Head Coach – Norv Turner; Offensive coaches: Quarterbacks – Mike Martz; Running Backs – Bobby Jackson; Wide Receivers – Terry Robiskie; Tight Ends – Mike Pope; Offensive Line – Russ Grimm; Offensive Assistant – Ed Sidwell	Defensive coaches: Defensive Coordinator – Mike Nolan; Defensive Line – Earl Leggett; Linebackers – Dale Lindsey; Defensive Backs – Tom Hayes; Defensive Assistant – Jeff FitzGerald; Special teams coaches: Special Teams – LeCharls McDaniel; Strength and conditioning: Strength – Dan Riley; Conditioning Director – Jason Arapoff

=== Roster ===
1998 Washington Redskins roster
Quarterbacks (QB): 12 Gus Frerotte; 10 Trent Green; 11 Casey Weldon; Running backs (RB): 21 Terry Allen; 48 Stephen Davis; 20 Skip Hicks; 36 Le'Shai Maston; 30 Brian Mitchell; 45 Mike Sellers FB; Wide receivers (WR): 83 Albert Connell; 85 Henry Ellard; 86 Leslie Shepherd; 89 Chris Thomas; Tight ends (TE): 80 Stephen Alexander; 88 James Jenkins	Offensive linemen (OL): 74 Brad Badger G/T; 61 Lamont Burns G; 60 Mark Fischer C; 69 Rod Milstead G; 68 Joe Patton T/G; 67 Shar Pourdanesh T; 52 Cory Raymer C; 63 Keith Sims G; 79 Kipp Vickers G; 73 Paul Wiggins T; Defensive linemen (DL): 93 Marc Boutte DT; 78 Doug Brown DT; 92 Jamal Duff DE; 91 David Hoelscher DE; 72 N. D. Kalu DE; 97 Kelvin Kinney DE; 90 Kenard Lang DE; 94 Dana Stubblefield DT; 95 Dan Wilkinson DT	Linebackers (LB): 59 Shawn Barber OLB; 56 Chester Burnett MLB; 54 Greg Jones OLB; 53 Marvcus Patton MLB; 50 Derek Smith OLB; Defensive backs (DB): 41 Buddy Crutchfield CB; 25 Tim Denton CB; 26 Cris Dishman CB; 27 Greg Evans SS; 35 Leomont Evans SS; 28 Darrell Green CB; 31 Darryl Pounds CB; 24 Stanley Richard FS; 23 Matt Stevens FS; 22 Jamel Williams FS; Special teams (ST): 14 Cary Blanchard K; 5 Brett Conway K; 66 Dan Turk LS; 1 Matt Turk P	Practice squad: 32 Chad Dukes RB; 13 Junior Lord WR; 39 Norman Miller RB; 64 Ozell Powell T; 71 Rahmaan Streater DE; Reserve: 84 Jamie Asher TE (IR); 47 Larry Bowie FB (IR); 37 Jesse Campbell S (IR); 75 Bob Dahl G (IR); 70 Troy Drake T (IR); 55 Malcolm Hamilton LB (IR); 57 Ken Harvey LB (IR); 15 Jeff Hostetler QB (IR); 77 Tre' Johnson G (IR); 96 Rich Owens DE (IR); 51 Antwaune Ponds LB (IR); 98 Twan Russell LB (IR); 87 James Thrash WR (IR); 82 Michael Westbrook WR (IR); 53 active, 14 inactive, 5 practice squad Rookies in italics

== Regular season ==
=== Schedule ===
Week	Date	Opponent	Result	Record	Venue	Attendance
1	September 6	at **New York Giants**	**L** 24–31	0–1	Giants Stadium	76,629
2	September 14	San Francisco 49ers	**L** 10–45	0–2	Jack Kent Cooke Stadium	76,798
3	September 20	at Seattle Seahawks	**L** 14–24	0–3	Kingdome	63,336
4	September 27	Denver Broncos	**L** 16–38	0–4	Jack Kent Cooke Stadium	71,880
5	October 4	**Dallas Cowboys**	**L** 10–31	0–5	Jack Kent Cooke Stadium	72,284
6	October 11	at **Philadelphia Eagles**	**L** 12–17	0–6	Veterans Stadium	66,183
7	October 18	at Minnesota Vikings	**L** 7–41	0–7	Hubert H. Humphrey Metrodome	64,004
8	Bye					
9	November 1	**New York Giants**	**W** 21–14	1–7	Jack Kent Cooke Stadium	67,976
10	November 8	at **Arizona Cardinals**	**L** 27–29	1–8	Sun Devil Stadium	55,950
11	November 15	**Philadelphia Eagles**	**W** 28–3	2–8	Jack Kent Cooke Stadium	57,704
12	November 22	**Arizona Cardinals**	**L** 42–45	2–9	Jack Kent Cooke Stadium	63,435
13	November 29	at Oakland Raiders	**W** 29–19	3–9	Network Associates Coliseum	41,409
14	December 6	San Diego Chargers	**W** 24–20	4–9	Jack Kent Cooke Stadium	65,713
15	December 13	at Carolina Panthers	**W** 28–25	5–9	Ericcson Stadium	46,940
16	December 19	Tampa Bay Buccaneers	**W** 20–16	6–9	Jack Kent Cooke Stadium	66,309
17	December 27	at **Dallas Cowboys**	**L** 7–23	6–10	Texas Stadium	63,565

Note: Intra-division opponents are in bold text.

=== Standings ===
NFC East
	W	L	T	PCT	PF	PA	STK
^{(3)} Dallas Cowboys	10	6	0	.625	381	275	W2
^{(6)} Arizona Cardinals	9	7	0	.563	325	378	W3
New York Giants	8	8	0	.500	287	309	W4
Washington Redskins	6	10	0	.375	319	421	L1
Philadelphia Eagles	3	13	0	.188	161	344	L3
