= 1997 Washington Redskins season =

NFL team season

- Owner: Jack Kent Cooke's estate
- General manager: Charley Casserly
- President: John Kent Cooke
- Head coach: Norv Turner
- Offensive coordinator: Norv Turner
- Defensive coordinator: Mike Nolan
- Home stadium: Jack Kent Cooke Stadium

Results
- Record: 8–7–1
- Division place: 2nd NFC East
- Playoffs: Did not qualify
- Pro Bowlers: LB Ken Harvey; CB Darrell Green; CB Cris Dishman; P Matt Turk

The 1997 Washington Redskins season was the franchise's 66th season in the National Football League (NFL) and their 62nd in Washington, D.C. The team failed to improve on their 9–7 record from 1996 and finished 8–7–1, knocking them out of playoff contention for the fifth straight year. This was the Redskins' first season playing in their new stadium, Jack Kent Cooke Stadium, that would be later called FedExField.

In an infamous game with the New York Giants on November 23, 1997, quarterback Gus Frerotte sprained his neck by ramming his head into a padded cement wall during a touchdown celebration and missed the rest of the game. Jeff Hostetler would throw three interceptions and lose a fumble in relief, with three of those turnovers occurring in overtime that was capped off with a potential game-winning 54-yard field goal by Scott Blanton being shanked wide right. The game ended in a 7–7 tie, the first in team history since 1971. They finished the season with eight wins while two of the Wild Card team went in with 9–7 records.

== Offseason ==
=== NFL draft ===
1997 Washington Redskins draft
Round	Pick	Player	Position	College	Notes
1	17	Kenard Lang	Defensive end	Miami (FL)	
2	51	Greg Jones	Linebacker	Colorado	
3	80	Derek Smith	Linebacker	Arizona State	
4	115	Albert Connell	Wide receiver	Texas A&M	
5	132	Jamel Williams	Safety	Nebraska	
5	140	Keith Thibodeaux	Cornerback	Northwestern State	
5	148	Twan Russell	Linebacker	Miami (FL)	
5	162	Brad Badger	Guard	Stanford	
Made roster

== Personnel ==
=== Staff ===
1997 Washington Redskins staff
Front office: President – John Kent Cooke; General manager – Charley Casserly; Assistant general manager – Bobby Mitchell; Head coaches: Head coach – Norv Turner; Offensive coaches: Quarterbacks – Mike Martz; Running backs – Bobby Jackson; Wide receivers – Terry Robiskie; Tight ends – Mike Pope; Offensive line – Russ Grimm	Defensive coaches: Defensive coordinator – Mike Nolan; Defensive line – Earl Leggett; Linebackers – Dale Lindsey; Defensive backs – Tom Hayes; Defensive assistant – LeCharls McDaniel; Special teams coaches: Special teams – Pete Rodriguez; Strength and conditioning: Strength – Dan Riley; Conditioning Director – Jason Arapoff

=== Roster ===
1997 Washington Redskins roster
Quarterbacks (QB): 10 Trent Green; 15 Jeff Hostetler; 11 Jamie Martin; Running backs (RB): 21 Terry Allen; 47 Larry Bowie; 48 Stephen Davis; 20 Marc Logan; 30 Brian Mitchell; Wide receivers (WR): 83 Albert Connell; 85 Henry Ellard; 89 Chris Thomas; 87 James Thrash; 82 Michael Westbrook; Tight ends (TE): 84 Jamie Asher; 80 David Frisch; 88 James Jenkins	Offensive linemen (OL): 73 Darryl Ashmore T; 74 Brad Badger G; 75 Bob Dahl G; 68 Joe Patton G/T; 67 Shar Pourdanesh T; 52 Cory Raymer C; 76 Ed Simmons T; 63 Keith Sims G; 55 Jeff Uhlenhake C; Defensive linemen (DL): 93 Marc Boutte DT; 92 Jamal Duff DE; 79 Steve Emtman DE; 95 William Gaines DT; 97 Kelvin Kinney DE; 99 Ryan Kuehl DT; 90 Kenard Lang DE; 91 Chris Mims DT; 96 Rich Owens DE; 78 Chris Zorich DT	Linebackers (LB): 58 Patrise Alexander MLB; 57 Ken Harvey OLB; 54 Greg Jones OLB; 53 Marvcus Patton MLB; 98 Twan Russell OLB; 50 Derek Smith OLB; Defensive backs (DB): 37 Jesse Campbell SS; 26 Cris Dishman CB; 35 Leomont Evans FS; 28 Darrell Green CB; 31 Darryl Pounds CB/S; 24 Stanley Richard FS; 32 Keith Thibodeaux CB; 22 Jamel Williams SS; Special teams (ST): 16 Scott Blanton K; 13 Chris Jacke K; 66 Dan Turk LS; 1 Matt Turk P	Practice squad: 61 Malcolm Hamilton LB; 69 Jeff Miller T; 66 Ozell Powell T; 46 Chris Sanders TE; Reserve: 12 Gus Frerotte QB (IR); 14 Karl Hankton WR (IR); 77 Tre' Johnson G (IR); 86 Leslie Shepherd WR (IR); 29 Scott Turner CB (IR); 53 active, 5 inactive, 4 practice squad Rookies in italics

== Regular season ==
=== Schedule ===
Week	Date	Opponent	Result	Record	Venue	Attendance
1	August 31	at Carolina Panthers	W 24–10	1–0	Ericsson Stadium	72,633
2	September 7	at Pittsburgh Steelers	L 13–14	1–1	Three Rivers Stadium	58,059
3	September 14	Arizona Cardinals	W 19–13	2–1	Jack Kent Cooke Stadium	78,270
4	Bye					
5	September 28	Jacksonville Jaguars	W 24–12	3–1	Jack Kent Cooke Stadium	74,421
6	October 5	at Philadelphia Eagles	L 10–24	3–2	Veterans Stadium	67,008
7	October 13	Dallas Cowboys	W 21–16	4–2	Jack Kent Cooke Stadium	76,159
8	October 19	at Tennessee Oilers	L 14–28	4–3	Liberty Bowl Memorial Stadium	31,042
9	October 26	Baltimore Ravens	L 17–20	4–4	Jack Kent Cooke Stadium	75,067
10	November 2	at Chicago Bears	W 31–8	5–4	Soldier Field	53,032
11	November 9	Detroit Lions	W 30–7	6–4	Jack Kent Cooke Stadium	75,162
12	November 16	at Dallas Cowboys	L 14–17	6–5	Texas Stadium	64,559
13	November 23	New York Giants	T 7–7	6–5–1	Jack Kent Cooke Stadium	75,703
14	November 30	St. Louis Rams	L 20–23	6–6–1	Jack Kent Cooke Stadium	74,772
15	December 7	at Arizona Cardinals	W 38–28	7–6–1	Sun Devil Stadium	41,537
16	December 13	at New York Giants	L 10–30	7–7–1	Giants Stadium	77,571
17	December 21	Philadelphia Eagles	W 35–32	8–7–1	Jack Kent Cooke Stadium	75,939

=== Standings ===
NFC East
	W	L	T	PCT	PF	PA	STK
^{(3)} New York Giants	10	5	1	.656	307	265	W3
Washington Redskins	8	7	1	.531	327	289	W1
Philadelphia Eagles	6	9	1	.406	317	372	L3
Dallas Cowboys	6	10	0	.375	304	314	L5
Arizona Cardinals	4	12	0	.250	283	379	W1
