= 2000 Washington Redskins season =

NFL team season

- Owner: Daniel Snyder
- General manager: Vinny Cerrato
- Head coach: Norv Turner (fired December 4, 7–6 record); Terry Robiskie (interim; 1–2 record)
- Defensive coordinator: Ray Rhodes
- Home stadium: FedExField

Results
- Record: 8–8
- Division place: 3rd NFC East
- Playoffs: Did not qualify
- Pro Bowlers: RB Stephen Davis; TE Stephen Alexander; CB Champ Bailey; DE Marco Coleman

The 2000 season was the Washington Redskins' 69th season in the National Football League (NFL) and their 64th in Washington, D.C. The team was looking to improve on its 10–6 mark from 1999, which saw the Redskins win the NFC East for the first time since 1991 and win a playoff game for the first time since 1992. Norv Turner returned to lead the team for a seventh season. However, he got fired after a 7–6 start.

The Redskins rolled to a 6–2 start, but they collapsed in the second half of season, going 2–6, and went 8–8 to place 3rd in the NFC East, unable to improve on their NFC East-winning 10–6 record from 1999 or qualify for the playoffs. This was the final season Eddie Murray and Irving Fryar would play in the NFL.

== Background ==
Redskins owner Dan Snyder made it a point during the off-season to stack his team with talent. The Redskins entered the 2000 NFL draft with three first-round selections, the highest of which was the second overall pick which they had acquired in the Ricky Williams trade with the New Orleans Saints. With that pick, the Redskins selected linebacker Lavar Arrington from Penn State, who would go on to be a three-time Pro Bowler for the team. The other two picks were traded to the San Francisco 49ers in order to move up to the third overall pick, which the Redskins used to select Alabama offensive tackle Chris Samuels, a six-time future Pro Bowler and multi-year starter at left tackle.

In addition to these moves, Snyder also made a push for several veteran free agents to bolster the roster, signing quarterback Jeff George from the Minnesota Vikings to compete with Brad Johnson for starting quarterback. Snyder also signed veteran guard Jay Leeuwenberg and future Pro Bowl wide receiver Andre Reed after Reed was released by the Denver Broncos.

On the defensive side, the Redskins made three major acquisitions. Longtime Buffalo Bills defensive stalwart Bruce Smith was signed to play defensive end and add more experience to the front four of the Redskins. The secondary saw the addition of safety Mark Carrier, who Snyder signed from the Detroit Lions, and multi-time All Pro cornerback Deion Sanders, who left the division-rival Dallas Cowboys after five years to join the Redskins. With the new acquisitions, expectations for the season were elevated that the Redskins would compete to represent the NFC in Super Bowl XXXV, if not to win their fourth Vince Lombardi trophy outright.

The Redskins started out winning six of their first eight games, living up to expectations with game victories. Their on-field performance, however, belied their record. In those eight games, the Redskins did not score more than 21 points aside from a 35–16 victory over the Jacksonville Jaguars.

In their next two games before their bye week, the Redskins faced the defending AFC champion Tennessee Titans, who entered the Monday night matchup having won seven consecutive games, and the Arizona Cardinals, whose 2–5 start had led to the firing of Vince Tobin. The Redskins lost both games, dropping their record to 6–4.

Returning from their bye week, the Redskins managed to beat the defending world champion St. Louis Rams 33–20 in another Monday night matchup. After that, the Redskins lost back-to-back games to their divisional rivals, the Philadelphia Eagles and the New York Giants, dropping their season record to 7-6 and all but eliminating them from playoff contention. After the loss to the Giants, Snyder fired head coach Norv Turner and replaced him with offensive coordinator Terry Robiskie, who immediately benched Johnson and named George the starter for the remainder of the year.

The Redskins fared no better under Robiskie or George, as they lost their first game under the new regime to the Dallas Cowboys at Texas Stadium. Washington managed to knock Troy Aikman out of the game with a concussion, which would eventually force him into retirement at the end of the season, but were beaten by Anthony Wright, his backup, 32–14 in what would be their final win of a 5–11 season. The Redskins followed this up by traveling to play the Pittsburgh Steelers in the final game played at Three Rivers Stadium, which they lost 24–3. The Redskins managed to avenge their loss to the Cardinals in the final week of the season, which brought their final record to 8-8, which was not sufficient for playoff eligibility.

== Offseason ==
=== Draft ===
2000 Washington Redskins draft
Round	Selection	Player	Position	College
1	2	LaVar Arrington	Linebacker	Penn State
1	3	Chris Samuels	Tackle	Alabama
3	64	Lloyd Harrison	Cornerback	North Carolina State
4	129	Michael Moore	Guard	Troy
5	155	Quincy Sanders	Cornerback	UNLV
6	202	Todd Husak	Quarterback	Stanford
7	216	Delbert Cowsette	Defensive Tackle	Maryland
7	250	Ethan Howell	Wide Receiver	Oklahoma State

== Personnel ==
=== Staff ===
2000 Washington Redskins staff
Front office: Owner – Daniel Snyder; Director of player personnel – Vinny Cerrato; Assistant general manager – Bobby Mitchell; Head coaches: Head coach – Norv Turner; Offensive coaches: Pass game coordinator – Terry Robiskie; Quarterbacks – Rich Olson; Running backs – Kirby Wilson; Tight ends – Pat Flaherty; Offensive line – Russ Grimm; Offensive assistant – Jason Verduzco	Defensive coaches: Defensive coordinator – Ray Rhodes; Defensive line – Rubin Carter; Defensive line – Mike Trgovac; Linebackers – Foge Fazio; Defensive backs – Ron Meeks; Defensive assistant – Kirk Olivadotti; Special teams coaches: Special teams – LeCharls McDaniel; Strength and conditioning: Strength – Dan Riley; Conditioning director – Jason Arapoff

=== Roster ===
2000 Washington Redskins roster
Quarterbacks (QB): 3 Jeff George; 8 Todd Husak; 14 Brad Johnson; Running backs (RB): 37 Larry Centers FB; 48 Stephen Davis; 20 Skip Hicks; 47 Bryan Johnson; 22 Adrian Murrell; 45 Mike Sellers FB; Wide receivers (WR): 83 Albert Connell; 86 Irving Fryar; 19 Kenny Shedd; 13 Derrius Thompson; 87 James Thrash; Tight ends (TE): 80 Stephen Alexander; 89 Zeron Flemister	Offensive linemen (OL): 69 Ed Ellis T; 51 Mark Fischer C; 67 Derrick Fletcher G; 64 Andy Heck G/T; 68 Tony Hutson G/T; 76 Jon Jansen T; 57 Jay Leeuwenburg G; 66 Michael Moore G; 60 Chris Samuels T; Defensive linemen (DL): 99 Marco Coleman DE; 91 Delbert Cowsette DT; 75 Derrick Ham DE; 74 Nolan Harrison DT; 72 N. D. Kalu DE; 90 Kenard Lang DE/DT; 78 Bruce Smith DE; 94 Dana Stubblefield DT; 95 Dan Wilkinson DT	Linebackers (LB): 56 LaVar Arrington OLB; 59 Shawn Barber OLB; 54 Greg Jones OLB; 53 Eddie Mason OLB; 55 Kevin Mitchell MLB; 50 Derek Smith MLB; Defensive backs (DB): 24 Champ Bailey CB; 27 Mark Carrier FS; 26 Tyronne Drakeford CB; 28 Darrell Green CB; 41 Lloyd Harrison CB; 21 Deion Sanders CB; 29 Sam Shade SS; 34 Josh Symonette FS; 31 David Terrell CB/S; Special teams (ST): 6 Tommy Barnhardt P; 1 Scott Bentley K; 2 Eddie Murray K; 85 Joe Zelenka LS	Practice squad: 92 Jerry DeLoach DT; 62 Ryan Kalich G; Reserve: 40 Gerard Arnold RB (IR); -- Curtis Buckley S (IR); 88 James Jenkins TE (IR); 77 Tre' Johnson G (IR); 98 Tyrus McCloud LB (IR); 52 Cory Raymer C (IR); 84 Andre Reed WR (IR); 63 Keith Sims G (IR); 70 Derek Smith G (IR); 82 Michael Westbrook WR (IR); 53 active, 10 inactive, 2 practice squad Rookies in italics

== Preseason ==
Week	Date	Opponent	Result	Record	Venue	Recap
1	August 4	at Tampa Bay Buccaneers	L 12–13	0–1	Raymond James Stadium	Recap
2	August 11	New England Patriots	W 30–20	1–1	FedExField	Recap
3	August 19	at Cleveland Browns	W 24–0	2–1	Cleveland Browns Stadium	Recap
4	August 25	Pittsburgh Steelers	W 17–10	3–1	FedExField	Recap

== Regular season ==
=== Schedule ===
Week	Date	Opponent	Result	Record	Venue	Attendance
1	September 3	Carolina Panthers	W 20–17	1–0	FedExField	80,257
2	September 10	at Detroit Lions	L 10–15	1–1	Pontiac Silverdome	74,159
3	September 18	Dallas Cowboys	L 21–27	1–2	FedExField	84,431
4	September 24	at New York Giants	W 16–6	2–2	Giants Stadium	78,216
5	October 1	Tampa Bay Buccaneers	W 20–17 (OT)	3–2	FedExField	83,532
6	October 8	at Philadelphia Eagles	W 17–14	4–2	Veterans Stadium	65,491
7	October 15	Baltimore Ravens	W 10–3	5–2	FedExField	83,252
8	October 22	at Jacksonville Jaguars	W 35–16	6–2	Alltel Stadium	69,061
9	October 30	Tennessee Titans	L 21–27	6–3	FedExField	83,472
10	November 5	at Arizona Cardinals	L 15–16	6–4	Sun Devil Stadium	52,244
11	Bye					
12	November 20	at St. Louis Rams	W 33–20	7–4	Trans World Dome	66,087
13	November 26	Philadelphia Eagles	L 20–23	7–5	FedExField	83,284
14	December 3	New York Giants	L 7–9	7–6	FedExField	83,485
15	December 10	at Dallas Cowboys	L 13–32	7–7	Texas Stadium	63,467
16	December 16	at Pittsburgh Steelers	L 3–24	7–8	Three Rivers Stadium	58,183
17	December 24	Arizona Cardinals	W 20–3	8–8	FedExField	65,711

=== Standings ===
NFC East
	W	L	T	PCT	PF	PA	STK
^{(1)} New York Giants	12	4	0	.750	328	246	W5
^{(4)} Philadelphia Eagles	11	5	0	.688	351	245	W2
Washington Redskins	8	8	0	.500	281	269	W1
Dallas Cowboys	5	11	0	.313	294	361	L2
Arizona Cardinals	3	13	0	.188	210	443	L7

=== Best performances ===
- Marco Coleman, Week 1, 2.5 Quarterback Sacks vs. Carolina Panthers
- Marco Coleman, Week 5, 3.0 Quarterback Sacks vs. Tampa Bay Buccaneers
- Albert Connell, 3rd Best Receiving Performance of Season, 211 Receiving Yards vs. Jacksonville Jaguars, October 22
- Bruce Smith, Week 12, 3.0 Quarterback Sacks vs. St. Louis Rams

== Player stats ==
=== Passing ===
Player	Comp	Att	Pct	Yds	TD	Int	Rate
Brad Johnson	228	365	62.5	2,505	11	15	75.7
Jeff George	113	194	58.2	1,389	7	6	79.6

=== Rushing ===
Player	Attempts	Yards	Average	Long	Touchdowns
Stephen Davis	332	1318	4.0	50	11
Larry Centers	19	103	5.4	14	0
James Thrash	10	82	8.2	34	0
Skip Hicks	29	78	2.7	12	1
Brad Johnson	22	58	2.6	21	1
Jeff George	7	24	3.4	14	0

=== Receiving ===
Player	Receptions	Yards	Average	Long	Touchdowns
Larry Centers	81	600	7.4	26	3
James Thrash	50	653	13.1	50	2
Stephen Alexander	47	510	10.9	30	2
Irving Fryar	41	548	13.4	34	5
Albert Connell	39	762	19.5	77	3
Stephen Davis	33	313	9.5	39	0
Adrian Murrell	16	93	5.8	12	0
Andre Reed	10	103	10.3	21	1
Michael Westbrook	9	103	11.4	21	0

=== Sacks ===
Player	Number
Marco Coleman	12.0
Bruce Smith	10.0
LaVar Arrington	4.0
Dan Wilkinson	3.5

== Awards and records ==
- LaVar Arrington, PFW/Pro Football Writers of America All-Rookie Team
- Marco Coleman, NFC Defensive Player of the Week, week 5
- Albert Connell, NFC Offensive Player of the Week, week 8
- Deion Sanders, NFL Defensive Player of the Week, week 5
- Chris Samuels, PFW/Pro Football Writers of America All-Rookie Team
- Bruce Smith, NFC Defensive Player of the Week, week 12
