= Dan Wilkinson =

American football player (born 1973)

No. 99, 95, 72
- Position: Defensive tackle

Personal information
- Born: March 13, 1973 (age 53); Dayton, Ohio, U.S.
- Listed height: 6 ft 4 in (1.93 m)
- Listed weight: 340 lb (154 kg)

Career information
- High school: Dunbar (Dayton)
- College: Ohio State (1991–1993)
- NFL draft: 1994: 1st round, 1st overall pick

Career history
- Cincinnati Bengals (1994–1997); Washington Redskins (1998–2002); Detroit Lions (2003–2005); Miami Dolphins (2006)

Awards and highlights
- Bill Willis Trophy (1993); Consensus All-American (1993); Big Ten Co-Defensive Player of the Year (1993); Big Ten Defensive Lineman of the Year (1993); 2× Second-team All-Big Ten (1992, 1993)

Career NFL statistics
- Tackles: 390
- Sacks: 54.5
- Forced fumbles: 6
- Fumble recoveries: 4
- Interceptions: 5
- Defensive touchdowns: 1
- Stats at Pro Football Reference

Daniel Raymon Wilkinson (born March 13, 1973), nicknamed "Big Daddy", is an American former professional football player who was a defensive tackle in the National Football League (NFL) for 13 seasons. He played college football for the Ohio State Buckeyes, where he received consensus All-American honors, and was selected first overall by the Cincinnati Bengals in the 1994 NFL draft. He was also a member of the Washington Redskins, Detroit Lions, and Miami Dolphins.

== Early life ==
Wilkinson was born in Dayton, Ohio. He attended Dunbar High School in Dayton, and played for the Dunbar Wolverines high school football team. His football coach at Stivers Intermediate School, Albert Powell, gave Wilkinson the nickname "Big Daddy", after convincing him to play defensive line instead of fullback. Powell later said, "Carl Hairston was in Cleveland at the time, so I told Dan, 'You're our Big Daddy.'"

== College career ==
Wilkinson received an athletic scholarship to attend Ohio State University, where he played for the Ohio State Buckeyes football team from 1991 to 1993. During his freshman season in 1991, the Buckeyes coaches redshirted and placed him on the scout team. At the time, Wilkinson weighed 348 pounds and played offensive tackle. During the season, he lost 48 pounds and began to play defense.

Lining up next to Alonzo Spellman during his sophomore year, Wilkinson earned All-Big Ten honors after he had 46 tackles, 10.5 tackles-for-loss, and 6.5 sacks. Playing under tackle next to nose guard Luke Fickell as a junior in 1993, Wilkinson finished with 44 tackles and 13 tackles-for-loss. He earned first-team All-Big Ten honors and was recognized as a consensus first-team All-American. He decided to forgo his final season of college eligibility and subsequently declared for the 1994 NFL draft.

== Professional career ==
Pre-draft measurables
Height	Weight	Arm length	Hand span	Bench press
6 ft 3 5/8 in (1.92 m)	327 lb (148 kg)	33 3/4 in (0.86 m)	10 1/4 in (0.26 m)	32 reps
All values from NFL Combine

=== 1994 NFL draft ===
Along with running back Marshall Faulk and quarterbacks Heath Shuler and Trent Dilfer, Wilkinson was regarded as "one of the four players who rank well above the others in this draft". In workouts prior to the draft, Wilkinson weighed in at 315 pounds, bench-pressed 225 pounds 34 times and ran a remarkably fast 40 yards in 4.72 seconds. "Wilkinson could be a once-in-10-years player," said Billy Devaney, then San Diego Chargers' director of player personnel. Also described as "maybe the best defensive line prospect since Reggie White [in 1984]," Wilkinson drew a lot of interest from around the league. Several teams were willing to trade with the Cincinnati Bengals for the No. 1 draft pick, including the New England Patriots, who reportedly offered their first-round pick (4th overall), plus several players including offensive guard Eugene Chung (their first-round choice in 1992), and the Arizona Cardinals, who offered their pick plus running back Garrison Hearst (their 1993 first-rounder). Eventually, the Bengals decided to keep the pick, and decided not to select a quarterback, since they already picked David Klingler in 1992.

Becoming the third defensive lineman in four years—after Russell Maryland and Steve Emtman—to be selected first overall, Wilkinson was chosen by the Bengals. He was only the second Ohio State defensive player to go No. 1, after Tom Cousineau in 1979.

=== Cincinnati Bengals ===
After an 11-day holdout, Wilkinson signed a six-year, $14.4 million ($31.3 million in current value) contract with the Cincinnati Bengals on May 5, 1994, becoming the highest-paid player in their franchise history. While in training camp, Bengals coaches compared Wilkinson to All-Pro offensive tackle Anthony Muñoz in terms of talent. Wilkinson remained with the team from 1994 to 1997. During his rookie season, Wilkinson led the team with 19 quarterback hurries. He set a season-high and led the team with seven tackles against the Indianapolis Colts on November 20. During the season finale against the Philadelphia Eagles on December 20, Wilkinson volunteered to give up his starting spot so Bengals great Tim Krumrie could start his final home game. Wilkinson still made two sacks in a reserve role.

Wilkinson set a career-high with eight quarterback sacks in 1995—a total which led all AFC interior linemen that season and was the most by a Bengals interior lineman since Mike Reid in 1972. Wilkinson's 18 quarterback hurries were second on the team and he played in 829 snaps, second-most on the defensive line. He spent time at both defensive tackle positions and right defensive end. He played the first two games of the regular season with a cast on his hand after breaking his ring finger in the final preseason game. He registered two sacks and led defensive line with five tackles (all solo) in win against the Jacksonville Jaguars on September 10 and sacked quarterback Mark Brunell on fourth down in the final minute of the game to preserve the Bengals win. Wilkinson suffered a neck injury against the Chicago Bears on December 10 and was inactive for the final two games of the season.

Wilkinson led the Bengals in sacks for the first time in 1996 with 6.5, including one in each of the first five games, and also led the defensive line with 37 solo tackles. He led a rushing defense which allowed fewest yards per game (102.7) since the 1983 Bengals allowed 93.7. He opened the year with a season-high eight tackles, a sack and five quarterback hurries against the St. Louis Rams on September 1. He made his first career interception against the Baltimore Ravens on November 3, picking off a Vinny Testaverde pass.

In 1997, Wilkinson played much of the season at right defensive end after the Bengals converted to a 3-4 defense, totaling a team-high five sacks. He was awarded the team's defensive game ball for his play in Cincinnati's victory over the Jacksonville Jaguars on November 23. He missed his only game of the season against the Dallas Cowboys on December 14 with a stinger in his neck.

=== Washington Redskins ===
In December 1997, Wilkinson clashed with ownership and the city he played in. He was disappointed when the Bengals placed the franchise tag on him during the offseason. He also called Cincinnati a "racist" city, saying its residents were "prejudiced and uptight and stiff." The remarks caused owner Mike Brown to act, and on February 26, 1998, Wilkinson was traded to the Washington Redskins. That same week, the Redskins had also acquired the reigning NFL Defensive Player of the Year, Dana Stubblefield, from the San Francisco 49ers.

Wilkinson was very productive during his first season in Washington, leading the team in sacks (7.5), quarterback pressures (50) and tackles-for-loss (six). His 50 quarterback pressures were 30 more than the team's No. 2 man in that category (defensive end Kenard Lang). Wilkinson set career highs in total tackles (60) and solo stops (45), playing in more snaps (1,037) than any other defensive tackle in the NFL that season. He intercepted his second career pass against Philadelphia on November 15 when he picked off the deflected pass deep in Eagles territory and ran four yards before being tackled, setting up the Redskins' first touchdown. He also performed well against the New York Giants on November 1 with 14 QB pressures, seven tackles and a pass deflection. He tied a career-high with eight tackles against the Arizona Cardinals on November 22.

Wilkinson led the Redskins with eight sacks to match his career-high from 1995 and finished second in quarterback pressures (43) in 1999. In a Week 7 game against the Chicago Bears, Redskins defensive end Marco Coleman hit Bears quarterback Shane Matthews, forcing the ball into Wilkinson's hands. He returned it (at a comfortable pace) 88 yards for a touchdown, with speedster Darrell Green escorting him most of the way. The play gave the Redskins a 14–0 lead in their 48–22 win over Chicago and was the fourth-longest interception return for a score in Redskins history, the longest such return ever by a Redskins player at home and the longest return ever by a Redskins defensive lineman.

Wilkinson also racked up five tackles (three solo), two sacks, five pressures and a pass defensed at the New York Giants on September 19, when he was awarded a game ball along with the rest of the starting defensive line. He recorded a team-high nine pressures, a sack, two solos and one tackle-for-loss against the Arizona Cardinals on December 12.

In 2000, Wilkinson experienced the lowest sack total of his career at just 3.5 for the year. He made a season-high four tackles on two occasions, at the Dallas Cowboys and at Pittsburgh Steelers in consecutive weeks in mid-December. He had a season-long, nine-yard sack at the Jacksonville Jaguars on October 22.

While Wilkinson did not post entirely impressive statistics in 2001, he made key blocks allowing other defensive players to make big plays while also contributing in other ways. His pass deflection on second-and-goal led to an interception by Otis Leverette on the one-yard line and ended a critical scoring threat by the Carolina Panthers on October 21. The Redskins went on to beat the Panthers 17–14 in overtime. Although he posted no stats in the game, Wilkinson's pressure helped hold Philadelphia's offense to only 186 total yards. On the year, Wilkinson finished with 25 tackles (19 solo), four sacks and two interceptions. His two interceptions came off Donovan McNabb and Aaron Brooks.

Wilkinson experienced his worst season as a pro in 2002, which would prove to be his last with the Redskins. He recorded one tackle against the Dallas Cowboys on November 28 before leaving the game in the third quarter with a strained right calf. He was placed on injured reserve on December 5, ending his season. In the 12 games he played, he recorded 16 tackles (12 solo) and five pass deflections. It was the first season of his career in which he did not record a sack.

=== Detroit Lions ===
During the 2003 offseason, Wilkinson voiced his preference to stay in Washington and it appeared it would happen. The team wanted him to take a pay cut, since they considered Wilkinson's team-high $3.5 million salary "too much" for a player who had a career-low 17 tackles and no sacks in 2002. But negotiations with Wilkinson's agent fell through, and he was cut by the team on July 29. Wilkinson received interest from the Dallas Cowboys, Green Bay Packers, and New England Patriots and approximately four other organizations. On August 17, he agreed to sign with the Detroit Lions.

In Wilkinson's first regular season game with the Lions against the Arizona Cardinals on September 7, he recorded three solo tackles, five quarterback hurries, two passes defensed and a nine-yard sack of quarterback Jeff Blake—the first Lions' sack of the season. His best game of the season came against the Green Bay Packers on November 27 with a sack of Brett Favre, his first fumble recovery of 2003, two quarterback pressures and a season-high six tackles (four solos). He notched a pass defense, two quarterback knockdowns and a pressure against the St. Louis Rams on December 28, helping hold the Rams’ rushing attack to just 41 yards.

Despite modest statistics (24 tackles and two sacks), Wilkinson made a significant impact on the Lions' run defense. He was named to Peter King of Sports Illustrated’s all-pro team.

In 2004, Wilkinson appeared in all 16 games for the Lions. He was a member of a defensive line unit that registered 30.5 sacks, the seventh-highest total among any front four in the NFL. The unit also started every game together during the season.

Wilkinson forced a fumble and sacked Eagles quarterback Donovan McNabb for a seven-yard loss against Philadelphia on September 26. He also set a career-high with two forced fumbles during the season. He was also instrumental in the development of younger players, including Pro Bowl defensive tackle Shaun Rogers and defensive end James Hall.

In the 2005 season, Wilkinson's last with the Lions, he played in all 16 games for the third straight year. He finished the season with 26 tackles (20 solo) and three sacks—his highest total in four seasons.

He recorded two Trent Dilfer sacks at the Cleveland Browns on October 23, for a loss of 10 yards. His sack in the first quarter for nine yards prevented the Browns from reaching the end zone, and forced a field goal attempt. He recorded his first career safety after punter Nick Harris downed a punt on the 2-yard line against the Arizona Cardinals on November 13. On the ensuing possession, he tackled Cardinals fullback Obafemi Ayanbadejo in the end zone in the first quarter. Wilkinson had a sack on December 4 against Minnesota Vikings quarterback Brad Johnson for a loss of seven yards to stop a potential scoring drive and force the Vikings to punt.

=== Miami Dolphins ===
During the 2006 offseason, the Lions unsuccessfully attempted to trade Wilkinson and subsequently released him on May 22. He received interest from multiple teams, and visited with the Miami Dolphins in early June. The two parties negotiated on a contract, but Wilkinson preferred to not sign until later so as not to go through the rigors of an entire training camp at his age. He officially signed a three-year deal with the team on August 14. It was officially a three-year, $6.31 million contract, although it was structured in a way that would essentially make it a one-year deal. Wilkinson received a $500,000 signing bonus and had a $810,000 in base salary in 2006. His base salary was scheduled to jump to $2 million in 2007 and $2.5 million in 2008, and he was due a $500,000 roster bonus in the 2008 offseason.

Wilkinson played in a reserve role most of the season behind Keith Traylor and Jeff Zgonina, battling nagging injuries and dealing with a lawsuit which caused him to miss time. In 10 games played, he recorded 13 tackles (nine solo) and three pass deflections. On December 21, Wilkinson was placed on season-ending injured reserve with knee and hamstring injuries.

In the 2007 offseason, the Dolphins attempted to trade Wilkinson to the Denver Broncos in exchange for a sixth-round draft pick in the 2007 NFL draft. Wilkinson failed to contact either team, and while deadlines for him to report were extended during the offseason, the trade fell through and was voided on March 31. On June 18, the Dolphins released Wilkinson.

=== Career transactions ===
- Drafted by the Bengals in the first round (first overall) of the 1994 NFL Draft in April 1994.
- Traded to the Redskins on February 26, 1998.
- Released by the Redskins on July 29, 2003.
- Signed by the Lions on August 17, 2003.
- Released by the Lions on May 22, 2006.
- Signed by the Dolphins on August 14, 2006.
- Released by the Dolphins on June 18, 2007.

== Personal life ==
The second-youngest of eleven children, Wilkinson was born in Dayton, Ohio, to Oliver Sr and Veronda Wilkinson.

Wilkinson had four children with his ex-wife Shawnda: Brooklyn, Daniel Ramon Jr., Taylor, and Sydné. He is now remarried and has had two more children, Kennedy and Klarke. They reside in Potomac, Maryland.

=== Legal troubles ===
In 1996, Wilkinson pleaded no contest to the charge of domestic violence. He was subsequently found guilty of striking his pregnant girlfriend. Wilkinson's girlfriend, however, stated that she did not wish to pursue prosecution.

In March 2006, Capital Centre LLC, a joint project headed by the Cordish Company and Washington Sports & Entertainment, sued Wilkinson. The suit alleged that Wilkinson was personally liable for a breach of contract related to a lease the two parties had agreed to. On April 3, 2006, The Maryland federal district court issued an opinion on the validity of the case.
