= Kennedy High School (Colorado) =

John F. Kennedy High School

Location
- 2855 S. Lamar Street; Denver, Colorado 80227; United States; 39°39′52″N 105°04′02″W

Information
- Type: Public high school
- Motto: "Home of the Commanders"
- Established: 1964 (62 years ago)
- School district: Denver Public Schools
- CEEB code: 060418
- Principal: Victoria Wyatt
- Teaching staff: 49.01 (on FTE basis)
- Grades: 9-12
- Student to teacher ratio: 13.90
- Campus type: Suburban
- Colors: Navy blue and kelly green
- Athletics: 5A
- Athletics conference: Denver League
- Mascot: Commanders
- Educational program: International Baccalaureate
- Website: jfk.dpsk12.org

John F. Kennedy High School (also known as "Kennedy" or "JFK") is a public secondary school located in the Bear Valley neighborhood on the southwest side of Denver, Colorado, United States. The school serves about 1,500 students in grades 9-12 in the Denver Public Schools system.

When the school opened with the spring semester of the 1965 - 1966 school year, it served both grades 7 - 9 and grades 10-12. There was no junior high school in the area, so the new school was designed to accommodate both junior and senior high school students.

In 1974, a court ordered the almost 100% white school, along with the rest of Denver's school system, to begin desegregation busing. A large portion of the former attendance area was assigned to Lincoln High School (without buses) and students from other parts of Denver were assigned to Kennedy (with buses). The court-ordered busing was the start of the great white flight out of the Denver Public School System.

== Demographics ==
- Hispanic 77.4%
- White 10.3%
- African American 2.9%
- Asian 7%
- Multiple 1.4%
- Native American <1%

80.1% of Kennedy students are eligible for a free/reduced lunch rate.

== International Baccalaureate program ==
On December 11, 2007 Kennedy became the second high school in Denver to offer the two-year International Baccalaureate program, and is the only school in Denver to offer an authorized IB education for all grade levels.

== Athletics ==
Kennedy offers many after-school sports:

- Fall sports
  - Football
  - Softball
  - Tennis, boys'
  - Volleyball, girls'
  - Cross country, boys' and girls'
  - Boys' soccer
  - Cheerleading
- Winter sports
  - Basketball, boys' and girls'
  - Wrestling, boys' and girls'
  - Cheerleading
- Spring sports
  - Baseball
  - Soccer, girls'
  - Volleyball, boys'
  - Tennis, girls'
  - Track and field
  - Cheerleading

== Teachers honored ==
The National Association of Biology Teachers, in conjunction with Prentice Hall and the Colorado Biology Teachers Association, gave Kevin Lindauer the Outstanding Biology Teacher Award for Colorado for 2008.

== Parent support groups ==
=== Commander Connection ===
The mission of the Commander Connection, also known as the Commander Club, is to act as a support group, to enhance the academic, athletic, social and arts & science activities of the students at John F. Kennedy High School, and to promote school spirit & school pride. The Commander Connection provides volunteer support of student activities. Meetings are held the first Tuesday of each month at 7:00 p.m. in the Community Room at Kennedy High School.

=== KIBPA ===
KIBPA (Kennedy's International Baccalaureate Parent's Association) is the parent support group for IB students and teachers.

== Notable alumni ==
- Greg Jones - former NFL Linebacker
- Tony Laubach - professional storm chaser featured on the Discovery Channel TV series Storm Chasers, National Geographic Channel TV special Into the Tornado, and Women's Entertainment TV series, Twister Sisters
- Gabe Molina - former MLB player (Baltimore Orioles, Atlanta Braves, St. Louis Cardinals)
