= Greg Jones (linebacker, born 1974) =

American football player (born 1974)

No. 54, 55, 51
- Position: Linebacker

Personal information
- Born: May 22, 1974 (age 52); Denver, Colorado, U.S.
- Listed height: 6 ft 4 in (1.93 m)
- Listed weight: 248 lb (112 kg)

Career information
- High school: Denver (CO) Kennedy
- College: Colorado
- NFL draft: 1997: 2nd round, 51st overall pick

Career history
- Washington Redskins (1997–2000); Chicago Bears (2001); Houston Texans (2002)*; Arizona Cardinals (2002)
- * Offseason or practice squad member only

Awards and highlights
- Second-team All-Big Eight (1995)

Career NFL statistics
- Tackles: 121
- Sacks: 6
- Forced fumbles: 2
- Interceptions: 1
- Stats at Pro Football Reference

Greg Phillip Jones (born May 22, 1974) is an American former professional football player who was a linebacker in the National Football League (NFL) for the Washington Redskins, the Chicago Bears, the Arizona Cardinals, and the Houston Texans. He played college football for the Colorado Buffaloes and was selected in the second round of the 1997 NFL draft.

== NFL career statistics ==
Legend
**Bold**	Career high

=== Regular season ===
Year	Team	Games		Tackles				Interceptions				Fumbles			
Year	Team	GP	GS	Comb	Solo	Ast	Sck	Int	Yds	TD	Lng	FF	FR	Yds	TD
1997	WAS	16	3	16	12	4	**3.5**	0	0	0	0	**1**	0	0	0
1998	WAS	16	5	20	18	2	1.0	**1**	**9**	0	**9**	0	0	0	0
1999	WAS	15	15	**46**	**33**	**13**	0.5	0	0	0	0	0	0	0	0
2000	WAS	16	4	14	12	2	1.0	0	0	0	0	0	**1**	0	0
2001	CHI	16	0	20	19	1	0.0	0	0	0	0	**1**	0	0	0
2002	ARI	3	1	5	5	0	0.0	0	0	0	0	0	0	0	0
Career		82	28	121	99	22	6.0	1	9	0	9	2	1	0	0

=== Playoffs ===
Year	Team	Games		Tackles				Interceptions				Fumbles			
Year	Team	GP	GS	Comb	Solo	Ast	Sck	Int	Yds	TD	Lng	FF	FR	Yds	TD
1999	WAS	2	2	**3**	**2**	**1**	**1.0**	0	0	0	0	0	0	0	0
2001	CHI	1	0	2	**2**	0	0.0	0	0	0	0	0	0	0	0
Career		3	2	5	4	1	1.0	0	0	0	0	0	0	0	0
