= Matt Turk =

American football player (born 1968)

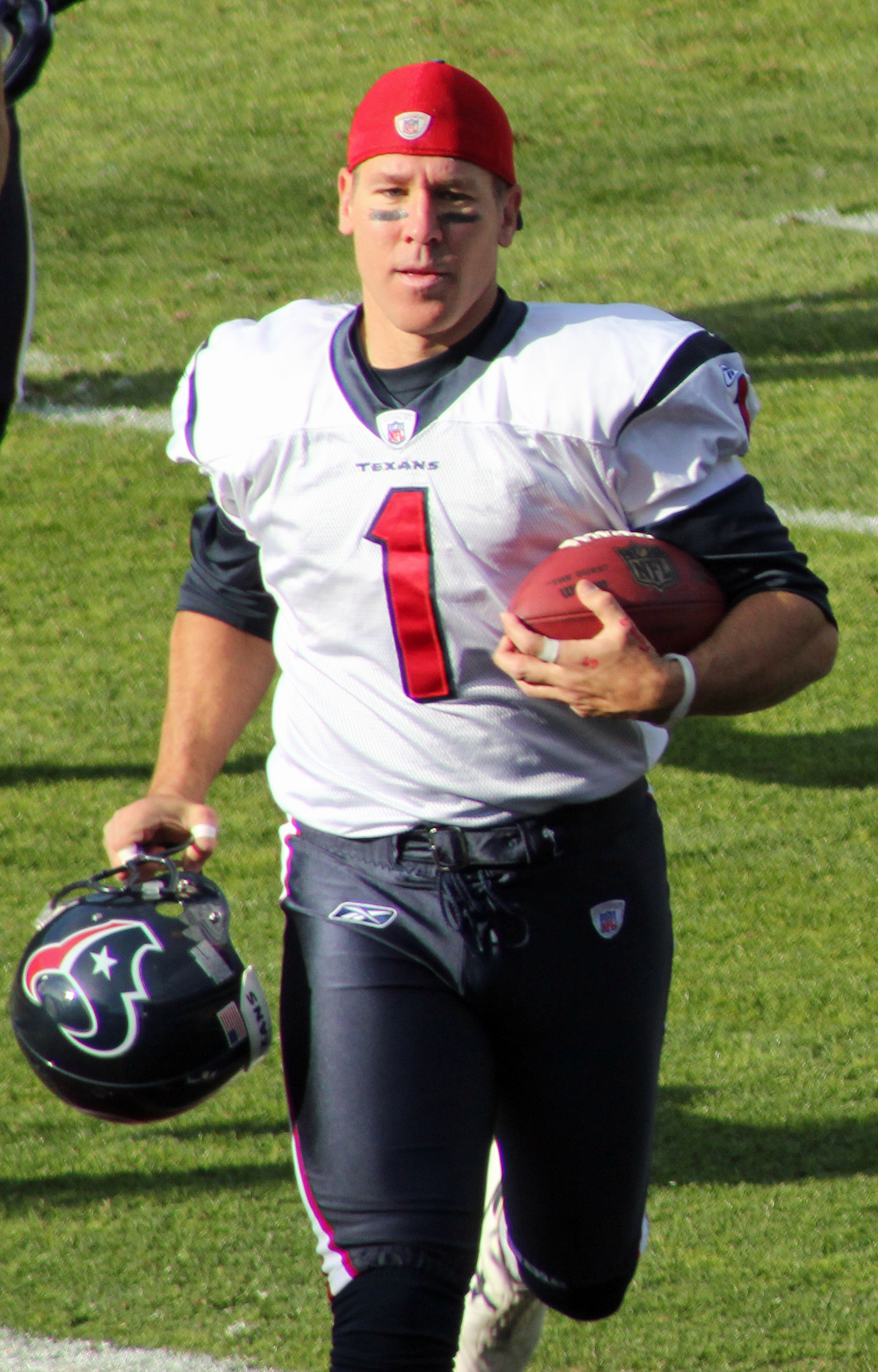
- Turk in 2010

No. 1
- Position: Punter

Personal information
- Born: June 16, 1968 (age 58); Greenfield, Wisconsin, U.S.
- Listed height: 6 ft 5 in (1.96 m)
- Listed weight: 251 lb (114 kg)

Career information
- High school: Greenfield
- College: UW–Whitewater (1988–1990)
- NFL draft: 1993: undrafted

Career history
- Racine Raiders (1993); Green Bay Packers (1993)*; Los Angeles Rams (1994)*; Washington Redskins (1995–1999); Miami Dolphins (2000–2001); New York Jets (2002); Miami Dolphins (2003–2005); St. Louis Rams (2006); Houston Texans (2007–2010); Jacksonville Jaguars (2011); Houston Texans (2011)
- * Offseason or practice squad member only

Awards and highlights
- First-team All-Pro (1996); 3× Pro Bowl (1996–1998)

Career NFL statistics
- Punts: 1,143
- Punting yards: 48,414
- Punting average: 42.8
- Stats at Pro Football Reference

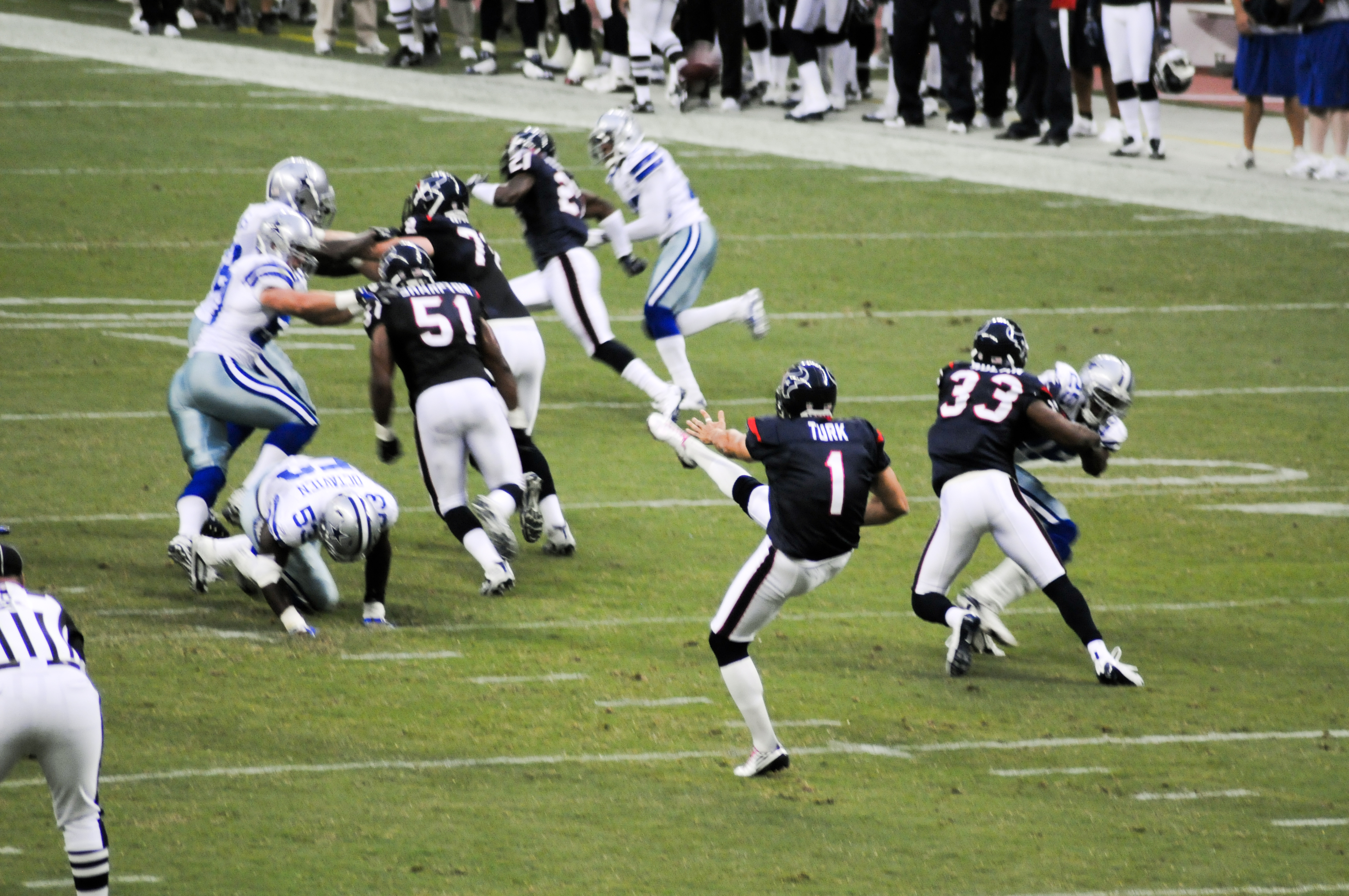
Turk punting in 2010

Matthew Edward Turk (born June 16, 1968) is an American former professional football player who was a punter in the National Football League (NFL). He was originally signed by the Green Bay Packers as an undrafted free agent in 1993. He played college football at the University of Wisconsin–Whitewater. A three-time Pro Bowl selection, Turk was also a member of the Los Angeles Rams, Washington Redskins, Miami Dolphins, New York Jets, St. Louis Rams, Jacksonville Jaguars, and Houston Texans. He is the 2nd tallest punter in NFL history (tied with 2 others).

== Early life ==
Turk graduated from Greenfield High School in his birthplace of Greenfield, Wisconsin in 1986.

Matt played college football for the University of Wisconsin–Whitewater and graduated with a degree in elementary education in 1993. With the Wisconsin–Whitewater Warhawks, Turk averaged 36.3 yards per punt. The Warhawks won the Wisconsin State University Conference Championship in 1990 season. Turk also played the tight end position at UWW.

== Professional career ==
Turk played semi-pro football for the Racine Raiders before entering the NFL. He signed with the Green Bay Packers and Los Angeles Rams in 1993 and 1994 respectively, but did not make the final roster on either team.

=== Washington Redskins ===
On April 5, 1995, the Washington Redskins signed Turk, and for the first time in his career, he made an NFL roster. In 1996 he was named a First Team All-Pro, the last time a Washington player of any position has received that honor until guard Brandon Scherff was honored in 2021. He stayed on the team until they traded Turk to the Miami Dolphins on March 9, 2000. He was traded because of a strained relationship with owner Dan Snyder over a finger injury he had that caused him to miss a game. He also was upset because there was a report that he got injured in a basketball game (although that was later proven false after it was discovered that he was misdiagnosed.) Turk said he "wasn't surprised" and the Redskins "did him a favor" by trading him.

=== Miami Dolphins ===
Turk played for the Dolphins for 2 seasons (2000–2001).

=== New York Jets ===
On April 23, 2002, Turk signed with the New York Jets. On March 7, he was released.

=== Return to Dolphins ===
After a poor performance by Mark Royals, Turk was re-signed by the Dolphins on September 29, 2003. After having a visit with the Green Bay Packers (the first team he signed with his career), he ultimately re-signed with the Dolphins on March 23, 2004. After being placed on Injured Reserve, he was released on October 12, 2005.

=== Return to Rams ===
On April 4, 2006, Turk and the St. Louis Rams agreed to a 1-year deal 12 years after he signed with the team.

=== Houston Texans ===
The Houston Texans signed Matt Turk late in the 2007 offseason to compete with incumbent punter Chad Stanley. He won the job after Chad Stanley was cut on August 31, 2007 After ranking 2nd in punts inside the 20, he was re-signed for a 2-year, 3.5 million dollar contract on March 19, 2008, the first day he was eligible to sign a free agent contract. On March 9, 2010, his agent David Canter announced he signed a 1-year contract to return to the Texans. He was not re-signed in 2011.

=== Jacksonville Jaguars ===
On July 28, 2011, Turk signed a contract with the Jacksonville Jaguars. He was released October 11 after a terrible game against the Bengals. The fans booed him and he was waving his hands as if he wanted to be booed more.

=== Return to Texans ===
After Brett Hartmann was placed on IR, the Texans re-signed Matt Turk. He said it was a "dream come true" to return to the team.

== NFL career statistics ==
Legend
| | Led the league |
| **Bold** | Career high |

=== Regular season ===
| Year | Team | GP | Punting | | | | |
| Year | Team | GP | Punts | Yds | Avg | Lng | Blk |
|---|---|---|---|---|---|---|---|
| 1995 | WAS | **16** | 74 | 3,140 | 42.4 | 60 | 0 |
| 1996 | WAS | **16** | 75 | 3,386 | **45.1** | 63 | 0 |
| 1997 | WAS | **16** | 84 | 3,788 | **45.1** | 62 | **1** |
| 1998 | WAS | **16** | 93 | **4,103** | 44.1 | 69 | **1** |
| 1999 | WAS | 14 | 62 | 2,564 | 41.4 | 57 | 0 |
| 2000 | MIA | **16** | 92 | 3,870 | 42.1 | 70 | 0 |
| 2001 | MIA | **16** | 81 | 3,321 | 41.0 | **77** | 0 |
| 2002 | NYJ | **16** | 63 | 2,584 | 41.0 | 65 | 0 |
| 2003 | MIA | 13 | 68 | 2,631 | 38.7 | 57 | 0 |
| 2004 | MIA | **16** | **98** | 4,088 | 41.7 | 67 | 0 |
| 2005 | MIA | 0 | Did not play due to injury | | | | |
| 2006 | STL | **16** | 72 | 3,132 | 43.5 | 74 | **1** |
| 2007 | HOU | **16** | 55 | 2,296 | 41.7 | 59 | 0 |
| 2008 | HOU | **16** | 53 | 2,240 | 42.3 | 59 | 0 |
| 2009 | HOU | **16** | 67 | 2,866 | 42.8 | 62 | 0 |
| 2010 | HOU | **16** | 63 | 2,650 | 42.1 | 60 | 0 |
| 2011 | JAX | 5 | 27 | 1,072 | 39.7 | 65 | 0 |
| 2011 | HOU | 4 | 16 | 683 | 42.7 | 55 | 0 |
| Career | | 244 | 1,143 | 48,414 | 42.4 | 77 | 3 |

=== Postseason ===
| Year | Team | GP | Punting | | | | |
| Year | Team | GP | Punts | Yds | Avg | Lng | Blk |
|---|---|---|---|---|---|---|---|
| 1999 | WAS | **2** | **12** | **499** | 41.6 | 52 | 0 |
| 2000 | MIA | **2** | 9 | 343 | 38.1 | 51 | 0 |
| 2001 | MIA | 1 | 5 | 237 | **47.4** | 52 | 0 |
| 2002 | NYJ | **2** | 4 | 137 | 34.3 | 39 | 0 |
| 2011 | HOU | **2** | 10 | 451 | 45.1 | **56** | 0 |
| Career | | 9 | 40 | 1,667 | 41.7 | 56 | 0 |

== Personal life ==
Turk currently lives in Houston, Texas. He has a wife, Stephanie, and his three daughters.

The youngest of six brothers, Matt Turk had a brother who also played in the NFL, Dan Turk, who was a center for 15 seasons; Dan died on December 24, 2000. In his last season, Dan was the long snapper for one of Matt's punts, to become the first brothers to do so.

His nephew, Ben Turk, was the starting punter for the University of Notre Dame for the 2010, 2011, and 2012 seasons. Ben Turk worked out for the Texans' rookie mini camp in the 2013 off season, but didn't sign. Another of Matt's nephews, Michael Turk was a punter for Arizona State, and transferred to Oklahoma in 2021. In April 2023, after going undrafted Michael Turk was signed by one of his uncles former teams, the Miami Dolphins before getting cut.
