= Brad Johnson (American football) =

American football player (born 1968)

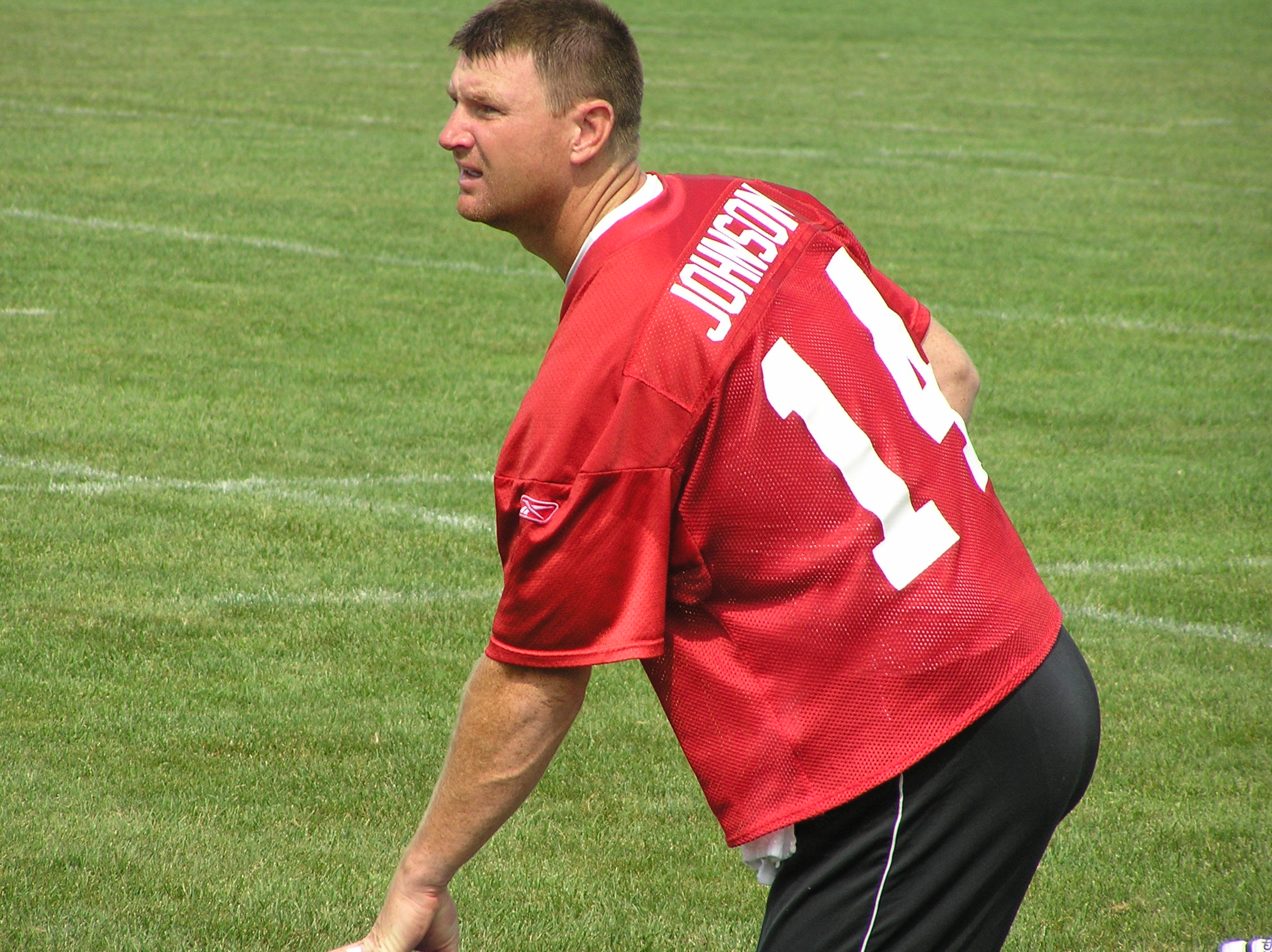
- Johnson with the Minnesota Vikings in 2005

No. 14
- Position: Quarterback

Personal information
- Born: September 13, 1968 (age 58); Marietta, Georgia, U.S.
- Listed height: 6 ft 5 in (1.96 m)
- Listed weight: 235 lb (107 kg)

Career information
- High school: Charles D. Owen (Black Mountain, North Carolina)
- College: Florida State (1988–1991)
- NFL draft: 1992: 9th round, 227th overall pick

Career history
- Minnesota Vikings (1992–1998); → London Monarchs (1995); Washington Redskins (1999–2000); Tampa Bay Buccaneers (2001–2004); Minnesota Vikings (2005–2006); Dallas Cowboys (2007–2008)

Awards and highlights
- Super Bowl champion (XXXVII); 2× Pro Bowl (1999, 2002)

Career NFL statistics
- Passing attempts: 4,326
- Passing completions: 2,668
- Completion percentage: 61.7%
- TD–INT: 166–122
- Passing yards: 29,054
- Passer rating: 82.5
- Rushing yards: 657
- Rushing touchdowns: 8
- Stats at Pro Football Reference

James Bradley Johnson (born September 13, 1968) is an American former professional football quarterback who played in the National Football League (NFL) for 17 seasons with the Minnesota Vikings, Washington Redskins, Tampa Bay Buccaneers, and Dallas Cowboys. He is best known for his time with the Buccaneers, whom he led to a win in Super Bowl XXXVII.

Johnson played college football for the Florida State Seminoles and was selected in the ninth round of the 1992 NFL draft. He is also notable for being the first player in the NFL to complete a touchdown pass to himself, doing so in a 1997 game against the Carolina Panthers. He remained the only player to do so until Marcus Mariota repeated the feat in a 2018 postseason game.

== Early life and college ==
Born in Marietta, Georgia, Brad Johnson attended Charles D. Owen High School in Black Mountain, North Carolina. At Owen High School, Johnson played football and basketball; he received All-American honors as quarterback on the football team and all-state honors as a member of the basketball team.

After graduating from Owen High School in 1987, Johnson attended Florida State University. From 1987 to 1989, Johnson played on the Florida State Seminoles men's basketball team and started 11 games as a freshman. In 1988, Johnson joined the football team (under coach Bobby Bowden) at Florida State as a redshirt freshman and served as holder in every game and played two games as quarterback.

In 1989 as a sophomore, Johnson was third-string quarterback behind Peter Tom Willis and Casey Weldon; Johnson completed 7 of 12 passes for 67 yards. Johnson won the 1990 Fiesta Bowl title with the Seminoles. As a junior in 1990, Johnson started the first six games of the season before being replaced by Weldon. With a 4–2 record starting those games, Johnson finished the 1990 season with 109-for-163 passing for a career-high 1,136 yards with 8 touchdowns and 5 interceptions. For the third consecutive season with Johnson, Florida State won a bowl game, the Blockbuster Bowl. Johnson would play nine games (with one start – a win) as a senior in 1991. On 37-for-61 passing for 462 yards, Johnson passed for 5 touchdowns and 3 interceptions, and Florida State won the Cotton Bowl Classic in 1992.

== Professional career ==
Pre-draft measurables
Height	Weight	Arm length	Hand span	40-yard dash	10-yard split	20-yard split	20-yard shuttle	Vertical jump
6 ft 4 1/2 in (1.94 m)	218 lb (99 kg)	31 in (0.79 m)	10 1/8 in (0.26 m)	5.02 s	1.70 s	2.87 s	4.29 s	29.5 in (0.75 m)
All values from NFL Combine

=== First stint with Minnesota Vikings (1992–1998) ===
==== 1992–1993 ====
In the 1992 NFL draft, the Minnesota Vikings drafted Johnson in the ninth round as the 227th overall pick. As third-string quarterback behind starter Rich Gannon and backup Sean Salisbury, Johnson dressed for only one game as a rookie in 1992 but did not play. In 1993, Johnson continued to be the third-string quarterback for the first 10 games of the season and was inactive for the final six.

==== 1994 season ====
In 1994, Johnson became backup to starter Warren Moon and played his first NFL regular season game in Week 3 (September 18). The Vikings won 42–14 over the Chicago Bears in that game, and Johnson completed 3 of 3 passes for 16 yards. Johnson would play in three more games in 1994. In Week 8 (October 30), a 36–13 win over the Tampa Bay Buccaneers, Johnson completed 5 of 5 passes for 30 yards. Johnson had his first significant playing time in Week 15 (December 17), a 41–19 loss to the Detroit Lions. In that game, Johnson completed 14 of 29 passes for 104 yards.

==== 1995 season ====
In the spring of 1995, Johnson joined the London Monarchs of the World League, an American football league based in Europe. With London, Johnson completed 194 of 328 passes for 2,227 yards, 13 touchdowns, and 14 interceptions. Johnson had the most completions of all World League quarterbacks in 1995. For his season with the Monarchs, Johnson earned £12,000. Back with the Minnesota Vikings in 1995, Johnson played five games that season. In a 44–24 victory over the Pittsburgh Steelers in Week 4 (September 24), Johnson completed one 36-yard pass. However, Minnesota lost 38–21 to the Green Bay Packers in Week 7 (October 22), a game in which Johnson completed 10 of 17 passes for 94 yards and one interception. In that game, Johnson also rushed once for 3 yards. In Week 11 (November 19), Johnson completed 5 of 7 passes for 70 yards in the Vikings' 43–24 win over the New Orleans Saints. Johnson had 9-for-11 passing for 72 yards but one interception in Week 14 (December 9), and Minnesota defeated the Cleveland Browns 27–11.

==== 1996 season ====
Johnson started eight of twelve games in 1996. Twice, Johnson earned NFC Offensive Player of the Week honors, and he finished third in the NFC with an 89.4 passer rating. In the season opener against the Detroit Lions on September 1, Johnson played in the second half after starter Warren Moon suffered an ankle injury amid 5-for-14 passing. With 1:06 remaining in the fourth quarter, Johnson threw his first career touchdown pass, a 31-yard pass to Cris Carter that would clinch the 17–13 victory for Minnesota. Overall that game, Johnson completed 16 of 23 passes for 157 yards and rushed three times for 14 yards. Johnson started his first game of his career the following week on September 8 and led Minnesota to a 23–17 road win over the Atlanta Falcons. This victory marked the first time Minnesota started 2–0 since 1987. With 15-for-26 passing for 275 yards, Johnson threw for two touchdowns and one interception. Warren Moon would return as starter the following week. Johnson played again in Week 4 with one incomplete pass and saw significant playing time next in Week 8 (October 28), a 15–13 loss to the Chicago Bears. Again replacing an injured Warren Moon, Johnson completed 10 of 15 passes for 79 yards. In the final play of the game, Bryan Cox forced a fumble from Johnson. This was Johnson's only lost fumble of Johnson's five fumbles in 1996.

Johnson started the next game in Week 9 (November 3), and the Vikings lost to the Kansas City Chiefs 21–6. With 22-for-42 passing, Johnson passed for 218 yards, 1 touchdown, and 2 interceptions and rushed three times for 12 yards. In a backup role in Week 10 (November 10), a 42–23 loss to the Seattle Seahawks, Johnson completed 8 of 12 passes for 123 yards and 1 touchdown and ran twice for 3 yards. Starting Week 11 (November 17), Johnson became the regular starter for the Vikings after Moon was again injured. Johnson led Minnesota to a 4–2 record to end the season. With a Week 15 (December 15) victory over the Tampa Bay Buccaneers 21–10, Minnesota clinched a playoff berth for the season. Johnson clinched the win for Minnesota with a 36-yard touchdown pass to Cris Carter, part of a 99-yard drive. Minnesota finished the regular season 9–7, second place in the NFC Central. Johnson made his postseason debut in the Vikings' NFC Wild Card game against the defending Super Bowl champion Dallas Cowboys on December 28, 1996. Minnesota lost to Dallas 40–15, as Johnson completed 15 of 27 passes for 208 yards, 1 touchdown, and 2 interceptions and rushed 14 yards on three carries for one touchdown.

==== 1997 season ====
Starting the first 12 games of 1997, Johnson led Minnesota to an 8–4 record, including a six-game winning streak from September 28 (Week 5) to November 9 (Week 10), before suffering a season-ending neck injury in Week 13. By Week 6, Johnson set a team record with 15 straight games with a touchdown pass. Johnson also had no interceptions in 109 consecutive passes in four consecutive games from October 12 to November 9. In the Vikings' 21–14 win over the Carolina Panthers on October 12 (Week 7), Johnson caught his own deflected pass and ran 3 yards for a touchdown. Johnson became the first player to complete a pass to himself for a touchdown in NFL history. This play won the ESPY award for NFL Play of the Year. In three games, Johnson led the Vikings to fourth-quarter comeback wins. Johnson finished 1997 fourth in the NFC with 20 touchdown passes and 3,036 passing yards.

On the morning of the Week 13 Monday Night Football game, Johnson woke up with a sore neck and saw a chiropractor to be cleared to play. After Johnson passed only 15-for-30 for 117 yards and one interception and was sacked six times, coach Dennis Green benched Johnson and put in Randall Cunningham. The Vikings would lose to the Green Bay Packers 27–11. Cunningham would start the final three games of the season, and Minnesota finished the 1997 season 9–7, won the NFC Wild Card game, and lost the NFC Divisional round.

==== 1998 season ====
Johnson started the first two games of 1998 for the Vikings, both victories. In the season opener, a 31–7 win over Tampa Bay, Johnson threw for 4 touchdowns and 1 interception over 189 yards and completed 15 of 25 passes. However, Johnson would complete only 18 of 31 passes the following game and throw for 1 touchdown and 2 interceptions before leaving the game during the fourth quarter with a sprained ankle. Randall Cunningham replaced Johnson, and Minnesota won Week 2 (September 13) over the St. Louis Rams 38–31. By Week 8, with Cunningham as starter, the Vikings had a perfect 7–0 record. Johnson returned to action in Week 9 (November 8), in a 31–24 win over the New Orleans Saints, after Cunningham injured his knee. With 28-for-38 passing over 316 yards, Johnson had one passing touchdown and 2 interceptions. However, Johnson broke his thumb on the first play of the third quarter. Cunningham returned as starter the following week, and Johnson next played in the Week 15 50–10 win over the Jacksonville Jaguars. Minnesota finished the 1998 season a franchise-best 15–1 and advanced to the NFC championship game, where they came a field goal short of the Super Bowl against the Atlanta Falcons. Following the season, Vikings coach Dennis Green formally named Randall Cunningham as starting quarterback and traded Brad Johnson to the Washington Redskins for a first, a future second, and a third-round draft pick.

=== Washington Redskins (1999–2000) ===
==== 1999 season ====
With 4,005 yards, 24 touchdowns, 13 interceptions, and a 90.0 passer rating, Johnson achieved career highs in passing yards, completions, touchdowns, and passer rating in 1999. His 316 completions set a Washington team record and his 4,005 passing yards ranks fifth all-time in Redskins history. He was also NFC Offensive Player of the Week twice that year again. One such Player of the Week honor came after Week 4 (October 3) after Johnson rallied the Redskins to a 38–36 win over the Carolina Panthers; the Panthers led 21–0 during the game.

Johnson made the NFC squad of the 2000 Pro Bowl, his first career Pro Bowl appearance.

==== 2000 season ====
The following year in 2000 saw Washington sign Jeff George to a four year deal to backup Johnson.

Johnson threw more interceptions (15) than touchdowns (11) in a season that saw him start the first nine games of the season and go 6–3 before he tore a ligament in his knee that saw Jeff George start the next three games. Johnson stopped negotiations for a contract extension by October. The Redskins skidded down the stretch, which saw Norv Turner fired for Terry Robiskie when the team fell to 7–6. In the game Johnson returned, he was benched midway through a 9-7 loss to the Giants (where he was just 14-of-29 passes for 126 yards with two interceptions) for George, who started the next two games due to apparent orders from owner Daniel Snyder. Johnson started the last game of the season, which saw the team finish with a 8–8 record.

Johnson signed with Tampa Bay as a free agent during the offseason while George started in Washington for 2001. George would go on to have the worst stats in the league and was released for Tony Banks after the second game with a 0–2 start, while Johnson had a strong season in Tampa Bay and won a Super Bowl the following year.

=== Tampa Bay and the Super Bowl (2001–2004) ===
In 2001, Johnson was pursued by the Baltimore Ravens in the offseason (coached by Brian Billick, his former offensive coordinator with the Vikings), but he spurned them to join the Buccaneers on a five-year contract worth $28 million. Johnson was reunited with former Vikings assistant-coach Tony Dungy for his first season with the Tampa Bay Buccaneers. That year, he broke the Buccaneers team records for passing yards with 3,406, completions with 340, and attempts with 540. In the 2002 season, he led the Buccaneers to their first Super Bowl championship and earned his second Pro Bowl appearance. He was helped in the Super Bowl by a defense that scored 21 of their 48 points. That year, Johnson also became the first Buccaneers QB to lead the NFC in passer rating at 92.9 and set new team records for passing touchdowns with 22, completion percentage with 62.3, consecutive passes without an interception with 187 and lowest interception percentage with 1.3%. He was NFC Offensive Player of the Week twice.

On January 21, 2015, Johnson later admitted to bribing ball boys to alter the footballs used during the Super Bowl. According to Johnson: "I paid some guys off to get the balls right. I went and got all 100 footballs, and they took care of all of them." He also stated that he "did nothing wrong", and that he talked to opposing Oakland Raiders quarterback Rich Gannon beforehand and both agreed that they preferred not to use the slick, brand-new balls that the league provided for the game.

In 2003, he won the NFL's "Quarterback Challenge" competition, in which he beat Pro Bowl QBs Tom Brady, Matt Hasselbeck, Jeff Garcia, Mark Brunell, Marc Bulger and others like Byron Leftwich and Joey Harrington in a skills competition with four parts involving accuracy, speed and mobility, long distance throw, and "No Huddle." Former teammate Sean Salisbury said that despite having a big, strong arm and a great deep ball, Johnson would tend to throw the fast and easy completion which earned him the nickname "Checkdown Charlie" among friends.

After the Super Bowl, the Buccaneers ran into some problems. Although Johnson had good passing stats in 2003–2004 the year after the Super Bowl (3,811 yards, 26 touchdowns to break the Buccaneers' record again, 21 interceptions, and named 2003 Buccaneers MVP by the Tampa Sports Club) and 2004 (63% completion rate), they benched him in the fourth game of the 2004 season because the team had gone 4–11 in the last 15 games Johnson started. When the backup quarterback Chris Simms was injured they started third-string quarterback Brian Griese instead of Johnson partly because of salary cap problems. Johnson asked out and was cut from the team at the end of the season.

=== Back in Minnesota (2005–2006) ===
In 2005, Minnesota was struggling with now three-time Pro Bowler Daunte Culpepper starting at quarterback. Randy Moss had been traded in March of that year, and four-time Pro Bowl Center Matt Birk was injured so Culpepper was expected to carry the offense against the top defenses in the NFL. While playing without any offensive weapons, and falling behind early in games the Vikings began the season at 2–5 with Culpepper throwing twice as many interceptions – twelve – as touchdowns – six – and five fumbles (three lost) before tearing his MCL, ACL, and PCL in the seventh game.

Johnson then took over as starting quarterback and the team then finished the season 7–2 with a six-game winning streak needing only one more win to go to the playoffs. Brad played very well and set a team record for lowest interception to attempt ratio (1.3% – same as his record in Tampa) which was the lowest in the NFL among starting QBs. While starting against teams that included the second (Bears), fourth (Ravens), fifth (Steelers), and seventh (Packers) ranked defenses in the NFL his passer rating was the third best in the NFC among starting quarterbacks, and was also better than three QBs selected to the Pro Bowl. But he struggled in those particular games with the exception of the Bears game in which the Bears had already clinched the division and played all of their 2nd and 3rd stringers. He also scored more touchdowns per game than four selected to the Pro Bowl. And despite his age he threw just as many 40+ yard passes as top 29 yr old QB Peyton Manning – six – in seven fewer games, which was the same amount as his Super Bowl year which had four more games.

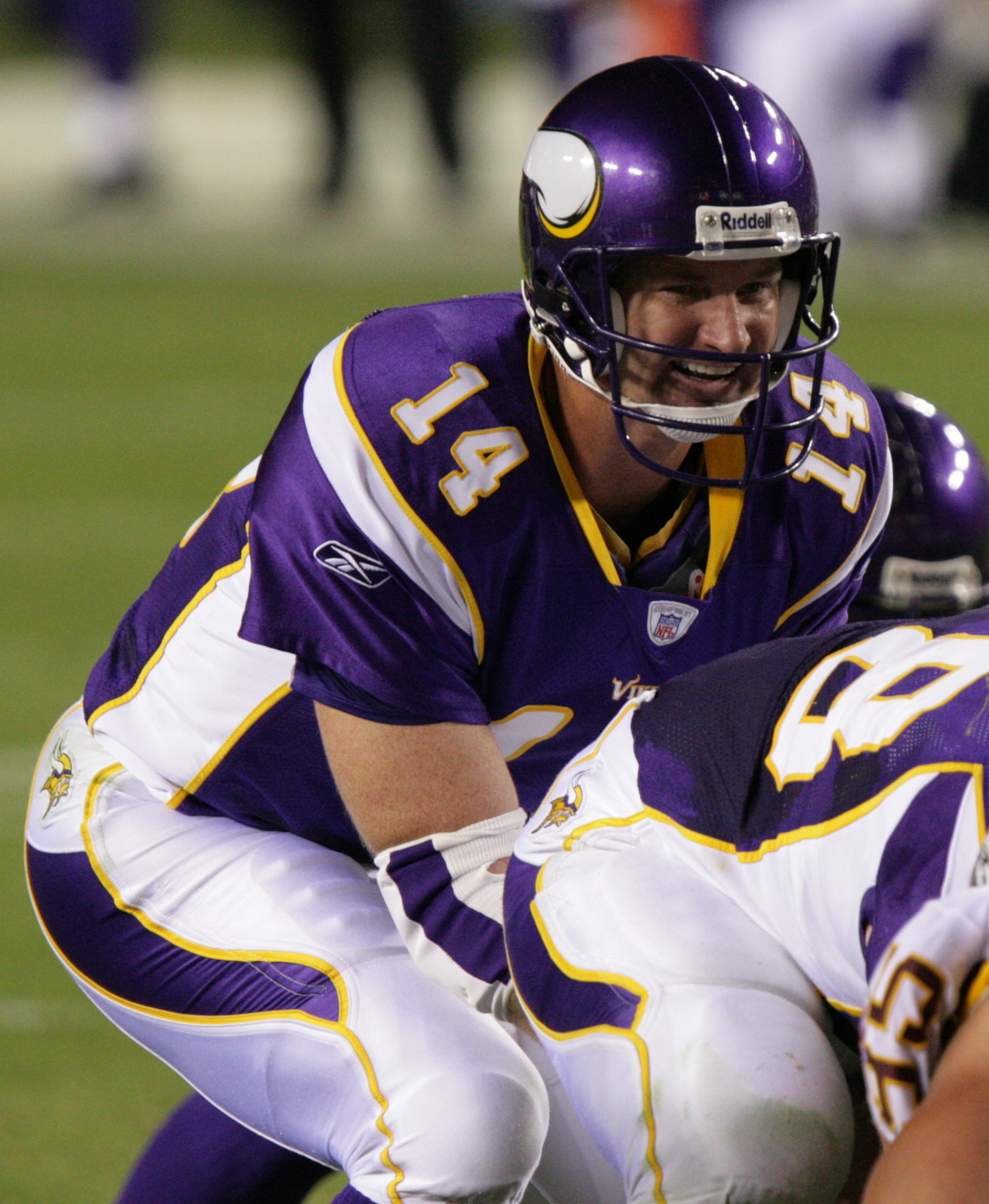
Johnson with the Vikings in 2006

Johnson was named the starting quarterback for the Vikings' 2006 season, and a few days before the second game he turned 38 which made him the oldest starting quarterback in the league. Many felt his quick-release style was a good fit for then-new coach Brad Childress' highly touted West Coast system. The knowledge he had acquired from going to the playoffs under four different coaching systems and having winning records with seven different head coaches seemed to be an asset for first time head coach Childress. In the preseason, Johnson had a passer rating of 110.7, one of the top 10 in the league out of more than 100 quarterbacks who performed.

However, in the regular season, Johnson struggled more than Daunte Culpepper did in 2005, throwing eight touchdowns to fifteen interceptions. Midway through the season, he had already set an NFL record for passes completed short of a first down on third down in a season. Many fans grew restless for the benching of Johnson because of his conservative checkdowns, immobility, and at the same time reckless decisions which plagued the Vikings offense. His quarterback-rating on 3rd downs, with a lead, from behind, and in the red zone were the worst in the entire league. 31 QBs threw more touchdown passes while only 10 threw more interceptions than Johnson in the 2006 NFL season.

On February 28, 2007, the Vikings released Johnson in favor of rookie quarterback Tarvaris Jackson.

=== Dallas Cowboys (2007–2008) ===
On March 5, 2007, Johnson signed a three-year deal with the Dallas Cowboys to back up Tony Romo. Johnson played little in the 2007 season. He played in week 17 against the Washington Redskins, going 7-for-11 for 79 yards in the 27–6 loss.

During the 2008 season, Romo suffered a broken pinkie finger on his throwing hand in week 6 against the Arizona Cardinals. Johnson started for the Cowboys during the next three weeks until the injury healed. In Johnson's week 7 start against the St. Louis Rams, he completed 17 of 34 passes for 234 yards with one touchdown and three interceptions. He also had one fumble in the 34–14 loss. In week 8, in a 13–9 win against the Tampa Bay Buccaneers, he passed for 122 yards and one touchdown to Roy Williams, and the Cowboys had the lowest total offensive yards in a winning game: 172 yards. In the week 9 game against the New York Giants, he completed 5 of 11 passes for 71 yards and had two passes intercepted. He was replaced by third-string quarterback Brooks Bollinger at the start of the second half. After the Cowboys' bye week, Romo returned from the broken finger to reclaim the starting role.

The Cowboys released Johnson on February 26, 2009.

=== Legacy ===
Johnson ranks 63rd in career passer rating in NFL history as of January 2022, above Troy Aikman and Warren Moon, who are 71st and 77th, respectively. Johnson went 72–53 as a starter and completed over 60% of his passes for 13 straight seasons (1995–2007), the first quarterback in NFL history to do so.

Johnson eclipsed the 3,000-yard passing mark five times. In 1999, he became only the second Washington Redskins quarterback in franchise history to eclipse 4,000 yards. He had the top passer rating in the NFC in 2002, the same season he helped the Tampa Bay Buccaneers win Super Bowl XXXVII, and would earn NFC Offensive Player of the Week honors seven times in his career. He would also break many Tampa Bay passing records during his time there as quarterback.

To date, Johnson, Marcus Mariota, and Josh Allen are the only NFL quarterbacks to have thrown touchdown passes to themselves (Mariota doing it in the 2018 NFL playoffs and Allen doing it in Week 13 of the 2024 NFL season). Johnson accomplished this against the Carolina Panthers in 1997, catching his own deflected pass, juking, and running three yards for a touchdown.

== NFL career statistics ==
Legend
	Won the Super Bowl
**Bold**	Career high

=== Regular season ===
Year	Team	Games			Passing								Rushing			
Year	Team	GP	GS	Record	Cmp	Att	Pct	Yds	Avg	TD	Int	Rtg	Att	Yds	Avg	TD
1994	MIN	4	0	—	22	37	59.5	150	4.1	0	0	68.5	2	−2	−1.0	0
1995	MIN	5	0	—	25	36	**69.4**	272	7.6	0	2	68.3	9	−9	−1.0	0
1996	MIN	12	8	5–3	195	311	62.7	2,258	7.3	17	10	89.4	34	90	2.6	1
1997	MIN	13	13	8–5	275	452	60.8	3,036	6.7	20	12	84.5	35	**139**	4.0	0
1998	MIN	4	2	2–0	65	101	64.4	747	7.4	7	5	89.0	12	15	1.3	0
1999	WAS	16	16	10–6	316	519	60.9	**4,005**	**7.7**	24	13	90.0	26	31	1.2	2
2000	WAS	12	11	7–4	227	364	62.4	2,505	6.9	11	15	75.7	22	58	2.6	1
2001	TB	16	16	9–7	340	559	60.8	3,406	6.1	13	11	77.7	**39**	120	3.1	**3**
2002	TB	13	13	**10–3**	281	451	62.3	3,049	6.8	22	6	**92.9**	13	30	2.3	0
2003	TB	16	16	7–9	**354**	**570**	62.1	3,811	6.7	**26**	**21**	81.5	25	33	1.3	0
2004	TB	4	4	0–4	65	103	63.1	674	6.5	3	3	79.5	5	23	**4.6**	0
2005	MIN	15	9	7–2	184	294	62.6	1,885	6.4	12	4	88.9	18	53	2.9	0
2006	MIN	15	14	6–8	270	439	61.5	2,750	6.3	9	15	72.0	29	82	2.8	1
2007	DAL	16	0	—	7	11	63.6	79	7.2	0	0	85.0	5	−5	−1.0	0
2008	DAL	16	3	1–2	41	78	52.6	427	5.5	2	5	50.5	2	−1	−0.5	0
Total		177	125	72–53	2,668	4,326	61.7	29,054	6.7	166	122	82.5	276	657	2.4	8

=== Postseason ===
Year	Team	Games			Passing								Rushing			
Year	Team	GP	GS	Record	Cmp	Att	Pct	Yds	Avg	TD	Int	Rtg	Att	Yds	Avg	TD
1996	MIN	1	1	0–1	15	27	55.6	208	**7.7**	1	2	62.0	3	**14**	**4.7**	**1**
1999	WAS	2	2	1–1	35	63	55.6	323	5.1	1	3	55.2	1	0	0.0	0
2001	TB	1	1	0–1	22	36	**61.1**	202	5.6	0	**4**	36.8	1	2	2.0	0
2002	TB	3	3	**3–0**	**53**	**98**	54.1	**670**	6.8	**5**	3	**79.9**	**8**	13	1.6	0
Total		7	7	4–3	125	224	55.8	1,403	6.3	7	12	62.8	13	29	2.2	1

== Personal life ==
Johnson has two sons, Max and Jake, with his wife, Nikki. His brother-in-law is Mark Richt, former head football coach at the University of Georgia and the University of Miami. Johnson's father is Rick Johnson, who helped establish the Winshape Camps after working several years at Ridgecrest Camps. He currently resides in Athens, Georgia.

He occasionally participates in competitive Pop-A-Shot.
