= Stephen Davis (American football) =

American football player (born 1974)

No. 48
- Position: Running back

Personal information
- Born: March 1, 1974 (age 52); Spartanburg, South Carolina, U.S.
- Listed height: 6 ft 0 in (1.83 m)
- Listed weight: 230 lb (104 kg)

Career information
- High school: Spartanburg
- College: Auburn (1992–1995)
- NFL draft: 1996: 4th round, 102nd overall pick

Career history
- Washington Redskins (1996–2002); Carolina Panthers (2003–2005); St. Louis Rams (2006)

Awards and highlights
- Second-team All-Pro (1999); 3× Pro Bowl (1999, 2000, 2003); NFL rushing touchdowns leader (1999); Washington Commanders 90 Greatest; First-team All-SEC (1994)

Career NFL statistics
- Rushing yards: 8,052
- Rushing average: 4.1
- Rushing touchdowns: 65
- Receptions: 179
- Receiving yards: 1,494
- Receiving touchdowns: 4
- Stats at Pro Football Reference

Stephen Lamont Davis (born March 1, 1974) is an American former professional football player who was a running back for 11 seasons in the National Football League (NFL).

== Early life ==
A native of Spartanburg, South Carolina, Davis attended Spartanburg High School, where he excelled in football and track. At the 1991 South Carolina state meet, he set a state record in the 100 metres with 10.40 seconds. His record stood for 17 years, until Marcus Rowland ran a 10.35 at the 2008 state meet.

Regarded as the No. 1 recruit in the nation in 1992, Davis was named USA Today Offensive High School Football Player of the Year.

== College career ==
Davis played three years (1993, 1994, 1995) for Auburn University, starting in his sophomore year. He made the All-SEC team his last two seasons and graduated as the team's fourth all-time leading rusher behind Joe Cribbs, James Brooks, and Bo Jackson. He was also a letterman for all three seasons.

Davis currently holds the record for rush attempts (1,945), rush yards (8,052) and rushing TDs (65) amongst all Auburn alumni in NFL history.

== Professional career ==
=== Washington Redskins ===
Davis was drafted in the fourth round (103rd overall) in the 1996 NFL draft by the Washington Redskins. Davis was primarily used as a fullback, and was part of the Redskins' backfield with Terry Allen. He spent three seasons as a backup and fullback before getting the starting nod at the start of the 1999 NFL season. This was Davis' breakout season, when he posted career highs, and ended up representing the NFC in the Pro Bowl. In his first three games alone, he had eight rushing touchdowns, which tied Jim Brown for the most in a three-game span to start a season. He led the NFC in yards rushing with 1,405, and led the league in yards per carry (4.8). He was also the league's leading non-kicking scorer, posting 108 points on 17 touchdowns and one two-point conversion. He continued to post high numbers the following season en route to his second straight Pro Bowl selection. In 2001, Davis rushed for 1,432, breaking the record he had set in 1999 for most rushing yards in a season by a Redskin.

Said Football Outsiders about Davis's 1999 season, "Stephen Davis was just a monster in 1999 with 1407 yards (second in the league) and 17 touchdowns (nobody else scored more than 13). He led the league with a 60% success rate, and nobody else with at least 75 carries was over 55%."

=== Carolina Panthers ===
Davis signed with the Carolina Panthers for the start of the 2003 NFL season, and was a catalyst in leading the team to Super Bowl XXXVIII. Davis rushed for a career-high 1,444 rushing yards and eight touchdowns. Davis led all rushers in the postseason with 315 yards. Unfortunately for Davis, he suffered an injury early the following season, and was one of fourteen Panthers on injured reserve as the Panthers struggled to a 7–9 record. He was also on the injured list early in the 2005 season, but came off the bench after a few games before being forced to sit out the remainder of the season with nagging knee injuries. Davis was released by the Panthers on March 1, 2006.

=== St. Louis Rams ===
On August 24, 2006, Davis worked out with the St. Louis Rams and was offered a one-year contract, which he accepted.

=== Retirement ===
On February 27, 2008, Davis signed a one-day contract with Carolina so he could officially retire as a Panther; he did so the next day on February 28, 2008. Later, in 2012, he came forth with reports about suffering from tinnitus and other concussion related side effects.

Davis was the Carolina Panthers' minority coaching intern for the 2010–11 season.

== NFL career statistics ==
Legend
**Bold**	Career high

Year	Team	GP	Rushing						Fumbles	
Year	Team	GP	Att	Yds	Avg	Lng	TD	FD	Fum	Lost
1996	WAS	12	23	139	**6.0**	39	2	7	0	0
1997	WAS	14	141	567	4.0	18	3	31	0	0
1998	WAS	16	34	109	3.2	12	0	6	0	0
1999	WAS	14	290	1,405	4.8	**76**	**17**	**84**	3	1
2000	WAS	15	332	1,318	4.0	50	11	71	3	3
2001	WAS	16	**356**	1,432	4.0	32	5	74	**6**	3
2002	WAS	12	207	820	4.0	33	7	47	4	**4**
2003	CAR	14	318	**1,444**	4.5	40	8	69	3	3
2004	CAR	2	24	92	3.8	12	0	5	0	0
2005	CAR	13	180	549	3.1	39	12	31	2	0
2006	STL	15	40	177	4.4	16	0	10	1	1
Career		143	1,945	8,052	4.1	76	65	435	22	15

=== Carolina Panthers franchise records ===
As of 2017 off-season, Davis held at least 8 Panthers records, including:

- Rush attempts, season (318 in 2003), playoff season (64 in 2003)
- Rush yards, playoff season (315 in 2003)
- Yards per carry, playoff career (4.92)
- Yards per game, career (71.9), season (103.1 in 2003), playoff career (78.8)
- 100+ yard rushing games, season (8 in 2003; with DeAngelo Williams)
