= Kenard Lang =

American football player (born 1975)

North Carolina A&T Aggies
- Title: Defensive line coach

Personal information
- Born: January 31, 1975 (age 51); Orlando, Florida, U.S.
- Listed height: 6 ft 3 in (1.91 m)
- Listed weight: 264 lb (120 kg)

Career information
- Position: Defensive end (No. 76, 90, 96)
- High school: Maynard Evans (Orlando, Florida)
- College: Miami (FL)
- NFL draft: 1997: 1st round, 17th overall pick

Career history

Playing
- Washington Redskins (1997–2001); Cleveland Browns (2002–2005); Denver Broncos (2006)

Coaching
- Jones HS (FL) (2008–2012) Head coach; Wekiva HS (FL) (2013–2015) Head coach; Maynard Evans HS (FL) (2016–2022) Head coach; North Carolina A&T (2023–present) Defensive line coach

Career NFL statistics
- Tackles: 453
- Sacks: 50
- Forced fumbles: 13
- Stats at Pro Football Reference

Kenard Dushun Lang (born January 31, 1975) is an American former professional football player who was a defensive end in the National Football League (NFL). He played for the Cleveland Browns, Washington Redskins, and Denver Broncos.

== Early life ==
Lang attended Maynard Evans High School in Orlando and was a letterman in football, basketball, and baseball.

== College and professional career ==
Lang played college football at the University of Miami. He was part of the 10–1 1994 Hurricanes squad who played in the Orange Bowl.

Lang was selected in the first round with the 17th overall pick in the 1997 NFL draft by The Washington Redskins where he played through the 2001 season. He later signed with The Cleveland Browns.

During the 2005 season, the Browns attempted to convert Lang to linebacker in their new 3–4 scheme under head coach Romeo Crennel. The position change was generally considered to be unsuccessful, however, and Lang was released in February 2006. On March 18, 2006, Lang signed with the Denver Broncos. The Broncos released him on August 27, 2007.

=== NFL statistics ===
Year	Team	Games	Combined tackles	Tackles	Assisted tackles	Sacks	Forced fumbles	Fumble recoveries
1997	WSH	11	34	25	9	1.5	0	2
1998	WSH	16	54	46	8	7.0	2	0
1999	WSH	16	36	33	3	6.0	3	1
2000	WSH	16	16	16	0	3.0	1	1
2001	WSH	16	65	50	15	4.0	3	2
2002	CLE	15	45	32	13	5.5	2	0
2003	CLE	15	60	46	14	8.0	1	1
2004	CLE	16	62	49	13	7.0	2	0
2005	CLE	16	41	28	13	2.0	0	0
2006	DEN	16	36	28	8	6.0	1	0
Career		153	449	353	96	50.0	15	7

== Coaching career ==
Lang coached at Jones High School in Orlando, Florida with Charlie Frye in 2008. He took a team that was 1–9 in 2007 and turned them into a playoff team in his first season. Lang was the head football coach at Wekiva High School in Apopka, Florida from 2013 to 2015. His most recent high school coaching position was at his alma mater, Evans High School in Orlando, Florida, until 2023, when Lang took an assistant coaching position at North Carolina A&T State University.

Lang also founded the Kenard Lang Foundation, which focuses on cancer, youth, and education.

== Head coaching record ==
Year	Team	Overall	Conference	Standing	Bowl/playoffs
Jones Fightin' Tigers () (2008–2012)
2008	Jones	7–4	3–1	2nd	
2009	Jones	5–6	1–2	2nd	
2010	Jones	9–3	2–1	2nd	
2011	Jones	3–9	1–2	3rd	
2012	Jones	8–5	2–1	2nd	
Jones:		32–27	9–7		
Wekiva Mustangs () (2013–2015)
2013	Wekiva	5–5	3–3	3rd	
2014	Wekiva	8–3	5–1	2nd	
2015	Wekiva	6–4	1–2	3rd	
Wekiva:		19–12	9–6		
Maynard Evans Trojans () (2016–2022)
2016	Maynard Evans	2–8	0–3	4th	
2017	Maynard Evans	4–7	0–2	4th	
2018	Maynard Evans	1–9	0–2	4th	
2019	Maynard Evans	5–5	1–2	4th	
2020	Maynard Evans	2–5	0–0	N/A	
2021	Maynard Evans	3–7	0–3	5th	
2022	Maynard Evans	3–7	1–3	5th	
Maynard Evans:		20–48	2–14		
Total:		65–84			
