= Buddy Crutchfield =

American football player (born 1976)

No. 41, 36
- Position: Cornerback

Personal information
- Born: March 7, 1976 (age 50); Raleigh, North Carolina, U.S.
- Listed height: 5 ft 10 in (1.78 m)
- Listed weight: 187 lb (85 kg)

Career information
- High school: Athens Drive
- College: North Carolina Central
- NFL draft: 1998: undrafted

Career history
- Washington Redskins (1998); New York Jets (1999); St. Louis Rams (2001)*; Carolina Cobras (2003)
- * Offseason or practice squad member only
- Stats at Pro Football Reference

Wellington Nathaniel Crutchfield III (born March 7, 1976) is an American former professional football player who was a cornerback in the National Football League (NFL) for the Washington Redskins and the New York Jets. He played college football for the North Carolina Central Eagles.
