= Brad Badger =

American football player (born 1975)

No. 74, 70, 67
- Position: Offensive tackle/Guard

Personal information
- Born: January 11, 1975 (age 51); Corvallis, Oregon, U.S.
- Listed height: 6 ft 4 in (1.93 m)
- Listed weight: 310 lb (141 kg)

Career information
- High school: Corvallis
- College: Stanford
- NFL draft: 1997: 5th round, 162nd overall pick

Career history
- Washington Redskins (1997–1999); Minnesota Vikings (2000–2001); Oakland Raiders (2002–2006); Arizona Cardinals (2007)

Awards and highlights
- 2× Second-team All-Pac-10 (1994, 1996)

Career NFL statistics
- Games played: 134
- Games started: 64
- Fumble recoveries: 6
- Stats at Pro Football Reference

Bradley Thomas Badger (born January 11, 1975) is an American former professional football player who was a guard and offensive tackle in the National Football League (NFL). He played college football for the Stanford Cardinal and was selected by the Washington Redskins in the fifth round of the 1997 NFL draft.

== Early life ==
Badger attended Corvallis High School in Corvallis, Oregon, and starred in football, basketball, and baseball. He was an All-American selection and rated Oregon's best prospect by Tom Lemming's Prep Football Report at Corvallis High School. In six games as a senior tight end, he had 12 receptions for 260 yards and three touchdowns. As a junior, he earned honorable mention All-State honors, catching 18 passes for 252 yards and a score. Badger also lettered in baseball and basketball. He was named honorable mention All-State in basketball as a junior and first-team All-State in his senior year at center.

== College career ==
At Stanford University, Badger was converted from a tight end into an offensive lineman. He was a three-year starter for the Cardinal, starting 34 of 35 games dating back to his sophomore year. As a senior, he was named to the All-Pac-10 first-team.

== Professional career ==
=== 1997 NFL Combine and Draft ===
Badger was invited to the 1997 NFL Combine held at the RCA Dome in Indianapolis. Badger's 20-yard shuttle time of 4.13 seconds was the fastest of any offensive lineman that year, and to this day is still the fastest time by any offensive guard or tackle officially timed at the NFL Combine, having only been matched in 2017 by Jessamen Dunker of Tennessee State.

Initially projected to be a late first day selection, Badger was selected in the fifth round on day two of the 1997 NFL draft by the Washington Redskins.

Pre-draft measurables
Height	Weight	40-yard dash	10-yard split	20-yard split	20-yard shuttle	Vertical jump	Broad jump
6 ft 3 2/3 in (1.92 m)	296 lb (134 kg)	5.22 s	1.80 s	3.03 s	4.13 s	32.5 in (0.83 m)	9 ft 3 in (2.82 m)
All values from NFL Combine

=== Washington Redskins ===
Badger started the season opener in his rookie season at right guard against the Carolina Panthers. He filled in for starter Tre Johnson, who was recovering from off-season shoulder surgery. In that start, Badger helped the Redskins to 198 rushing yards, their third-highest output of the season. He finished the season as a reserve, playing in 12 games.

In Badger's second season, offensive line coach and former Redskins all-pro guard Russ Grimm and head coach Norv Turner, shuffled the offensive line around and moved Badger to left tackle. After ten starts at left tackle, Badger was moved back inside to left guard. He started all 16 games in 1998.

In year three for Badger in DC, he was primarily used as a backup at offensive guard. He played in 14 games, missing 2 with an ankle injury, and started 4 games.

=== Minnesota Vikings ===
After playing for the Redskins for three seasons, Badger was signed by the Minnesota Vikings as a restricted free agent on April 10, 2000. The Redskins chose to not match the Vikings offer, and received a fifth round pick as compensation from the Vikings. Badger played exclusively as a backup in 2000 for the Vikings. In 2001, he moved into the starting lineup after longtime incumbent Todd Steussie was released for cap considerations. Badger started 12 of 13 games at tackle, while battling injuries throughout the season.

=== Oakland Raiders ===
On April 11, 2002, Badger was signed to a one-year deal as an unrestricted free agent by the Oakland Raiders. Badger played exclusively as a backup in 2002, however he did appear in Super Bowl XXXVII where the Raiders were defeated by the Tampa Bay Buccaneers. In his second season with the Raiders, Badger appeared in all 16 games at guard, starting 11 of them.

In five seasons playing for the Raiders, Badger played in 62 games, starting 31 of them. Badger was released by the Raiders on April 21, 2007.

=== Arizona Cardinals ===
After early pre-season injuries occurred on the Arizona Cardinals offensive line, the Cardinals needed to bolster there roster and Badger was signed on August 14, 2007. Badger was released by the Arizona Cardinals on September 10, 2007. As a vested veteran, the Cardinals would have been required to guarantee Badger's salary if he remained on the week one roster. Badger was quickly re-signed on September 13, 2007. He was cut again by the Arizona Cardinals on October 30, 2007.

== Personal life ==
Badger is married to the former Mercedes Cisneros, daughter of Henry Cisneros. They dated and met at Stanford University. The couple have two daughters named Karina and Natalia.
