= Eddie Mason =

American football player (born 1972)

No. 51, 53
- Position: Linebacker

Personal information
- Born: January 9, 1972 (age 54); Siler City, North Carolina, U.S.
- Listed height: 6 ft 0 in (1.83 m)
- Listed weight: 233 lb (106 kg)

Career information
- High school: Jordan-Matthews (Siler City)
- College: North Carolina
- NFL draft: 1995: 6th round, 178th overall pick

Career history
- New York Jets (1995-1996); Tampa Bay Buccaneers (1997)*; Carolina Panthers (1998)*; Jacksonville Jaguars (1998); Washington Redskins (1999–2002)
- * Offseason or practice squad member only

Career NFL statistics
- Tackles: 87
- Sacks: 3
- Passes defended: 1
- Stats at Pro Football Reference

Eddie Lee Mason (born January 9, 1972) is an American former professional football player who was a linebacker in the National Football League (NFL) for the New York Jets, the Jacksonville Jaguars, and the Washington Redskins. He played college football for the North Carolina Tar Heels and was selected in the sixth round of the 1995 NFL draft. In 2004, Mason opened a training facility and gym in Sterling, Virginia, under the name Mase Training.

Eddie Mason is the author of "Training for the Tough Game of Life," a Christian devotional book which shares stories and lessons Mason learned through football and life.
