= Norv Turner =

American football coach (born 1952)

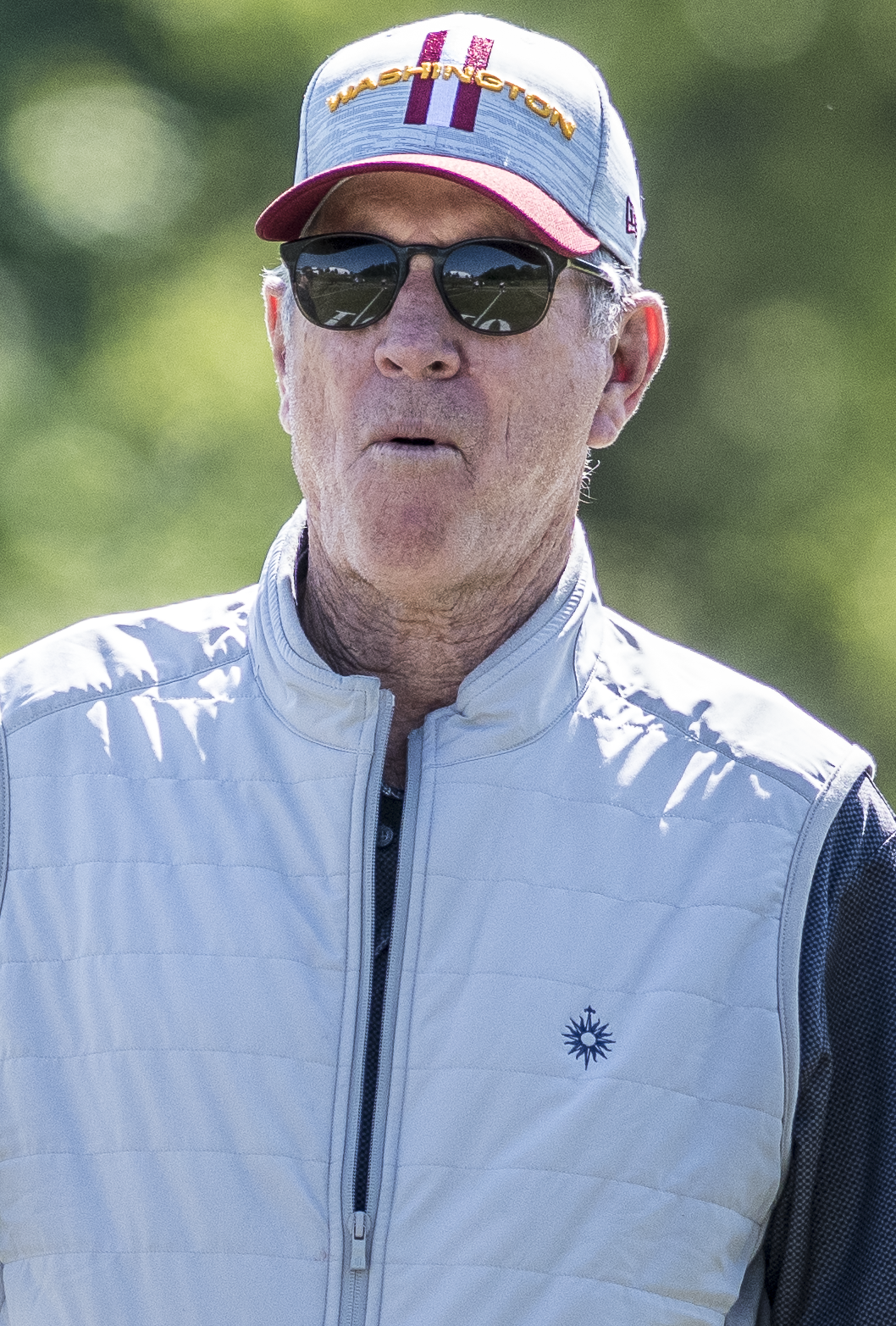
- Turner in 2021

Personal information
- Born: May 17, 1952 (age 74); Jacksonville, North Carolina, U.S.

Career information
- Position: Quarterback
- High school: Alhambra (Martinez, California)
- College: Oregon (1970–1974)

Career history
- Oregon (1975) Graduate assistant; USC (1976–1984); Wide receivers coach (1976–1979); Defensive backs coach (1980); Quarterbacks coach (1981–1983); Offensive coordinator (1984); Los Angeles Rams (1985–1990) Wide receivers coach; Dallas Cowboys (1991–1993) Offensive coordinator; Washington Redskins (1994–2000) Head coach; San Diego Chargers (2001) Offensive coordinator; Miami Dolphins (2002–2003) Offensive coordinator; Oakland Raiders (2004–2005) Head coach; San Francisco 49ers (2006) Offensive coordinator; San Diego Chargers (2007–2012) Head coach; Cleveland Browns (2013) Offensive coordinator; Minnesota Vikings (2014–2016) Offensive coordinator; Carolina Panthers (2018–2019); Offensive coordinator (2018–2019); Special assistant to the head coach (2019); Las Vegas Raiders (2024) Senior advisor

Awards and highlights
- 2× Super Bowl champion (XXVII, XXVIII); NCAA Division I champion (1978); 3× Pac-8/Pac-10 (1976, 1978, 1979)

Head coaching record
- Regular season: 114–122–1 (.483)
- Postseason: 4–4 (.500)
- Career: 118–126–1 (.484)
- Coaching profile at Pro Football Reference

Norval Eugene Turner (born May 17, 1952) is an American football coach in the National Football League (NFL). An offensive assistant for the majority of his coaching career, he was the offensive coordinator of the Dallas Cowboys during their consecutive Super Bowl victories in Super Bowl XXVII and Super Bowl XXVIII.

In addition to his assistant coaching tenure, Turner was the head coach of the Washington Redskins from 1994 to 2000, the Oakland Raiders from 2004 to 2005, and the San Diego Chargers from 2007 to 2012. Turner compiled 118 wins, which are the most for an NFL head coach with a losing record. He is also the only NFL head coach with at least 100 wins to have an overall losing record.

== Early life ==
Turner was born on May 17, 1952, at Marine Corps Base Camp Lejeune in Jacksonville, North Carolina. Turner played high school football at Alhambra High School in Martinez, California. A quarterback and safety, he graduated from Alhambra in 1970 and then attended the University of Oregon in Eugene, where he was a back-up quarterback to future hall of famer Dan Fouts, then was a starter in 1973 and 1974.

== Coaching career ==
After serving as a graduate assistant coach at Oregon in 1975, Turner was an assistant coach for the USC Trojans in 1976, hired by head coach John Robinson, also an Oregon alumnus from California. He stayed with the Trojans for nine seasons, then rejoined Robinson in the NFL with the Los Angeles Rams in 1985. Turner was an assistant with the Rams for six seasons, through 1990.

=== Dallas Cowboys ===
Turner was the offensive coordinator with the Dallas Cowboys on Jimmy Johnson's staff when Dallas won back-to-back Super Bowls in 1992 and 1993, beating the Buffalo Bills twice. Turner got much of the credit for not only their success, but for helping shape quarterback Troy Aikman into a Hall of Fame player. Upon arriving in Dallas, Turner took over an offense that was dead last in the NFL in total yards averaging 255.1 yds/gm and scoring 15.2 pts/gm, his impact was immediate. In 1991 the offense jumped to 9th in total yds with 318.8/gm and scoring 21.4/gm, and 4th in 1992 (350.4 yds/gm, 25.6 pts/gm) and 4th in 1993 (350.9 yds/gm, 23.5 pts/gm). Emmitt Smith led the NFL in rushing all 3 years under Norv Turner, and was the MVP of Super Bowl XXVIII. No team in the Super Bowl era had won with the leading rusher before Emmitt Smith under Turner in 1992 and 1993. The Dallas Cowboys had a record of 21–1 in the regular season and 5–0 in the postseason when Emmitt Smith ran for 100+ yards in a game under Turner's guidance of the offense from 1991 to 1993, usually gaining the lead early with big plays from Aikman to Michael Irvin and Jay Novacek then finishing off drives with Smith and their overpowering front line. Troy Aikman had a record of 7–18 as a starter before Turner's arrival, then 31–11 in the regular season and 6–0 as a starter in the post season winning Super Bowl XXVII MVP. Michael Irvin never finished lower than 2nd in the NFL in receiving yards under Turner. The Cowboys' record was 42–13 with 3 playoff appearances, winning 2 NFC East Division Titles (1992, 1993), 2 NFC Championships (1992, 1993), 3 Rushing Titles (1991–1993 Emmitt Smith), 1 League MVP (1993 Emmitt Smith), and 2 Super Bowls (XXVII, XXVIII), in Turner's years in Dallas.

=== Washington Redskins ===
In 1994, following his success with the Cowboys, Turner was hired as the head coach of the Washington Redskins. In seven seasons with the Redskins, he went 49–59–1. In 1996 Turner led the Redskins to a 7–1 start but finished the season 9–7. They made the playoffs only once, in 1999, where they lost to the Tampa Bay Buccaneers in the second round. He was released during the 2000 season of the Washington Redskins on December 4, 2000, following a 9–7 loss to the New York Giants where this dropped them to 7–6 on the year despite starting off with a 6–2 record. This left Turner with the distinction of being the rare NFL head coach in the post-merger era to be fired midway through a season with a winning record (Ron Meyer of New England in 1984 was another). Turner was replaced for the final 3 regular season games by interim head coach Terry Robiskie, the team finished 8–8 and missed the postseason. Following his tenure with the Redskins, Turner went on to serve as offensive coordinator for the San Diego Chargers in 2001 and for the Miami Dolphins in 2002 and 2003.

=== Oakland Raiders ===
When the Oakland Raiders fired head coach Bill Callahan following the 2003 season, owner Al Davis hired Turner to replace him. Turner went 5–11 in 2004, followed by a 4–12 record in 2005, and was fired on January 3, 2006. During Turner's two years with the Raiders, he managed only one win in intra-division games (25–24 over the host Denver Broncos on November 28, 2004).

=== San Francisco 49ers ===
On January 17, 2006, Turner was named offensive coordinator for the San Francisco 49ers, a reversal of roles of sorts: former 49ers head coach Mike Nolan served as Turner's defensive coordinator from 1997 to 1999 with the Washington Redskins.

=== San Diego Chargers ===
On February 19, 2007, Turner was hired to coach the San Diego Chargers. Though he had been a finalist to assume the same position with the Dallas Cowboys, a team for which he had been the offensive coordinator during the first two of three championship seasons in the 1990s, he eventually lost out to Wade Phillips, defensive coordinator of the Chargers at the end of the 2006 season. With a then-career coaching record of 24 games under .500, Turner took the reins of an NFL-best 14–2 record squad in the 2006 regular season with San Diego following the firing of Marty Schottenheimer.

Despite promising a strong start to the season and downplaying the effects of a major coaching turnover, Turner began the 2007 NFL season by losing 3 of his first 4 games. Fans chanted "Mar-ty! Mar-ty!" in a nod to Schottenheimer. Subsequently, Turner was thought to be redeeming himself by helping the team to a 41–3 victory over the Denver Broncos on the road, a win against arch-rival Oakland, and a third consecutive win coming out of the bye week against the Houston Texans. The euphoria in San Diego was short-lived, however, after a road loss to the then 2–5 Minnesota Vikings. By midseason, San Diego, a franchise thought to be a serious Super Bowl contender, had not won a single game against a team with a winning record. The first such win came in Week 10, when the team upset the Indianapolis Colts. This win was followed by another road loss against the Jacksonville Jaguars. After losing to yet another winning team, running back LaDainian Tomlinson called a players only meeting to discuss the season and the coaching changes. Following this, the Chargers won 6 straight regular season games, including a come-from-behind, overtime victory versus the Tennessee Titans. The next week, the Chargers managed to clinch their second straight AFC West Division title by beating the Detroit Lions in a lopsided game at home. The win against the Broncos on Monday Night Football gave Norv Turner 10 wins on the season – matching his best regular season record as a head coach.

Turner led the Chargers to their first playoff victory since 1994 with a victory over the Tennessee Titans, followed by a second playoff win over the Indianapolis Colts. The Chargers lost the AFC Championship Game to the New England Patriots, 21–12.

In the 2008 season, he led the team to an improbable comeback in the AFC West starting the season at 4–8 but winning the final four games to finish ahead of the Denver Broncos, who lost their final three games. His Chargers beat the Indianapolis Colts for the second year in a row in the playoffs, but fell short to the eventual Super Bowl champion Pittsburgh Steelers in the divisional round game where his star running back LaDainian Tomlinson was out with a groin injury.

Turner's third season in 2009 saw the Chargers continue their trend of a weak start to the season followed by a strong finish. After needing a last-minute rally to beat the Oakland Raiders in the opening week, the Chargers lost 3 of their next four games. The last loss in this stretch was at home to Denver, leaving San Diego at 2–3 and chasing the 6–0 Broncos. After easily defeating divisional opponents Kansas City and Oakland, the Chargers faced a daunting stretch that included games against the Giants, Eagles, Cowboys, and Bengals, plus traveling to Denver. Turner's team swept through them all, winning nine straight games while the Broncos entered into a midseason slump. After the ninth consecutive win, a 27–24 victory against Cincinnati on December 20, San Diego captured their third straight divisional title under Turner. After a blowout win at Tennessee and a last minute victory vs. Washington, they extended their regular season win streak to 11 games, tying a franchise record from 1961. With a 13–3 record, San Diego claimed the 2nd seed in the AFC playoffs and a first round bye. The Chargers were eliminated from the playoffs in their first playoff game of 2010 with a 17–14 home upset against the New York Jets.

On January 19, 2010, Turner signed a three-year contract extension through 2013. The Chargers started the 2010 season with a 2–3 record for the fourth consecutive year, before dropping to 2–5. On November 28, 2010, Turner recorded his 100th win as an NFL head coach. The Chargers missed the playoffs, finishing with a 9–7 record.

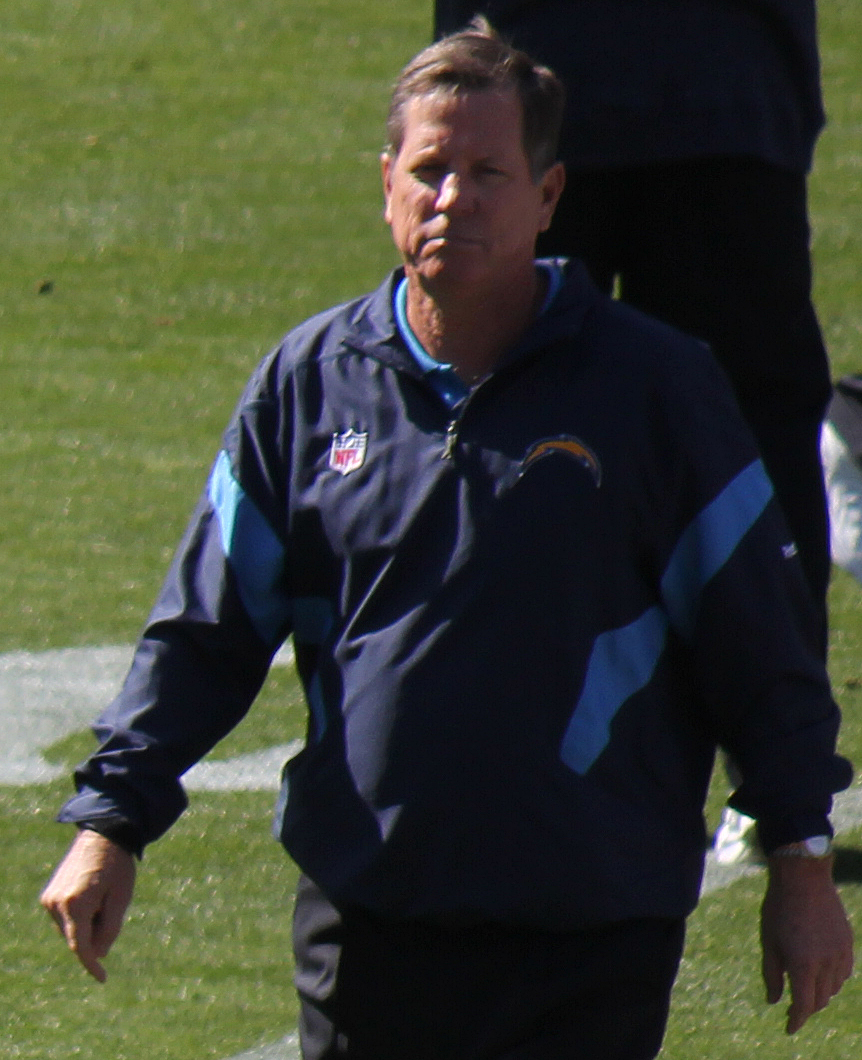
Turner with the Chargers in 2011

On September 11, 2011, Turner recorded his 100th regular season win as an NFL head coach with a 24–17 opening game victory at home, over the Vikings. He proceeded to coach the team to a 4–1 record before the team began a six-game losing streak, their longest such streak since 2001. San Diego finished with an 8–8 record and again missed the playoffs.

The Chargers started 3–1 in 2012 for the second straight season. They then lost two games in a row which they led by double digits in the second half, including a 35–24 loss to the Denver Broncos which San Diego led 24–0 at halftime. They lost a third such game after leading in the second half 13–3 with 7:51 remaining before losing 16–13 in overtime to the Baltimore Ravens. The Ravens faced fourth-and-29 at their own 37 with 1:37 left when running back Ray Rice caught a pass one yard past the line of scrimmage and escaped defenders to run 28 yards for the first down. After being 8–0 under Turner in November from 2009 to 2010, San Diego was 1–7, the second-worst November record in the league since 2011. On December 6, U-T San Diego reported that Turner and Chargers general manager A. J. Smith would be fired at the end of the season. However, Chargers president Dean Spanos denied the report, saying that final evaluations would be made at the end of the season. San Diego at 7–9 had its first losing season since 2003, Smith's first season as GM. Turner and Smith were both fired by the San Diego Chargers on December 31, 2012. Turner had one year remaining on his contract, and left with a 59–43 record in his six-year stint with the Chargers. He had the support of the players through the end of his tenure, and received a standing ovation in his final meeting with them after being fired. San Diego never made the Super Bowl under Turner despite having what was perceived as one of the league's most talented rosters. This failure to win a Super Bowl after replacing the popular Schottenheimer is believed by some to partially cause San Diego fans and citizens distrusting team management and contributing to the team's 2017 exit from San Diego. Turner believed the Chargers were the most talented team in the AFC West in his first three seasons, but not in his final three when the team lost talented players. He inherited a team with 11 Pro Bowl players in 2006, but had no players voted to the NFL's All-Star game in 2012. During Smith's tenure, the Chargers lost players such as LaDainian Tomlinson, Darren Sproles, Michael Turner and Vincent Jackson. Drew Brees, however, was replaced by Philip Rivers in a decision to go with the younger quarterback. The Chargers' offensive line grew weak in 2012. Quarterback Philip Rivers was frequently forced to scramble and was sacked 49 times, contributing to his 22 turnovers — 47 over the previous two seasons.

With losing records with the Redskins and Raiders, and a winning record with the Chargers, Turner coached more games than any other coach in NFL history who has a losing overall record.

=== Cleveland Browns ===
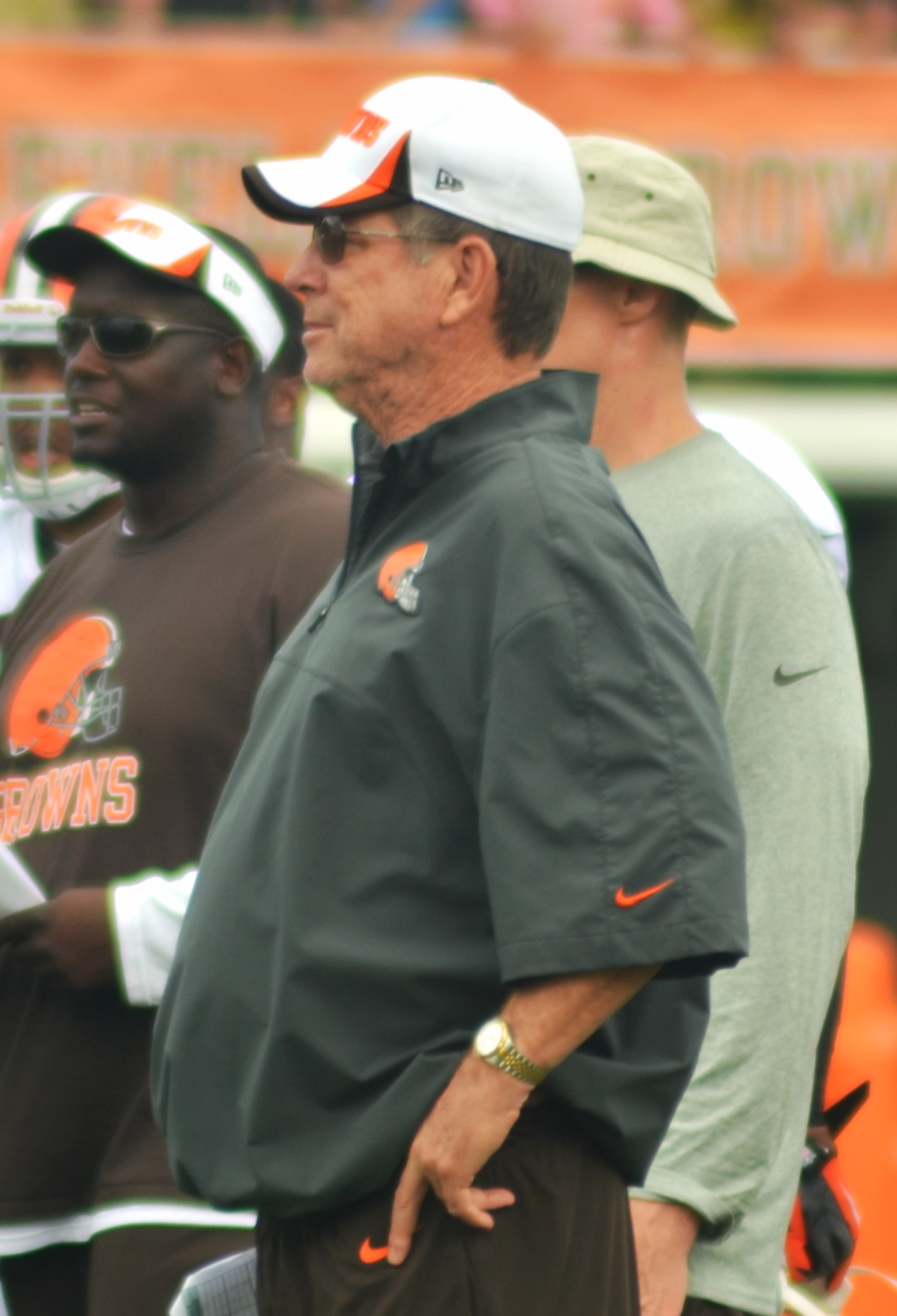
Turner with the Cleveland Browns in 2013

On January 17, 2013, Turner was hired as offensive coordinator of the Cleveland Browns. He was hired by new head coach Rob Chudzinski, whom Turner had previously on his staff with the Chargers. He replaced former coordinator Brad Childress.

=== Minnesota Vikings ===
On January 18, 2014, Turner was hired by the Minnesota Vikings as the offensive coordinator. On November 2, 2016, Turner unexpectedly resigned from his position as the Minnesota Vikings' offensive coordinator. The Vikings had lost their last two games at the time of his resignation after starting the season with five consecutive victories.

=== Carolina Panthers ===
He was hired as the Carolina Panthers offensive coordinator on January 11, 2018. Following head coach Ron Rivera's dismissal in December 2019, Turner was moved to the special assistant to the head coach.

=== Las Vegas Raiders ===
On November 5, 2024, Turner was hired by the Las Vegas Raiders as a senior advisor under head coach Antonio Pierce. This reunited him with his son Scott, who had just been promoted to interim offensive coordinator upon the firing of offensive coordinator Luke Getsy.

== Personal life ==
Turner and his wife Nancy have three children: Scott, a football coach who was most recently the passing game coordinator for the New York Jets; actress and filmmaker Stephanie; and Drew.

== Head coaching record ==
| Team | Year | Regular season | | | | | Postseason | | | |
| Team | Year | Won | Lost | Ties | Win % | Finish | Won | Lost | Win % | Result |
|---|---|---|---|---|---|---|---|---|---|---|
| WAS | 1994 | 3 | 13 | 0 | .188 | 5th in NFC East | — | — | — | — |
| WAS | 1995 | 6 | 10 | 0 | .375 | 3rd in NFC East | — | — | — | — |
| WAS | 1996 | 9 | 7 | 0 | .563 | 3rd in NFC East | — | — | — | — |
| WAS | 1997 | 8 | 7 | 1 | .531 | 2nd in NFC East | — | — | — | — |
| WAS | 1998 | 6 | 10 | 0 | .375 | 4th in NFC East | — | — | — | — |
| WAS | 1999 | 10 | 6 | 0 | .625 | 1st in NFC East | 1 | 1 | .500 | Lost to Tampa Bay Buccaneers in NFC Divisional Game |
| WAS | 2000 | 7 | 6 | 0 | .538 | 3rd in NFC East | — | — | — | — |
| WAS total | | 49 | 59 | 1 | .454 | | 1 | 1 | .500 | |
| OAK | 2004 | 5 | 11 | 0 | .313 | 4th in AFC West | — | — | — | — |
| OAK | 2005 | 4 | 12 | 0 | .250 | 4th in AFC West | — | — | — | — |
| OAK total | | 9 | 23 | 0 | .281 | | — | — | — | |
| SD | 2007 | 11 | 5 | 0 | .688 | 1st in AFC West | 2 | 1 | .667 | Lost to New England Patriots in AFC Championship Game |
| SD | 2008 | 8 | 8 | 0 | .500 | 1st in AFC West | 1 | 1 | .500 | Lost to Pittsburgh Steelers in AFC Divisional Game |
| SD | 2009 | 13 | 3 | 0 | .813 | 1st in AFC West | 0 | 1 | .000 | Lost to New York Jets in AFC Divisional Game |
| SD | 2010 | 9 | 7 | 0 | .563 | 2nd in AFC West | — | — | — | — |
| SD | 2011 | 8 | 8 | 0 | .500 | 2nd in AFC West | — | — | — | — |
| SD | 2012 | 7 | 9 | 0 | .438 | 2nd in AFC West | — | — | — | — |
| SD total | | 56 | 40 | 0 | .583 | | 3 | 3 | .500 | |
| Total | | 114 | 122 | 1 | .483 | | 4 | 4 | .500 | |
