= David Terrell (safety) =

American football player (born 1975)

No. 25, 31, 35
- Position: Safety

Personal information
- Born: July 8, 1975 (age 51); Floydada, Texas, U.S.
- Listed height: 6 ft 1 in (1.85 m)
- Listed weight: 190 lb (86 kg)

Career information
- High school: Sweetwater (TX)
- College: Texas–El Paso
- NFL draft: 1998: 7th round, 191st overall pick

Career history
- Washington Redskins (1998)*; Rhein Fire (1999); Washington Redskins (1999–2003); Oakland Raiders (2004)
- * Offseason or practice squad member only

Career NFL statistics
- Tackles: 198
- Interceptions: 6
- Sacks: 1
- Stats at Pro Football Reference

David Wayne Terrell (born July 8, 1975) is an American former professional football player who was a safety in the National Football League (NFL). He played college football for the UTEP Miners and was selected by the Washington Redskins in the seventh round of the 1998 NFL draft with the 191st overall pick.

Terrell also played for the Oakland Raiders.

== NFL career statistics ==
Legend
| **Bold** | Career high |

| Year | Team | Games | | Tackles | | | | Interceptions | | | | Fumbles | | | |
| Year | Team | GP | GS | Comb | Solo | Ast | Sck | Int | Yds | TD | Lng | FF | FR | Yds | TD |
|---|---|---|---|---|---|---|---|---|---|---|---|---|---|---|---|
| 2000 | WAS | 16 | 0 | 14 | 13 | 1 | 0.0 | 0 | 0 | 0 | 0 | 0 | **2** | 0 | 0 |
| 2001 | WAS | 16 | 16 | **77** | **67** | 10 | **1.0** | **2** | 0 | 0 | 0 | **1** | 1 | 0 | 0 |
| 2002 | WAS | 16 | 16 | 65 | 49 | **16** | 0.0 | **2** | **41** | 0 | **22** | 0 | 1 | 0 | 0 |
| 2003 | WAS | 13 | 0 | 24 | 19 | 5 | 0.0 | **2** | 21 | 0 | 20 | 0 | 1 | 0 | 0 |
| 2004 | OAK | 16 | 0 | 18 | 15 | 3 | 0.0 | 0 | 0 | 0 | 0 | 0 | 0 | 0 | 0 |
| Career | | 77 | 32 | 198 | 163 | 35 | 1.0 | 6 | 62 | 0 | 22 | 1 | 5 | 0 | 0 |
