= Malcolm Hamilton (American football) =

American football player (born 1972)

No. 55, 58, 56, 35
- Position: Linebacker

Personal information
- Born: December 31, 1972 (age 53); Dallas, Texas, U.S.

Career information
- College: Baylor

Career history
- 1997: Washington Redskins*
- 1998: Atlanta Falcons*
- 1998–1999: Washington Redskins
- 2001: Birmingham Thunderbolts
- 2001: New Jersey Gladiators
- 2001–2002: Los Angeles Avengers
- * Offseason or practice squad member only
- Stats at Pro Football Reference

Malcolm Xavier Hamilton (born December 31, 1972) is an American former professional football player who was a linebacker for the Washington Redskins of the National Football League (NFL), He played college football for the Baylor Bears. Hamilton was also in the NFL on the Atlanta Falcons' practice squad. Additionally, he played XFL football for the Birmingham Bolts and in the Arena Football League for the New Jersey Gladiators and Los Angeles Avengers.

Hamilton played high school football at Odessa Permian High School, captured in the movie and TV series Friday Night Lights.
