= Mark Fischer (American football) =

American football player (born 1974)

No. 51, 60
- Position: Center

Personal information
- Born: July 29, 1974 (age 52); Cincinnati, Ohio, U.S.
- Listed height: 6 ft 3 in (1.91 m)
- Listed weight: 303 lb (137 kg)

Career information
- High school: La Salle (Cincinnati)
- College: Purdue
- NFL draft: 1998: 5th round, 140th overall pick

Career history
- Washington Redskins (1998–2001); Denver Broncos (2002)*
- * Offseason or practice squad member only

Career NFL statistics
- Games played: 22
- Games started: 16
- Stats at Pro Football Reference

Mark Raymond Fischer (born July 29, 1974) is an American former professional football player who was a center for the Washington Redskins of the National Football League (NFL). He played college football for the Purdue Boilermakers and was selected 140th overall in the fifth round of the 1998 NFL draft.

During the 2000 NFL season, Fischer became Washington's starting center, starting in all 16 games. The following year, Cory Raymer regained his starting position. In week 4 of the 2001 season Fischer sustained a season ending ACL rupture. He signed with the Denver Broncos in 2002 but was released before the season started. As of 2013 he is a Managing Director at PNC Capital Markets LLC division of PNC Financial Services Group.
