= Twan Russell =

American football player (born 1974)

No. 98, 56, 55
- Position: Linebacker

Personal information
- Born: April 25, 1974 (age 52); Fort Lauderdale, Florida, U.S.
- Listed height: 6 ft 1 in (1.85 m)
- Listed weight: 230 lb (104 kg)

Career information
- High school: St. Thomas Aquinas (Fort Lauderdale, Florida)
- College: Miami (FL)
- NFL draft: 1997: 5th round, 148th overall pick

Career history
- Washington Redskins (1997–1999); Miami Dolphins (2000–2002); Atlanta Falcons (2003)

Career NFL statistics
- Tackles: 69
- Fumble recoveries: 1
- Stats at Pro Football Reference

Twan Sanchez Russell (born April 25, 1974) is an American former professional football player who was a linebacker in the National Football League (NFL) for the Washington Redskins, Miami Dolphins, and Atlanta Falcons. He played college football for the Miami Hurricanes.

== High school ==
Russell attended St. Thomas Aquinas High School, where he played football. He also participated in track and field, where he won the State Championship in the 300-meter hurdles.

== College career ==
Russell then received a scholarship to play at the University of Miami, where he led the Hurricanes in tackles (115) and was named special teams captain.

Russell graduated with degrees in Broadcast communications and Criminology.

== Professional career ==
Russell was selected in the fifth round of the 1997 NFL draft by the Washington Redskins. He would also play for the Miami Dolphins and the Atlanta Falcons before retiring from injury in November 2004.
