= Larry Bowie (running back) =

American football player (born 1973)

No. 47
- Position: Fullback

Personal information
- Born: March 21, 1973 (age 53); Anniston, Alabama, U.S.
- Listed height: 6 ft 0 in (1.83 m)
- Listed weight: 249 lb (113 kg)

Career information
- High school: Anniston
- College: Georgia
- NFL draft: 1996: undrafted

Career history
- Washington Redskins (1996–1999); New England Patriots (2001)*; St. Louis Rams (2001)
- * Offseason or practice squad member only

Career NFL statistics
- Rushing yards: 108
- Rushing average: 3.4
- Receptions: 44
- Receiving yards: 458
- Total touchdowns: 5
- Stats at Pro Football Reference

Larry Darnell Bowie Jr. (born March 21, 1973) is an American former professional football player who was a fullback for the Washington Redskins of the National Football League (NFL) from 1996 to 1999. He played college football for the Georgia Bulldogs.
