= Tre' Johnson =

American football player (1971–2026)

No. 77, 67
- Position: Offensive guard

Personal information
- Born: August 30, 1971; New York City, U.S.
- Died: February 15, 2026 (aged 54)
- Listed height: 6 ft 2 in (1.88 m)
- Listed weight: 326 lb (148 kg)

Career information
- High school: Peekskill (Peekskill, New York)
- College: Temple
- NFL draft: 1994: 2nd round, 31st overall pick

Career history
- Washington Redskins (1994–2000); Cleveland Browns (2001); Washington Redskins (2002)

Awards and highlights
- Second-team All-Pro (1999); Pro Bowl (1999); First-team All-East (1991)

Career NFL statistics
- Games played: 93
- Games started: 72
- Fumble recoveries: 4
- Stats at Pro Football Reference

Edward Stanton Johnson III (August 30, 1971 – February 15, 2026) was an American professional football player who was an offensive guard in the National Football League (NFL) for the Washington Redskins and Cleveland Browns.

== Biography ==
Johnson was born in New York City on August 30, 1971. His father played for the New York Nets in the American Basketball Association, and one grandfather was a Negro league baseball player. Johnson attended Peekskill High School where, according to The Washington Post, he was "a track star ... who excelled at the shot put, javelin, discus and hammer." Johnson played college football for the Temple Owls and was selected 31st overall in the second round of the 1994 NFL draft. He was selected to the 1999 Pro Bowl.

Pre-draft measurables
Height	Weight	Arm length	Hand span	40-yard dash	10-yard split	20-yard split	20-yard shuttle	Vertical jump
6 ft 2 7/8 in (1.90 m)	315 lb (143 kg)	33 in (0.84 m)	9 1/4 in (0.23 m)	5.23 s	1.84 s	3.07 s	4.51 s	25.0 in (0.64 m)

Johnson was a history teacher and a coach at the Landon School. He was married and had four children. Johnson died on February 15, 2026, at the age of 54.
