= 1995 Washington Redskins season =

NFL team season

- Owner: Jack Kent Cooke
- General manager: Charley Casserly
- President: John Kent Cooke
- Head coach: Norv Turner
- Offensive coordinator: Norv Turner
- Defensive coordinator: Ron Lynn
- Home stadium: RFK Stadium

Results
- Record: 6–10
- Division place: 3rd NFC East
- Playoffs: Did not qualify
- All-Pros: KR Brian Mitchell
- Pro Bowlers: LB Ken Harvey; KR Brian Mitchell

The 1995 Washington Redskins season was the franchise's 64th season in the National Football League. The team improved on their 3–13 record from 1994, but missed the playoffs for the third consecutive season. The Redskins were able to sweep the Cowboys who would go on to win the Super Bowl.

== Offseason ==
=== NFL draft ===
1995 Washington Redskins draft
Round	Pick	Player	Position	College	Notes
1	4	Michael Westbrook	Wide receiver	Colorado	
2	37	Cory Raymer	Center	Wisconsin	
3	68	Darryl Pounds	Defensive back	Nicholls State	
4	103	Larry Jones	Running back	Miami (FL)	
5	137	Jamie Asher	Tight end	Louisville	
5	152	Rich Owens	Defensive end	Lehigh	
6	176	Brian Thure	Offensive tackle	California	
7	226	Scott Turner	Defensive back	Illinois	
Made roster

=== Undrafted free agents ===
1995 undrafted free agents of note
Player	Position	College
Zach Abraham	Wide receiver	West Virginia
Patrise Alexander	Linebacker	SWLouisiana
Scott Blanton	Kicker	Oklahoma
Damon Burrest	Defensive Tackle	New Mexico
Kareem Carpenter	Tight End	Eastern Michigan
Ken Dammann	Guard	Rutgers
Dan Esposito	Running back	Millersville State
Joe Frazier	Fullback	Auburn
Marcus Hunter	Linebacker	North Alabama
Reggie Jones	Wide receiver	LSU
Ron Lewis	Guard	Washington State
Elic Mahone	Defensive end	USC

== Personnel ==
=== Staff ===
1995 Washington Redskins staff
Front office: Chairman of the Board/CEO – Jack Kent Cooke; Executive Vice President – John Kent Cooke; General Manager – Charley Casserly; Assistant General Manager – Bobby Mitchell; Director of College Scouting – George Saimes; Head coaches: Head Coach – Norv Turner; Offensive coaches: Quarterbacks – Cam Cameron; Running Backs – Bobby Jackson; Wide Receivers – Terry Robiskie; Tight Ends – Russ Grimm; Offensive Line – Jim Hanifan	Defensive coaches: Defensive Coordinator – Ron Lynn; Defensive Line – Bob Karmelowicz; Linebackers – Mike Haluchak; Defensive Backs – Tom Hayes; Assistant Secondary – Ray Horton; Special teams coaches: Special Teams – Pete Rodriguez; Strength and conditioning: Strength – Dan Riley; Conditioning Director – Jason Arapoff

=== Roster ===
1995 Washington Redskins roster
Quarterbacks (QB): 12 Gus Frerotte; 10 Trent Green; 5 Heath Shuler; Running backs (RB): 21 Terry Allen; 36 William Bell; 40 Reggie Brooks; 23 Larry Jones; 20 Marc Logan FB; 30 Brian Mitchell; Wide receivers (WR): 85 Henry Ellard; 86 Leslie Shepherd; 80 Olanda Truitt; 82 Michael Westbrook; 83 Tydus Winans; Tight ends (TE): 84 Jamie Asher; 87 Coleman Bell; 89 Scott Galbraith; 88 James Jenkins	Offensive linemen (OL): 65 Ray Brown G; 63 John Gesek C/G; 77 Tre' Johnson G; 71 Ron Lewis G; 68 Joe Patton T; 52 Cory Raymer C; 76 Ed Simmons T; 61 Vernice Smith G; 74 Brian Thure T; Defensive linemen (DL): 72 Romeo Bandison DT; 93 Marc Boutte DT; 96 Mike Flores DE; 95 William Gaines DT; 78 Tim Johnson DT; 73 Rich Owens DE; 92 Dexter Nottage DE; 98 Tony Woods DE	Linebackers (LB): 50 Darrick Brownlow MLB; 90 Terry Crews OLB; 56 Dion Foxx OLB; 57 Ken Harvey OLB; 53 Marvcus Patton OLB; 99 Rod Stephens MLB; 91 Matt Vanderbeek OLB; Defensive backs (DB): 25 Tom Carter CB; 28 Darrell Green CB; 38 Darryl Morrison FS; 31 Darryl Pounds CB; 24 Stanley Richard FS; 27 Keith Taylor SS; 29 Scott Turner CB; 37 James Washington SS; Special teams (ST): 64 Trevor Matich LS; 2 Eddie Murray K; 1 Matt Turk P	Practice squad: 58 Patrise Alexander LB; 60 Matt Storm G; 22 Eric Sutton CB; 75 Don Reynolds DE; 18 Michael Watkins WR; Reserve: 16 Scott Blanton K (IR); 79 Jim Lachey T (IR); -- Elic Mahone DE (IR); 26 Muhammad Oliver CB (IR); 97 Sterling Palmer DE (IR); 94 Bobby Wilson DT (IR); 53 active, 6 inactive, 5 practice squad Rookies in italics

== Regular season ==
=== Schedule ===
Week	Date	Opponent	Result	Record	Venue	Attendance
1	September 3	**Arizona Cardinals**	**W** 27–7	1—0	RFK Stadium	52,731
2	September 10	Oakland Raiders	**L** 8–20	1—1	RFK Stadium	54,548
3	September 17	at Denver Broncos	**L** 31–38	1—2	Mile High Stadium	71,930
4	September 24	at Tampa Bay Buccaneers	**L** 6–14	1—3	Tampa Stadium	49,234
5	October 1	**Dallas Cowboys**	**W** 27–23	2—3	RFK Stadium	55,489
6	October 8	at **Philadelphia Eagles**	**L** 34–37	2—4	Veterans Stadium	65,498
7	October 15	at **Arizona Cardinals**	**L** 20–24	2—5	Sun Devil Stadium	42,370
8	October 22	Detroit Lions	**W** 36–30 (OT)	3—5	RFK Stadium	52,332
9	October 29	**New York Giants**	**L** 15–24	3—6	RFK Stadium	53,310
10	November 5	at Kansas City Chiefs	**L** 3–24	3—7	Arrowhead Stadium	77,821
11	Bye					
12	November 19	Seattle Seahawks	**L** 20–27	3—8	RFK Stadium	51,298
13	November 26	**Philadelphia Eagles**	**L** 7–14	3—9	RFK Stadium	50,539
14	December 3	at **Dallas Cowboys**	**W** 24–17	4—9	Texas Stadium	64,866
15	December 10	at **New York Giants**	**L** 13–20	4—10	Giants Stadium	48,247
16	December 17	at St. Louis Rams	**W** 35–23	5—10	Trans World Dome	63,760
17	December 24	Carolina Panthers	**W** 20–17	6—10	RFK Stadium	42,903
Note: Intra-divisional opponents are in **bold** text.

=== Standings ===
NFC East
	W	L	T	PCT	PF	PA	STK
^{(1)} Dallas Cowboys	12	4	0	.750	435	291	W2
^{(4)} Philadelphia Eagles	10	6	0	.625	318	338	L1
Washington Redskins	6	10	0	.375	326	359	W2
New York Giants	5	11	0	.313	290	340	L2
Arizona Cardinals	4	12	0	.250	275	422	L4
