= 1996 Washington Redskins season =

NFL team season

- Owner: Jack Kent Cooke
- General manager: Charley Casserly
- President: John Kent Cooke
- Head coach: Norv Turner
- Offensive coordinator: Norv Turner
- Defensive coordinator: Ron Lynn
- Home stadium: RFK Stadium

Results
- Record: 9–7
- Division place: 3rd NFC East
- Playoffs: Did not qualify
- Pro Bowlers: QB Gus Frerotte; CB Darrell Green; LB Ken Harvey; RB Terry Allen; P Matt Turk

The 1996 season was the Washington Redskins' 65th in the National Football League, and their 61st since the franchise moved to Washington, D.C. It was their last season playing at RFK Stadium, where they had played since 1961. They began the season aiming to improve on their 6–10 record from the year before, but after winning seven of their first eight games, they managed just two victories in the second half of the season and finished with a 9–7 record. By virtue of their inferior intra-conference record (6–6) compared to the Minnesota Vikings (8–4), the Redskins became the first team since the 1988 New Orleans Saints to start the season 7–1 and not make the playoffs.

Although the Redskins' offense was eighth in the league in scoring, their defense surrendered 2,275 rushing yards (142.2 yards per game), the most in the NFL that year. Statistics site Football Outsiders calculated that the team had the worst run defense they had ever tracked. At the end of the season, in a 37–10 victory over the Dallas Cowboys, past and present Redskins greats were honored at halftime.

== Offseason ==
=== NFL draft ===
1996 Washington Redskins draft
Round	Pick	Player	Position	College	Notes
1	30	Andre Johnson	Offensive tackle	Penn State	
4	102	Stephen Davis *	Running back	Auburn	
5	138	Leomont Evans	Safety	Clemson	
6	174	Kelvin Kinney	Defensive end	Virginia State	
7	215	Jeremy Asher	Linebacker	Oregon	
7	250	DeAndre Maxwell	Wide receiver	San Diego State	
Made roster * Made at least one Pro Bowl during career

== Personnel ==
=== Staff ===
1996 Washington Redskins staff
Front office: Chairman of the Board/COO – Jack Kent Cooke; Executive Vice President – John Kent Cooke; General Manager – Charley Casserly; Assistant General Manager – Bobby Mitchell; Director of College Scouting – George Saimes; Head coaches: Head Coach – Norv Turner; Offensive coaches: Quarterbacks – Cam Cameron; Running Backs – Bobby Jackson; Wide Receivers – Terry Robiskie; Tight Ends – Russ Grimm; Offensive Line – Jim Hanifan	Defensive coaches: Defensive Coordinator – Ron Lynn; Defensive Line – Bob Karmelowicz; Linebackers – Mike Haluchak; Defensive Backs – Tom Hayes; Assistant Secondary – Ray Horton; Special teams coaches: Special Teams – Pete Rodriguez; Strength and conditioning: Strength – Dan Riley; Conditioning Director – Jason Arapoff

=== Roster ===
1996 Washington Redskins roster
Quarterbacks (QB): 12 Gus Frerotte; 10 Trent Green; 5 Heath Shuler; Running backs (RB): 21 Terry Allen; 35 William Bell; 47 Larry Bowie FB; 48 Stephen Davis; 20 Marc Logan FB; 30 Brian Mitchell; Wide receivers (WR): 83 Flipper Anderson; 80 Bill Brooks; 85 Henry Ellard; 86 Leslie Shepherd; 82 Michael Westbrook; Tight ends (TE): 84 Jamie Asher; 87 Harold Bishop; 89 Scott Galbraith; 88 James Jenkins	Offensive linemen (OL): 73 Darryl Ashmore T; 75 Bob Dahl G; 69 Andre Johnson T; 77 Tre' Johnson G; 68 Joe Patton T; 67 Shar Pourdanesh T; 59 Chris Sedoris C; 76 Ed Simmons T; 55 Jeff Uhlenhake C; Defensive linemen (DL): 72 Romeo Bandison DT; 90 Troy Barnett DE; 95 William Gaines DT; 94 Sean Gilbert DT; 78 Ryan Kuehl DT; 92 Dexter Nottage DE; 96 Rich Owens DE; 98 Tony Woods DE	Linebackers (LB): 58 Patrise Alexander MLB; 50 Darrick Brownlow MLB; 54 Al Catanho OLB; 57 Ken Harvey OLB; 53 Marvcus Patton OLB; 99 Rod Stephens MLB; Defensive backs (DB): 23 Tomur Barnes CB; 25 Tom Carter CB; 35 Leomont Evans FS; 28 Darrell Green CB; 31 Darryl Pounds CB; 24 Stanley Richard FS; 27 Keith Taylor SS; 29 Scott Turner CB; 45 Brian Walker SS; Special teams (ST): 16 Scott Blanton K; 64 Trevor Matich LS; 1 Matt Turk P	Practice squad: 56 Jeremy Asher LB; 62 Mark Lee DE (PS/I); 13 Deandre Maxwell WR; 46 Ed Smith TE; 22 Eric Sutton CB; Reserve: 93 Marc Boutte DT (IR); 92 Brannon Kennedy WR (IR); 70 Kelvin Kinney DE (IR); 38 Darryl Morrison S (IR); 26 Muhammad Oliver CB (IR); 97 Sterling Palmer DE (IR); 52 Cory Raymer C (NF-Inj.); 71 Matt Reem T (IR); 74 Brian Thure T (IR); 91 Matt Vanderbeek LB (IR); 53 active, 11 inactive, 4 practice squad Rookies in italics

== Regular season ==
=== Schedule ===
Week	Date	Opponent	Result	Record	Venue	Attendance
1	September 1	Philadelphia Eagles	L 14–17	0–1	Robert F. Kennedy Memorial Stadium	53,415
2	September 8	Chicago Bears	W 10–3	1–1	Robert F. Kennedy Memorial Stadium	52,711
3	September 15	at New York Giants	W 31–10	2–1	Giants Stadium	71,693
4	September 22	at St. Louis Rams	W 17–10	3–1	Trans World Dome	62,303
5	September 29	New York Jets	W 31–16	4–1	Robert F. Kennedy Memorial Stadium	52,068
6	Bye					
7	October 13	at New England Patriots	W 27–22	5–1	Foxboro Stadium	59,638
8	October 20	New York Giants	W 31–21	6–1	Robert F. Kennedy Memorial Stadium	52,684
9	October 27	Indianapolis Colts	W 31–16	7–1	Robert F. Kennedy Memorial Stadium	54,254
10	November 3	at Buffalo Bills	L 13–38	7–2	Rich Stadium	78,002
11	November 10	Arizona Cardinals	L 34–37 (OT)	7–3	Robert F. Kennedy Memorial Stadium	51,929
12	November 17	at Philadelphia Eagles	W 26–21	8–3	Veterans Stadium	66,834
13	November 24	San Francisco 49ers	L 16–19	8–4	Robert F. Kennedy Memorial Stadium	54,235
14	November 28	at Dallas Cowboys	L 10–21	8–5	Texas Stadium	64,955
15	December 8	at Tampa Bay Buccaneers	L 10–24	8–6	Houlihan's Stadium	44,733
16	December 15	at Arizona Cardinals	L 26–27	8–7	Sun Devil Stadium	34,260
17	December 22	Dallas Cowboys	W 37–10	9–7	Robert F. Kennedy Memorial Stadium	56,454

=== Standings ===
NFC East
	W	L	T	PCT	PF	PA	STK
^{(3)} Dallas Cowboys	10	6	0	.625	286	250	L1
^{(5)} Philadelphia Eagles	10	6	0	.625	363	341	W2
Washington Redskins	9	7	0	.563	364	312	W1
Arizona Cardinals	7	9	0	.438	300	397	L1
New York Giants	6	10	0	.375	242	297	L2

== Awards and records ==
- Darrell Green, Walter Payton Man of the Year Award
