= 1994 Washington Redskins season =

NFL team season

- Owner: Jack Kent Cooke
- General manager: Charley Casserly
- President: John Kent Cooke
- Head coach: Norv Turner
- Offensive coordinator: Norv Turner
- Defensive coordinator: Ron Lynn
- Home stadium: RFK Stadium

Results
- Record: 3–13
- Division place: 5th NFC East
- Playoffs: Did not qualify
- Pro Bowlers: LB Ken Harvey; P Reggie Roby

The 1994 Washington Redskins season was the franchise's 63rd season in the National Football League (NFL) and their 58th in Washington, D.C.

The Redskins' 3–13 season was the worst record the team had posted since 1961, and the fewest wins they have ever gained in a 16-game season, an ignominy later matched by their 2013 and 2019 seasons. The team was decimated by the onset of the modern salary cap and free agency system. The Redskins were forced to depend on younger and untested players at many key positions.

The season marked the hiring of head coach Norv Turner, who would spend the next six seasons coaching the Redskins.

In addition to going winless at RFK in 1994, Turner's first season in Washington saw the team lose at home to the Atlanta Falcons for the first time. Prior to the Falcons' 27–20 victory in Week 4, Atlanta had been 0–10 against the Redskins at RFK. This included a 24–7 loss to the Redskins during Washington's most recent championship season.

== Offseason ==
=== NFL draft ===
1994 Washington Redskins draft
| Round | Pick | Player | Position | College | Notes |
| 1 | 3 | Heath Shuler | Quarterback | Tennessee | |
| 2 | 31 | Tre' Johnson * | Offensive tackle | Temple | |
| 3 | 68 | Tydus Winans | Wide receiver | Fresno State | |
| 3 | 97 | Joe Patton | Guard | Alabama A&M | |
| 4 | 105 | Kurt Haws | Tight end | Utah | |
| 6 | 163 | Dexter Nottage | Defensive end | Florida A&M | |
| 7 | 197 | Gus Frerotte * | Quarterback | Tulsa | |
Made roster * Made at least one Pro Bowl during career

== Personnel ==
=== Staff ===
1994 Washington Redskins staff
| Front office: Chairman of the board/chief executive officer – Jack Kent Cooke; Executive vice-president – John Kent Cooke; General manager – Charley Casserly; Assistant general manager – Bobby Mitchell; Director of player personnel – Kirk Mee; Director of college scouting – George Saimes; Head coaches: Head coach – Norv Turner; Offensive coaches: Quarterbacks – Cam Cameron; Running backs – Bobby Jackson; Wide receivers – Terry Robiskie; Tight ends – Russ Grimm; Offensive line – Jim Hanifan | Defensive coaches: Defensive coordinator – Ron Lynn; Defensive line – Bob Karmelowicz; Linebackers – Mike Haluchak; Defensive backs – Emmitt Thomas; Defensive assistant – Ray Horton; Special teams coaches: Special teams – Pete Rodriguez; Strength and conditioning: Strength – Dan Riley; Assistant Strength – Jason Arapoff |

=== Roster ===
1994 Washington Redskins roster
| Quarterbacks (QB): 12 Gus Frerotte; 17 John Friesz; 5 Heath Shuler; Running backs (RB): 36 William Bell; 40 Reggie Brooks; 32 Ricky Ervins; 30 Brian Mitchell; 39 Tyrone Rush; 37 Cedric Smith FB; Wide receivers (WR): 85 Henry Ellard; 80 Desmond Howard; 86 Leslie Shepherd; 84 Olanda Truitt; 83 Tydus Winans; Tight ends (TE): 87 Coleman Bell; 82 Kurt Haws; 89 Ethan Horton; 88 James Jenkins | Offensive linemen (OL): 67 Ray Brown G/T; 75 John Gesek C; 77 Tre' Johnson T; 63 Raleigh McKenzie G; 68 Joe Patton G/T; 69 Mark Schlereth G; 76 Ed Simmons T; 61 Vernice Smith G; Defensive linemen (DL): 93 Marc Boutte DT; 91 Shane Collins DE; 78 Tim Johnson DT; 70 Leonard Marshall DE/DT; 72 Lamar Mills DE/DT; 92 Dexter Nottage DE; 97 Sterling Palmer DE; 94 Bobby Wilson DT; 98 Tony Woods DE | Linebackers (LB): 56 Erick Anderson OLB; 51 Monte Coleman OLB; 55 Andre Collins OLB; 54 Kurt Gouveia MLB; 57 Ken Harvey OLB; 90 Tyronne Stowe MLB; Defensive backs (DB): 34 Martin Bayless SS; 25 Tom Carter CB; 24 Pat Eilers FS; 26 Alan Grant CB/S; 28 Darrell Green CB; 47 A. J. Johnson CB; 38 Darryl Morrison FS; 23 Sebastian Savage CB/S; 41 Johnny Thomas CB; Special teams (ST): 8 Chip Lohmiller K; 64 Trevor Matich LS; 1 Reggie Roby P | Practice squad: 95 Anthony Abrams DT; —- Gonzalo Floyd DE; 62 Alai Kalaniuvalu G; Reserve: -- Rick Graf LB (IR); -- Martin Hochertz DE (IR); 79 Jim Lachey T (IR); 20 Alvoid Mays CB (IR); -- Mark Stock WR (IR); 29 Keith Taylor S (IR); 22 Frank Wycheck TE (Susp.); 53 active, 7 inactive, 3 practice squad Rookies in italics |

== Regular season ==
The Redskins not only finished with the second worst record in 1994 at 3–13, just behind the 2–14 Oilers, but also suffered their worst 16–game season in terms of wins, although this would later be tied in 2013 and 2019. The Redskins suffered nine of their thirteen defeats by less than a full touchdown and only the two defeats to the Dallas Cowboys came by more than 20 points. All three of the Redskins' wins are on the road; the team failed to win a home game all season, going 0–8 when playing at RFK, including their biggest low point, losing to Atlanta for their first ever home loss to that team in eleven games. The Redskins also went 0–8 in division games: their three wins comprised two against NFC West rivals and one against the Colts. This would be Norv Turner's first of seven season's coaching the Redskins.

=== Schedule ===
| Week | Date | Opponent | Result | Record | Venue | Attendance | Game recap |
|---|---|---|---|---|---|---|---|
| 1 | September 4 | Seattle Seahawks | **L** 7–28 | 0–1 | RFK Stadium | 52,930 | Recap |
| 2 | September 11 | at New Orleans Saints | **W** 38–24 | 1–1 | Louisiana Superdome | 58,049 | Recap |
| 3 | September 18 | at **New York Giants** | **L** 23–31 | 1–2 | Giants Stadium | 77,298 | Recap |
| 4 | September 25 | Atlanta Falcons | **L** 20–27 | 1–3 | RFK Stadium | 53,238 | Recap |
| 5 | October 2 | **Dallas Cowboys** | **L** 7–34 | 1–4 | RFK Stadium | 55,394 | Recap |
| 6 | October 9 | at **Philadelphia Eagles** | **L** 17–21 | 1–5 | Veterans Stadium | 63,947 | Recap |
| 7 | October 16 | **Arizona Cardinals** | **L** 16–19_{(OT)} | 1–6 | RFK Stadium | 50,019 | Recap |
| 8 | October 23 | at Indianapolis Colts | **W** 41–27 | 2–6 | RCA Dome | 57,879 | Recap |
| 9 | October 30 | **Philadelphia Eagles** | **L** 29–31 | 2–7 | RFK Stadium | 53,530 | Recap |
| 10 | November 6 | San Francisco 49ers | **L** 22–37 | 2–8 | RFK Stadium | 54,335 | Recap |
| 11 | Bye | | | | | | |
| 12 | November 20 | at **Dallas Cowboys** | **L** 7–31 | 2–9 | Texas Stadium | 64,644 | Recap |
| 13 | November 27 | New York Giants | **L** 19–21 | 2–10 | RFK Stadium | 43,384 | Recap |
| 14 | December 4 | at Tampa Bay Buccaneers | **L** 21–26 | 2–11 | Tampa Stadium | 45,121 | Recap |
| 15 | December 11 | at **Arizona Cardinals** | **L** 15–17 | 2–12 | Sun Devil Stadium | 53,790 | Recap |
| 16 | December 18 | Tampa Bay Buccaneers | **L** 14–17 | 2–13 | RFK Stadium | 47,315 | Recap |
| 17 | December 24 | at Los Angeles Rams | **W** 24–21 | 3–13 | Anaheim Stadium | 25,705 | Recap |
Note: Intra-division opponents are in **bold** text.

=== Standings ===
NFC East
| | W | L | T | PCT | PF | PA | STK |
|---|---|---|---|---|---|---|---|
| ^{(2)} Dallas Cowboys | 12 | 4 | 0 | .750 | 414 | 248 | L1 |
| New York Giants | 9 | 7 | 0 | .563 | 279 | 305 | W6 |
| Arizona Cardinals | 8 | 8 | 0 | .500 | 235 | 267 | L1 |
| Philadelphia Eagles | 7 | 9 | 0 | .438 | 308 | 308 | L7 |
| Washington Redskins | 3 | 13 | 0 | .188 | 320 | 412 | W1 |
