= List of Washington Commanders starting quarterbacks =

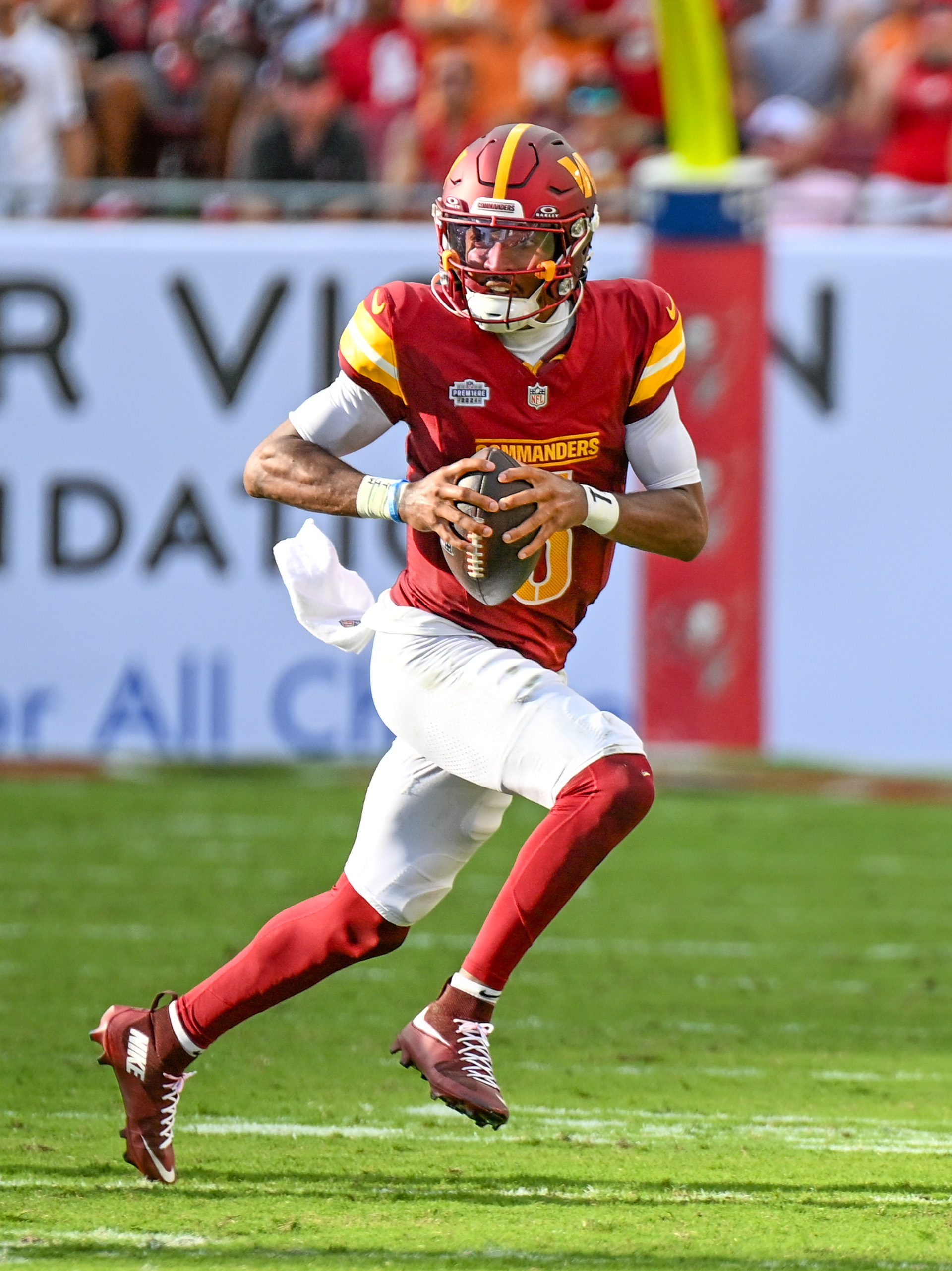
Jayden Daniels, drafted by Washington in 2024, is the team's current starting quarterback.

The Washington Commanders are a professional American football franchise based in the Washington metropolitan area. They are members of the East division in the National Football Conference (NFC) of the National Football League (NFL). The Commanders were founded in 1932 as the Boston Braves, named after the local baseball franchise. The franchise changed its name the following year to the Redskins and moved to Washington, D.C. in 1937. In 2020, the team retired the Redskins name after controversies surrounding it and briefly played as the Washington Football Team before becoming the Commanders in 2022. The team's current starting quarterback is Jayden Daniels, having started since 2024.

Since 2000, the Commanders have 27 different starting quarterbacks and only two have started entire consecutive seasons: Jason Campbell (2008–2009) and Kirk Cousins (2015–2017). Only two Washington quarterbacks have been inducted into the Pro Football Hall of Fame: Sammy Baugh (1937–1952) and Sonny Jurgensen (1964–1974).

The early era of the NFL and American football in general was not conducive to passing the football, with the forward pass not being legalized until the early 1900s and not fully adopted for many more years. Although the quarterback position has historically been the one to receive the snap and thus handle the football on every offensive play, the importance of the position during this era was limited by various rules, like having to be five yards behind the line of scrimmage before a forward pass could be attempted. These rules and the tactical focus on rushing the ball limited the importance of the quarterback position while enhancing the value of different types of backs, such as the halfback and the fullback. Some of these backs were considered triple-threat men, capable of rushing, passing or kicking the football, making it common for multiple players to attempt a pass during a game.

As rules changed and the NFL began adopting a more pass-centric approach to offensive football, the importance of the quarterback position grew. Beginning in 1950, total wins and losses by a team's starting quarterback were tracked.

== Summary by year ==
Prior to 1950, the Commanders had numerous players identified as playing the quarterback position. However, the combination of unreliable statistics in the early era of the NFL and the differences in the early quarterback position make tracking starts by quarterbacks impractical for this timeframe.

=== Regular season ===
List of Boston Braves / Boston Redskins / Washington Redskins / Washington Football Team / Washington Commanders starting quarterbacks
| Season | Quarterback(s) | Notes | Ref. |
|---|---|---|---|
| 1950 | Sammy Baugh (7) / Harry Gilmer (5) | | |
| 1951 | Sammy Baugh (9) / Harry Gilmer (3) | | |
| 1952 | Eddie LeBaron (7) / Sammy Baugh (5) | | |
| 1953 | Jack Scarbath (7) / Eddie LeBaron (5) | | |
| 1954 | Jack Scarbath (7) / Al Dorow (5) | | |
| 1955 | Eddie LeBaron (8) / Ralph Guglielmi (3) / Al Dorow (1) | | |
| 1956 | Al Dorow (7) / Eddie LeBaron (5) | | |
| 1957 | Eddie LeBaron (12) | | |
| 1958 | Eddie LeBaron (10) / Ralph Guglielmi (2) | | |
| 1959 | Eddie LeBaron (8) / Ralph Guglielmi (4) | | |
| 1960 | Ralph Guglielmi (11) / Eagle Day (1) | Guglielmi was expected to start Week 1, but he injured his right knee during the first preseason game against the San Francisco 49ers. Day started Week 1 against the Baltimore Colts, but then he was injured in the fourth quarter and M. C. Reynolds finished the game. After the Week 2 bye, Guglielmi started the remaining 11 games. | |
| 1961 (Note: In 1961, the NFL expanded its regular season schedule, which had been 12 games since 1947, to 14 games.) | Norm Snead (14) | | |
| 1962 | Norm Snead (14) | | |
| 1963 | Norm Snead (14) | | |
| 1964 | Sonny Jurgensen (14) | | |
| 1965 | Sonny Jurgensen (13) / Dick Shiner (1) | | |
| 1966 | Sonny Jurgensen (14) | | |
| 1967 | Sonny Jurgensen (14) | | |
| 1968 | Sonny Jurgensen (12) / Jim Ninowski (2) | | |
| 1969 | Sonny Jurgensen (14) | | |
| 1970 | Sonny Jurgensen (14) | | |
| 1971 | Billy Kilmer (13) / Sonny Jurgensen (1) | | |
| 1972 | Billy Kilmer (10) / Sonny Jurgensen (4) | | |
| 1973 | Billy Kilmer (10) / Sonny Jurgensen (4) | | |
| 1974 | Billy Kilmer (10) / Sonny Jurgensen (4) | | |
| 1975 | Billy Kilmer (12) / Randy Johnson (2) | | |
| 1976 | Billy Kilmer (9) / Joe Theismann (5) | | |
| 1977 | Billy Kilmer (8) / Joe Theismann (6) | | |
| 1978 (Note: In 1978, the NFL expanded its regular season schedule, which had been 14 games since 1961, to 16 games.) | Joe Theismann (14) / Billy Kilmer (2) | | |
| 1979 | Joe Theismann (16) | | |
| 1980 | Joe Theismann (15) / Mike Kruczek (1) | | |
| 1981 | Joe Theismann (16) | | |
| 1982 | Joe Theismann (9) | | |
| 1983 | Joe Theismann (16) | Named NFL MVP | |
| 1984 | Joe Theismann (16) | | |
| 1985 | Joe Theismann (11) / Jay Schroeder (5) | Thiesmann suffered a career ending injury on November 18, when he was sacked by linebacker Lawrence Taylor. As Taylor pulled Theismann down, his knee came down and drove straight into Theismann's lower right leg, fracturing both his tibia and the fibula. | |
| 1986 | Jay Schroeder (16) | | |
| 1987 | Jay Schroeder (10) / Ed Rubbert (3) / Doug Williams (2) | | |
| 1988 | Doug Williams (10) / Mark Rypien (6) | | |
| 1989 | Mark Rypien (14) / Doug Williams (2) | | |
| 1990 | Mark Rypien (10) / Stan Humphries (5) / Jeff Rutledge (1) | | |
| 1991 | Mark Rypien (16) | | |
| 1992 | Mark Rypien (16) | | |
| 1993 | Mark Rypien (10) / Rich Gannon (4) / Cary Conklin (2) | | |
| 1994 | Heath Shuler (8) / John Friesz (4) / Gus Frerotte (4) | | |
| 1995 | Gus Frerotte (11) / Heath Shuler (5) | | |
| 1996 | Gus Frerotte (16) | | |
| 1997 | Gus Frerotte (13) / Jeff Hostetler (3) | | |
| 1998 | Trent Green (14) / Gus Frerotte (2) | | |
| 1999 | Brad Johnson (16) | | |
| 2000 | Brad Johnson (11) / Jeff George (5) | | |
| 2001 | Tony Banks (14) / Jeff George (2) | | |
| 2002 | Shane Matthews (7) / Patrick Ramsey (5) / Danny Wuerffel (4) | | |
| 2003 | Patrick Ramsey (11) / Tim Hasselbeck (5) | | |
| 2004 | Mark Brunell (9) / Patrick Ramsey (7) | | |
| 2005 | Mark Brunell (15) / Patrick Ramsey (1) | | |
| 2006 | Mark Brunell (9) / Jason Campbell (7) | | |
| 2007 | Jason Campbell (13) / Todd Collins (3) | | |
| 2008 | Jason Campbell (16) | | |
| 2009 | Jason Campbell (16) | | |
| 2010 | Donovan McNabb (13) / Rex Grossman (3) | | |
| 2011 | Rex Grossman (13) / John Beck (3) | | |
| 2012 | Robert Griffin III (15) / Kirk Cousins (1) | Offensive Rookie of the Year | |
| 2013 | Robert Griffin III (13) / Kirk Cousins (3) | | |
| 2014 | Robert Griffin III (7) / Kirk Cousins (5) / Colt McCoy (4) | | |
| 2015 | Kirk Cousins (16) | Cousins was named NFL Most Improved Player. | |
| 2016 | Kirk Cousins (16) | Cousins broke the franchise record for passing yards in a season with 4,917. | |
| 2017 | Kirk Cousins (16) | | |
| 2018 | Alex Smith (10) / Josh Johnson (3) / Colt McCoy (2) / Mark Sanchez (1) | On November 19, 2018, Sanchez signed with Washington as the backup to McCoy, after starter Smith suffered a season-ending leg injury. Sanchez made his first appearance with the Redskins for an injured McCoy in a 28–13 loss to the Eagles. Sanchez became the starter after McCoy fractured his fibula in the game. In Week 14, Sanchez was benched at halftime in a 40–16 loss to the Giants in favor of Johnson. The next day, Washington named Johnson their starter for the Week 15 game against the Jaguars. | |
| 2019 | Case Keenum (8) / Dwayne Haskins (7) / Colt McCoy (1) | | |
| 2020 | Alex Smith (6) / Dwayne Haskins (6) / Kyle Allen (4) | Smith was named NFL Comeback Player of the Year. | |
| 2021 (Note: In 2021, the NFL expanded its regular season schedule, which had been 16 games since 1978, to 17 games.) | Taylor Heinicke (15) / Ryan Fitzpatrick (1) / Garrett Gilbert (1) | Fitzpatrick, signed to be the season's starter, was injured in the first half of the opening game and sat out the rest of the year. Gilbert started one game due to Heinicke testing positive for COVID-19. | |
| 2022 | Taylor Heinicke (9) / Carson Wentz (7) / Sam Howell (1) | | |
| 2023 | Sam Howell (17) | First Washington QB to not miss any starts in a season since Kirk Cousins in 2017 | |
| 2024 | Jayden Daniels (17) | Offensive Rookie of the Year. Most rushing yards in a season by a rookie quarterback in NFL history. | |
| 2025 | Marcus Mariota (8) / Jayden Daniels (7) / Josh Johnson (2) | | |
| 2026 | Jayden Daniels (2) / Marcus Mariota (1) | | |

=== Postseason ===
Postseason starters
| Season | Quarterback(s) | Notes | Ref. |
|---|---|---|---|
| 1971 | Billy Kilmer (0–1) | | |
| 1972 | Billy Kilmer (2–1) | | |
| 1973 | Billy Kilmer (0–1) | | |
| 1974 | Billy Kilmer (0–1) | | |
| 1976 | Billy Kilmer (0–1) | | |
| 1982 | Joe Theismann (4–0) | | |
| 1983 | Joe Theismann (2–1) | | |
| 1984 | Joe Theismann (0–1) | | |
| 1986 | Jay Schroeder (2–1) | | |
| 1987 | Doug Williams (3–0) | Williams led the team to Super Bowl XXII in which they routed the Denver Broncos, becoming the first black quarterback to both play in and win a Super Bowl. | |
| 1990 | Mark Rypien (1–1) | | |
| 1991 | Mark Rypien (3–0) | | |
| 1992 | Mark Rypien (1–1) | | |
| 1999 | Brad Johnson (1–1) | | |
| 2005 | Mark Brunell (1–1) | | |
| 2007 | Todd Collins (0–1) | | |
| 2012 | Robert Griffin III (0–1) | | |
| 2015 | Kirk Cousins (0–1) | | |
| 2020 | Taylor Heinicke (0–1) | | |
| 2024 | Jayden Daniels (2–1) | Led Washington to their first NFC Championship Game appearance since 1991. | |

== See also ==
- History of the Washington Commanders
- List of current NFL starting quarterbacks
