= 1996 New York Giants season =

NFL team season

- Head coach: Dan Reeves
- Home stadium: Giants Stadium

Results
- Record: 6–10
- Division place: 5th NFC East
- Playoffs: Did not qualify
- Pro Bowlers: 2: DE Michael Strahan; LB Jessie Armstead

The 1996 New York Giants season was the franchise's 72nd season in the National Football League (NFL) and their fourth and final under head coach Dan Reeves. The team was looking to improve on its 5-11 finish from the year before.

In the 1996 NFL draft, the Giants selected defensive end Cedric Jones with the fifth overall pick. The Giants' first game of the season was at home against the Buffalo Bills, and resulted in a 23–20 loss in overtime. After being shut out by the Dallas Cowboys, New York fell to 0–3 with a 31–10 defeat to the Washington Redskins. Against the New York Jets, the Giants earned their first victory of the season; a 15–10 win over the Minnesota Vikings left them with a 2–3 record heading into their bye week. The team then lost four of its next six games. After defeating the Cowboys, the Giants' record entering December stood at 5–7. They ended the season by losing three of their last four games. With a 6–10 record, the Giants finished in last place in the National Football Conference East Division. After the season, the Giants fired Reeves and hired Jim Fassel as his replacement.

Quarterback Dave Brown started all 16 games for the Giants in 1996, throwing for 12 touchdowns and 20 interceptions. New York's leading running back was Rodney Hampton, who had 254 carries for 827 yards. Wide receivers Chris Calloway and Thomas Lewis led the Giants with four touchdowns and 53 receptions each; Calloway had a team-high 739 receiving yards. Defensively, Chad Bratzke and Michael Strahan had the most sacks among Giants players with five apiece, while Jason Sehorn had five interceptions to lead the team.

== Offseason ==
=== NFL draft ===
1996 New York Giants draft
Round	Pick	Player	Position	College	Notes
1	5	Cedric Jones	DE	Oklahoma	
2	34	Amani Toomer	WR	Michigan	
3	66	Roman Oben	T	Louisville	
4	130	Danny Kanell	QB	Florida State	
6	171	Doug Colman	LB	Nebraska	
6	182	Scott Galyon	LB	Tennessee	
7	214	Conrad Hamilton	CB	Eastern New Mexico	
Made roster † Pro Football Hall of Fame * Made at least one Pro Bowl during career

== Personnel ==
=== Staff ===
1996 New York Giants staff
Head coaches: Head coach – Dan Reeves; Offensive coaches: Offensive coordinator – George Henshaw; Quarterbacks – Steve DeBerg; Running backs – George Sefcik; Wide receivers – Dick Rehbein; Tight ends – James Daniel; Offensive line – Pete Mangurian	Defensive coaches: Defensive coordinator – Mike Nolan; Defensive line – Earl Leggett; Linebackers – Don Blackmon; Defensive backs – Zaven Yaralian; Special teams coaches: Special teams – Joe DeCamillis; Strength and conditioning: Strength and conditioning – Al Miller; Asst. strength and conditioning – Kerry Goode

=== Roster ===
1996 New York Giants roster
Quarterbacks (QB): 17 Dave Brown; 13 Danny Kanell; 8 Stan White; Running backs (RB): 45 Gary Downs; 27 Rodney Hampton; 33 Robert Walker; 30 Charles Way FB; 28 Tyrone Wheatley KR; Wide receivers (WR): 86 Kevin Alexander; 80 Chris Calloway; 88 Lawrence Dawsey; 81 Thomas Lewis PR; 12 Arthur Marshall PR; Tight ends (TE): 87 Howard Cross; 85 Brian Kozlowski; 84 Aaron Pierce; 83 Brian Saxton	Offensive linemen (OL): 78 Greg Bishop T; 62 Scott Davis G; 74 Scott Gragg T; 72 Roman Oben T; 66 Jerry Reynolds T; 67 Adam Schreiber C; 61 Lance Smith G; 65 Ron Stone G; 59 Brian Williams C; 73 Rob Zatechka G; Defensive linemen (DL): 93 Ray Agnew DT; 77 Chad Bratzke DE; 95 Darnell Gilliard DT; 75 Keith Hamilton DT; 97 Robert Harris DT; 79 Bernard Holsey DT; 94 Cedric Jones DE; 92 Michael Strahan DE	Linebackers (LB): 98 Jessie Armstead OLB; 55 Marcus Buckley OLB; 58 Doug Colman MLB; 52 Scott Galyon MLB; 57 Corey Miller OLB; 91 Coleman Rudolph OLB; 90 Corey Widmer MLB; Defensive backs (DB): 37 Jesse Campbell SS; 24 Maurice Douglass CB/S; 43 Percy Ellsworth FS; 41 Conrad Hamilton CB; 23 Thomas Randolph CB; 31 Jason Sehorn CB; 22 Phillippi Sparks CB; 29 Tito Wooten FS; 47 Rodney Young SS; Special teams (ST): 3 Brad Daluiso K; 2 Mike Horan P	Practice squad: 26 Jeremy Burkett RB; 10 Olindo Mare K; Reserve: 21 Willie Beamon CB (IR); 82 Omar Douglas WR (IR); 96 Jamal Duff DE (IR); 20 Keith Elias RB (IR); 70 Ramon Okoli DT (IR); 54 Ben Talley LB (IR); 89 Amani Toomer WR (IR); Rookies in italics 53 active, 7 reserve, 2 practice squad

== Preseason ==
Week	Date	Opponent	Result	Record	Venue
1	August 2	at Jacksonville Jaguars	W 24–17	1–0	Jacksonville Municipal Stadium
2	August 10	Baltimore Ravens	L 27–37	1–1	Giants Stadium
3	August 17	at New York Jets	L 6–13	2–1	Giants Stadium
4	August 23	Carolina Panthers	L 7–34	2–2	Giants Stadium

== Regular season ==
=== Schedule ===
Week	Date	Opponent	Result	Record	Venue	Recap
1	September 1	Buffalo Bills	**L** 20–23 (OT)	0–1	Giants Stadium	Recap
2	September 8	at **Dallas Cowboys**	**L** 0–27	0–2	Texas Stadium	Recap
3	September 15	**Washington Redskins**	**L** 10–31	0–3	Giants Stadium	Recap
4	September 22	at New York Jets	**W** 13–6	1–3	Giants Stadium	Recap
5	September 29	Minnesota Vikings	**W** 15–10	2–3	Giants Stadium	Recap
6	Bye					
7	October 13	**Philadelphia Eagles**	**L** 10–19	2–4	Giants Stadium	Recap
8	October 20	at **Washington Redskins**	**L** 21–31	2–5	RFK Stadium	Recap
9	October 27	at Detroit Lions	**W** 35–7	3–5	Pontiac Silverdome	Recap
10	November 3	**Arizona Cardinals**	**W** 16–8	4–5	Giants Stadium	Recap
11	November 10	at Carolina Panthers	**L** 17–27	4–6	Ericsson Stadium	Recap
12	November 17	at **Arizona Cardinals**	**L** 23–31	4–7	Sun Devil Stadium	Recap
13	November 24	**Dallas Cowboys**	**W** 20–6	5–7	Giants Stadium	Recap
14	December 1	at **Philadelphia Eagles**	**L** 0–24	5–8	Veterans Stadium	Recap
15	December 8	at Miami Dolphins	**W** 17–7	6–8	Pro Player Stadium	Recap
16	December 15	New Orleans Saints	**L** 3–17	6–9	Giants Stadium	Recap
17	December 21	New England Patriots	**L** 22–23	6–10	Giants Stadium	Recap
Note: Intra-division opponents are in **bold** text.

=== Game summaries ===
==== Week 1: vs. Buffalo Bills ====
Week 1: Buffalo Bills at New York Giants – Game summary

Quarter	1	2	3	4	OT	Total
**Bills**	0	7	10	3	3	**23**
Giants	3	14	3	0	0	**20**

at Giants Stadium, East Rutherford, New Jersey

- Date: September 1
- Game time: 8:00 p.m. EDT
- Game weather: Cloudy, 72 °F (22 °C)
- Game attendance: 74,218
- Referee: Gary Lane
- TV announcers (TNT): Verne Lundquist, Pat Haden and Ernie Johnson

Game information

**First quarter**

- NYG – Brad Daluiso 22-yard field goal, 8:27. Giants 3–0. **Drive: 10 plays, 42 yards, 4:49.**

**Second quarter**

- NYG – Amani Toomer 87-yard punt return (Brad Daluiso kick), 10:14. Giants 10–0.
- NYG – Charles Way 37-yard pass from Dave Brown (Brad Daluiso kick), 7:27. Giants 17–0. **Drive: 4 plays, 57 yards, 1:50.**
- BUF – Thurman Thomas 1-yard run (Steve Christie kick), 3:14. Giants 17–7. **Drive: 9 plays, 60 yards, 4:13.**

**Third quarter**

- NYG – Brad Daluiso 34-yard field goal, 9:49. Giants 20–7. **Drive: 4 plays, −3 yards, 1:11.**
- BUF – Steve Christie 28-yard field goal, 6:30. Giants 20–10. **Drive: 10 plays, 70 yards, 3:19.**
- BUF – Andre Reed 60-yard pass from Jim Kelly (Steve Christie kick), 4:45. Giants 20–17. **Drive: 3 plays, 72 yards, 1:05.**

**Fourth quarter**

- BUF – Steve Christie 39-yard field goal, 7:14. Tied 20–20. **Drive: 13 plays, 54 yards, 5:00.**

**Overtime**

- BUF – Steve Christie 34-yard field goal, 4:52. Bills 23–20. **Drive: 7 plays, 17 yards, 3:49.**

**Top passers**

- BUF – Jim Kelly – 24/41, 313 yards, TD, INT
- NYG – Dave Brown – 11/27, 169 yards, TD

**Top rushers**

- BUF – Thurman Thomas – 32 rushes, 97 yards, TD
- NYG – Rodney Hampton – 18 rushes, 50 yards

**Top receivers**

- BUF – Andre Reed – 5 receptions, 138 yards, TD
- NYG – Charles Way – 4 receptions, 78 yards, TD

==== Week 2: at Dallas Cowboys ====
Week 2: New York Giants at Dallas Cowboys – Game summary

Quarter	1	2	3	4	Total
Giants	0	0	0	0	**0**
**Cowboys**	14	7	3	3	**27**

at Texas Stadium, Irving, Texas

- Date: September 8
- Game time: 4:00 p.m. EDT/3:00 p.m. CDT
- Game weather: Partly cloudy, 91 °F (33 °C)
- Game attendance: 63,069
- Referee: Ron Blum
- TV announcers (Fox): Pat Summerall and John Madden

Game information

**First quarter**

- DAL – Deion Sanders 8-yard pass from Troy Aikman (Chris Boniol kick), 8:00. Cowboys 7–0. **Drive: 5 plays, 50 yards, 2:42.**
- DAL – Kevin Williams 19-yard pass from Troy Aikman (Chris Boniol kick), 1:23. Cowboys 14–0. **Drive: 9 plays, 81 yards, 4:55.**

**Second quarter**

- DAL – Emmitt Smith 5-yard pass from Troy Aikman (Chris Boniol kick), 0:02. Cowboys 21–0. **Drive: 9 plays, 71 yards, 1:52.**

**Third quarter**

- DAL – Chris Boniol 23-yard field goal, 2:44. Cowboys 24–0. **Drive: 4 plays, 8 yards, 2:03.**

**Fourth quarter**

- DAL – Chris Boniol 29-yard field goal, 10:20. Cowboys 27–0. **Drive: 10 plays, 69 yards, 5:19.**

**Top passers**

- NYG – Dave Brown – 10/19, 55 yards, INT
- DAL – Troy Aikman – 19/27, 228 yards, 3 TD

**Top rushers**

- NYG – Rodney Hampton – 15 rushes, 44 yards
- DAL – Emmitt Smith – 24 rushes, 82 yards

**Top receivers**

- NYG – Chris Calloway – 2 receptions, 15 yards
- DAL – Kevin Williams – 6 receptions, 86 yards, TD

==== Week 3: vs. Washington Redskins ====
Week 3: Washington Redskins at New York Giants – Game summary

Quarter	1	2	3	4	Total
**Redskins**	3	14	0	14	**31**
Giants	0	7	3	0	**10**

at Giants Stadium, East Rutherford, New Jersey

- Date: September 15
- Game time: 4:00 p.m. EDT
- Game weather: Cloudy, 73 °F (23 °C)
- Game attendance: 71,693
- Referee: Tom White
- TV announcers (Fox): Pat Summerall and John Madden

Game information

**First quarter**

- WAS – Scott Blanton 36-yard field goal, 3:48. Redskins 3–0. **Drive: 11 plays, 51 yards, 5:33.**

**Second quarter**

- WAS – Marc Logan 3-yard run (Scott Blanton kick), 11:28. Redskins 10–0. **Drive: 5 plays, 47 yards, 2:52.**
- WAS – Scott Galbraith 30-yard pass from Gus Frerotte (Scott Blanton kick), 3:41. Redskins 17–0. **Drive: 7 plays, 66 yards, 3:38.**
- NYG – Aaron Pierce 7-yard pass from Dave Brown (Brad Daluiso kick), 0:56. Redskins 17–7. **Drive: 8 plays, 72 yards, 2:45.**

**Third quarter**

- NYG – Brad Daluiso 19-yard field goal, 3:50. Redskins 17–10. **Drive: 11 plays, 84 yards, 5:23.**

**Fourth quarter**

- WAS – Terry Allen 7-yard run (Scott Blanton kick), 14:56. Redskins 24–10. **Drive: 8 plays, 76 yards, 3:54.**
- WAS – Stephen Davis 39-yard run (Scott Blanton kick), 1:27. Redskins 31–10. **Drive: 11 plays, 80 yards, 3:41.**

**Top passers**

- WAS – Gus Frerotte – 15/23, 197 yards, TD, INT
- NYG – Dave Brown – 17/31, 201 yards, TD, 4 INT

**Top rushers**

- WAS – Terry Allen – 27 rushes, 146 yards, TD
- NYG – Rodney Hampton – 9 rushes, 58 yards

**Top receivers**

- WAS – Jamie Asher – 2 receptions, 49 yards
- NYG – Chris Calloway – 5 receptions, 72 yards

==== Week 4: at New York Jets ====
Week 4: New York Giants at New York Jets – Game summary

Quarter	1	2	3	4	Total
**Giants**	0	7	0	6	**13**
Jets	3	0	3	0	**6**

at Giants Stadium, East Rutherford, New Jersey

- Date: September 22
- Game time: 1:00 p.m. EDT
- Game weather: Light rain, 63 °F (17 °C)
- Game attendance: 58,339
- Referee: Johnny Grier
- TV announcers (FOX): Mike Breen and Bill Maas

Game information

**First quarter**

- NYJ – Nick Lowery 46-yard field goal, 6:09. Jets 3–0. **Drive: 10 plays, 43 yards, 6:00.**

**Second quarter**

- NYG – Chris Calloway 17-yard pass from Dave Brown (Brad Daluiso kick), 4:38. Giants 7–3. **Drive: 11 plays, 80 yards, 6:36.**

**Third quarter**

- NYJ – Nick Lowery 39-yard field goal, 7:26. Giants 7–6. **Drive: 10 plays, 32 yards, 5:14.**

**Fourth quarter**

- NYG – Brad Daluiso 20-yard field goal, 13:04. Giants 10–6. **Drive: 6 plays, 13 yards, 2:40.**
- NYG – Brad Daluiso 20-yard field goal, 4:35. Giants 13–6. **Drive: 8 plays, 58 yards, 4:37.**

**Top passers**

- NYG – Dave Brown – 9/13, 111 yards, TD
- NYJ – Neil O'Donnell – 22/38, 149 yards, INT

**Top rushers**

- NYG – Rodney Hampton – 27 rushes, 81 yards
- NYJ – Adrian Murrell – 11 rushes, 41 yards

**Top receivers**

- NYG – Chris Calloway – 3 receptions, 53 yards, TD
- NYJ – Jeff Graham – 5 receptions, 49 yards

Both New York teams were seeking to rebound from 0–3 starts to the season. The Jets got on the scoreboard first with Nick Lowery kicking a 46-yard field goal. In the second quarter, the Giants responded with Chris Calloway catching a 17-yard touchdown pass from Dave Brown. In the third quarter, the Jets cut the Giants' lead to one point thanks to a 39-yard field goal, once again coming from Lowery. The Giants increased the lead in the fourth quarter thanks to two 20-yard field goals from Brad Daluiso, helping them secure their first win of the season by a score of 13–6.

==== Week 5: vs. Minnesota Vikings ====
Week 5: Minnesota Vikings at New York Giants – Game summary

Quarter	1	2	3	4	Total
Vikings	0	7	0	3	**10**
**Giants**	3	3	6	3	**15**

at Giants Stadium, East Rutherford, New Jersey

- Date: September 29
- Game time: 1:00 p.m. EDT
- Game weather: Cloudy, 61 °F (16 °C)
- Game attendance: 70,970
- Referee: Jerry Markbreit
- TV announcers (Fox): Dick Stockton and Matt Millen

Game information

**First quarter**

- NYG – Brad Daluiso 25-yard field goal, 6:28. Giants 3–0. **Drive: 15 plays, 67 yards, 8:32.**

**Second quarter**

- MIN – David Palmer 69-yard punt return (Scott Sisson kick), 14:21. Vikings 7–3.
- NYG – Brad Daluiso 27-yard field goal, 11:56. Vikings 7–6. **Drive: 5 plays, 33 yards, 2:25.**

**Third quarter**

- NYG – Aaron Pierce 1-yard run (pass failed), 2:53. Giants 12–7. **Drive: 11 plays, 49 yards, 6:18.**

**Fourth quarter**

- MIN – Scott Sisson 28-yard field goal, 13:27. Giants 12–10. **Drive: 9 plays, 56 yards, 4:26.**
- NYG – Brad Daluiso 18-yard field goal, 7:39. Giants 15–10. **Drive: 12 plays, 70 yards, 5:48.**

**Top passers**

- MIN – Warren Moon – 13/25, 143 yards, INT
- NYG – Dave Brown – 18/29, 167 yards

**Top rushers**

- MIN – Robert Smith – 17 rushes, 86 yards
- NYG – Rodney Hampton – 24 rushes, 82 yards

**Top receivers**

- MIN – Jake Reed – 3 receptions, 60 yards
- NYG – Aaron Pierce – 3 receptions, 45 yards

==== Week 7: vs. Philadelphia Eagles ====
Week 7: Philadelphia Eagles at New York Giants – Game summary

Quarter	1	2	3	4	Total
**Eagles**	0	3	3	13	**19**
Giants	3	7	0	0	**10**

at Giants Stadium, East Rutherford, New Jersey

- Date: October 13
- Game time: 4:00 p.m. EDT
- Game weather: Partly cloudy, 62 °F (17 °C)
- Game attendance: 72,729
- Referee: Red Cashion
- TV announcers (Fox): Dick Stockton and Matt Millen

Game information

**First quarter**

- NYG – Brad Daluiso 39-yard field goal, 6:08. Giants 3–0. **Drive: 9 plays, 31 yards, 4:55.**

**Second quarter**

- PHI – Gary Anderson 39-yard field goal, 11:41. Tied 3–3. **Drive: 10 plays, 71 yards, 4:55.**
- NYG – Amani Toomer 65-yard punt return (Brad Daluiso kick), 6:42. Giants 10–3.

**Third quarter**

- PHI – Gary Anderson 46-yard field goal, 3:27. Giants 10–6. **Drive: 7 plays, 25 yards, 2:28.**

**Fourth quarter**

- PHI – Gary Anderson 45-yard field goal, 14:01. Giants 10–9. **Drive: 9 plays, 39 yards, 3:27.**
- PHI – Gary Anderson 29-yard field goal, 2:12. Eagles 12–10. **Drive: 14 plays, 68 yards, 5:53.**
- PHI – William Thomas 23-yard fumble return (Gary Anderson kick), 1:51. Eagles 19–10.

**Top passers**

- PHI – Ty Detmer – 18/33, 170 yards
- NYG – Dave Brown – 11/25, 105 yards, INT

**Top rushers**

- PHI – Ricky Watters – 27 rushes, 110 yards
- NYG – Rodney Hampton – 17 rushes, 60 yards

**Top receivers**

- PHI – Irving Fryar – 6 receptions, 73 yards
- NYG – Chris Calloway – 3 receptions, 44 yards

==== Week 8: at Washington Redskins ====
Week 8: New York Giants at Washington Redskins – Game summary

Quarter	1	2	3	4	Total
Giants	0	0	14	7	**21**
**Redskins**	7	21	0	3	**31**

at RFK Stadium, Washington, D.C.

- Date: October 20
- Game time: 1:00 p.m. EDT
- Game weather: Partly sunny, 50 °F (10 °C)
- Game attendance: 52,684
- Referee: Dick Hantak
- TV announcers (Fox): Dick Stockton and Matt Millen

Game information

**First quarter**

- WAS – Terry Allen 2-yard run (Scott Blanton kick), 10:54. Redskins 7–0. **Drive: 9 plays, 68 yards, 4:06.**

**Second quarter**

- WAS – Terry Allen 1-yard run (Scott Blanton kick), 14:14. Redskins 14–0. **Drive: 9 plays, 80 yards, 4:26.**
- WAS – Terry Allen 2-yard run (Scott Blanton kick), 3:57. Redskins 21–0. **Drive: 7 plays, 80 yards, 3:25.**
- WAS – Darrell Green 68-yard interception return (Scott Blanton kick), 3:00. Redskins 28–0.

**Third quarter**

- NYG – Thomas Lewis 31-yard pass from Dave Brown (Brad Daluiso kick), 9:40. Redskins 28–7. **Drive: 10 plays, 91 yards, 5:20.**
- NYG – Chris Calloway 13-yard pass from Dave Brown (Brad Daluiso kick), 5:39. Redskins 28–14. **Drive: 7 plays, 56 yards, 2:48.**

**Fourth quarter**

- NYG – Tyrone Wheatley 1-yard run (Brad Daluiso kick), 6:35. Redskins 28–21. **Drive: 14 plays, 80 yards, 7:48.**
- WAS – Scott Blanton 45-yard field goal, 2:33. Redskins 31–21. **Drive: 11 plays, 47 yards, 4:02.**

**Top passers**

- NYG – Dave Brown – 26/43, 298 yards, 2 TD, 2 INT
- WAS – Gus Frerotte – 14/24, 207 yards, INT

**Top rushers**

- NYG – Tyrone Wheatley – 11 rushes, 54 yards, TD
- WAS – Terry Allen – 28 rushes, 89 yards, 3 TD

**Top receivers**

- NYG – Thomas Lewis – 9 receptions, 125 yards, TD
- WAS – Henry Ellard – 5 receptions, 119 yards

==== Week 9: at Detroit Lions ====
Week 9: New York Giants at Detroit Lions – Game summary

Quarter	1	2	3	4	Total
**Giants**	2	23	0	10	**35**
Lions	7	0	0	0	**7**

at Pontiac Silverdome, Pontiac, Michigan

- Date: October 27
- Game time: 1:00 p.m. EST
- Game weather: None (indoor stadium)
- Game attendance: 63,501
- Referee: Ed Hochuli
- TV announcers (Fox): Mike Breen and Bill Maas

Game information

**First quarter**

- DET – Scott Mitchell 1-yard run (Jason Hanson kick), 11:42. Lions 7–0. **Drive: 8 plays, 40 yards, 3:18.**
- NYG – Punt blocked by Tito Wooten out of bounds in end zone for a safety, 5:53. Lions 7–2.

**Second quarter**

- NYG – Chris Calloway 24-yard pass from Tyrone Wheatley (run failed), 10:17. Giants 8–7. **Drive: 5 plays, 74 yards, 2:04.**
- NYG – Brad Daluiso 38-yard field goal, 7:59. Giants 11–7. **Drive: 4 plays, 1 yard, 1:23.**
- NYG – Maurice Douglass 32-yard interception return (Brad Daluiso kick), 6:49. Giants 18–7.
- NYG – Thomas Lewis 23-yard pass from Dave Brown (Brad Daluiso kick), 5:23. Giants 25–7. **Drive: 1 play, 23 yards, 0:07.**

**Third quarter**

- No scoring plays.

**Fourth quarter**

- NYG – Brad Daluiso 32-yard field goal, 8:36. Giants 28–7. **Drive: 6 plays, 25 yards, 3:44.**
- NYG – Ray Agnew 34-yard interception return (Brad Daluiso kick), 2:03. Giants 35–7.

**Top passers**

- NYG – Dave Brown – 15/27, 221 yards, TD, INT
- DET – Don Majkowski – 11/28, 126 yards, 2 INT

**Top rushers**

- NYG – Rodney Hampton – 27 rushes, 76 yards
- DET – Barry Sanders – 16 rushes, 47 yards

**Top receivers**

- NYG – Chris Calloway – 4 receptions, 92 yards, TD
- DET – Brett Perriman – 8 receptions, 88 yards

==== Week 10: vs. Arizona Cardinals ====
Week 10: Arizona Cardinals at New York Giants – Game summary

Quarter	1	2	3	4	Total
Cardinals	0	0	0	8	**8**
**Giants**	3	0	3	10	**16**

at Giants Stadium, East Rutherford, New Jersey

- Date: November 3
- Game time: 1:00 p.m. EST
- Game weather: Partly cloudy, 43 °F (6 °C)
- Game attendance: 68,262
- Referee: Bob McElwee
- TV announcers (Fox): Kevin Harlan and Jerry Glanville

Game information

**First quarter**

- NYG – Brad Daluiso 31-yard field goal, 9:07. Giants 3–0. **Drive: 11 plays, 62 yards, 5:53.**

**Second quarter**

- No scoring plays.

**Third quarter**

- NYG – Brad Daluiso 32-yard field goal, 2:00. Giants 6–0. **Drive: 8 plays, 33 yards, 2:58.**

**Fourth quarter**

- NYG – Thomas Lewis 24-yard pass from Danny Kanell (Brad Daluiso kick), 8:34. Giants 13–0. **Drive: 10 plays, 80 yards, 5:10.**
- NYG – Brad Daluiso 45-yard field goal, 5:30. Giants 16–0. **Drive: 4 plays, 8 yards, 1:54.**
- ARI – Frank Sanders 7-yard pass from Boomer Esiason (Boomer Esiason run), 0:40. Giants 16–8. **Drive: 15 plays, 86 yards, 2:59.**

**Top passers**

- ARI – Boomer Esiason – 20/40, 196 yards, TD, 2 INT
- NYG – Danny Kanell – 14/27, 128 yards, TD

**Top rushers**

- ARI – LeShon Johnson – 10 rushes, 29 yards
- NYG – Rodney Hampton – 24 rushes, 94 yards

**Top receivers**

- ARI – Frank Sanders – 5 receptions, 61 yards, TD
- NYG – Thomas Lewis – 7 receptions, 77 yards, TD

==== Week 11: at Carolina Panthers ====
Week 11: New York Giants at Carolina Pantherss – Game summary

Quarter	1	2	3	4	Total
Giants	14	0	3	0	**17**
**Panthers**	7	3	10	7	**27**

at Ericcson Stadium, Charlotte, North Carolina

- Date: November 10
- Game time: 8:00 p.m. EST
- Game weather: Partly cloudy, 40 °F (4 °C)
- Game attendance: 70,298
- Referee: Larry Nemmers
- TV announcers (ESPN): Mike Patrick, Joe Theismann and Mark Malone

Game information

**First quarter**

- CAR – Raghib Ismail 35-yard run (John Kasay kick), 11:25. Panthers 7–0. **Drive: 6 plays, 72 yards, 3:35.**
- NYG – Chris Calloway 13-yard pass from Dave Brown (Brad Daluiso kick), 7:16. Tied 7–7. **Drive: 8 plays, 60 yards, 4:09.**
- NYG – Thomas Lewis 23-yard pass from Dave Brown (Brad Daluiso kick), 2:05. Giants 14–7. **Drive: 5 plays, 60 yards, 2:21.**

**Second quarter**

- CAR – John Kasay 42-yard field goal, 7:28. Giants 14–10. **Drive: 7 plays, 37 yards, 2:42.**

**Third quarter**

- NYG – Brad Daluiso 22-yard field goal, 9:57. Giants 17–10. **Drive: 10 plays, 67 yards, 5:03.**
- CAR – Anthony Johnson 1-yard run (John Kasay kick), 5:26. Tied 17–17. **Drive: 6 plays, 30 yards, 2:50.**
- CAR – John Kasay 28-yard field goal, 2:49. Panthers 20–17. **Drive: 4 plays, 4 yards, 1:34.**

**Fourth quarter**

- CAR – Howard Griffith 17-yard pass from Kerry Collins (John Kasay kick), 11:36. Panthers 27–17. **Drive: 9 plays, 64 yards, 4:07.**

**Top passers**

- NYG – Dave Brown – 15/31, 223 yards, 2 TD, 3 INT
- CAR – Kerry Collins – 19/33, 202 yards, TD, INT

**Top rushers**

- NYG – Rodney Hampton – 19 rushes, 73 yards
- CAR – Anthony Johnson – 23 rushes, 67 yards, TD

**Top receivers**

- NYG – Chris Calloway – 7 receptions, 95 yards, TD
- CAR – Wesley Walls – 6 receptions, 73 yards

==== Week 12: at Arizona Cardinals ====
Week 12: New York Giants at Arizona Cardinals – Game summary

Quarter	1	2	3	4	Total
Giants	0	6	7	10	**23**
**Cardinals**	14	7	7	3	**31**

at Sun Devil Stadium, Tempe, Arizona

- Date: November 17
- Game time: 4:00 p.m. EST/2:00 p.m. MST
- Game weather: Mostly sunny, 70 °F (21 °C)
- Game attendance: 34,924
- Referee: Jerry Markbreit
- TV announcers (Fox): Kevin Harlan and Jerry Glanville

Game information

**First quarter**

- ARI – Rob Moore 18-yard pass from Boomer Esiason (Kevin Butler kick), 9:27. Cardinals 7–0. **Drive: 3 plays, 38 yards, 1:17.**
- ARI – Cedric Smith 1-yard run (Kevin Butler kick), 5:56. Cardinals 14–0. **Drive: 4 plays, 55 yards, 2:02.**

**Second quarter**

- NYG – Brad Daluiso 25-yard field goal, 14:27. Cardinals 14–3. **Drive: 11 plays, 57 yards, 6:29.**
- ARI – Frank Sanders 2-yard pass from Boomer Esiason (Kevin Butler kick), 10:36. Cardinals 21–3. **Drive: 9 plays, 82 yards, 3:51.**
- NYG – Brad Daluiso 22-yard field goal, 1:56. Cardinals 21–6. **Drive: 16 plays, 88 yards, 8:40.**

**Third quarter**

- NYG – Tyrone Wheatley 4-yard pass from Dave Brown (Brad Daluiso kick), 6:33. Cardinals 21–13. **Drive: 4 plays, 14 yards, 1:32.**
- ARI – LeShon Johnson 1-yard run (Kevin Butler kick), 0:38. Cardinals 28–13. **Drive: 12 plays, 75 yards, 5:55.**

**Fourth quarter**

- NYG – Tyrone Wheatley 9-yard pass from Dave Brown (Brad Daluiso kick), 9:56. Cardinals 28–20. **Drive: 4 plays, 42 yards, 0:55.**
- ARI – Kevin Butler 18-yard field goal, 4:26. Cardinals 31–20. **Drive: 4 plays, 5 yards, 2:47.**
- NYG – Brad Daluiso 27-yard field goal, 1:25. Cardinals 31–23. **Drive: 16 plays, 59 yards, 3:01.**

**Top passers**

- NYG – Dave Brown – 22/41, 262 yards, 2 TD, 2 INT
- ARI – Boomer Esiason – 18/27, 260 yards, 2 TD, INT

**Top rushers**

- NYG – Tyrone Wheatley – 13 rushes, 50 yards
- ARI – LeShon Johnson – 17 rushes, 48 yards, TD

**Top receivers**

- NYG – Chris Calloway – 6 receptions, 95 yards
- ARI – LeShon Johnson – 2 receptions, 50 yards

==== Week 13: vs. Dallas Cowboys ====
Week 13: Dallas Cowboys at New York Giants – Game summary

Quarter	1	2	3	4	Total
Cowboys	3	0	0	3	**6**
**Giants**	0	13	0	7	**20**

at Giants Stadium, East Rutherford, New Jersey

- Date: November 24
- Game time: 4:00 p.m. EST
- Game weather: Overcast, 44 °F (7 °C)
- Game attendance: 77,081
- Referee: Tom White
- TV announcers (Fox): Dick Stockton and Matt Millen

Game information

**First quarter**

- DAL – Chris Boniol 31-yard field goal, 4:30. Cowboys 3–0. **Drive: 13 plays, 85 yards, 7:31.**

**Second quarter**

- NYG – Brad Daluiso 45-yard field goal, 10:28. Tied 3–3. **Drive: 10 plays, 39 yards, 4:47.**
- NYG – Brad Daluiso 46-yard field goal, 4:57. Giants 6–3. **Drive: 6 plays, 24 yards, 3:12.**
- NYG – Tito Wooten 54-yard fumble return (Brad Daluiso kick), 1:53. Giants 13–3.

**Third quarter**

- No scoring plays.

**Fourth quarter**

- DAL – Chris Boniol 37-yard field goal, 11:43. Giants 13–6. **Drive: 9 plays, 30 yards, 3:24.**
- NYG – Brian Kozlowski 4-yard pass from Dave Brown (Brad Daluiso kick), 6:01. Giants 20–6. **Drive: 10 plays, 57 yards, 5:42.**

**Top passers**

- DAL – Troy Aikman – 28/39, 280 yards, 2 INT
- NYG – Dave Brown – 12/18, 110 yards, TD, INT

**Top rushers**

- DAL – Emmitt Smith – 11 rushes, 18 yards
- NYG – Tyrone Wheatley – 21 rushes, 69 yards

**Top receivers**

- DAL – Michael Irvin – 6 receptions, 77 yards
- NYG – Chris Calloway – 4 receptions, 48 yards

==== Week 14: at Philadelphia Eagles ====
Week 14: New York Giants at Philadelphia Eagles – Game summary

Quarter	1	2	3	4	Total
Giants	0	0	0	0	**0**
**Eagles**	10	14	0	0	**24**

at Veterans Stadium, Philadelphia, Pennsylvania

- Date: December 1
- Game time: 1:00 p.m. EST
- Game weather: Rain, 60 °F (16 °C)
- Game attendance: 51,468
- Referee: Howard Roe
- TV announcers (Fox): Kevin Harlan and Jerry Glanville

Game information

**First quarter**

- PHI – Gary Anderson 44-yard field goal, 8:07. Eagles 3–0. **Drive: 4 plays, 8 yards, 1:36.**
- PHI – Jason Dunn 14-yard pass from Ty Detmer (Gary Anderson kick), 2:46. Eagles 10–0. **Drive: 6 plays, 77 yards, 3:24.**

**Second quarter**

- PHI – Irving Fryar 19-yard pass from Ty Detmer (Gary Anderson kick), 12:51. Eagles 17–0. **Drive: 2 plays, 14 yards, 0:45.**
- PHI – Chris Jones 2-yard pass from Ty Detmer (Gary Anderson kick), 0:28. Eagles 24–0. **Drive: 15 plays, 80 yards, 7:57.**

**Third quarter**

- No scoring plays.

**Fourth quarter**

- No scoring plays.

**Top passers**

- NYG – Danny Kanell – 4/13, 47 yards
- PHI – Ty Detmer – 25/33, 284 yards, 3 TD, INT

**Top rushers**

- NYG – Tyrone Wheatley – 9 rushes, 39 yards
- PHI – Ricky Watters – 29 rushes, 104 yards

**Top receivers**

- NYG – Chris Calloway – 2 receptions, 26 yards
- PHI – Ricky Watters – 6 receptions, 77 yards

==== Week 15: at Miami Dolphins ====
Week 15: New York Giants at Miami Dolphins – Game summary

Quarter	1	2	3	4	Total
**Giants**	7	7	3	0	**17**
Dolphins	7	0	0	0	**7**

at Pro Player Stadium, Miami Gardens, Florida

- Date: December 8
- Game time: 1:00 p.m. EST
- Game weather: Mostly sunny, 73 °F (23 °C)
- Game attendance: 63,889
- Referee: Bernie Kukar
- TV announcers (Fox): Dick Stockton and Matt Millen

Game information

**First quarter**

- NYG – Rodney Hampton 4-yard run (Brad Daluiso kick), 8:52. Giants 7–0. **Drive: 13 plays, 80 yards, 6:08.**
- MIA – Robert Wilson 3-yard pass from Dan Marino (Joe Nedney kick), 0:36. Tied 7–7. **Drive: 6 plays, 80 yards, 2:42.**

**Second quarter**

- NYG – Howard Cross 1-yard pass from Dave Brown (Brad Daluiso kick), 1:15. Giants 14–7. **Drive: 16 plays, 78 yards, 9:13.**

**Third quarter**

- NYG – Brad Daluiso 37-yard field goal, 1:38. Giants 17–7. **Drive: 7 plays, 13 yards, 2:49.**

**Fourth quarter**

- No scoring plays.

**Top passers**

- NYG – Dave Brown – 21/28, 169 yards, TD
- MIA – Dan Marino – 16/30, 209 yards, TD, 2 INT

**Top rushers**

- NYG – Rodney Hampton – 20 rushes, 60 yards, TD
- MIA – Karim Abdul-Jabbar – 17 rushes, 96 yards

**Top receivers**

- NYG – Charles Way – 6 receptions, 56 yards
- MIA – Fred Barnett – 4 receptions, 139 yards

==== Week 16: vs. New Orleans Saints ====
Week 16: New Orleans Saints at New York Giants – Game summary

Quarter	1	2	3	4	Total
**Saints**	0	7	0	10	**17**
Giants	0	0	3	0	**3**

at Giants Stadium, East Rutherford, New Jersey

- Date: December 15
- Game time: 1:00 p.m. EST
- Game weather: Light rain, 42 °F (6 °C)
- Game attendance: 52,530
- Referee: Johnny Grier
- TV announcers (Fox): Dick Stockton and Matt Millen

Game information

**First quarter**

- No scoring plays.

**Second quarter**

- NO – Lorenzo Neal 1-yard run (Doug Brien kick), 10:23. Saints 7–0. **Drive: 8 plays, 52 yards, 4:32.**

**Third quarter**

- NYG – Brad Daluiso 30-yard field goal, 8:10. Saints 7–3. **Drive: 4 plays, −3 yards, 1:22.**

**Fourth quarter**

- NO – Doug Brien 51-yard field goal, 8:59. Saints 10–3. **Drive: 7 plays, 34 yards, 3:57.**
- NO – Mario Bates 22-yard run (Doug Brien kick), 3:47. Saints 17–3. **Drive: 6 plays, 63 yards, 3:26.**

**Top passers**

- NO – Jim Everett – 12/22, 106 yards, INT
- NYG – Danny Kanell – 5/20, 52 yards, INT

**Top rushers**

- NO – Mario Bates – 32 rushes, 129 yards, TD
- NYG – Gary Downs – 7 rushes, 42 yards

**Top receivers**

- NO – Earnest Hunter – 3 receptions, 35 yards
- NYG – Lawrence Dawsey – 2 receptions, 29 yards

==== Week 17: vs. New England Patriots ====
Week 17: New England Patriots at New York Giants – Game summary

Quarter	1	2	3	4	Total
**Patriots**	0	0	3	20	**23**
Giants	2	20	0	0	**22**

at Giants Stadium, East Rutherford, New Jersey

- Date: December 21
- Game time: 12:30 p.m. EST
- Game weather: Mostly sunny, 24 °F (−4 °C)
- Game attendance: 65,387
- Referee: Walt Coleman
- TV announcers (NBC): Dick Enberg, Paul Maguire, Phil Simms and Jim Gray

Game information

**First quarter**

- NYG – Intentional grounding penalty on Drew Bledsoe enforced in end zone for a safety, 0:10. Giants 2–0.

**Second quarter**

- NYG – Charles Way 1-yard run (Brad Daluiso kick), 12:28. Giants 9–0. **Drive: 6 plays, 44 yards, 2:42.**
- NYG – Brad Daluiso 30-yard field goal, 6:27. Giants 12–0. **Drive: 9 plays, 54 yards, 4:07.**
- NYG – Brad Daluiso 27-yard field goal, 3:00. Giants 15–0. **Drive: 7 plays, 43 yards, 2:40.**
- NYG – Jason Sehorn 23-yard interception return (Brad Daluiso kick), 2:45. Giants 22–0.

**Third quarter**

- NE – Adam Vinatieri 40-yard field goal, 4:12. Giants 22–3. **Drive: 10 plays, 71 yards, 5:04.**

**Fourth quarter**

- NE – Terry Glenn 26-yard pass from Drew Bledsoe (Adam Vinatieri kick), 12:20. Patriots 22–10. **Drive: 10 plays, 88 yards, 4:04.**
- NE – Dave Meggett 60-yard punt return (Adam Vinatieri kick), 11:09. Giants 22–17.
- NE – Ben Coates 13-yard pass from Drew Bledsoe (pass failed), 1:23. Patriots 23–22. **Drive: 13 plays, 75 yards, 5:45.**

**Top passers**

- NE – Drew Bledsoe – 31/47, 301 yards, 2 TD, 2 INT
- NYG – Dave Brown – 14/34, 215 yards, INT

**Top rushers**

- NE – Dave Meggett – 7 rushes, 20 yards
- NYG – Gary Downs – 22 rushes, 52 yards

**Top receivers**

- NE – Terry Glenn – 8 receptions, 124 yards, TD
- NYG – Thomas Lewis – 5 receptions, 84 yards

=== Standings ===
NFC East
	W	L	T	PCT	PF	PA	STK
^{(3)} Dallas Cowboys	10	6	0	.625	286	250	L1
^{(5)} Philadelphia Eagles	10	6	0	.625	363	341	W2
Washington Redskins	9	7	0	.563	364	312	W1
Arizona Cardinals	7	9	0	.438	300	397	L1
New York Giants	6	10	0	.375	242	297	L2

== See also ==
- List of New York Giants seasons
