= Eric Sutton =

American football player (born 1972)

Profile
- Position: Cornerback

Personal information
- Born: October 24, 1972 (age 54); Torrance, California, U.S.
- Listed height: 5 ft 10 in (1.78 m)
- Listed weight: 170 lb (77 kg)

Career information
- College: San Diego State

Career history
- 1995–1996: Washington Redskins
- 1997: Philadelphia Eagles*
- 1997–1998: Saskatchewan Roughriders
- 1999: Oakland Raiders*
- 1999: Saskatchewan Roughriders
- 1999–2000: Calgary Stampeders
- * Offseason or practice squad member only
- Stats at Pro Football Reference

Eric Dontay Sutton (born October 24, 1972) is a former professional gridiron football defensive back in the National Football League (NFL) for the Washington Redskins and in the Canadian Football League (CFL) for the Saskatchewan Roughriders and Calgary Stampeders. He was also a member of the Philadelphia Eagles (NFL) and Oakland Raiders (NFL).

== College career ==
Sutton played college football for the San Diego State Aztecs from 1991 to 1994.

== Professional career ==
=== National Football League ===
Sutton signed with the Washington Redskins as an undrafted free agent in 1995 and spent the 1995 season on the practice roster. He played in four games in 1996 while also spending time on the practice roster.

=== Philadelphia Eagles ===
Sutton signed with the Philadelphia Eagles in 1997, but was released at the end of training camp.

=== Saskatchewan Roughriders ===
Sutton signed with the Saskatchewan Roughriders in September, 1997 where he played and started in six regular season games at cornerback and recorded 18 defensive tackles and two interceptions. He also played in three post-season games, including the 85th Grey Cup where he had three defensive tackles in the loss to the Toronto Argonauts. In 1998, he started all 18 regular season games where he had 53 defensive tackles and one interception.

=== Oakland Raiders ===
In 1999, Sutton was signed by the Oakland Raiders, but was released and did not play for the team.

=== Saskatchewan Roughriders (II) ===
Sutton re-joined the Saskatchewan Roughriders in 1999 where he started in three games and recorded eight defensive tackles. However, he was released on July 29, 1999.

=== Calgary Stampeders ===
On August 16, 1999, Sutton signed a practice roster agreement with the Calgary Stampeders. Over the 1999 and 2000 seasons, he played in 18 regular season games where he had 31 defensive tackles and 11 special teams tackles.

== Personal life ==
Sutton's son, also named Eric, was born in Regina, Saskatchewan while Sutton played for the Saskatchewan Roughriders. His son also plays professional football as a defensive back in the Canadian Football League. Following his retirement from his football career, Sutton worked for Walmart as an Asset Protection Manager.
