= Isaiah Oliver =

American football player (born 1996)

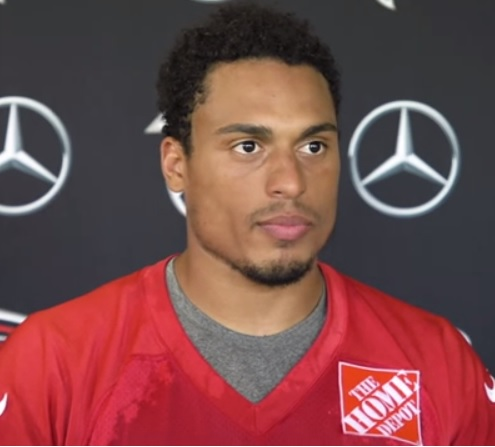
- Isaiah Oliver in 2018 Falcons' minicamp.

No. 28 – Tennessee Titans
- Position: Cornerback
- Roster status: Active

Personal information
- Born: September 30, 1996 (age 30); Phoenix, Arizona, U.S.
- Listed height: 6 ft 0 in (1.83 m)
- Listed weight: 210 lb (95 kg)

Career information
- High school: Brophy College Preparatory (Phoenix)
- College: Colorado (2015–2017)
- NFL draft: 2018: 2nd round, 58th overall pick

Career history
- Atlanta Falcons (2018–2022); San Francisco 49ers (2023); New York Jets (2024–2025); Arizona Cardinals (2026)*; Tennessee Titans (2026–present)
- * Offseason or practice squad member only

Awards and highlights
- First-team All-Pac-12 (2017)

Career NFL statistics as of Week 5, 2026
- Total tackles: 386
- Sacks: 3.0
- Forced fumbles: 3
- Fumble recoveries: 2
- Pass deflections: 42
- Interceptions: 3
- Stats at Pro Football Reference

Isaiah Oliver (born September 30, 1996) is an American professional football cornerback for the Tennessee Titans of the National Football League (NFL). He played college football for the Colorado Buffaloes, and was selected by the Atlanta Falcons in the second round of the 2018 NFL draft.

== Early life ==
Oliver attended Brophy College Preparatory in Phoenix. He played both wide receiver and cornerback on the high school football team. Coming out of high school, he was a three-star recruit according to ESPN.com. He committed to Colorado to play college football over offers from Arizona and New Mexico. Oliver also ran track in high school, posting a personal best time of 10.56 seconds in the 100 meter dash.

== College career ==
Oliver played at Colorado from 2015 to 2017. During his collegiate career, he had 82 total tackles and three interceptions. After his junior season in 2017, Oliver decided to forgo his senior year and enter the 2018 NFL draft. Oliver was also a member of Colorado's track and field team.

== Professional career ==
External videos
- NFL Prospect Profile: Isaiah Oliver

Pre-draft measurables
Height	Weight	Arm length	Hand span	Wingspan	40-yard dash	10-yard split	20-yard split
6 ft 0 1/4 in (1.84 m)	201 lb (91 kg)	33 1/2 in (0.85 m)	9 3/4 in (0.25 m)	6 ft 8 5/8 in (2.05 m)	4.50 s	1.55 s	2.65 s
All values from NFL Combine

=== Atlanta Falcons ===
The Atlanta Falcons selected Oliver in the second round (58th overall) of the 2018 NFL Draft. Oliver was the eighth cornerback drafted in 2018.

On May 9, 2018, the Falcons signed Oliver to a four-year, $4.63 million contract that includes $2.14 million guaranteed and a signing bonus of $1.45 million. Oliver recorded his first career interception during Week 16 against the Carolina Panthers.

In Week 2 of the 2019 season against the Philadelphia Eagles, Oliver recorded 6 tackles in the 24–20 win. On fourth and 8 with one minute left in the game, Oliver tackled tight end Zach Ertz just short of the first down marker, sealing a Falcons win. In Week 8 of the 2020 season against the Carolina Panthers on Thursday Night Football, Oliver recorded his first career sack on Teddy Bridgewater during the 25–17 Falcons' victory.

Oliver entered the 2021 season as a Falcons starting cornerback. He suffered a knee injury in Week 4 and was placed on injured reserve on October 5, 2021. On March 18, 2022, Oliver signed a one-year contract extension with the Falcons. He was placed on injured reserve on September 1, 2022. He was activated on October 15.

=== San Francisco 49ers ===
On March 15, 2023, Oliver signed a two-year deal with the San Francisco 49ers. He played in 17 games with six starts, recording 67 tackles, two passes defensed and one interception.

On February 23, 2024, Oliver was released by the 49ers.

=== New York Jets ===
Oliver signed with the New York Jets on March 11, 2024. He was named the third cornerback on the depth chart behind Sauce Gardner and D. J. Reed. Oliver played in all 17 games, including seven starts, and recorded 57 tackles, one sack, and three passes defended.

Oliver signed a one-year contract extension with the Jets on March 17, 2025. He made 14 appearances (two starts) for New York, recording three pass deflections and 55 combined tackles. On December 15, Oliver was placed on season-ending injured reserve due to a knee injury suffered in Week 15 against the Jacksonville Jaguars.

=== Arizona Cardinals ===
On June 4, 2026, Oliver signed with the Arizona Cardinals. He was released by the Cardinals as a part of final roster cuts on August 30.

=== Tennessee Titans ===
On September 7, 2026, Oliver was signed to the Tennessee Titans' practice squad. He was promoted to the active roster on November 14.

== Personal life ==
Oliver's father, Muhammad, played in the NFL. His uncle, Damon Mays, also played in the NFL.

== NFL career statistics ==
Legend
**Bold**	Career high

=== Regular season ===
Year	Team	Games		Tackles				Fumbles			Interceptions			
Year	Team	GP	GS	Comb	Total	Ast	Sack	FF	FR	Yds	INT	Yds	TD	PD
2018	ATL	14	2	23	20	3	0.0	0	0	0	**1**	0	0	7
2019	ATL	**16**	**16**	62	50	12	0.0	**1**	0	0	0	0	0	**11**
2020	ATL	**16**	12	**70**	**51**	**19**	**1.0**	**1**	0	0	0	0	0	6
2021	ATL	4	3	11	7	4	0.0	**1**	**1**	**2**	0	0	0	3
2022	ATL	12	5	37	25	12	**1.0**	0	0	0	**1**	**27**	0	7
2023	SF	17	6	67	48	**19**	0.0	0	**1**	0	**1**	3	0	2
2024	NYJ	17	7	57	42	15	1.0	0	0	0	0	0	0	3
2025	NYJ	14	2	55	29	26	0.0	0	0	0	0	0	0	3
2026	TEN	1	0	4	2	2	0.0	0	0	0	0	0	0	0
Career		111	53	386	274	112	3.0	3	2	2	3	30	0	42
