= Dexter Nottage =

Bahamian gridiron football player (born 1970)

No. 92, 94, 90
- Position: Defensive end

Personal information
- Born: November 14, 1970 (age 55); Nassau, Bahamas
- Listed height: 6 ft 4 in (1.93 m)
- Listed weight: 287 lb (130 kg)

Career information
- High school: Hollywood Hills (Hollywood, Florida, U.S.)
- College: Florida A&M
- NFL draft: 1994: 6th round, 163rd overall pick

Career history
- Washington Redskins (1994–1996); Kansas City Chiefs (1997); Green Bay Packers (1998)*; Toronto Argonauts (1998)
- * Offseason or practice squad member only

Career NFL statistics
- Tackles: 71
- Sacks: 6
- Fumble recoveries: 3
- Stats at Pro Football Reference

Dexter Alexander Nottage (born November 14, 1970) is a Bahamian former professional American football defensive end in the National Football League (NFL) for the Washington Redskins and Kansas City Chiefs. He played college football at Florida A&M University and was selected in the sixth round of the 1994 NFL draft. He played high school football at Hollywood Hills High School.

== NFL career statistics ==
Legend
**Bold**	Career high

Year	Team	Games		Tackles				Interceptions				Fumbles			
Year	Team	GP	GS	Comb	Solo	Ast	Sck	Int	Yds	TD	Lng	FF	FR	Yds	TD
1994	WAS	15	1	21	17	4	1.0	0	0	0	0	0	0	0	0
1995	WAS	16	0	21	17	4	0.0	0	0	0	0	**1**	**3**	0	0
1996	WAS	16	4	**29**	**24**	**5**	**5.0**	0	0	0	0	0	0	0	0
1997	KAN	1	0	0	0	0	0.0	0	0	0	0	0	0	0	0
		48	5	71	58	13	6.0	0	0	0	0	1	3	0	0
