= Brian Thure =

American football player (born 1973)

No. 74
- Position: Offensive tackle

Personal information
- Born: September 3, 1973 (age 53); Downey, California, U.S.
- Listed height: 6 ft 5 in (1.96 m)
- Listed weight: 300 lb (136 kg)

Career information
- High school: Salinas (Salinas, California)
- College: California
- NFL draft: 1995: 6th round, 176th overall pick

Career history
- Washington Redskins (1995–1996)

Career NFL statistics
- Games played: 4
- Stats at Pro Football Reference

Brian Douglas Thure (born September 3, 1973) is an American former professional football player who was an offensive tackle for the Washington Redskins of the National Football League (NFL). He played college football for the California Golden Bears and was the 176th overall pick in the sixth round of the 1995 NFL draft.

On October 29, 1996, Thure, Cory Raymer, and 1 other were injured in a car crash in Colonial Beach, Virginia. Raymer was driving when an oncoming vehicle caused him to swerve and overturn his car. Raymer and Thure were taken to Mary Washington Hospital by ambulance.

In June of 2026, Taylor Fresh Foods filed a federal lawsuit against Thure. He was recorded admitting to misappropriation of company funds. The suit claims US$32 Million was siphoned off for Thure's personal use, including a Hawaii mansion and a 400-acre ranch estate in California, while he was head of their Tennessee division.
