= Scott Galbraith =

American football player (born 1967)

No. 81, 89, 47
- Position: Tight end

Personal information
- Born: January 7, 1967 (age 59); Sacramento, California, U.S.
- Listed height: 6 ft 2 in (1.88 m)
- Listed weight: 258 lb (117 kg)

Career information
- High school: North Highlands (CA)
- College: USC
- NFL draft: 1990: 7th round, 178th overall pick

Career history
- Cleveland Browns (1990–1992); Dallas Cowboys (1993–1994); Washington Redskins (1995–1996); Dallas Cowboys (1997); Green Bay Packers (1998)

Awards and highlights
- Super Bowl champion (XXVIII); Third-team All-American (1988); 2× First-team All-Pac-10 (1988, 1989)

Career NFL statistics
- Receptions: 60
- Receiving yards: 670
- Touchdowns: 6
- Stats at Pro Football Reference

Alan Scott Galbraith (born January 7, 1967) is an American former professional football player who was a tight end in the National Football League (NFL) for the Cleveland Browns, Dallas Cowboys, Washington Redskins, and Green Bay Packers. He was part of the Super Bowl XXVIII championship team over the Buffalo Bills. He played college football for the USC Trojans.

== Early life ==
Galbraith attended Highlands High School in North Highlands, California. As a senior tight end, he posted 34 receptions and 6 touchdowns at tight end, while leading the team in tackles, while also starting on the defensive line. He received All-Northern California honors.

In basketball, he averaged 16 points per game and received league MVP honors as a senior.

== College career ==
Galbraith accepted a football scholarship from the University of Southern California. As a redshirt freshman, he was the third-string tight end behind Erik McKee and Paul Green. As a sophomore, with the graduation of tight end, he was a backup behind Green.

As a junior, he became a starter after replacing an injured Green, registering 21 receptions for 311 yards and 2 touchdowns.

As a senior, he earned his second consecutive All-Pac-10 honors and was a part of the 1990 Rose Bowl winning team. He finished his college career with 51 receptions for 571 yards and 5 touchdowns.

== Professional career ==
=== Cleveland Browns ===
Galbraith was selected by the Cleveland Browns in the seventh round (178th overall) of the 1990 NFL draft. As a rookie, he was third on the team with 10 special teams tackles. In 1991, he became a regular starter (13 starts) in two tight end formations.

In 1992, he missed the first 2 games in a contract holdout and was relegated to a backup role after the team signed free agent Mark Bavaro. He was waived on August 31, 1993, after Brian Kinchen and Clarence Williams passed him on the depth chart.

=== Dallas Cowboys (first stint) ===
On November 11, 1993, he was signed as a free agent by the Dallas Cowboys to replace injured tight ends Jim Price and Alfredo Roberts. He was used as a blocking tight end, helping Emmitt Smith win a third consecutive rushing title with 283 carries for 1,486 yards. He also played on special teams. He was a part of the Super Bowl XXVIII championship team.

During his time with the team, he was mainly used as a backup to Jay Novacek and as a blocker.

=== Washington Redskins ===
On May 16, 1995, he signed as a free agent with the Washington Redskins. He started all 16 games and was used mainly as blocking tight end, helping Terry Allen rush for 1,309 yards and 10 touchdowns. Galbraith registered 10 receptions for 80 yards and 2 touchdowns.

In 1996, he started only 6 games, after being passed on the depth chart by Jamie Asher and James Jenkins. He was released on June 4, 1997.

=== Dallas Cowboys (second stint) ===
On July 18, 1997, he was signed as a free agent by the Dallas Cowboys to provide depth as the third-string tight end, after the retirement of Jay Novacek and the release of Kendell Watkins. He wasn't re-signed after the season.

=== Green Bay Packers ===
On December 23, 1998, he was signed by the Green Bay Packers to provide depth at tight end after Mark Chmura suffered a pulled right calf muscle. He wasn't re-signed after the season.

== Personal life ==
Galbraith is currently the Chaplain of the Sacramento Kings. He is a fourth generation preacher in the Church of God in Christ (COGIC), and son of Bishop Albert Galbraith, chairman of the Board of Bishops of the Church of God in Christ from 2021 to 2024.
