= Patrise Alexander =

American football player (born 1972)

No. 58, 33
- Position: Linebacker

Personal information
- Born: October 23, 1972 (age 54); Galveston, Texas, U.S.
- Listed height: 6 ft 1 in (1.85 m)
- Listed weight: 250 lb (113 kg)

Career information
- High school: Galveston (TX) Ball
- College: Louisiana-Lafayette
- NFL draft: 1995: undrafted

Career history
- Washington Redskins (1995–1998); Philadelphia Eagles (1999)*; Orlando Rage (2001); Dallas Desperados (2002–2003); Austin Wranglers (2004)
- * Offseason or practice squad member only

Career NFL statistics
- Tackles: 17
- Stats at Pro Football Reference

Career AFL statistics
- Tackles: 54
- Sacks: 1
- Rushing yards: 115
- Rushing touchdowns: 17
- Stats at ArenaFan.com

Liyongo Patrise Alexander (born October 23, 1972) is an American former professional football linebacker in the National Football League (NFL) for the Washington Redskins. He played college football at the University of Southwestern Louisiana.
