= Tydus Winans =

American football player (born 1972)

No. 83, 85
- Position: Wide receiver

Personal information
- Born: July 26, 1972 (age 54); Los Angeles, California, U.S.
- Listed height: 5 ft 11 in (1.80 m)
- Listed weight: 177 lb (80 kg)

Career information
- High school: Carson (CA)
- College: Fresno State
- NFL draft: 1994: 3rd round, 68th overall pick

Career history
- Washington Redskins (1994–1995); Cincinnati Bengals (1996); Kansas City Chiefs (1997)*; Saskatchewan Roughriders (1997); San Francisco Demons (2001)
- * Offseason or practice squad member only

Career NFL statistics
- Receptions: 23
- Receiving yards: 421
- Receiving touchdowns: 2
- Stats at Pro Football Reference

Tydus Oran Winans (born July 26, 1972) is an American former professional football player who was a wide receiver in the National Football League (NFL) for the Washington Redskins and the Cincinnati Bengals. He played college football at Fresno State University. He was selected by Washington in the third round of the 1994 NFL draft with the 68th overall pick.

== Early life ==
Winans attended Carson High School in Carson, California and a letterman in high school football. In football, as a senior, he was named as a second-team All-South Bay selection by the Los Angeles Times.
