= Muhammad Oliver =

American football player (born 1969)

No. 42, 26, 25, 20
- Position: Cornerback

Personal information
- Born: March 12, 1969 (age 57); Brooklyn, New York, U.S.
- Listed height: 5 ft 11 in (1.80 m)
- Listed weight: 184 lb (83 kg)

Career information
- High school: North (Phoenix, Arizona)
- College: Oregon
- NFL draft: 1992: 9th round, 249th overall pick

Career history
- Denver Broncos (1992); Kansas City Chiefs (1993); Green Bay Packers (1993); Miami Dolphins (1993–1994); Washington Redskins (1995–1996); Arizona Rattlers (1998–2001)

Career NFL statistics
- Interceptions: 1
- Stats at Pro Football Reference

Muhammad Ramadan Oliver (born March 12, 1969) is an American former professional football player who was a cornerback in the National Football League (NFL) for the Denver Broncos, Green Bay Packers, Kansas City Chiefs, Miami Dolphins and Washington Redskins. He was selected 249th overall by the Broncos in the ninth round of the 1992 NFL draft. He played college football for the Oregon Ducks.

Oliver is a former decathlete, who set his personal best score (8087 points) on June 6, 1992, at the NCAA championships in Austin, Texas.

His son, Isaiah Oliver, played college football for the Colorado Buffaloes and now plays in the NFL for the New York Jets.
