= Jamie Asher =

American football player (born 1972)

No. 84
- Position: Tight end

Personal information
- Born: October 31, 1972 (age 54); Indianapolis, Indiana, U.S.
- Listed height: 6 ft 3 in (1.91 m)
- Listed weight: 245 lb (111 kg)

Career information
- High school: Warren Central (Indianapolis)
- College: Louisville
- NFL draft: 1995: 5th round, 137th overall pick

Career history
- Washington Redskins (1995–1998); Philadelphia Eagles (1999)

Awards and highlights
- First-team All-American (1994)

Career NFL statistics
- Receptions: 133
- Receiving yards: 1,421
- Receiving touchdowns: 5
- Stats at Pro Football Reference

James Allen Asher (born October 31, 1972) is an American former professional football player who was a tight end for the Washington Redskins and Philadelphia Eagles of the National Football League (NFL). He played high school football at Warren Central High School in Indianapolis. He played college football for the Louisville Cardinals, earning first-team All-American honors in 1994. He was selected in the fifth round of the 1995 NFL draft with the 137th overall pick.

== NFL career statistics ==
Legend
	Led the league
**Bold**	Career high

Year	Team	Games		Receiving				
Year	Team	GP	GS	Rec	Yds	Avg	Lng	TD
1995	WAS	7	2	14	172	**12.3**	20	0
1996	WAS	16	12	42	**481**	11.5	**34**	**4**
1997	WAS	16	13	**49**	474	9.7	24	1
1998	WAS	9	7	28	294	10.5	28	0
Career		48	34	133	1,421	10.7	34	5
