= Gus Frerotte =

American football player (born 1971)

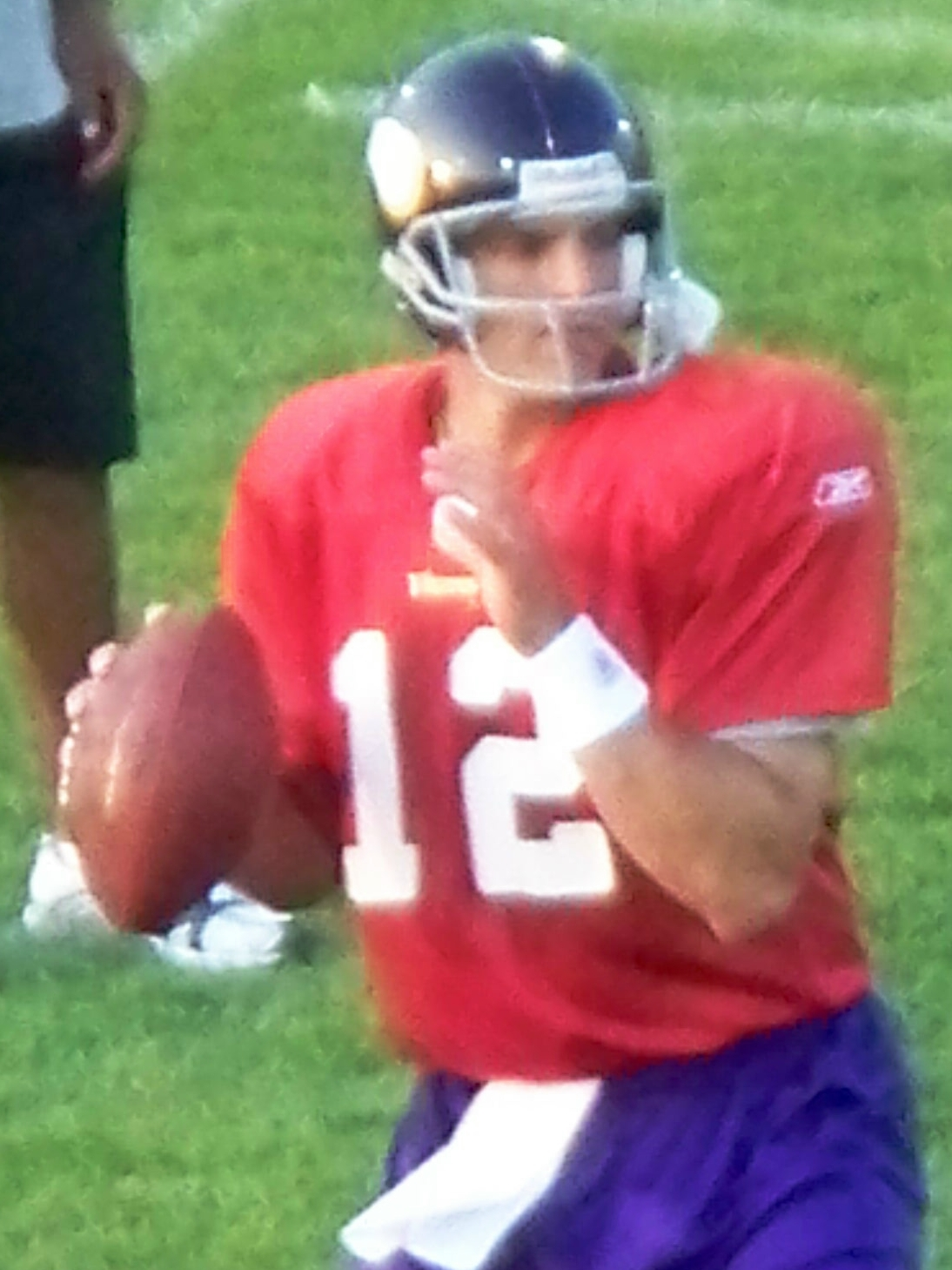
- Frerotte with the Minnesota Vikings in 2008

No. 12, 11
- Position: Quarterback

Personal information
- Born: July 31, 1971 (age 55); Ford Cliff, Pennsylvania, U.S.
- Listed height: 6 ft 3 in (1.91 m)
- Listed weight: 233 lb (106 kg)

Career information
- High school: Ford City (PA)
- College: Tulsa (1989–1993)
- NFL draft: 1994: 7th round, 197th overall pick

Career history
- Washington Redskins (1994–1998); Detroit Lions (1999); Denver Broncos (2000–2001); Cincinnati Bengals (2002); Minnesota Vikings (2003–2004); Miami Dolphins (2005); St. Louis Rams (2006–2007); Minnesota Vikings (2008)

Awards and highlights
- Pro Bowl (1996); NFL record: Longest touchdown pass: 99 yards (tied)

Career NFL statistics
- Passing attempts: 3,106
- Passing completions: 1,699
- Completion percentage: 54.7%
- TD–INT: 114–106
- Passing yards: 21,291
- Passer rating: 74.2
- Stats at Pro Football Reference

Gustave Joseph Frerotte (/fəˈrɒt/; born July 31, 1971) is an American former professional football player who was a quarterback in the National Football League (NFL). He was selected by the Washington Redskins in the seventh round of the 1994 NFL draft. He played college football at Tulsa.

Frerotte was selected to the 1997 Pro Bowl while with the Redskins. He also played for the Detroit Lions, Denver Broncos, Cincinnati Bengals, Miami Dolphins, Minnesota Vikings, and St. Louis Rams.

== Early life ==
Frerotte attended Ford City High School in Ford City, Pennsylvania, a suburb of Pittsburgh. In high school, he was a letterman in football, basketball, and baseball. Frerotte graduated in 1989.

He played with Denny Harriger on the school's baseball team in 1987 and helped lead the team to a Pennsylvania Interscholastic Athletic Association state championship in 1987. He was later named to the Ford City Hall of Fame.

Frerotte is the cousin of Mitch Frerotte, a guard who played for the Buffalo Bills during the 1990s.

== College career ==
At the University of Tulsa, he started eight games as a redshirt freshman in 1990 after quarterback T. J. Rubley was injured, starting his first career game at Oklahoma. He finished his college career as the school's second-ranked all-time passer at the time, behind Rubley. During his collegiate career, he threw for 5,480 yards and 32 touchdowns on 432-of-860 passing. His 2,871 passing yards as a senior were the most by a Tulsa quarterback in 28 years. As a sophomore, Frerotte also handled punting duties for the team and averaged 35.5 yards per punt.

As an undergraduate, he joined the Pi Kappa Alpha fraternity.

== Professional career ==
Pre-draft measurables
Height	Weight	Arm length	Hand span	40-yard dash	10-yard split	20-yard split	20-yard shuttle	Vertical jump
6 ft 3 in (1.91 m)	221 lb (100 kg)	30 7/8 in (0.78 m)	9 1/2 in (0.24 m)	5.04 s	1.74 s	2.88 s	4.79 s	26.0 in (0.66 m)
All values from NFL Combine

=== Washington Redskins ===
Frerotte was selected in the seventh round of the 1994 NFL draft with the 197th overall pick by the Washington Redskins; earlier in the same draft, the Redskins had selected Heath Shuler with their first-round pick (third overall). Frerotte was not even the backup quarterback in the first game of the 1994 season, which saw John Friesz have most of the snaps besides Shuler. In the eighth week of the season, due to Shuler's sprained ankle injury, Frerotte became the starter for the game versus the Indianapolis Colts as decided by head coach Norv Turner. He went 17-of-32 for 226 yards with two touchdowns as Washington won 41–27. He started the next three games (each losses) before being inactive the rest of the year. Shuler was nabbed as the starter for the 1995 season but Frerotte would take over not long after, starting 11 games.

During his Pro Bowl season in 1996, Frerotte passed for 3,453 yards (6th best in NFL and his career high), also ranking 9th in pass completions, finishing the year completing 270 of 470 passes. Frerotte also ranked 3rd in the league in average yards per pass completion (12.3). Frerotte had led the league in that category the season before (13.8 yards per completion), his first as a steady starter (16 games, 11 starts), finishing that year with 199 completions in 396 attempts for 2,751 yards with 13 touchdowns and 13 interceptions.

In November 1997, Frerotte sprained his neck by ramming his head into a padded cement wall during a touchdown celebration in a 7–7 tie against the New York Giants on ESPN Sunday Night Football. Frerotte's season would end after breaking his hip against St. Louis in the Week 13 game on November 30, 1997. Turner stated a need for "consistency [and] accuracy" after the 1997 season that was not helped by a slow start in training camp the following year. Frerotte started the opening game of the 1998 season and went 8-of-12 for 93 yards with a touchdown and two interceptions while suffering a sore shoulder before being benched by Turner for Trent Green. He did not play for the next four games before being put in against Philadelphia for over a dozen passes. He then started against the Vikings and went 10-of-26 for 117 yards with an interception before being benched again for Green. He never saw the field for Washington again.

=== Detroit Lions ===
In 1999, he played for the Detroit Lions, where he backed up Charlie Batch. Frerotte wound up starting for the Lions in the playoffs while Batch was out with injuries; the Lions lost in the Wild Card round to the Redskins, Frerotte's former team, 27–13.

The 1999 season statistically was one of Frerotte's best, a 60.2% completion percentage (4th best in NFL) and an 83.6 passer rating (9th best in NFL and best of Frerotte's career when starting six or more games). He also finished in the NFL Top 10 for Highest Average Yards per Pass Attempt at 6.88 (9th in NFL) and Passing Yards per Game at 235.2 (8th in NFL). Frerotte's best game of the season came vs Chicago (November 25, 1999), completing a career best (up to this point) 29 completions for 309 yards with two touchdowns and no interceptions, a key role in a narrow 21–17 win. The following week Frerotte again played well, this time facing his former team, helping Detroit beat Washington 33–17 completing 21 of 32 passes for 280 yards with one touchdown and no interceptions. Frerotte established a then career high 375 yards, completing 24 of 39 passes again with two touchdowns and no interceptions in a losing effort vs Arizona on November 14, 1999.

=== Denver Broncos ===
In 2000, Gus was a backup for the Denver Broncos. After Brian Griese was injured, he led the Broncos to the playoffs. The team lost in the opening round to the eventual Super Bowl champion Baltimore Ravens. He remained the Broncos' backup until the 2001 NFL season was over.

Playing in 10 games (6 starts) subbing for the injured Griese, Frerotte led Denver to four wins in his six starts, finishing the season with a 59.8% completion percentage (2nd best of career in a season with 6 or more starts), passing for 1,776 yards with nine touchdowns and eight interceptions. Frerotte finished 4th in the league in Average Yards Per Pass Completion (12.9) and 10th in Average Yards Per Pass Attempt (6.88).

Among his more notable performances, Frerotte quarterbacked a wild 38–37 win over division rival San Diego on November 19, overcoming 4 interceptions and a lost fumble by passing for a career-high 462 yards and 5 touchdowns. He was far more efficient in wins over New Orleans on December 3, 2000 (11 completions in 16 attempts for 201 yards, one touchdown and zero interceptions) and in the regular season finale vs San Francisco on December 23, 2000 (18 completions in 29 attempts for 205 yards, one touchdown and zero interceptions). At one stretch Denver scored at least 38 points in three consecutive games with Frerotte starting at quarterback (November 19, 2000 vs San Diego, November 25, 2000, vs Seattle, December 3, 2000, vs New Orleans).

=== Cincinnati Bengals ===
He joined the Cincinnati Bengals in 2002, winning the starting job before losing the position after three games to Jon Kitna under the soon-to-be-fired coach Dick LeBeau.

=== 2003–2007: Vikings, Dolphins, and Rams ===
In 2003 and 2004, Frerotte backed up Daunte Culpepper for the Minnesota Vikings, and served as the team's holder on field goals. He won both games as a temporary starter for the team in 2003.

Frerotte earned the Miami Dolphins starting job in 2005. He started 15 games, guiding the Dolphins to a 9–6 record, throwing for 18 touchdowns and 13 interceptions, completing 52% of his passes and finished the season with a 71.9 quarterback rating. He then joined the St. Louis Rams as backup to Marc Bulger. St. Louis cut Frerotte after two seasons with the team on February 28, 2008.

=== Second stint with Vikings ===
On April 1, 2008, he returned to the Vikings, signing a two-year, $3.75 million deal. He was Tarvaris Jackson's backup for the first two games of the year. On September 17, 2008, he was named the starter for the rest of the 2008 season by head coach Brad Childress. Frerotte led the Vikings to an 8–3 record before suffering a back injury, which reinstated Jackson as the starter.

On November 30, 2008, Frerotte tied the NFL record for the longest pass from scrimmage by throwing a 99-yard touchdown pass to Bernard Berrian against the Chicago Bears.

Frerotte had expressed interest in being the starting quarterback for the Vikings for the 2009 NFL season, but was released on February 27, 2009, after the team traded for quarterback Sage Rosenfels. The Vikings ultimately signed Brett Favre to be their starter.

== After retirement ==
By December 2010, Frerotte was working for GAIMPlan Consulting which helps high school athletes select a college. On January 19, 2011, Frerotte announced he would be taking over as head coach at John Burroughs School in the St. Louis, Missouri, area. His teams were runners up in the state championship game in 2011 and 2012. In 2017, Frerotte joined Coraopolis, Pennsylvania-based startup RC21X as the Vice President of Brain Health Initiatives. The company developed a cloud-based tool to monitor brain performance. Frerotte also serves as a brand ambassador for the firm.

== NFL career statistics ==
Year	Team	GP	Passing							
Year	Team	GP	Cmp	Att	Pct	Yds	Avg	TD	Int	Rtg
1994	WAS	4	46	100	46.0	600	6.0	5	5	61.3
1995	WAS	16	199	396	50.3	2,751	6.9	13	13	70.2
1996	WAS	16	270	470	57.4	3,453	7.3	12	11	79.3
1997	WAS	13	204	402	50.7	2,682	6.7	17	12	73.8
1998	WAS	3	25	54	46.3	283	5.2	1	3	45.5
1999	DET	9	175	288	60.8	2,117	7.3	9	7	83.6
2000	DEN	10	138	232	59.5	1,776	7.7	9	8	82.1
2001	DEN	4	30	48	62.5	308	6.4	3	0	101.7
2002	CIN	4	44	85	51.8	437	5.1	1	5	46.1
2003	MIN	16	38	65	58.5	690	10.6	7	2	118.1
2004	MIN	16	0	1	0.0	0	0.0	0	0	39.6
2005	MIA	16	257	494	52.0	2,996	6.1	18	13	71.9
2006	STL	1	1	3	33.3	27	9.0	0	0	67.4
2007	STL	8	94	167	56.3	1,014	6.1	7	12	58.3
2008	MIN	11	178	301	59.1	2,157	7.2	12	15	73.7
Career		147	1,699	3,106	54.7	21,291	6.9	114	106	74.2
