= List of Washington Commanders first-round draft picks =

The Washington Commanders are a professional American football franchise based in the Washington metropolitan area. They are members of the East division in the National Football Conference (NFC) of the National Football League (NFL). The Commanders were founded in 1932 as the Boston Braves, named after the local baseball franchise. The franchise changed its name the following year to the Redskins and moved to Washington, D.C. in 1937. In 2020, the team retired the Redskins name after longstanding controversies surrounding it and briefly played as the Washington Football Team before becoming the Commanders in 2022. Washington's first draft selection was Riley Smith, a blocking back from Alabama, in 1936.

Washington have selected a draft's first overall pick twice: Harry Gilmer in 1948 and Ernie Davis in 1962. Five eventual Hall of Famers were selected by Washington in the first round: Champ Bailey, Sammy Baugh, Darrell Green, Art Monk, and Charley Taylor. Three first-round picks by the team have been named NFL Rookie of the Year: halfback Charley Taylor in 1964, quarterback Robert Griffin III in 2012 and defensive end Chase Young in 2020. Two Washington first-round draft picks have died during their active careers. The first was Davis, who was traded shortly after the selection to the Cleveland Browns for Bobby Mitchell and Leroy Jackson and died from leukemia before ever playing in an NFL game. The other was Sean Taylor, who the team selected fifth overall in 2004 and was fatally shot at home while rehabbing from an injury in November 2007.

== Player selections ==
Pro Football Hall of Famer

List of Washington Redskins / Commanders first-round draft picks
Draft	Pick	Player	Position	College	Notes	Refs
1936	2	Riley Smith	FB	Alabama	(Note: The first player ever selected in the NFL draft, Heisman Trophy winner Jay Berwanger in 1936, chose not to play in the NFL, thus making Smith the first drafted player to play.)	
1937	6	Sammy Baugh	QB	TCU		
1938	9	Andy Farkas	FB	Detroit		
1939	8	I. B. Hale	T	TCU		
1940	8	Ed Boell	QB	New York		
1941	10	Forest Evashevski	QB	Michigan		
1942	6	Spec Sanders	RB	Texas		
1943	10	Jack Jenkins	FB	Vanderbilt		
1944	8	Mike Micka	FB	Colgate		
1945	8	Jim Hardy	QB	USC		
1946	9	Cal Rossi	RB	UCLA		
1947	4	Cal Rossi	RB	UCLA		
1948	1	Harry Gilmer	QB	Alabama	(Note: The Redskins' first pick in 1948 was a lottery bonus pick.)	
1948	4	Lowell Tew	FB	Alabama		
1949	8	Rob Goode	RB	Texas A&M		
1950	6	George Thomas	RB	Oklahoma		
1951	4	Leon Heath	FB	Oklahoma		
1952	7	Larry Isbell	QB	Baylor		
1953	3	Jack Scarbath	QB	Maryland		
1954	8	Steve Meilinger	WR	Kentucky		
1955	4	Ralph Guglielmi	QB	Notre Dame		
1956	12	Ed Vereb	RB	Maryland		
1957	9	Don Bosseler	FB	Miami (FL)		
1958	No Pick				(Note: The Redskins' first pick in 1958 was traded to the Los Angeles Rams for Rudy Bukich.)	
1959	4	Don Allard	QB	Boston College		
1960	4	Richie Lucas	QB	Penn State	(Note: Opted to sign with the Buffalo Bills of the newly formed American Football League)	
1961	2	Norm Snead	QB	Wake Forest		
1961	3	Joe Rutgens	DT	Illinois		
1962	1	Ernie Davis	RB	Syracuse		
1963	7	Pat Richter	TE	Wisconsin		
1964	3	Charley Taylor	WR	Arizona State		
1965	No Pick				(Note: The Redskins' first pick in 1965 was traded to the Chicago Bears for Angelo Coia and Fred Williams.)	
1966	6	Charlie Gogolak	K	Princeton		
1967	13	Ray McDonald	RB	Idaho		
1968	12	Jim Smith	DB	Oregon		
1969	No Pick				(Note: The Redskins' first pick in 1969 was traded to the Los Angeles Rams for the rights to Gary Beban.)	
1970	No Pick				(Note: The Redskins' first pick in 1970 was traded to the San Francisco 49ers in 1968 for Walt Rock.)	
1971	No Pick				(Note: The Redskins' traded their first and third round picks in 1971, their fourth, fifth, and sixth round picks in 1972, and Marlin McKeever to the Los Angeles Rams for Maxie Baughan, Jack Pardee, Myron Pottios, Jeff Jordan, John Wilbur, and Diron Talbert, along with a fifth round pick in 1971.)	
1972	No Pick				(Note: The Redskins' first pick in 1972 was traded to the New York Jets for Verlon Biggs.)	
1973	No Pick				(Note: The Redskins' first pick in 1973 was traded to the Baltimore Colts, along with Cotton Speyrer, for Roy Jefferson and a ninth round pick in 1973 and 1974. The pick was then traded to the San Diego Chargers.)	
1974	No Pick				(Note: The Los Angeles Rams traded Richie Petitbon to the Redskins for a 1973 sixth round pick, and their 1974 first round pick (revised from 1973 second round pick after Redskins learned they had previously traded 1973 second round pick). The Rams then traded the first round pick to the Chicago Bears.)	
1975	No Pick				(Note: The Redskins' first pick in 1975, along with a second round pick in 1976, was traded to the San Diego Chargers for Duane Thomas.)	
1976	No Pick				(Note: The Redskins' first pick in 1976 was traded to the Miami Dolphins for Joe Theismann.)	
1977	No Pick				(Note: The Redskins' first picks in 1977 and 1978 were traded to the St. Louis Cardinals, along with a second-round pick in 1979, for Dave Butz.)	
1978	No Pick					
1979	No Pick				(Note: The Redskins' first pick in 1979 was traded to the Cincinnati Bengals for Lemar Parrish and Coy Bacon.)	
1980	18	Art Monk	WR	Syracuse		
1981	20	Mark May	T	Pittsburgh		
1982	No Pick				(Note: The Los Angeles Rams traded their 1981 third round pick (#69-Russ Grimm), two 1981 fifth round picks (#117-Byron Braggs and #132-Gary Sayre), and a 1982 second round pick (#49-Vernon Dean) to the Redskins for their first pick in 1982.)	
1983	28	Darrell Green	CB	Texas A&I		
1984	No Pick				(Note: The Redskins' first pick in 1984 was traded to the New York Giants for a second-round pick and third-round pick.)	
1985	No Pick				(Note: The Redskins' first pick in 1985 was traded to the New Orleans Saints for George Rogers, and fifth, tenth, and eleventh round picks in 1985.)	
1986	No Pick				(Note: The Redskins' first pick in 1986 was traded to the Atlanta Falcons before the 1985 Draft, along with a second round pick in 1985, for a second round pick in 1985 and 1986.)	
1987	No Pick				(Note: The San Francisco 49ers traded their 1986 second round pick (#45-Walter Murray) to the Redskins for a 1986 tenth round pick (#270-Harold Hallman) and their 1987 first round pick.)	
1988	No Pick				(Note: The Redskins' first round picks in 1988 and 1989 were traded to the Chicago Bears, as compensation for Wilber Marshall.)	
1989	No Pick					
1990	No Pick				(Note: The Redskins' first pick in 1990 was traded to the Atlanta Falcons before the 1989 Draft, along with a second round pick in 1989, for Gerald Riggs.)	
1991	17	Bobby Wilson	DT	Michigan State	(Note: The Redskins acquired their first pick in 1991 from the Houston Oilers via the New England Patriots and the Dallas Cowboys.)	
1992	4	Desmond Howard	WR	Michigan		
1993	19	Tom Carter	DB	Notre Dame		
1994	3	Heath Shuler	QB	Tennessee		
1995	4	Michael Westbrook	WR	Colorado		
1996	30	Andre Johnson	T	Penn State		
1997	17	Kenard Lang	DE	Miami(FL)		
1998	No Pick				(Note: The Redskins' first pick in 1998 was traded to the Cincinnati Bengals, along with a third-round pick in 1998, as compensation for Dan Wilkinson.)	
1999	7	Champ Bailey	CB	Georgia		
2000	2	LaVar Arrington	LB	Penn State		
2000	3	Chris Samuels	T	Alabama		
2001	15	Rod Gardner	WR	Clemson		
2002	32	Patrick Ramsey	QB	Tulane		
2003	No Pick				(Note: The Redskins' first pick in 2003 was traded to the New York Jets for Laveranues Coles. The pick was eventually traded to the New England Patriots.)	
2004	5	Sean Taylor	FS	Miami(FL)		
2005	9	Carlos Rogers	CB	Auburn		
2005	25	Jason Campbell	QB	Auburn		
2006	No Pick				(Note: The Redskins' first pick in 2006 was traded to the San Francisco 49ers via the Denver Broncos. It was part of the 2005 Draft transaction between Washington and Denver. See citation above.)	
2007	6	LaRon Landry	SS	LSU		
2008	No Pick				(Note: The Atlanta Falcons traded two 2008 second round picks (#34-Devin Thomas and #48-Fred Davis), and a 2008 fourth round pick (which was then traded to the Tennessee Titans who drafted William Hayes) to the Redskins for their 2008 first round pick (21st overall–Sam Baker), a 2008 third round pick (#84-Harry Douglas), and a 2008 fifth round pick (#154-Kroy Biermann).)	
2009	13	Brian Orakpo	OLB	Texas		
2010	4	Trent Williams	T	Oklahoma		
2011	16	Ryan Kerrigan	OLB	Purdue		
2012	2	Robert Griffin III	QB	Baylor		
2013	No Pick					
2014	No Pick					
2015	5	Brandon Scherff	G	Iowa		
2016	22	Josh Doctson	WR	TCU		
2017	17	Jonathan Allen	DT	Alabama		
2018	13	Daron Payne	DT	Alabama		
2019	15	Dwayne Haskins	QB	Ohio State		
2019	26	Montez Sweat	DE	Mississippi State		
2020	2	Chase Young	DE	Ohio State		
2021	19	Jamin Davis	LB	Kentucky		
2022	16	Jahan Dotson	WR	Penn State		
2023	16	Emmanuel Forbes	CB	Mississippi State		
2024	2	Jayden Daniels	QB	LSU		
2025	29	Josh Conerly Jr.	T	Oregon		
2026	7	Sonny Styles	LB	Ohio State		
