= Rich Owens =

American football player (born 1972)

No. 96, 97, 67
- Position: Defensive end

Personal information
- Born: May 22, 1972 (age 54); Philadelphia, Pennsylvania, U.S.
- Listed height: 6 ft 6 in (1.98 m)
- Listed weight: 287 lb (130 kg)

Career information
- High school: Lincoln (Philadelphia)
- College: Lehigh
- NFL draft: 1995: 5th round, 152nd overall pick

Career history
- Washington Redskins (1995–1998); Miami Dolphins (1999–2000); Kansas City Chiefs (2001–2002); Seattle Seahawks (2002)

Career NFL statistics
- Tackles: 212
- Sacks: 28.5
- Forced fumbles: 7
- Stats at Pro Football Reference

Ritchie Darryl Owens (born May 22, 1972) is an American former professional football player who was a defensive lineman in the National Football League (NFL) for the Washington Redskins, Miami Dolphins, Kansas City Chiefs and Seattle Seahawks. He played college football for the Lehigh Mountain Hawks and was selected in the fifth round of the 1995 NFL draft.
