= Sterling Palmer =

American football player (born 1971)

No. 97, 75, 96
- Position: Defensive end

Personal information
- Born: February 4, 1971 (age 55); Fort Lauderdale, Florida, U.S.
- Listed height: 6 ft 5 in (1.96 m)
- Listed weight: 287 lb (130 kg)

Career information
- High school: St. Thomas Aquinas (Fort Lauderdale)
- College: Florida State
- NFL draft: 1993: 4th round, 101st overall pick

Career history
- Washington Redskins (1993–1996); New England Patriots (1999)*; Houston Marshals (2000); Orlando Rage (2001); Chicago Enforcers (2001)
- * Offseason or practice squad member only

Career NFL statistics
- Tackles: 146
- Sacks: 11
- Forced fumbles: 3
- Stats at Pro Football Reference

Sterling Lanard Palmer (born February 4, 1971) is an American former professional football player who was a defensive end in the National Football League (NFL) for the Washington Redskins. He played college football for the Florida State Seminoles and was selected in the fourth round of the 1993 NFL draft.

Pre-draft measurables
Height	Weight	Arm length	Hand span
6 ft 5 7/8 in (1.98 m)	268 lb (122 kg)	34 3/4 in (0.88 m)	10 1/8 in (0.26 m)
