= Ken Harvey (American football) =

American football player (born 1965)

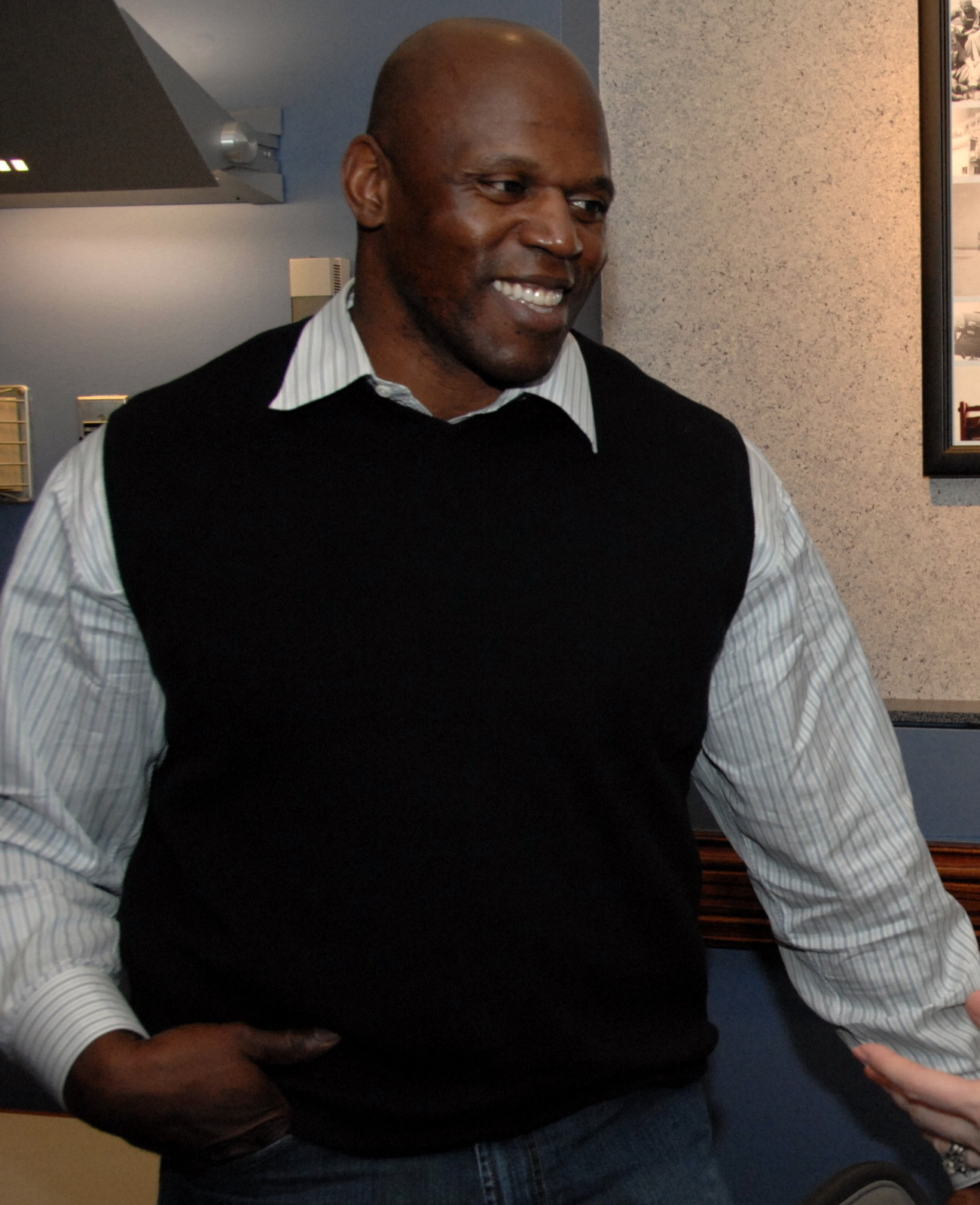
- Harvey in 2011

No. 56, 57
- Position: Linebacker

Personal information
- Born: May 6, 1965 (age 61); Austin, Texas, U.S.
- Listed height: 6 ft 3 in (1.91 m)
- Listed weight: 230 lb (104 kg)

Career information
- High school: Lanier (Austin)
- College: California
- NFL draft: 1988: 1st round, 12th overall pick

Career history
- Phoenix Cardinals (1988–1993); Washington Redskins (1994–1998)

Awards and highlights
- 2× Second-team All-Pro (1994, 1995); 4× Pro Bowl (1994–1997); 80 Greatest Redskins; Washington Commanders Ring of Fame; First-team All-Pac-10 (1987)

Career NFL statistics
- Games played: 164
- Tackles: 828
- Sacks: 89
- Fumbles recovered: 11
- Interceptions: 1
- Safeties: 1
- Stats at Pro Football Reference

Kenneth Ray Harvey (born May 6, 1965) is an American former professional football player who was a linebacker in the National Football League (NFL). He played college football for the California Golden Bears. After his playing career, he became a fitness trainer for space tourists and a sports writer for The Washington Post.

== Football career ==
Harvey played professional football in the National Football League as an outside linebacker for the Phoenix Cardinals and the Washington Redskins from 1988 to 1998. He played collegiately at the University of California, Berkeley and was selected by the Cardinals in the first round (12th overall) in the 1988 NFL draft. Harvey was a four-time Pro Bowl selection from 1994 to 1997. In his career, he appeared in 164 games and recorded 89 sacks.

== Sports writer ==
Harvey began providing video commentary for the website of The Washington Post. His video column is titled Word on the Street with Ken Harvey. The formula for his videos is to interview Washington Redskins fans after each game. In addition to his videos he contributes to the online text column titled At The Game.

Harvey also began writing a weekly sports column about the Redskins in October 2011 for the Joint Base Journal, a publication produced by the Joint Base Anacostia-Bolling Public Affairs office.

== Children's book author ==
Harvey has written several children's books, among them The Leftover Games, When Chocolate Milk Moved In, and The Fridge Games. He also wrote a book in 2019 called Come Find Me, that was illustrated by actor, and former teammate, Terry Crews.

== Of interest ==
Former president of the Washington Redskins Alumni Association.
