= Joe Patton (American football) =

American football player (1972–2022)

No. 68
- Positions: Tackle, guard

Personal information
- Born: January 15, 1972; Birmingham, Alabama, U.S.
- Died: September 13, 2022 (aged 50); Hesperia, California, U.S.
- Listed height: 6 ft 5 in (1.96 m)
- Listed weight: 306 lb (139 kg)

Career information
- College: Alabama A&M
- NFL draft: 1994: 3rd round, 97th overall pick

Career history
- Washington Redskins (1994–1998); Jacksonville Jaguars (2000)*; San Diego Chargers (2000)*
- * Offseason or practice squad member only

Career NFL statistics
- Games played: 61
- Games started: 54
- Fumble recoveries: 3
- Stats at Pro Football Reference

Joseph Cephus Patton IV (January 5, 1972 – September 13, 2022) was an American professional football tackle in the National Football League (NFL) for the Washington Redskins. He played college football at Alabama A&M University and was selected in the third round of the 1994 NFL draft.
