= Ed Simmons =

American football player (born 1963)

No. 76
- Position: Offensive tackle

Personal information
- Born: December 31, 1963 (age 62); Seattle, Washington, U.S.
- Listed height: 6 ft 5 in (1.96 m)
- Listed weight: 334 lb (151 kg)

Career information
- High school: Nathan Hale (Seattle)
- College: Eastern Washington
- NFL draft: 1987: 6th round, 164th overall pick

Career history
- Washington Redskins (1987–1997); St. Louis Rams (1998)*
- * Offseason or practice squad member only

Awards and highlights
- 2× Super Bowl champion (XXII, XXVI); 70 Greatest Redskins (2002); Eastern Washington University Athletics Hall of Fame (1996)

Career NFL statistics
- Games played: 142
- Games started: 104
- Fumble recoveries: 3
- Stats at Pro Football Reference

Edward Lamar Simmons (born December 31, 1963) is an American former professional football player who spent his entire 11-year career as an offensive tackle for the Washington Redskins of the National Football League (NFL) from 1987 to 1997. He played college football for the Eastern Washington Eagles and was selected in the sixth round of the 1987 NFL draft.

Pre-draft measurables
Height	Weight	Arm length	Hand span	40-yard dash	10-yard split	20-yard split	20-yard shuttle	Vertical jump	Broad jump	Bench press
6 ft 4 1/8 in (1.93 m)	292 lb (132 kg)	34 1/4 in (0.87 m)	9 in (0.23 m)	5.33 s	1.80 s	3.10 s	4.90 s	26.5 in (0.67 m)	8 ft 6 in (2.59 m)	24 reps
All values from NFL Combine
