= Ron Lynn =

American football coach

Personal information
- Born: December 6, 1944 (age 81); Youngstown, Ohio, U.S.

Career information
- College: Mount Union

Career history

Coaching
- Toledo (1966) Graduate assistant; Mount Union (1967–1973) Secondary coach; Kent State (1974–1976) Secondary coach; San Jose State (1977–1978) Secondary coach; Pacific (1979) Secondary coach; California (1980) Secondary coach; California (1981–1982) Defensive coordinator; Oakland Invaders (1983–1985) Defensive coordinator; San Diego Chargers (1986–1991) Defensive coordinator; Cincinnati Bengals (1992–1993) Defensive coordinator; Washington Redskins (1994–1996) Defensive coordinator; New England Patriots (1997–1999) Secondaries coach; Oakland Raiders (2000–2003) Secondaries coach; San Francisco 49ers (2004) Secondaries coach; Stanford (2008–2009) Assistant head coach/co-defensive coordinator

Operations
- Stanford (2010–2014) Director of player development
- Coaching profile at Pro Football Reference

Ronald William Lynn (born December 6, 1944) is an American former football coach and executive. He served as defensive coordinator for Stanford from 2008 to 2009, and was a defensive coordinator in the National Football League (NFL) for 11 seasons from 1986 to 1996. His coordinating stints were with the San Diego Chargers (1986–91), Cincinnati Bengals (1992–93), and Washington Redskins (1994–96).
