= Scott Blanton =

American football player (born 1973)

No. 16
- Position: Placekicker

Personal information
- Born: April 1, 1973 (age 53); Norman, Oklahoma, U.S.
- Listed height: 6 ft 2 in (1.88 m)
- Listed weight: 221 lb (100 kg)

Career information
- High school: Norman
- College: Oklahoma
- NFL draft: 1995: undrafted

Career history
- Washington Redskins (1995–1998)

Awards and highlights
- First-team All-Big Eight (1994); Second-team All-Big Eight (1992)

Career NFL statistics
- Field goals made: 44
- Field goal attempts: 60
- Field goal %: 73.3
- Longest field goal: 53
- Stats at Pro Football Reference

Robert Scott Blanton (born July 1, 1973) is an American former professional football player who was a kicker for the Washington Redskins of the National Football League (NFL). He played college football for the Oklahoma Sooners.
