= Darryl Morrison =

American football player (born 1971)

No. 37, 38
- Position: Safety

Personal information
- Born: May 19, 1971 (age 55); Phoenix, Arizona, U.S.
- Listed height: 5 ft 11 in (1.80 m)
- Listed weight: 196 lb (89 kg)

Career information
- High school: Central (Phoenix)
- College: Arizona
- NFL draft: 1993: 6th round, 155th overall pick

Career history
- Washington Redskins (1993–1996)

Career NFL statistics
- Tackles: 165
- Interceptions: 1
- Fumble recoveries: 7
- Stats at Pro Football Reference

Darryl Lamon Morrison (born May 19, 1971) is an American former professional football player who was a safety in the National Football League (NFL) for four seasons with the Washington Redskins. He played college football for the Arizona Wildcats and was selected in the sixth round of the 1993 NFL draft.

Pre-draft measurables
Height	Weight	Arm length	Hand span	40-yard dash	10-yard split	20-yard split	20-yard shuttle	Vertical jump	Broad jump	Bench press
5 ft 10 7/8 in (1.80 m)	185 lb (84 kg)	30 7/8 in (0.78 m)	9 3/8 in (0.24 m)	4.70 s	1.62 s	2.72 s	4.14 s	38.0 in (0.97 m)	10 ft 2 in (3.10 m)	18 reps

== Personal life ==
Darryl and his wife, JoAnn, have five children. His son Benjamin plays football for the Tampa Bay Buccaneers and his daughter Naomi was an All-American gymnast at Michigan and a member of their national championship-winning team in 2021.

Darryl earned a Master’s in Divinity and is now the pastor of a Phoenix church.
