= Cory Raymer =

American football player (born 1973)

No. 52, 66
- Position: Center

Personal information
- Born: March 3, 1973 (age 53); Fond du Lac, Wisconsin, U.S.
- Listed height: 6 ft 3 in (1.91 m)
- Listed weight: 300 lb (136 kg)

Career information
- High school: Goodrich (Fond du Lac)
- College: Wisconsin
- NFL draft: 1995: 2nd round, 37th overall pick

Career history
- Washington Redskins (1995–2001); San Diego Chargers (2002–2003); Washington Redskins (2004–2005)

Awards and highlights
- Consensus All-American (1994); 2× First-team All-Big Ten (1993, 1994)

Career NFL statistics
- Games played: 98
- Games started: 83
- Fumble recoveries: 3
- Stats at Pro Football Reference

Cory Gene Raymer (born March 3, 1973) is an American former professional football player who was a center for 11 seasons in the National Football League (NFL). Raymer played college football for the Wisconsin Badgers, and was honored as an All-American. A second-round pick in the 1995 NFL draft, he played professionally for the Washington Redskins and San Diego Chargers of the NFL.

== Early life ==
Raymer was born in Fond du Lac, Wisconsin. He attended Goodrich High School in Fond du Lac, and was a USA Today All-America honorable mention selection and earned first-team all-state honors as a defensive tackle.

== College career ==
Raymer attended the University of Wisconsin–Madison, where he played for the Wisconsin Badgers football team from 1991 to 1994. As a senior in 1994, he was recognized as a consensus first-team All-American at center. He was Wisconsin's first consensus All-American since Tim Krumrie in 1981. Raymer was also one of 12 nominees for the 1994 Lombardi Award, which is awarded to college football's top lineman. He graduated from Wisconsin with a bachelor's degree in letters and sciences.

== Professional career ==
Raymer was selected by the Washington Redskins in the second round (37th pick) of the 1995 NFL draft. He played for the Redskins from 1995 to 2001. In 1996, while returning home from a fishing trip, a car crossed his path. While attempting to avoid the car, Raymer's vehicle overturned and he suffered numerous injuries, including a bruised kidney, fractured vertebra and badly sprained left shoulder. This would cause him to miss the rest of the season and put his NFL career in jeopardy. However, Raymer played six games the following season and started three after Jeff Uhlenhake was sidelined.

The 1998 season marked the first time Raymer started all 16 games in an NFL season. He took the snap in all but one of the 1,029 offensive plays. Again in 1999 Raymer started all 16 games and also playoff games. He was a fixture on the Redskins' offensive line, composed of Keith Sims and Tre Johnson at guard, Andy Heck and Jon Jansen at tackle, the NFL's second-ranked offense that season with 443 points (27.7 points/game), with Brad Johnson at quarterback. In a wild card game of the 1999-00 NFL playoffs, Washington defeated the Detroit Lions, rushing for a massive 223 yards, as the interior line bowled over defensive tackles James Jones (defensive lineman) and Luther Elliss with middle linebacker Stephen Boyd. But the Redskins lost to the Tampa Bay Buccaneers in the divisional round. The 2000 season was a setback for Raymer, suffering a torn ACL in practice and reinjuring his knee a month later, again in practice. This led to Raymer being placed on the injured reserve and missing the entire season, not playing in a single game, replaced at starting center by Mark Fischer. But Raymer bounced back again in 2001 by starting in all 16 games in an 8-8 won-lost season.

Raymer then went on to play for the San Diego Chargers in 2002, while Larry Moore became the starting center for Washington. But Raymer but suffered a season-ending Achilles injury just three games into the season. The following year, Raymer again bounced back and played in 15 games, starting eight.

On March 11, 2004, Raymer returned to the Redskins by signing as a free agent, when he appeared in 15 games and started 14 in a 6–10 season. In 2005, he lost his starting job to free agent Casey Rabach, but he did see action in two regular games and also against the Seattle Seahawks in the divisional playoff game. After the season ended, he retired from football.
