= Mike Haluchak =

American football player and coach (born 1949)

Mike Haluchak (born November 28, 1949, in Concord, CA) is an American football coach. He served as the linebackers coach for the Oakland Raiders from 2009 until 2010.

== College career ==
Haluchak played college football at the University of Southern California. He went on to get a master's degree in secondary education from California Lutheran University.

== Coaching career ==
Haluchak has coached at the college and pro level since 1976. He's had stints with the San Diego Chargers, Cincinnati Bengals, Washington Redskins, New York Giants, St. Louis Rams, Jacksonville Jaguars, and Cleveland Browns.

Was hired to coach the linebackers of the Oakland Raiders in February 2009. He fired from the position by new head coach Hue Jackson in January 2011 after the 2010 season came to a close.

== Coaching Timeline ==
- San Diego Chargers (1986–1991) LB
- Cincinnati Bengals (1992–1993) LB
- Washington Redskins (1994–1996) LB
- New York Giants (1997–1999) LB
- St. Louis Rams (2000–2002) LB
- Jacksonville Jaguars (2003–2004) LB
- Cleveland Browns (2005–2008) LB
- Oakland Raiders (2009–2010) LB
