= Tom Carter (American football) =

American football player (born 1972)

No. 25, 21
- Position: Cornerback

Personal information
- Born: September 5, 1972 (age 54); St. Petersburg, Florida, U.S.
- Listed height: 6 ft 0 in (1.83 m)
- Listed weight: 187 lb (85 kg)

Career information
- High school: Lakewood (St. Petersburg, Florida)
- College: Notre Dame
- NFL draft: 1993: 1st round, 17th overall pick

Career history
- Washington Redskins (1993–1996); Chicago Bears (1997–1999); Cincinnati Bengals (1999–2001)

Awards and highlights
- PFWA All-Rookie Team (1993); Third-team All-American (1992)

Career NFL statistics
- Tackles: 360
- Interceptions: 27
- Touchdowns: 1
- Stats at Pro Football Reference

Thomas Carter, III (born September 5, 1972) is an American former professional football player who was a cornerback in the National Football League (NFL) from 1993 to 2001. The 17th overall draft pick in the first round of the 1993 NFL draft, Carter played nine seasons for the Washington Redskins, Chicago Bears, and Cincinnati Bengals. Carter played quarterback at Lakewood High School in St. Petersburg, Florida, and accepted a scholarship to play college football at the University of Notre Dame, where he was a three-year starter at the free safety position. He currently works for the NFL Players Association.

Carter has four children: Alex, Madison, Cameron, and Peyton. Cameron died of Type 1 diabetes at age 14 on February 21, 2012. Alex Carter was named Virginia's 2011 Gatorade Player of the Year, and was selected in the 3rd round of the 2015 NFL draft by the Detroit Lions after a standout career at Stanford. Madison is currently a news reporter for WVIR-TV NBC29 in Charlottesville, Virginia.
