= James Jenkins (American football) =

American football player (born 1967)

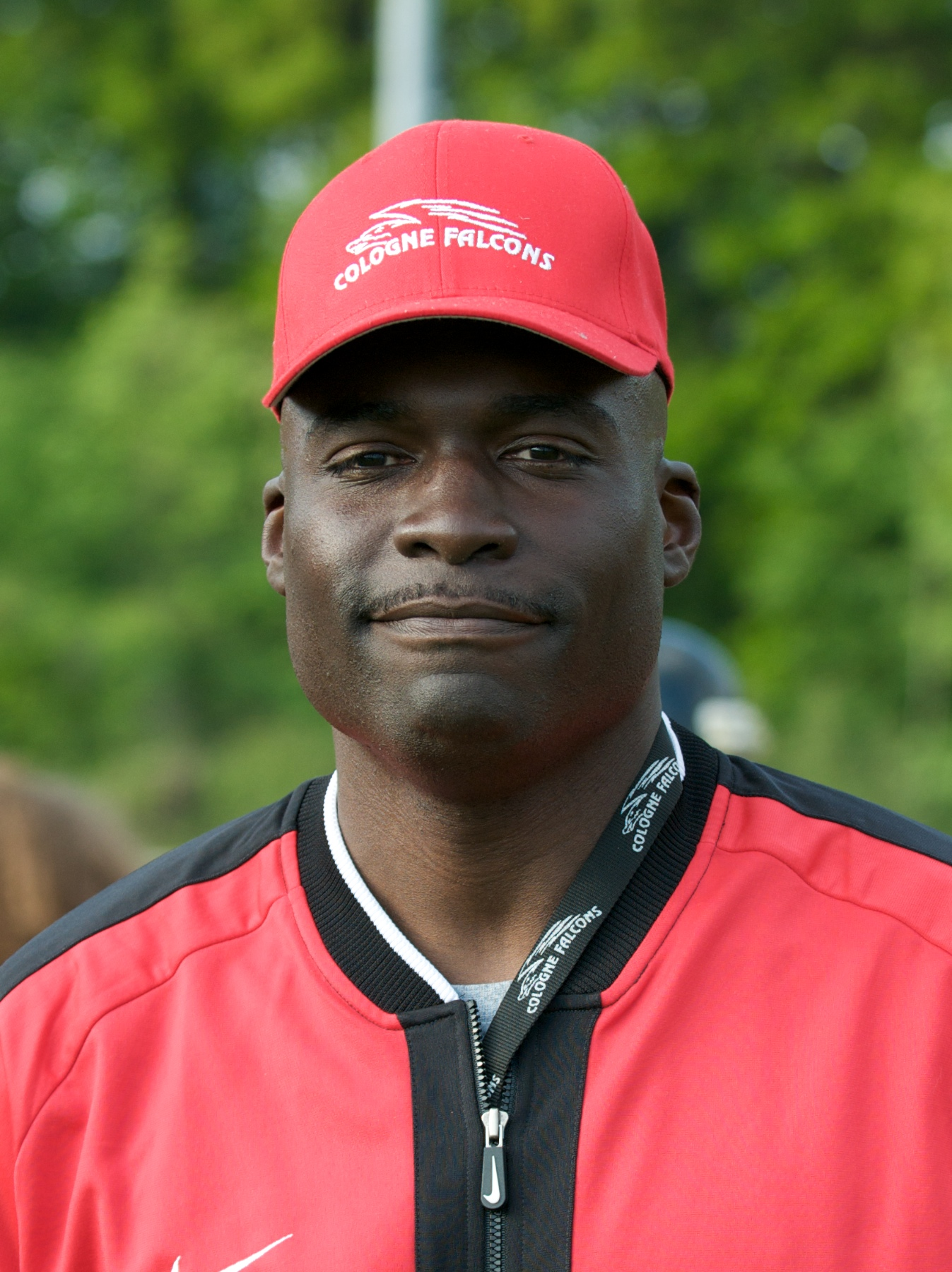

No. 88
- Position: Tight end

Personal information
- Born: August 17, 1967 (age 59); Staten Island, New York, U.S.
- Listed height: 6 ft 2 in (1.88 m)
- Listed weight: 243 lb (110 kg)

Career information
- High school: Staten Island Academy
- College: Rutgers
- NFL draft: 1991: undrafted

Career history
- Washington Redskins (1991–2000)

Awards and highlights
- Super Bowl champion (XXVI)

Career NFL statistics
- Receptions: 15
- Receiving yards: 114
- Touchdowns: 7
- Stats at Pro Football Reference

James Jenkins (born August 17, 1967) is an American former professional football player who was a tight end for 10 seasons in the National Football League (NFL) for the Washington Redskins He was a blocking specialist on offense, winning Super Bowl XXVI during the 1991 season. He played college football for the Rutgers Scarlet Knights

Jenkins attended Curtis High School and Rutgers University. While undrafted, Joe Gibbs made a personal appeal to Jenkins to not join the Army and concentrate on professional football instead. After working as an NFL strength and conditioning coach, he worked as a State Trooper for VA State Police, where he earned several performance awards for DUI enforcement. He coached several teams in Germany and was the head coach of the Düsseldorf Panthers, a German division I football team. Previously he was employed as a personal training manager for LifeTime Fitness in Sugarloaf, Georgia.

Pre-draft measurables
Height	Weight	Arm length	Hand span	Bench press
6 ft 2 3/8 in (1.89 m)	238 lb (108 kg)	33 1/2 in (0.85 m)	10 1/2 in (0.27 m)	15 reps
All values from NFL Combine

== See also ==
- List of Rutgers University people
