= Swannanoa =

Swannanoa may refer to:

in New Zealand

- Swannanoa, New Zealand, in North Canterbury, New Zealand

in the United States

- Swannanoa Gap, a pass through the Blue Ridge Mountains
- Lake Swannanoa, New Jersey
- Swannanoa, North Carolina
- Swannanoa River, North Carolina
- Swannanoa (mansion), Virginia, listed on the NRHP
