= Swannanoa Gap =

Pass through the Blue Ridge Mountains

- Suwali Nûⁿnâhi
- Location within the United States Location within North Carolina
- Elevation: 2,657 ft (810 m)
- Traversed by: I-40 / US 70

Location
- Location: North Carolina
- Range: Blue Ridge Mountains
- Coordinates: 35°37′17″N 82°16′13″W

The Swannanoa Gap is a pass in the eastern United States through the Blue Ridge Mountains to the Asheville plateau. The pass sits on the Buncombe-McDowell County line in North Carolina near the head of the Catawba River. Long traversed by Native Americans, its trail was the first road into Buncombe County from the east.

According to James Mooney, a prominent ethnographer of the Bureau of American Ethnology, the pass was used by the Cherokee to reach Cheraw country. The Cherokee name for the pass is Suwali Nûⁿnâhi. Mooney wrote it was "the pass through which ran the trail from the Cherokee to the Suwali or Ani-Suwali, living east of the mountains." The names of the census-designated place of Swannanoa, North Carolina, the Swannanoa River, Lake Swannanoa, New Jersey, and Swannanoa, New Zealand are derived from its name. Its name in modern Cherokee syllabary by the neographer Sequoyah is not known.

== History ==
The gap was passed through by general Griffith Rutherford in September 1776 while on his "'scorched-earth' warfare" campaign against the Cherokee, who allied with the British in the American Revolutionary War.

In 1865, during the American Civil War, 500 confederate men and four pieces of heavy artillery were ordered to blockade the Swannanoa Gap from the encroaching Union cavalry led by brigadier general Alvan Cullem Gillem.

In 1880 the Western North Carolina Railroad's railway was completed after passing through the Swannanoa Gap and over Old Fort Mountain. The majority of the labor used by the railroad was from African American prisoners and many tragic accidents occurred during its construction on the steep terrain. The number of prisoners used was estimated at 3,000 to 3,500. Records are not complete but at least 139 died from various causes including disease, and according to oral history, 19 people died from construction of the tunnel. Superintendent James Wilson decided the Swannanoa Tunnel should be built with men working on both sides. Teams of oxen and a 12-ton steam locomotive were used to haul rock removed by blasting. Workers from the two sides met in the 1,832-foot tunnel on March 11, 1879. The folk song "Swannanoa Tunnel" was a work song that resulted from this effort.

== Trail ==
The Swannanoa Gap trail was the first road into Buncombe County from the east. It led from Old Fort to the head of the Swannanoa River and Bee Tree Creek. The trail crosses the Catawba River about half a mile south over the Catawba River headwaters then descends over the Swannanoa Valley.

== See also ==
- Old Buncombe Road, through the Saluda Gap on the southwest of Swannanoa Gap
