= Maynard Adams =

American philosopher (1919–2003)

Elie Maynard Adams (December 29, 1919 – November 17, 2003) was an American philosopher of value and meaning devoted to understanding and criticizing the philosophical foundations of modern Western culture and developing an intellectual vision that makes sense of the human condition.

== Biography ==
Adams was born on December 29, 1919 in Clarkton, Halifax County, Virginia, to Wade Hampton Adams and Bessie Calloway Adams. He grew up on a tobacco farm and attended a one-room school.

He was married for 61 years to Phyllis Stevenson Adams.

Among other personal projects, he hand-dug a full-sized basement to his family home with a pick ax, a shovel and a wheelbarrow, including completing the masonry and the electrical wiring himself.

Adams died on November 17, 2003, at age 83.

== Education ==
Adams received his undergraduate degree and a master's degree in philosophy from the University of Richmond. While there, he was pastor of several churches. He received a divinity degree from Colgate Rochester and his doctorate in philosophy from Harvard in 1948.

After finishing his doctorate, Adams said he wanted to return to the South because he loved the South and wanted to help the region confront and reject its history of racism.

He was a recipient of honorary degrees from the University of Richmond and from Wake Forest University.

== Teaching ==
After a year of teaching at the University of Ohio in Athens, Adams joined the faculty of the University of North Carolina at Chapel Hill in 1948 and served as chairman of the philosophy department from 1960 to 1965 and as faculty chairman from 1976 to 1979. During the Vietnam War era, he helped launch the Curriculum in Peace, War and Defense. He also helped create the Program in Humanities and Human Values and served as chair of the Program's advisory board for its first seven years. By the time of his death, he was Kenan Professor of Philosophy, Emeritus.

During summer sessions, he taught as a visiting professor at the University of Southern California, the University of Calgary, and the State University of New York at Albany. He also taught many summer sessions through the University of North Carolina extension division at Blue Ridge Assembly in Black Mountain, N.C.

He was committed to improving education in the South, and he believed strongly in the importance of the humanities. Former UNC-CH Chancellor Ferebee Taylor said Adams "was an intellectual giant but also a gentle and caring human being."

In 1971, he was awarded the university's Thomas Jefferson Award; in 1992, the university established the E.M. Adams distinguished professorship, and in 1998 the Program in the Humanities and Human Values at the university created the annual E.M. Adams Lecture in Humanities and Human Values.

The News & Observer described him as having "inspired a great following with his thirst for knowledge and love for deep thinking."

== Philosophy ==
Adams wrote, co-wrote or edited 12 books, including The Metaphysics of Self and World, and a book for more popular audiences, A Society Fit for Human Beings. He also published more than 100 scholarly articles and reviews, and he was a well-respected teacher.

Adams' basic purpose as a philosopher was to demonstrate that our value and meaning experiences give us knowledge of the world. As Glenn Blackburn describes in his intellectual biography of Adams, Adams rejected the materialistic view of reality that dominates modern societies and the related scientific naturalist worldview that assumes that sensory experience is our only basic source of knowledge and that the sensory realm is the only reality. He explains that such value and meaning nihilism is the reason that many modern people endure chronic anxiety about the lack of meaning in life.

Instead, Adams argues that our window onto reality is much larger than the sense-experience window; we also have value experiences and meaning experiences that we learn from. Humans cannot properly conceive of the universe in purely physical terms but rather must include value and meaning in our conception of the universe. We also must think of ourselves as value and meaning beings, as well as physical beings, not solely as material creatures.

The philosophy that Adams called "realistic humanism" is unusual in that it comprises a comprehensive systematic philosophy covering all fundamental ways of understanding the world, including a human metaphysics, an epistemology, and philosophies of mind, ethics, religion, nature, and history. Blackburn writes that in the 2500-year history of Western civilization, there have been no more than two to three dozen comprehensive systematic philosophers of this kind.

Adams' philosophical work culminated in A Society Fit for Human Beings, in which he lays out a vision of a future that cultivates humanity and corrects the weaknesses of modernity: moral and value relativism, dehumanization resulting from materialistic conceptions of ourselves, and our increasingly severe environmental problems. He shows how to build value and meaning into society, defining a more hopeful vision of what the future can be.

== Community ==
Adams was one of the founders of Chapel Hill Community Action, Inc., an organization that addressed issues of segregation and poverty in Chapel Hill, and he served as its chairman. That program was adopted as a nationwide model by the federal Office of Economic Opportunity. He served as chairman of the Joint OrangeChatham Community Action, Inc., and vice chairman of the Orange County Economic Opportunity Commission, Inc. He also was a frequent commentator on issues of education and public affairs in local newspapers.

== Publications ==
- Fundamentals of General Logic, 1954
- Logic Problems, 1954
- Language of Value (with others), 1957
- Ethical Naturalism and the Modern World View, 1960
- Categorical Analysis: Selected Essays of Everett W. Hall, ed.
- "Common Sense Realism: Critical Essays on the Philosophy of Everett W. Hall", ed., Southern Journal of Philosophy, vol. 4 (fall), 1966
- Philosophy and the Modern Mind, 1975
- The Idea of America (with others), 1977
- The Metaphysics of Self and World: Toward a Humanistic Philosophy, 1991
- Religion and Cultural Freedom, 1993
- A Society Fit for Human Beings, 1997
