= Wolfpit Branch (Swannanoa River tributary) =

Stream in North Carolina, USA

Wolfpit Branch Tributary to Swannanoa River
- Location of Wolfpit Branch mouth Wolfpit Branch (Swannanoa River tributary) (the United States)

Location
- Country: United States
- State: North Carolina
- County: Buncombe
- City: Black Mountain

Physical characteristics
- Source: divide between Wolfpit Branch and Broad River
  - location: about 3 miles south of Black Mountain, North Carolina
  - coordinates: 35°34′19″N 082°20′30″W
  - elevation: 3,640 ft (1,110 m)
- Mouth: Swannanoa River
  - location: Black Mountain, North Carolina
  - coordinates: 35°36′28″N 082°20′26″W
  - elevation: 2,270 ft (690 m)
- Length: 2.55 mi (4.10 km)
- Basin size: 1.78 square miles (4.6 km^{2})
- Discharge
  - location: Swannanoa River
  - average: 3.20 cu ft/s (0.091 m^{3}/s) at mouth with Swannanoa River

Basin features
- Progression: Swannanoa River → French Broad River → Tennessee River → Ohio River → Mississippi River → Gulf of Mexico
- River system: French Broad River
- Tributaries
  - left: Briar Branch
  - right: unnamed tributaries
- Bridges: Amphitheater Lane, Lee Hall Circle, Blue Ridge Circle, Maney Lane, I-40

Wolfpit Branch is a 2.55 mi (4.10 km) long 2nd order tributary to the Swannanoa River in Buncombe County, North Carolina.

== Course ==
Wolfpit Branch rises about 3 miles south of Black Mountain, North Carolina in Buncombe County on the Broad River divide. Wolfpit Branch then flows north to meet the Swannanoa River at Black Mountain, North Carolina.

== Watershed ==
Wolfpit Branch drains 1.78 square miles (4.6 km^{2}) of area, receives about 50.0 in/year of precipitation, has a topographic wetness index of 275.42 and is about 91% forested.
