= Camp Branch (Swannanoa River tributary) =

Stream in North Carolina, US

Camp Branch Tributary to Swannanoa River
- Location of Camp Branch mouth Camp Branch (Swannanoa River tributary) (the United States)

Location
- Country: United States
- State: North Carolina
- County: Buncombe

Physical characteristics
- Source: base of Miami Mountain
  - location: about 1 mile south of Black Mountain, North Carolina
  - coordinates: 35°36′24″N 082°17′58″W
  - elevation: 2,880 ft (880 m)
- Mouth: Swannanoa River
  - location: about 0.25 miles south of Black Mountain, North Carolina
  - coordinates: 35°36′18″N 082°19′26″W
  - elevation: 2,310 ft (700 m)
- Length: 1.54 mi (2.48 km)
- Basin size: 3.02 square miles (7.8 km^{2})
- Discharge
  - location: Swannanoa River
  - average: 5.26 cu ft/s (0.149 m^{3}/s) at mouth with Swannanoa River

Basin features
- Progression: Swannanoa River → French Broad River → Tennessee River → Ohio River → Mississippi River → Gulf of Mexico
- River system: French Broad River
- Tributaries
  - left: unnamed tributaries
  - right: unnamed tributaries
- Bridges: Camp Branch Road (x3), Lakey Gap Road, Sellers Lane, Donne Drive, Chaucer Road, NC 9, Dogwood Lane, Blue Ridge Road

Camp Branch is a 1.54 mi (2.48 km) long 2nd order tributary to the Swannanoa River in Buncombe County, North Carolina.

== Course ==
Camp Branch rises about 1 mile southeast of Black Mountain, North Carolina, in Buncombe County at the base of Miami Mountain. Camp Branch then flows west-southwest to meet the Swannanoa River about 0.25 miles south of Black Mountain.

== Watershed ==
Camp Branch drains 3.02 square miles (7.8 km^{2}) of area, receives about 50.3 in/year of precipitation, has a topographic wetness index of 238.99 and is about 81% forested.
