= Tomahawk Branch (Swannanoa River tributary) =

Stream in North Carolina, USA

Tomahawk Branch Tributary to Swannanoa River
- Location of Tomahawk Branch mouth Tomahawk Branch (Swannanoa River tributary) (the United States)

Location
- Country: United States
- State: North Carolina
- County: Buncombe
- City: Black Mountain

Physical characteristics
- Source: divide between Tomahawk Branch and North Fork Swannanoa River
  - location: about 1.5 miles north of Black Mountain, North Carolina
  - coordinates: 35°38′28″N 082°20′05″W
  - elevation: 2,570 ft (780 m)
- Mouth: Swannanoa River
  - location: Black Mountain, North Carolina
  - coordinates: 35°36′32″N 082°20′08″W
  - elevation: 2,280 ft (690 m)
- Length: 2.61 mi (4.20 km)
- Basin size: 1.96 square miles (5.1 km^{2})
- Discharge
  - location: Swannanoa River
  - average: 2.84 cu ft/s (0.080 m^{3}/s) at mouth with Swannanoa River

Basin features
- Progression: Swannanoa River → French Broad River → Tennessee River → Ohio River → Mississippi River → Gulf of Mexico
- River system: French Broad River
- Tributaries
  - left: unnamed tributaries
  - right: unnamed tributaries
- Waterbodies: Lake Tomahawk
- Bridges: Walker Cove Road, North Fork Road, W Chapel Road, Hiawassee Avenue, 9th Street, Park Lane, Cragmont Road, W State Street

Tomahawk Branch is a 2.61 mi (4.20 km) long 1st order tributary to the Swannanoa River in Buncombe County, North Carolina. It has one impoundment at Lake Tomahawk.

== Course ==
Tomahawk Branch rises about 1.5 miles north of Black Mountain, North Carolina in Buncombe County on the North Fork Swannanoa River divide. Tomahawk Branch then flows south to meet the Swannanoa River at Black Mountain, North Carolina.

== Watershed ==
Tomahawk Branch drains 1.96 square miles (5.1 km^{2}) of area, receives about 47.6 in/year of precipitation, has a topographic wetness index of 326.37 and is about 36% forested.
