= Flat Creek (Swannanoa River tributary) =

Stream in North Carolina, USA

Flat Creek Tributary to Swannanoa River
- Location of Flat Creek mouth Flat Creek (Swannanoa River tributary) (the United States)

Location
- Country: United States
- State: North Carolina
- County: Buncombe
- City: Black Mountain; Montreat

Physical characteristics
- Source: divide between Flat Creek and Catawba River
  - location: about 0.5 miles south of Graybeard Mountain
  - coordinates: 35°40′40″N 082°17′24″W
  - elevation: 4,600 ft (1,400 m)
- Mouth: Swannanoa River
  - location: Black Mountain, North Carolina
  - coordinates: 35°37′07″N 082°18′55″W
  - elevation: 2,359 ft (719 m)
- Length: 5.39 mi (8.67 km)
- Basin size: 6.04 square miles (15.6 km^{2})
- Discharge
  - location: Swannanoa River
  - average: 11.05 cu ft/s (0.313 m^{3}/s) at mouth with Swannanoa River

Basin features
- Progression: Swannanoa River → French Broad River → Tennessee River → Ohio River → Mississippi River → Gulf of Mexico
- River system: French Broad River
- Tributaries
  - left: Puncheon Branch
  - right: Slaty Branch; Big Piney Branch; Piney Branch
- Waterbodies: Montreat Reservoir; Lake Susan
- Bridges: Calvin Trail, Graybeard Trail, Lookout Road, Texas Road, Shenandoah Terrace, Maryland Place, Flat Creek Road, East Street, E Cotton Avenue, Village Way, E State Street

Flat Creek is a 5.39 mi (8.67 km) long 2nd order tributary to the Swannanoa River in Buncombe County, North Carolina. It is impounded at Montreat Reservoir and Lake Susan.

== Course ==
Flat Creek rises about 0.5 miles south of Graybeard Mountain in Buncombe County on the Catawba River divide. Flat Creek then flows southwest through Montreat to meet the Swannanoa River at Black Mountain, North Carolina.

== Watershed ==
Flat Creek drains 6.04 square miles (15.6 km^{2}) of area, receives about 52.4 in/year of precipitation, has a topographic wetness index of 261.49 and is about 79% forested.
