= Everett Hall =

American philosopher

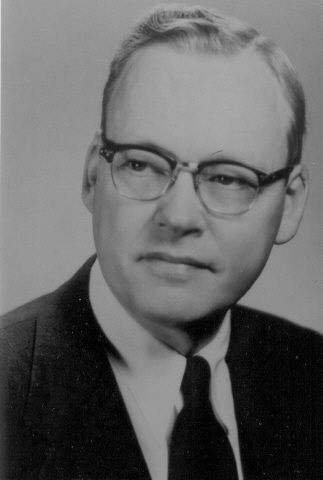
Everett Hall

Everett Wesley Hall (April 24, 1901 – June 17, 1960) was an American philosopher, known for his advocacy of common-sense realism and his notion of what he called the "categorial" primacy of certain assertions. Hall received his A.B. and M.A. degrees from Lawrence College, and his Ph.D. from Cornell University (in 1929). Between 1929 and his death in 1960, he taught at the following universities: the University of Chicago, Ohio State, Stanford, the University of Iowa, and the University of North Carolina (he was Department Chairman at the last two schools and was Kenan Professor at North Carolina). He also held visiting appointments at Northwestern University, the University of Southern California, and Kyoto University. Hall was the author of four books as well as numerous papers. The books are What is Value (1952), Modern Science and Human Values(1956), Philosophical Systems(1960), and Our Knowledge of Fact and Value (1961). After his death a number of his papers were collected by his colleague, E. M. Adams and published as Categorial Analysis (1964).

== Philosophy ==
Hall's philosophy was a linguistic variant of naive realism according to which values as well as physical objects and properties are much as generally understood by common sense. He was thus in the tradition of 18th-century Scottish realist, Thomas Reid. In spite of his claimed adherence to common sense and the "grammar" of ordinary language, Hall was an advocate of mind-body identity theory, claiming that some neurological events simply have a "mental dimension." His was, however, a property-dualistic version of identity theory, since he took Intentionality to be irreducible. In the theory of perception, he argued that perceptual errors and hallucinations can be explained by various properties being present in a manner other than exemplification. Such "ascriptions" of sensuous properties give evidence, but never provide certainty that the represented properties are also exemplified. This "intentional realism" in his view made the sense-data theory unnecessary. His views on perception are akin to later representationists such as Gilbert Harman, William Lycan and Fred Dretske, and "color realists" such as J. J. C. Smart, D. M. Armstrong, Alex Byrne, and Michael Tye. Hall's denial that the commonsense worldview must eventually be supplanted by a "scientific image" foreshadows positions later taken by Amie Thomasson. His view that Coherentism provides a reasonable foundation for human knowledge only if certain (perceptual) experiences provide their own inherent evidence was a precursor to the Foundherentism of Susan Haack.

Hall's meta-ethical views were similarly characterized by the belief that emotions, also being intentional (in Franz Brentano's sense), provide evidence of the presence of various values in the world. However, Hall did not agree with G. E. Moore that values are non-natural properties. In his view, values are neither properties nor relations: they are unnameable "ought-to-be-exemplifieds". A's being F is good if, and only if "it were good" that A be F. He held that values are in this way akin to semantic dimensions, like truth. That is, just as "Snow is white" is true if, and only if snow is white, Jones being saved is called for, if and only if "it were good that Jones be saved." His views regarding what may be named and what can only be "shown" by the grammar of one's language was heavily influenced by Wittgenstein's Tractatus Logico-Philosophicus. His normative ethics involved support for a consequentialism that maximizes "implementable free choices" as well as a complaint that the purely negative liberties supported by Natural Rights theory at least since the time of John Locke are insufficient for contemporary society. This position is set forth in his 1943 paper "An Ethics for Today".

In metaphilosophy, Hall held that there could be neither empirical nor deductive proofs of the superiority of one basic philosophy over another (say, of realism over phenomenalism), because he took preference of one or the other to be a function of acceptance of the view's basic categories, an attitude he called "categorial commitment". We are all, he claimed, trapped within a "categorio-centric predicament", since we cannot step outside of all categorial frameworks to determine which is best from some preferable outside footing. All we can do is try to determine which is most consonant with both common sense and modern science (which he denied were in irresolvable conflict). Cognizers do this, in his view, by examining what Hall called "the grammar of common sense", which he contrasted with individual common-sense beliefs such as those (like "Here are two hands") included in G.E.Moore's famous list. It was Hall's view that any philosophical position that conflicts too deeply or frequently with those features of common sense that are reflected in the basic grammatical forms that natural languages can take will be implausible not only to non-philosophers, but to philosophers as well when they are not actively engaging in revisionary metaphysics.

In 1966, The Southern Journal of Philosophy published a festschrift in Hall's honor which contained papers by, among others, his former colleague Wilfrid Sellars and his former student Romane Clark.
