= Charles D. Owen High School =

Location
- 99 Lake Eden Rd. Black Mountain, North Carolina 28711; United States
- Coordinates: 35°37′08″N 82°22′25″W

Information
- Type: Public
- Established: 1955 (71 years ago)
- CEEB code: 343880
- Principal: Dawn Rookey
- Faculty: 43.83 (FTE)
- Grades: 9–12
- Enrollment: 683 (2023-24)
- Student to teacher ratio: 15.58
- Campus type: Rural
- Colors: Maroon and grey
- Mascot: Warhorse and Warlassie
- Accreditation: Southern Association of Schools and Colleges; North Carolina Department of Public Instruction
- Website: cdohs.buncombeschools.org

Charles D. Owen High School (commonly known as Owen High School) is a public high school within the Buncombe County Schools System, located at 99 Lake Eden Road in Black Mountain, North Carolina. Its current principal is Dawn Rookey.

== Overview ==
Owen High School's mascot is the Warhorse and the Warlassie, and the school colors are maroon and grey. There are 63 teachers on the staff at OHS and the student to teacher ratio is 13:3. There are currently 14 teachers at Owen High School with the honor of having a National Board Certification.

== History ==
The school was created in 1955 with the consolidation of Black Mountain High School and Swannanoa High School. It was named for prominent local textile businessman, Charles D. Owen III (1904–1990). Black Mountain High School's mascot was the Dark Horses and Swannanoa high school's mascot was the Warriors, thus creating Owen High's mascot, the Warhorse. In 1991, a new school building was built on land donated by the Presbyterian Home for Children. The old Owen High School building now houses Owen Middle School.

== Athletics ==
Owen is well known for its football program which has accumulated a record (as of 9/26/08) and has captured 17 conference championships in its football history. The women's cross-country program won the state title in 1998 and the men's team brought home the state title in 2004, 2005, 2007, and 2008. The softball team also took home the state championship back-to-back in both 2000 and 2001. The Warhorse baseball teams have made an appearance in the state championship series in 1990, 1991, 1994 and 2000 but has failed to win. Men's and women's basketball both have one state championship appearance apiece both in 1988. The 1988 women's basketball team had an undefeated conference season. Owen athletes have won individual titles in various years in swimming, track, and wrestling. In 2009, the JV cheerleading team won the state title. In 2010, the varsity cheerleading team received a 1st runner up state title in the large varsity non-tumble division and won state in 2012. The Warhorses have various west regional, conference, and county championships, be it individual or team, in each of their programs. Hall of Fame coach Roy Williams began his basketball coaching career at Owen High School from 1973–78. In 2022, the Owen High Boys Cross Country Team won the NCHSAA 2A State Championships; this Championship team was led by Senior Elijah Jones in 3rd place. The Owen High Boys soccer team also won the 2022 NCHSAA 2A State Championships. Sophomore Davis Kendall led the team and ended the season with 50 total goals; this ranked him as the #1 Sophomore in the nation for the 2022 Soccer season

== Notable alumni ==
- Patricia Cornwell — author of over 20 well known crime novels
- Brad Daugherty — former NBA center for the Cleveland Cavaliers and 5x NBA All-Star selection
- Brad Johnson — former NFL quarterback for the Tampa Bay Buccaneers; Super Bowl XXXVII champion and 2x Pro Bowl selection
- Matt Lutz — film, television, and Broadway actor and singer
- Sammy Stewart — former MLB pitcher for the Baltimore Orioles and 1983 World Series Champion
- David Weaver — professional basketball player
