= Thomas Chapel A.M.E. Zion Church =

Historic church in North Carolina, United States

- U.S. National Register of Historic Places
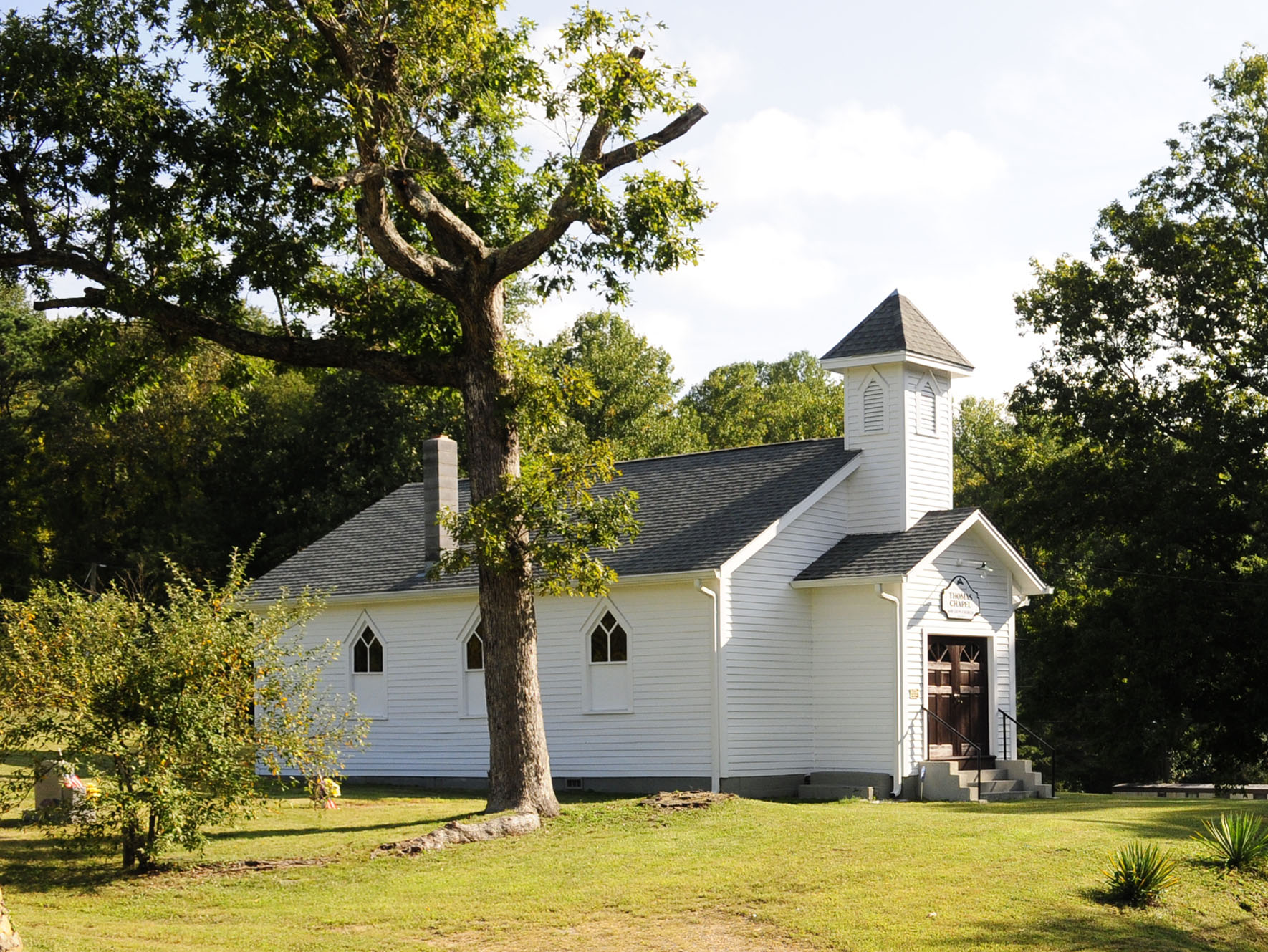
- Thomas Chapel A.M.E. Zion Church, September 2012

- Location within North Carolina Location within the United States
- Location: 300 Cragmont Rd., Black Mountain, North Carolina
- Coordinates: 35°36′59″N 82°20′23″W
- Area: 1.3 acres (0.53 ha)
- Built: 1922
- Built by: Kennedy, Ervin; et al.
- Architectural style: Gothic Revival
- NRHP reference No.: 09000262
- Added to NRHP: April 30, 2009

Thomas Chapel A.M.E. Zion Church is a historic African Methodist Episcopal church located at Black Mountain, Buncombe County, North Carolina. It was built in 1922 by descendants of freed slaves, and is a one-story, frame building with Gothic Revival design influences. It is sheathed in weatherboard and features a tall, pyramidal-roof bell tower.

This church may have always been called "Thomas Chapel", but a predecessor "Tom's Chapel", named for one of its builders, was built around 1892.

It was deemed locally significant as an intact example of a Gothic Revival-influenced church and was listed on the National Register of Historic Places in 2009.
