= Dougherty Heights Historic District =

Historic district in North Carolina, United States

Dougherty Heights Historic District is a national historic district located at Black Mountain, Buncombe County, North Carolina. The district encompasses 54 contributing buildings in a predominantly residential section of Black Mountain. The district includes a variety of early-20th century dwellings in the Colonial Revival, American Craftsman, and Queen Anne styles. The district is characterized by a mix of primarily one- and two-story frame houses on small lots.

It was listed on the National Register of Historic Places in 2011.

== Gallery ==
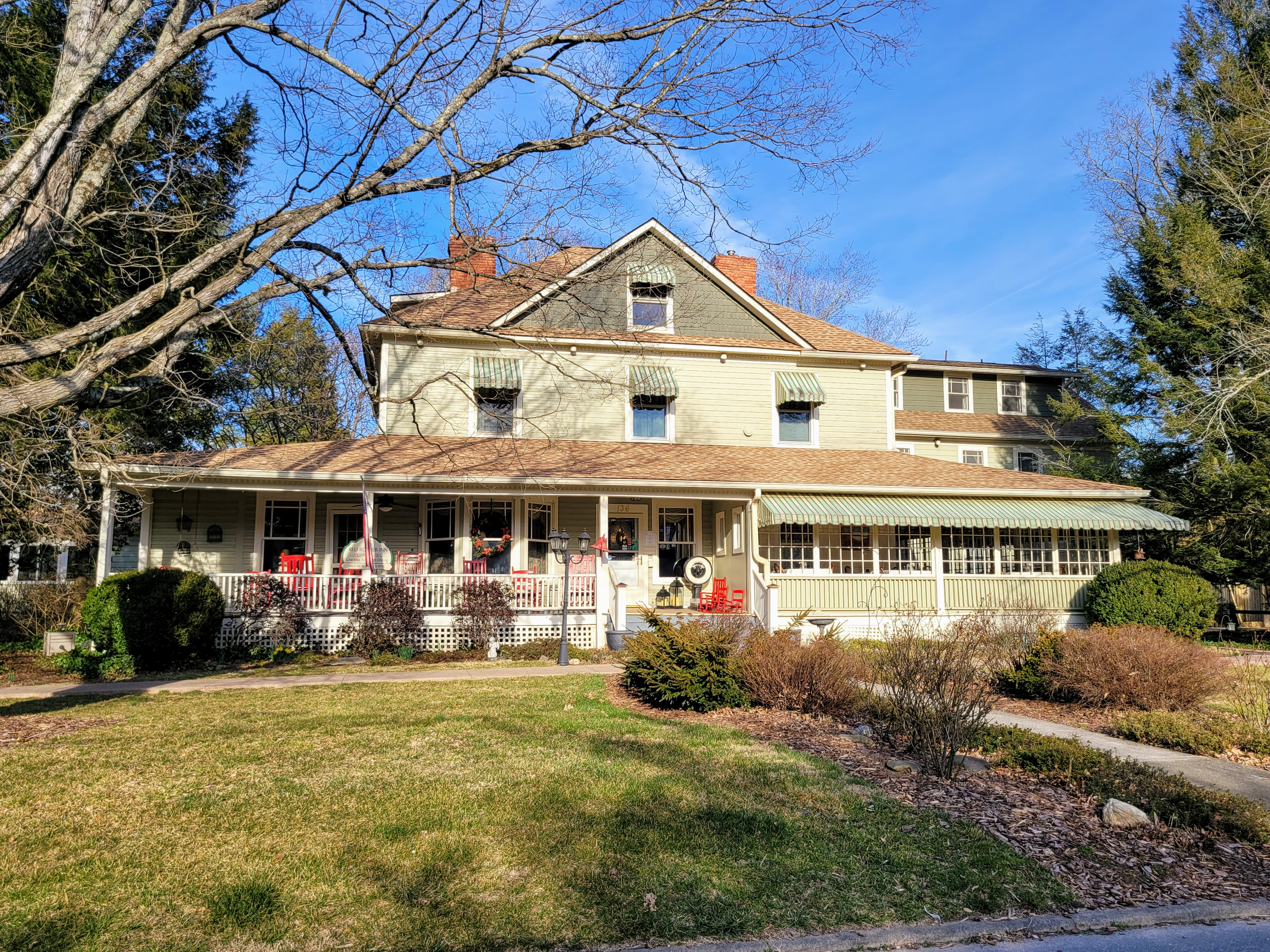
Silas and Martha Dougherty House-Red Rocker Inn, 2022

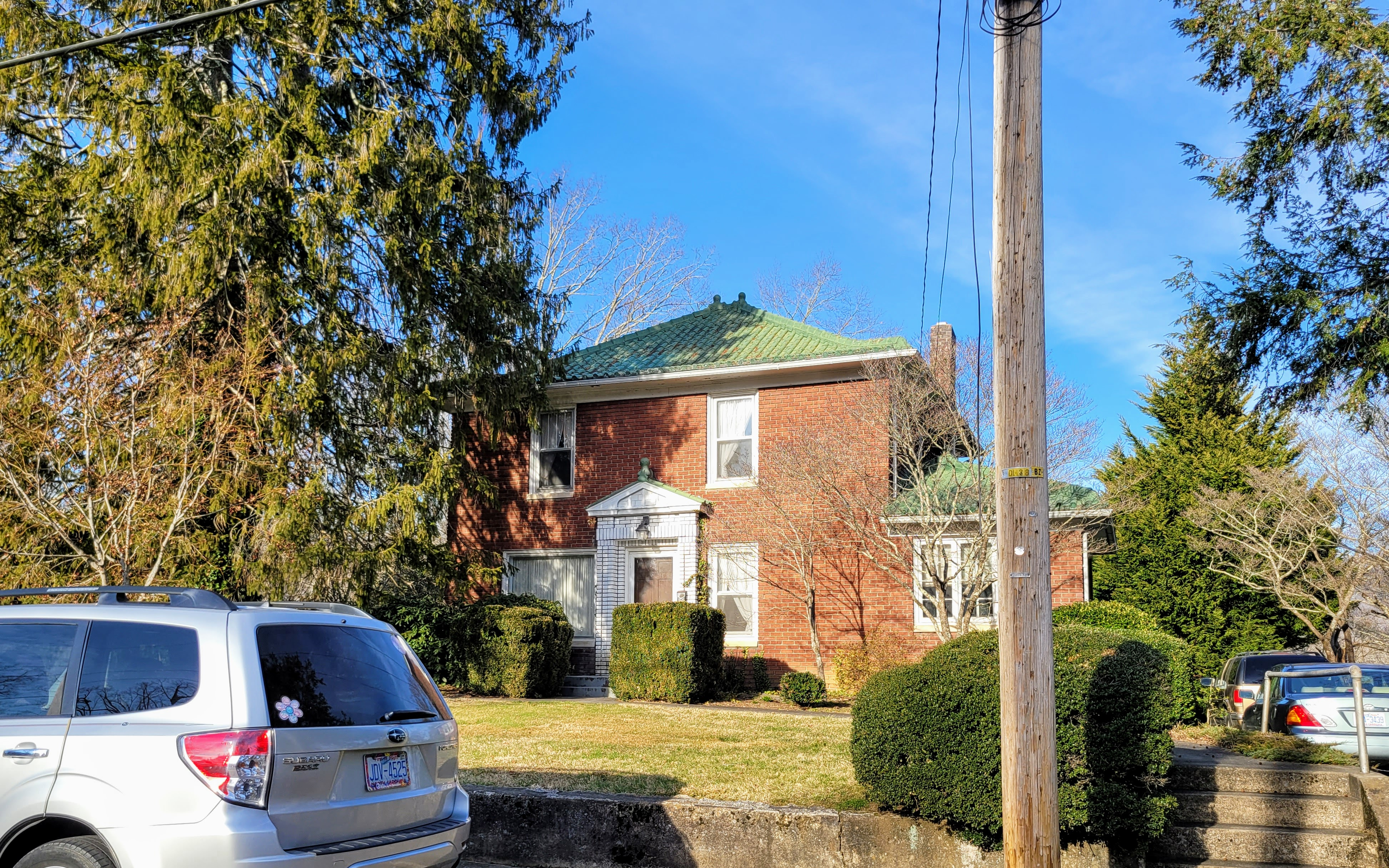
Robert L. Woodard House, 2022

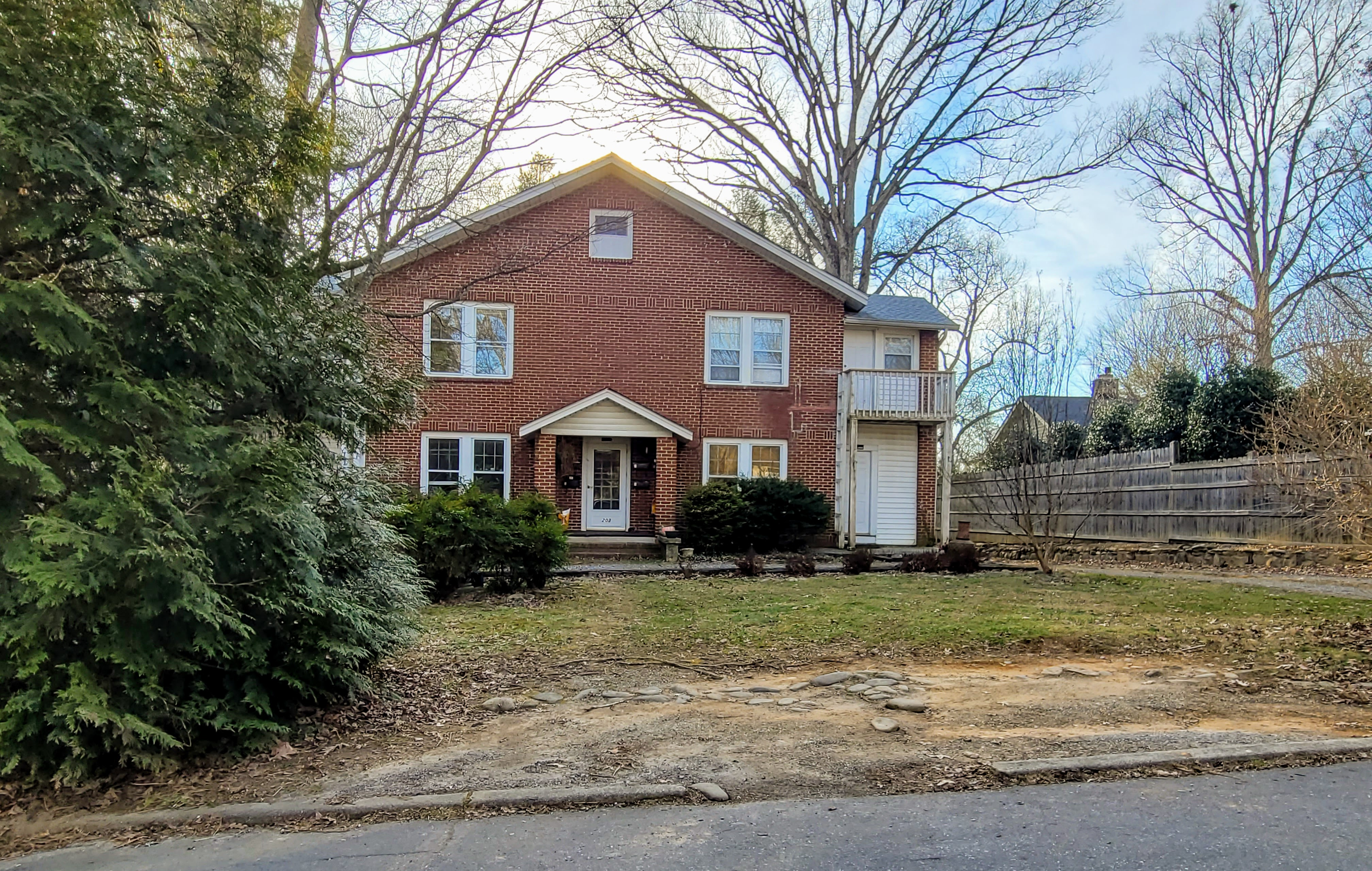
Phillips Apartments, 2022

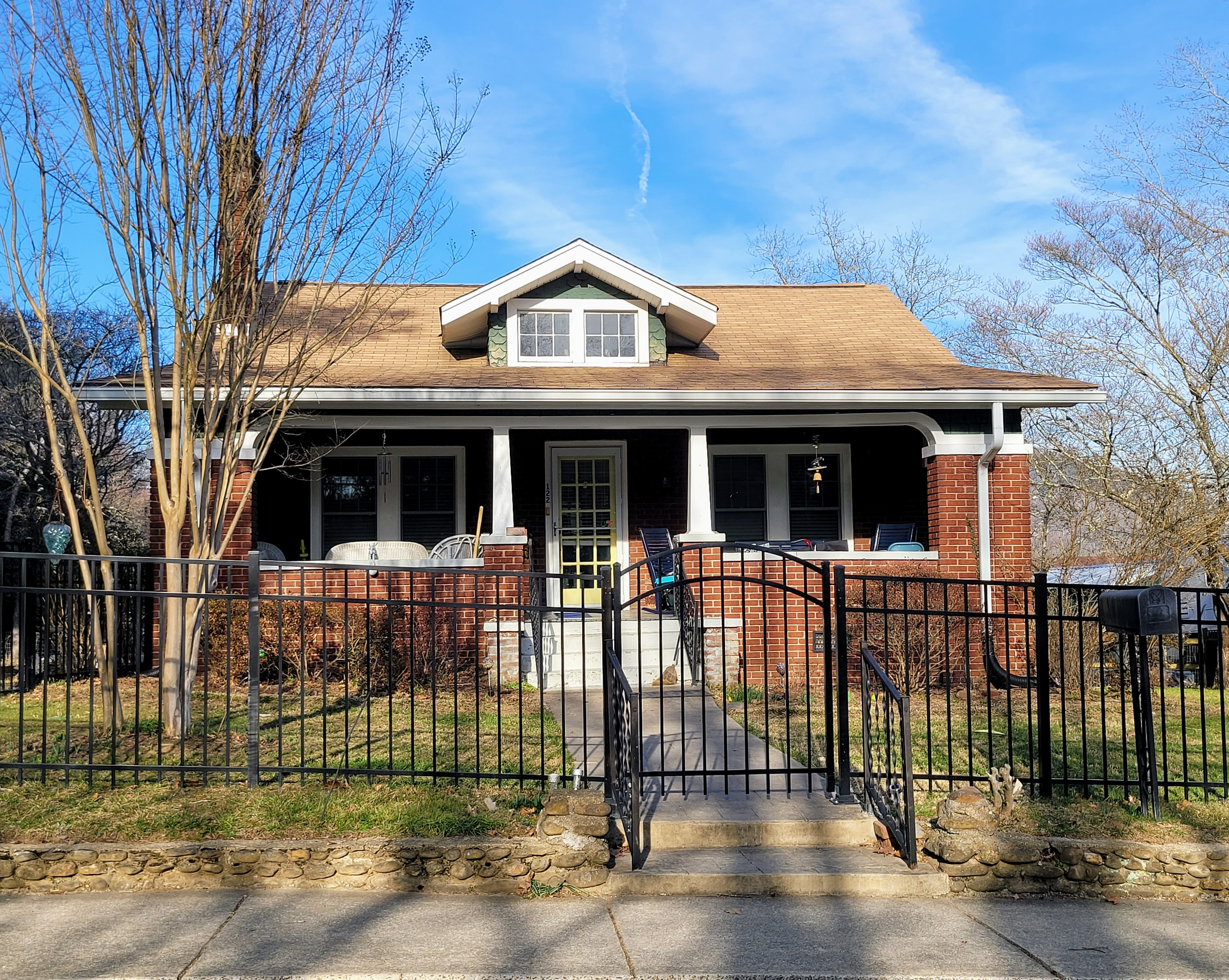
E.E. and Myrtle White House, 2022

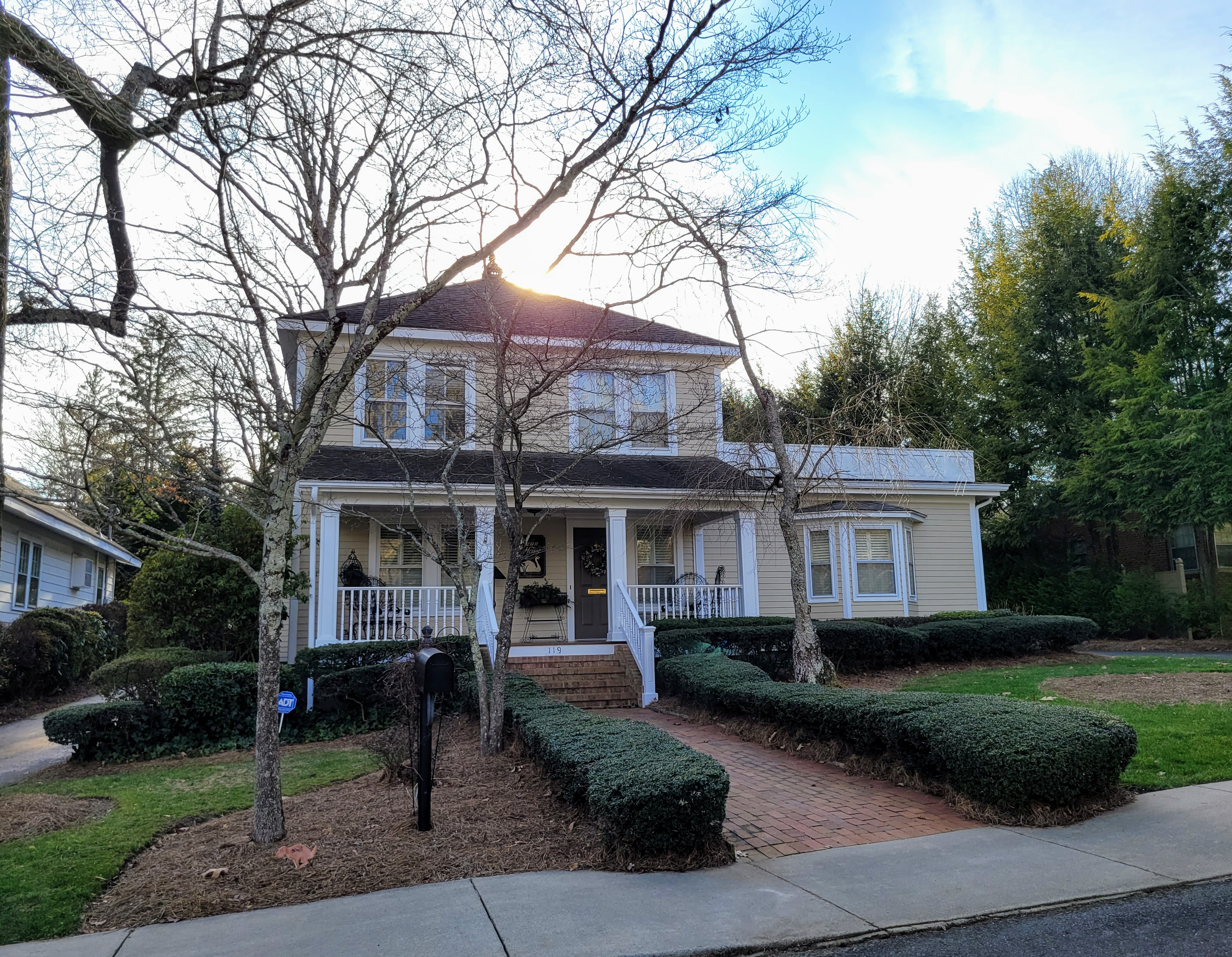
Dr. George L. and Maria Pritchard House, 2022

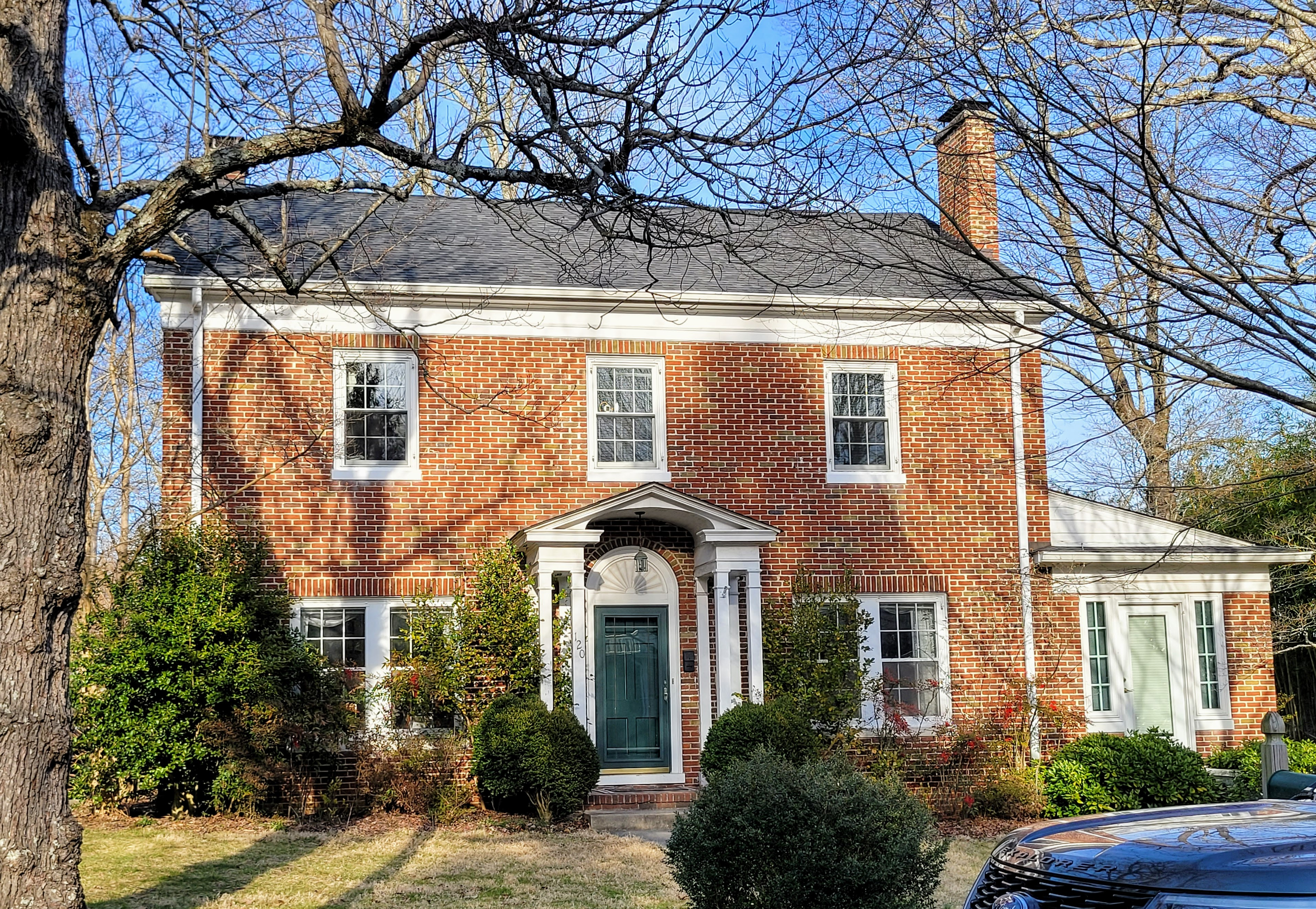
Dr. Clifford and Grace Porter House, 2022

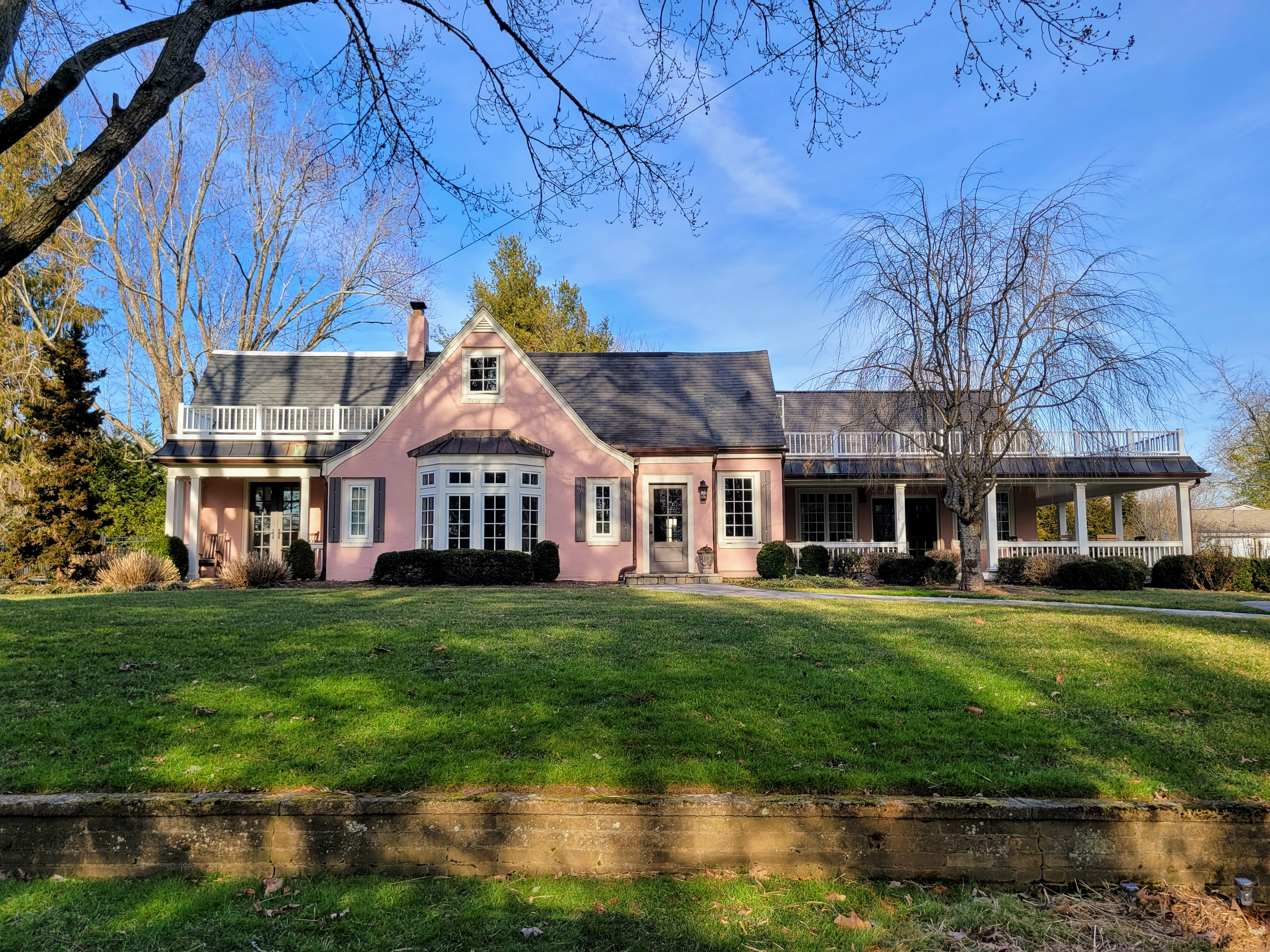
304 New Bern Avenue, 2022

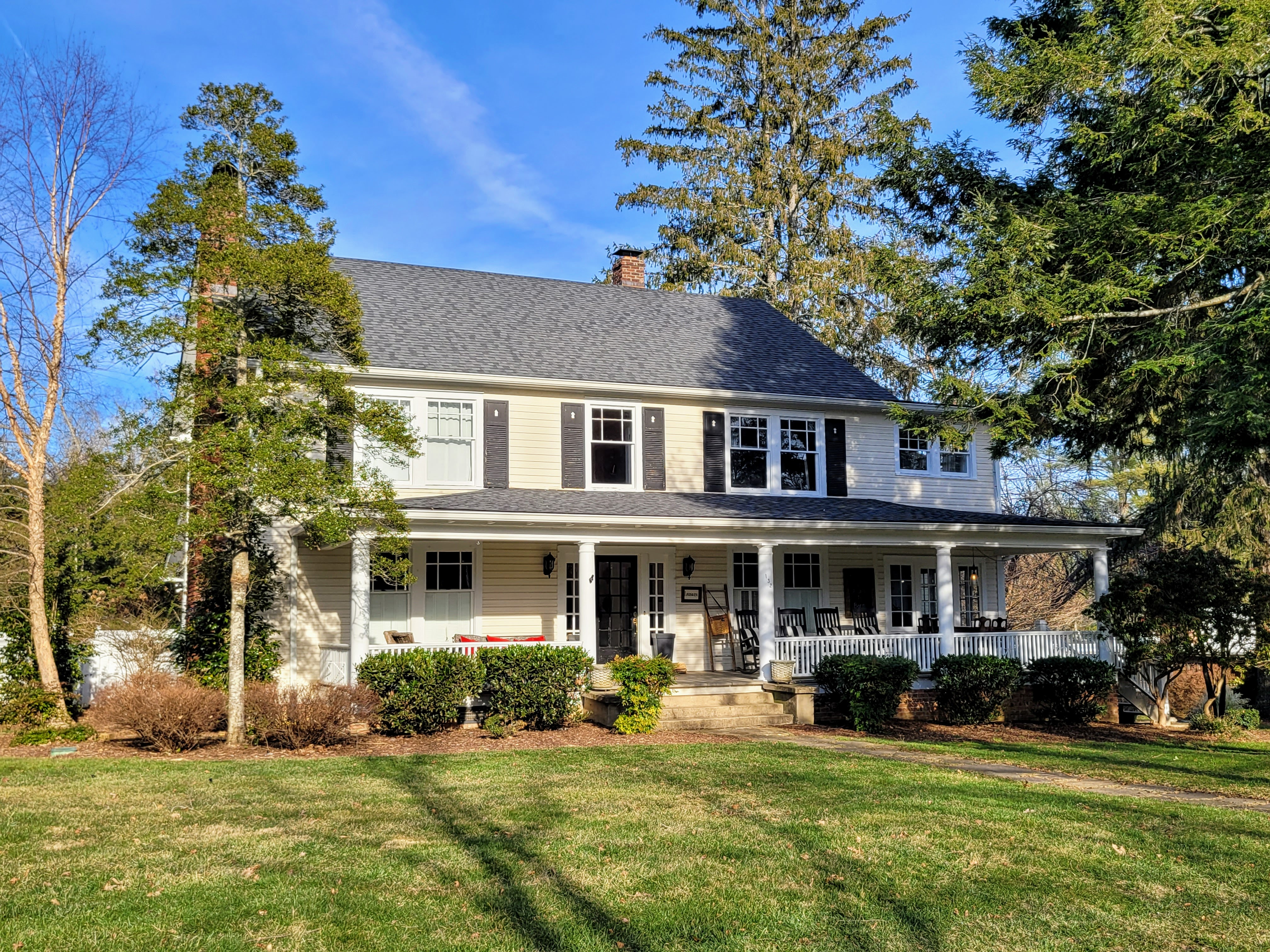
132 N. Daugherty Street, 2022

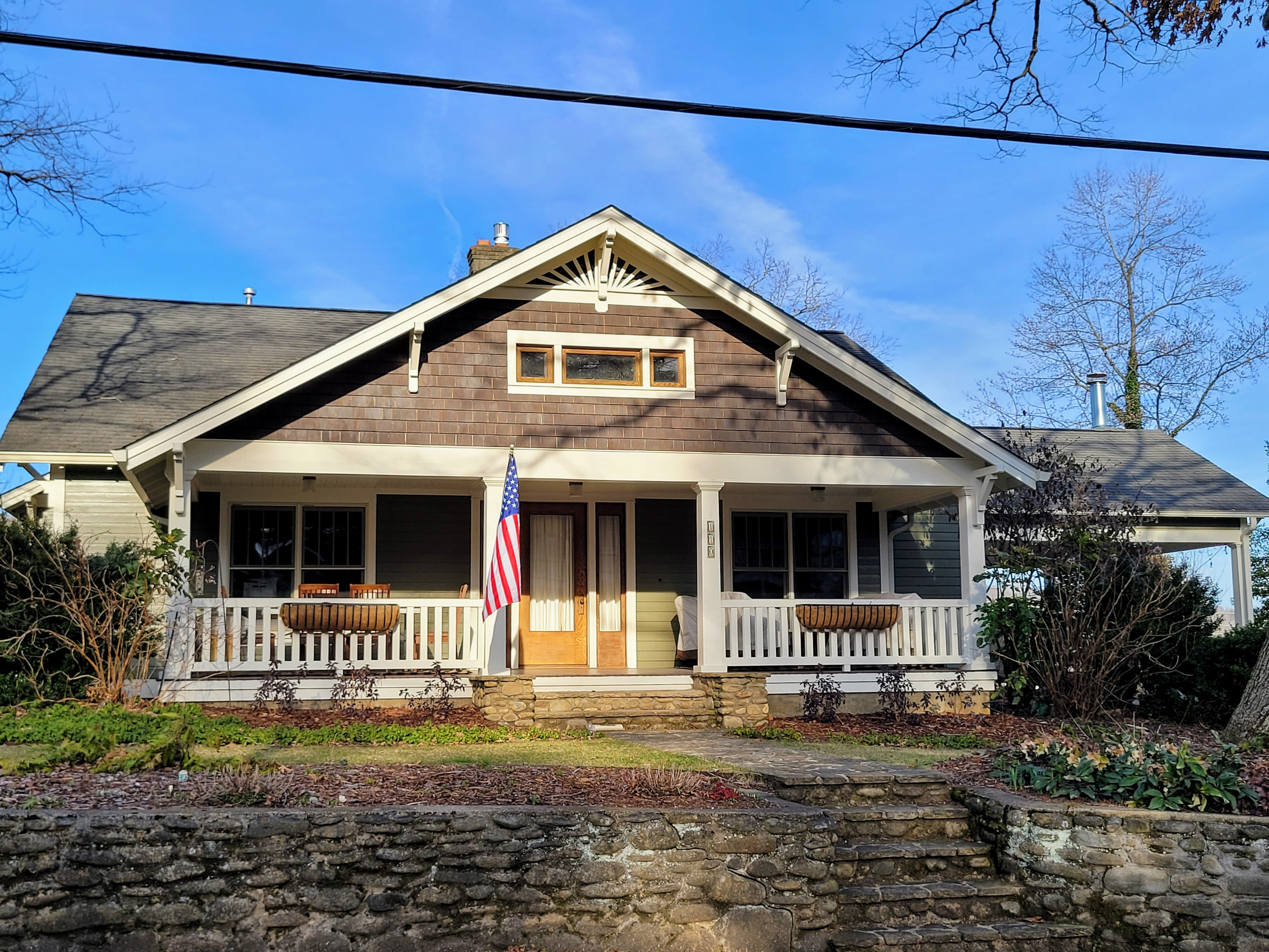
110 Church Street, 2022
