= Matt Lutz =

American actor

- Born: Matthew Christopher Lutz; October 15, 1978 (age 47); Anderson, Indiana, U.S.
- Education: University of North Carolina Wilmington (BA)

Matthew Christopher Lutz (born October 15, 1978) is an American film, television, and theater actor.

== Early life and education ==
Lutz was born in Anderson, Indiana, and moved with his family to Phoenix, Arizona, at the age of seven. He graduated from Charles D. Owen High School in Black Mountain, North Carolina and earned a Bachelor of Arts degree in theatre from the University of North Carolina Wilmington.

== Career ==
Lutz portrayed Phil Newberry on the Hallmark Channel's McBride murder-mystery series and appeared in the feature films A Walk to Remember, Bringing Down the House, and End of the Spear.

As a solo recording artist, Lutz released his debut album entitled High Road in 2012. In 2017, it was announced that Lutz had been selected as the artistic director of the Black Mountain Center for the Arts.

== Filmography ==
=== Film ===
Year	Title	Role	Notes
2000	Hemingway's Ghost	Salesman	
2002	A Walk to Remember	Clay Gephardt	
2003	Bringing Down the House	Aaron	
2005	End of the Spear	Pete Fleming	
2009	Port City	David	

=== Television ===
Year	Title	Role	Notes
1998	Legacy	Ty Mitchell	Episode: "Tango"
1999	Dawson's Creek	Student	2 episodes
2001	Amy & Isabelle	Paul Bellows	Television film
2003	7th Heaven	Bob	Episode: "Back in the Saddle Again"
2003	Boston Public	Devin Rickman	Episode: "Chapter Fifty-Eight"
2003	Las Vegas	Fraternity Kid	Episode: "Luck be a Lady"
2004	Murder Without Conviction	Gene Wirth	Television film
2005	McBride: The Chameleon Murder	Phil Newberry	Television film
2005	McBride: Murder Past Midnight	Phil Newberry	Television film
2005	McBride: It's Murder, Madam	Phil Newberry	Television film
2005	McBride: The Doctor Is Out... Really Out	Phil Newberry	Television film
2005	McBride: Tune in for Murder	Phil Newberry	Television film
2005	McBride: Anybody Here Murder Marty?	Phil Newberry	Television film
2006	McBride: Fallen Idol	Phil Newberry	Television film
2006	McBride: Requiem	Phil Newberry	Television film
2007	McBride: Semper Fi	Phil Newberry	Television film
2007	McBride: Dogged	Phil Newberry	Television film
