= McBride (film series) =

- Genre: Mystery film
- Created by: Dean Hargrove
- Written by: Jeff Peters; Shelley Miller; Brian Clemens; Jamie Latta; Nicholas Hicks-Beach; Rachel Stuhler
- Starring: John Larroquette; Marta DuBois; Matt Lutz; Devon Gummersall; Maeve Quinlan; Dirk Blocker
- Country of origin: United States
- Original language: English
- No. of episodes: 10

Production
- Executive producers: Dean Hargrove; Larry Levinson; Robert Halmi Jr.
- Running time: 80-84 min. (excl. commercials)
- Production companies: Alpine Medien Productions; Larry Levinson Productions

Original release
- Network: Hallmark Channel
- Release: January 14, 2005 – May 31, 2008

McBride is a series of 10 made-for-television mystery films released by the Hallmark Channel between 2005 and 2008 and stars John Larroquette as a lawyer. It later appeared regularly on the Hallmark Movie Channel. It is broadcast some weekends on the Hallmark Drama Channel. While on the Hallmark Channel, it was broadcast in rotation with the movie series Jane Doe, Murder 101, and Mystery Woman under the umbrella title Hallmark Channel Mystery Wheel. In the UK, these movies are aired, on a rotation basis, in afternoon drama slot on Channel 5.

== Story ==
Lawyer Mike McBride is a curmudgeon with a heart of gold. He takes cases based on their merit rather than on their monetary value, which often leads to nagging notices from bill collectors. A disillusioned member of the LAPD, McBride left the force after 12 years and went back to school to become a lawyer. McBride, sidekick Phil Newberry, and McBride's former girlfriend Detective Roberta Hansen, solve crimes through investigation and research.

== Main characters ==
Mike McBride (John Larroquette) – McBride, although a lawyer for only eight years, is renowned in Los Angeles for his tough persona and commitment to his clients. Quirky and unconventional, his methods often draw negative attention from his peers, as well as a certain measure of dread from every ADA he must face in the courtroom. Larroquette himself decided that McBride should not have a first name and resisted using even an initial. The nameplate on his desk, however, says "M. McBride" and in the first movie, McBride's jury summons is briefly seen, noting that his first name is Mike. Later promos for the show also refer to him as Mike. He is more commonly known as "Mac". McBride has inherited a rundown ranch and a white dog, Jesse, from a client serving a life sentence.

Phil Newberry (Matt Lutz) – Phil is a former public defender who is fortunate enough to try a case in which McBride is a juror. Though Phil fails to convince the rest of the jury of his client's innocence, McBride's contrary vote is enough to hang the jury. Upon meeting face to face, Phil realizes he can learn much from this seasoned litigator and goes to work for McBride. Phil Newberry is often the "gadget guy", a post-modern counterpoint to McBride's old-fashioned sleuthing. In the first episode, he is revealed to have a trust fund and is willing to work without pay.

Roberta Hansen (Marta DuBois) – Roberta is a sharp-tongued homicide detective with the LAPD. She and McBride share a somewhat mysterious romantic past but have put aside their entanglement to work together as friends. Though sometimes at odds, McBride and Roberta respect and trust one another, often coming together to solve crimes everyone else has abandoned. In later episodes, Roberta's office moves from a roomier one in the corner of the police headquarters to one closer to the middle of the station. Though it is never explained in the story, the switch was made for shooting reasons because the corner office was more difficult to light.

== Films in the series ==
#	Title	Director	Original air date
1	McBride: Murder Past Midnight	Kevin Connor	January 14, 2005
2	McBride: The Chameleon Murder (Note: This was the only movie sold on DVD by Hallmark Home Video.)	Kevin Connor	February 4, 2005
3	McBride: It's Murder, Madam	Kevin Connor	March 4, 2005
4	McBride: The Doctor is Out ... Really Out	John Larroquette	June 12, 2005
5	McBride: Tune in for Murder	Stephen Bridgewater	August 14, 2005
6	McBride: Anybody Here Murder Marty?	James Contner	August 28, 2005
7	McBride: Fallen Idol	John Larroquette	March 11, 2006
8	McBride: Semper Fi	John Larroquette	January 20, 2007
9	McBride: Dogged	John Larroquette	March 17, 2007
10	McBride: Requiem	Mark Griffiths	May 31, 2008
