= McDibbs =

American bar

Coordinates: 35°37′0″N 82°19′15″W

McDibbs, a music house in Black Mountain, North Carolina pioneered the development of both the non-smoking bar, and the now thriving Asheville area music scene. David Peele founded McDibbs in the late 70's to showcase local talent. His innovations in running McDibbs eventually drew high-profile regional acts like Bela Fleck while retaining a rich bohemian vibe within the establishment. McDibbs reflected a community reminiscent of the Greenwich Village Folk Revival of the 1960s, and reflected a non traditional aesthetic. The community of musicians, artists, and storytellers viewed McDibbs as a cultural landmark that set the stage for the rise of the Asheville area's music and art scene. It was from this environment that current international acts like David Wilcox and Poetry Alive! began at McDibbs.

== Founding ==
McDibbs was founded in 1978 on Cherry Street in Black Mountain, North Carolina, which is just east of Asheville. Originally established at the former Wonk's Dymaxion Bar, McDibbs offered an immediate change of atmosphere.

McDibbs eventually moved to another location a few doors north to 119 Cherry Street. Moving into the former Anne's Café, a Black Mountain icon around for more than 40 years, McDibbs utilized friends of the community to construct and refurbish the location. Certain staple items in McDibbs were left over from Anne's Café, like the cookstove in the rear of the bar used to house anything from beer to paintings.

== Closing ==
David Peele decided to close McDibbs in 1992 in the interest of his family.

== Influence and legacy ==
Area businesses regard McDibbs atmosphere as the model for a successful music environment. In a dispute regarding area music establishments, The Mountain XPress printed this statement.

It [The Grey Eagle] was started with an attempt to create a McDibbs type of ambiance for the customers – both old and young. The first lessees, Edd and Lee Ann Knopka, ran a clean place with a friendly, receptive atmostphere, [hosting] a number of charitable events for the community, as we had requested of them.

The legacy of McDibbs' model is shown through the rise in the popularity of the Non-Smoking Bar in the Asheville area. Most notably emulating this model is The Orange Peel, The Grey Eagle, and Jack of The Wood. In November 2008 another music venue opened, using this model. White Horse Black Mountain www.whitehorseblackmountain.com, owned by Bob Hinkle www.bobhinkle.com, who was the former manager of Harry Chapin, Tom Chapin, the J. Geils Band, Etta James, Manfred Mann, Kenny Rogers, and Dottie West.

In 2011, McDibbs' founder David Peele and Don Talley (who operates a local music website called The Black Mountain Music Scene) launched a new concert series to honor the "listening room" legacy of McDibbs. The new series is called McDibbs Reunion and features past McDibbs performers.

Always an innovator, David Peele added a new twist to the new concert series. Past performers and McDibbs audience members play a role in creating the new series and are invited to create their own "reunion" events to celebrate the memory of McDibbs.

== National and international performers on the McDibbs stage ==
- Alex DeGrassi
- Andy Irvine
- Bela Fleck
- Bruce Molsky
- Cathy Fink
- Connie Regan-Blake (The Folktellers)
- Dan Crary
- David Holt
- David Wilcox
- De Dannan (Ireland)
- Doc Watson
- Gamble Rogers
- Gatemouth Brown
- George Hamilton IV
- Georgia Sea Island Singers
- Guy Carawan
- Indigo Girls
- Jerry Jeff Walker
- John Hartford
- John Sebastian
- John Fahey
- John McCutcheon
- Jonathan Edwards
- Kevin Burke
- Kristen Hall
- Leon Redbone
- Livingston Taylor
- Maura O'Connell
- Mick Maloney (Ireland)
- New Grass Revival
- Norman Blake
- Peter Rowan
- Poetry Alive!
- Taj Mahal
- Rare Air
- Red Clay Ramblers
- Robin and Linda Williams
- Rosalie Sorrels
- Roy Book Binder
- Tannahill Weavers
- Tom Paley
- Tom Paxton
- Tony Trischka
- Townes Van Zandt
- Vassar Clements

== Other regional and national performers on the McDibbs stage ==
- Jim Bickerstaff & Bruce Crichton
- Pete Neff
- Malcolm Holcombe
- Hobey Ford and The Goldenrod Puppets
- Phil and Gaye Johnson
- Wayne Erbsen
- Bill Melanson
- Annie Lalley
- A D Anderson
- Chris Blair
- Joe and Karen Holbert
- Tracy Drach
- The Breeze (Chris Blair, Jon Clegg, Nils Peterson, John Rogers)
- Tom Draughon
