= Stepp Branch (Swannanoa River tributary) =

Stream in North Carolina, USA

Stepp Branch Tributary to Swannanoa River
- Location of Stepp Branch mouth Stepp Branch (Swannanoa River tributary) (the United States)

Location
- Country: United States
- State: North Carolina
- County: Buncombe

Physical characteristics
- Source: side of Jesses High Top in Lytle Cove
  - location: about 1.5 miles south of Grovestone, North Carolina
  - coordinates: 35°35′06″N 082°21′27″W
  - elevation: 3,440 ft (1,050 m)
- Mouth: Swannanoa River
  - location: Grovestone, North Carolina
  - coordinates: 35°36′09″N 082°22′18″W
  - elevation: 2,218 ft (676 m)
- Length: 1.61 mi (2.59 km)
- Basin size: 0.7 square miles (1.8 km^{2})
- Discharge
  - location: Swannanoa River
  - average: 1.13 cu ft/s (0.032 m^{3}/s) at mouth with Swannanoa River

Basin features
- Progression: Swannanoa River → French Broad River → Tennessee River → Ohio River → Mississippi River → Gulf of Mexico
- River system: French Broad River
- Tributaries
  - left: unnamed tributaries
  - right: unnamed tributaries
- Bridges: Land of Lane, Cornerstone Way, Lytle Cove Road Ext, I-40, US 70

Stepp Branch is a 1.61 mi (2.59 km) long 1st order tributary to the Swannanoa River in Buncombe County, North Carolina.

== Course ==
Stepp Branch rises about 1.5 miles south of Grovestone, North Carolina in Buncombe County at the base of Jesses High Top. Stepp Branch then flows northwest to meet the Swannanoa River at Grovestone.

== Watershed ==
Stepp Branch drains 0.7 square miles (1.8 km^{2}) of area, receives about 48.0 in/year of precipitation, has a topographic wetness index of 285.56 and is about 71% forested.
