= Monte Vista Hotel (Black Mountain, North Carolina) =

Historic hotel in North Carolina, US

- U.S. National Register of Historic Places
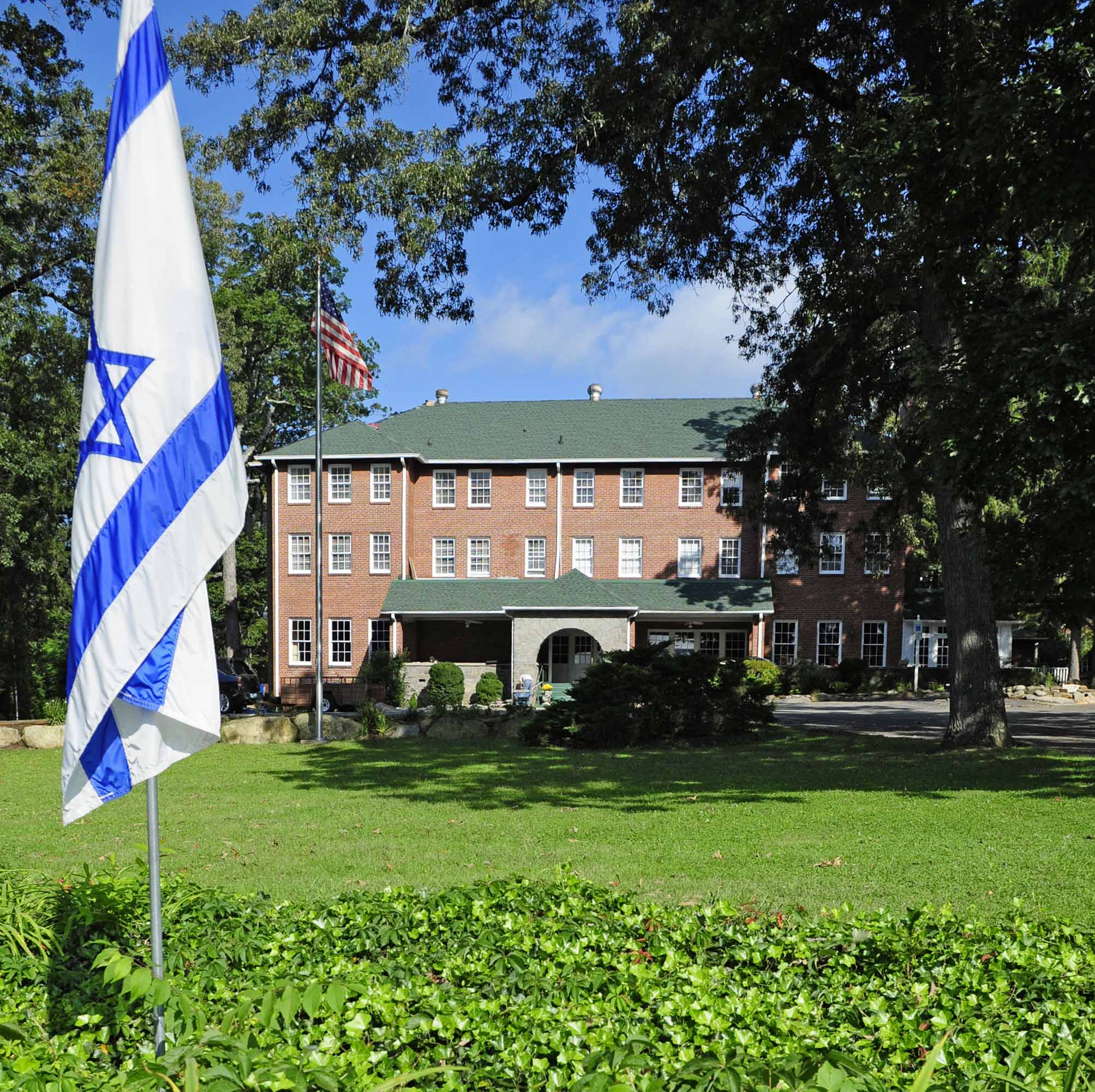
- Monte Vista Hotel, September 2012

- Location within North Carolina Location within the United States
- Location: 308 W. State St., Black Mountain, North Carolina
- Coordinates: 35°36′55″N 82°19′21″W
- Area: 2.6 acres (1.1 ha)
- Built: 1937, c. 1940, 1980
- Built by: Dougherty, C.C.
- Architect: Alexander, S. Grant
- Architectural style: Colonial Revival
- NRHP reference No.: 08000366
- Added to NRHP: April 30, 2008

Monte Vista Hotel is a historic hotel building located at Black Mountain, Buncombe County, North Carolina. It was built in 1937, and is a three-story, L-shaped Colonial Revival style brick building with a hipped roof. A six-room, one-story addition was built about 1940 that connects, by an enclosed breezeway, to a 16-room, one-story, L-shaped annex added in 1980. Also on the property is a contributing two-story, frame farmhouse (c. 1926).

It was listed on the National Register of Historic Places in 2008.
