= David Wilcox (American musician) =

American folk musician and singer-songwriter guitarist (born 1958)

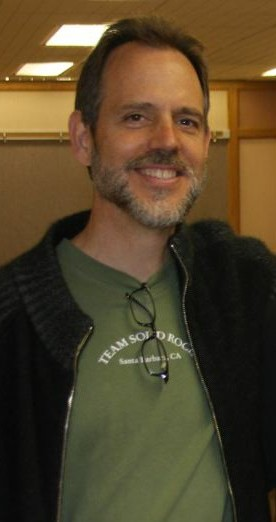
- Wilcox in 2007

Background information
- Born: March 9, 1958 (age 68); Mentor, Ohio, U.S.
- Genre: Singer-songwriter
- Years active: 1988–present
- Labels: A&M Records, What Are Records?, Vanguard Records, Koch International, Fresh Baked Records
- Website: davidwilcox.com

David Patrick Wilcox (born March 9, 1958) is an American folk musician and singer-songwriter guitarist. He has been active in the music business since the late 1970s.

== Career ==
Wilcox was born in Mentor, Ohio, and attended Antioch College in Yellow Springs, Ohio, in 1976, where he began learning guitar. He later transferred to Warren Wilson College in North Carolina in 1981 and graduated in 1985. Wilcox appeared regularly at a Black Mountain, North Carolina, nightclub called McDibbs.

His debut album The Nightshift Watchman was released in 1987 on Jerry Read Smith's label, Song of the Woods, and was reissued in 1996. He began touring regularly. After performing at the Bluebird Cafe in Nashville, he signed with A&M Records in 1989. He made several albums with this label. His albums were described by one Rolling Stone critic as "unjustly neglected". After his contract with A&M expired in 1994, Wilcox continued to write songs, tour and release albums. In 1994, he performed at Carnegie Hall with thirty other singer-songwriters in a showcase event. Wilcox also appeared on the cover of Acoustic Guitar, which described him as James Taylor combined with the "husky breathiness more reminiscent of the late Nick Drake" and said he was the "best known of the brilliant crop of singer-songwriters to emerge in the late 1980s." He was based in Asheville, North Carolina in the 1990s, in Washington, D.C., and Maryland in 1999–2000, and again in Asheville in 2009.

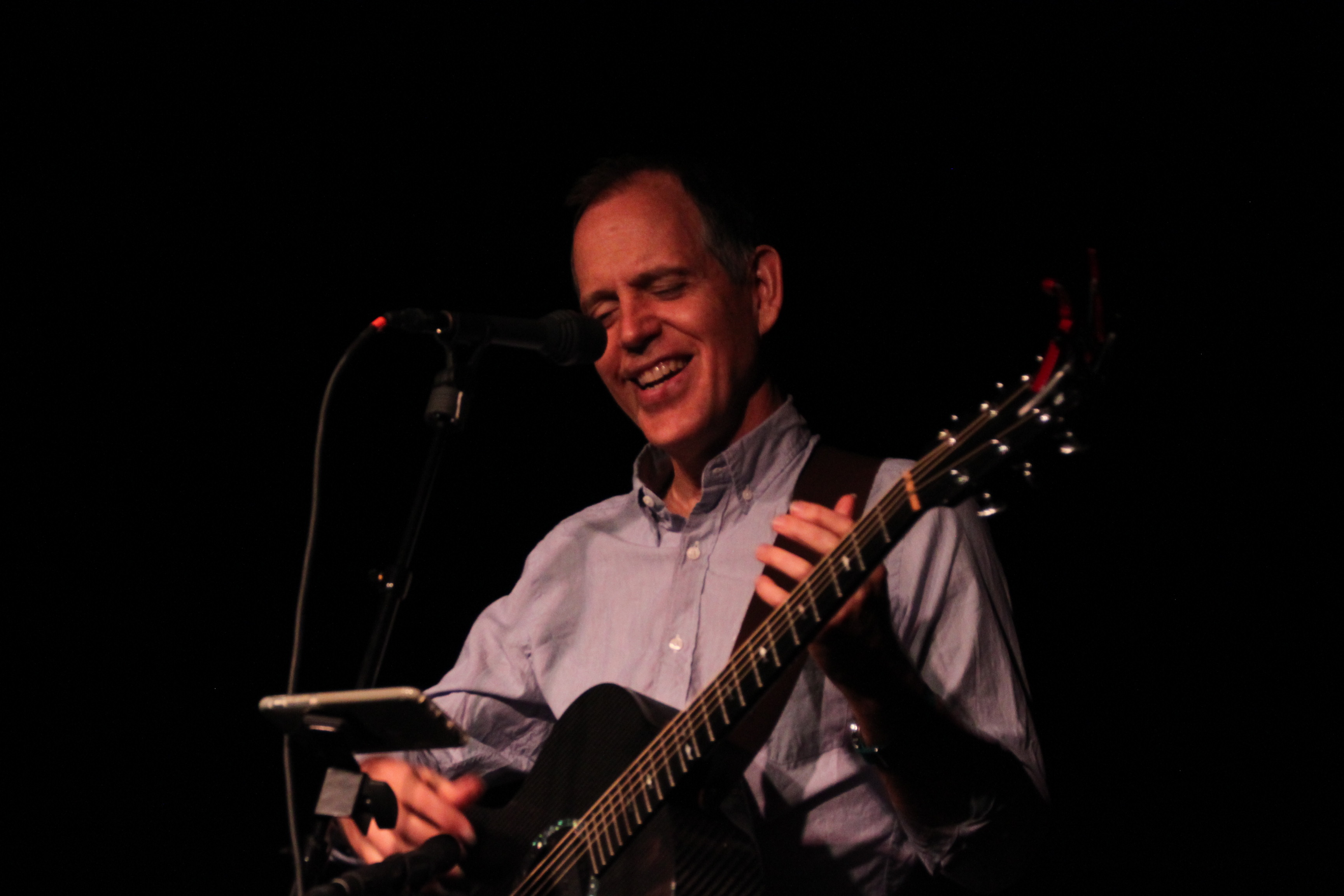
David Wilcox performing in Richmond, Virginia in 2016

In the next decade, Wilcox continued releasing albums, including Into the Mystery in 2003. He has been a guest artist at guitar workshops. His lyrics are sometimes of the "probing meaning-of-life" type, as well as "thought-provoking".

Wilcox plays acoustic guitars made by Olson Guitars. His fingerstyle playing, which is similar to Nick Drake and Joni Mitchell, extensively uses open tuning, often in combination with customized capos with notches cut out to allow lower strings to ring open. He has been featured in Performing Songwriter magazine on five occasions.

About his approach to music:

Music is about all the different kinds of feelings we can have – we can be scared, we can be angry, we can be hopeful, we can be sad. We can be all these things and have company in it. Music is sacred ground and it shouldn't be reduced to that kind of simplified demographic target-marketing.

— David Wilcox, 1998

The song has to offer something universal. I want songs that people can understand the first time... I write songs with layers in them, so they stay interesting over the years.

— David Wilcox, 1999

His 2005 album Out Beyond Ideas was a joint project with his wife Nance Pettit, described as a significant diversion from prior work, featuring sacred poetry set to music from different religious traditions, including Saint Francis of Assisi, Jalaludin Rumi, Shams-ud-din Muhammad Hafiz, Rabia al Basri, Yehuda Halevi, Solomon Ibn Gabirol, Uvavnuk, and Kabir.

During 2005 Wilcox traveled the country with his wife and teen-aged son in an Airstream trailer attached to a bio-diesel truck. He named one of his albums Airstream. His album Vista was released in April 2006.

In 2008 Wilcox was honored with a silver award along with Bob Dylan, in Acoustic Guitar's singer-songwriter category.

His Open Hand, produced by Seattle-based guitarist and producer Dan Phelps, was released in March 2009. Wilcox and Phelps were joined by longtime Tori Amos bassist Jon Evans and drummer James McAlister.

Wilcox is sometimes confused with Canadian rock and blues guitarist David Wilcox.

Although his albums have had diverse arrangements, Wilcox generally performs as a soloist. He has released 16 albums.

Wilcox performed a benefit concert in Westfield, New Jersey for Coffee With Conscience in late spring of 2008.

He recently played a duet with James Landfair, a critically acclaimed folk musician based out of Little Rock, Arkansas, of Buddy Mondlock's song "The Kid." It was published on YouTube on February 21, 2013.

He won top honors in the 23rd Annual USA Songwriting Competition (2018) with his song "We Make The Way By Walking". He also won First Prize in the Folk category in the competition.

He has received criticism and accusations of bigotry, racism and xenophobia from those who do not appreciate the intent of his 2010 song "We Call It Freedom" which is written ironically to appear to support torture of prisoners in the war on terrorism.

In 2019 he covered "Why We Build The Wall" from Hadestown.

== Critical reception ==
A New York Times music critic wrote Wilcox has a "handful of sterling folk-pop songs, a genial voice and enough guitar virtuosity to make even his lesser material sound convincing." Another described him as a prolific songwriter and folk artist. Another wrote that he "sings with a mellow fluency that suggests a hybrid of Mr. Taylor and Kenny Rankin, but he has better enunciation than either." Critics describe his voice as having a "warm, expressive" quality with an "engaging vocal style" and a "warm, baritone vocal tone."

His music has been described as "deeply philosophical" and "insightful". One music critic wrote he was an "influential acoustic guitarist... the PBS darling of contemporary singer-songwriter folk." Another critic wrote that an "eager, unapologetic sincerity flows from the heart of David Wilcox's acoustic music," and elaborated that "Wilcox uses extended metaphors and beautifully detailed imagery in lyrics that are far more compassionate and philosophic than self-absorbed... Indeed, as steeped in romance as most popular music is, it rarely speaks directly to issues of loneliness, intimacy and commitment – let alone mortality and inner fortitude. Wilcox does this with sensitivity, analytic zeal and subtle emotional force."

Many of his songs analyze the dynamics of relationships in epigrammatic verses that are at once earnest and gently humorous. While many of Mr. Wilcox's songs have light blues inflections, occasionally they also look back in spirit to Tin Pan Alley. My Old Addiction, one of the most striking songs in his first set on Thursday, was a wry, wistful meditation on the tug of an old relationship that echoed Georgia on My Mind.

— Music critic Stephen Holden in The New York Times, 1992

Many critics compare his style to James Taylor as well as Joni Mitchell and John Gorka. A Rolling Stone critic suggested Wilcox's best album was How Did You Find Me Here, which was released in 1989.

One critic sensed Wilcox had a "boyish sensitivity" with "something to say about love, relationships and life" which is sung with "insight, humor and moments of profundity." However, the critic felt Wilcox needs to "get some excitement into his music and voice... His even-keel, generic style of singing, playing and music-writing isn't enough to keep the focus of the modern short attention span" and his songs lack "musical distinctiveness." Wilcox is a "poet/storyteller first, a songwriter/player second".

== Discography ==
Music by David Wilcox
Album	Year	Label	Billboard 200 (sales chart)	Folk Radio (airplay chart)	Notes	References
My Good Friends	2023	Self-Released				
The View From The Edge	2018	Self-Released				
blaze	2014	What Are Records?				
Mixtape, 1979–1982	2011	Self-Released			download only album	
Live at Eddie's Attic	2011	Self-Released			download only album	
Reverie	2010	What Are Records?		No. 30		
Open Hand	2009	What Are Records?		No. 3		
Airstream	2008	What Are Records?		No. 20		
Vista	2006	What Are Records?		No. 14		
Out Beyond Ideas	2005	What Are Records?		No. 28	with wife Nancy Pettit	
Into the Mystery	2003	What Are Records?		No. 18		
Live Songs and Stories	2002	What Are Records?				
The Very Best of David Wilcox	2001	A&M				
What You Whispered	2000	Vanguard		No. 53		
Underneath	1999	Vanguard		No. 13		
Turning Point	1997	Koch, reissued on What Are Records?		n/a	recorded in log cabin behind his home	
East Asheville Hardware	1996	Fresh Baked/Koch, reissued on What Are Records?		n/a		
Big Horizon	1994	A&M	No. 165	n/a		
Home Again	1991	A&M		n/a		
Mostly Live: An Authorized Bootleg	1991	A&M		n/a		
How Did You Find Me Here	1989	A&M		n/a	sold over 100,000 copies by word of mouth	
Nightshift Watchman	1987	Song of the Wood (1996 reissue by Fresh Baked/Koch)		n/a		
