= North Fork Swannanoa River =

Stream in North Carolina, US

North Fork Swannanoa River Tributary to Swannanoa River
- Location of North Fork Swannanoa River mouth North Fork Swannanoa River (the United States)

Location
- Country: United States
- State: North Carolina
- County: Buncombe

Physical characteristics
- Source: divide between North Fork Swannanoa River and Cane River
  - location: about 0.5 miles south of Walker Knob
  - coordinates: 35°44′36″N 082°20′08″W
  - elevation: 4,800 ft (1,500 m)
- Mouth: Swannanoa River
  - location: Grovestone, North Carolina
  - coordinates: 35°36′16″N 082°22′07″W
  - elevation: 2,224 ft (678 m)
- Length: 11.27 mi (18.14 km)
- Basin size: 31.75 square miles (82.2 km^{2})
- Discharge
  - location: Swannanoa River
  - average: 72.01 cu ft/s (2.039 m^{3}/s) at mouth with Swannanoa River

Basin features
- Progression: Swannanoa River → French Broad River → Tennessee River → Ohio River → Mississippi River → Gulf of Mexico
- River system: French Broad River
- Tributaries
  - left: Glassmine Branch; Stony Fork; Right Fork Swannanoa River; Long Branch; Chestnut Cove; Big Cove; Walker Branch
  - right: Shadepan Branch; Saltrock Branch; Left Fork Swannanoa River; Sugar Springs Cove; Sugar Fork; Shute Branch; Laurel Branch; Fall Branch; Granny Cove
- Waterbodies: Burnett Reservoir
- Bridges: North Fork Right Fork Road, Old US 70

The North Fork Swannanoa River is a 11.23-mile-long (18.07-kilometre) third-order tributary to the Swannanoa River in Buncombe County, North Carolina.

== Course ==
North Fork Swannanoa River rises about 0.5 miles south of Walker Knob in Buncombe County on the Cane River divide. The stream then flows south-southwest to meet the Swannanoa River at Grovestone, North Carolina. It is impounded at Burnett Reservoir, which is part of the City of Asheville's water supply.

== Watershed ==
North Fork Swannanoa River drains 31.75 square miles (82.2 km^{2}) of area, receives about 55.62 in/year of precipitation, has a topographic wetness index of 272.84 and is about 89% forested.
