= South Montreat Road Historic District =

Historic district in North Carolina, United States

- U.S. National Register of Historic Places
- U.S. Historic district
- Location within North Carolina Location within the United States
- Location: Along Montreat Rd., 102 First St., 100 Third St., 100 Ninth St., and 101 Beech St., Black Mountain, North Carolina
- Coordinates: 35°37′23″N 82°19′15″W
- Area: 14 acres (5.7 ha)
- Built: c. 1900
- Architectural style: Colonial Revival, Bungalow/Craftsman, Neoclassical
- NRHP reference No.: 10001056
- Added to NRHP: December 27, 2010

South Montreat Road Historic District is a national historic district located at Black Mountain, Buncombe County, North Carolina. The district encompasses 34 contributing buildings in a predominantly residential section of Black Mountain. The district includes a variety of early-20th century dwellings in the Colonial Revival, American Craftsman, and Neoclassical styles. The district is characterized by a mix of primarily one- and two-story frame houses on small lots.

It was listed on the National Register of Historic Places in 2010.

== Gallery ==
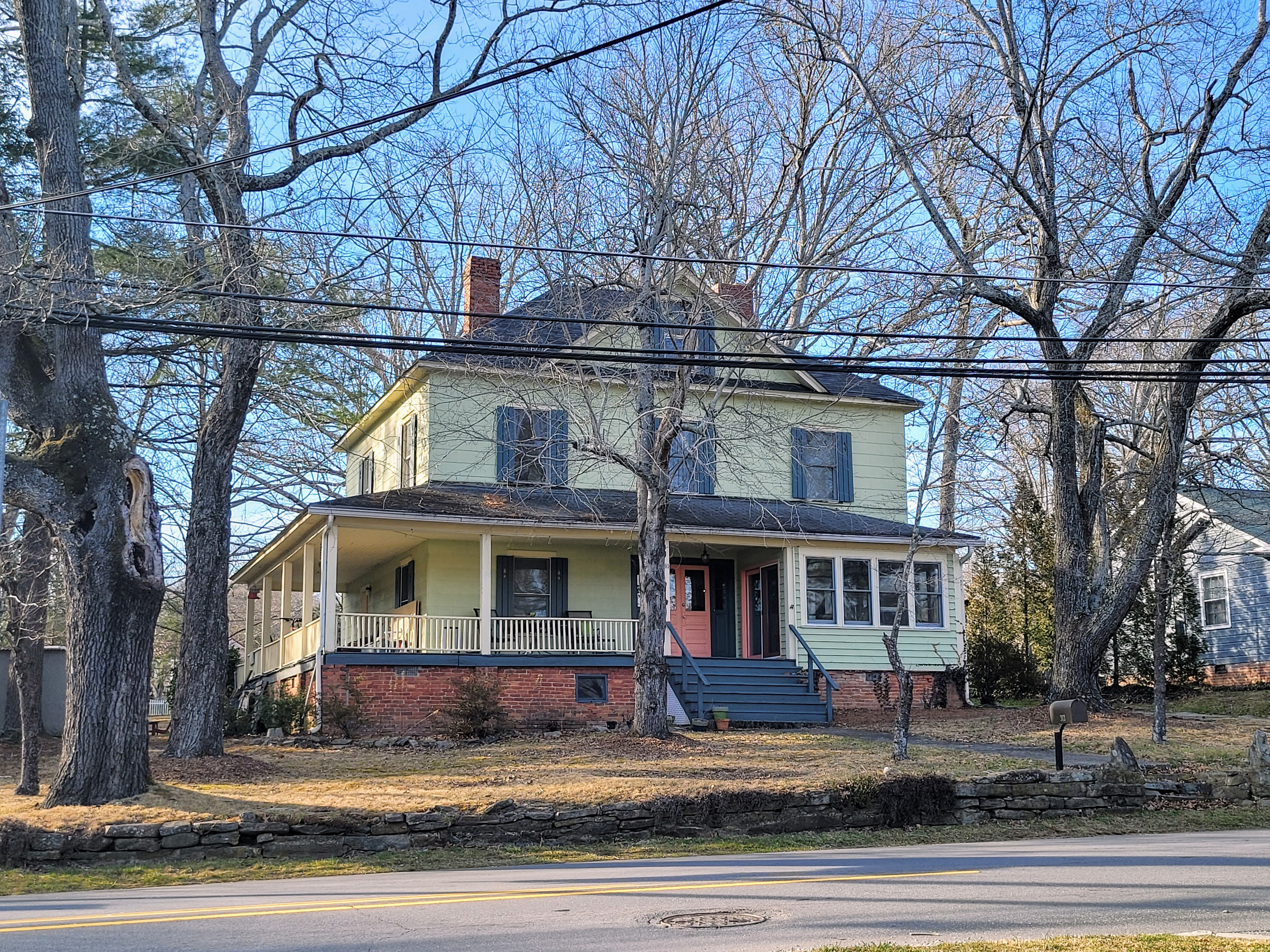
303 Montreat Road, 2022

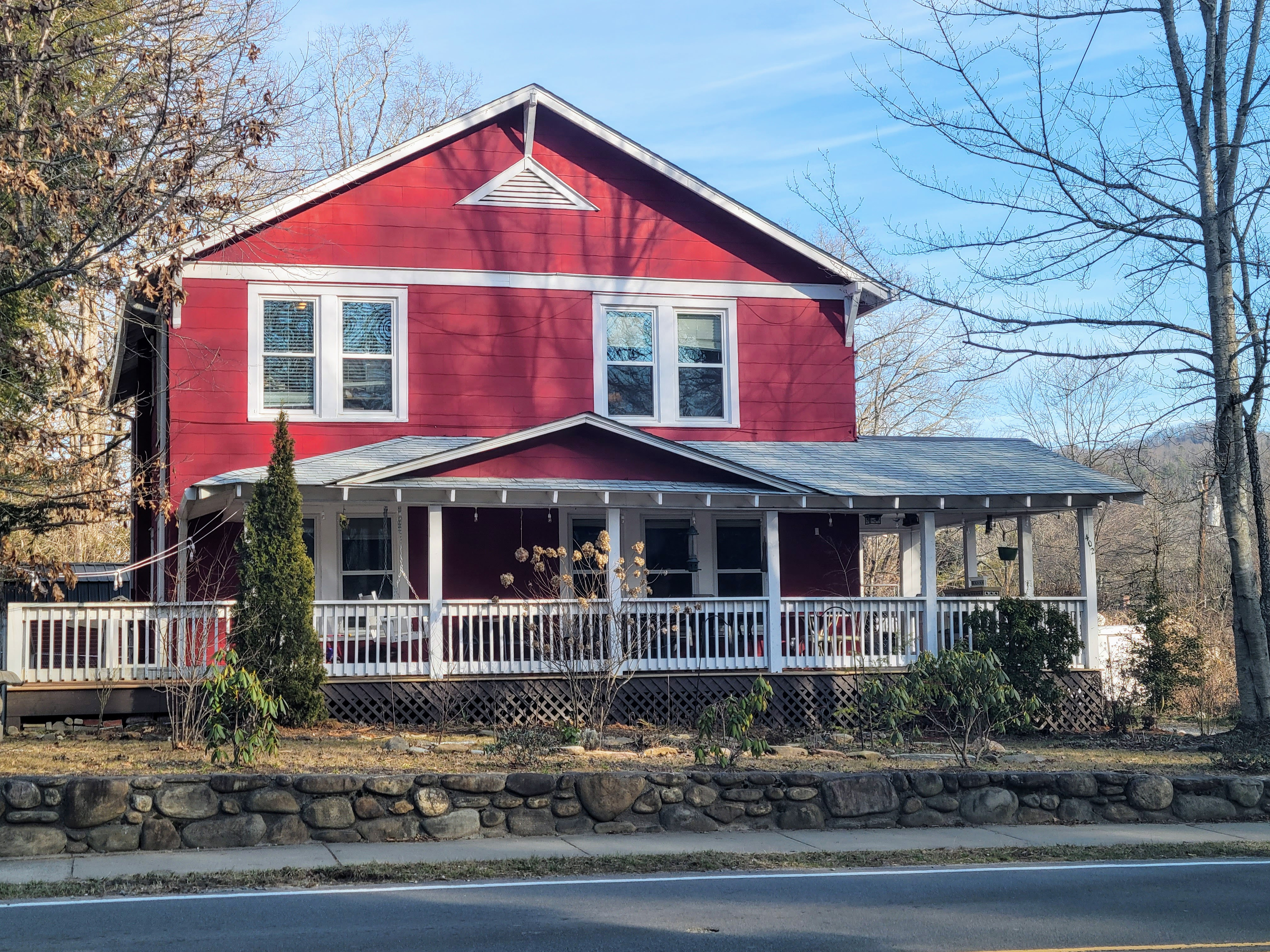
402 Montreat Road, 2022

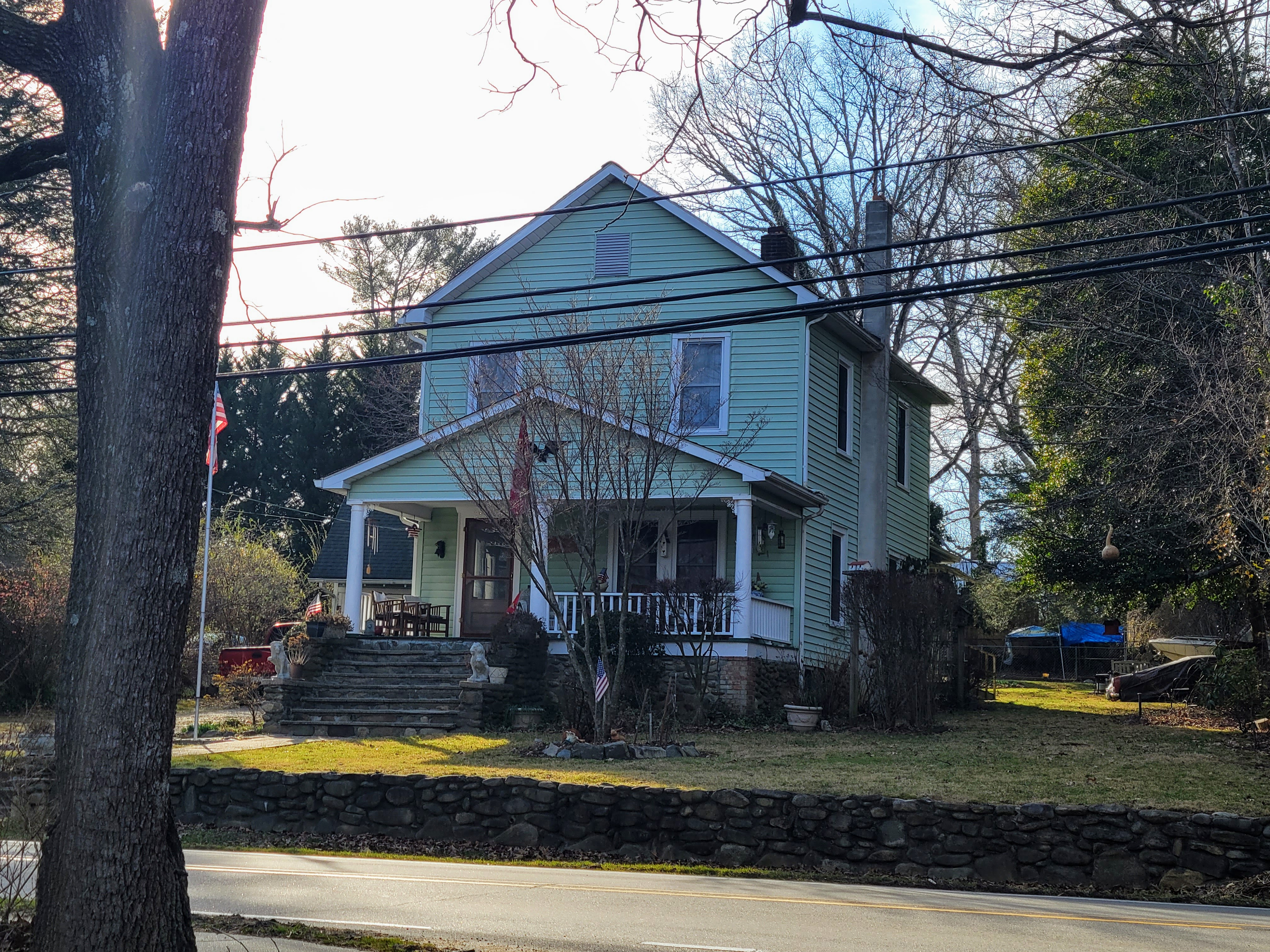
L. L. Hines House, 2022
