= Black Mountain Center for the Arts =

Arts center in Black Mountain, North Carolina

Black Mountain Center for the Arts (BMCA) is a nonprofit community arts center located in Black Mountain, North Carolina. The Center opened in 2000 and is located in the former Black Mountain city hall building. It offers musical, visual, and performing arts programming, including concerts, theatre productions, art exhibits, and classes.
