= Beetree Creek (Swannanoa River tributary) =

Stream in North Carolina, USA

Beetree Creek Tributary to Swannanoa River
- Location of Beetree Creek mouth Beetree Creek (Swannanoa River tributary) (the United States)

Location
- Country: United States
- State: North Carolina
- County: Buncombe

Physical characteristics
- Source: divide between Beetree Creek and Mineral Creek
  - location: about 0.5 miles southeast of Bearpen Knob
  - coordinates: 35°41′42″N 082°23′35″W
  - elevation: 4,520 ft (1,380 m)
- Mouth: Swannanoa River
  - location: about 1 mile northwest of Swannanoa, North Carolina
  - coordinates: 35°36′39″N 082°25′30″W
  - elevation: 2,139 ft (652 m)
- Length: 8.05 mi (12.96 km)
- Basin size: 13.99 square miles (36.2 km^{2})
- Discharge
  - location: Swannanoa River
  - average: 22.83 cu ft/s (0.646 m^{3}/s) at mouth with Swannanoa River

Basin features
- Progression: Swannanoa River → French Broad River → Tennessee River → Ohio River → Mississippi River → Gulf of Mexico
- River system: French Broad River
- Tributaries
  - left: Right Fork Beetree Creek; Wolfe Branch; Spruce Fork
  - right: Bell Branch; Left Fork Beetree Creek; Long Branch; Gregg Branch
- Waterbodies: Beetree Reservoir
- Bridges: Bee Tree Road (x3), Highland Ridge Road, Berkie Lane, Old Beetree Road, Warren Wilson College Road

Beetree Creek is a 8.05 mi (12.96 km) long 2nd order tributary to the Swannanoa River in Buncombe County, North Carolina.

== Course ==
Beetree Creek rises about 0.5 miles southeast of Bearpen Knob in Buncombe County. Beetree Creek then flows south then southwest to meet the Swannanoa River about 1 mile northwest of Swannanoa, North Carolina.

== Watershed ==
Beetree Creek drains 13.99 square miles (36.2 km^{2}) of area, receives about 49.6 in/year of precipitation, has a topographic wetness index of 264.89 and is about 92% forested.
