= Lake Swannanoa, New Jersey =

Populated place in Morris County, New Jersey, US

Coordinates: 41.0106°N 74.5201°W

Lake Swannanoa vintage postcard

Lake Swannanoa is a residential lake community located within Jefferson Township, in Morris County, in the U.S. state of New Jersey. It is within the scenic Skylands Region and approximately 38 miles (61 km) by road from New York City.

== Geology and hydrology ==
The lake has two main sections, connected by a strait. The lake is an impoundment of Russia Brook, a tributary of the Rockaway River. There are also two ponds. There is an island in the north lake called Snake Island. A smaller island, Turtle Island, is indistinguishable from the shoreline at this time.

The lake has two man-made dams, one for each section of the lake. The south dam has a spillway and valve, the north dam has a large valve and overflow spillway. The dams were both rehabilitated in 1998 from the original Ringling-era fieldstone and concrete construction.

The south dam was upgraded in 2013 to meet NJDEP Dam Safety & Flood Control requirements. This was as a direct result of an unusual meteorological event, the August 2000 storm. This storm arrived and did not move for over a day, dumping 14 inches (official measurement, independent estimates say 16+ inches) of rain to a restricted area. The resultant flooding caused the main thoroughfare Berkshire Valley Road to become inundated, but did not cause either dam to fail. Excessive overflow caused some undermining of the dam structure which has since been corrected. The lake was previously under orders of the New Jersey Department of Environmental Protection (NJDEP) to maintain a water level of no greater than two and no less than three feet below spillway until the repair was completed.

Due to the large watershed, the lake both enjoys and is cursed with a high flow-through rate. The water in the lake is replaced approximately every 30–45 days. This allows for water refreshment, but makes aquatic weed treatment more challenging.

== Historical information ==
Post-Native-American settlement, the area was mostly farmland.

=== Alfred T. Ringling ===
The property was consolidated, the lake enlarged (and two lakes combined), and a 28-room manor house with auxiliary structures were built in the rustic neoclassical style to accommodate Ringling Brothers Circus impresario Alfred T. Ringling. The estate and its auxiliary structures served as winter quarters for the R.T. Richards Circus owned and operated by Ringling's son Richard T. Ringling. Geraldine Farrar sang for the famous guests of Mr. and Mrs. Alfred T. Ringling in the music room with its great organ and Tiffany stained glass window. Ringling's death in 1919 brought an end to this era.

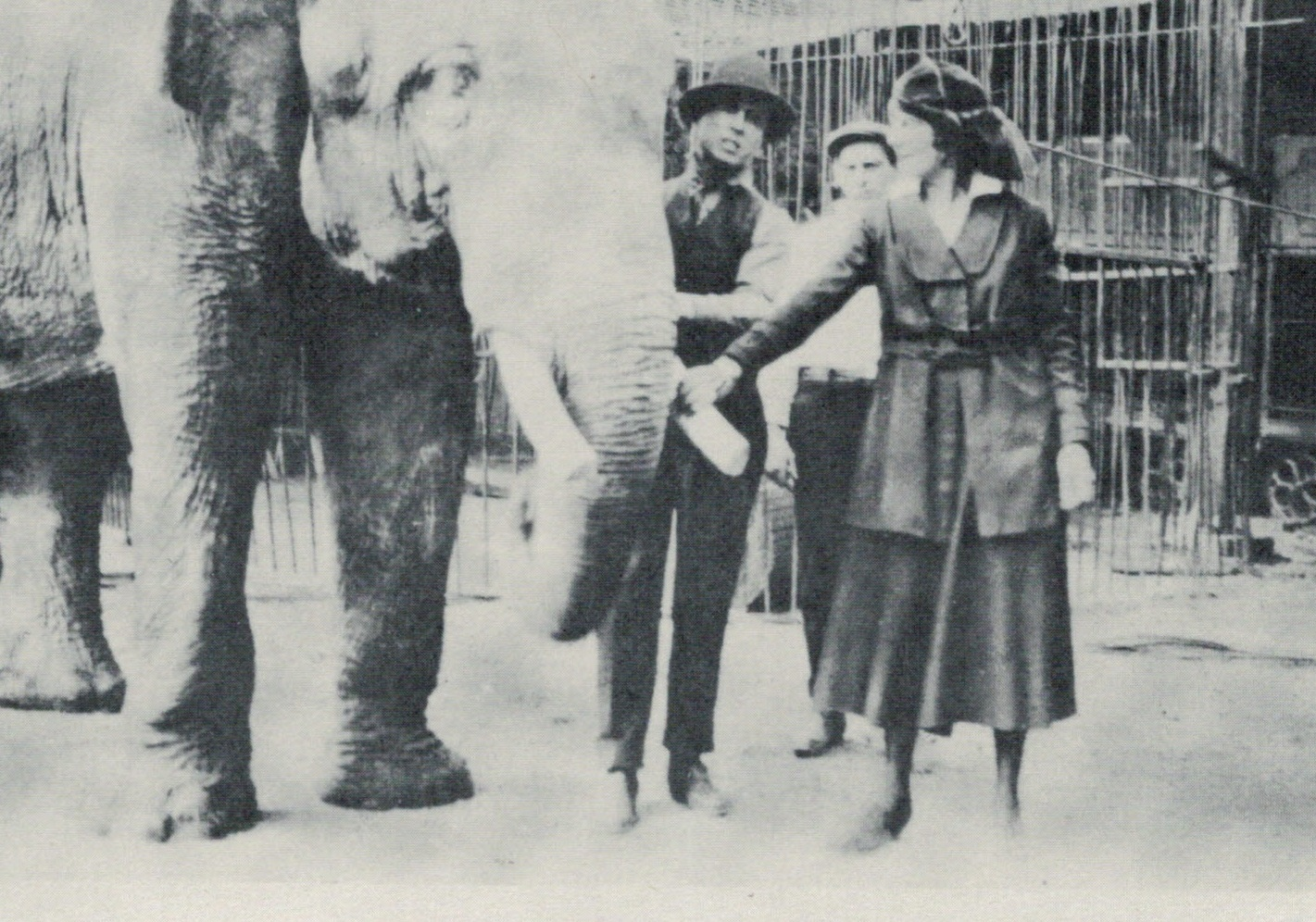
Peggy Winterbottom in the Alfred T. Ringling elephant barn. (Oak Ridge, NJ - April 1918)

The buildings are on the National Register of Historic Places. Although, the manor house has been privately owned by the St. Stanislaus Friary of the Polish Capuchins for many years, as of 2017, it is up for sale.

=== Becoming Lake Swannanoa ===
The Ringling estate was purchased by Arthur D. McAllister in 1925 and renamed Lake Swannanoa. Plans were created to develop a ritzy golf and country club, the original prospectus calling for elegant high society balls, and racial/ethnic restrictions. Due to the Great Depression this plan never came to fruition, so instead in the 1930s it was developed as a residential community by Ringling Estates Inc. Log cabin style houses were built on small lots as primarily summer homes, and were used as such throughout the 1950s. Although there are a few weekend residents today, most houses are now occupied full-time year-round. Many of the current houses are situated on multiple original lots.

The name Swannanoa is reported to be derived from the Cherokee word Suwali Nûⁿnâhi, the name for the Swannanoa Gap in North Carolina. However, the name was used in this case under the impression that the translation is actually "the beautiful trail." The street names within the development are all named after Native American tribes.

== Today ==
Lake Swannanoa (the lake, beach, and shoreline property, not the entire development) is privately owned and operated by the Lake Swannanoa Homeowners Association formerly known as the Swannanoa Sentinel Society, a private non-profit corporation. Membership is by deeded covenant. There is a fee to join the covenant, and yearly dues are assessed. Access to and use of the lake and property is by permit and restricted to members in good standing.
