= Blue Ridge Assembly Historic District =

Historic district in North Carolina, United States

- U.S. National Register of Historic Places
- U.S. Historic district
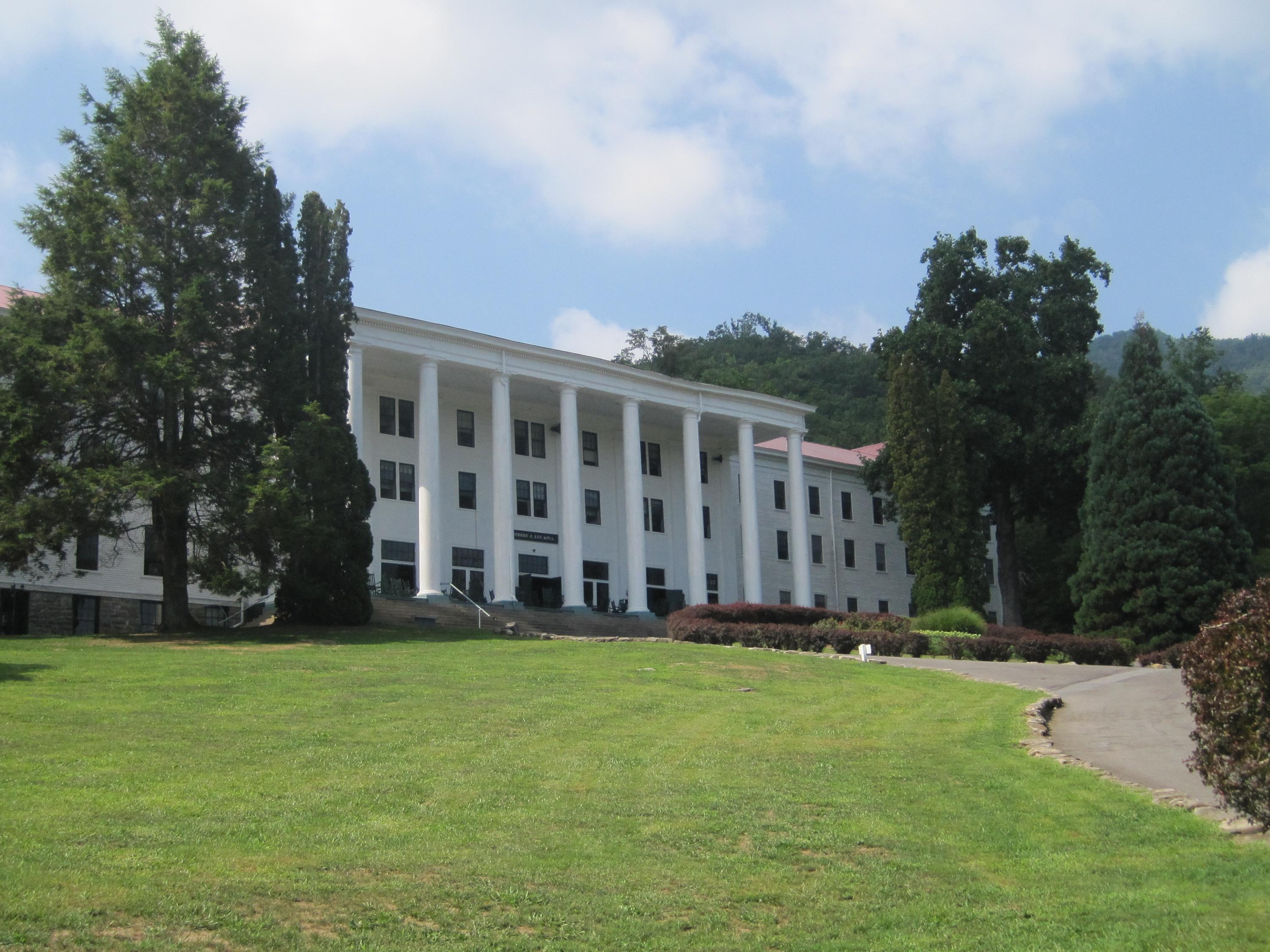
- Eureka Hall (originally Robert E Lee Hall), Blue Ridge Assembly, August 2010

- Location within North Carolina Location within the United States
- Location: S of Black Mountain on SR 2720, near Black Mountain, North Carolina
- Coordinates: 35°35′06″N 82°20′21″W
- Area: 22 acres (8.9 ha)
- Built: 1911-1912
- Architect: Jallade, Louis; et al.
- Architectural style: Colonial Revival, Classical Revival
- NRHP reference No.: 79003327
- Added to NRHP: September 17, 1979

Blue Ridge Assembly Historic District is a national historic district located near Black Mountain, Buncombe County, North Carolina. The district encompasses 29 contributing buildings and 1 contributing object associated with the Blue Ridge Assembly, conference center of the Young Men's Christian Association. The main building is Eureka Hall (originally named Robert E. Lee Hall, but renamed in 2015) designed by Louis E. Jallade. It was built in 1911–1912, and is a three-story, seven-bay, frame building with a full-height octastyle portico. Also located on the large central courtyard are the Gymnasium (c. 1915), Asheville Hall (1926), Abbott Hall (1927), and College Hall (c. 1928). Other notable buildings include the Martha Washington Residence (c. 1914), Craft and Child Care Center (c. 1925), and 19 frame cottages (1913–1927). Black Mountain College was founded here in 1933 and operated on the site until 1941.

It was listed on the National Register of Historic Places in 1979.
