= Swannanoa River =

Stream in North Carolina, USA

Swannanoa River Tributary to French Broad River
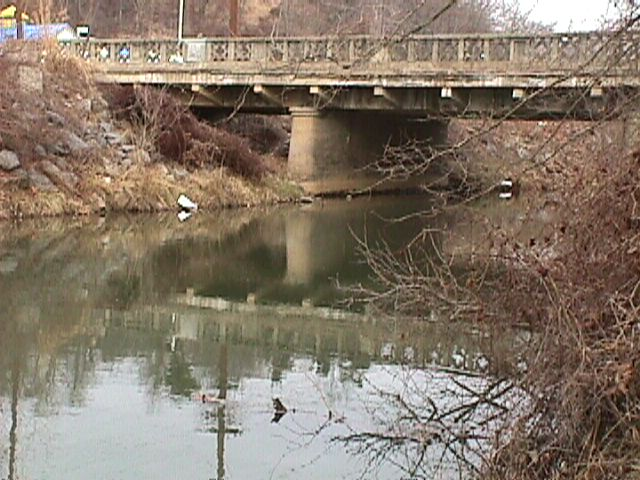
- Swannanoa River at Asheville, North Carolina

- Location of Swannanoa River mouth Swannanoa River (the United States)

Location
- Country: United States
- State: North Carolina
- County: Buncombe
- City: Black Mountain; Swannanoa; Asheville

Physical characteristics
- Source: divide between Swannanoa River and Catawba River
  - location: about 0.25 miles south of Swannanoa Gap
  - coordinates: 35°37′11″N 082°17′40″W
  - elevation: 2,790 ft (850 m)
- Mouth: French Broad River
  - location: Asheville, North Carolina
  - coordinates: 35°34′05″N 082°33′49″W
  - elevation: 1,968 ft (600 m)
- Length: 24.83 mi (39.96 km)
- Basin size: 132.77 square miles (343.9 km^{2})
- Discharge
  - location: French Broad River
  - average: 166.88 cu ft/s (4.726 m^{3}/s) at mouth with French Broad River

Basin features
- Progression: French Broad River → Tennessee River → Ohio River → Mississippi River → Gulf of Mexico
- River system: French Broad River
- Tributaries
  - left: Camp Branch; Wolfpit Branch; Stepp Branch; Gashes Creek; Christian Branch; Sweeten Creek; Ram Branch
  - right: Flat Creek; Tomahawk Branch; North Fork Swannanoa River; Beetree Creek; Bull Creek; Grassy Branch; Haw Creek; Ross Creek
- Bridges: Yates Avenue, Old US 70, Broadway Street, S Blue Ridge Road, I-40, US 70, Paton Hill Road, Riverwood Road, Davidson Road, Warren Wilson College Road, Tunnel Road (US 70), E Azalea Road, I-240, S Tunnel Road, Biltmore Avenue, Biltmore Estate Road

The Swannanoa River flows through the Swannanoa Valley of the region of Western North Carolina, and is a major tributary to the French Broad River. Its headwaters arise in Black Mountain, North Carolina; however, it also has a major tributary near its headwaters: Flat Creek, which begins on the slopes of Mount Mitchell. The Swannanoa River ends at its confluence with the French Broad, within the grounds of the 8,000-acre Biltmore Estate in Asheville.

The estate encompasses numerous ancient Native American sites, including an earthwork platform mound called Biltmore Mound, that is located south of the Swannanoa River. Based on evidence from excavations conducted there in the early 21st century, the mound was started by indigenous people between 400 and 550CE, with the second to last stage of the mound built about 580-600CE. It was built over a Connestee Phase habitation (built during the Pisgah phase) in the Middle Woodland period.

The historic Cherokee people occupied this area, which is part of their traditional homeland in this region. The mound has been identified as an area of feasting. The Cherokee called this site near the confluence Untokiasdiyi, meaning "where they race." They used it as a meeting place and area of competitive ritual games.

Under pressure from European-American settlers, the Cherokee ceded their land here in 1819. This site near the Swannanoa River was later abandoned and became overgrown. At one time there was plowing in the area, reducing the height of the mound, but it is distinguished by a much wider, oval-shaped base. The mound was rediscovered in 1984. It was first excavated in a more than two-year project by a team from Appalachian State University, beginning in 2000.

The river is 22 miles or 35 kilometers long, and it flows entirely within the geographical boundaries of Buncombe County. It is a valuable resource to the county, providing drinking water to the Asheville metropolitan area, and numerous recreational opportunities.

== Flooding events ==
In September 2004, severe rains from the remnants of Hurricanes Frances, Jeanne, and Ivan caused the Swannanoa to flood, causing major damage to the Biltmore Village section of Asheville and to the other communities that it flows through.

In September 2024, heavy rains from Hurricane Helene, which by then had diminished to a tropical storm, caused far more devastating floods along the river in Asheville and the communities of Black Mountain and Swannanoa. During this event, the river crested at 26.1 feet—slightly more than the 1791 record.

== Tributaries ==
(Not necessarily in order.)

- Sweeten Creek
- Ross Creek
- Haw Creek
- Gashes Creek
- Grassy Branch
- Christian Creek
- Bull Creek
- Beetree Creek
- Lower North Fork
- Upper North Fork
- Tomahawk Branch
- Flat Creek
- Camp Branch

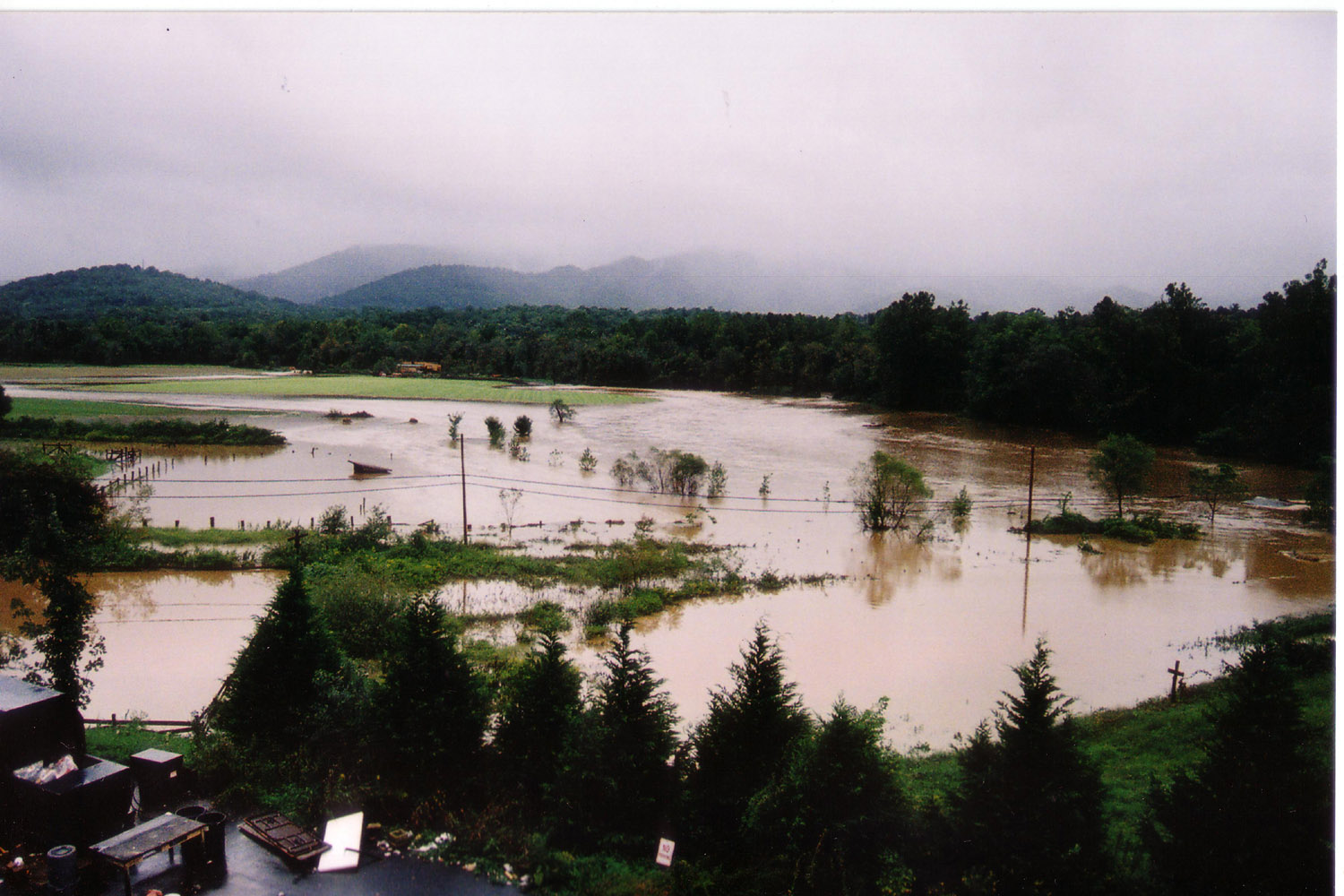
Swannanoa River flooding after Hurricane Frances, September 2004
