= Black Mountain, North Carolina =

Town in the United States

- Town
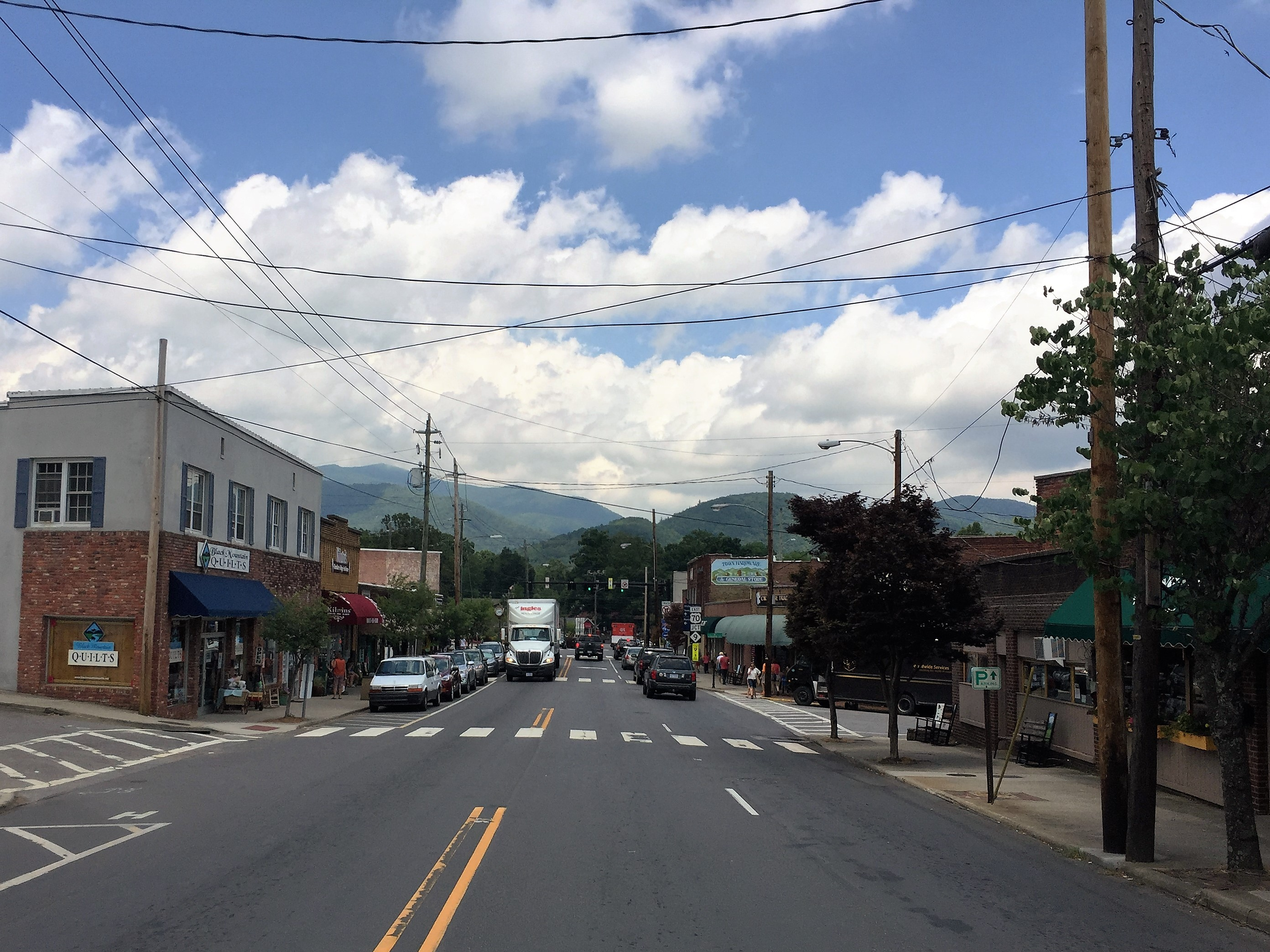
- A view down State Street in downtown Black Mountain

- Seal

- Location in Buncombe County and the state of North Carolina
- Coordinates: 35°36′51″N 82°19′39″W
- Country: United States
- State: North Carolina
- County: Buncombe
- Incorporated: March 4, 1893

Area
  - Total: 6.73 sq mi (17.42 km^{2})
  - Land: 6.71 sq mi (17.38 km^{2})
  - Water: 0.015 sq mi (0.04 km^{2})
- Elevation: 2,333 ft (711 m)

Population (2020)
  - Total: 8,426
  - Density: 1,255.5/sq mi (484.76/km^{2})
- Time zone: UTC-5 (Eastern (EST))
  - Summer (DST): UTC-4 (EDT)
- ZIP code: 28711
- Area code: 828
- FIPS code: 37-06140
- GNIS feature ID: 2405272
- Website: townofblackmountain.org

Black Mountain is a town in Buncombe County, North Carolina, United States. The population was 8,426 at the 2020 United States census. It is part of the Asheville metropolitan area. The town is named for the old train stop at the Black Mountain Depot and is located at the southern end of the Black Mountain range of the Blue Ridge Mountains in the Southern Appalachians.

== History ==
Black Mountain in its present form was incorporated on March 4, 1893. The first recorded inhabitants of the area were the Cherokee. A road was built through the area in 1850 and a railroad followed in 1879.

The Black Mountain College Historic District, Black Mountain Downtown Historic District, Blue Ridge Assembly Historic District, Dougherty Heights Historic District, Rafael Guastavino Sr., Estate, Intheoaks, Monte Vista Hotel, South Montreat Road Historic District, and Thomas Chapel A.M.E. Zion Church are listed on the National Register of Historic Places.

In September 2024, Black Mountain was severely impacted by flooding from Hurricane Helene. The town's power, water, and sewer systems went down for days. Roads and bridges were washed away. The headquarters and distribution center for the Ingles supermarket chain is based in Black Mountain. The company's local facilities were flooded, leading to mass closures, shortages, and payment processing issues at grocery stores across the chain.

== Geography ==
Black Mountain is located in eastern Buncombe County. The town of Montreat borders Black Mountain to the north, and the unincorporated community of Swannanoa is on the western border. U.S. Route 70 (State Street) is the main road through the center of town. Interstate 40 passes just to the south of downtown, with access from exits 64 and 65. Via I-40, it is 15 miles (24 km) west to Asheville and 41 miles (66 km) east to Morganton.

The Swannanoa River flows from east to west through the town, rising just 3 miles (5 km) to the east at Swannanoa Gap on the crest of the Appalachians. The Swannanoa River flows west to the French Broad River, part of the Tennessee River basin that ultimately flows to the Gulf of Mexico via the Mississippi River, while Swannanoa Creek east of the gap is part of the Catawba River-Santee River system, reaching the Atlantic Ocean north of Charleston, South Carolina.

According to the United States Census Bureau, the town of Black Mountain has a total area of 6.7 square miles (17.4 km^{2}), of which 0.015 square miles (0.04 km^{2}), or 0.23%, is water.

== Demographics ==
Historical population
Census	Pop.	Note	%±
1900	209		—
1910	311		48.8%
1920	531		70.7%
1930	737		38.8%
1940	1,042		41.4%
1950	1,174		12.7%
1960	1,313		11.8%
1970	3,204		144.0%
1980	4,083		27.4%
1990	5,418		32.7%
2000	7,511		38.6%
2010	7,848		4.5%
2020	8,426		7.4%
2025 (est.)	8,491	▲	0.8%
U.S. Decennial Census

=== 2020 census ===
As of the 2020 census, Black Mountain had a population of 8,426. The median age was 51.6 years. 16.1% of residents were under the age of 18 and 31.4% of residents were 65 years of age or older. For every 100 females there were 86.3 males, and for every 100 females age 18 and over there were 81.7 males age 18 and over.

98.8% of residents lived in urban areas, while 1.2% lived in rural areas.

There were 3,906 households in Black Mountain, of which 22.0% had children under the age of 18 living in them. Of all households, 42.5% were married-couple households, 16.8% were households with a male householder and no spouse or partner present, and 35.4% were households with a female householder and no spouse or partner present. About 36.9% of all households were made up of individuals and 21.3% had someone living alone who was 65 years of age or older.

There were 4,476 housing units, of which 12.7% were vacant. The homeowner vacancy rate was 2.0% and the rental vacancy rate was 5.4%.

Racial composition as of the 2020 census
Race	Number	Percent
White	7,269	86.3%
Black or African American	338	4.0%
American Indian and Alaska Native	34	0.4%
Asian	66	0.8%
Native Hawaiian and Other Pacific Islander	1	0.0%
Some other race	165	2.0%
Two or more races	553	6.6%
Hispanic or Latino (of any race)	373	4.4%

=== Demographic estimates ===
According to the American Community Survey 2021 5-year estimates, there were 3,928 households residing in the town. 17.5% had children under the age of 18 living with them, 49.2% were married couples living together, and 36.5% had a female householder with no husband present. 32.5% of all households were made up of individuals, and 26.1% had someone living alone who was 65 years of age or older. The average household size was 2.08 and the average family size was 2.66.

In the town, the population was spread out, with 14.9% under the age of 18, 2.5% from 18 to 24, 19.3% from 25 to 44, 25.4% from 45 to 64, and 37.8% who were 65 years of age or older. The median age was 57.5 years. For every 100 females, there were 67.6 males.

=== Income and poverty ===
The median income for a household in the town was $68,333, and the median income for a family was $85,262. The per capita income for the town was $20,509. About 4.6% of the population were below the poverty line, including 2.3% of those under age 18 and 3.0% of those age 65 or over.

=== 2000 census ===
As of the census of 2000, there were 7,511 people, 3,340 households, and 2,027 families residing in the town. The population density was 1,165.7 inhabitants per square mile (450.1/km^{2}). There were 3,703 housing units at an average density of 574.7 per square mile (221.9/km^{2}). The racial makeup of the town was 90.84% White, 6.27% African American, 0.31% Native American, 0.87% Asian, 0.04% Pacific Islander, 0.45% from other races, and 1.22% from two or more races. Hispanic or Latino of any race were 0.81% of the population.

There were 3,340 households, out of which 22.6% had children under the age of 18 living with them, 47.2% were married couples living together, 10.3% had a female householder with no husband present, and 39.3% were non-families. 34.7% of all households were made up of individuals, and 16.3% had someone living alone who was 65 years of age or older. The average household size was 2.15 and the average family size was 2.75.

In the town, the population was spread out, with 19.1% under the age of 18, 7.1% from 18 to 24, 25.7% from 25 to 44, 26.1% from 45 to 64, and 22.1% who were 65 years of age or older. The median age was 44 years. For every 100 females, there were 83.1 males. For every 100 females age 18 and over, there were 78.3 males.

The median income for a household in the town was $35,541, and the median income for a family was $43,373. Males had a median income of $28,604 versus $22,476 for females. The per capita income for the town was $20,509. About 7.6% of families and 10.1% of the population were below the poverty line, including 14.2% of those under age 18 and 7.6% of those age 65 or over.

== Events ==
- Lake Eden Arts Festival (LEAF)

== Government ==
The North Carolina Department of Public Safety (formerly the North Carolina Department of Corrections) operates the Swannanoa Correctional Center for Women. It opened on July 7, 2008, taking women previously at the Black Mountain Correctional Center for Women.

== Education ==
- Montreat College (Black Mountain)
- Black Mountain College (1933–1957)

Black Mountain College was formerly located near the town, but the Black Mountain College Museum + Arts Center, dedicated to the experimental educational institution's history, is now located in downtown Asheville. Black Mountain is also the site of the Swannanoa Valley Museum. The Black Mountain Center for the Arts is located down the street from the museum. In 2002 the community raised 1.2 million dollars to buy the old Town Hall and convert it into the Art Center.

== Media ==
Black Mountain News is a weekly newspaper covering Black Mountain and the Swannanoa Valley area.

== Notable people ==
Literary

- Patricia Cornwell
- William R. Forstchen
- Nicholas Sparks

Music

- McDibbs – music venue
- Bob Dalsemer – Internationally-known square and contra dance writer, musician, and caller
- Roberta Flack – singer, songwriter and musician
- Floating Action – (Seth Kauffman)
- The Jellyrox – (Matthew Langston)
- The Morris Brothers – country music group
- David Wilcox – singer-songwriter
- Artimus Pyle – drummer Lynyrd Skynyrd

Architecture

- Rafael Guastavino

Athletics

- Brad Daugherty – NBA player, 5x All-Star, ESPN and NBC Sports commentator, and NASCAR team owner
- Brad Johnson – NFL quarterback, 2x Pro Bowl selection, led the Tampa Bay Buccaneers to their Super Bowl XXXVII championship
- Sammy Stewart – MLB pitcher, 1983 World Series champion with the Baltimore Orioles
- Roy Williams – NCAA basketball coach

Religion

- L. Nelson Bell – missionary, Christianity Today founder
- Andrew Brunson – American pastor imprisoned in Turkey

Film, television, theater

- Matt Lutz – actor

Politicians

- Roy A. Taylor – congressman

Diplomats

- Philip S. Kosnett – Foreign Service Officer; U.S. Ambassador to the Republic of Kosovo 2018-2021

Other

- Regina Lynch-Hudson – publicist, travel writer, and historian

== In popular culture ==
Black Mountain is the site of the Three Billboards featured in the 2017 film, Three Billboards Outside Ebbing, Missouri, with one billboard exposed in April 2016, with the other two covered up.

Black Mountain is featured in the 2009 novel One Second After and its subsequent sequels by William R. Forstchen, a town resident. Many local institutions and residents appear in the novel, although the story itself is fictional.
