= Native American Guardians Association =

Non-profit organization

- Abbreviation: NAGA
- Formation: April 6, 2017; 9 years ago
- Founders: Mark Yellowhorse Beasley; Eunice Davidson; Andre Billeaudeaux; William Brotherton; Walt Brown
- Founded at: Annandale, Virginia
- Type: 501(c)(3) Corporation
- Tax ID no.: EIN 82-1240491
- Legal status: Charity
- Purpose: Native American History and Cultural Preservation
- Headquarters: Devils Lake, North Dakota
- Region served: United States
- Official language: English
- President: Anthony "Tony" Henson
- Vice-President: Frank Black Cloud
- Treasurer: David Davidson
- Secretary: Crystal Tso
- Board of directors: Jonathan Tso, David Finkenbinder, Demetrius Maraz, Jeffrey Charley, Eunice Davidson, Andre Billeaudeaux - Associate Board Member, Pretty Deer Eagleman, Chief Walt Brown III, Ivan A. Dozier, Mark Yellowhorse, Michael D. Larrañaga, Jeffery Charley, William Brotherton
- Website: www.nagaeducation.org

The Native American Guardians Association (NAGA) is an American Indian grassroots movement which was founded in June 2017 as a non-profit with the stated purpose of promoting Native American History and Preservation. Representatives of NAGA have primarily been active in debates over Native American mascots, opposing their removal both by providing non-Native opponents of change with talking points or by members giving testimony in support of mascot retention.

== Support for the Washington Redskins ==
Sports Illustrated (SI) investigated the various pro-Redskins organizations that spoke or wrote on behalf of Daniel Snyder in court, and found that most were receiving multi-thousand dollar donations from the Washington Redskins Original Americans Foundation (WROAF), which was founded by Snyder. Specifically, SI found that NAGA received $68,360 from WROAF shortly before an amicus curiae the group made in favor of retaining the Redskins name went public. The report stated that "direct ties between NAGA and Snyder's team are hard to find, but indirect ties are rampant" citing executive board member Mark Yancy's lack of Native American blood. NAGA says it is funded through donations from private donors, and the group does not disclose who made donations so a connection to WROAF would be obscured. Persons interviewed by SI called encounters with the group "disturbing" as they have "no ties to the communities they tried to lobby, but also because some [members] are aggressive."

In July 2023 a Washington Commanders fan started a Change.org petition asking that the team name be changed back to Redskins. Subsequently, news reports began attributing the petition to NAGA, followed by reports that NAGA would start a boycott similar to that affecting Anheuser-Busch. This prompted a response from new Commanders president Jason Wright stating that a change back to the Redskins "is not being considered. Period" as well as the Commanders issuing a statement that Bud Light is the official beer of the team. The National Congress of American Indians stated that it is encouraged by Wright's statement reflecting the continued effort to leave the past behind. In September 2023 NAGA filed a suit in the U.S. District Court of North Dakota against the Commanders for defamation due to their employees calling NAGA a fake group; and for conspiring to violate NAGA's civil rights. The judge dismissed the case in April 2024 based upon lack of jurisdiction, the defendant not being located in or doing business in the state.

== High school mascots ==
=== Skowhegan High School ===
In February 2019, the Skowhegan Area High School board voted to retire its mascot, the "Indians", in favor of the "River Hawks", being the last school in Maine with a Native American themed mascot.

Prior to the vote, NAGA contacted one of the School Board members opposed to the name change, Jennifer Poirir, offering its assistance. A private, invitation-only event was scheduled in February 2019 for only those supporting keeping the name. Maulian Dana, a tribal ambassador for the Penobscot Nation and supporter of changing the name, called it a "racist echo chamber." On Facebook, Sherri Mitchell, an indigenous-rights attorney in Maine, called NAGA "fake Indians" being paid by the Washington Football Team to promote native mascots. However, the leadership of NAGA includes several members of Native American tribes.

Local members of the Wabanaki Confederacy protested the presentations that NAGA gave to the school board, stating that the presence of Indians from other tribes breaks an "oral tradition" of Native Americans only "speak[ing] for your own nation." The Wabanaki protesters also said that NAGA had "an aggressive reputation" and that "they have no right to be here."

=== Killingly High School ===
In June 2019, the board of education of Killingly High School in Connecticut retired their mascot, the Redman, citing concerns that it was racist and offensive to Native Americans. In the subsequent election that November, a Republican majority was elected and subsequently voted 5–4 to reinstate the mascot (one Republican voted with the Democrats against the measure). Several members closed their statements with the motto of NAGA, "Education, not eradication." However, critics said that the organization is a fringe group that does not represent the views of most Native Americans. Two members of the youth council of the Mashantucket Pequot Tribal Nation, 30 miles away from Killingly, told the board "Redmen" is a slur that does not honor them.

=== Colorado ===
In 2021, the State of Colorado passed a law banning the use of references to Native Americans in any way as a mascot for any school, public, private, or charter, unless the school had entered an agreement with a specific Native American tribe prior to the laws passing. NAGA sued the state of Colorado and would be represented by the Mountain States Legal Foundation.

A member of the governor's commission, Darius Smith (Navajo), says that NAGA does not have credibility or represent the way many American Indians feel about the issue. In May 2022, the judge dismissed the suit on the basis of NAGA having failed to establish standing to bring the case.

=== Arizona ===
Eric Descheenie (Navajo) was asked in 2021 if he would favor a bill that would be similar to those in Nevada and Colorado banning Native mascots in schools. In 2018, as a member of the Arizona House of Representatives, Descheenie had introduced a bill to outlaw the display of team names that tribes deemed disparaging in publicly funded facilities, but that bill was never assigned to a committee, and stated that such legislation had no chance in the Republican-dominated Arizona legislature in 2021. Members of NAGA were also asked about legislation eliminating mascots, and replied that it is an erasure of Native American culture and legacy within the state. Descheenie replied that Native culture is not substantiated by representation in contemporary society such as mascots, but by history that precedes the existence of the United States.

=== New York State ===
NAGA has been cited by those opposed to the New York State law requiring high schools to change their mascots or lose state funding. US Education Secretary Linda McMahon has stated that if the ban on Native mascots is not lifted, she will ask the DOJ to investigate the State of New York for a civil rights violation under Title VI of the Civil Rights Act of 1964. McMahon cites NAGA as an indicator of Native American support for these mascots, but local Long Island tribal leaders from the Shinnecock and Poospatuck-Unkechaug who support the ban said they feel hurt by NAGA's intrusion. "If you want to learn about the true history of the Native people here, talk to us," said Chief Harry Wallace, of the Unkechaug Indian Nation.

== Support for Columbus Day ==
Eunice Davidson, the then-President of Native American Guardian's Association wrote a guest editorial in the Italian-American Herald in 2024 in support of Columbus Day. There have been efforts by Indigenous activists to replace Columbus Day with Indigenous Peoples Day. NAGA also collaborated with the Civic Committee of Italian Americans in 2024 in support of the Chicago Columbus Parade. NAGA's participation in the parade received a rebuke from the Chicago American Indian Community Collaborative, made up of 16 Indigenous organizations in Illinois, saying, "The collaboration of the Joint Civic Committee of Italian Americans and the Native American Guardian Association (NAGA) gives an erroneous impression that the Native American Community of Chicago and Illinois are in support of Columbus Day. Nothing can be further from the truth," "The Chicago and Illinois Native American community does not support the recognition of Columbus Day nor the work of the Native American Guardian Association in representing our local interests. Many of their members are simply individuals who do not have the authority to speak on behalf of their tribal nation and certainly not the Chicago and Illinois Native American Community." "Our Native American community celebrates all Italian Americans and their contributions to our country, but we cannot support the negative impact and legacy of Christopher Columbus."
