= Washington Commanders =

NFL team in the Washington, D.C., area

- Current season
Logo	Wordmark
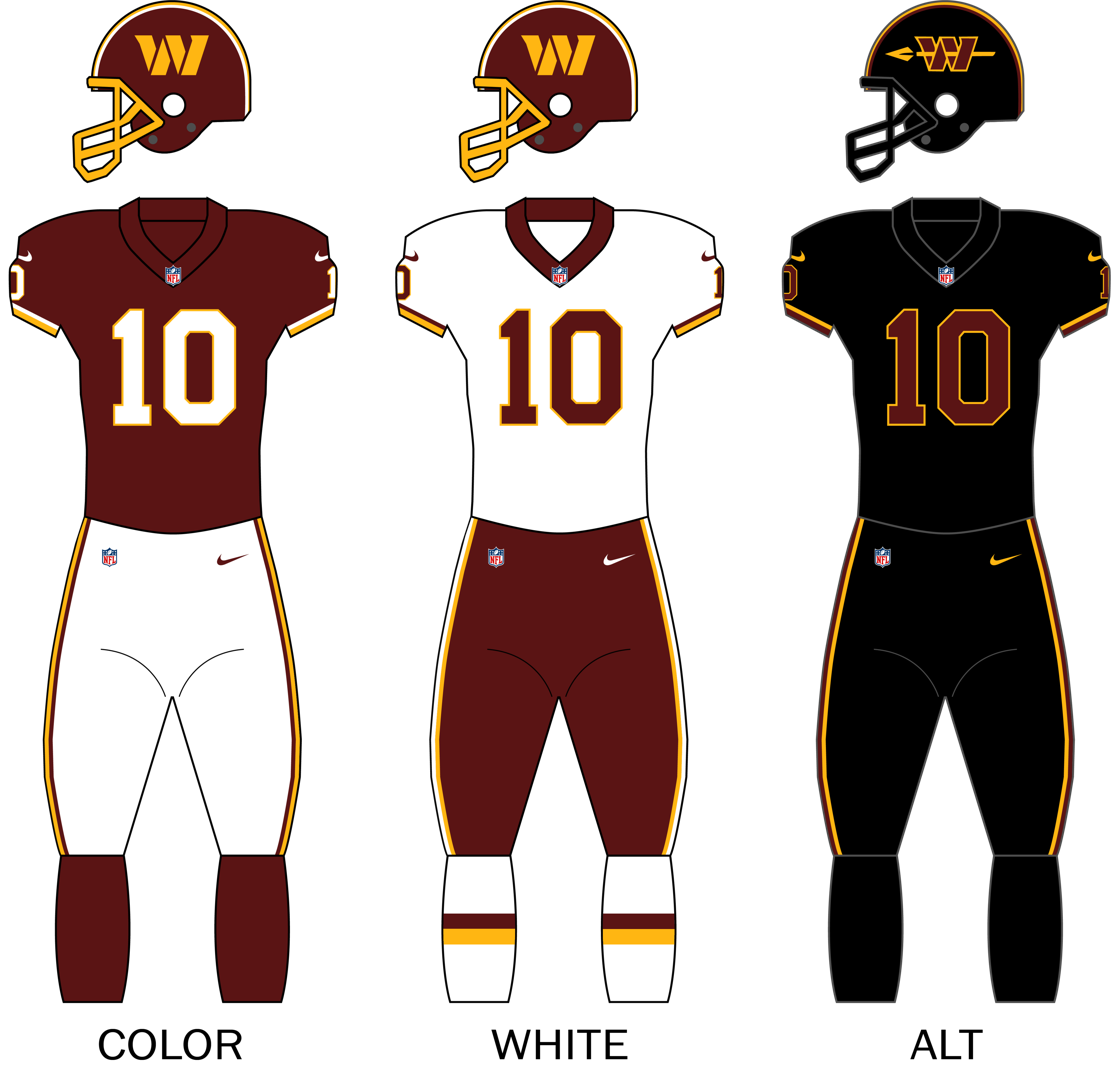
- Uniforms

General information
- Founded: July 9, 1932; 94 years ago
- Stadium: Northwest Stadium; Landover, Maryland
- Headquartered: Ashburn, Virginia (Note: BigBear.ai Performance Center at Commanders Park)
- Colors: Burgundy, gold, white, black
- Fight song: "Hail to the Commanders"
- Mascot: Major Tuddy
- Website: commanders.com

Personnel
- Owner: Josh Harris
- General manager: Adam Peters
- Head coach: Dan Quinn
- President: Mark Clouse

Nicknames
- The Burgundy and Gold; The 'Skins (as the Redskins); The Over-the-Hill Gang (1970s); The Fun Bunch (1980s receiving group); The Hogs (1980s offensive line)

Team history
- Boston Braves (1932); Boston Redskins (1933–1936); Washington Redskins (1937–2019); Washington Football Team (2020–2021); Washington Commanders (2022–present)

Home fields
- Braves Field (1932); Fenway Park (1933–1936); Griffith Stadium (1937–1960); RFK Stadium (1961–1996); Northwest Stadium (1997–present); New Stadium at RFK Campus (c. 2030)

League / conference affiliations
- National Football League (1932–present): Eastern Division (1933–1949); American Conference (1950–1952); Eastern Conference (1953–1969); Capitol Division (1967–1969); National Football Conference (1970–present); NFC East (1970–present)

Championships
- League championships: 5: Pre-merger NFL championships: 2 1937, 1942; Super Bowl championships: 3 1982 (XVII), 1987 (XXII), 1991 (XXVI)
- Conference championships: 5: NFC: 1972, 1982, 1983, 1987, 1991
- Division championships: 15: NFL Eastern: 1936, 1937, 1940, 1942, 1943, 1945; NFC East: 1972, 1983, 1984, 1987, 1991, 1999, 2012, 2015, 2020

Playoff appearances (26)
- 1936, 1937, 1940, 1942, 1943, 1945, 1971, 1972, 1973, 1974, 1976, 1982, 1983, 1984, 1986, 1987, 1990, 1991, 1992, 1999, 2005, 2007, 2012, 2015, 2020, 2024

Owners
- George Preston Marshall (1932–1965); Edward Bennett Williams (1965–1979); Jack Kent Cooke (1979–1997); John Kent Cooke (1997–1999); Daniel Snyder (1999–2023); Josh Harris (2023–present)

The Washington Commanders are a professional American football team based in the Washington D.C. metropolitan area. The Commanders compete in the National Football League (NFL) as a member of the National Football Conference (NFC) East division. The franchise was founded by George Preston Marshall as the Boston Braves in 1932, were renamed the Boston Redskins the following year, and became the Washington Redskins upon moving to Washington, D.C., in 1937. The Redskins name and logo drew criticism for decades before they were retired in 2020 as part of a wave of name changes during a period of racial unrest in the United States. The team played as the Washington Football Team for two seasons before rebranding as the Commanders in 2022.

The Commanders play their home games at Northwest Stadium in Landover, Maryland, and have a headquarters and training facility in Ashburn, Virginia. The team will begin playing at the New Stadium at RFK Campus in 2030. The Commanders have played more than 1,300 games and have won more than 600. Washington was among the first NFL franchises with an original fight song, "Hail to the Commanders", which has been played by their marching band after home game touchdowns since 1937. The franchise won NFL championships in 1937 and 1942 and Super Bowls XVII (1982), XXII (1987), and XXVI (1991). The Commanders have finished a season as league runner-up six times, losing the 1936, 1940, 1943, and 1945 title games and Super Bowls VII (1972) and XVIII (1983). Washington has 14 NFC East division titles and 26 total playoff appearances.

All of Washington's championships were attained during two 10-year spans. From 1936 to 1945, the team went to the NFL Championship six times, winning two of them under general manager Jack Espey and head coach Ray Flaherty. Washington appeared in four Super Bowls and won three under owner Jack Kent Cooke, general managers Bobby Beathard and Charley Casserly, and head coach Joe Gibbs from 1982 to 1991. From 1946 to 1970, Washington posted just four winning seasons and never reached the playoffs. They went without a single winning season from 1956 to 1968 and achieved their worst regular season record, 1–12–1, in 1961. Since their last Super Bowl victory in 1991, the team has won just five playoff games and four division titles.

== History ==
=== George Preston Marshall era (1932–1965) ===
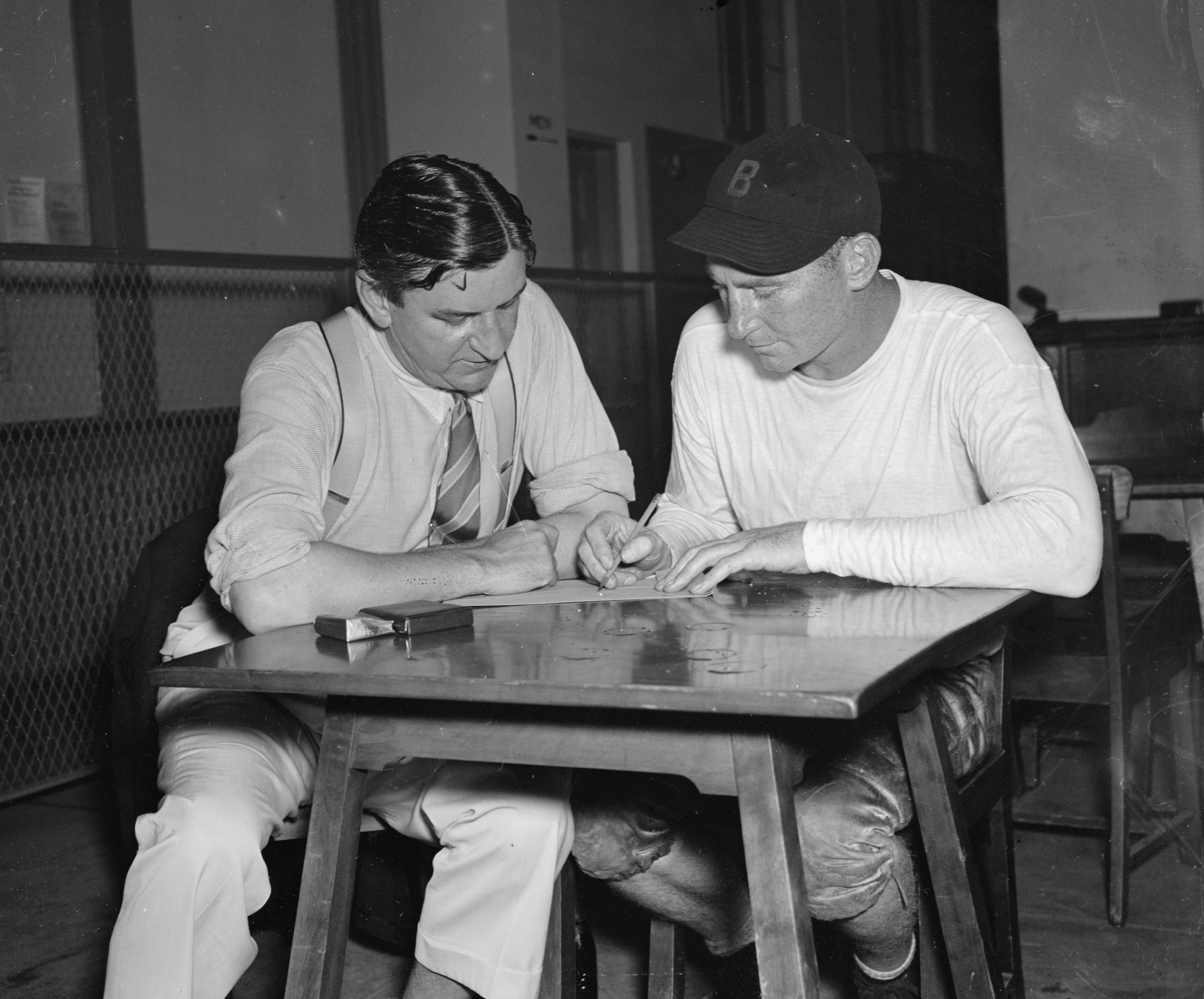
Team founder George Preston Marshall with head coach Ray Flaherty, 1937

American businessman George Preston Marshall founded a National Football League (NFL) franchise on July 9, 1932, in Boston, Massachusetts. The team was named after the Boston Braves baseball team, with whom they shared Braves Field, with the inaugural season coached by Lud Wray. The team saw several changes in 1933, including a name change to the "Redskins" and playing their home games at Fenway Park, home of the Boston Red Sox. Wray was also replaced as head coach by Lone Star Dietz.

The situation faced by Marshall in Boston was difficult. In 1935, Joe F. Carr opined: "To the casual observer bred in the knowledge of New England's place in football's sun, because its cradle and nursery were there, the success of a Boston team in the professional ranks would be a foregone conclusion. Nothing could have been more erroneous. Boston finished the most forbidding ground for professional football of any large city in the country. The history of the game in Boston and New England was entirely associated with college, preparatory, and high school playing. Its eminence as an institution of sport grew in a hallowed atmosphere as an almost sacrosanct element of education which was to be kept ever free from commercial pollution." The Redskins appeared in the 1936 NFL Championship Game, their first championship appearance, but lost to the Green Bay Packers 21–6.

After five years in Boston, which Marshall said showed a lack of interest in the team, the Redskins moved to Washington, D.C., in 1937. The team arranged to share Griffith Stadium with the Washington Senators, an American League baseball team. In their first game in D.C., the season opener, the Redskins defeated the New York Giants. The same season, they earned their first division title in Washington with a 49–14 win over the Giants. Shortly after, the team won their first championship by defeating the Chicago Bears in the 1937 NFL Championship Game.

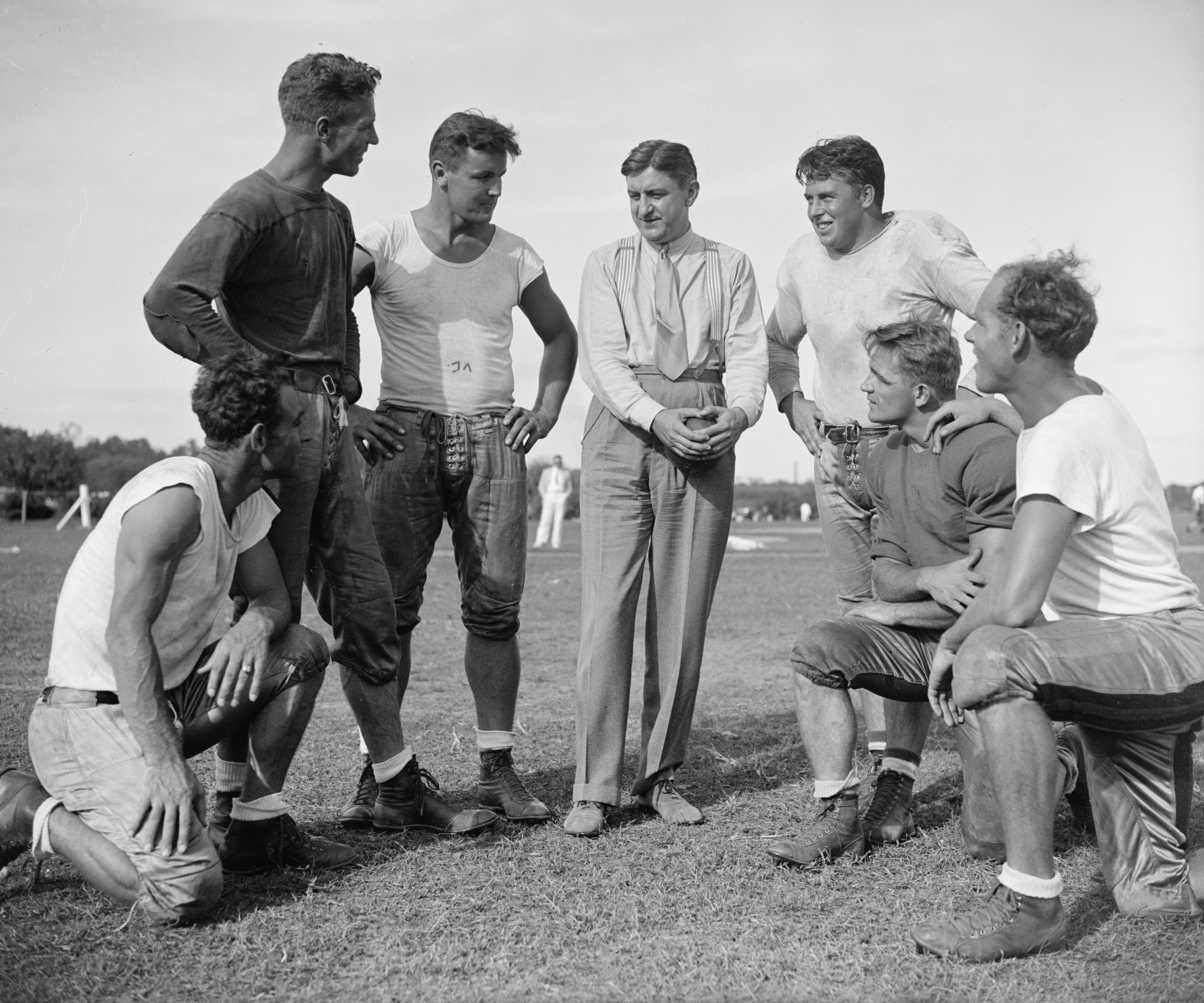
Marshall talking to players Wayne Millner, Charlie Malone, Vic Carroll, Bill Young, Ed Michaels, and Jim Garber in 1937, their first season in Washington, D.C.

The Redskins met the Bears again in the 1940 NFL Championship Game. The result, 73–0 in favor of the Bears, remains the worst one-sided loss in NFL history. The Redskins won their second championship in 1942, defeating the Bears 14–6. In 1943, Dutch Bergman was named head coach and led the team to a return to the NFL championship game, however they were defeated by the Chicago Bears 41–21. That same season, Sammy Baugh led the NFL in passing, punting, and interceptions.

The Redskins played in the NFL Championship one more time before a quarter-century drought that lasted until the 1972 season. With former Olympic gold medalist Dudley DeGroot as their new head coach, the Redskins went 8–2 during the 1945 season. One of the most impressive performances came from Baugh, who had a completion percentage of 70.3. They ended the season by losing to the Cleveland Rams in the 1945 NFL Championship Game, 15–14. The one-point margin of victory came under scrutiny because of a safety that occurred early in the game. In the first quarter, the Redskins had the ball at their own 5-yard line. Dropping back into the end zone, quarterback Baugh threw to an open receiver, but the ball hit the goal post and bounced back to the ground in the end zone. Under the rules at the time, this was ruled as a safety and thus gave the Rams a 2–0 lead. Marshall was so upset at the outcome that he became a major force in passing a major rule change after the season, in which a forward pass that struck the goalpost was automatically ruled incomplete. This later became known as the "Baugh/Marshall Rule".

The Redskins had four head coaches from 1946 to 1951, including former players Turk Edwards and Dick Todd, plus John Whelchel and Herman Ball. Meanwhile, Marshall sought to make the Redskins the most profitable franchise in the league. On June 14, 1950, the team announced that it would become the first NFL team to televise all of its games in a season, thanks to sponsorship by the American Oil Company. In February 1952, Marshall hired former Green Bay Packers coach Earl "Curly" Lambeau., but fired him two seasons later after the Redskins lost in their exhibition opener to the Los Angeles Rams. Marshall hired Joe Kuharich, who in 1955, led the Redskins to their first winning season in ten years and was named Sporting News Coach of the Year and UPI NFL Coach of the Year.

In 1961, the Redskins moved into D.C. Stadium, which would be renamed Robert F. Kennedy Memorial Stadium in 1969. The first game in the new stadium occurred on October 1 in front of 37,767 fans. The Redskins failed to hold a 14-point lead and lost to the New York Giants 24–21. That same year, Bill McPeak became the head coach and had a record of 21–46–3 over five seasons. During his tenure, he helped draft future stars: wide receiver Charley Taylor, tight end Jerry Smith, safety Paul Krause, center Len Hauss, and linebacker Chris Hanburger. He also helped pull off two important trades, gaining quarterback Sonny Jurgensen from the Philadelphia Eagles and linebacker Sam Huff from the New York Giants. In 1966, Otto Graham was hired as the new head coach. Graham coached the Redskins for three seasons for a record of 17–22–3. He resigned after the 1968 season, and the team hired former Green Bay Packers head coach Vince Lombardi for the same role.

==== Integration controversy ====
1961 American Nazi Party placard denouncing Marshall's integration of black players

During most of this unsuccessful period, Marshall continually refused to integrate the team, despite pressure from the U.S. government. Two months into the Kennedy administration on March 24, 1961, Secretary of the Interior Stewart Udall warned Marshall to hire black players or face federal retribution. For the first time in history, the federal government had attempted to desegregate a professional sports team. The Redskins were under the threat of civil rights legal action by the Kennedy administration, which would have prevented a segregated team from playing at the new federally-owned D.C. Stadium, managed by the U.S. Department of the Interior. The Redskins' previous venue, Griffith Stadium, was owned by the Griffith family, owners of the Washington Senators, who moved and became the Minnesota Twins in 1961.

In 1962, Washington became the final professional American football franchise to integrate. First, the Redskins selected running back Ernie Davis of Syracuse with the first overall pick in the 1962 NFL draft; Davis was the first black player to win the Heisman Trophy and the first to be the top selection in an NFL draft. Washington also took fullback Ron Hatcher of Michigan State in the eighth round, who became the first black player to sign a contract with the team.

In December 1961, Marshall announced he had traded the rights to Davis to the Cleveland Browns, who wanted Davis to join the league's leading rusher, Jim Brown, in their backfield. Davis was traded for veteran running back Bobby Mitchell, who became a wide receiver in Washington, D.C., and 1962 first-round draft choice Leroy Jackson of Western Illinois. The move was made under unfortunate circumstances – as it turned out that Davis had leukemia, and died without ever playing a down in professional football. The Redskins ended the 1962 season with their best record in five years: 5–7–2. Mitchell led the league with 11 touchdowns, and caught 72 passes and was selected to the Pro Bowl. In time, Mitchell would be joined by other black players like receiver Charley Taylor, running back Larry Brown, safety Brig Owens, and guard John Nisby.

=== Edward Bennett Williams era (1965–1979) ===
Marshall appointed board member Edward Bennett Williams to run the team's daily operations in 1965 due to declining health. He acquired controlling interest in the franchise following Marshall's death on August 9, 1969. In 1969, Williams hired former Green Bay Packers head coach Vince Lombardi for the same role, granting him a 5% stake in ownership and full control over football operations as the team's executive vice president. Lombardi coached the Redskins to a 7–5–2 record, their first winning season since 1955, but died from cancer shortly before the start of the 1970 season. Bill Austin, appointed earlier by Lombardi, served as interim head coach for the season.

==== George Allen years (1971–1977) ====
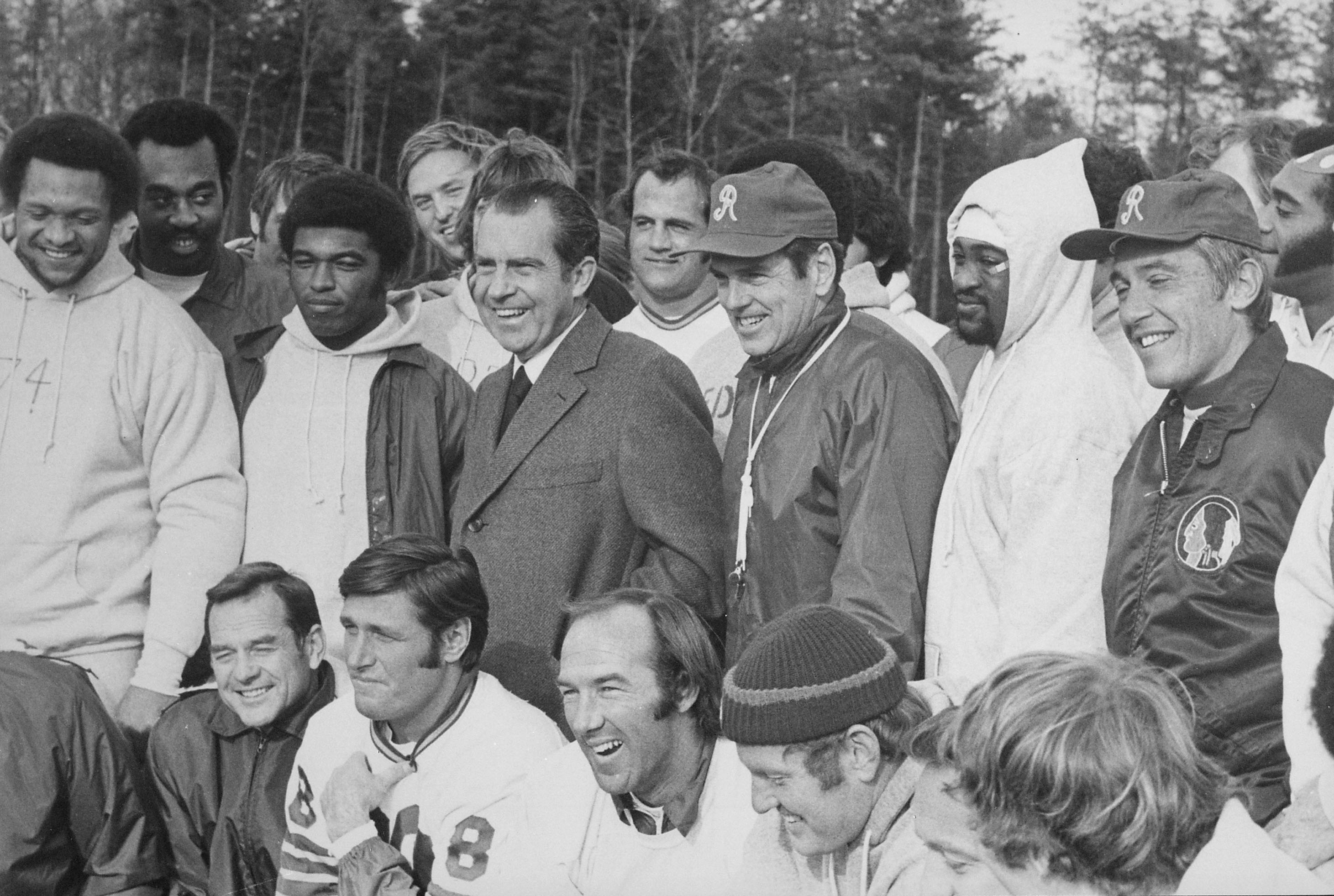
U.S. president Richard Nixon meeting with the team, 1971

On January 6, 1971, Williams hired former Los Angeles Rams head coach George Allen as head coach and general manager. Partial to seasoned veterans instead of highly touted young players, Allen's teams became known as the Over-the-Hill Gang. That season, the Redskins made the playoffs for the first time since 1945 with a 9–4–1 record with Redskins first-year head coach George Allen winning the 1971 NFL Coach of the Year award, the second of his career, having won his first in 1967 as head coach of the Los Angeles Rams. However, they lost in the Divisional Playoffs to the San Francisco 49ers, 24–20.

The following season, the Redskins hosted their first postseason game in Washington since 1942, where they beat the Green Bay Packers 16–3 in the NFC Divisional Playoffs. The Redskins reached the NFC Championship Game against Dallas Cowboys, the Redskins kicker Curt Knight kicked an 18-yard field goal in the second quarter to get the scoring underway, after which Redskins quarterback Billy Kilmer connected with wide receiver Charley Taylor on a 15-yard touchdown pass giving Washington a 10–3 lead at halftime. In the fourth quarter, Kilmer again went to Taylor, this time for a 45-yard touchdown. Knight added three more field goals during that period and so-called "The Over-The-Hill-Gang" defense allowed only a second quarter field goal. The final score was Washington 26, Dallas 3. After winning the NFC Championship, the Redskins went on to lose to the undefeated Miami Dolphins 14–7 in Super Bowl VII. Redskins running back Larry Brown was named the 1972 NFL MVP. The Redskins again made the playoffs in 1973, 1974, and 1976, only to lose all three times in the first round. After the team failed to make the playoffs in Redskins despite a 9–5 record, Allen was fired and was replaced at head coach by Jack Pardee.

=== Jack Kent Cooke era (1979–1998) ===
Canadian-American businessman Jack Kent Cooke, who had owned minority shares of the Redskins and been a board member since 1960, purchased majority interest from Edward Bennett Williams in 1974. Due to NFL rules at the time disallowing controlling ownership in other leagues, he allowed Williams to operate the team until selling his other properties, the NBA's Los Angeles Lakers and the NHL's Los Angeles Kings, to Jerry Buss in May 1979. Cooke became the team's sole owner in 1985 after purchasing the remaining shares from Williams for around $9 million.

==== Joe Gibbs years (1981–1992) ====
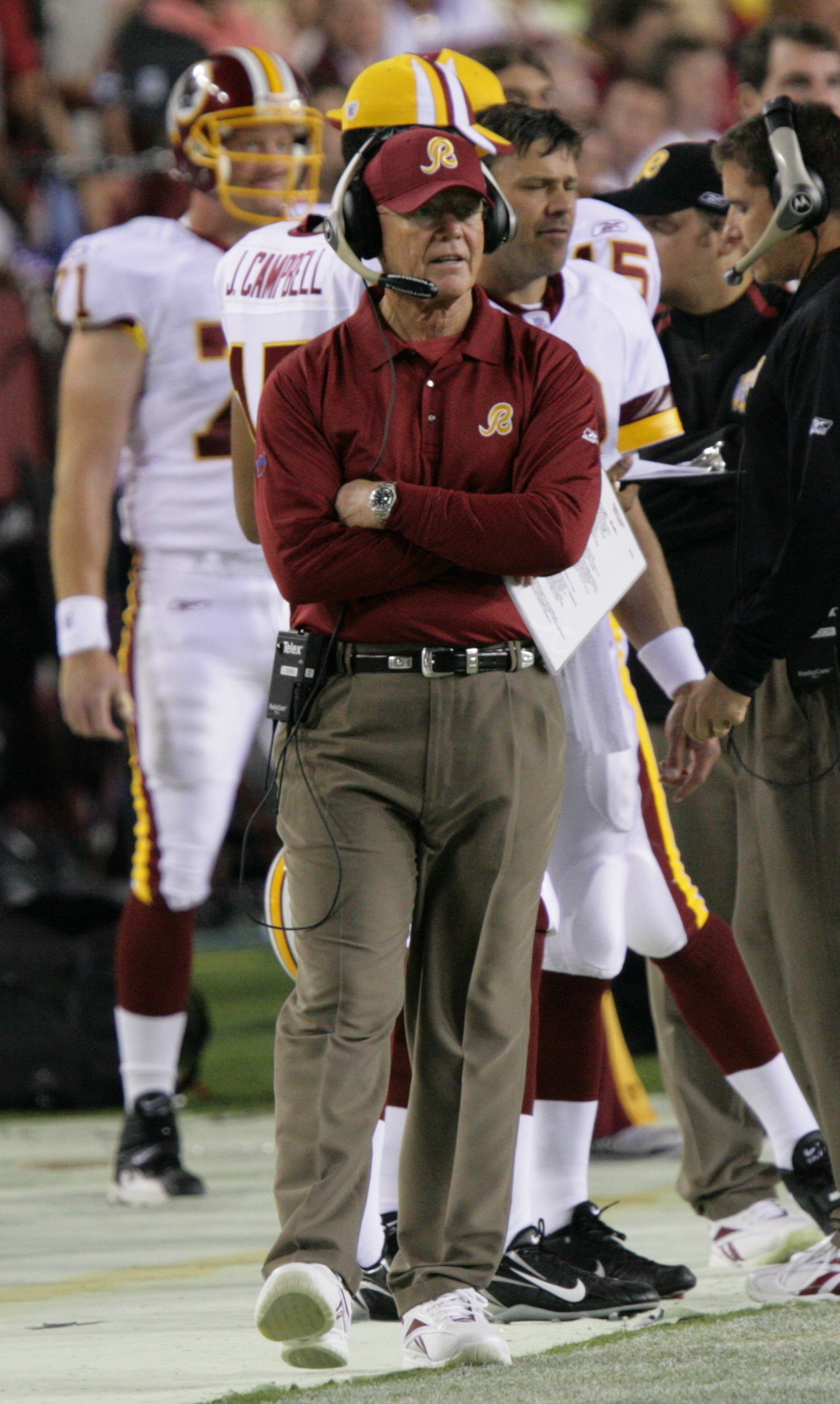
Head coach Joe Gibbs won Super Bowls in 1982, 1987, and 1991. He was inducted into the Pro Football Hall of Fame in 1996.

Jack Pardee, the 1979 NFL Coach of the Year, was fired following a 6–10 record in 1980. On January 13, 1981, Cooke hired San Diego Chargers offensive coordinator Joe Gibbs as head coach. During the offseason, the Redskins acquired players such as Mark May, Russ Grimm, and Dexter Manley in the 1981 NFL draft. After starting the 1981 season 0–5, the Redskins won eight out of their next 11 games and finished the season 8–8 but fourth in the NFC East.

===== Super Bowl XVII champions (1982) =====
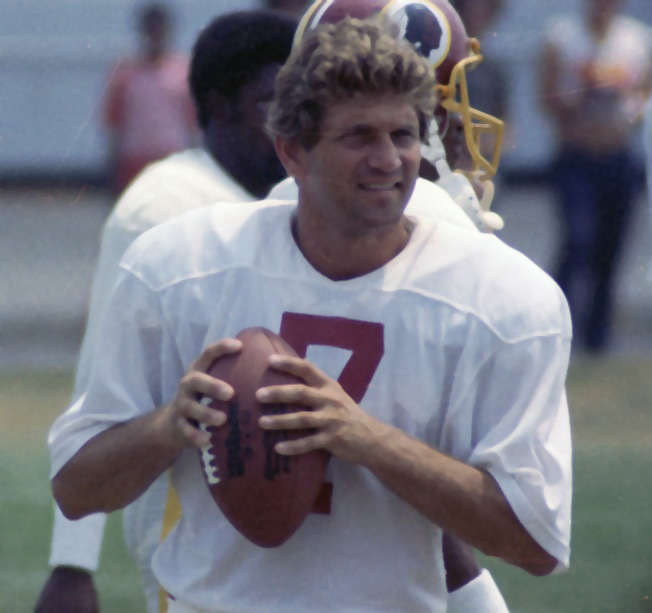
Quarterback Joe Theismann won the 1983 NFL MVP award

Starting on September 21, 1982, the NFL faced a 57-day long players' strike, which reduced the 1982 season from a 16-game schedule to nine. Because of the shortened season, the NFL adopted a special 16-team playoff tournament in which eight teams from each conference were seeded 1–8 based on their regular season records. After the strike was settled, the Redskins dominated, winning six out of the seven remaining games to make the playoffs for the first time since 1976.

In January 1983, during the second round of the playoffs against the Minnesota Vikings, John Riggins rushed for franchise playoff record 185 yards, leading Washington to a 21–7 win. The game is perhaps best known for a moment when the stadium physically shook as a crowd chanted "We Want Dallas!", which later became a rallying cry of sorts for Redskin fans before games against the Cowboys. In the NFC Championship Game against them at Robert F. Kennedy Memorial Stadium, Redskins defensive end Dexter Manley knocked Cowboys' quarterback Danny White out for the rest of the game and sent him into the locker room shortly before halftime. Later in the game, Redskins defensive tackle Darryl Grant intercepted a tipped pass that he returned for a 10-yard touchdown off of Cowboys' backup quarterback Gary Hogeboom. John Riggins rushed for 140 yards and two touchdowns on 36 carries and the Redskins went on to defeat the Cowboys' by a score of 31–17. The Redskins' first Super Bowl win and their first NFL Championship in 40 years was in Super Bowl XVII, where the Redskins defeated the Miami Dolphins 27–17. Riggins provided the game's signature play on 4th and inches with the Redskins down 17–13 when the coaches called "70 Chip", a play designed for short yardage. Riggins instead gained 43 yards (39 meters) by running through would-be tackler Don McNeal and getting the go-ahead touchdown. The Redskins ended up winning by a 27–17 score with John Riggins winning the Super Bowl MVP.

After the 1982 season Redskins kicker Mark Moseley was the first and only kicker in NFL history to be named the NFL's Most Valuable Player; Moseley made 20 of 21 field goals attempted in 1982. Redskins head coach Joe Gibbs also won his first NFL Coach of the Year award in 1982, which was the first of his back-to-back NFL Coach of the Year awards, his second coming in the 1983 NFL season.

Cornerback Darrell Green and defensive end Charles Mann were selected in the 1983 NFL draft and became key contributors for the team; Green would play his entire 20-year career with the Redskins. On October 1, 1983, the Redskins lost to the Green Bay Packers 48–47 in the highest-scoring Monday night football game in history, in which both teams combined for more than 1,000 yards (910 m) of total offense. Then during the regular season finale on December 17, 1983, Moseley set an NFL scoring record with 161 points while Riggins' total of 144 points was second. This marked the first time since 1951 that the top two scorers in a season played on the same team. They dominated the NFL with a 14-win season which included scoring a then NFL record 541 points, many of which came from Riggins, who scored 24 touchdowns. Redskins quarterback Joe Theismann would also be named the 1983 NFL's Most Valuable Player, finishing the season with 3,714 yards passing and 29 touchdown passes while throwing only 11 interceptions. In the postseason, the Redskins beat the Los Angeles Rams 51–7. The next week, Washington beat the San Francisco 49ers 24–21 in the NFC Championship Game. It was their final win of the season because two weeks later, the Raiders beat the Redskins 38–9 in Super Bowl XVIII.

The Redskins finished the 1984 season with an 11–5 record and won the NFC East for the third consecutive season. However, they lost in the first round of the playoffs to the Chicago Bears, 23–19. On November 18, 1985, while playing against the Giants, Theismann broke his leg during a sack by Lawrence Taylor. The compound fracture forced him to retire after a 12-year career, during which he had become the Redskins' all-time leader in pass attempts and completions. The Redskins finished 3rd in the NFC East behind the Cowboys and missed the wild card to the Giants by virtue of tiebreakers.

The 1986 offseason's major highlight occurred during the 1986 NFL draft when the Redskins picked up future Super Bowl MVP Mark Rypien in the sixth round. The Redskins defensive end Dexter Manley also set a franchise record when he got 18.5 sacks while earning All-Pro honors. In 1986 season, the Redskins made the postseason as a wild-card team despite having a regular season record of 12–4. They won the Wild Card playoff against the Rams and then against the Bears in the Divisional playoffs. This game was Gibbs's 70th career win, which made him the winningest head coach in Redskins history. The season ended the next week, however, when the Redskins lost to the eventual Super Bowl XXI Champion Giants 17–0 in the NFC Championship game.

===== Super Bowl XXII champions (1987) =====
The 1987 NFL season began with a players' strike that reduced the 16-game season to 15. No Redskins players crossed the picket line—the only such team—and the games for Weeks 4–6 were won with all-replacement squads. Those three victories, often credited with getting the team into the playoffs, are the basis for the 2000 movie The Replacements. The Redskins won their second championship in Super Bowl XXII on January 31, 1988, in San Diego, California. The Redskins routed the Denver Broncos 42–10 after starting the game down 10–0. This game is also noted for Super Bowl MVP quarterback Doug Williams, who threw four touchdowns in the second quarter en route to becoming the first black quarterback to start for his team to win a championship, and for rookie running back Timmy Smith, who ran for a Super Bowl–record 204 yards (187 m).

In 1988, the team missed the playoffs with a 7–9 record. The 1989 Redskins finished with a 10–6 record but missed the playoffs. The team is best remembered for "The Posse"—Art Monk, Gary Clark, and Ricky Sanders—the first trio of NFL wide receivers to post more than 1,000 yards apiece in a single season. Also, Redskins head coach Joe Gibbs achieved his 100th career victory in a week-14 win against the San Diego Chargers. The Redskins returned to the playoffs in 1990 as a Wild Card team, but lost in the Divisional round to the 49ers.

===== Super Bowl XXVI champions (1991) =====
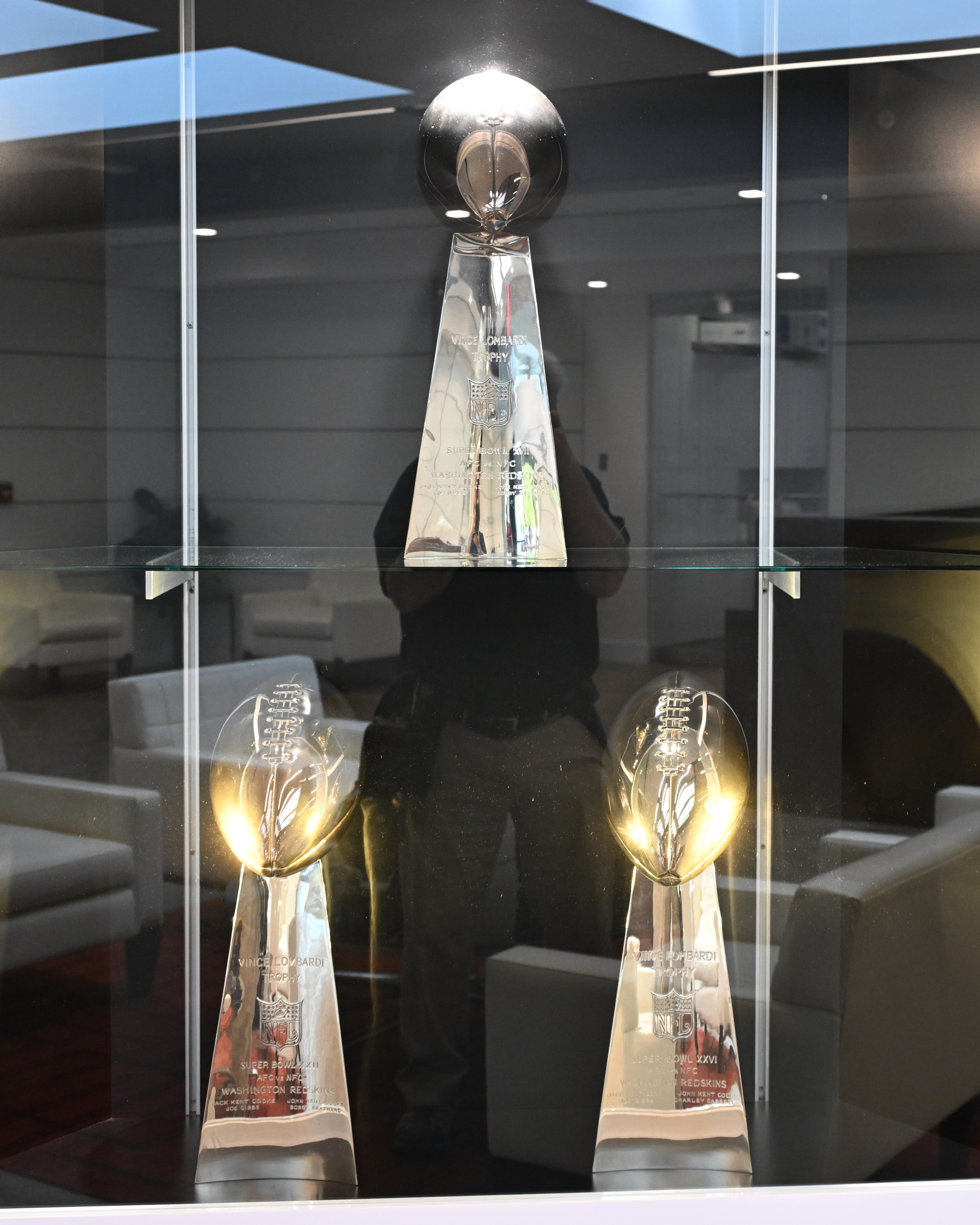
Washington's three Vince Lombardi Trophies at the team's Ashburn, Virginia, headquarters

The 1991 season started with a franchise-record 11 straight wins. "The Hogs", under the coaching of Redskins offensive line coach Joe Bugel, allowed a franchise-record nine sacks, the third-lowest total in NFL history. The offense also dominated under head football coach Joe Gibbs, scoring 485 points, more than any other team that year. The defense was also dominant under defensive coordinator Richie Petitbon, giving up 224 total points, second-best of any team that year, while holding opponents scoreless three times. After posting a 14–2 record, the Redskins dominated the playoffs, beating the Falcons and Lions by a combined score of 64–17. On January 26, 1992, the Redskins won Super Bowl XXVI by defeating the Buffalo Bills 37–24; QB Mark Rypien won the Super Bowl MVP award. After the Super Bowl, the Redskins set another franchise record by sending eight players to the Pro Bowl. The 1991 Washington Redskins are widely considered one of the best teams in NFL history.

In 1992, the Redskins reached the playoffs as a wild card team, but lost in the Divisional playoffs to the 49ers, 20–13. On October 12, 1992, Art Monk became the NFL's all-time leading pass receiver by catching his 820th career reception against the Denver Broncos on Monday Night Football. The era ended on March 5, 1993, when Gibbs retired after 12 years of coaching with the Redskins. Gibbs later founded Joe Gibbs Racing.

After the end of Gibbs' first tenure, the Redskins hired former Redskins player Richie Petitbon for the 1993 season. However, his first and only year as head coach, the Redskins finished with a record of 4–12. Petitbon was fired at the end of the season and on February 2, 1994, Norv Turner was hired as head coach after being the offensive coordinator of the Dallas Cowboys. 1994 was even worse as they finished 3–13, their worst season in over 30 years. Their sole bright spot that year came on October 9, 1994, linebacker Monte Coleman played in his 206th career game with the Redskins, which broke Art Monk's team record for games played (Coleman retired at season's end with 216 games played). They improved to 6–10 in 1995 where they were able to get a season sweep on the eventual Super Bowl XXX Champions the Dallas Cowboys. On March 13, 1996, Redskins owner Jack Kent Cooke, Maryland governor Parris Glendening, and Prince George's County Executive Wayne K. Curry signed a contract that paved the way for the immediate start of construction for the new home of the Redskins (now Northwest Stadium). The 1996 season saw Washington post their first winning record in 4 years by finishing 9–7. On December 22, 1996, the Redskins played their final game at RFK Stadium, a victory over the Dallas Cowboys 37–10, and finished their tenure at the stadium with a 173–102–3 record, including 11–1 in the playoffs.

On April 6, 1997, Redskins owner Jack Kent Cooke died of congestive heart failure at the age of 84. In his will, Cooke left the Redskins to the Jack Kent Cooke Foundation, with instructions to sell the team. In the meantime, management of the team was given to son and executive vice president John Kent Cooke. On September 14, 1997, the Redskins played in their new stadium for the first time and beat the Arizona Cardinals, 19–13 in overtime. On November 23, 1997, they played the New York Giants and the result was a 7–7 tie, the Redskins first tie game since the 1971 season. They would finish 1997 8–7–1 and would miss the playoffs for the fifth season in a row. Cornerback Darrell Green would break Monte Coleman's record for games played with the team during the season. The 1998 season started with a seven-game losing streak, and the Redskins finished with a 6–10 record.

=== Daniel Snyder era (1999–2023) ===
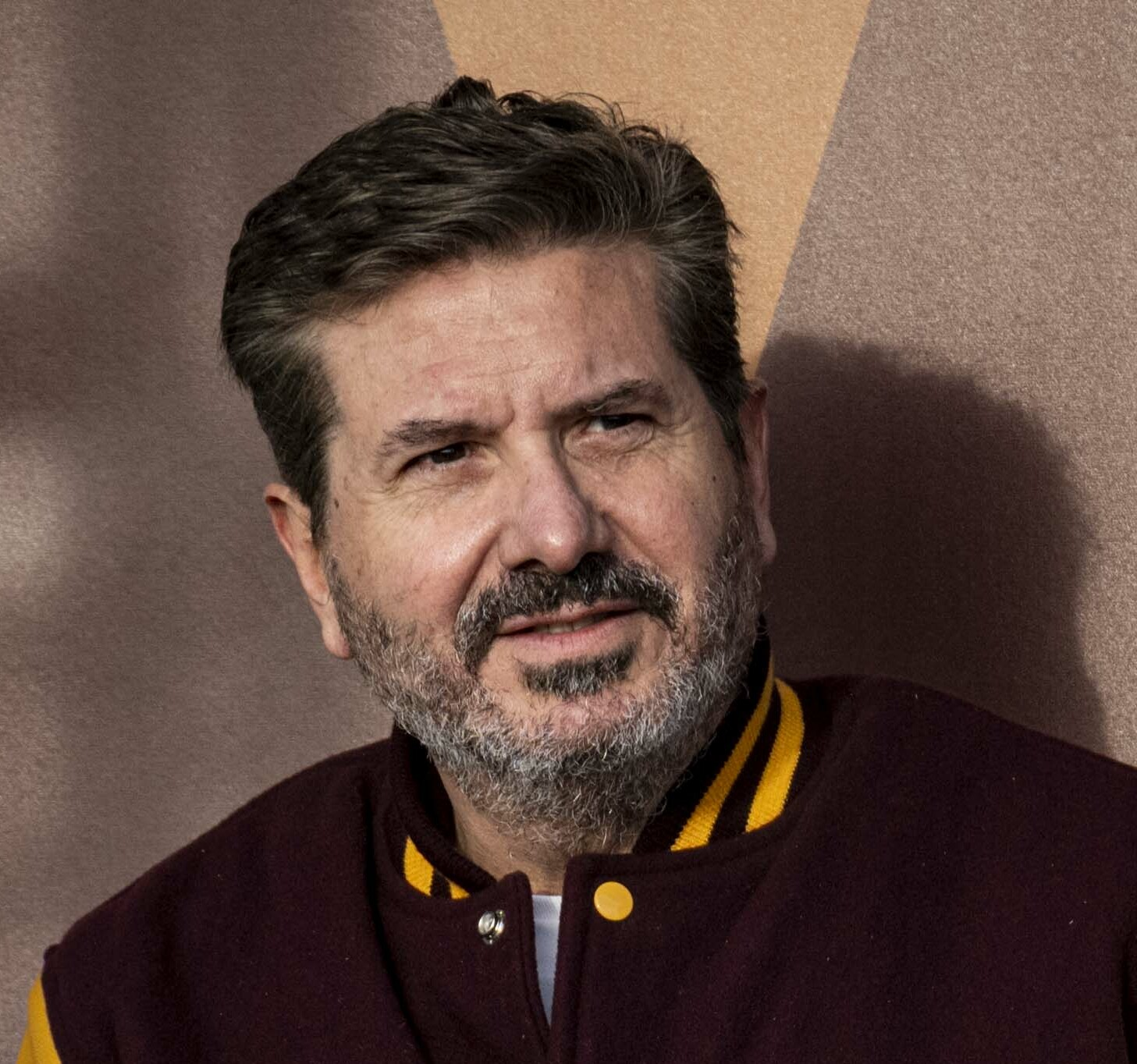
Daniel Snyder, the team's owner from 1999 until 2023

On May 25, 1999, Cooke sold the Redskins to local businessman Daniel Snyder for $800 million after being unable to raise sufficient funds to keep the team. Snyder sold the naming rights to Jack Kent Cooke Stadium to FedEx in November 1999, becoming FedExField.

In Snyder's first season as owner, the Redskins went 10–6, including a four-game winning streak early in the season, and made it to the playoffs for the first time in Norv Turner's career (and the first time for the Redskins since 1992) in the final game of the season (on January 2, 2000, against the Dolphins). Running back Stephen Davis rushed for a then franchise record 1,405 yards and quarterback Brad Johnson completed a then franchise record 316 passes and threw for more than 4,000 yards in regular play that season. They then defeated the Detroit Lions in the first round of the playoffs, but lost to the Buccaneers, 14–13.

In the 2000 NFL draft, the team picked future Pro Bowler Chris Samuels and the tumultuous LaVar Arrington. The first half of the 2000 season saw five consecutive wins, but subsequent losses led to Turner's firing mid-season; under interim head coach Terry Robiskie, the team finished 8–8. During the final game of the season, Larry Centers became the NFL's all-time leader in receptions by a fullback with 685.

On January 3, 2001, the Redskins hired former Cleveland Browns and Kansas City Chiefs head coach Marty Schottenheimer. The 2001 season began with a loss to the San Diego Chargers, 30–3, two days before the September 11 attacks. On September 13, the Redskins announced the establishment of the Redskins Relief Fund to help families of the victims of the attack at the Pentagon; it would raise more than $700,000 in the first season. The team finished 8–8 and Schottenheimer was fired after the final game. Snyder would say in a 2013 interview that Schottenheimer was fired for his controlling nature.

On January 14, 2002, Snyder hired Florida Gators coach Steve Spurrier, the Redskins' fifth head coach in 10 years. They finished with a 7–9 record, their first losing season in four years. A bittersweet moment during the season occurred on December 29, when Darrell Green concluded his 20th and final season as the Redskins defeated the Cowboys 20–14 at FedExField. During his 20 seasons, he set an NFL record for consecutive seasons with at least one interception (19) and a Redskins team record for regular-season games played (295) and started (258). The Redskins finished the 2003 season with a 5–11 record, their worst since 1994. After two mediocre years, Spurrier resigned after the 2003 season with three years left on his contract.

For the 2004 season, Snyder hired former coach Joe Gibbs to return as head coach and team president. Gibbs' return to the franchise did not pay instant dividends as the Redskins finished the 2004 season with a record of 6–10. Despite an impressive defense, the team struggled offensively. Quarterback Mark Brunell—an offseason addition from the Jacksonville Jaguars—struggled in his first season, and was replaced midway through the season by backup Patrick Ramsey. On the other hand, some of Gibbs' other new signings, such as cornerback Shawn Springs and linebacker Marcus Washington, did very well. The Redskins also selected Sean Taylor during the first draft in Gibbs' return.

The 2005 season started with three wins, including a win on September 19 against the Dallas Cowboys. Dallas led 13–0 with less than four minutes left when Brunell threw a 39-yard (36 m) touchdown pass to Moss on a fourth-down play. Then, with 2:44 left, Brunell connected with Moss again on a 70-yard (64 m) touchdown pass and Nick Novak kicked the game-winning extra point. It was the Redskins' first victory at Texas Stadium since 1995. They then fell into a slump, losing six of the next eight games which included three straight losses in November, and their playoff chances looked bleak. On December 18, 2005, the Redskins beat Cowboys, 35–7, which marked the first time since 1995 that the Redskins swept the season series with Dallas. The Redskins clinched their first playoff berth since 1999. The game also culminated impressive season performances by individuals. Portis set a team mark for most rushing yards in a single season with 1,516 yards (1,386 m), and Moss set a team record for most receiving yards in a single season with 1,483 yards (1,356 m), breaking Bobby Mitchell's previous record set in 1963. Also, Chris Cooley's 71 receptions broke Jerry Smith's season record for a Redskins tight end. In the first round of the playoffs, the Redskins met the Buccaneers. The Redskins won 17–10, after taking an early 14–0 lead, which they thought they lost until replay showed that a touchdown, which would have tied the game, was an incomplete pass. In that game, the Redskins broke the record for fewest offensive yards (120) gained in a playoff victory, with one of their two touchdowns being from a defensive run after a fumble recovery. The following weekend, they played the Seahawks, who defeated the Redskins 20–10, ending their hopes of reaching their first NFC Championship Game since 1991.

The first major move of the 2006 off-season was the hiring of Kansas City Chiefs' offensive coordinator Al Saunders as offensive coordinator. Gibbs also added former Buffalo Bills defensive coordinator Jerry Gray to his staff as secondary/cornerbacks coach and lost quarterbacks coach Bill Musgrave to the Falcons. The Redskins also picked up future starters Rocky McIntosh, Anthony Montgomery, Reed Doughty, and Kedric Golston in the 2006 NFL draft. After winning only three of the first nine games, Gibbs benched quarterback Brunell for former first-round draft pick Jason Campbell. After losing his first game as a starter to Tampa Bay, Campbell got his first NFL victory against the Carolina Panthers, bringing the Redskins out of a three-game losing streak. The highlight of the season happened on November 5, and concluded with one of the most exciting endings in the history of the Cowboys–Redskins rivalry. Tied 19–19, Troy Vincent blocked a field goal by that would have given them the win. Sean Taylor picked up the ball and ran 30 yards (27 m), breaking tackles along the way. It was thought that the game would then go in overtime, however because of a defensive 15-yard (14 m) face mask penalty, the Redskins would get an untimed down. Novak kicked a 47-yard (43 m) field goal, giving Washington a 22–19 victory. However, the Redskins finished the year with a 5–11 record, which resulted in them being last in the NFC East. This marked the second losing season of Joe Gibbs' second term as head coach with the Redskins, compared to the one losing season he had in his first 12-year tenure as head coach.

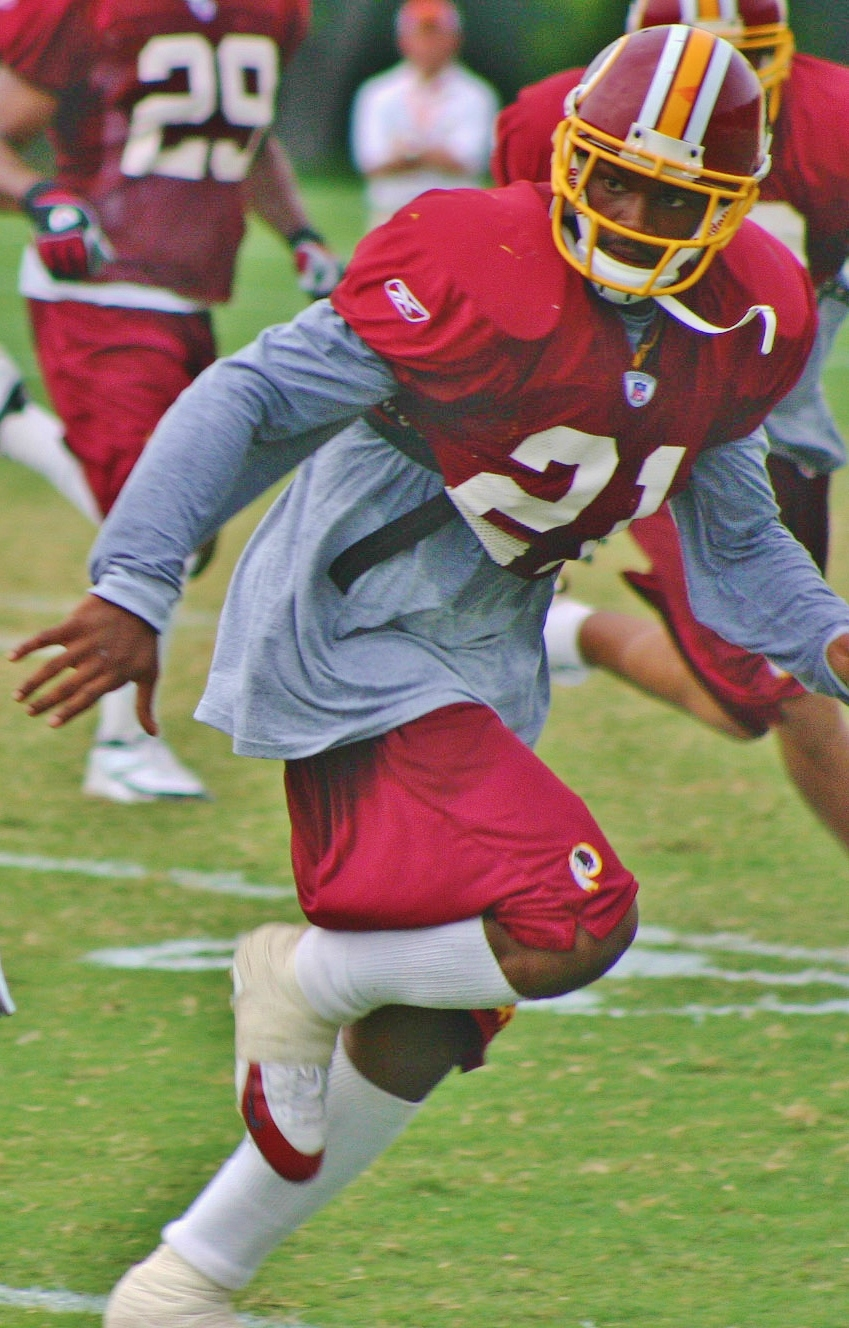
Sean Taylor, the team's first-round draft choice in 2004, died after being shot by home invaders in 2007. His jersey number 21 was later retired by the team.

The Redskins began the 2007 season by "winning ugly" starting the season off 2–0. The Redskins kept winning and losing close games, the only exception to this a 34–3 rout of the Detroit Lions. The Redskins continued to win ugly and lose ugly to be 5–3 at the halfway mark. However, the Redskins would begin to collapse. The team lost their next three games to fall to 5–6. On Monday, November 26, Redskins safety Sean Taylor was shot by home intruders early in the morning in his Miami home. The next morning, Taylor died from severe blood loss. However, the Redskins rebounded to finish 9–7 and clinch the final playoff spot in the NFC. Washington trailed 13–0 entering the 4th quarter to the Seattle Seahawks in the wild card round, but rallied to take a 14–13 lead, but Redskins kicker Shaun Suisham missed a field goal later in the game, and the Seahawks scored on the next drive and converted the two-point conversion. To close the game, Todd Collins threw two interceptions, each returned for a touchdown, and the Redskins fell 35–14.

After Joe Gibbs announced his retirement following the 2007 season, Jim Zorn was hired as head coach and brought in a West Coast Offense. The 2008 season started well, as the Redskins started the season 6–2. Furthermore, Redskins RB Clinton Portis led the NFL in rushing yards. However, things turned for the worse in early November, when they were routed 23–6 by the Pittsburgh Steelers and Portis' injuries finally caught up to him. The Redskins continued to struggle, falling all the way to 7–7, with their only win during that six-week period being a 3-point victory of the then-2–8 Seattle Seahawks. The Redskins managed to upset the Philadelphia Eagles in Week 16, but were eliminated from playoff contention. The team's fortunes continued to slide in 2009, as they finished 4–12. Zorn was fired and replaced by Mike Shanahan after the season.

On April 4, the Redskins acquired quarterback Donovan McNabb in a trade from the rival Philadelphia Eagles. However, the Redskins struggled to a 6–10 finish, once again 4th place in the division. The McNabb era came to an abrupt end when he was traded to Minnesota in August 2011. After cutting the injury-prone Clinton Portis, the Redskins had no important offensive players left except for Santana Moss. Mike Shanahan surprised most observers by his decision to name John Beck, an obscure free agent quarterback, as the starter. However, Shanahan suddenly reversed direction by naming veteran backup Rex Grossman to the starting position. In Week 1, Grossman threw for 305 yards and two touchdown passes as the Redskins crushed the Giants 28–14, ending a six-game losing streak against that team. The Washington Redskins started the season 2–0, but then struggled to a 5–11 finish, however, they managed to win both meetings over the eventual Super Bowl champion New York Giants.

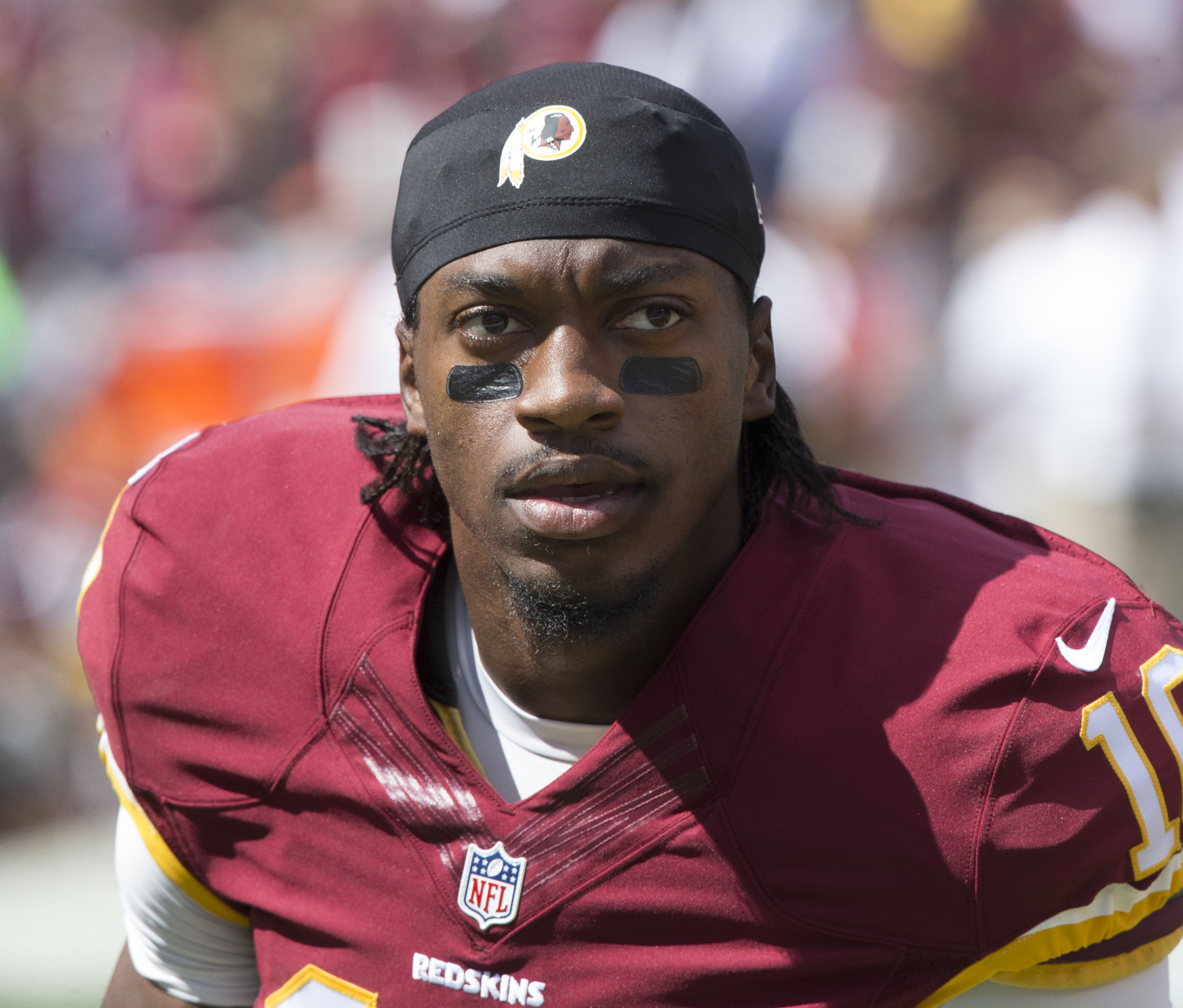
Quarterback Robert Griffin III, the team's first-round draft choice in 2012, was named Offensive Rookie of the Year after leading the team to their first division title since 1999.

In 2012, the Redskins traded several high draft picks to the St. Louis Rams in order to take Baylor quarterback Robert Griffin III second overall in the 2012 NFL draft. Although the need for a franchise quarterback was obvious, many journalists had doubts about the value of giving up a lot for a single player. In the opening game of the season, Griffin threw for 320 yards and two touchdown passes in a 40–32 victory over the New Orleans Saints to give the team its highest-scoring game since 2005. The Redskins struggled to a 3–6 start, but in Week 11, the Redskins would host the struggling Philadelphia Eagles. Griffin would have one of the best games of his career to date, as the Redskins won 31–6 with long touchdowns to Santana Moss and Aldrick Robinson. The Redskins would win their next 6 games after that, including the crucial final game of the season against the Cowboys, which would clinch the division for and send the Redskins to the playoffs. The Redskins hosted the Seattle Seahawks in the Wild Card round but lost 24–14.

Hopes were high for a repeat division title in 2013. However, these hopes were in vain, as poor play and controversy stirred during the entire year, leading to a 3–13 record. Even though most players had a down year compared to 2012, Pierre Garçon had his greatest season statistically yet. Garcon broke Art Monk's 29-year-old franchise record for catches in a single season. Garcon had 113 catches total, which broke Monk's 106 catches in 1984 by seven. The Redskins fired Shanahan and most of his staff after the season.

On January 9, 2014, the Redskins hired Jay Gruden as their head coach. Gruden became the eighth head coach of the team since Daniel Snyder purchased the franchise in 1999. The Redskins struggled throughout the season, having three different quarterbacks start games, amounting to a 4–12 record. Defensive coordinator Jim Haslett was fired at the end of the season.

In 2015, the Redskins hired Scot McCloughan to be their general manager, with Bruce Allen serving as team president. In October 2015, the Redskins had their largest comeback win in franchise history, coming back to win against the Tampa Bay Buccaneers 31–30 after being down 0–24 in the second quarter. The Redskins clinched the NFC East division title on December 26, when they beat the Philadelphia Eagles in Week 16, 38–24. The division title was their third since Snyder took over ownership of the team, and was the first since the 1999 season to be clinched before Week 17. The Redskins hosted the Green Bay Packers in the Wild Card round on January 10, 2016, but lost 35–18, ending their 2015 season. Kirk Cousins, who took over as starting quarterback in the preseason, finished the season with career highs in touchdowns (29), yards (4,166), and completion percentage (69.8%). His completion percentage led the league, while his 29 touchdowns tied him for second on the franchise single-season list.

The team's offense in 2016 set several franchise records, including having over 6,000 total net yards, which was only the third time in franchise history the team had accomplished that. Quarterback Kirk Cousins also set single-season team records in attempts, completions, and passing yards, breaking many of his records he had previously set in 2015. DeSean Jackson, Pierre Garçon, Jamison Crowder, Robert Kelley, Chris Thompson, Jordan Reed, Vernon Davis, and Matt Jones all finished the season with at least 500 yards from scrimmage, tying the 2011 New Orleans Saints for the most in a single season in NFL history. Despite the numerous records set, the Redskins missed the playoffs, losing 19–10 in a "win and in" situation against the New York Giants in the final week of the season. However, the Redskins still finished the season with a record of 8–7–1, giving the team their first consecutive winning seasons in nearly 20 years. In contrast with the record setting offense, the team's defense had a poor season, finishing 29 out of 32 teams in total defense, which led to the firing of defensive coordinator Joe Barry, as well as three of his assistants. In 2017, Cousins had his third straight season with 4,000 passing yards while once again playing under the franchise tag. For the second straight season, the Redskins missed the playoffs, finishing 7–9.

During the 2018 offseason, the Redskins traded for quarterback Alex Smith to replace Kirk Cousins as he left for the Minnesota Vikings in free agency. Despite early success starting the season 6–3, their best start since 2008, the team finished the season 1–6 due to injuries. In a game against the Houston Texans on November 18, 2018, Smith suffered a compound and spiral fracture to his tibia and fibula in his right leg when he was sacked by Kareem Jackson and J. J. Watt which forced him to miss the rest of the season. This led to Colt McCoy, Mark Sanchez, and Josh Johnson starting games in the second half of the season. The team finished at 7–9 and missed the playoffs for the third consecutive year, with 25 players on injured reserve.

Due to Smith's injury, the Redskins signed Case Keenum from the Denver Broncos in the 2019 offseason, and drafted Dwayne Haskins from Ohio State in the 2019 NFL draft. With a league worst 0–5 start to the season, tying with the Cincinnati Bengals, and their worst start since 2001, the Redskins fired Gruden on October 7, 2019, with offensive line coach Bill Callahan serving as the interim head coach for the rest of the season. Gruden finished as the longest-tenured head coach in the Snyder era with six seasons, a 35–49–1 regular season record and one playoff appearance. The Redskins finished the season at 3–13, with victories over the Detroit Lions and Carolina Panthers, and missed the playoffs for the fourth straight year. The record matched their worst since 2013 and was the second worst of any team that season.

==== Rebranding and workplace culture investigations (2020–2023) ====
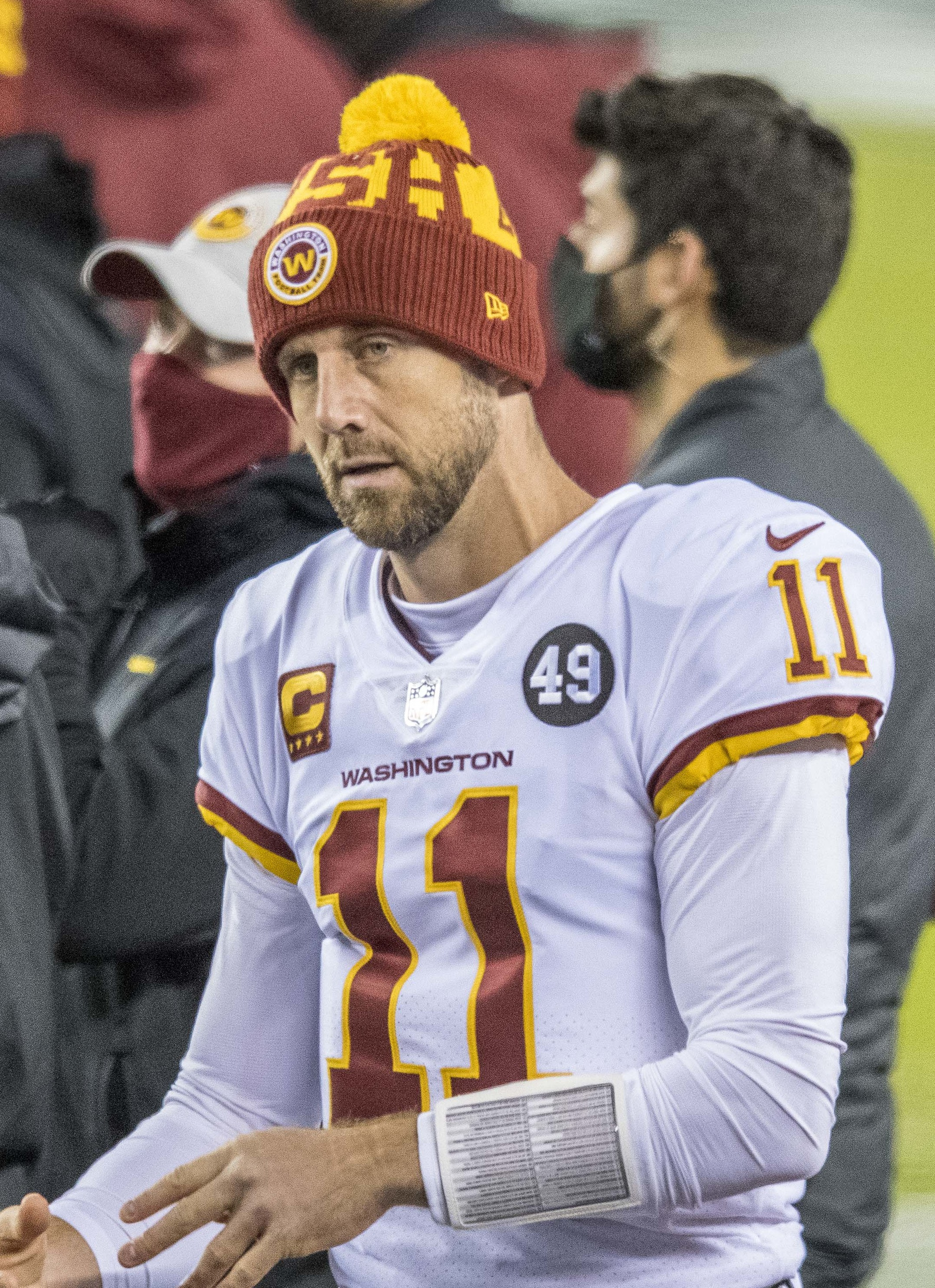
After recovering from a leg fracture sustained in 2018 and subsequent life-threatening infections, quarterback Alex Smith helped lead the team to a NFC East division title in 2020 and earned the NFL Comeback Player of the Year award.

The team underwent several changes in 2020, including retiring the Redskins name and logo and hiring former Carolina Panthers head coach Ron Rivera in the same role, as well as naming Jason Wright as team president, the first black person named to that position in NFL history. Some notable members of Rivera's staff include former Jacksonville Jaguars and Oakland Raiders head coach Jack Del Rio as defensive coordinator and Scott Turner, the son of former Redskins head coach Norv Turner, as offensive coordinator.

Under Rivera and Del Rio, the team switched their defensive scheme from a 3–4 defense, which the team had used under both Shanahan and Gruden's tenure, to a 4–3 defense. Due to their 3–13 record the previous season, the team held the second overall pick in the 2020 NFL draft and selected Chase Young, who went on to be named Defensive Rookie of the Year. Dwayne Haskins, the team's first-round draft pick from 2019, was released mid-season for ineffective play and not meeting the team's off-the-field standards. Washington won the division for the first time since 2015, going 7–9 and becoming only the third team in NFL history to win a division with a losing record in a non-strike year after the 2010 Seattle Seahawks and the Rivera-coached 2014 Carolina Panthers.

In July 2021, lawyer Beth Wilkinson concluded a year-long independent investigation into the team's workplace culture under owner Daniel Snyder. It found that sexual harassment, bullying, and intimidation were common throughout the organization. The NFL fined the team $10 million in response, and Snyder stepped down from running the team's day-to-day operations, giving those responsibilities to his wife and team CEO Tanya. A U.S. House Oversight Committee report later corroborated the claims and accused him of withholding security deposits from season ticket holders.

The 2021 season saw the hiring of Martin Mayhew as general manager and Marty Hurney as another high-ranking executive. With the hiring of Mayhew, Washington became the first NFL team to concurrently have a minority general manager, head coach, and president. Quarterback Ryan Fitzpatrick was injured in the opening game, and backup quarterback Taylor Heinicke started for most of the season. The team missed the playoffs with a 7–10 record.

The Football Team rebranded as the Commanders in 2022 with new logos and uniforms. The team traded for Colts quarterback Carson Wentz in the offseason, but benched him for Heinicke. Neither were retained after the season. The team finished 8–8–1, the first team since 2008 to finish last in the division with a non-losing record. The season was the last under Snyder's ownership.

=== Josh Harris era (2023–present) ===
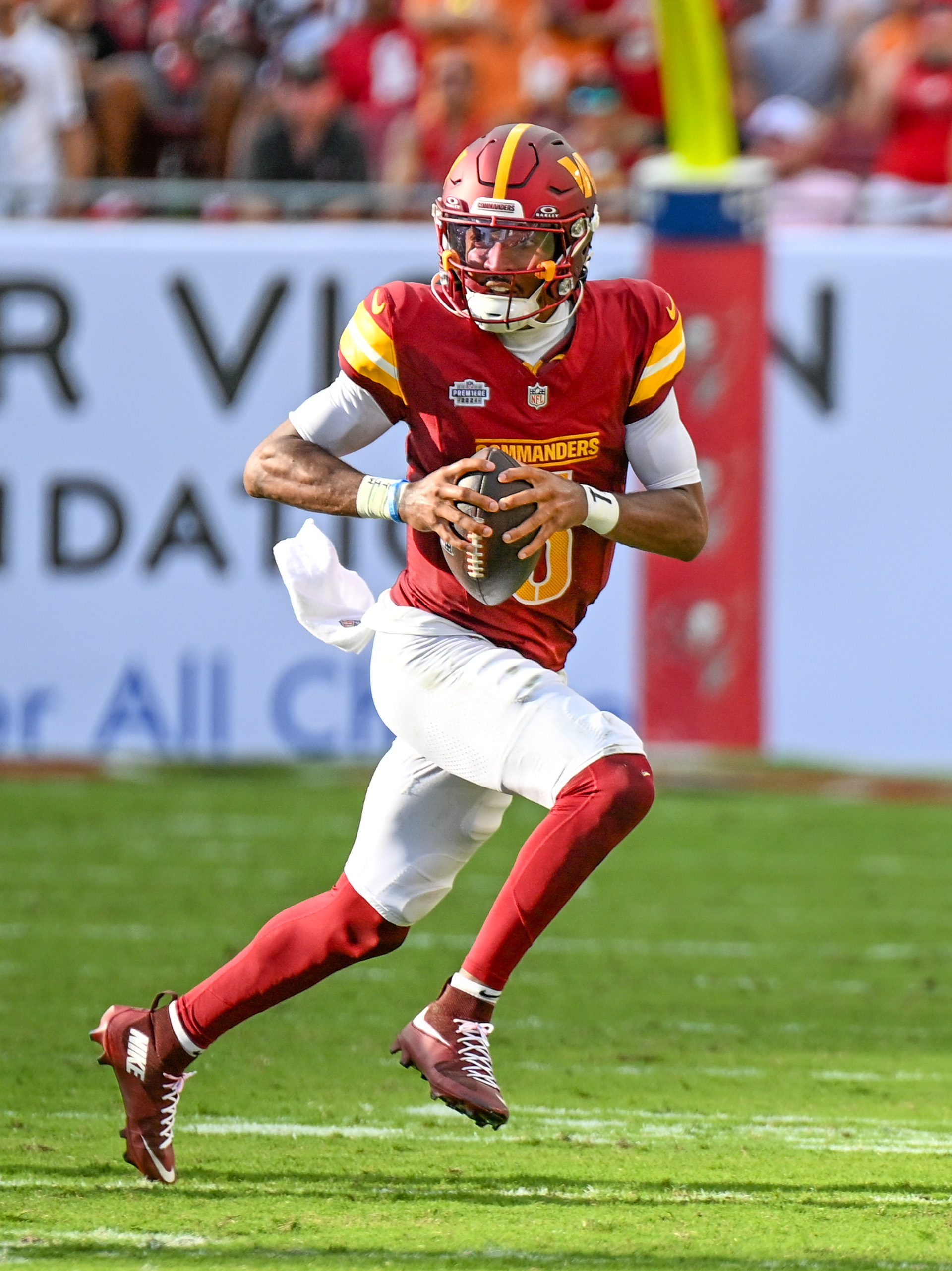
Quarterback Jayden Daniels, selected second overall in the 2024 draft, was the Offensive Rookie of the Year after setting several team and NFL rookie records.

In November 2022, Snyder hired BofA Securities after mounting pressure from other NFL owners to sell the team to explore possible transactions. In May 2023, he reached an agreement to sell the franchise to a group headed by Josh Harris, co-founder of Apollo Global Management and owner of the NBA's Philadelphia 76ers and NHL's New Jersey Devils, for $6.05 billion. Key limited partners include Danaher and Glenstone founder Mitchell Rales, Hall of Fame basketball player Magic Johnson, and venture capitalist Mark Ein. The sale, the highest price ever paid for a sports team at the time, was approved by the NFL on July 20, 2023. By 2024, the team had invested $75 million in improving the infrastructure and game experience of Northwest Stadium, including improved food options and renovations to the sound system and suites.

The Commanders finished the 2023 season with a 4–13 record, allowing the most points and having the worst point differential in the league. Second-year quarterback Sam Howell, who started all 17 games, also led the league in sacks allowed (65) and interceptions thrown (21). It was their seventh straight non-winning season and third straight being eliminated from the playoffs, with the team also going winless in the division for the first time since 2019. Head coach Ron Rivera and his staff were fired following the season's conclusion. The 2024 season saw the hiring of Adam Peters as general manager and former Falcons coach Dan Quinn as head coach. The front office and roster saw several changes under Peters, including signing around 30 free agents and selecting 2023 Heisman quarterback Jayden Daniels second overall in the 2024 NFL draft. Led by Daniels, the 2024 Offensive Rookie of the Year, the Commanders went 12–5, won a playoff game for the first time since 2005, and made the NFC Championship Game for the first time since 1991.

In April 2025, the Commanders and the D.C. government announced a $3.8 billion New Stadium at RFK Campus to be replace the former RFK Stadium at a targeted opening of 2030.

== Logos and uniforms ==
Redskins wordmark from 1972 to 2019

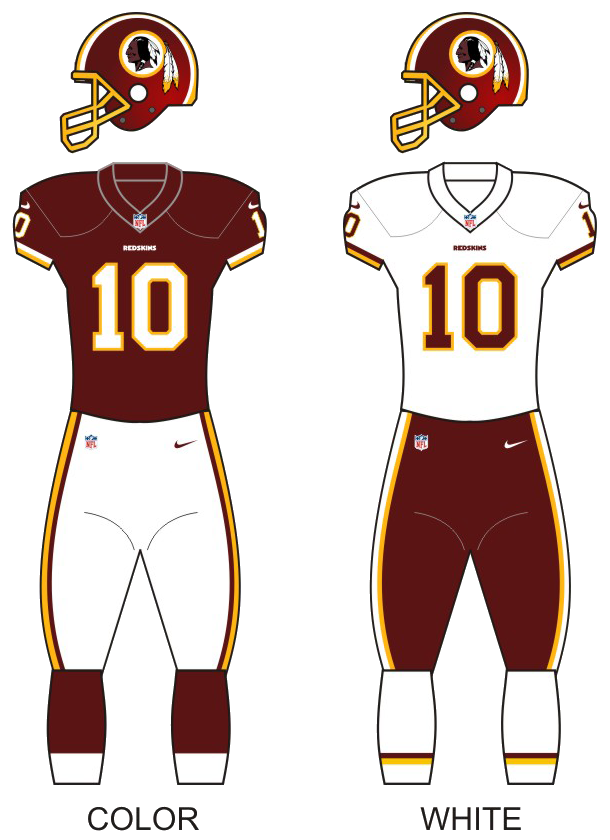
The uniform style most commonly worn by the team from the 1980s to the early 2010s

The franchise's primary colors are burgundy and gold. From 1961 through 1978, Washington wore gold pants with both the burgundy and white jerseys, although details of the jerseys and pants changed a few times during this period. Gold face masks were introduced in 1978 and remain as such to this day; previous to that they were grey. Throughout most of the 1980s, 1990s, and 2000s, Washington was just one of three other teams that primarily wore their white jerseys at home (the others being the Dallas Cowboys and Miami Dolphins). The tradition of wearing white jerseys over burgundy pants at home, which is considered the "classic" look, was started by Joe Gibbs when he took over as coach in 1981. Gibbs was an assistant for the San Diego Chargers in 1979 and 1980 when the team wore white at home under head coach Don Coryell. Prior to Gibbs's arrival, the only season in which the Redskins wore white at home was 1964.

Their burgundy jerseys were primarily used only when the opposing team decided to wear white at home, which came mostly against the Dallas Cowboys and was normally worn over white pants. It was worn on the road against other teams that prefer to wear white at home for games occurring early in the season. From 1981 through 2000, Washington wore their white jerseys over burgundy pants at home almost exclusively. In 1994, as part of a league-wide celebration of the NFL's 75th anniversary, during certain games, the team wore special uniforms which emulated the uniforms worn by the team in its inaugural season in Washington in 1937. Both worn over gold pants, the burgundy jerseys featured gold numbers bordered in white and the white jerseys featured burgundy numbers bordered in gold. The most distinctive feature of both colors of the jersey was the patches worn on both sleeves, which were a reproduction of the patches worn on the full-length sleeves of the 1937 jerseys. Worn with these uniforms was a plain burgundy helmet with a gold facemask.

In 2001, the team wore burgundy for all home games in the preseason and regular season per a decision by Marty Schottenheimer, their coach for that year. In 2002, the team celebrated the passing of 70 years since its creation as the Boston Braves in 1932 and wore a special home uniform, a burgundy jersey over gold pants, which roughly resembled the home uniforms used from 1969 to 1978. The helmets used with this special home uniform during that year were a reproduction of the helmets used by the team from 1965 to 1969, though they wore white at home in Week 1 against the Arizona Cardinals and again in Week 17, the latter forcing the Cowboys to use their blue jerseys. This special home uniform was also worn during one game in 2003 vs.the Saints. In 2004, when Gibbs became the coach of the team once again, the team switched back to wearing white jerseys at home; in Gibbs's 16 years as head coach, the team never wore burgundy jerseys at home.

Their white jerseys have provided three basic color combinations. The last combination consists of both white jerseys and pants. That particular combination surfaced in the first game of the 2003 season when the team was coached by Steve Spurrier, during a nationally televised game against the New York Jets, which led many sports fans and Redskins faithful alike to point out that they had never seen that particular combination before. The Redskins won six straight games, including one in the playoffs against the Tampa Bay Buccaneers, wearing that combination. In the NFC Divisional Playoff game against the eventual 2005 NFC Champion Seattle Seahawks, Washington wore the all-white uniforms in hopes that they could keep their streak going; however, they lost 20–10. The white jersey over burgundy pants look reappeared in a home game against the Carolina Panthers later in 2006.

In celebration of the franchise's 75th anniversary, Washington wore a one-time throwback uniform for a home game against the New York Giants, based on their away uniform from 1970 to 1971. Players wore a white jersey with three burgundy and two gold stripes on each sleeve and the 75th-anniversary logo on the left chest. The pants were gold, with one white stripe bordered by a burgundy stripe on each side, running down each side. The helmet was gold-colored with a burgundy "R" logo (the R was in the Windsor typeface). The helmet and uniform styles were the same as the ones the franchise used during the 1970–71 seasons. Vince Lombardi, who coached Washington in 1969 before dying during the 1970 preseason, was the inspiration behind the helmet. Lombardi pushed for the logo, which sat inside a white circle enclosed within a burgundy circle border, with Native American feathers hanging down from the side because of its similarity to the "G" on the helmets worn by the Green Bay Packers, who he had coached during most of the 1960s.

In a 2008 Monday Night Football game against the Pittsburgh Steelers, Washington wore a monochrome look by wearing burgundy jerseys over burgundy pants. This combination made two further appearances the following season against the Dallas Cowboys and New York Giants. The Redskins, starting in 2010, began to wear the burgundy jersey paired with the gold pants reminiscent of the George Allen era. Against the Tennessee Titans later that season, the team matched the gold pants with the usual white jerseys for the first time. Washington wore the same combination against the Giants on the road two weeks later.

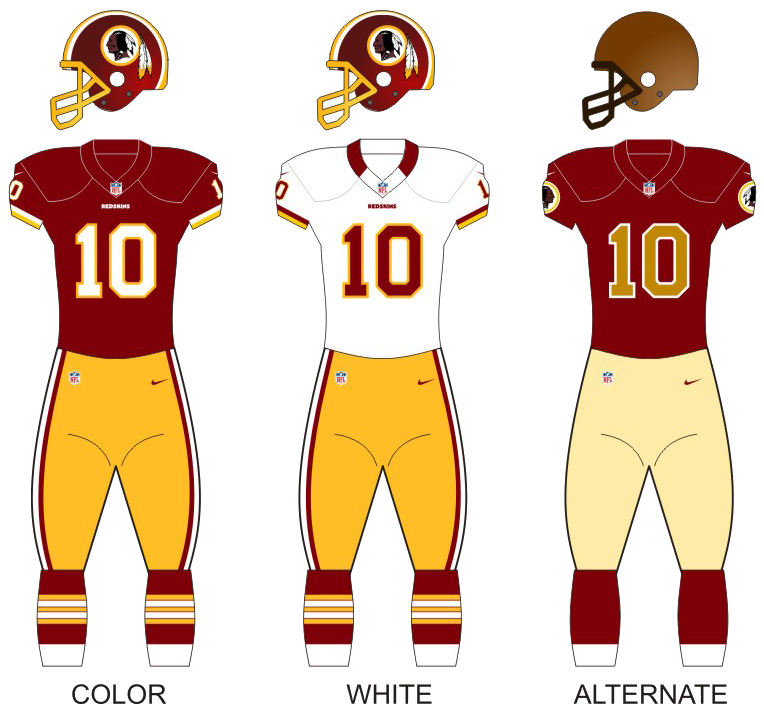
The uniform style worn for a period during the 2010s

In 2011, the Redskins wore the burgundy jersey and gold pants for five home games and a road game at Dallas, the burgundy jersey with white pants for three home games and a road game at Miami, the white jersey and burgundy pants for five road games, and the white jersey and gold pants for a Bills game in Toronto. The following year, the team wore an updated throwback uniform of the 1937 championship team that featured a helmet pattern based on the logo-less leather helmets worn at the time, in a game against the Carolina Panthers. In 2013, a newly implemented NFL rule stated that teams could not wear alternate helmets (thus limiting them to one helmet) on account of player safety. As a result, Washington wore its 1937 throwbacks with the logo removed from the regular helmet in a game versus the San Diego Chargers. That year, the Redskins removed the burgundy collar from their white jerseys in order to have better consistency with the new Nike uniforms that had debuted the previous season.

Between 2014 and 2016, the team wore the gold pants with their standard uniforms, although the burgundy pants returned as part of the team's away uniform later in 2016. In 2017, Washington resurrected the all-burgundy ensemble as part of the NFL Color Rush. Nike initially provided an all-gold uniform but team officials called it "garish" and refused to wear it. In 2018, Washington replaced the gold pants with white for the majority of their home games.

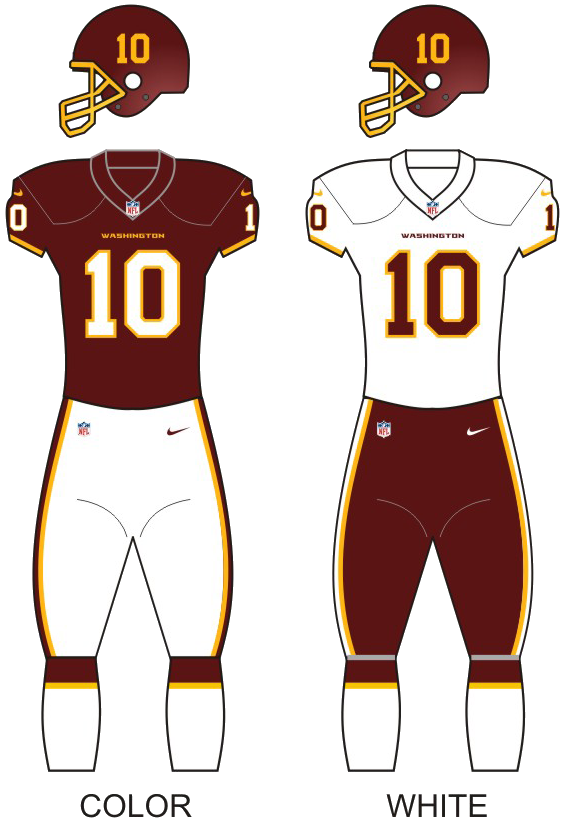
Uniforms worn as the Washington Football Team in 2020 and 2021

During their two season as the Washington Football Team in 2020 and 2021, their logo was a simple "W" with the helmets having player numbers. The Commanders rebranding included new logos and uniforms featuring military-inspired motifs. The primary home uniform remained burgundy with gold and white stripes with the letters having a gold base. The team name is placed atop the numbers in front, which were also gold and trimmed in white. The road white uniform features burgundy and white gradient numbers with black trim, along with burgundy and white gradient and black sleeve stripes. Both sets are paired with either burgundy or white pants. The alternate black uniform features the team name on the left chest in gold, and numbers have a gold base with burgundy trim. Black pants are paired with this uniform with an alternate black helmet having with the "W" logo in front and uniform numbers on each side. A pig mascot, Major Tuddy, was also unveiled near the end of the season. In 2024, gold pants returned to the uniform rotation for the first time since 2018. The standard uniform combination from then on was burgundy-on-gold at home and white-on-burgundy on the road with burgundy socks.

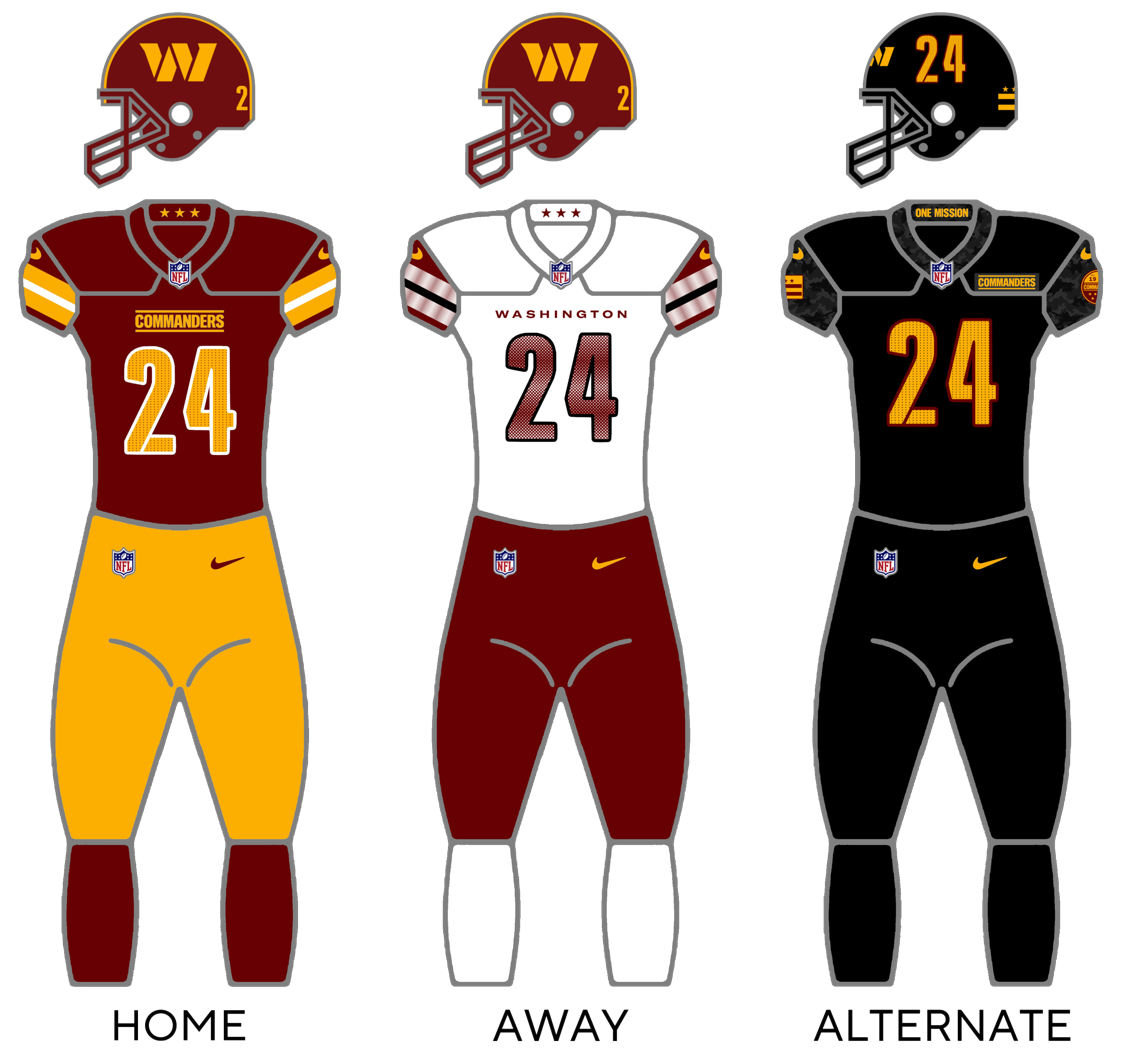
Uniforms worn from 2022 to 2025

The Commanders unveiled alternate throwback uniforms in 2025 based on the set worn during the 1980s, featuring white jerseys and burgundy pants. The helmet was emblazoned with the team's gold W logo in place of the Redskins logo. The following year, the white Super Bowl–era uniforms were promoted to full primary uniforms with a corresponding burgundy home uniform, including white and gold pants. An alternate all-black uniform, nicknamed the "Hail Raiser", was also unveiled using the same template along with a helmet featuring a "Spear W" decal.

=== Redskins branding controversy ===
The team's former Redskins branding, used from 1933 until 2020, was one of the leading examples of the Native American mascot controversy. Various people and groups, such as the National Congress of American Indians (NCAI), considered the name a racial slur and attempted to get the team to change it for decades. In a 2013 letter, Snyder said that while he respected those who said they were offended, a 2004 Annenberg Public Policy Center poll found that 90% of Native Americans were not. This poll was essentially replicated in 2016 by The Washington Post. In 2020, social scientists from the University of Michigan and University of California, Berkeley, measured Native American opinion in detail, finding that 49% had responded that the name was offensive, with the level of offense increasing to 67% for those with a stronger involvement in Native American culture. When the franchise was undergoing a trademark dispute in 2014, the Washington Post announced their editorials would no longer use the "Redskins" name. ESPN updated its policies to allow its reporters to choose how to refer to the team. Some argued the name was too racially charged, while most people believed the branding advocated for and honored the bravery and warrior spirit associated with Native American culture.

After a period of racial unrest triggered by the murder of George Floyd and subsequent protests in 2020, a letter signed by 87 shareholders and investors was sent to team and league sponsors Nike, FedEx, and PepsiCo urging them to cut their ties unless the name was changed. Around the same time, several retail companies began removing Redskins merchandise from their stores. In response, the team underwent a review in July 2020 and announced that it would play as the Washington Football Team after retiring its name and logo.

In 2022, the team rebranded as the Commanders. In 2023, the Native American Guardians Association (NAGA) launched a petition to return to the Redskins branding; NAGA later attempted to sue the Commanders for defamation after team management claimed NAGA was a "fake" association. In 2024, U.S. senator Steve Daines advocated that the NFL honor Blackfeet Nation member Blackie Wetzel in recognition of his role in designing the team's former logo depicting a Native American chief based on John Two Guns White Calf, the last Blackfeet chief. Daines sought to honor the legacy without calling for the return of the Redskins branding, but some viewed the gesture as insufficient compared to addressing more pressing community needs. The Wetzel family said they wished to regain the rights to the logo to use it to raise awareness about social issues on reservations. In November 2024, the U.S. Senate Committee on Energy and Natural Resources voted 17–2 to transfer control of the RFK Stadium site to the District of Columbia. The bill's approval came after negotiations between the team, NFL, and Daines about restoring the Redskins logo, with portions of merchandise proceeds going to Native American causes. In July 2025, President Donald Trump suggested he would block the New Stadium at RFK Campus deal if the team did not return to the Redskins branding.

== Rivalries ==
=== Divisional ===
==== Dallas Cowboys ====
The Commanders' rivalry with the Dallas Cowboys features two teams that have won 31 combined division titles and 10 championships, including eight combined Super Bowls. The rivalry started in 1960 when the Cowboys joined the league as an expansion team. During that year they were in separate conferences, but played once during the season. In 1961, Dallas was placed in the same division as the Redskins, and from that point on, they have played each other twice during every regular season.

Texas oil tycoon Clint Murchison Jr. was having a difficult time bringing an NFL team to Dallas. In 1958, Murchison heard that George Preston Marshall, owner of the Washington Redskins, was eager to sell the team. Just as the sale was about to be finalized, Marshall called for a change in terms. Murchison was outraged and canceled the whole deal. Around this time, Marshall had a falling out with the Redskin band director, Barnee Breeskin. Breeskin had written the music for the team's fight song, now known as "Hail to the Commanders", which gets played by the Washington Commanders Marching Band after every touchdown at home games. He wanted revenge after the failed negotiations with Marshall. He approached Tom Webb, Murchison's lawyer, and sold the rights for $2,500 (equivalent to $27,200 in 2025). Murchison then decided to create his own team, with the support of NFL expansion committee chairman, George Halas. Halas decided to put the proposition of a Dallas franchise before the NFL owners, which needed to have unanimous approval in order to pass. The only owner against the proposal was George Preston Marshall. However, Marshall found out that Murchison owned the rights to Washington's fight song, so a deal was finally struck. If Marshall showed his approval of the Dallas franchise, Murchison would return the song. The Cowboys were then founded and began playing in 1960. At the time in 2016, a matchup between the teams on Thanksgiving was the most-watched regular-season game broadcast by the NFL on Fox. The Cowboys lead the series 78–48–2.

==== Philadelphia Eagles ====
The Commanders' rivalry with the Philadelphia Eagles began in 1934. Washington leads the series 90–87–6.

==== New York Giants ====
The Commanders' rivalry with the New York Giants began in 1932. The Giants lead the all-time series 108–73–5.

=== Other ===
==== Baltimore Ravens (Beltway Bowl) ====
The Commanders have a minor geographic rivalry with the Baltimore Ravens, who play about 40 miles away. The teams play each other annually during the preseason, but rarely during the regular season because they are in different conferences. The Ravens lead the all-time series 5–3. After the Baltimore Colts moved to Indianapolis in 1984, the Washington team's then-owner, Jack Kent Cooke, worked to prevent a new team from settling in the Maryland city. After the Cleveland Browns moved to Baltimore in 1996 and rebranded as the Baltimore Ravens, Cooke put the Redskins' then-new stadium in Landover, Maryland.

== Players ==
=== Roster ===
Washington Commanders roster
**Quarterbacks (QB)**: 5 Jayden Daniels; 16 Athan Kaliakmanis; 8 Marcus Mariota; **Running backs (RB)**: 30 Austin Ekeler; 34 Robert Henry Jr.; 1 Rachaad White; **Wide receivers (WR)**: 13 Treylon Burks; 3 Stefon Diggs; 12 Van Jefferson; 11 Luke McCaffrey KR; 14 Antonio Williams; **Tight ends (TE)**: 87 John Bates; 85 Chig Okonkwo; 82 Ben Sinnott; 80 Colson Yankoff	**Offensive linemen (OL)**: 67 Nick Allegretti C/G; 74 Brandon Coleman T/G; 72 Josh Conerly Jr. T; 76 Sam Cosmi G; 66 Matt Gulbin C; 63 Lucas Patrick C/G; 75 Chris Paul G; 62 Tanoa Togiai G; 71 Andrew Wylie T/G; **Defensive linemen (DL)**: 50 Ricky Barber DT; 95 Jer'Zhan Newton DT; 90 Charles Omenihu DE; 97 Tim Settle DT; 96 Shy Tuttle DT; 91 Deatrich Wise Jr. DE	**Linebackers (LB)**: 92 Dorance Armstrong OLB; 45 K'Lavon Chaisson OLB; 48 Joshua Josephs OLB; 51 Ale Kaho LB; 4 Frankie Luvu MLB; 58 Jordan Magee LB; 56 Kain Medrano MLB; 98 Odafe Oweh OLB; 52 Sonny Styles MLB; **Defensive backs (DB)**: 23 Trey Amos CB; 35 Percy Butler S; 25 Nick Cross S; 29 Rasul Douglas CB; 20 Quan Martin S; 24 Fabian Moreau CB; 18 Tyler Owens S; 39 Jeremy Reaves S; 2 Amik Robertson CB; 0 Mike Sainristil CB; 37 Isaac Yiadom CB; **Special teams (ST)**: 69 Tyler Ott LS; 19 Drew Stevens K; 10 Tress Way P	**Practice squad**: 86 Jaden Bradley WR; 55 Byron Cowart DT; 38 Fred Davis II CB; 88 Nick DeGennaro WR; 93 Daniel Ekuale DT; 61 Julian Good-Jones C/G; 15 Sam Hartman QB; 84 Malik Heath WR; 53 Kyle Kennard LB; 57 Austin Keys LB; 59 T. J. Maguranyanga DE (IPP); 40 Quentin Moore TE; 31 Devin Neal RB; 77 Esa Pole T; 32 Craig Reynolds RB; 73 Trent Scott T/G; 89 Jack Westover TE; **Reserve**: 6 Dyami Brown WR (IR); 54 Leo Chenal LB (IR); 22 Jacory Croskey-Merritt RB (IR); 41 Javontae Jean-Baptiste OLB (IR); 99 Javon Kinlaw DT (IR); 83 Jaylin Lane WR (IR); 17 Terry McLaurin WR (IR); 26 Jeremy McNichols RB (IR); 94 Daron Payne DT (IR); 78 Laremy Tunsil T (IR) 53 active, 16 practice squad (1 IPP), 10 reserve As of November 19, 2026. Rookies in italics.; Roster; Depth chart; Transactions

=== Retired numbers ===
Washington Commanders retired numbers
No.	Player	Position	Tenure	Retired in
**9**	Sonny Jurgensen	QB	1964–1974	2023
**21**	**Sean Taylor**^{1}	FS	2004–2007	2021
**28**	**Darrell Green**	CB	1983–2002	2024
**33**	**Sammy Baugh**	QB / S / P	1937–1952	1953
**44**	John Riggins	RB	1976–1985	2026
**49**	Bobby Mitchell^{1}	HB / WR	1962–1968	2020
**81**	Art Monk	WR	1980–1993	2025
^{1} Number was posthumously retired. Names in **bold** spent entire playing career with the team.

Some numbers are unofficially retired and are withheld from being selected by other players.

- 7 Joe Theismann, QB, 1974–1985
- 42 Charley Taylor, WR, 1964–1977
- 43 Larry Brown, RB, 1969–1976
- 65 Dave Butz, DT, 1975–1988
- 70 Sam Huff, LB, 1964–1969

The use of unofficial retired numbers drew controversy during Steve Spurrier's first year as head coach in 2002. Quarterbacks Danny Wuerffel and Shane Matthews first wore 7 and 9 respectively during training camp. The resulting controversy led to them switching to 17 and 6. Quarterback Dwayne Haskins, the team's first-round draft selection in 2019, wore number 7 with permission from Theismann for his two-year tenure with the team.

=== Pro Football Hall of Fame members ===
**Washington Commanders Hall of Fame enshrinees**
Players
No.	Name	Position	Tenure	Inducted
33	**Sammy Baugh**	QB	1937–1952	1963
35	**Bill Dudley**	RB/CB	1950–1953	1966
20	**Cliff Battles**	RB/CB	1932–1937	1968
40	**Wayne Millner**	TE/DE	1936–1941	1968
17	**Turk Edwards**	OT/DT	1932–1940	1969
70	**Sam Huff**	LB	1964–1969	1982
9	**Sonny Jurgensen**	QB	1964–1974	1983
49	**Bobby Mitchell**	RB/WR	1962–1968	1983
42	**Charley Taylor**	WR	1964–1977	1984
27	**Ken Houston**	S	1973–1980	1986
44	**John Riggins**	RB	1976–1985	1992
26	Paul Krause	S	1964–1967	1998
28	**Darrell Green**	CB	1983–2002	2008
81	**Art Monk**	WR	1980–1993	2008
78	Bruce Smith	DE	2000–2003	2009
68	**Russ Grimm**	G	1981–1991	2010
55	**Chris Hanburger**	LB	1965–1978	2011
21	Deion Sanders	CB	2000	2011
60	Dick Stanfel	G	1956–1958	2016
24	Champ Bailey	CB	1999–2003	2019
Coaches and contributors
Name		Position	Tenure	Inducted
Curly Lambeau		Head coach	1952–1953	1963
**George Preston Marshall**		Founder and owner	1932–1969	1963
Vince Lombardi		Head coach	1969	1971
**Ray Flaherty**		Head coach	1936–1942	1976
**Joe Gibbs**		Head coach	1981–1992; 2004–2007	1996
**George Allen**		Head coach	1971–1977	2002
**Bobby Beathard**		General manager	1978–1989	2018
Names in **bold** spent a majority of their career with the Washington Redskins

=== Ring of Fame ===
When the team left RFK Stadium in 1996, they left behind the signs commemorating the Washington Hall of Stars. The team began a new tradition of honoring Redskins greats via the "Ring of Fame", a set of signs on the upper-level facade at Northwest Stadium. Team founder George Preston Marshall was removed in 2020, the only member to lose his place in the ring.

Washington Commanders Ring of Fame members
No.	Player	Position	Tenure
—	George Allen	Head coach	1971–1977
41	Mike Bass	CB	1969–1975
20	Cliff Battles	RB	1932–1937
33	Sammy Baugh	QB	1937–1952
—	Bobby Beathard	General manager	1978–1988
53	Jeff Bostic	C	1980–1993
80	Gene Brito	DE	1951–1953; 1955–1958
43	Larry Brown	RB	1969–1976
65	Dave Butz	DT	1975–1988
84	Gary Clark	WR	1985–1992
51	Monte Coleman	LB	1979–1994
—	Jack Kent Cooke	Owner & Chairman	1961–1997
35	Bill Dudley	RB	1950–1951, 1953
—	Wayne Curry	Prince George's County executive	1994–2002
37	Pat Fischer	CB	1968–1977
59	London Fletcher	MLB	2007–2013
—	Joe Gibbs	Head coach	1981–1992; 2004–2007
28	Darrell Green	CB	1983–2002
68	Russ Grimm	G	1981–1991
55	Chris Hanburger	LB	1965–1978
57	Ken Harvey	LB	1994–1998
56	Len Hauss	C	1964–1977
—	Phil Hochberg	PA announcer	1963–2000
27	Ken Houston	S	1973–1980
70	Sam Huff	LB	1964–1967, 1969
66	Joe Jacoby	OT	1981–1993
47	Dick James	RB	1956–1963
9	Sonny Jurgensen	QB	1964–1974
22	Charlie Justice	RB	1950, 1952–1954
17	Billy Kilmer	QB	1971–1978
14	Eddie LeBaron	QB	1952–1953; 1955–1959
—	Vince Lombardi	Head coach/General manager	1969
72	Dexter Manley	DE	1981–1989
71	Charles Mann	DE	1983–1993
40	Wayne Millner	E	1936–1941, 1945
49	Bobby Mitchell	HB / executive	1962–2002
30	Brian Mitchell	RB / RS	1990–1999
81	Art Monk	WR	1980–1993
3	Mark Moseley	K	1974–1986
89	Santana Moss	WR	2005–2014
23	Brig Owens	CB	1966–1977
16	Richie Petitbon	S / coach	1971–1972; 1978–1993
65	Vince Promuto	G	1960–1970
44	John Riggins	RB	1976–1985
11	Mark Rypien	QB	1986–1993
60	Chris Samuels	OT	2000–2009
87	Jerry Smith	TE	1965–1977
42	Charley Taylor	WR/coach	1964–1977 1981–1993
21	Sean Taylor	S	2004–2007
7	Joe Theismann	QB	1974–1985
—	Bubba Tyer	Athletic trainer	1971–2002; 2004–2008
17	Doug Williams	QB	1986–1989

=== 90 Greatest ===
For the Redskins' 70th anniversary in 2002, a panel selected the "70 Greatest Redskins", player and coaches who were honored in a weekend of festivities, including a halftime ceremony during a Redskins' game against the Indianapolis Colts. In 2012, ten players and personnel were added to the list for the team's 80th anniversary. In 2022, ten more were added for the franchise's 90th anniversary.

The panel that chose the 70 consisted of former news anchor Bernard Shaw; former player Bobby Mitchell; Senator George Allen (son of coach George Allen); broadcaster Ken Beatrice; Noel Epstein, editor for The Washington Post; former diplomat Joseph J. Sisco; Phil Hochberg, who retired in 2001 after 38 years as team stadium announcer; Pro Football Hall of Fame historian Joe Horrigan; sportscaster George Michael; sports director Andy Pollin; NFL Films president Steven Sabol; and news anchor Jim Vance.

The list includes three head coaches and 67 players, of which 41 were offensive players, 23 defensive players, and three special teams players. Among the 70 Greatest, there are 92 Super Bowl appearances, with 47 going once and 45 playing in more than one. 29 members possess one Super Bowl ring and 26 have more than one. Also, before the Super Bowl, members of the 70 made 18 World Championship appearances including six that participated in the Redskins' NFL Championship victories in 1937 and 1942. Bold indicates people elected to the Pro Football Hall of Fame.

90 Greatest Washington Commanders
No.	Player	Position	Tenure
21	Terry Allen	RB	1995–1998
56	LaVar Arrington	LB	2000–2005
24	**Champ Bailey**	CB	1999–2003
41	Mike Bass	CB	1969–1975
20	**Cliff Battles**	B	1932–1937
33	**Sammy Baugh**	QB	1937–1952
31	Don Bosseler	FB	1957–1964
53	Jeff Bostic	C	1980–1993
4	Mike Bragg	P	1968–1979
80	Gene Brito	DE	1951–1953; 1955–1958
43	Larry Brown	RB	1969–1976
77	Bill Brundige	DE	1970–1977
65	Dave Butz	DT	1975–1988
21	Earnest Byner	RB	1989–1993
84	Gary Clark	WR	1985–1992
51	Monte Coleman	LB	1979–1994
47	Chris Cooley	TE	2004–2012
48	Stephen Davis	RB	1996–2002
53	Al DeMao	C	1945–1953
36	Chuck Drazenovich	LB	1950–1959
35	**Bill Dudley**	RB	1950–1951, 1953
17	**Turk Edwards**	OT	1932–1940
44	Andy Farkas	FB	1938–1944
37	Pat Fischer	CB	1968–1977
59	London Fletcher	LB	2007–2013
77	Darryl Grant	DT	1981–1990
28	**Darrell Green**	CB	1983–2002
68	**Russ Grimm**	G	1981–1991
23	DeAngelo Hall	CB	2008–2017
55	**Chris Hanburger**	LB	1965–1978
57	Ken Harvey	LB	1994–1998
56	Len Hauss	C	1964–1977
75	Terry Hermeling	OT	1970–1980
27	**Ken Houston**	S	1973–1980
70	**Sam Huff**	LB	1964–1967, 1969
66	Joe Jacoby	OT/G	1981–1993
47	Dick James	RB	1955–1963
76	Jon Jansen	OT	1999–2008
80	Roy Jefferson	WR	1971–1976
9	**Sonny Jurgensen**	QB	1964–1974
22	Charlie Justice	RB	1950, 1952–1954
91	Ryan Kerrigan	LB/DE	2011–2020
17	Billy Kilmer	QB	1971–1978
26	**Paul Krause**	S	1964–1967
79	Jim Lachey	OT	1988–1995
14	Eddie LeBaron	QB	1952–1953; 1955–1959
72	Dexter Manley	DE	1981–1989
71	Charles Mann	DE	1983–1993
58	Wilber Marshall	LB	1988–1992
73	Mark May	OT	1981–1989
79	Ron McDole	DE	1971–1978
63	Raleigh McKenzie	G	1985–1994
53	Harold McLinton	LB	1969–1978
40	**Wayne Millner**	E/DE	1936–1941, 1945
49	**Bobby Mitchell**	FL	1962–1968
30	Brian Mitchell	RB/RS	1990–1999
81	**Art Monk**	WR	1980–1993
3	Mark Moseley	K	1974–1986
89	Santana Moss	WR	2005–2014
29	Mark Murphy	S	1977–1984
21	Mike Nelms	KR	1980–1984
52	Neal Olkewicz	LB	1979–1989
23	Brig Owens	DB	1966–1977
26	Clinton Portis	RB	2004–2010
65	Vince Promuto	G	1960–1970
44	**John Riggins**	RB	1976–1985
11	Mark Rypien	QB	1987–1993
83	Ricky Sanders	WR	1986–1993
60	Chris Samuels	OT	2000–2009
76	Ed Simmons	OT	1987–1997
87	Jerry Smith	TE	1965–1977
60	**Dick Stanfel**	G	1956–1958
74	George Starke	OT	1973–1984
72	Diron Talbert	DT	1971–1980
42	**Charley Taylor**	WR	1964–1977
84	Hugh Taylor	WR	1947–1954
21	Sean Taylor	S	2004–2007
7	Joe Theismann	QB	1974–1985
67	Rusty Tillman	LB	1970–1977
85	Don Warren	TE	1979–1992
25	Joe Washington	RB	1981–1984
17	Doug Williams	QB	1986–1989
71	Trent Williams	OT	2010–2019
—	**George Allen**	Head coach	1971–1977
—	**Bobby Beathard**	General manager	1978–1989
—	Joe Bugel	OL coach	1981–1989; 2004–2009
—	**Ray Flaherty**	Head coach	1936–1942
—	**Joe Gibbs**	Head coach	1981–1992; 2004–2007
—	Larry Peccatiello	Defensive coordinator	1981–1993
—	Richie Petitbon	Defensive coordinator	1978–1992

=== Individual awards ===
Most Valuable Player
Season	Player	Position
1972	Larry Brown	RB
1982	Mark Moseley	K
1983	Joe Theismann	QB

Offensive Player of the Year
Season	Player	Position
1972	Larry Brown	RB
1983	Joe Theismann	QB

Offensive Rookie of the Year
Season	Player	Position
1975	Mike Thomas	RB
2012	Robert Griffin III	QB
2024	Jayden Daniels	QB

Defensive Rookie of the Year
Season	Player	Position
2020	Chase Young	DE

Comeback Player of the Year
Season	Player	Position
2020	Alex Smith	QB

Coach of the Year
Season	Coach
1971	George Allen
1979	Jack Pardee
1982	Joe Gibbs
1983	Joe Gibbs

Super Bowl MVP
Super Bowl	Player	Position
XVII	John Riggins	RB
XXII	Doug Williams	QB
XXVI	Mark Rypien	QB

== Staff ==
=== Owners ===
List of franchise owners
Owner	Years	Notes
George Preston Marshall	1932–1965	Founded the team in 1932 as the Boston Braves, and renamed it the Redskins the following year. Moved the franchise to Washington, D.C., in 1937. Last owner in the NFL to integrate black players, refusing to do so until 1962 amid pressure from the U.S. government. Suffered various health ailments by the early 1960s, granting a conservatorship to board members Charles Leo DeOrsey, Edward Bennett Williams, and Milton King in 1963. Oversaw NFL Championships in 1937 and 1942.
Edward Bennett Williams	1965–1979	Appointed by Marshall in 1965 to manage the team in his stead. Acquired Marshall's shares in the franchise following his death in 1969. Served as team president from 1966 to 1984. Oversaw an NFC Championship in 1972.
Jack Kent Cooke	1979–1997	A minority shareholder since 1961 and vice president since 1965, Cooke purchased majority interest from Williams in 1974 and replaced him as controlling owner in 1979. Led the construction of Jack Kent Cooke Stadium, now Northwest Stadium, which opened in 1997. Oversaw Super Bowl wins in 1982, 1987, and 1991. Died in 1997.
John Kent Cooke	1997–1999	Cooke, the son of Jack, operated the franchise following his father's death. He had previously been the team's executive vice president since 1981.
Daniel Snyder	1999–2023	Acquired the team from Cooke's estate in 1999 for $800 million. Considered to be one of the worst owners in the history of professional sports, a 2022 United States Congress report found Snyder fostered a workplace rife with sexual misconduct and bullying and was liable for financial improprieties such as withholding security deposits from season ticket holders and paying hush money to accusers. Opposed calls to change the controversial Redskins branding until 2020 amid growing pressure from sponsors, with the franchise playing as the Washington Football Team before its renaming as the Commanders in 2022. Was represented by his wife Tanya at NFL events after he was suspended by the league in 2021.
Josh Harris	2023–present	Acquired the team from Snyder in 2023 for $6.05 billion. Managing partner of a group that includes Danaher and Glenstone founder Mitchell Rales, Hall of Fame basketball player Magic Johnson, and venture capitalist Mark Ein as limited partners. Other minority partners include business partner David Blitzer and investors Lee Ainslie, Eric Holoman, Michael Li, Marc Lipschultz, Mitchell Morgan, the Santo Domingo Group, Michael Sapir, Eric Schmidt, and Andy Snyder.

=== Front office and coaches ===
Washington Commanders staff
Front office: Managing partner – Josh Harris; Limited partners – Mitchell Rales, Magic Johnson, Mark Ein; General manager – Adam Peters; Assistant general manager – Lance Newmark; Senior vice president of football operations – Brandon Sosna; Senior advisor to the general manager – Doug Williams; President – Mark Clouse; Vice president of football administration – Rob Rogers; Director of player personnel – David Blackburn; Director of college scouting – Ryan Kessenich; Director of pro scouting – Chris White; Senior personnel executive – Demitrius Washington; National scouts – Dwaune Jones, Jeff Beathard; Special advisor – Bob Myers; Head coach: Head coach – Dan Quinn; Offensive coaches: Offensive coordinator – David Blough; Offensive pass game coordinator – David Raih; Quarterbacks – D. J. Williams; Assistant quarterbacks – Danny Etling; Running backs – Anthony Lynn; Assistant running backs – Jesse Madden; Wide receivers – Bobby Engram; Assistant wide receivers/returners – Andre Coleman; Tight ends – Wes Welker; Offensive line – Darnell Stapleton; Assistant offensive line – Shane Toub; Offensive quality control – Brian Stoldt; Offensive assistant – Nick Charlton	Defensive coaches: Defensive coordinator – Daronte Jones; Defensive line/run game coordinator – Eric Henderson; Assistant defensive line – Darryl Tapp; Linebackers – Ken Norton Jr.; Outside linebackers – John Pagano; Assistant linebackers – George Banko; Cornerbacks – William Gay; Safeties – Tommy Donatell; Defensive quality control – Luke Johnson; Special teams coaches: Special teams coordinator – Larry Izzo; Assistant special teams – Brian Schneider, John Glenn; Support staff and coaches: Senior director of football operations – Bryan Porter; Senior director of team support and advancement – Dylan Thompson; Senior director of player health and performance – Geoff Kaplan; Head strength and conditioning – Chad Englehart; Head athletic trainer – Al Bellamy; Director of player performance – Brett Nenaber; Director of process innovation – Cody Cejda; Director of football solutions – Seenu Tulluri; Director of football R&D – Doug Drewry; Coaching chief of staff – Sarah Hogan; → Coaching staff → Front office → More NFL staffs

=== Command Force ===
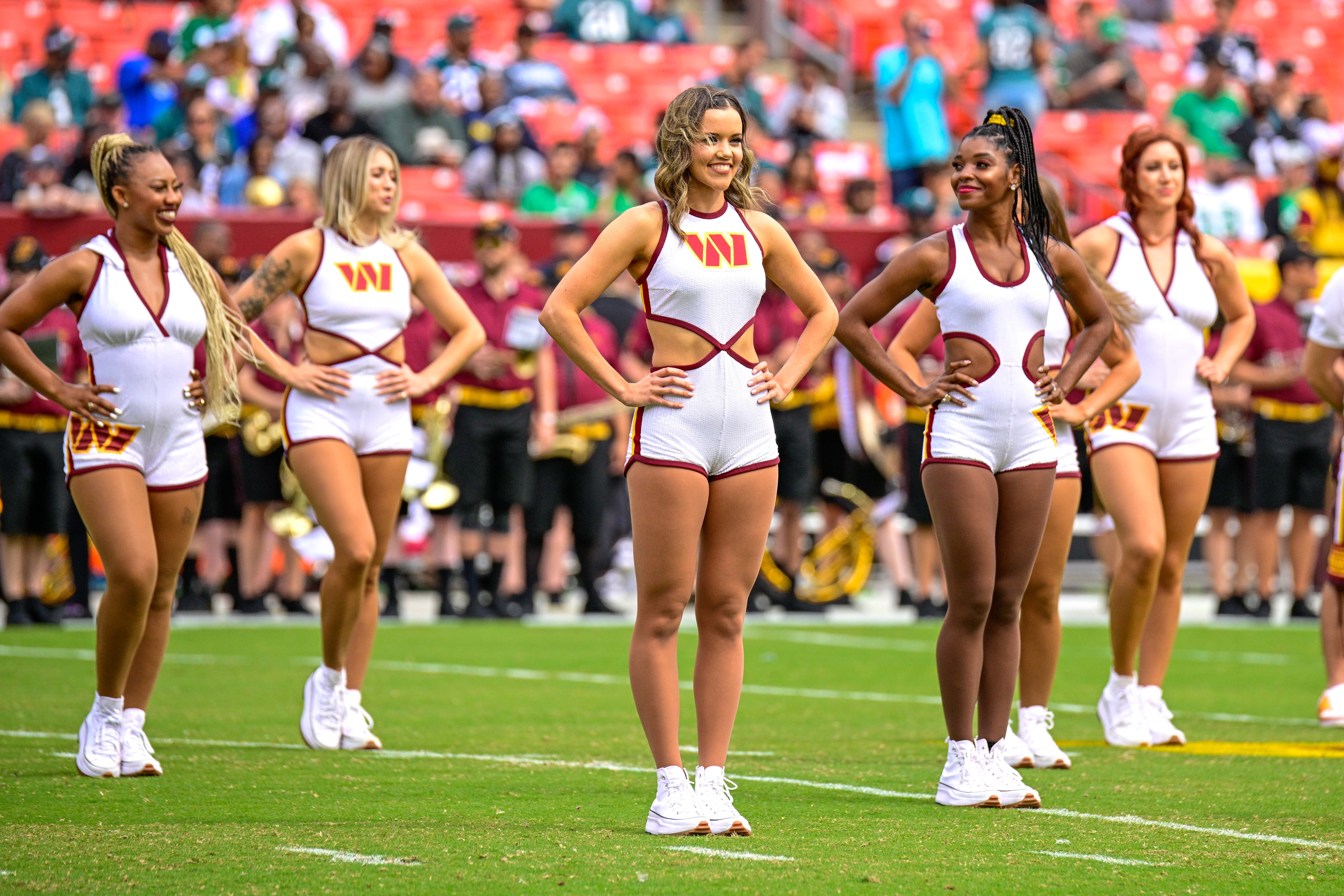
The Command Force in 2022

The Command Force is the team's professional dance and performance group. They were formed in 1962 as a cheerleading squad called the Redskinettes, then renamed the Command Force upon the team's rebranding as the Commanders in 2022. As cheerleaders, they were sometimes referred to as the First Ladies of Football.

== Records ==
=== Franchise ===
Single-game

- Passing yards: 471 Brad Johnson (1999)
- Passing touchdowns: 6 Sammy Baugh (1943, 1947), Mark Rypien (1991)
- Completions: 33 Jason Campbell (2007), Kirk Cousins (2015)
- Completion percentage (minimum 20 attempts): 91.3% Jayden Daniels (2024)
- Rushing yards: 221 Gerald Riggs (1989)
- Rushing touchdowns: 3 (several)
- Receptions: 14 Roy Helu (2011)
- Receiving yards: 255 Anthony Allen (1987)
- Receiving touchdowns: 3 (several)
- Tackles: 17 Jessie Armstead (2002)
- Sacks: 4 Dexter Manley (1988), Ken Harvey (1997), Phillip Daniels (2005), Brian Orakpo (2009), Ryan Kerrigan (2014)
- Forced fumbles: 3 Ryan Anderson (2019)
- Interceptions: 4 DeAngelo Hall (2010)
- Field goals: 7 Austin Seibert (2024)
- Punts: 11 Mike Bragg (1976)

Season

- Passing yards: 4,917 Kirk Cousins (2016)
- Passing touchdowns: 31 Sonny Jurgensen (1967)
- Completions: 406 Kirk Cousins (2016)
- Rushing yards: 1,613 Alfred Morris (2012)
- Rushing touchdowns: 24 John Riggins (1983)
- Receptions: 113 Pierre Garçon (2013)
- Receiving yards: 1,483 Santana Moss (2005)
- Receiving touchdowns: 13 Terry McLaurin (2024)
- Tackles: 101 London Fletcher (2007)
- Sacks: 18.5 Dexter Manley (1986)
- Forced fumbles: 6 LaVar Arrington (2003)
- Interceptions: 13 Dan Sandifer (1948)
- Field goals: 33 Mark Moseley (1983)
- Points: 161 Mark Moseley (1983)
- Kickoff return average (minimum 5 returns): 42.8 yards Hall Haynes (1950)
- Punts: 103 Mike Bragg (1978), Tom Tupa (2004)
- Punt return average (minimum 5 returns): 24.3 yards Derrick Shepard (1987)
- Punting average: 51.4 yards Sammy Baugh (1940)

Career

- Passing yards: 25,206 Joe Theismann (1974–1985)
- Passing touchdowns: 187 Sammy Baugh (1937–1952)
- Rushing yards: 7,472 John Riggins (1976–1985)
- Rushing touchdowns: 79 John Riggins (1976–1985)
- Receptions: 889 Art Monk (1980–1993)
- Receiving yards: 12,029 Art Monk (1980–1993)
- Receiving touchdowns: 79 Charley Taylor (1964–1977)
- Tackles: 1,162 Darrell Green (1983–2002)
- Sacks: 95.5 Ryan Kerrigan (2011–2020)
- Forced fumbles: 26 Ryan Kerrigan (2011–2020)
- Interceptions: 54 Darrell Green (1983–2002)
- Field goals: 263 Mark Moseley (1974–1986)
- Longest field goal: 61 yards Joey Slye (2023)
- Points: 1,207 Mark Moseley (1974–1986)
- Kickoff return average (minimum 25 returns): 28.5 Bobby Mitchell (1962–1968)
- Punts: 896 Mike Bragg (1968–1979)
- Punt return average (minimum 25 returns): 13.8 Bob Seymour (1941–1944)
- Punting average: 45.1 Sammy Baugh (1937–1952)

=== NFL ===
Offense

- The Redskins scored 541 points in 1983, which is the sixth highest total in a season of all time.
- The Redskins' 72 points against the New York Giants on November 27, 1966, are the most points ever scored by an NFL team in a regular-season game, and the 72–41 score amounted to 113 points and the highest-scoring game ever in NFL history. The second-half scoring for the game amounted to 65 points, the second-highest point total for second-half scoring and the third-highest total scoring in any half in NFL history. The Redskins' 10 touchdowns are the most by a team in a single game, and the 16 total touchdowns are the most combined for a game. The Redskins' nine PATs are the second-most all-time for a single game, and the 14 combined PATs are the most ever in a game.
- The Redskins set a record for most first downs in a game with 39 in a game against the Lions on November 4, 1990. They also set a record by not allowing a single first down against the Giants on September 27, 1942.
- The Redskins have led the league in passing eight times: in 1938, 1940, 1944, 1947–48, 1967, 1974 and 1989. Only the San Diego Chargers have led more times. The Redskins led the league in completion percentage 11 times: in 1937, 1939–1940, 1942–45, 1947–48 and 1969–1970, second only to the San Francisco 49ers. Their four straight years from 1942 to 1945 is the second longest streak.
- The Redskins' nine sacks allowed in 1991 are the third-fewest allowed in a season.
- The Redskins completed 43 passes in an overtime win against Detroit on November 4, 1990, second-most all-time.

Defense

- The Redskins recovered eight opponent's fumbles against the St. Louis Cardinals on October 25, 1976, the most ever in one game.
- The Redskins allowed 82 first downs in 1937, third fewest all-time.
- The Redskins have led the league in fewest total yards allowed five times, 1935–37, 1939, and 1946, which is the third most. Their three consecutive years from 1935 to 1937 is an NFL record.
- The Redskins have led the league in fewest passing yards allowed seven times, in 1939, 1942, 1945, 1952–53, 1980, and 1985, second only to Green Bay (10).
- The Redskins had 61 defensive turnovers in 1983, the third most all-time. The turnover differential of +43 that year was the highest of all time.
- The Redskins had only 12 defensive turnovers in 2006, the fewest in a 16-game season and second all time (the Baltimore Colts had 11 turnovers in the strike-shortened 1982 season which lasted only nine games.)

Special teams

- The Redskins led the league in field goals for eight seasons, 1945, 1956, 1971, 1976–77, 1979, 1982, 1992. Only the Green Bay Packers have ever led more.
- The Redskins and Bears attempted an NFL record 11 field goals on November 14, 1971, and the Redskins and Giants tied that mark on November 14, 1976.
- The Redskins 28 consecutive games, from 1988 to 1990, scoring a field goal is third all time.
- The Redskins have led the league in punting average six times, in 1940–43, 1945, and 1958, second only to the Denver Broncos. Their four consecutive years from 1940 to 1943 is an NFL record.
- The Redskins have led the league in average kick return yards eight times, in 1942, 1947, 1962–63, 1973–74, 1981, and 1995, more than any other team.

== Broadcasting ==
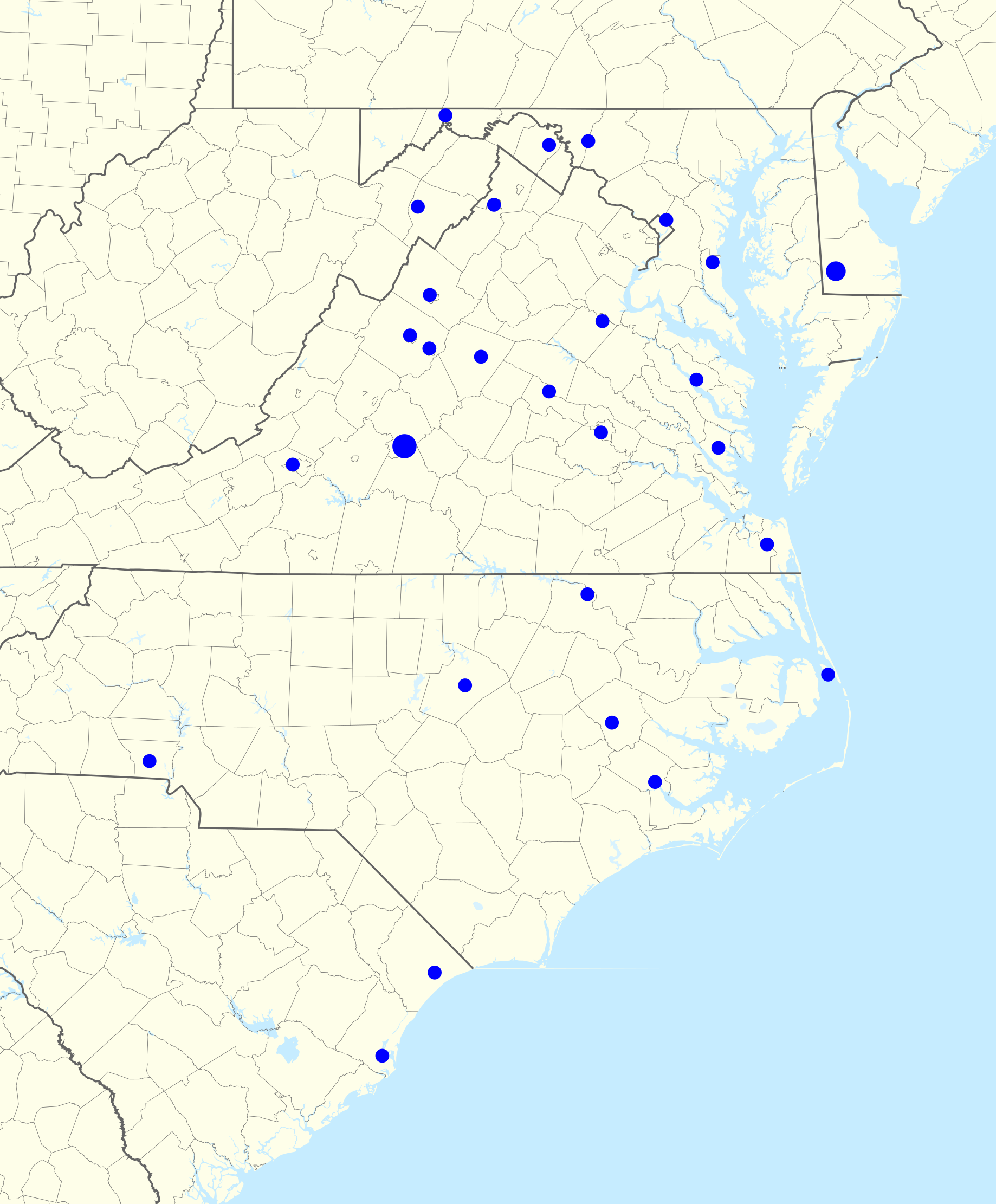
Map of radio affiliates as of 2015

The Commanders' flagship station is Big 100 (WBIG-FM), which acquired the rights in 2022 as part of an agreement with iHeartMedia. Frank Herzog served the team's lead play-by-play announcer from 1979 until 2004, when he was replaced by Larry Michael. Herzog was joined from 1981 by former Redskins Sonny Jurgensen and Sam Huff. Michael retired in 2020 and was replaced by Bram Weinstein. Weinstein is joined by color commentators and former players London Fletcher and Logan Paulsen. Julie Donaldson served as host from 2020 to 2023 and was the first woman to be an on-air broadcaster for an NFL team.

WMAL served as the team's flagship station from 1942 to 1956 and from 1963 through 1991. From 1992 to 1994, WTEM—which had become DC's first all-sports radio station—became the Redskins' flagship station after which they moved to WJFK-FM. In 2006, after WJFK and CBS Radio declined to renew its rights to the team, the Redskins moved to WWXT, WWXX, and WXTR. The stations had recently been bought by Red Zebra Broadcasting—a group co-owned by Snyder—and had become a sports radio trimulcast known as "Triple X ESPN Radio". Red Zebra Broadcasting would eventually acquire WTEM in 2008, making it the originating station of the simulcast.

In 2017, Cumulus Media reached an agreement to carry the team's radio broadcasts on WMAL, marking its return to the station for the first time since 1991. As part of the agreement, WTEM remained the team's official flagship. In 2018, WTEM was sold to Urban One, but maintained its rights to the team. In June 2019, WMAL flipped to sports radio itself as WSBN, taking over the local ESPN Radio affiliation from WTEM; WMAL's previous conservative talk format moved exclusively to its FM simulcast station.

Telecasts of preseason games were previously carried by NBC Sports Washington in the Mid-Atlantic region. Sister NBC owned-and-operated station WRC-TV was the team's "official" broadcast television station, simulcasting the preseason games and airing other team-produced programs during the season. With the sale of NBC Sports Washington by NBCUniversal to Washington Capitals and Washington Wizards owner Ted Leonsis, the network declined to renew its rights to the team. Most regular season Commanders games are carried by NFL on Fox (aired locally on Fox O&O WTTG). In June 2024, the team and WUSA announced a partnership to broadcast the team's preseason games as well as some original content. WUSA also airs select regular season Commanders games via NFL on CBS.

== U.S. presidential election superstition ==
Between 1932 and 2008, for 19 of 20 United States presidential elections, a win for the Redskins in their last home game prior to Election Day coincided with the incumbent party winning re-election. The exception was in 2004, when Republican incumbent George W. Bush won re-election despite the Green Bay Packers beating the Redskins. The trend subsequently came to an end when in 2012, Democratic incumbent Barack Obama won re-election despite the Redskins losing to the Carolina Panthers. It has since been wrong for the elections in 2016, 2020, and 2024.
