= Montez Sweat =

American football player (born 1996)

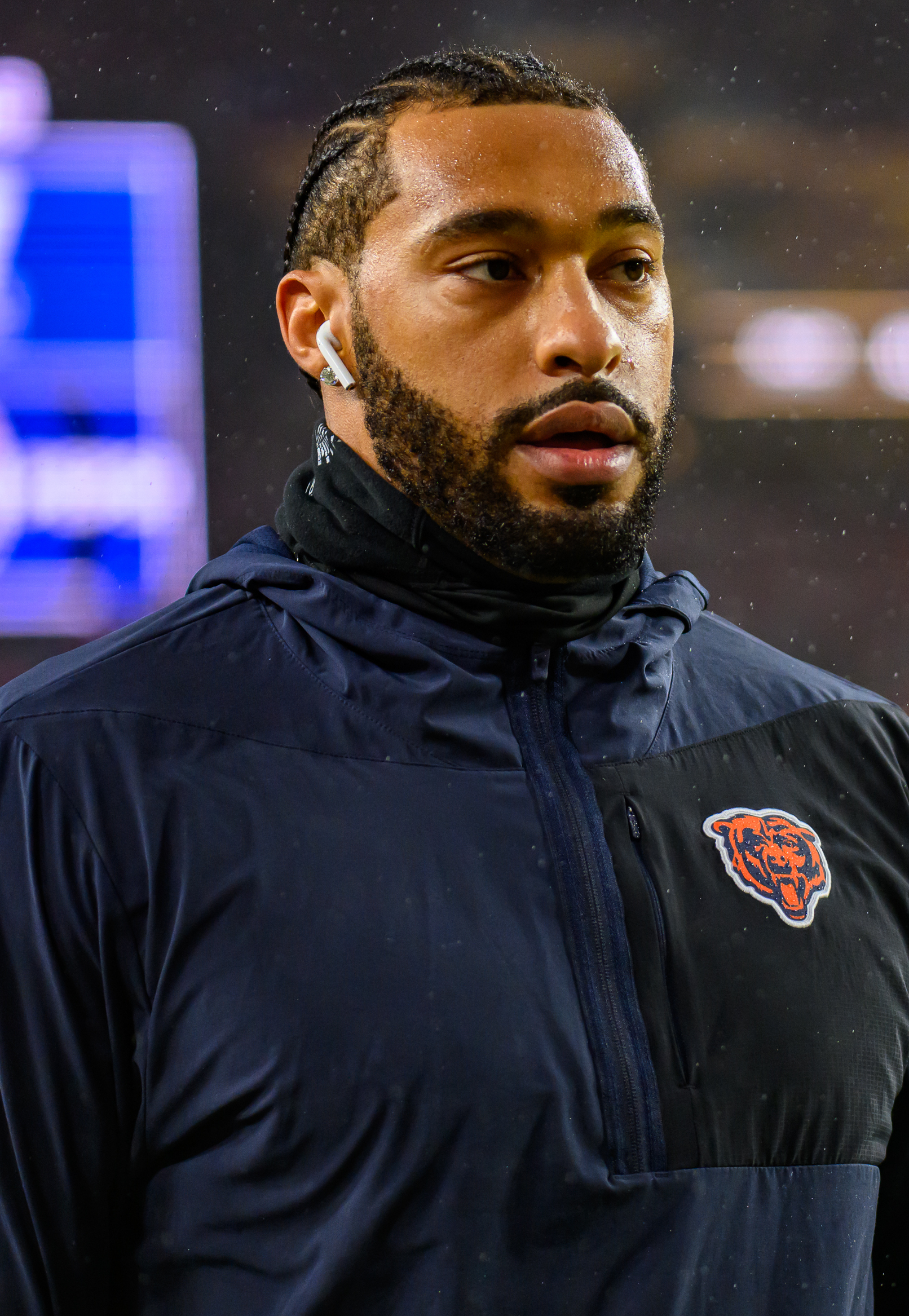
- Sweat with the Chicago Bears in 2025

No. 98 – Chicago Bears
- Position: Defensive end
- Roster status: Active

Personal information
- Born: September 4, 1996 (age 30); Richmond, Kentucky, U.S.
- Listed height: 6 ft 6 in (1.98 m)
- Listed weight: 270 lb (122 kg)

Career information
- High school: Stephenson (Stone Mountain, Georgia)
- College: Michigan State (2014–2015); Copiah–Lincoln (2016); Mississippi State (2017–2018)
- NFL draft: 2019: 1st round, 26th overall pick

Career history
- Washington Redskins / Football Team / Commanders (2019–2023); Chicago Bears (2023–present)

Awards and highlights
- Pro Bowl (2023); First-team All-American (2018); 2× first-team All-SEC (2017, 2018)

Career NFL statistics as of Week 9, 2026
- Total tackles: 322
- Sacks: 60.0
- Pass deflections: 21
- Interceptions: 1
- Forced fumbles: 16
- Fumble recoveries: 1
- Defensive touchdowns: 1
- Stats at Pro Football Reference

Shaquan Montez Sweat (born September 4, 1996) is an American professional football defensive end for the Chicago Bears of the National Football League (NFL). He played college football for the Michigan State Spartans, Copiah–Lincoln Wolves, and Mississippi State Bulldogs before being selected by the Washington Redskins in the first round of the 2019 NFL draft. Sweat was traded to the Bears mid-way through the 2023 season, with whom he received his first Pro Bowl selection.

== Early life ==
Sweat attended Stephenson High School in Stone Mountain, Georgia, where he was rated as one of the top defensive ends in the country. He committed to Michigan State to play college football.

== College career ==
Sweat played in two games for Michigan State in 2014, recording one sack, before redshirting in 2015. He left Michigan State in 2016 and enrolled at the Copiah–Lincoln Community College in Mississippi, where he also played for their football team. In 2017, he left again to play for the Mississippi State Bulldogs. In his first season at Mississippi State, Sweat registered 10.5 sacks and was named to the 2017 All-Southeastern Conference (SEC) football team. He then followed up by recording 12 sacks as a senior in 2018, making the 2018 All-SEC football team and being named an All-American.

== Professional career ==
Pre-draft measurables
Height	Weight	Arm length	Hand span	Wingspan	40-yard dash	10-yard split	20-yard split	20-yard shuttle	Three-cone drill	Vertical jump	Broad jump	Bench press
6 ft 5 3/4 in (1.97 m)	260 lb (118 kg)	35 3/4 in (0.91 m)	10 1/2 in (0.27 m)	7 ft 0 3/4 in (2.15 m)	4.41 s	1.50 s	2.57 s	4.29 s	7.00 s	36 in (0.91 m)	10 ft 5 in (3.18 m)	21 reps
All values from NFL Combine

At the 2019 NFL Combine, Montez set a combine record for a defensive lineman running the 40 yard dash at 4.41 seconds. At the same time, Sweat was diagnosed with hypertrophic cardiomyopathy at his combine health physical. However, it was soon discovered to have been a misdiagnosis due to an improper measuring of his heart. Sweat was eventually selected by the Washington Redskins in the first round, 26th overall, of the 2019 NFL draft. The team traded back up into the first round to select him after using their original pick on Dwayne Haskins.

=== Washington Redskins / Football Team / Commanders ===
Sweat signed his four-year rookie contract with the Redskins on May 29, 2019, worth $11.6 million, including a $6.4 million signing bonus. Before the start of the 2019 season, Sweat was named one of the starting outside linebackers along with Ryan Kerrigan. In Week 3 against the Chicago Bears on Monday Night Football, Sweat recorded his first career sack in a 31–15 loss. In Week 17 against the Dallas Cowboys, Sweat sacked Dak Prescott twice, one of which was a forced fumble that was recovered, during a 47–16 loss.

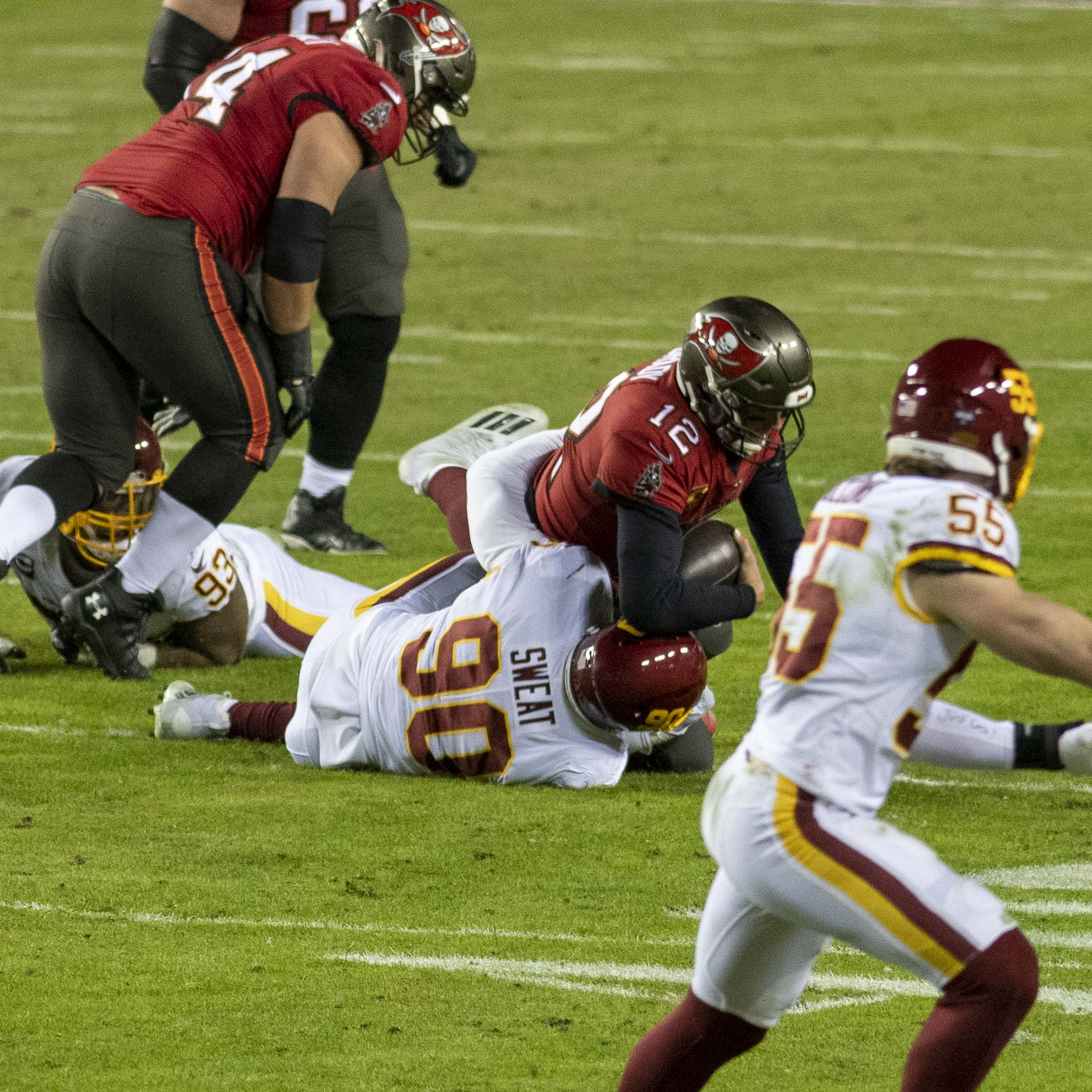
Sweat sacking Tom Brady in the 2020–21 Wild Card Playoff game against the Tampa Bay Buccaneers

During the 2020 offseason, Sweat switched back to the defensive end position after new defensive coordinator, Jack Del Rio, implemented a 4–3 defense. In a game against the Dallas Cowboys on Thanksgiving in 2020, Sweat intercepted a pass thrown by Dalton late in the fourth quarter and returned it 15 yards for a touchdown that led to a 41–16 Washington victory. The following week against the Pittsburgh Steelers, Sweat tipped a pass late in the fourth quarter that led to an interception by Jon Bostic to help secure a 23–17 win over the then-undefeated Steelers. In Week 15 Sweat batted a pass by Seattle Seahawks quarterback Russell Wilson which was then intercepted by Daron Payne.

Sweat suffered a jaw fracture during a Week 8 game against the Denver Broncos in 2021 and was placed on injured reserve. After testing positive, he was placed on the COVID-19 reserve list on December 8, 2021. On December 18, he was taken off the COVID-19 list and placed back on the active roster two days later. In the Week 15 against the Philadelphia Eagles, Sweat recorded a sack and forced a fumble, which was recovered by Landon Collins, on quarterback Jalen Hurts.

On April 27, 2022, the Commanders exercised the fifth-year option in Sweat's contract. In Week 5, Sweat accounted for two of the five sacks the Commanders had against the Tennessee Titans. He contributed another two-sack performance against the Houston Texans in Week 11.

=== Chicago Bears ===
On October 31, 2023, Sweat was traded to the Chicago Bears for a second-round pick in the 2024 NFL draft. Four days later, he signed a four-year contract extension worth $98 million, including $72 million guaranteed. He recorded his first sack as a Bear in Week 11 against the Detroit Lions in their 31–26 loss. On January 3, 2024, Sweat was named a Pro Bowler for the first time. He finished the season a career-high 12.5 sacks across two teams in 2023, collecting 6.5 while with the Commanders before adding another 6 with the Bears. He became the first player in NFL history to lead two teams in sacks during a single season. Matt Eberflus, the Bears head coach, referred to Sweat's impact as the "'Tez effect", which allowed the other players around him to generate more sacks, quarterback pressures, and turnovers. After the season, he was ranked 82nd on the NFL Top 100 Players of 2024.

Chicago's defensive line struggled in 2024, ranking as among the worst in winning its pass rush engagements and stopping runs at the line of scrimmage. Sweat's production declined from the previous year with just 5.5 sacks, which led the Bears. Excluding his injury-shortened 2021 season, he posted career lows in sacks, tackles, quarterback hits, and pressures. He also struggled with ankle, toe, and shin injuries, which caused him to miss the Week 9 game against the Arizona Cardinals. In June 2025, he described the 2024 season as "just a disappointing year" due to his injuries and the Bears missing the playoffs.

For the 2025 season, new Bears head coach Ben Johnson brought in former New Orleans Saints coach Dennis Allen as the defensive coordinator. Sweat described Allen as a "very complex individual" with several unique formations and blitz packages, and researched Saints star Cam Jordan to understand Allen's scheme. From Weeks 7 through 12, Sweat recorded a sack in four of five games, including two in a 31–28 win over the Steelers to conclude the stretch; he also strip-sacked Steelers quarterback Mason Rudolph. He finished the season with a team-leading ten sacks, four more than the second most by Gervon Dexter.

On October 13, 2026, Sweat was suspended for two games for violating the NFL's performance-enhancing substance policy. Upon his reinstatement, he reunited with former Mississippi State teammate Jeffery Simmons, whom the Bears had traded for on October 29. Sweat's performance improved with Simmons alongside him as he recorded eight pressures across their first two games together, the same amount he had in the four games prior to the trade. In Week 11's win over the Saints, Sweat recorded his first career safety and the Bears' first since 2021.

== Career statistics ==
=== NFL ===
==== Regular season ====
Legend
**Bold**	Career high

Year	Team	Games		Tackles					Fumbles				Interceptions					
Year	Team	GP	GS	Cmb	Solo	Ast	Sck	TFL	FF	FR	Yds	TD	PD	Int	Yds	Avg	Lng	TD
2019	WAS	16	16	50	31	**19**	7.0	8	2	0	0	0	2	0	0	0.0	0	0
2020	WAS	16	16	45	28	17	9.0	12	2	0	0	0	**6**	**1**	**15**	**15.0**	**15**	**1**
2021	WAS	10	10	24	13	11	5.0	3	**3**	0	0	0	0	0	0	0.0	0	0
2022	WAS	17	17	46	27	**19**	8.0	**14**	0	0	0	0	2	0	0	0.0	0	0
2023	WAS	8	8	32	21	11	6.5	10	2	0	0	0	1	0	0	0.0	0	0
2023	CHI	9	9	25	17	8	6.0	4	1	0	0	0	3	0	0	0.0	0	0
2024	CHI	16	16	32	18	14	5.5	9	2	0	0	0	2	0	0	0.0	0	0
2025	CHI	17	17	53	36	17	10.0	13	**3**	**1**	0	0	5	0	0	0.0	0	0
2026	CHI	7	7	15	7	8	3.0	3	1	0	0	0	0	0	0	0.0	0	0
Career		116	116	322	198	124	60.0	76	16	1	0	0	21	1	15	15.0	15	1

==== Playoffs ====
Year	Team	Games		Tackles					Fumbles				Interceptions					
Year	Team	GP	GS	Cmb	Solo	Ast	Sck	TFL	FF	FR	Yds	TD	PD	Int	Yds	Avg	Lng	TD
2020	WAS	1	1	4	**2**	2	**1.0**	**2**	0	0	0	0	0	—	—	—	—	—
2025	CHI	2	2	**5**	**2**	**3**	**1.0**	1	**1**	0	0	0	0	—	—	—	—	—
Career		3	3	9	4	5	2.0	3	1	0	0	0	0	0	0	0.0	0	0

=== College ===
Season	Team	GP	Tackles					Fumbles			
Season	Team	GP	Solo	Ast	Cmb	TfL	Sck	FR	Yds	TD	FF
2014	Michigan State	1	2	2	4	0.5	1.0	1	0	0	0
2015	Michigan State	0	(redshirt) Redshirted								
2016	Copiah–Lincoln	9	32	7	39	—	5.0	1	0	0	2
2017	Mississippi State	13	21	27	48	15.5	10.5	1	0	0	0
2018	Mississippi State	13	27	26	53	14.5	12.0	0	0	0	1
Total		36	82	62	144	30.5	28.5	3	0	0	3

== Personal life ==
Sweat was raised by his grandparents as a child. Both his mother and older brother died in 2021, the latter being killed at the age of 27 in a shooting in Henrico County, Virginia. As a rookie, Sweat was featured in Old Spice television commercials.

In June 2021, Sweat expressed his disinterest in getting vaccinations against the COVID-19 virus and that he would forgo getting a COVID-19 vaccine.
