= 2020 Washington Football Team season =

89th season in franchise history

- Owner: Daniel Snyder
- General manager: Ron Rivera (de facto)
- President: Jason Wright
- Head coach: Ron Rivera
- Offensive coordinator: Scott Turner
- Defensive coordinator: Jack Del Rio
- Home stadium: FedExField

Results
- Record: 7–9
- Division place: 1st NFC East
- Playoffs: Lost Wild Card Playoffs (vs. Buccaneers) 23–31
- All-Pros: G Brandon Scherff (1st team)
- Pro Bowlers: G Brandon Scherff; DE Chase Young

Uniform
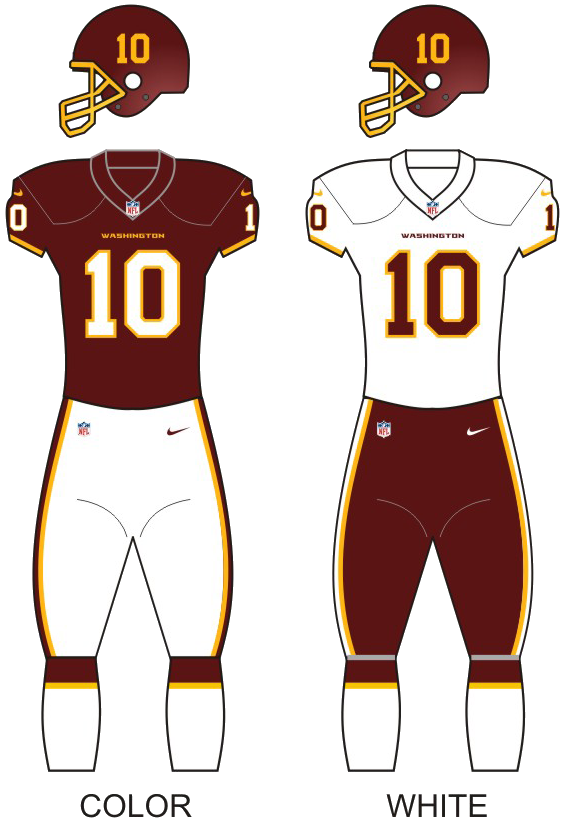

The 2020 season was the Washington Football Team's 89th in the National Football League (NFL) and their first under head coach Ron Rivera. The season also marked the first time since their inaugural season as the Braves in 1932 that the team was not known as the Redskins, as they retired the name and logo during the offseason in the wake of the George Floyd protests, and after decades of controversy. This was also the first season since 2009 without Pro Bowl offensive lineman Trent Williams, who was traded to the San Francisco 49ers on April 25, 2020. It was also the first season since 2008 without Bruce Allen, as he and several other front office members were fired at the end of the 2019 season.

The team improved upon its 3–13 record in 2019 by going 7–9 and winning the NFC East for the first time since 2015. In doing so they became only the third team in NFL history to win a division with a losing record in a full season after the 2010 Seattle Seahawks and 2014 Carolina Panthers, the latter of which Rivera also coached. It would be followed by the 2022 Tampa Bay Buccaneers and 2025 Carolina Panthers. They also became the first team in NFL history to make the playoffs after a 2–7 start. Their season would end with a 31–23 loss to the eventual Super Bowl LV champion Tampa Bay Buccaneers in the wild-card round. The season also marked the return of quarterback Alex Smith, who suffered a life-threatening leg injury late in the 2018 season and missed the entire 2019 season. Smith was named NFL Comeback Player of the Year, while defensive end Chase Young, selected second overall in the 2020 NFL draft, was named Defensive Rookie of the Year.

For the fourth time in five seasons, Washington played on Thanksgiving, playing the Dallas Cowboys for the third time in that span. Also notable was their scheduled absence from Monday Night Football for the first time since 1999, although the Week 13 game against the Pittsburgh Steelers was played on a Monday due to COVID-19-related schedule changes affecting the Steelers' previous week. Washington ended up winning that game to hand the 11–0 Steelers their first loss of the season.

Despite their below-average record, Washington's defense ranked among the best in the league. The defense ranked second in the league in total defense (304.6 yards per game), second in passing defense (191.8 yards per game), fourth in scoring defense (20.6 points per game), sixth in sacks (47), and seventh in takeaways (23, which included 16 interceptions and 7 fumble recoveries). This marked the first time since 2008 (when they were known as the Redskins) where the team finished top 10 in defense.

Washington would not make the postseason again until 2024, when they became known as the Commanders. However, as of 2025, this is the most recent time the franchise won a division title.

== Draft ==
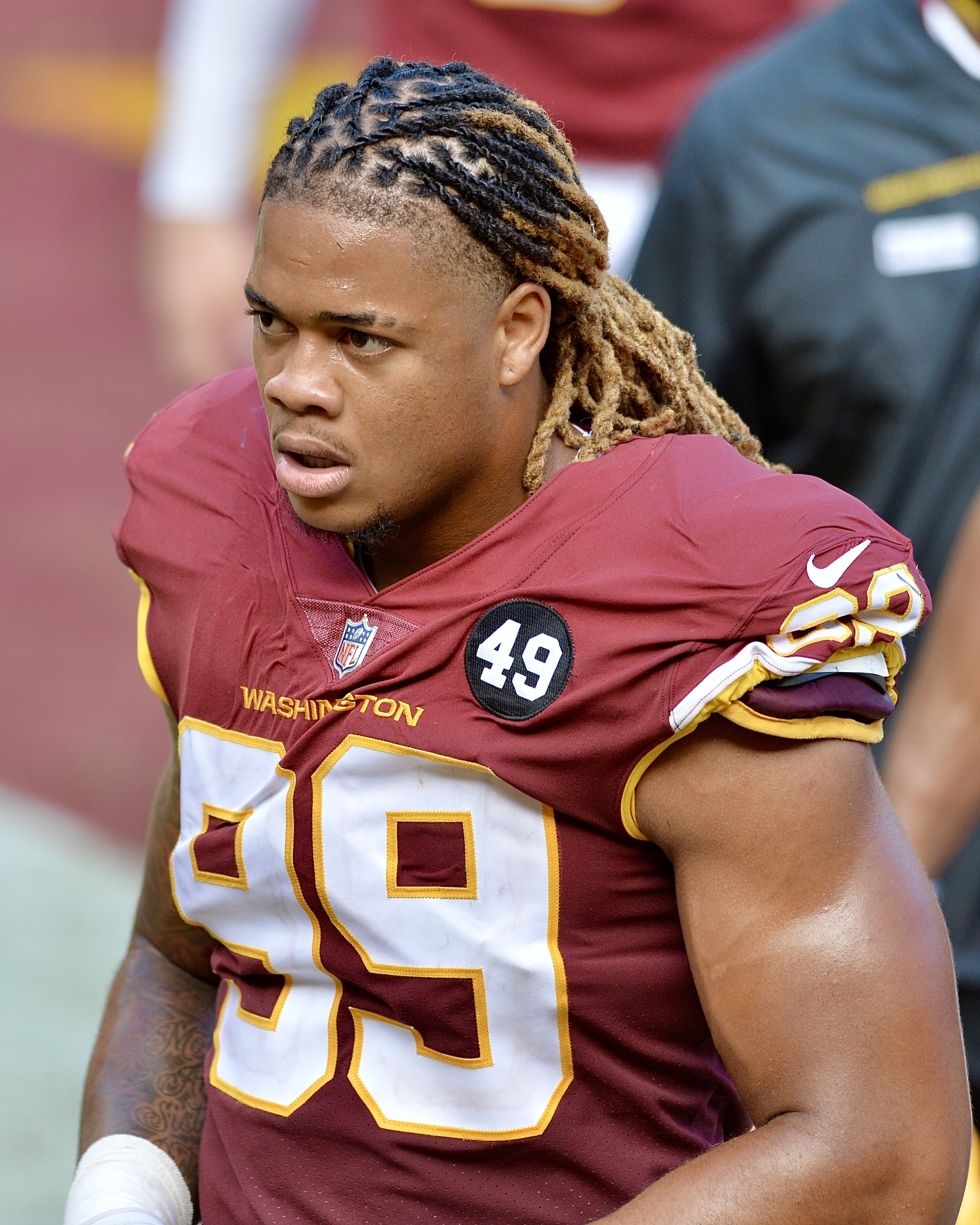
Defensive end Chase Young was selected second overall by the team and won NFL Defensive Rookie of the Year.

2020 NFL draft selections
Round	Pick	Player	Position	College
1	2	Chase Young	DE	Ohio State
3	66	Antonio Gibson	RB	Memphis
4	108	Saahdiq Charles	T	LSU
4	142	Antonio Gandy-Golden	WR	Liberty
5	156	Keith Ismael	C	San Diego State
5	162	Khaleke Hudson	LB	Michigan
7	216	Kamren Curl	SS	Arkansas
7	229	James Smith-Williams	DE	NC State

Notes

- Washington traded their second-round selection (No. 34 overall), along with their 2019 second-round selection to the Indianapolis Colts in exchange for the Colts' 2019 first-round selection.
- Washington traded their fifth-round selection to the Carolina Panthers in exchange for quarterback Kyle Allen.
- Washington traded cornerback Quinton Dunbar to the Seattle Seahawks in exchange for a fifth-round selection from Seattle.
- Washington traded their sixth-round selection to the Denver Broncos in exchange for quarterback Case Keenum and the Broncos' seventh-round selection.
- Washington traded offensive tackle Trent Williams to the San Francisco 49ers in exchange for the 49ers' fifth-round selection and a third-round selection in the 2021 draft.

== Staff ==
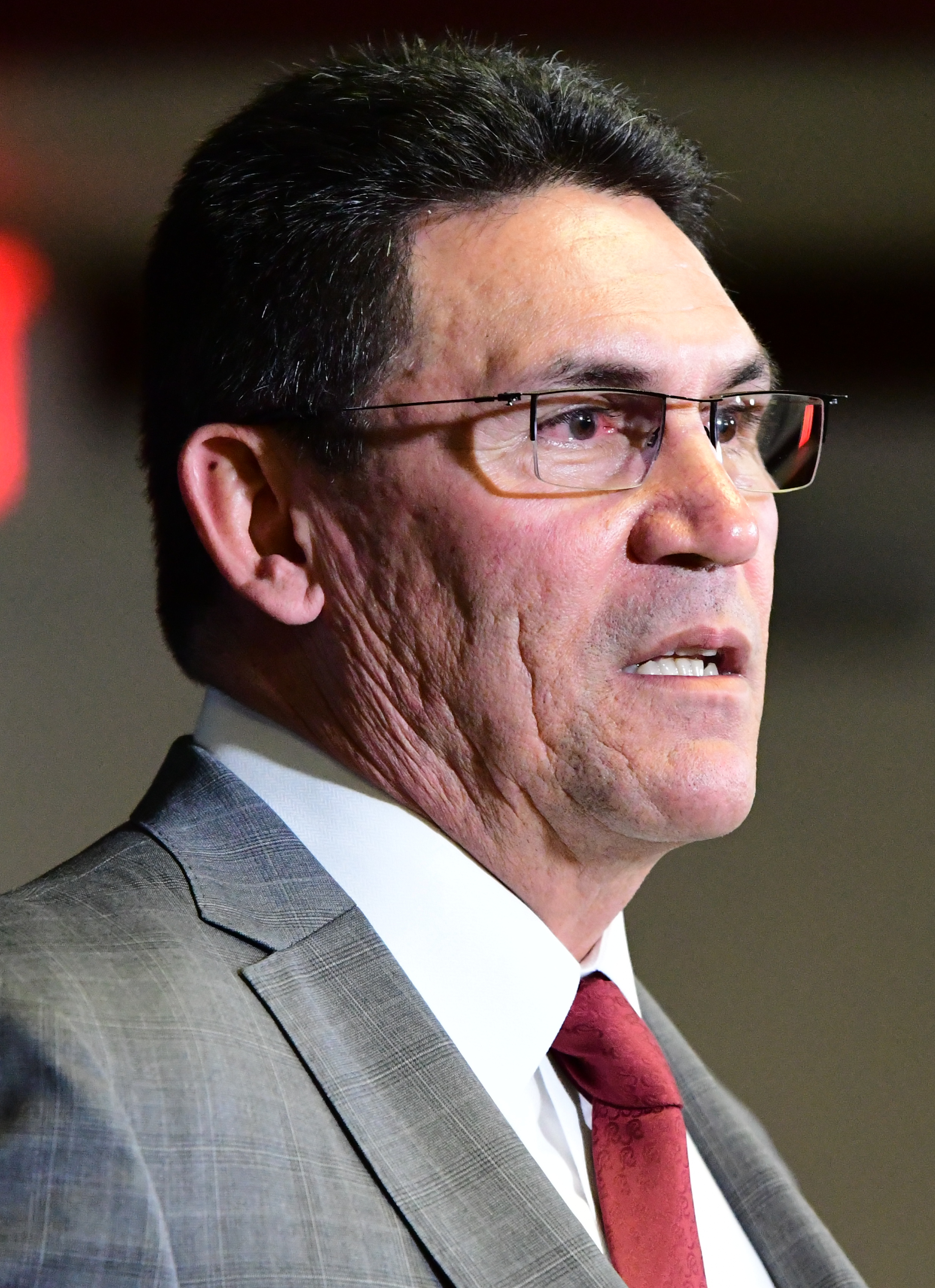
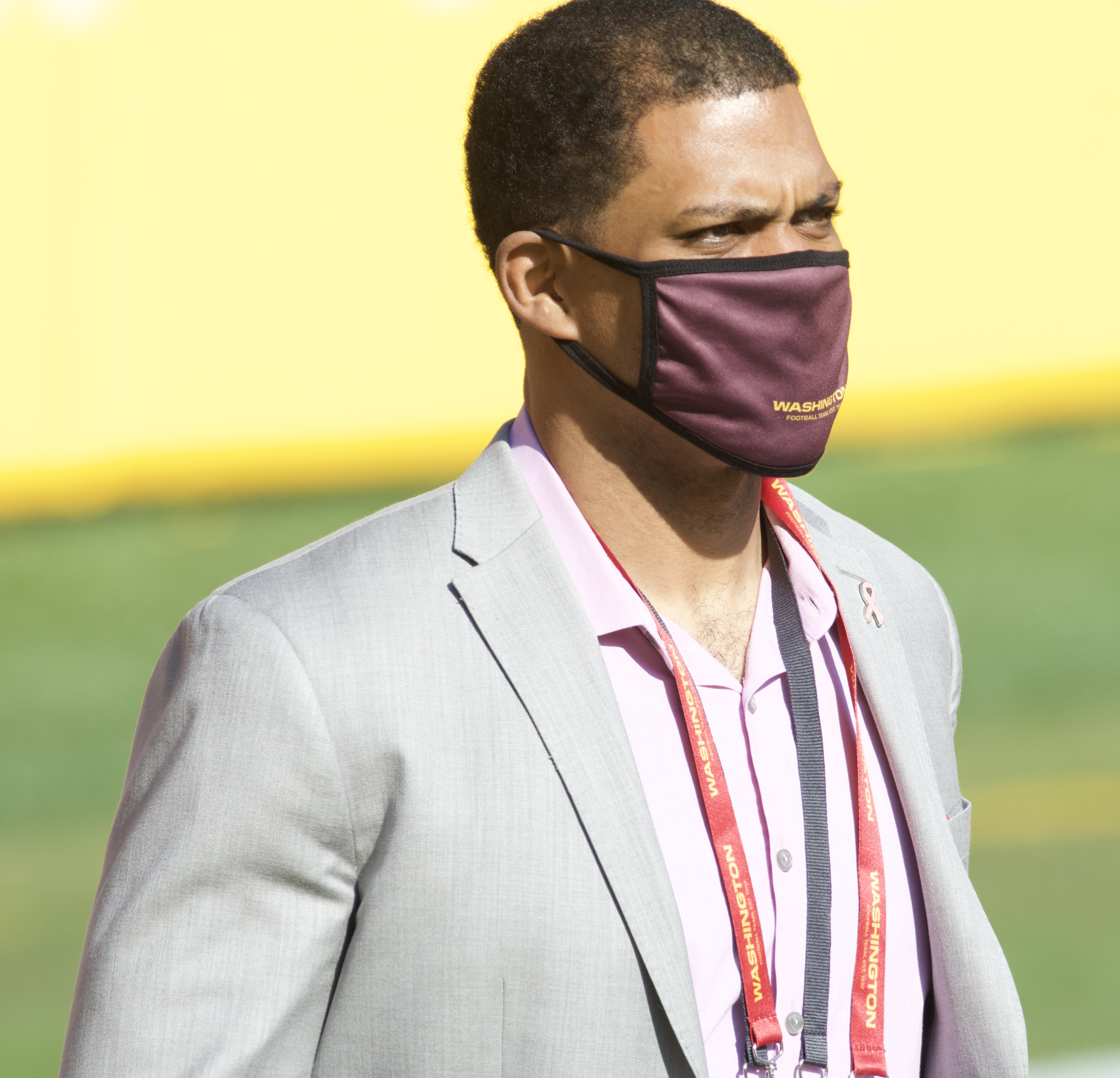
The season saw the hiring of head coach Ron Rivera (top) and team president Jason Wright (bottom)

2020 Washington Football Team staff
Front office: Owner – Daniel Snyder; President – Jason Wright; Vice president of player personnel – Kyle Smith; Director of pro personnel – Eric Stokes; Director of college personnel – Tim Gribble; Senior vice president of football administration – Rob Rogers; Senior vice president of player development – Doug Williams; Head coaches: Head coach – Ron Rivera; Offensive coaches: Offensive coordinator – Scott Turner; Quarterbacks – Ken Zampese; Running backs – Randy Jordan; Wide receivers – Jim Hostler; Assistant wide receivers – Drew Terrell; Tight ends – Pete Hoener; Offensive line – John Matsko; Assistant offensive line – Travelle Wharton; Offensive quality control – Luke Del Rio and Todd Storm	Defensive coaches: Defensive coordinator – Jack Del Rio; Defensive line – Sam Mills III; Assistant defensive line – Jeff Zgonina; Linebackers – Steve Russ; Defensive backs – Chris Harris; Assistant defensive backs – Brent Vieselmeyer and Richard Rodgers Sr.; Defensive quality control – Vincent Rivera; Special teams coaches: Special teams coordinator – Nate Kaczor; Assistant special teams – Ben Jacobs; Strength and conditioning: Head strength and conditioning – Chad Englehart; Strength and conditioning – Kavan Latham and Jake Sankal; Head athletic trainer – Ryan Vermillion

== Final roster ==
2020 Washington Football Team roster
Quarterbacks (QB): 4 Taylor Heinicke; 6 Steven Montez; 11 Alex Smith; Running backs (RB): 34 Peyton Barber; 24 Antonio Gibson; 41 J. D. McKissic; 35 Lamar Miller; Wide receivers (WR): 19 Robert Foster; 10 Antonio Gandy-Golden; 17 Terry McLaurin; 89 Cam Sims; 15 Steven Sims; 83 Isaiah Wright; Tight ends (TE): 85 Marcus Baugh; 87 Jeremy Sprinkle; 82 Logan Thomas	Offensive linemen (OL): 60 Keith Ismael C; 78 Cornelius Lucas T; 67 Wes Martin G; 76 Morgan Moses T; 73 Chase Roullier C; 72 David Sharpe T; 75 Brandon Scherff G; 71 Wes Schweitzer G; 66 David Steinmetz T; Defensive linemen (DL): 93 Jonathan Allen DT; 91 Ryan Kerrigan DE; 94 Daron Payne DT; 97 Tim Settle DT; 96 James Smith-Williams DT; 90 Montez Sweat DE; 95 Casey Toohill DE; 99 Chase Young DE	Linebackers (LB): 53 Jon Bostic MLB; 58 Thomas Davis Sr. OLB; 55 Cole Holcomb OLB; 47 Khaleke Hudson OLB; 48 Mychal Kendricks MLB; 59 Jordan Kunaszyk OLB; 50 Jared Norris MLB; 54 Kevin Pierre-Louis OLB; Defensive backs (DB): 30 Troy Apke FS; 31 Kamren Curl SS; 23 Ronald Darby CB; 29 Kendall Fuller CB; 32 Danny Johnson CB; 46 Cole Luke SS; 25 Fabian Moreau CB; 20 Jimmy Moreland CB; 39 Jeremy Reaves FS; Special teams (ST): 3 Dustin Hopkins K; 57 Nick Sundberg LS; 5 Tress Way P	Practice squad: 64 David Bada DT (IPP); 38 Jordan Brown CB; 12 Tony Brown WR; 45 Dylan Cantrell TE; 36 Aaron Colvin CB; 14 Trevor Davis WR; 80 Dontrelle Inman WR; 79 Jalen Jelks DE; 92 Devaroe Lawrence DT; 38 Javon Leake RB; 69 Rick Leonard T; 61 Timon Parris T; 45 Justin Phillips LB; 86 Tyrone Swoopes TE; 2 Kaare Vedvik K/P; 38 Jonathan Williams RB; Reserve: 8 Kyle Allen QB (IR); 52 Ryan Anderson DE (IR); 96 Caleb Brantley DT (Opt-out); 77 Saahdiq Charles G (IR); 74 Geron Christian T (IR); 26 Landon Collins SS (IR); 51 Shaun Dion Hamilton MLB (IR); 22 Deshazor Everett FS (IR); 56 Reuben Foster LB (IR); 80 Emanuel Hall WR (NF-Inj.); 13 Kelvin Harmon WR (NF-Inj.); 40 Josh Harvey-Clemons OLB (Opt-out); 88 Temarrick Hemingway TE (IR); 98 Matt Ioannidis DT (IR); 35 Bryce Love RB (IR); 46 Thaddeus Moss TE (IR); 37 Greg Stroman CB (IR); Rookies in italics 53 active, 17 reserve, 15 practice squad (1 exempt)

== Schedule ==
=== Preseason ===
The team's preseason schedule was announced on May 7, but was later cancelled due to the COVID-19 pandemic.

Week	Date	Opponent	Venue	Result
1	August 15	Tennessee Titans	FedExField	**Canceled due to the COVID-19 pandemic**
2	August 24	at Indianapolis Colts	Lucas Oil Stadium	**Canceled due to the COVID-19 pandemic**
3	August 29	at Jacksonville Jaguars	TIAA Bank Field	**Canceled due to the COVID-19 pandemic**
4	September 3	Baltimore Ravens	FedExField	**Canceled due to the COVID-19 pandemic**

=== Regular season ===
Washington's 2020 schedule was announced on May 7.

Week	Date	Opponent	Result	Record	Venue	Recap
1	September 13	**Philadelphia Eagles**	**W** 27–17	1–0	FedExField	Recap
2	September 20	at Arizona Cardinals	**L** 15–30	1–1	State Farm Stadium	Recap
3	September 27	at Cleveland Browns	**L** 20–34	1–2	FirstEnergy Stadium	Recap
4	October 4	Baltimore Ravens	**L** 17–31	1–3	FedExField	Recap
5	October 11	Los Angeles Rams	**L** 10–30	1–4	FedExField	Recap
6	October 18	at **New York Giants**	**L** 19–20	1–5	MetLife Stadium	Recap
7	October 25	**Dallas Cowboys**	**W** 25–3	2–5	FedExField	Recap
8	Bye					
9	November 8	**New York Giants**	**L** 20–23	2–6	FedExField	Recap
10	November 15	at Detroit Lions	**L** 27–30	2–7	Ford Field	Recap
11	November 22	Cincinnati Bengals	**W** 20–9	3–7	FedExField	Recap
12	November 26	at **Dallas Cowboys**	**W** 41–16	4–7	AT&T Stadium	Recap
13	December 7 (Note: Washington's Week 13 game in Pittsburgh was originally scheduled for December 6 at 1:00 p.m. EST, before being moved to December 7 due to a COVID-19 outbreak within the Baltimore Ravens' organization that forced the Ravens' Week 12 game at the Steelers, originally scheduled to be Thanksgiving, to be pushed back to December 1, 2020.)	at Pittsburgh Steelers	**W** 23–17	5–7	Heinz Field	Recap
14	December 13	at San Francisco 49ers	**W** 23–15	6–7	State Farm Stadium (Note: Due to a ban on all contact sports imposed by Santa Clara County in California as a result of rising COVID-19 cases, the 49ers hosted all of their remaining home games at State Farm Stadium in Arizona.)	Recap
15	December 20	Seattle Seahawks	**L** 15–20	6–8	FedExField	Recap
16	December 27	Carolina Panthers	**L** 13–20	6–9	FedExField	Recap
17	January 3	at **Philadelphia Eagles**	**W** 20–14	7–9	Lincoln Financial Field	Recap

Note: Intra-division opponents are in bold text.

==== Week 1: vs. Philadelphia Eagles ====
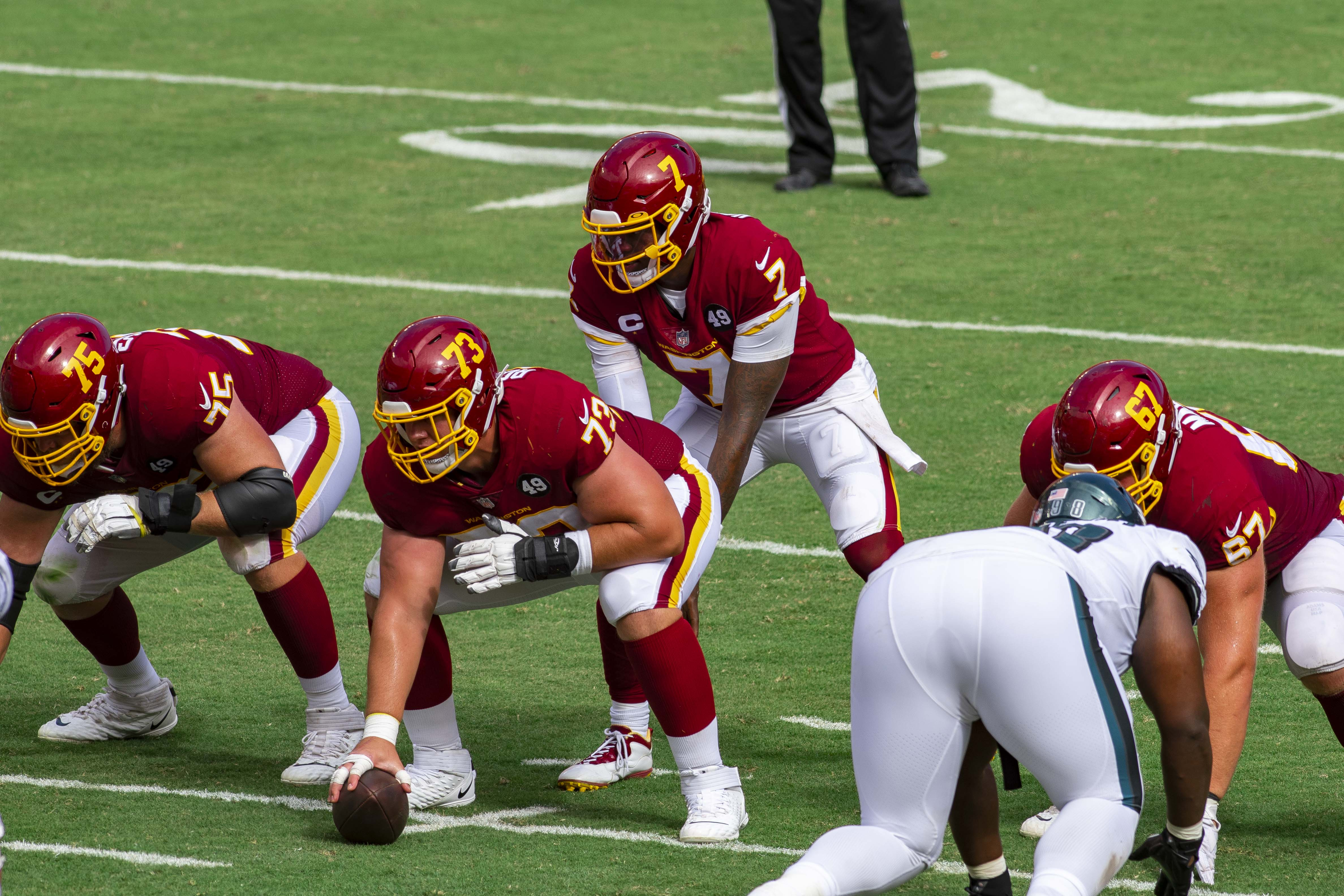
Washington vs. the Philadelphia Eagles

Week 1: Philadelphia Eagles at Washington Football Team – Game summary

Quarter	1	2	3	4	Total
Eagles	10	7	0	0	**17**
**Washington**	0	7	7	13	**27**

at FedExField, Landover, Maryland

- Date: September 13
- Game time: 1:00 p.m. EDT
- Game weather: Cloudy, 76 °F (24 °C)
- Game attendance: 0
- Referee: Brad Rogers
- TV announcers (Fox): Kevin Burkhardt, Daryl Johnston and Pam Oliver
- Recap, Game Book

Game information

**First quarter**

- PHI – Zach Ertz 5-yard pass from Carson Wentz (Jake Elliott kick), 11:14. Eagles 7–0. **Drive: 6 plays, 62 yards, 2:27.**
- PHI – Jake Elliott 38-yard field goal, 2:13. Eagles 10–0. **Drive: 11 plays, 76 yards, 6:45.**

**Second quarter**

- PHI – Dallas Goedert 34-yard pass from Carson Wentz (Jake Elliott kick), 6:54. Eagles 17–0. **Drive: 6 plays, 62 yards, 2:30.**
- WAS – Logan Thomas 6-yard pass from Dwayne Haskins (Dustin Hopkins kick), 0:40. Eagles 17–7. **Drive: 5 plays, 45 yards, 0:57.**

**Third quarter**

- WAS – Peyton Barber 1-yard run (Dustin Hopkins kick), 9:25. Eagles 17–14. **Drive: 5 plays, 20 yards, 2:19.**

**Fourth quarter**

- WAS – Dustin Hopkins 38-yard field goal, 14:15. Tied 17–17. **Drive: 5 plays, 26 yards, 1:58.**
- WAS – Peyton Barber 3-yard run (Dustin Hopkins kick), 6:13. Football Team 24–17. **Drive: 13 plays, 48 yards, 6:14.**
- WAS – Dustin Hopkins 40-yard field goal, 3:25. Football Team 27–17. **Drive: 5 plays, 20 yards, 1:06.**

**Top passers**

- PHI – Carson Wentz – 24/42, 270 yards, 2 TD, 2 INT
- WAS – Dwayne Haskins – 17/31, 178 yards, TD

**Top rushers**

- PHI – Boston Scott – 9 rushes, 35 yards
- WAS – Antonio Gibson – 9 rushes, 36 yards

**Top receivers**

- PHI – Dallas Goedert – 8 receptions, 101 yards, TD
- WAS – Terry McLaurin – 5 receptions, 61 yards

In their first game as the Washington Football Team, they fell behind 17–0 to the Eagles. Despite the deficit, Washington shut out the Eagles in the second half by accumulating 8 sacks on defense and scoring 27 unanswered points for a 27–17 victory. This was Washington's first victory over the Eagles since Week 14 of the 2016 season, snapping a six-game losing streak against Philadelphia. The win was also the largest comeback against the Eagles in franchise history. With the win, Washington improved to 1–0 for the first time since 2018 (the first time winning a home opener since 2014). Washington also snapped a ten-game division losing streak dating back to 2018.

==== Week 2: at Arizona Cardinals ====
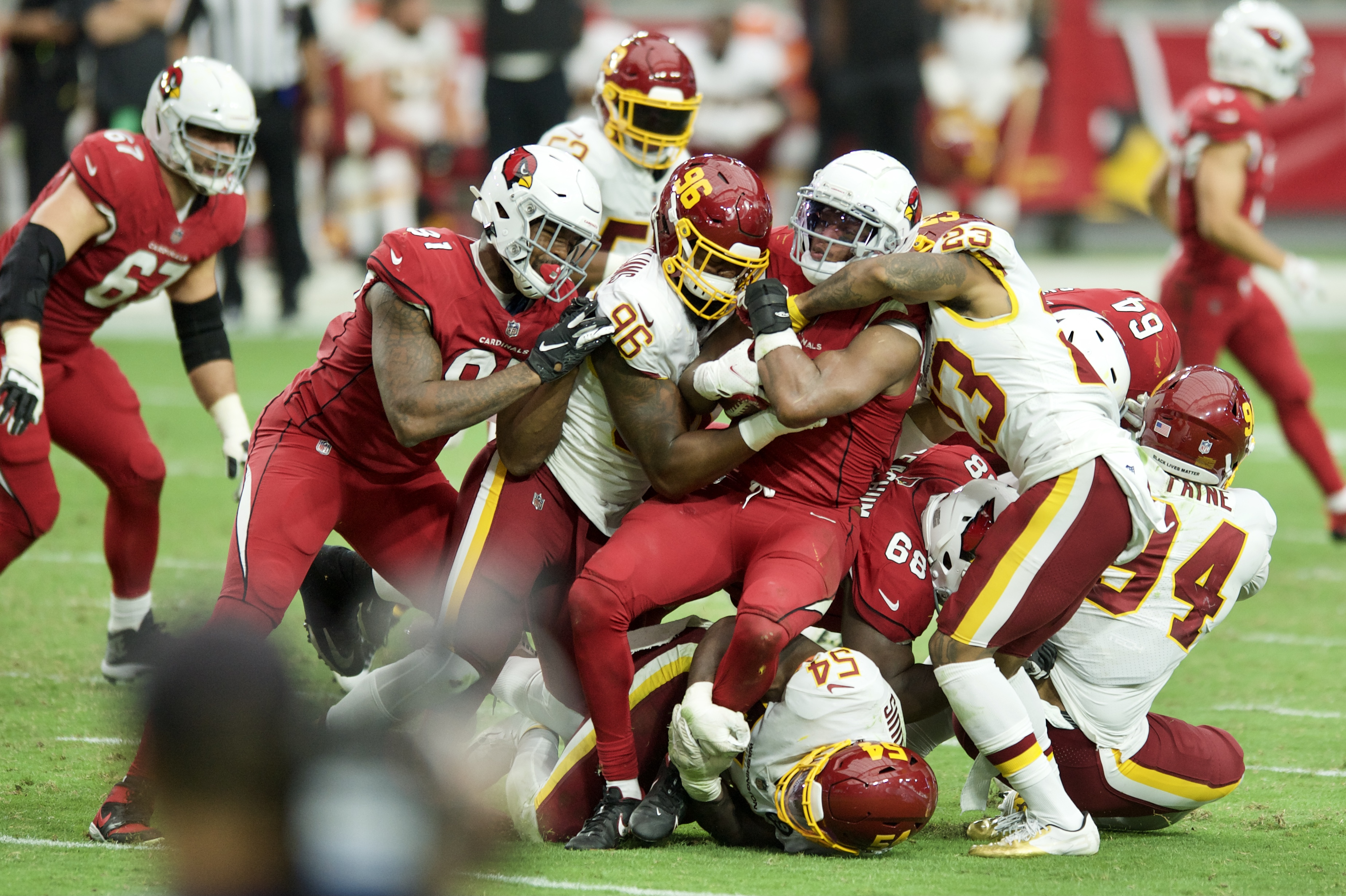
Washington vs. the Arizona Cardinals

Week 2: Washington Football Team at Arizona Cardinals – Game summary

Quarter	1	2	3	4	Total
Washington	0	0	3	12	**15**
**Cardinals**	14	6	0	10	**30**

at State Farm Stadium, Glendale, Arizona

- Date: September 20
- Game time: 4:05 p.m. EDT/1:05 p.m. MST
- Game weather: None (retractable roof closed)
- Game attendance: 0
- Referee: Land Clark
- TV announcers (Fox): Dick Stockton, Brady Quinn and Sara Walsh
- Recap, Game Book

Game information

**First quarter**

- ARI – DeAndre Hopkins 4-yard pass from Kyler Murray (Zane Gonzalez kick), 9:09. Cardinals 7–0. **Drive: 10 plays, 48 yards, 4:22.**
- ARI – Kyler Murray 14-yard run (Zane Gonzalez kick), 0:00. Cardinals 14–0. **Drive: 6 plays, 20 yards, 2:44.**

**Second quarter**

- ARI – Zane Gonzalez 49-yard field goal, 11:29. Cardinals 17–0. **Drive: 5 plays, 46 yards, 1:47.**
- ARI – Zane Gonzalez 33-yard field goal, 1:49. Cardinals 20–0. **Drive: 10 plays, 75 yards, 4:03.**

**Third quarter**

- WAS – Dustin Hopkins 24-yard field goal, 3:14. Cardinals 20–3. **Drive: 10 plays, 51 yards, 4:55.**

**Fourth quarter**

- ARI – Kyler Murray 21-yard run (Zane Gonzalez kick), 14:17. Cardinals 27–3. **Drive: 12 plays, 75 yards, 3:57.**
- WAS – Terry McLaurin 24-yard pass from Dwayne Haskins (run failed), 12:20. Cardinals 27–9. **Drive: 5 plays, 75 yards, 1:57.**
- WAS – Antonio Gibson 11-yard run (pass failed), 6:38. Cardinals 27–15. **Drive: 9 plays, 78 yards, 2:55.**
- ARI – Zane Gonzalez 28-yard field goal, 0:26. Cardinals 30–15. **Drive: 11 plays, 74 yards, 6:12.**

**Top passers**

- WAS – Dwayne Haskins – 19/33, 223 yards, TD
- ARI – Kyler Murray – 26/38, 286 yards, TD, INT

**Top rushers**

- WAS – Antonio Gibson – 13 rushes, 55 yards, TD
- ARI – Kenyan Drake – 20 rushes, 86 yards

**Top receivers**

- WAS – Terry McLaurin – 7 receptions, 125 yards, TD
- ARI – DeAndre Hopkins – 8 receptions, 68 yards, TD

Washington was overmatched by Arizona quarterback Kyler Murray, who had two rushing touchdowns, and could not overcome a 20–0 halftime deficit.

==== Week 3: at Cleveland Browns ====
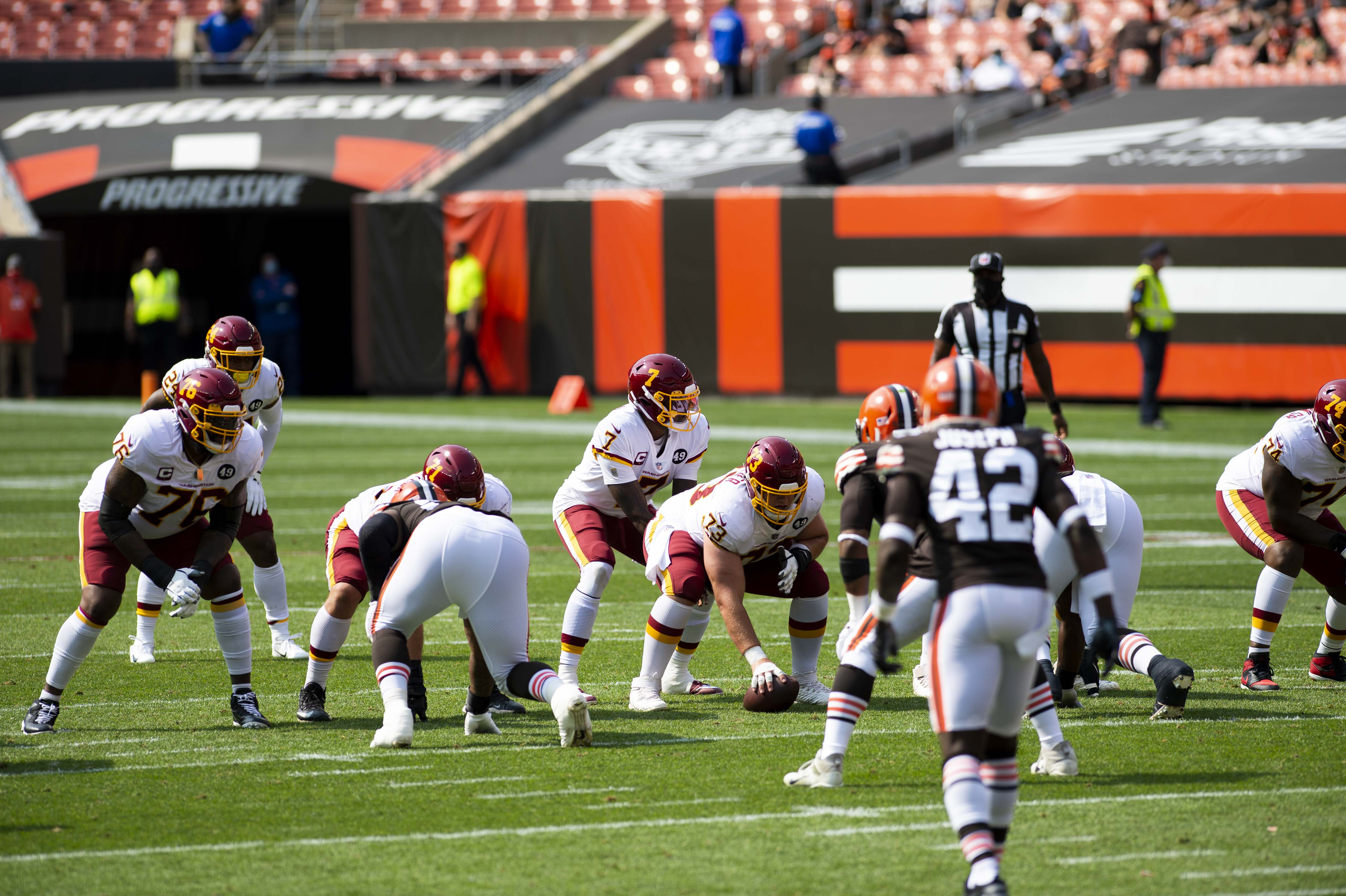
Washington vs. the Cleveland Browns

Week 3: Washington Football Team at Cleveland Browns – Game summary

Quarter	1	2	3	4	Total
Washington	7	0	13	0	**20**
**Browns**	0	17	0	17	**34**

at FirstEnergy Stadium, Cleveland, Ohio

- Date: September 27
- Game time: 1:00 p.m. EDT
- Game weather: Sunny, 73 °F (23 °C)
- Game attendance: 6,000
- Referee: Shawn Hochuli
- TV announcers (Fox): Kevin Kugler, Chris Spielman and Laura Okmin
- Recap, Game Book

Game information

**First quarter**

- WAS – Dontrelle Inman 17-yard pass from Dwayne Haskins (Dustin Hopkins kick), 1:44. Football Team 7–0. **Drive: 8 plays, 75 yards, 3:24.**

**Second quarter**

- CLE – Cody Parkey 42-yard field goal, 10:46. Football Team 7–3. **Drive: 13 plays, 42 yards, 5:58**
- CLE – Nick Chubb 16-yard run (Cody Parkey kick), 5:58. Browns 10–7. **Drive: 3 plays, 28 yards, 1:26**
- CLE – Kareem Hunt 9-yard pass from Baker Mayfield (Cody Parkey kick), 0:32. Browns 17–7. **Drive: 3 plays, 24 yards, 1:23**

**Third quarter**

- WAS – Antonio Gibson 2-yard run (kick failed), 9:05. Browns 17–13. **Drive: 6 plays, 49 yards, 2:22.**
- WAS – Dontrelle Inman 11-yard pass from Dwayne Haskins (Dustin Hopkins kick), 2:20. Football Team 20–17. **Drive: 12 plays, 54 yards, 5:08.**

**Fourth quarter**

- CLE – Harrison Bryant 3-yard pass from Baker Mayfield (Cody Parkey kick), 11:14. Browns 24–20. **Drive: 11 plays, 75 yards, 6:06**
- CLE – Nick Chubb 20-yard run (Cody Parkey kick), 8:40. Browns 31–20. **Drive: 3 plays, 35 yards, 1:23**
- CLE – Cody Parkey 30-yard field goal, 1:10. Browns 34–20. **Drive: 10 plays, 29 yards, 5:20**

**Top passers**

- WAS – Dwayne Haskins – 21/37, 224 yards, 2 TD, 3 INT
- CLE – Baker Mayfield – 16/23, 156 yards, 2 TD

**Top rushers**

- WAS – Antonio Gibson – 9 rushes, 49 yards, TD
- CLE – Nick Chubb – 19 rushes, 108 yards, 2 TD

**Top receivers**

- WAS – Terry McLaurin – 4 receptions, 83 yards
- CLE – Odell Beckham Jr. – 4 receptions, 59 yards

Haskins threw for a career-high three interceptions and lost one fumble. With the loss, the all-time regular season record for the franchise fell to 604–605–28, making it the first time since 1975 that the record fell below a .500 winning percentage.

==== Week 4: vs. Baltimore Ravens ====
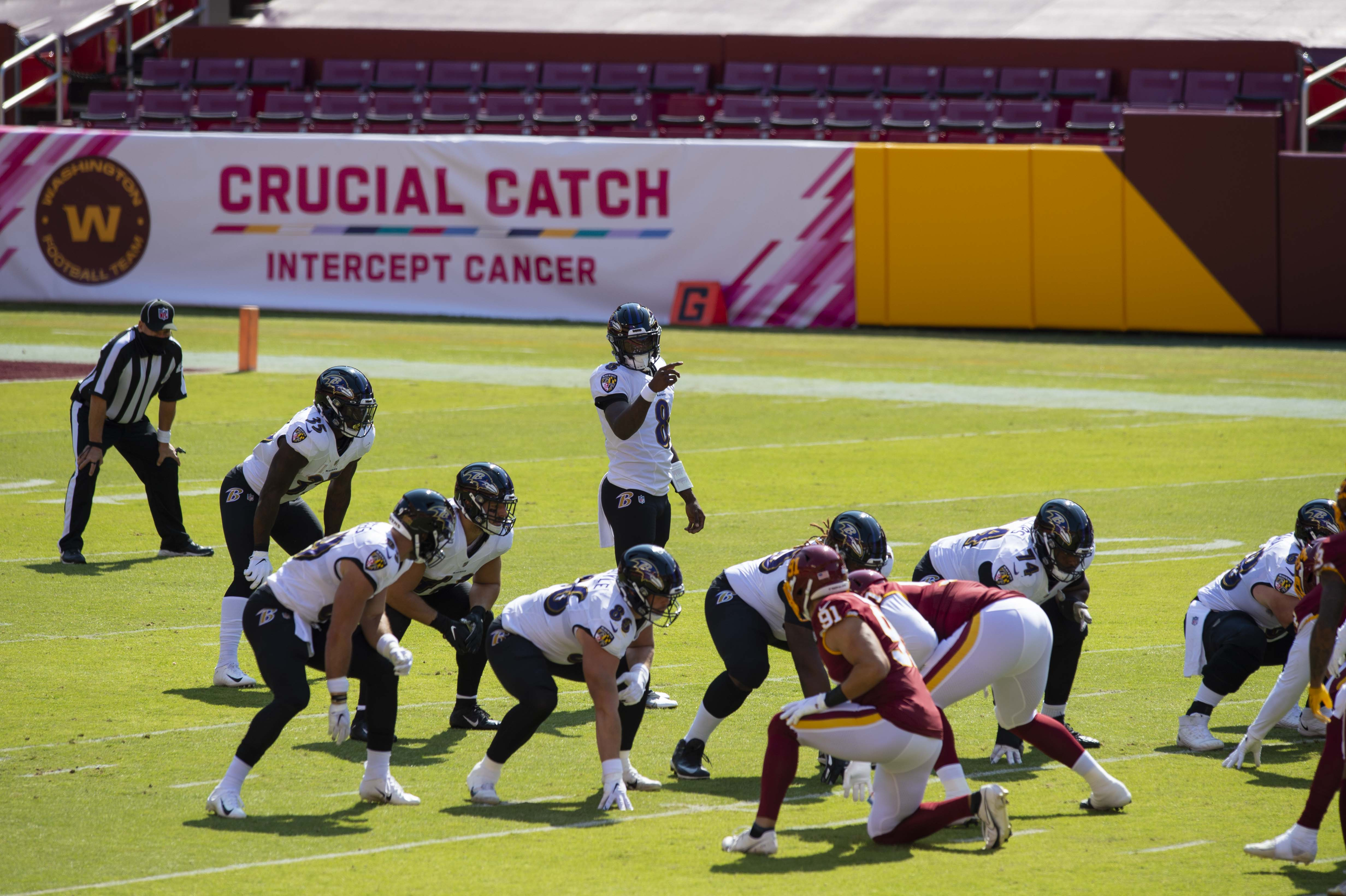
Washington vs. the Baltimore Ravens

Week 4: Baltimore Ravens at Washington Football Team – Game summary

Quarter	1	2	3	4	Total
**Ravens**	7	14	7	3	**31**
Washington	0	10	0	7	**17**

at FedExField, Landover, Maryland

- Date: October 4
- Game time: 1:00 p.m. EDT
- Game weather: Sunny, 65 °F (18 °C)
- Game attendance: 0
- Referee: Adrian Hill
- TV announcers (CBS): Andrew Catalon, James Lofton and A. J. Ross
- Recap, Game Book

Game information

**First quarter**

- BAL – Mark Ingram II 1-yard run (Justin Tucker kick), 2:09. Ravens 7–0. **Drive: 2 plays, 34 yards, 0:42.**

**Second quarter**

- BAL – Lamar Jackson 50-yard run (Justin Tucker kick), 9:56. Ravens 14–0. **Drive: 3 plays, 56 yards, 1:30.**
- WAS – Antonio Gibson 2-yard run (Dustin Hopkins kick), 4:41. Ravens 14–7. **Drive: 10 plays, 75 yards, 5:15.**
- BAL – Mark Andrews 25-yard pass from Lamar Jackson (Justin Tucker kick), 1:49. Ravens 21–7. **Drive: 8 plays, 75 yards, 2:52.**
- WAS – Dustin Hopkins 43-yard field goal, 0:00. Ravens 21–10. **Drive: 3 plays, 12 yards, 0:30.**

**Third quarter**

- BAL – Mark Andrews 22-yard pass from Lamar Jackson (Justin Tucker kick), 8:42. Ravens 28–10. **Drive: 10 plays, 75 yards, 6:18.**

**Fourth quarter**

- BAL – Justin Tucker 46-yard field goal, 5:16. Ravens 31–10. **Drive: 10 plays, 64 yards, 6:19.**
- WAS – Dwayne Haskins 1-yard run (Dustin Hopkins kick), 2:05. Ravens 31–17. **Drive: 4 plays, 42 yards, 1:24.**

**Top passers**

- BAL – Lamar Jackson – 14/21, 193 yards, 2 TD, INT
- WAS – Dwayne Haskins – 32/45, 314 yards

**Top rushers**

- BAL – Lamar Jackson – 7 rushes, 53 yards, TD
- WAS – Antonio Gibson – 13 rushes, 46 yards, TD

**Top receivers**

- BAL – Marquise Brown – 4 receptions, 86 yards
- WAS – Terry McLaurin – 10 receptions, 118 yards

Dwayne Haskins set a career high in passing yards but was benched in favor of Kyle Allen the following week.

==== Week 5: vs. Los Angeles Rams ====
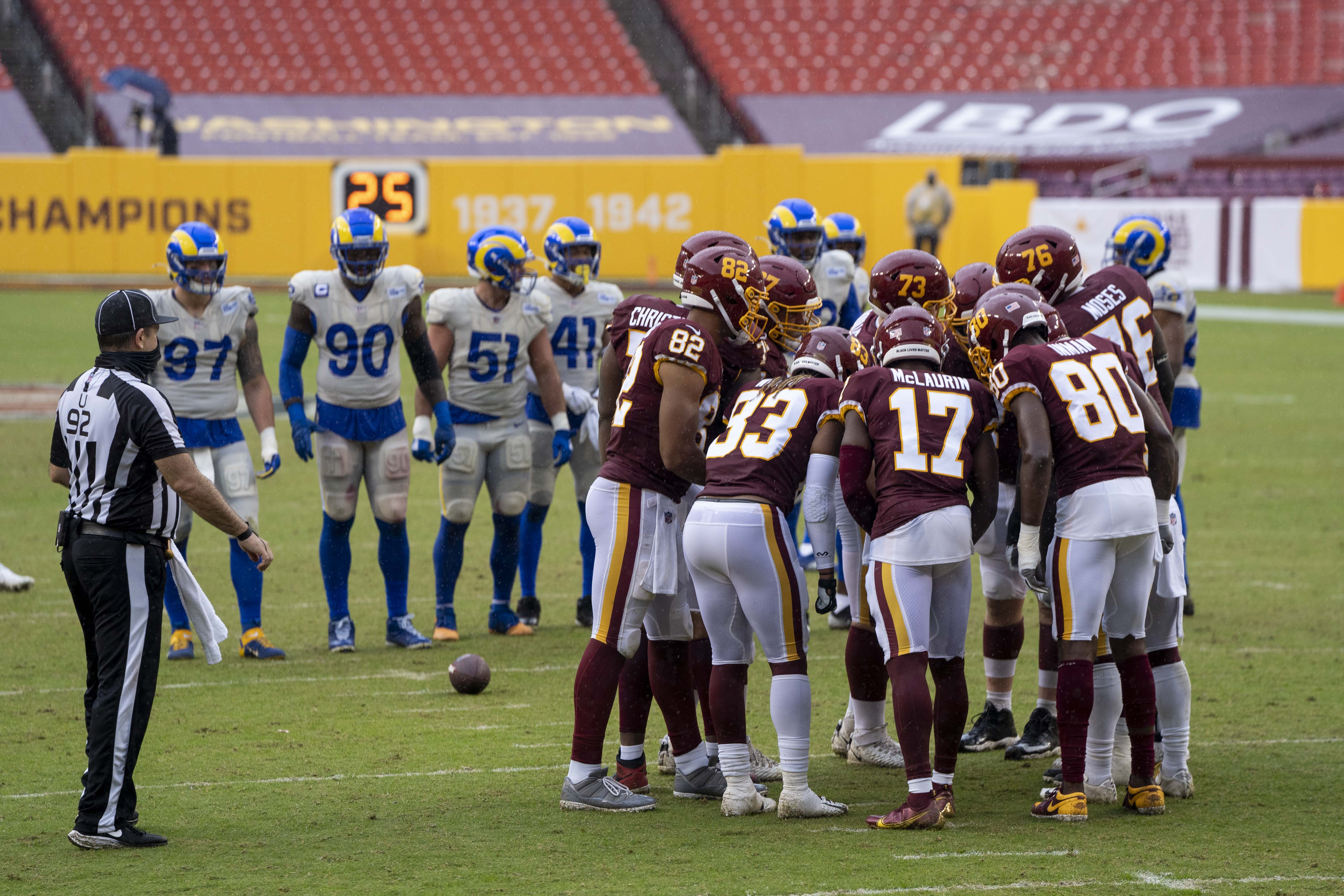
Washington vs. the Los Angeles Rams

Week 5: Los Angeles Rams at Washington Football Team – Game summary

Quarter	1	2	3	4	Total
**Rams**	6	14	3	7	**30**
Washington	7	3	0	0	**10**

at FedExField, Landover, Maryland

- Date: October 11
- Game time: 1:00 p.m. EDT
- Game weather: Cloudy, 69 °F (21 °C)
- Game attendance: 0
- Referee: Shawn Smith
- TV announcers (Fox): Brandon Gaudin, Daryl Johnston and Pam Oliver
- Recap, Game Book

Game information

**First quarter**

- LAR – Darrell Henderson 1-yard run (kick failed), 7:29. Rams 6–0. **Drive: 10 plays, 76 yards, 6:03.**
- WAS – Kyle Allen 7-yard run (Dustin Hopkins kick), 1:34. Football Team 7–6. **Drive: 10 plays, 73 yards, 5:55.**

**Second quarter**

- LAR – Robert Woods 56-yard pass from Jared Goff (Sam Sloman kick), 14:52. Rams 13–7. **Drive: 4 plays, 75 yards, 1:42.**
- LAR – Jared Goff 2-yard run (Sam Sloman kick), 7:32. Rams 20–7. **Drive: 9 plays, 83 yards, 4:40.**
- WAS – Dustin Hopkins 48-yard field goal, 0:00. Rams 20–10. **Drive: 5 plays, 20 yards, 0:49.**

**Third quarter**

- LAR – Sam Sloman 28-yard field goal, 7:04. Rams 23–10. **Drive: 10 plays, 70 yards, 3:51.**

**Fourth quarter**

- LAR – Darrell Henderson 11-yard pass from Jared Goff (Sam Sloman kick), 6:37. Rams 30–10. **Drive: 5 plays, 51 yards, 2:54.**

**Top passers**

- LAR – Jared Goff – 21/30, 309 yards, 2 TD, INT
- WAS – Kyle Allen – 9/13, 74 yards

**Top rushers**

- LAR – Cam Akers – 9 rushes, 61 yards
- WAS – Antonio Gibson – 11 rushes, 27 yards

**Top receivers**

- LAR – Gerald Everett – 4 receptions, 90 yards
- WAS – J. D. McKissic – 6 receptions, 46 yards

In the second quarter Kyle Allen left the game with what was ruled as an arm injury, leaving Alex Smith to play the remainder of the game. This marked Smith's first NFL game appearance since suffering a severe leg fracture in 2018. Washington's offense was again hampered by quarterback play as they lost 30–10. Their 108 total yards of offense was the fewest by any team in any game all season.

==== Week 6: at New York Giants ====
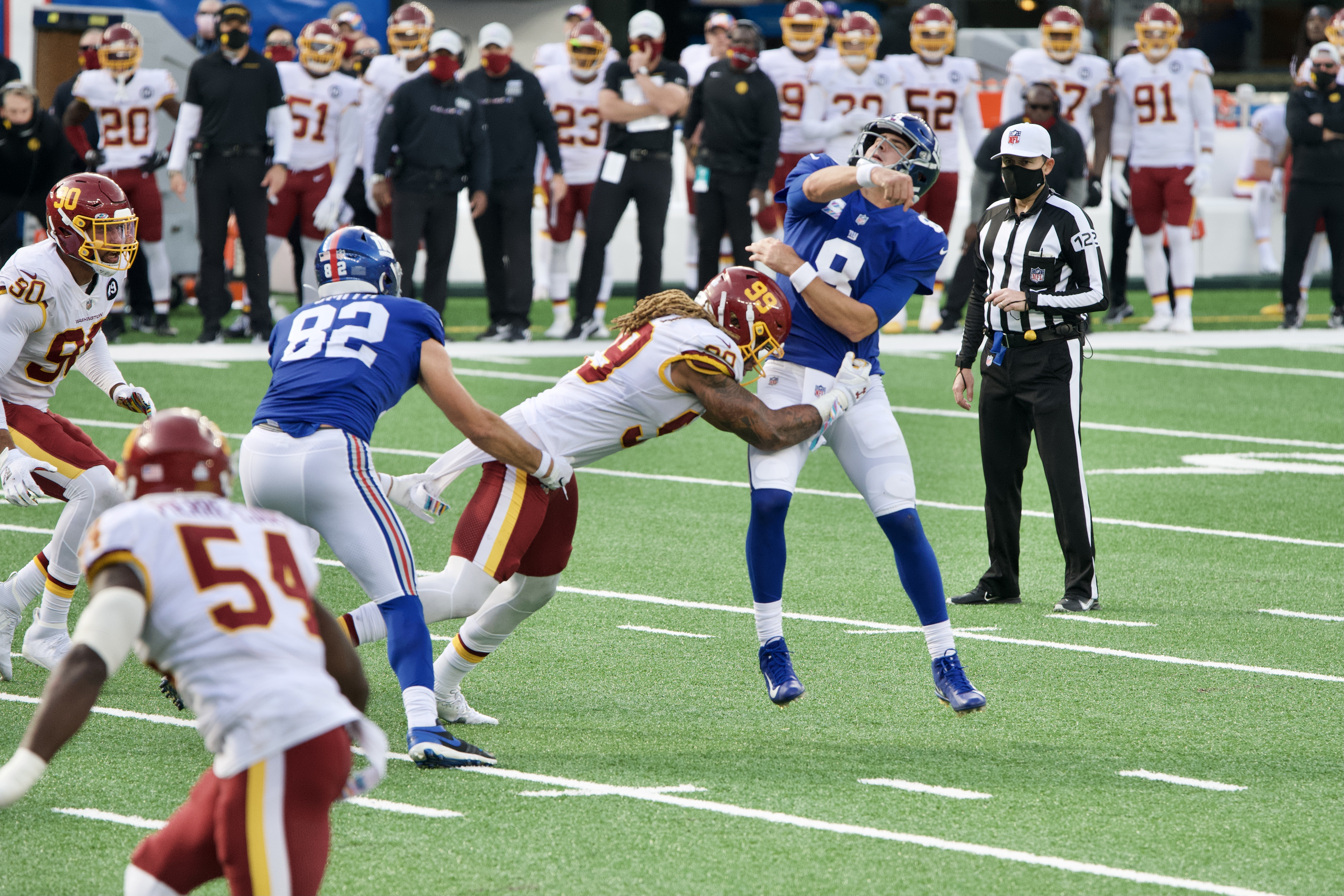
Washington vs. the New York Giants

Week 6: Washington Football Team at New York Giants – Game summary

Quarter	1	2	3	4	Total
Washington	0	10	0	9	**19**
**Giants**	10	3	0	7	**20**

at MetLife Stadium, East Rutherford, New Jersey

- Date: October 18
- Game time: 1:00 p.m. EDT
- Game weather: Partly cloudy, 62 °F (17 °C)
- Game attendance: 0
- Referee: Brad Allen
- TV announcers (Fox): Adam Amin, Mark Schlereth and Lindsay Czarniak
- Recap, Game Book

Game information

**First quarter**

- NYG – Graham Gano 33-yard field goal, 3:23. Giants 3–0. **Drive: 9 plays, 48 yards, 5:31.**
- NYG – Darius Slayton 23-yard pass from Daniel Jones (Graham Gano kick), 1:36. Giants 10–0. **Drive: 3 plays, 27 yards, 0:55.**

**Second quarter**

- WAS – Dustin Hopkins 35-yard field goal, 10:50. Giants 10–3. **Drive: 11 plays, 70 yards, 5:46.**
- NYG – Graham Gano 20-yard field goal, 6:15. Giants 13–3. **Drive: 8 plays, 73 yards, 4:35.**
- WAS – Logan Thomas 5-yard pass from Kyle Allen (Dustin Hopkins kick), 0:13. Giants 13–10. **Drive: 13 plays, 70 yards, 6:02.**

**Third quarter**

- No scoring plays

**Fourth quarter**

- WAS – Dustin Hopkins 28-yard field goal, 8:56. Tied 13–13. **Drive: 14 plays, 70 yards, 6:55.**
- NYG – Tae Crowder 43-yard fumble return (Graham Gano kick), 3:29. Giants 20–13. **Drive: 7 plays, 22 yards, 3:28.**
- WAS – Cam Sims 22-yard pass from Kyle Allen (pass failed), 0:36. Giants 20–19. **Drive: 10 plays, 75 yards, 2:53.**

**Top passers**

- WAS – Kyle Allen – 31/42, 280 yards, 2 TD, INT
- NYG – Daniel Jones – 12/19, 112 yards, TD, INT

**Top rushers**

- WAS – J. D. McKissic – 8 rushes, 41 yards,
- NYG – Daniel Jones – 7 rushes, 74 yards

**Top receivers**

- WAS – Terry McLaurin – 7 receptions, 74 yards
- NYG – Darius Slayton – 2 receptions, 41 yards, TD

Giants linebacker Tae Crowder recovered a Kyle Allen fumble for the go-ahead score and Washington responded with a touchdown of their own with 36 seconds remaining. Coach Rivera opted to go for the game-winning two point conversion which fell incomplete. As a result, Washington lost their fifth straight game overall and their fourth consecutive against the Giants.

==== Week 7: vs. Dallas Cowboys ====
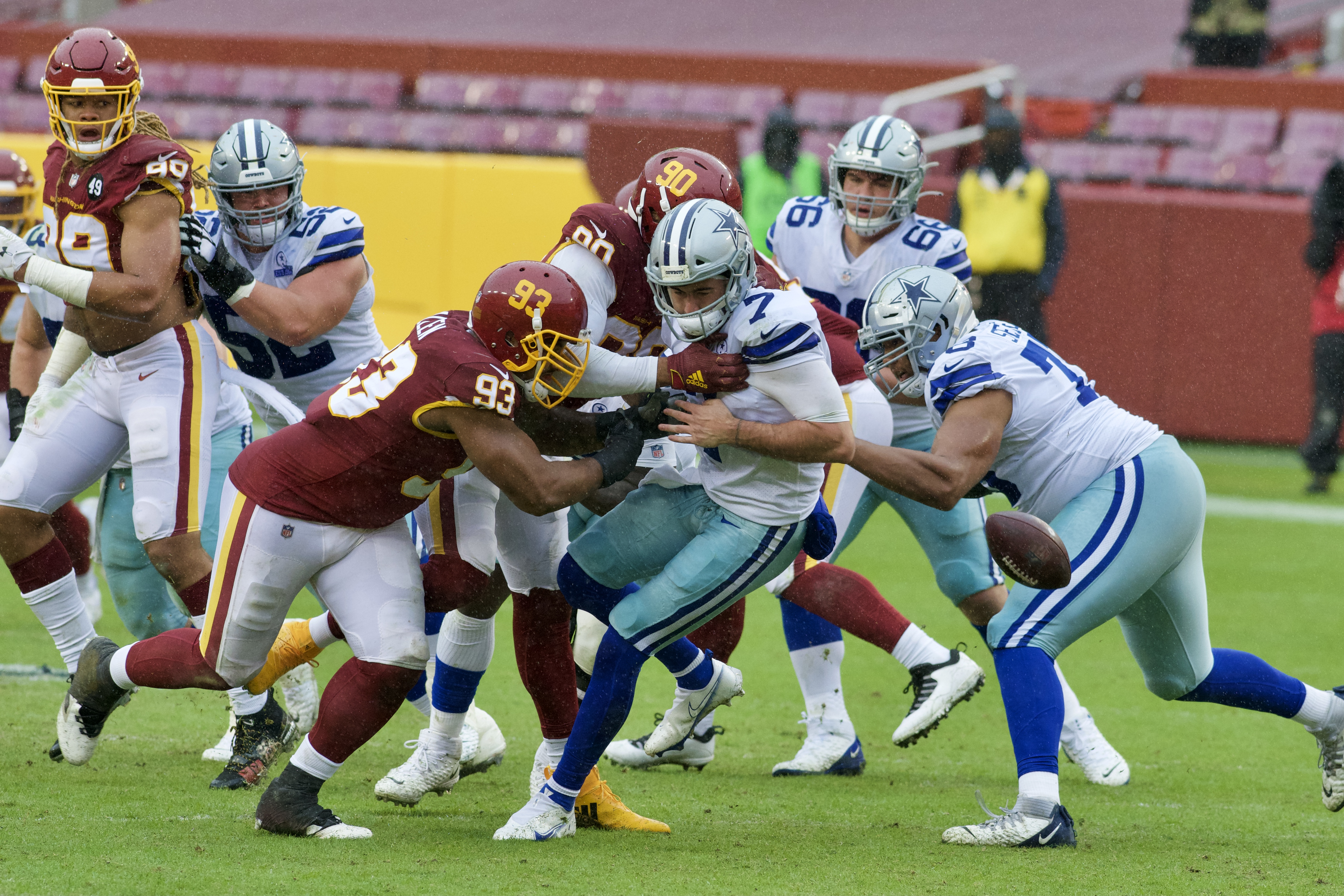
Washington vs. the Dallas Cowboys

Week 7: Dallas Cowboys at Washington Football Team – Game summary

Quarter	1	2	3	4	Total
Cowboys	3	0	0	0	**3**
**Washington**	9	13	0	3	**25**

at FedExField, Landover, Maryland

- Date: October 25
- Game time: 1:00 p.m. EDT
- Game weather: Cloudy, 46 °F (8 °C)
- Game attendance: 0
- Referee: Ronald Torbert
- TV announcers (Fox): Joe Davis, Daryl Johnston and Pam Oliver
- Recap, Game Book

Game information

**First quarter**

- WAS – Dalton Schultz tackled in end zone by Jonathan Allen for a safety, 7:45. Football Team 2–0.
- WAS – Antonio Gibson 12-yard run (Dustin Hopkins kick), 3:48. Football Team 9–0. **Drive: 7 plays, 63 yards, 3:57.**
- DAL – Greg Zuerlein 45-yard field goal, 1:52. Football Team 9–3. **Drive: 4 plays, 7 yards, 1:56.**

**Second quarter**

- WAS – Terry McLaurin 52-yard pass from Kyle Allen (pass failed), 9:54. Football Team 15–3. **Drive: 2 plays, 55 yards, 0:46.**
- WAS – Logan Thomas 15-yard pass from Kyle Allen (Dustin Hopkins kick), 3:08. Football Team 22–3. **Drive: 10 plays, 60 yards, 4:05.**

**Third quarter**

- No scoring plays.

**Fourth quarter**

- WAS – Dustin Hopkins 30-yard field goal, 13:23. Football Team 25–3. **Drive: 11 plays, 63 yards, 4:38.**

**Top passers**

- DAL – Andy Dalton – 9/19, 75 yards, INT
- WAS – Kyle Allen – 15/25, 194 yards, 2 TD

**Top rushers**

- DAL – Ezekiel Elliott – 12 rushes, 45 yards
- WAS – Antonio Gibson – 20 rushes, 128 yards, TD

**Top receivers**

- DAL – Amari Cooper – 7 receptions, 80 yards
- WAS – Terry McLaurin – 7 receptions, 90 yards, TD, INT

Washington's defense had six sacks and only allowed 142 yards of offense. Heading into the bye, the team improved to 2–5, moved to 2–1 in the NFC East, and snapped a three-game losing streak to the Cowboys.

==== Week 9: vs. New York Giants ====
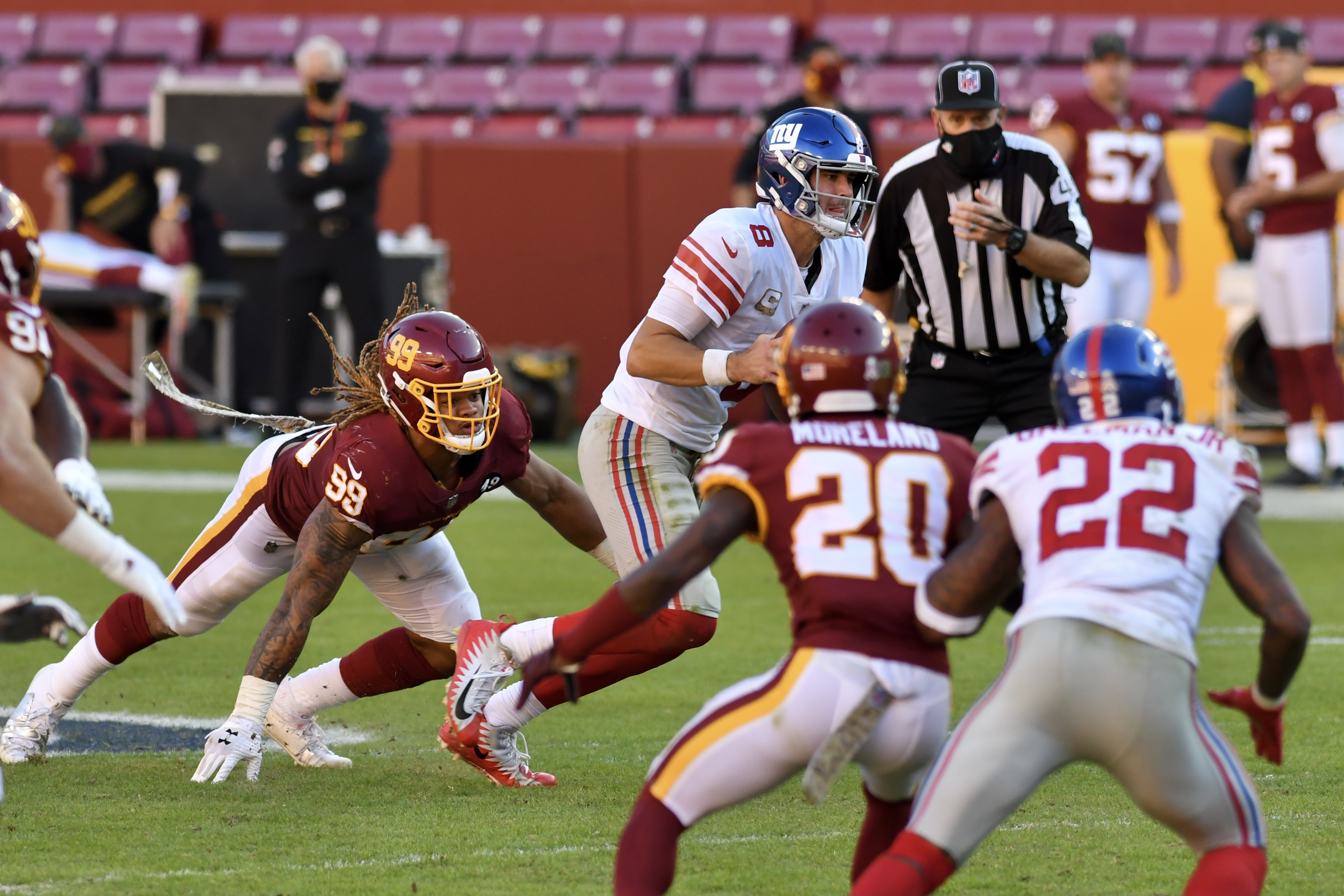
Washington vs. the New York Giants

Week 9: New York Giants at Washington Football Team – Game summary

Quarter	1	2	3	4	Total
**Giants**	10	10	3	0	**23**
Washington	0	3	7	10	**20**

at FedExField, Landover, Maryland

- Date: November 8
- Game time: 1:00 p.m. EST
- Game weather: Sunny, 75 °F (24 °C)
- Game attendance: 3,000
- Referee: Shawn Hochuli
- TV announcers (Fox): Kenny Albert, Jonathan Vilma and Shannon Spake
- Recap, Game Book

Game information

**First quarter**

- NYG – Graham Gano 38-yard field goal, 9:35. Giants 3–0. **Drive: 7 plays, 61 yards, 2:14.**
- NYG – Wayne Gallman 2-yard run (Graham Gano kick), 4:15. Giants 10–0. **Drive: 4 plays, 16 yards, 0:58.**

**Second quarter**

- WAS – Dustin Hopkins 48-yard field goal, 13:05. Giants 10–3. **Drive: 9 plays, 44 yards, 6:10.**
- NYG – Graham Gano 48-yard field goal, 9:24. Giants 13–3. **Drive: 9 plays, 45 yards, 3:41.**
- NYG – Evan Engram 16-yard pass from Daniel Jones (Graham Gano kick), 2:05. Giants 20–3. **Drive: 10 plays, 77 yards, 4:53.**

**Third quarter**

- WAS – Antonio Gibson 1-yard run (Dustin Hopkins kick), 12:24. Giants 20–10. **Drive: 6 plays, 75 yards, 2:36.**
- NYG – Graham Gano 42-yard field goal, 5:12. Giants 23–10. **Drive: 12 plays, 51 yards, 7:12.**

**Fourth quarter**

- WAS – Dustin Hopkins 44-yard field goal, 14:56. Giants 23–13. **Drive: 9 plays, 53 yards, 5:16.**
- WAS – Terry McLaurin 68-yard pass from Alex Smith (Dustin Hopkins kick), 10:24. Giants 23–20. **Drive: 3 plays, 84 yards, 1:00.**

**Top passers**

- NYG – Daniel Jones – 23/34, 212 yards, TD
- WAS – Alex Smith – 24/32, 325 yards, TD, 3 INT

**Top rushers**

- NYG – Wayne Gallman – 14 rushes, 68 yards, TD
- WAS – Antonio Gibson – 6 rushes, 20 yards, TD

**Top receivers**

- NYG – Austin Mack – 4 receptions, 72 yards
- WAS – Terry McLaurin – 7 receptions, 115 yards, TD

In the first and only game with fans, starting quarterback Kyle Allen suffered a gruesome injury early in the game and was subsequently replaced by Alex Smith. Washington failed to complete a 20–3 comeback and lost 23–20 when Smith threw two interceptions on the final two possessions. Washington was swept by the Giants for the second consecutive season and the seventh time dating back to the 2008 season.

==== Week 10: at Detroit Lions ====
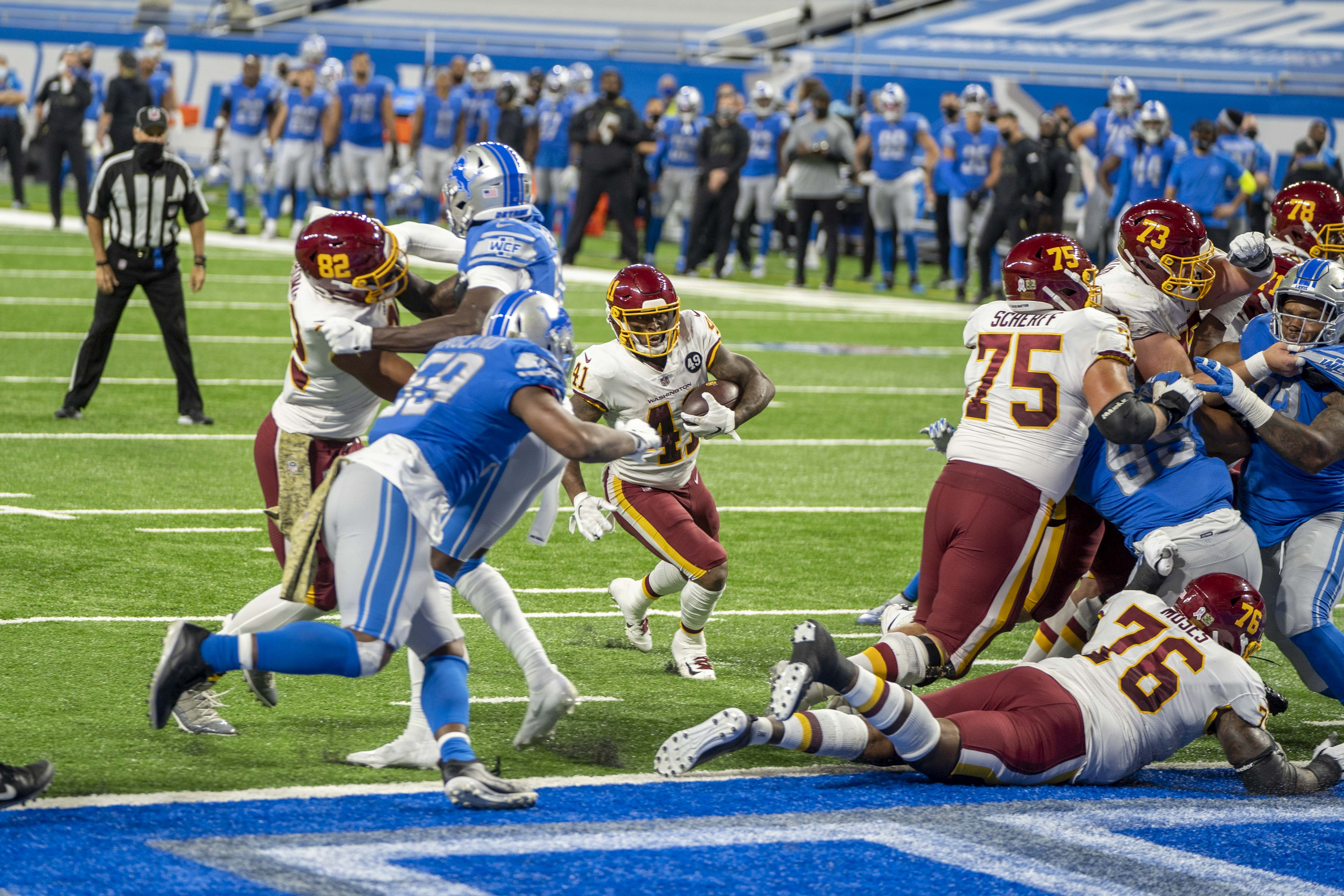
Washington vs. the Detroit Lions

Week 10: Washington Football Team at Detroit Lions – Game summary

Quarter	1	2	3	4	Total
Washington	3	0	7	17	**27**
**Lions**	7	10	7	6	**30**

at Ford Field, Detroit, Michigan

- Date: November 15
- Game time: 1:00 p.m. EST
- Game weather: None (indoor stadium)
- Game attendance: 0
- Referee: Alex Kemp
- TV announcers (Fox): Dan Hellie, Aqib Talib and Megan Olivi
- Recap, Game Book

Game information

**First quarter**

- DET - Marvin Hall 55 yard pass from Matthew Stafford (Matt Prater kick), 7:12. Lions 7–0. **Drive: 5 plays, 92 yards, 1:52.**
- WAS – Dustin Hopkins 38 yard field goal, 3:25. Lions 7–3. **Drive: 9 plays, 54 yards, 3:47.**

**Second quarter**

- DET – Marvin Jones 27 yard pass from Matthew Stafford (Matt Prater kick), 11:55. Lions 14–3. **Drive: 6 plays, 53 yards, 2:07.**
- DET – Matt Prater 53 yard field goal, 0:08. Lions 17–3. **Drive: 7 plays, 34 yards, 1:06.**

**Third quarter**

- DET – D'Andre Swift 15 yard pass from Matthew Stafford (Matt Prater kick), 7:58. Lions 24–3. **Drive: 11 plays, 75 yards, 7:02.**
- WAS – J. D. McKissic 2 yard run (Dustin Hopkins kick), 2:30. Lions 24–10. **Drive: 11 plays, 82 yards, 5:28.**

**Fourth quarter**

- WAS – Antonio Gibson 2 yard run (Dustin Hopkins kick), 11:21. Lions 24–17. **Drive: 11 plays, 84 yards, 4:39.**
- WAS – Antonio Gibson 5 yard run (Dustin Hopkins kick), 6:09. Tied 24–24. **Drive: 6 plays, 66 yards, 2:44.**
- DET – Matt Prater 37 yard field goal, 2:37. Lions 27–24. **Drive: 11 plays, 56 yards, 3:32.**
- WAS – Dustin Hopkins 41 yard field goal, 0:16. Tied 27–27. **Drive: 17 plays, 66 yards, 2:21.**
- DET – Matt Prater 59 yard field goal, 0:00. Lions 30–27. **Drive: 3 plays, 34 yards, 0:16.**

**Top passers**

- WAS – Alex Smith – 38/55, 390 yards
- DET – Matthew Stafford – 24/33, 276 yards, 3 TDs

**Top rushers**

- WAS – Antonio Gibson – 13 rushes, 45 yards, 2 TDs
- DET – D'Andre Swift – 16 rushes, 81 yards

**Top receivers**

- WAS – Terry McLaurin – 7 receptions, 95 yards
- DET – Marvin Jones – 8 receptions, 96 yards, TD

Alex Smith started his first game since Week 11 of the 2018 season. After falling behind 24–3, Smith and the offense rallied with three straight touchdowns by running backs Antonio Gibson and J. D. McKissic in the second half to tie the game at 24. The Lions responded with a field goal and Washington responded with one of their own to tie the game at 27 with 16 seconds to play. However, on the ensuing Detroit drive, kicker Matt Prater drilled a 59-yard field goal as the clock expired. Washington fell to 2–7 after the crushing loss.

==== Week 11: vs. Cincinnati Bengals ====
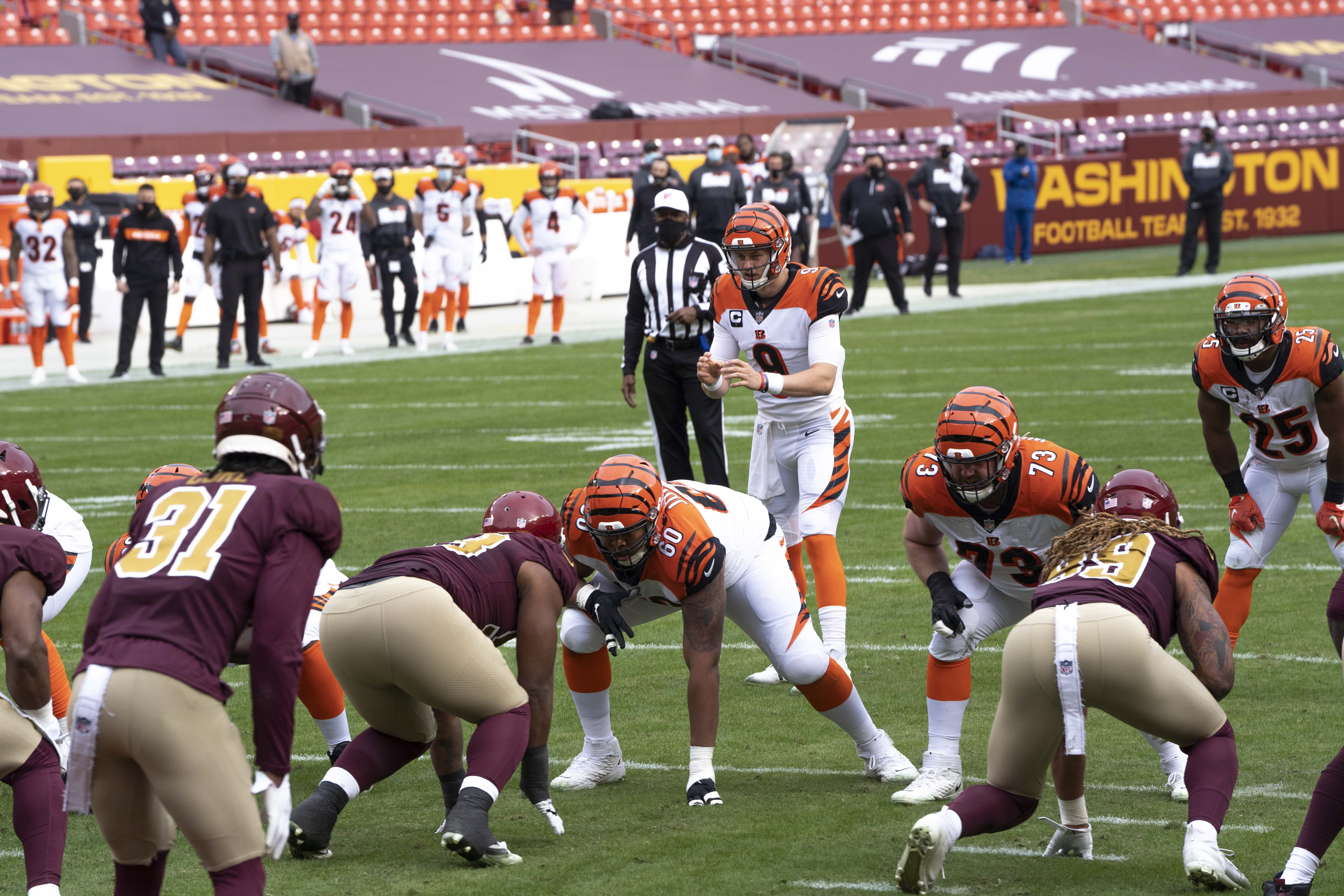
Washington vs. the Cincinnati Bengals

Week 11: Cincinnati Bengals at Washington Football Team – Game summary

Quarter	1	2	3	4	Total
Bengals	0	9	0	0	**9**
**Washington**	7	0	10	3	**20**

at FedExField, Landover, Maryland

- Date: November 22
- Game time: 1:00 p.m. EST
- Game weather: Cloudy, 57 °F (14 °C)
- Game attendance: 0
- Referee: Shawn Smith
- TV announcers (CBS): Spero Dedes and Adam Archuleta
- Recap, Game Book

Game information

**First quarter**

- WAS – Antonio Gibson 1-yard run (Dustin Hopkins kick), 1:38. Football Team 7–0. **Drive: 8 plays, 76 yards, 4:06.**

**Second quarter**

- CIN – A. J. Green 5-yard pass from Joe Burrow (kick failed), 7:32. Football Team 7–6. **Drive: 7 plays, 68 yards, 3:29.**
- CIN – Randy Bullock 53-yard field goal, 1:39. Bengals 9–7. **Drive: 9 plays, 41 yards, 3:39.**

**Third quarter**

- WAS – Steven Sims 3-yard pass from Alex Smith (Dustin Hopkins kick), 8:58. Football Team 14–9. **Drive: 5 plays, 55 yards, 2:27.**
- WAS – Dustin Hopkins 32-yard field goal, 4:47. Football Team 17–9. **Drive: 6 plays, 49 yards, 2:16.**

**Fourth quarter**

- WAS – Dustin Hopkins 50-yard field goal, 9:44. Football Team 20–9. **Drive: 14 plays, 65 yards, 7:24.**

**Top passers**

- CIN – Joe Burrow – 22/34, 203 yards, TD
- WAS – Alex Smith – 17/25, 166 yards, TD, INT

**Top rushers**

- CIN – Samaje Perine – 5 rushes, 19 yards
- WAS – Antonio Gibson – 16 rushes, 94 yards, TD

**Top receivers**

- CIN – Tyler Boyd – 9 receptions, 85 yards
- WAS – Terry McLaurin – 5 receptions, 84 yards

The Bengals were playing a close game against Washington until the third quarter when Bengals rookie quarterback and Heisman Trophy winner Joe Burrow suffered a season-ending knee injury. The Bengals were unable to move the ball with backup Ryan Finley and Washington took control of the game. With the win on Homecoming Weekend, the team improved to 3–7, matching their win total from the previous season. This was Washington's first victory over Cincinnati since their 1991 Super Bowl-winning season and their first at home since 1985.

==== Week 12: at Dallas Cowboys ====
NFL on Thanksgiving Day

Week 12: Washington Football Team at Dallas Cowboys – Game summary

Quarter	1	2	3	4	Total
**Washington**	7	10	3	21	**41**
Cowboys	3	10	3	0	**16**

at AT&T Stadium, Arlington, Texas

- Date: November 26
- Game time: 4:30 p.m. EST/3:30 p.m. CST
- Game weather: Sunny, 73 °F (23 °C) (retractable roof open)
- Game attendance: 30,048
- Referee: Clay Martin
- TV announcers (Fox): Joe Buck, Troy Aikman, Erin Andrews and Kristina Pink
- Recap, Game Book

Game information

**First quarter**

- DAL – Greg Zuerlein 33-yard field goal, 8:30. Cowboys 3–0. **Drive: 11 plays, 57 yards, 4:38.**
- WAS – Antonio Gibson 5-yard run (Dustin Hopkins kick), 1:37. Football Team 7–3. **Drive: 12 plays, 75 yards, 6:53.**

**Second quarter**

- DAL – Amari Cooper 54-yard pass from Andy Dalton (Greg Zuerlein kick), 14:08. Cowboys 10–7. **Drive: 5 plays, 75 yards, 2:29**
- WAS – Dustin Hopkins 23-yard field goal, 7:13. Tied 10–10. **Drive: 14 plays, 67 yards, 6:55**
- WAS – Logan Thomas 5-yard pass from Alex Smith (Dustin Hopkins kick), 2:26. Football Team 17–10. **Drive: 5 plays, 19 yards, 2:51.**
- DAL – Greg Zuerlein 32-yard field goal, 0:19. Football Team 17–13. **Drive: 10 plays, 61 yards, 2:07.**

**Third quarter**

- WAS – Dustin Hopkins 36-yard field goal, 10:48. Football Team 20–13. **Drive: 6 plays, 15 yards, 3:29.**
- DAL – Greg Zuerlein 28-yard field goal, 2:32. Football Team 20–16. **Drive: 4 plays, 6 yards, 1:38.**

**Fourth quarter**

- WAS – Antonio Gibson 23-yard run (Dustin Hopkins kick), 12:07. Football Team 27–16. **Drive: 1 play, 23 yards, 0:06.**
- WAS – Antonio Gibson 37-yard run (Dustin Hopkins kick), 3:31. Football Team 34–16. **Drive: 10 plays, 76 yards, 5:50.**
- WAS – Montez Sweat 15-yard interception return (Dustin Hopkins kick), 3:24. Football Team 41–16.

**Top passers**

- WAS – Alex Smith – 19/26, 149 yards, TD, INT
- DAL – Andy Dalton – 25/35, 215 yards, TD, INT

**Top rushers**

- WAS – Antonio Gibson – 20 rushes, 115 yards, 3 TDs
- DAL – Ezekiel Elliott – 10 rushes, 32 yards

**Top receivers**

- WAS – Terry McLaurin – 7 receptions, 92 yards
- DAL – Amari Cooper – 6 receptions, 112 yards, TD

Washington and Dallas played on Thanksgiving afternoon for the 10th time in the rivalry's history. After a close first half, Washington went on a run of 21 unanswered points in the fourth quarter, including a 15-yard interception return for a touchdown by Montez Sweat, the first of his career. Antonio Gibson became the first rookie with three touchdowns on Thanksgiving since Randy Moss in 1998. With the win, Washington improved to 4–7 and swept Dallas for the first time since 2012 and only the second time since 2005. Washington also won in Dallas on Thanksgiving for the second time ever, the first since 2012, and won for the fourth time on the holiday all-time, their first since 2017. This was Washington's only Thanksgiving appearance as the Washington Football Team.

==== Week 13: at Pittsburgh Steelers ====
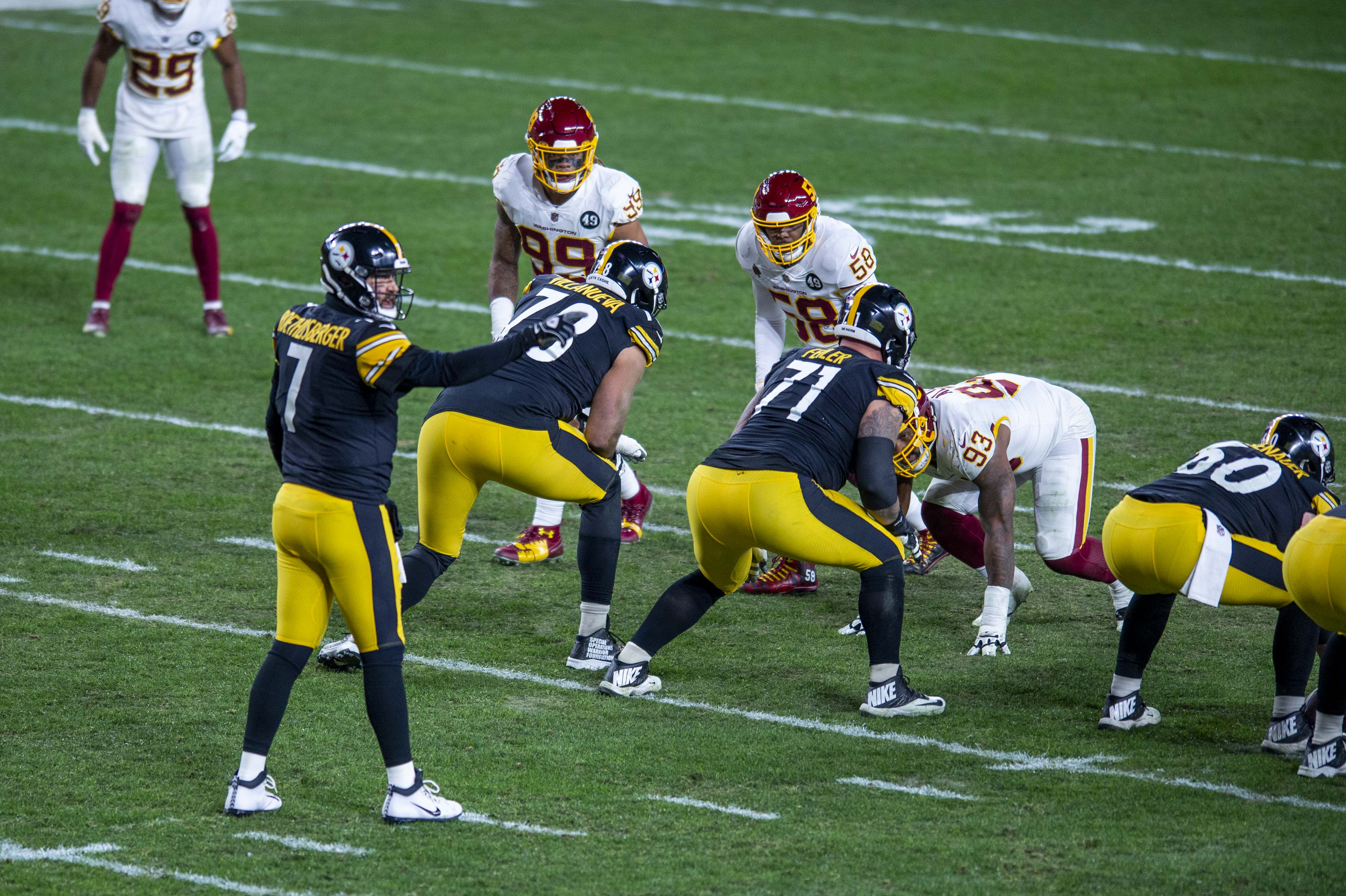
Washington vs. the Pittsburgh Steelers

Week 13: Washington Football Team at Pittsburgh Steelers – Game summary

Quarter	1	2	3	4	Total
**Washington**	0	3	7	13	**23**
Steelers	0	14	0	3	**17**

at Heinz Field, Pittsburgh, Pennsylvania

- Date: December 7
- Game time: 5:00 p.m. EST
- Game weather: Cloudy, 34 °F (1 °C)
- Game attendance: 0
- Referee: John Hussey
- TV announcers (Fox): Kevin Burkhardt, Daryl Johnston and Pam Oliver
- Recap, Game Book

Game information

**First quarter**

- No scoring plays

**Second quarter**

- PIT – Diontae Johnson 3-yard pass from Ben Roethlisberger (Matthew Wright kick), 10:33. Steelers 7–0. **Drive: 14 plays, 72 yards, 6:16.**
- PIT – James Washington 50-yard pass from Ben Roethlisberger (Matthew Wright kick), 3:54. Steelers 14–0. **Drive: 1 play, 50 yards, 0:09.**
- WAS – Dustin Hopkins 49-yard field goal, 0:01. Steelers 14–3. **Drive: 6 plays, 28 yards, 0:49.**

**Third quarter**

- WAS – Peyton Barber 1-yard run (Dustin Hopkins kick), 8:16. Steelers 14–10. **Drive: 14 plays, 82 yards, 6:44.**

**Fourth quarter**

- PIT – Matthew Wright 37-yard field goal, 14:57. Steelers 17–10. **Drive: 11 plays, 63 yards, 4:32.**
- WAS – Logan Thomas 15-yard pass from Alex Smith (Dustin Hopkins kick), 9:09. Tied 17–17. **Drive: 8 plays, 53 yards, 3:14.**
- WAS – Dustin Hopkins 45-yard field goal, 2:04. Football Team 20–17. **Drive: 9 plays, 45 yards, 2:49.**
- WAS – Dustin Hopkins 45-yard field goal, 0:17. Football Team 23–17. **Drive: 4 plays, -2 yards, 1:42.**

**Top passers**

- WAS – Alex Smith – 31/46, 296 yards, TD
- PIT – Ben Roethlisberger – 33/53, 305 yards, 2 TD, INT

**Top rushers**

- WAS – Peyton Barber – 14 rushes, 23 yards, TD
- PIT – Anthony McFarland Jr. – 4 rushes, 15 yards

**Top receivers**

- WAS – Logan Thomas – 9 receptions, 98 yards, TD
- PIT – James Washington – 2 receptions, 80 yards, TD

The game was originally scheduled for Sunday, but was postponed to Monday due to scheduling changes amid the COVID-19 pandemic. While down 14–0 in the second quarter, Washington got a quick field goal before halftime and opened the second half with a Peyton Barber touchdown run to cut the deficit to 14–10 before the Steelers offense regained possession. Their defense clamped down, only allowing 120 total yards in the second half. Logan Thomas tied the game mid-way through the fourth quarter while Jon Bostic intercepted a pass tipped by Montez Sweat with 1:59 to play. Kicker Dustin Hopkins made two field goals to put the game at 23–17, which the Steelers were not able to recover from. With the win, Washington improved to 5–7, having won three straight games for the first time since Weeks 6–8 of the 2018 season. This was also Washington's first win over Pittsburgh since their 1991 Super Bowl-winning season.

==== Week 14: at San Francisco 49ers ====
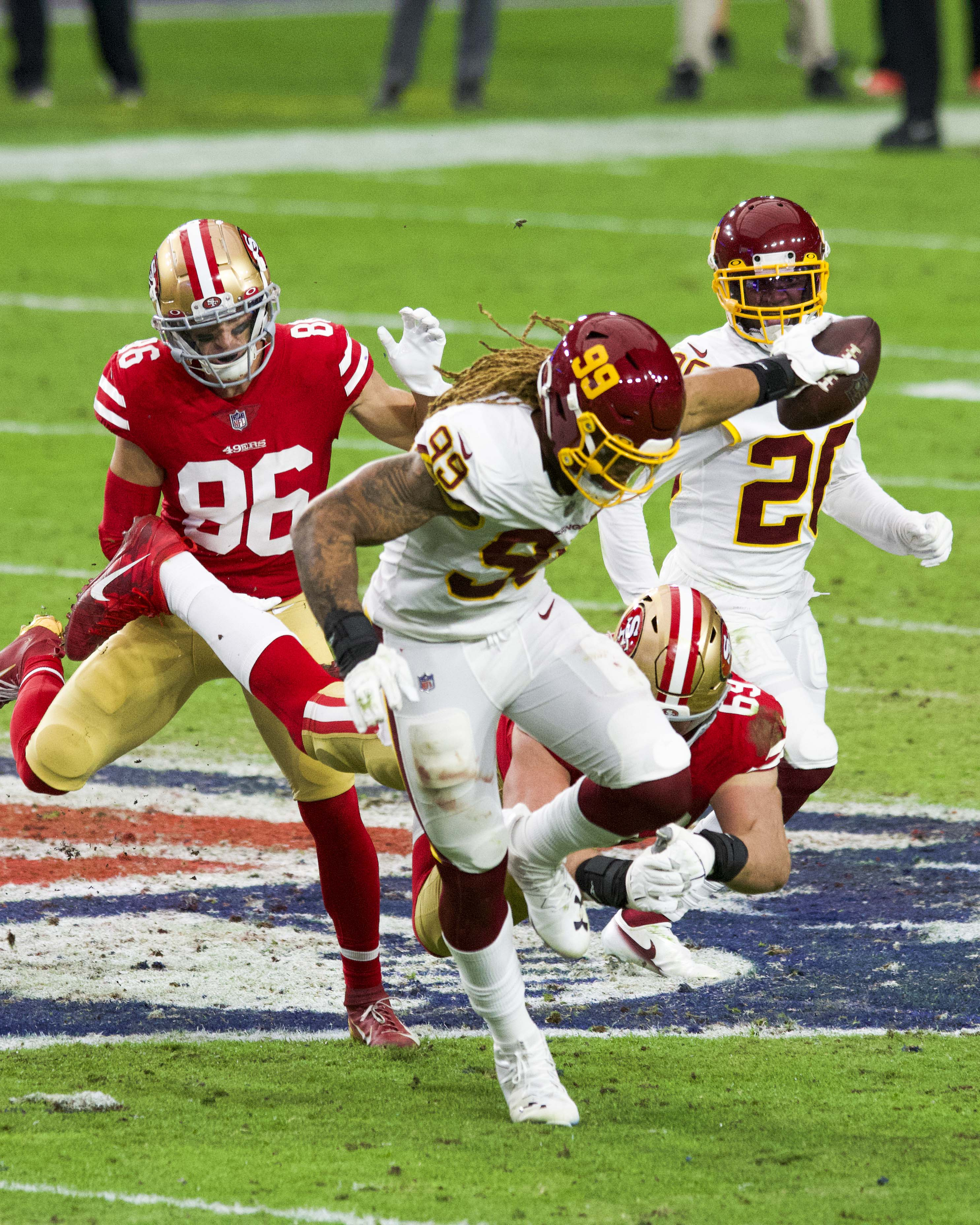
Washington vs. the San Francisco 49ers

Week 14: Washington Football Team at San Francisco 49ers – Game summary

Quarter	1	2	3	4	Total
**Washington**	0	13	10	0	**23**
49ers	7	0	0	8	**15**

at State Farm Stadium, Glendale, Arizona

- Date: December 13
- Game time: 4:25 p.m. EST/2:25 p.m. MST
- Game weather: None (retractable roof closed)
- Game attendance: 0
- Referee: Carl Cheffers
- TV announcers (Fox): Chris Myers, Greg Jennings, and Jen Hale
- Recap, Game Book

Game information

**First quarter**

- SF – Jeff Wilson 1-yard run (Robbie Gould kick), 0:47. 49ers 7–0. **Drive: 7 plays, 57 yards, 4:23.**

**Second quarter**

- WAS – Dustin Hopkins 51-yard field goal, 5:45. 49ers 7–3. **Drive: 7 plays, 29 yards, 3:49.**
- WAS – Dustin Hopkins 31-yard field goal, 3:06. 49ers 7–6. **Drive: 6 plays, 13 yards, 1:57.**
- WAS – Chase Young 47-yard fumble return (Dustin Hopkins kick), 0:58. Washington 13–7.

**Third quarter**

- WAS – Dustin Hopkins 21-yard field goal, 10:05. Washington 16–7. **Drive: 11 plays, 72 yards, 4:55.**
- WAS – Kamren Curl 76-yard interception return (Dustin Hopkins kick), 0:00. Washington 23–7.

**Fourth quarter**

- SF – Kyle Juszczyk 6-yard pass from Nick Mullens (Nick Mullens–Kendrick Bourne pass), 10:18. Washington 23–15. **Drive: 11 plays, 75 yards, 4:42.**

**Top passers**

- WAS – Alex Smith – 8/19, 57 yards, INT
- SF – Nick Mullens – 25/45, 260 yards, TD, INT

**Top rushers**

- WAS – J. D. McKissic – 11 rushes, 68 yards
- SF – Raheem Mostert – 14 rushes, 65 yards

**Top receivers**

- WAS – Logan Thomas – 6 receptions, 43 yards
- SF – Brandon Aiyuk – 10 receptions, 119 yards

With scores from rookie defenders Chase Young and Kamren Curl, Washington scored two defensive touchdowns in a game for the first time since Week 17 of the 1997 season, when Darryl Pounds and Hall of Famer Darrell Green accomplished this feat. With the win, Washington improved their record to 6–7 and, with the Giants' loss to the Arizona Cardinals earlier that day, took over sole possession of first place in the NFC East. Washington also won four games in a row for the first time since 2016.

==== Week 15: vs. Seattle Seahawks ====
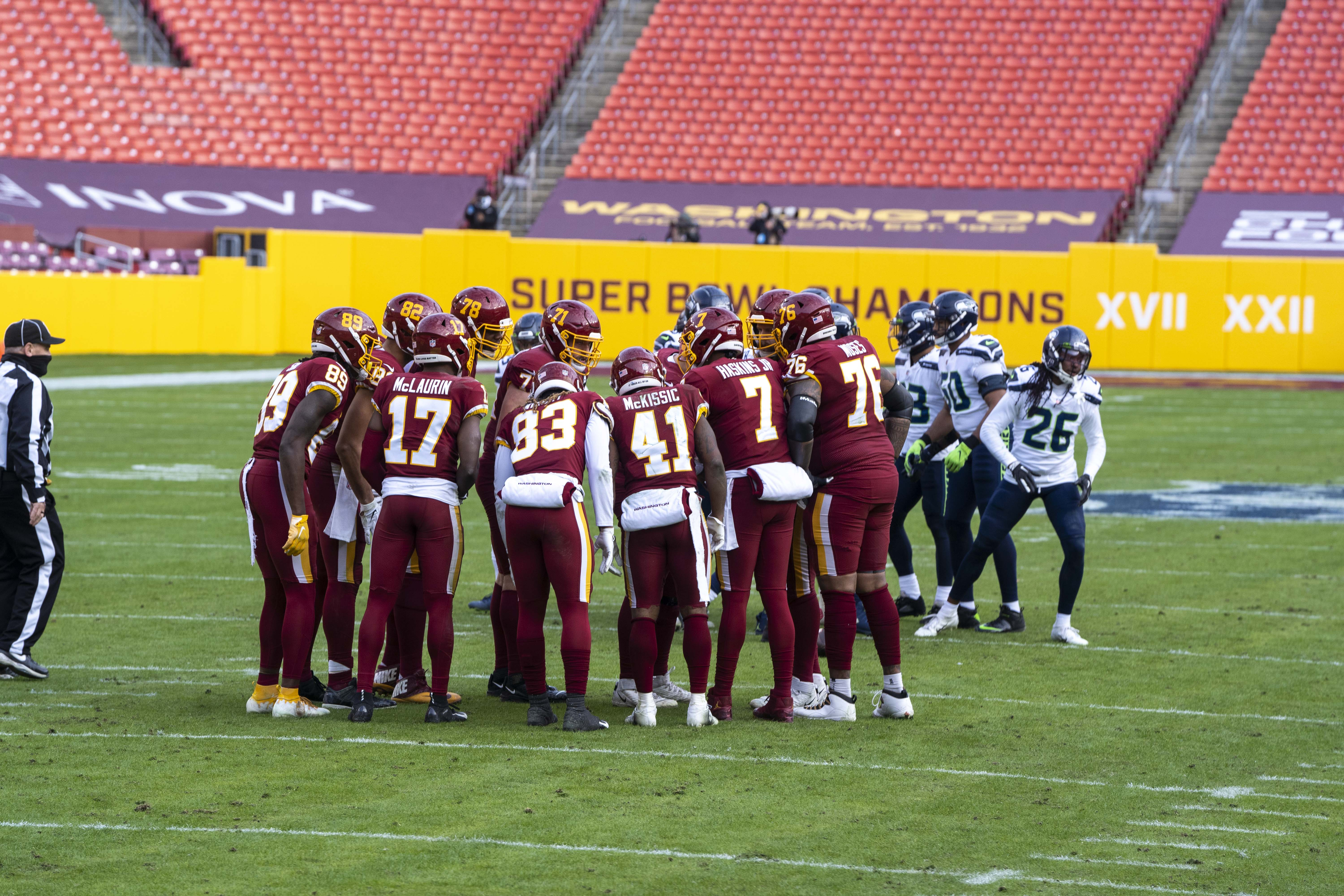
Washington vs. the Seattle Seahawks

Week 15: Seattle Seahawks at Washington Football Team – Game summary

Quarter	1	2	3	4	Total
**Seahawks**	3	10	7	0	**20**
Washington	0	3	0	12	**15**

at FedExField, Landover, Maryland

- Date: December 20
- Game time: 1:00 p.m. EST
- Game weather: Cloudy, 43 °F (6 °C)
- Game attendance: 0
- Referee: Adrian Hill
- TV announcers (Fox): Kenny Albert, Jonathan Vilma and Shannon Spake
- Recap, Game Book

Game information

**First quarter**

- SEA – Jason Myers 43-yard field goal, 8:50. Seahawks 3–0. **Drive: 8 plays, 30 yards, 4:00.**

**Second quarter**

- SEA – Jason Myers 40-yard field goal, 10:52. Seahawks 6–0. **Drive: 10 plays, 47 yards, 4:21.**
- SEA – Jacob Hollister 10-yard pass from Russell Wilson (Jason Myers kick), 1:45. Seahawks 13–0. **Drive: 10 plays, 97 yards, 5:05.**
- WAS – Dustin Hopkins 48-yard field goal, 0:06. Seahawks 13–3. **Drive: 11 plays, 46 yards, 1:39.**

**Third quarter**

- SEA – Carlos Hyde 50-yard run (Jason Myers kick), 13:12. Seahawks 20–3. **Drive: 4 plays, 75 yards, 1:48.**

**Fourth quarter**

- WAS – Peyton Barber 1-yard run (kick failed), 14:14. Seahawks 20–9. **Drive: 14 plays, 96 yards, 5:50.**
- WAS – J. D. McKissic 6-yard pass from Dwayne Haskins (run failed), 7:16. Seahawks 20–15. **Drive: 11 plays, 64 yards, 3:57.**

**Top passers**

- SEA – Russell Wilson – 18/27, 121 yards, TD, INT
- WAS – Dwayne Haskins – 38/55, 295 yards, TD, 2 INT

**Top rushers**

- SEA – Chris Carson – 15 rushes, 63 yards
- WAS – J. D. McKissic – 13 rushes, 51 yards

**Top receivers**

- SEA – DK Metcalf – 5 receptions, 43 yards
- WAS – Logan Thomas – 13 receptions, 101 yards

With the loss, Washington fell to 6–8 and failed to clinch their first winning season since 2016.

==== Week 16: vs. Carolina Panthers ====
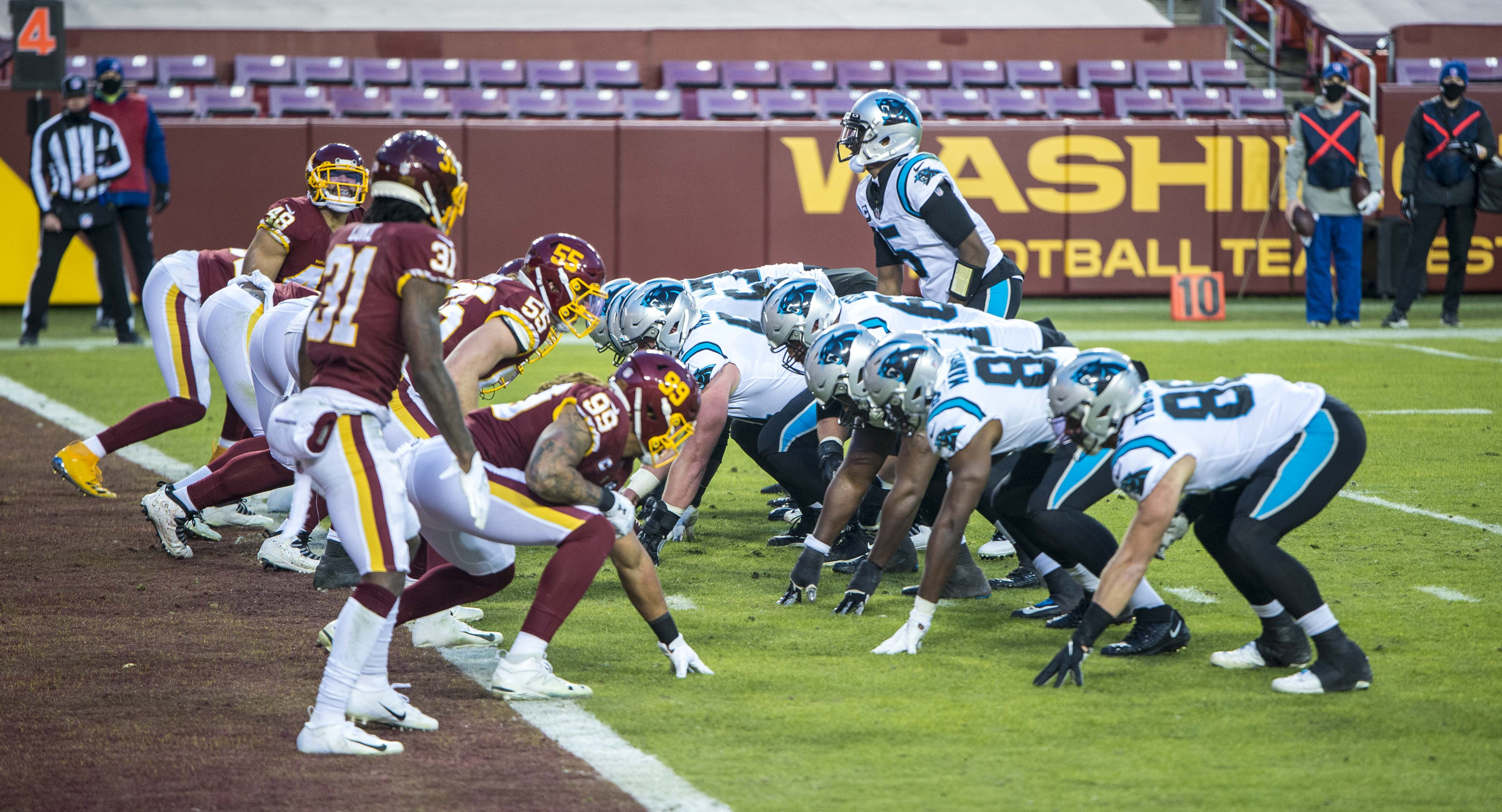
Washington vs. the Carolina Panthers

Week 16: Carolina Panthers at Washington Football Team – Game summary

Quarter	1	2	3	4	Total
**Panthers**	6	14	0	0	**20**
Washington	0	3	3	7	**13**

at FedExField, Landover, Maryland

- Date: December 27
- Game time: 4:05 p.m. EST
- Game weather: Sunny, 41 °F (5 °C)
- Game attendance: 0
- Referee: Carl Cheffers
- TV announcers (CBS): Ian Eagle, Charles Davis and Evan Washburn
- Recap, Game Book

Game information

**First quarter**

- CAR – Brandon Zylstra fumble recovery in end zone (kick failed), 1:42. Panthers 6–0.

**Second quarter**

- CAR – Mike Davis 1-yard run (Joey Slye kick), 8:37. Panthers 13–0. **Drive: 10 plays, 80 yards, 6:14.**
- CAR – Robby Anderson 14-yard pass from Teddy Bridgewater (Joey Slye kick), 3:06. Panthers 20–0. **Drive: 6 plays, 55 yards, 3:34.**
- WAS – Dustin Hopkins 48-yard field goal, 1:20. Panthers 20–3. **Drive: 9 plays, 45 yards, 1:46.**

**Third quarter**

- WAS – Dustin Hopkins 26-yard field goal, 4:01. Panthers 20–6. **Drive: 7 plays, 66 yards, 2:56.**

**Fourth quarter**

- WAS – J. D. McKissic 29-yard pass from Taylor Heinicke (Dustin Hopkins kick), 1:50. Panthers 20–13. **Drive: 8 plays, 91 yards, 1:19.**

**Top passers**

- CAR – Teddy Bridgewater – 19/28, 197 yards, TD, INT
- WAS – Dwayne Haskins – 14/28, 154 yards, 2 INT

**Top rushers**

- CAR – Curtis Samuel – 7 rushes, 52 yards
- WAS – Antonio Gibson – 10 rushes, 61 yards

**Top receivers**

- CAR – Curtis Samuel – 5 receptions, 106 yards
- WAS – J. D. McKissic – 8 receptions, 77 yards, TD

With a Giants loss to the Baltimore Ravens earlier that afternoon, Washington had an opportunity to clinch the division title against Carolina. The team instead put together a performance of errors, including a mishandled punt by Steven Sims that was recovered for a Panthers touchdown, a 10-play scoring drive of all run plays allowed by the defense and an additional three turnovers from Dwayne Haskins, who was eventually benched in the fourth quarter for Taylor Heinicke. With their second consecutive loss, the team dropped to 6–9 and clinched their fourth straight losing season. Haskins was released by the team the following day.

==== Week 17: at Philadelphia Eagles ====
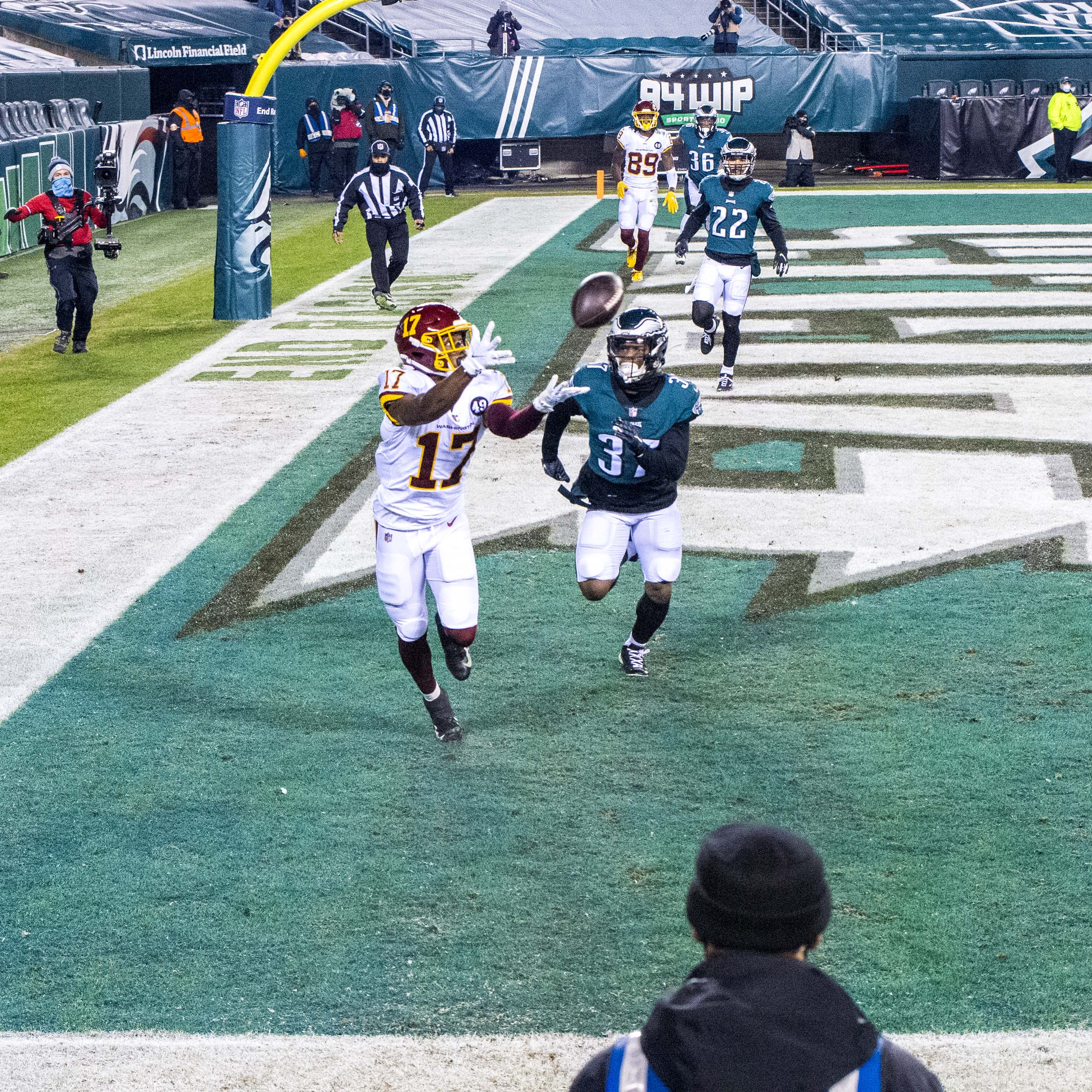
Washington vs. the Philadelphia Eagles

Week 17: Washington Football Team at Philadelphia Eagles – Game summary

Quarter	1	2	3	4	Total
**Washington**	10	7	0	3	**20**
Eagles	0	14	0	0	**14**

at Lincoln Financial Field, Philadelphia, Pennsylvania

- Date: January 3, 2021
- Game time: 8:20 p.m. EST
- Game weather: Rain, 38 °F (3 °C)
- Game attendance: 0
- Referee: Ronald Torbert
- TV announcers (NBC): Al Michaels, Cris Collinsworth, Michele Tafoya and Terry McAulay
- Recap, Game Book

Game information

**First quarter**

- WAS – Terry McLaurin 5-yard pass from Alex Smith (Dustin Hopkins kick), 4:19. Football Team 7–0. **Drive: 15 plays, 91 yards, 8:13.**
- WAS – Dustin Hopkins 42-yard field goal, 2:02. Football Team 10–0. **Drive: 4 plays, 8 yards, 2:06.**

**Second quarter**

- PHI – Jalen Hurts 6-yard run (Jake Elliott kick), 10:18. Football Team 10–7. **Drive: 10 plays, 75 yards, 6:44.**
- PHI – Jalen Hurts 6-yard run (Jake Elliott kick), 3:54. Eagles 14–10. **Drive: 7 plays, 65 yards, 4:09.**
- WAS – Logan Thomas 13-yard pass from Alex Smith (Dustin Hopkins kick), 0:20. Football Team 17–14. **Drive: 9 plays, 55 yards, 1:04.**

**Third quarter**

- No scoring plays.

**Fourth quarter**

- WAS – Dustin Hopkins 42-yard field goal, 7:42. Football Team 20–14. **Drive: 4 plays, 1 yard, 1:52.**

**Top passers**

- WAS – Alex Smith – 22/32, 162 yards, 2 TD, 2 INT
- PHI – Jalen Hurts – 7/20, 72 yards, INT

**Top rushers**

- WAS – Antonio Gibson – 19 rushes, 75 yards
- PHI – Boston Scott – 15 rushes, 65 yards

**Top receivers**

- WAS – Cam Sims – 5 receptions, 43 yards
- PHI – J. J. Arcega-Whiteside – 2 receptions, 40 yards

In a matchup that was flexed to NBC Sunday Night Football, Washington defeated the Eagles 20–14 to clinch the NFC East for the first time since the 2015 season. This was Washington's first sweep of Philadelphia since the 2016 season. With a final record of 7–9, Washington became just the third team in league history to win their division with a losing record after the 2010 Seattle Seahawks and 2014 Carolina Panthers, the latter of whom were also coached by Rivera. They also became the first team in NFL history to clinch a playoff berth after starting the season 2–7.

== Standings ==
=== Division ===
NFC East
	W	L	T	PCT	DIV	CONF	PF	PA	STK
^{(4)} Washington Football Team	7	9	0	.438	4–2	5–7	335	329	W1
New York Giants	6	10	0	.375	4–2	5–7	280	357	W1
Dallas Cowboys	6	10	0	.375	2–4	5–7	395	473	L1
Philadelphia Eagles	4	11	1	.281	2–4	4–8	334	418	L3

=== Conference ===
NFC
#	Team	Division	W	L	T	PCT	DIV	CONF	SOS	SOV	STK
Division leaders
1	Green Bay Packers	North	13	3	0	.813	5–1	10–2	.428	.387	W6
2 (Note: New Orleans finished ahead of Seattle based on conference record.)	New Orleans Saints	South	12	4	0	.750	6–0	10–2	.459	.406	W2
3	Seattle Seahawks	West	12	4	0	.750	4–2	9–3	.447	.404	W4
4	Washington Football Team	East	7	9	0	.438	4–2	5–7	.459	.388	W1
Wild cards
5	Tampa Bay Buccaneers	South	11	5	0	.688	4–2	8–4	.488	.392	W4
6	Los Angeles Rams	West	10	6	0	.625	3–3	9–3	.494	.484	W1
7 (Note: Chicago finished and clinched the 7th and final playoff spot ahead of Arizona based on better win percentage in common games (against Detroit, the NY Giants, Carolina, and the LA Rams, Chicago finished 3–2, while Arizona finished 1–4).)	Chicago Bears	North	8	8	0	.500	2–4	6–6	.488	.336	L1
Did not qualify for the postseason
8	Arizona Cardinals	West	8	8	0	.500	2–4	6–6	.475	.441	L2
9	Minnesota Vikings	North	7	9	0	.438	4–2	5–7	.504	.366	W1
10 (Note: San Francisco finished ahead of the NY Giants based on head-to-head victory. Division tie break was initially used to eliminate Dallas (see below).)	San Francisco 49ers	West	6	10	0	.375	3–3	4–8	.549	.448	L1
11 (Note: NY Giants won tiebreaker over Dallas based on division record.)	New York Giants	East	6	10	0	.375	4–2	5–7	.502	.427	W1
12	Dallas Cowboys	East	6	10	0	.375	2–4	5–7	.471	.333	L1
13 (Note: Carolina finished ahead of Detroit based on head-to-head victory.)	Carolina Panthers	South	5	11	0	.313	1–5	4–8	.531	.388	L1
14	Detroit Lions	North	5	11	0	.313	1–5	4–8	.508	.350	L4
15	Philadelphia Eagles	East	4	11	1	.281	2–4	4–8	.537	.469	L3
16	Atlanta Falcons	South	4	12	0	.250	1–5	2–10	.551	.391	L5
Tiebreakers (Note: When breaking ties for three or more teams under the NFL's rules, they are first broken within divisions, then comparing only the highest-ranked remaining team from each division.)

== Postseason ==
=== Schedule ===
Round	Date	Opponent (seed)	Result	Record	Venue	Recap
Wild Card	January 9, 2021	Tampa Bay Buccaneers (5)	L 23–31	0–1	FedExField	Recap

=== Game summaries ===
==== NFC Wild Card Playoffs: vs. (5) Tampa Bay Buccaneers ====
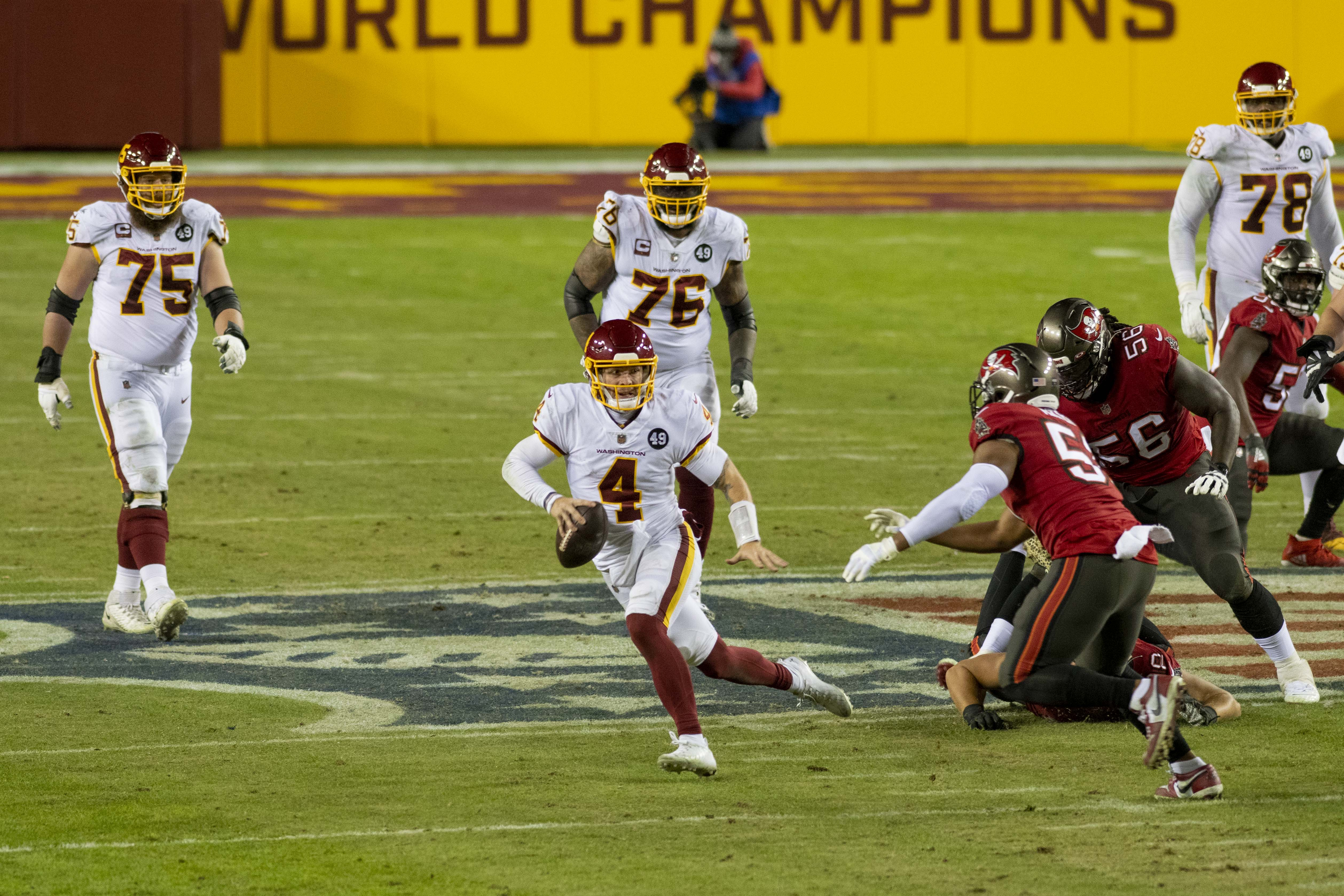
Washington vs. the Tampa Bay Buccaneers

NFC Wild Card Playoffs: (5) Tampa Bay Buccaneers at (4) Washington Football Team – Game summary

Quarter	1	2	3	4	Total
Buccaneers	9	9	0	13	31
Washington	0	7	9	7	23

at FedExField, Landover, Maryland

- Date: January 9, 2021
- Game time: 8:15 p.m. EST
- Game weather: Clear, 40 °F (4 °C)
- Game attendance: 0
- Referee: Scott Novak
- TV announcers (NBC): Mike Tirico, Tony Dungy and Kathryn Tappen
- Recap, Game Book

Game information

First quarter

- TB – Ryan Succop 29-yard field goal, 11:49. Buccaneers 3–0. Drive: 9 plays, 70 yards, 3:11.
- TB – Antonio Brown 36-yard pass from Tom Brady (kick blocked), 2:51. Buccaneers 9–0. Drive: 6 plays, 58 yards, 2:06.

Second quarter

- WAS – J. D. McKissic 2-yard run (Dustin Hopkins kick), 12:59. Buccaneers 9–7. Drive: 10 plays, 75 yards, 4:52.
- TB – Chris Godwin 27-yard pass from Tom Brady (run failed), 10:03. Buccaneers 15–7. Drive: 5 plays, 61 yards, 2:56.
- TB – Ryan Succop 23-yard field goal, 1:50. Buccaneers 18–7. Drive: 10 plays, 82 yards, 4:20.

Third quarter

- WAS – Dustin Hopkins 36-yard field goal, 11:46. Buccaneers 18–10. Drive: 7 plays, 52 yards, 3:14.
- WAS – Taylor Heinicke 8-yard run (pass failed), 2:14. Buccaneers 18–16. Drive: 7 plays, 61 yards, 3:39.

Fourth quarter

- TB – Ryan Succop 38-yard field goal, 13:32. Buccaneers 21–16. Drive: 9 plays, 55 yards, 3:42.
- TB – Leonard Fournette 3-yard run (Ryan Succop kick), 9:11. Buccaneers 28–16. Drive: 7 plays, 69 yards, 3:22.
- WAS – Steven Sims 11-yard pass from Taylor Heinicke (Dustin Hopkins kick), 4:51. Buccaneers 28–23. Drive: 11 plays, 75 yards, 4:20.
- TB – Ryan Succop 37-yard field goal, 2:49. Buccaneers 31–23. Drive: 7 plays, 58 yards, 2:02.

Top passers

- TB – Tom Brady – 22/40, 381 yards, 2 TD
- WAS – Taylor Heinicke – 26/44, 306 yards, TD, INT

Top rushers

- TB – Leonard Fournette – 19 rushes, 93 yards, TD
- WAS – Taylor Heinicke – 6 rushes, 46 yards, TD

Top receivers

- TB – Mike Evans – 6 receptions, 119 yards
- WAS – Cam Sims – 7 receptions, 104 yards

Despite a late comeback and a strong performance from quarterback Taylor Heinicke, Washington's season ended at the hands of Tom Brady and the eventual Super Bowl LV champion Tampa Bay Buccaneers with a 31–23 home loss. It was Washington's fifth straight playoff loss dating back to 2005 and their third consecutive home playoff loss dating back to 1999.
