= 2024 Washington Commanders season =

93rd season in franchise history

- Owner: Josh Harris
- General manager: Adam Peters
- President: Jason Wright
- Head coach: Dan Quinn
- Offensive coordinator: Kliff Kingsbury
- Defensive coordinator: Joe Whitt Jr.
- Home stadium: Northwest Stadium

Results
- Record: 12–5
- Division place: 2nd NFC East
- Playoffs: Won Wild Card Playoffs; (at Buccaneers) 23–20; Won Divisional Playoffs; (at Lions) 45–31; Lost NFC Championship; (at Eagles) 23–55
- All-Pros: 4 (2nd team): WR Terry McLaurin; OLB Frankie Luvu; MLB Bobby Wagner; KR Austin Ekeler
- Pro Bowlers: QB Jayden Daniels; WR Terry McLaurin; MLB Bobby Wagner

Uniform
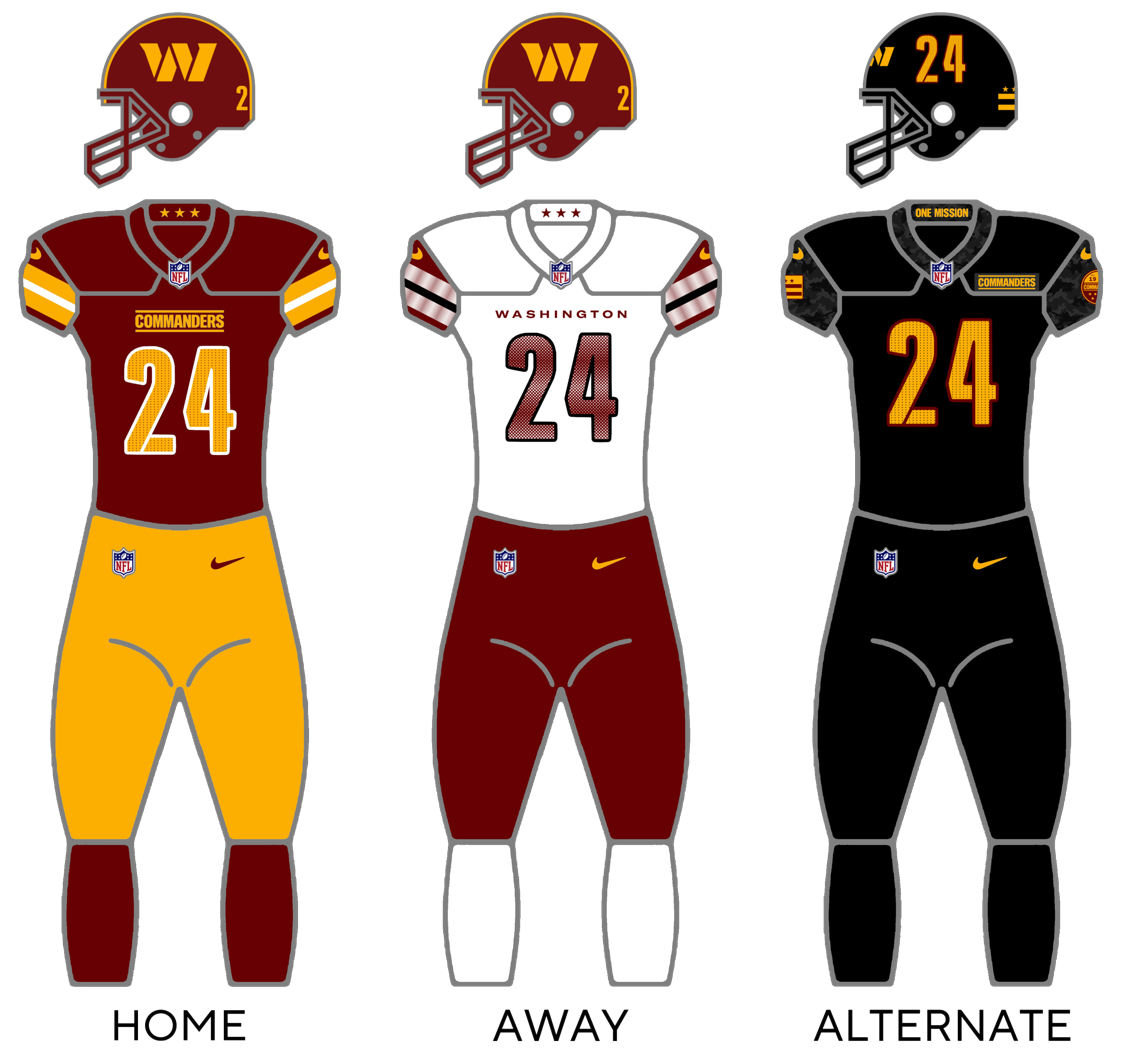

The 2024 season was the Washington Commanders' 93rd in the National Football League (NFL). It was the first season under the tandem of general manager Adam Peters and head coach Dan Quinn, with other coaching staff additions including Kliff Kingsbury as offensive coordinator and Joe Whitt Jr. as defensive coordinator. The team improved their 4–13 record from 2023 to 12–5, marking their first winning regular season since 2016 and best record since 1991. The season also featured their first playoff win since 2005 and first NFC Championship Game appearance since 1991, both snapping the longest active droughts in the conference, before losing to the division rival and eventual Super Bowl LIX champion Philadelphia Eagles. It was only their 7th playoff appearance in 32 seasons.

The season was the Commanders eighth straight having a different quarterback start opening week, with previous starter Sam Howell traded during the offseason. The team selected quarterback Jayden Daniels with the second overall pick in the 2024 NFL draft. He set the NFL record for most rushing yards in a season by a rookie quarterback en route to earning NFL Offensive Rookie of the Year honors. The season also featured the Hail Maryland, a game-winning Hail Mary play against the Chicago Bears from Daniels to wide receiver Noah Brown. The team's offense ranked among the franchise's best, tying for the second-most total points in a season with 485. Wide receiver Terry McLaurin set the franchise record for touchdown catches in a season with 13. McLaurin, linebackers Frankie Luvu and Bobby Wagner, and kick returner Austin Ekeler were second-team All-Pro selections.

== Overview ==
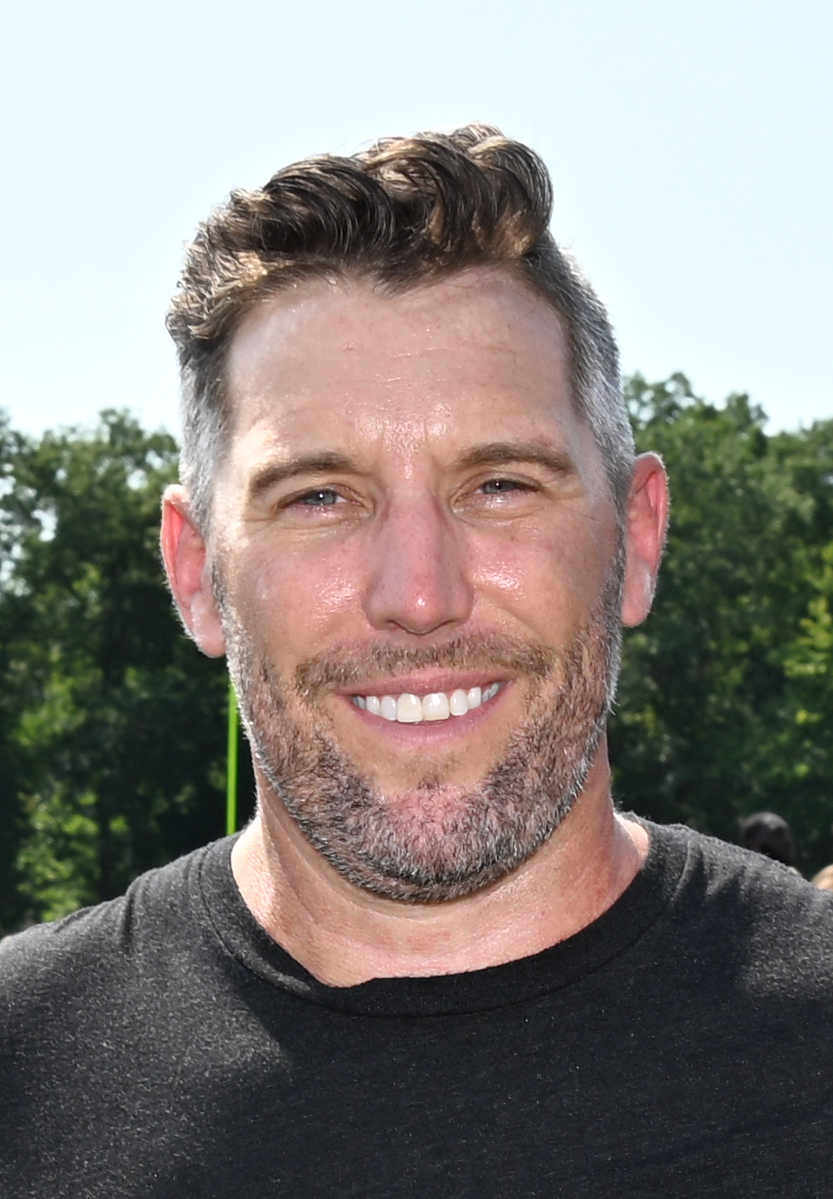
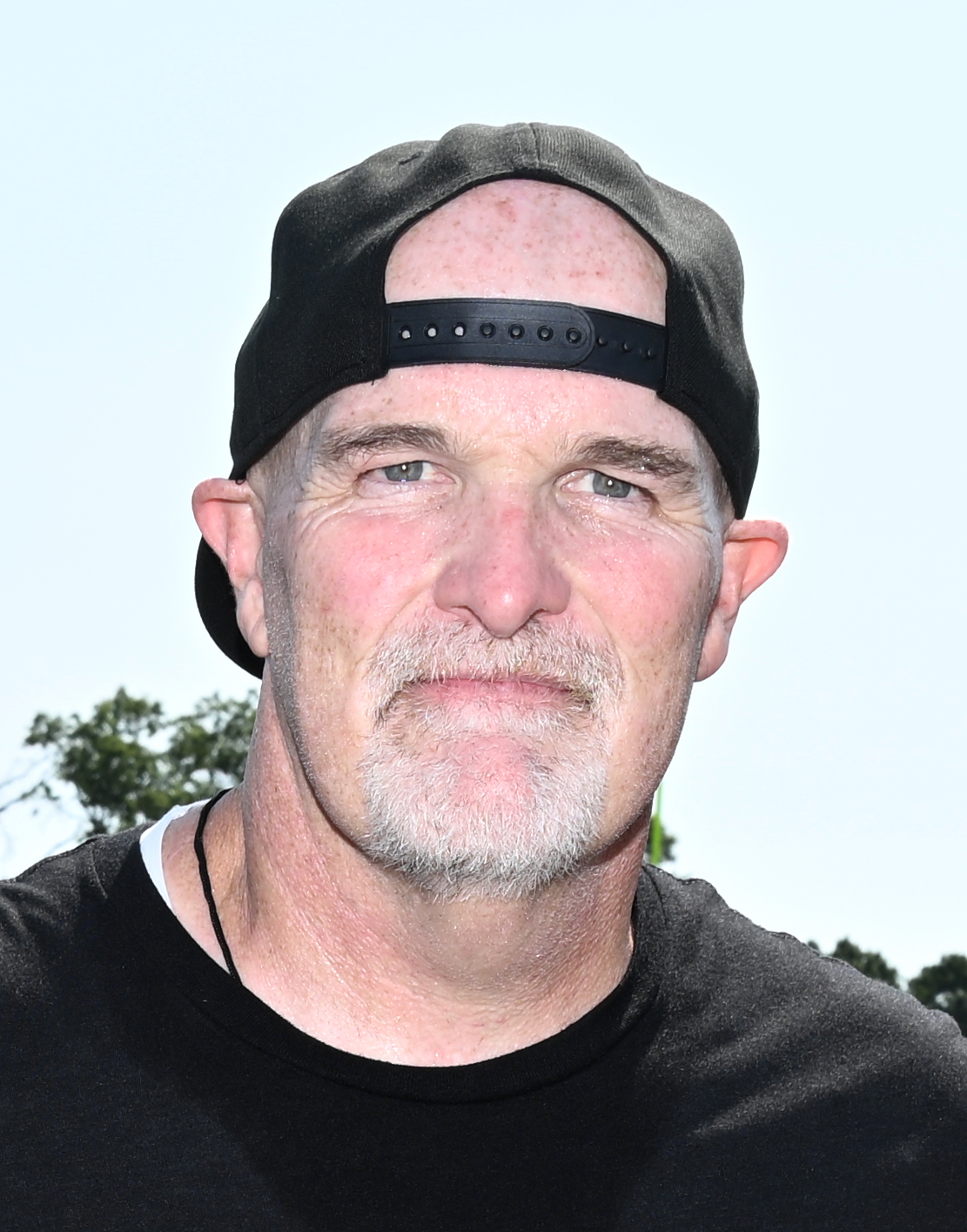
The season was the first under general manager Adam Peters and head coach Dan Quinn.

Head coach Ron Rivera was fired following a 4–13 record in the 2023 season, with team owner Josh Harris employing Bob Myers and Rick Spielman as advisors in search of the next general manager and head coach. San Francisco 49ers assistant general manager Adam Peters was first hired as general manager in January, who hired Dallas Cowboys defensive coordinator and former Atlanta Falcons head coach Dan Quinn for the same role the following month. The front office saw several changes under Peters, including hiring Detroit Lions executives Lance Newmark and Brandon Sosna respectively as assistant general manager and senior vice president of football operations, Baltimore Ravens scout David Blackburn as director of player personnel, longtime NFL executive Dave Gardi as senior vice president of football initiatives, and former Carolina Panthers general manager Scott Fitterer as a personnel executive. Other changes included the departure of president Jason Wright and personnel executives Eric Stokes and Chris Polian, with ex-general manager Martin Mayhew reassigned to senior personnel executive and ex-vice president of football and player personnel Marty Hurney becoming an advisor.

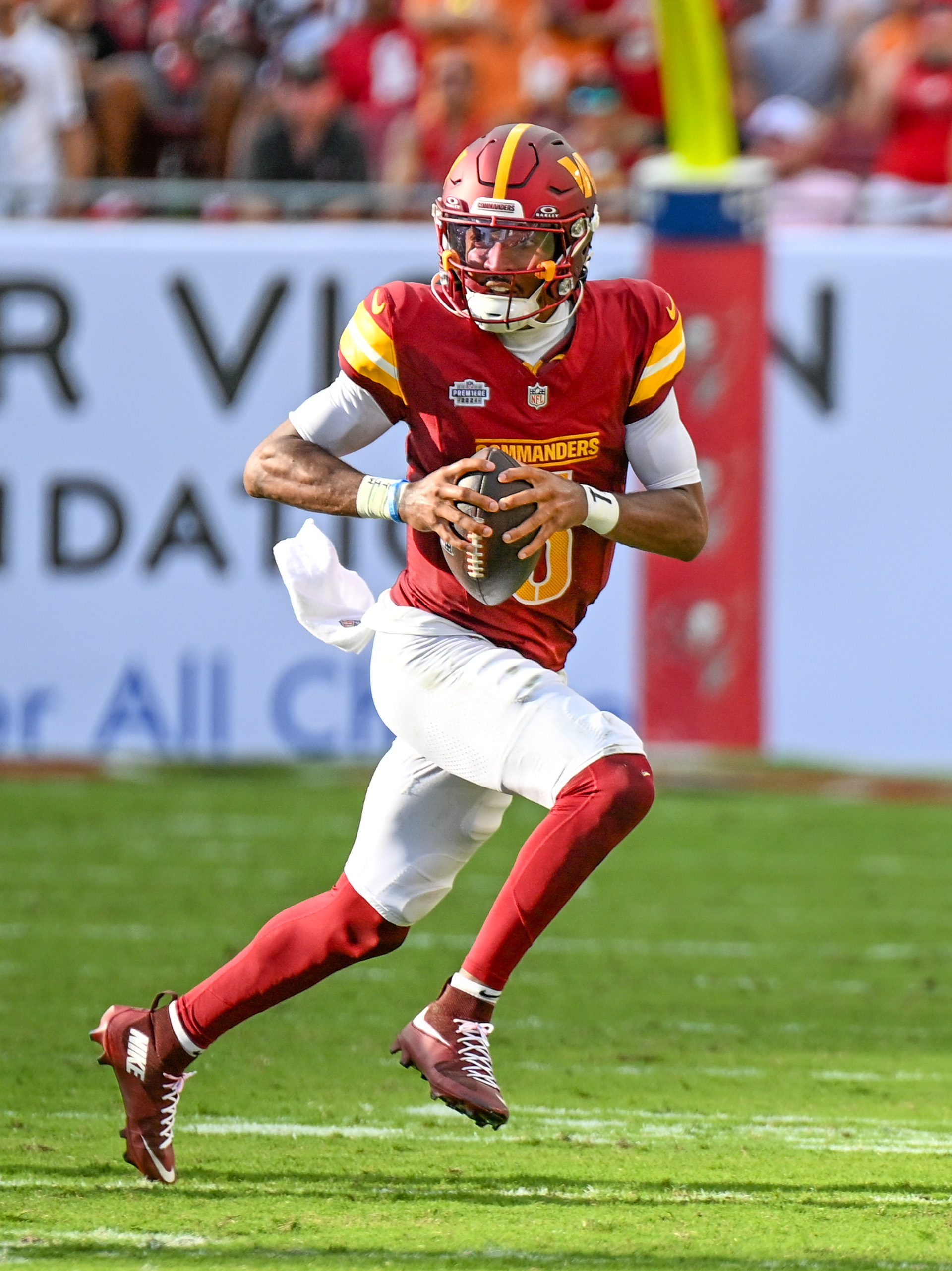
The Commanders selected quarterback Jayden Daniels second overall in the 2024 draft. He set the record for most rushing yards by a rookie quarterback in NFL history and was named Offensive Rookie of the Year.

Coaching changes included former Texas Tech Red Raiders and Arizona Cardinals head coach Kliff Kingsbury as offensive coordinator, Cowboys secondary coach Joe Whitt Jr. as defensive coordinator, and former Seattle Seahawks special teams coordinator Larry Izzo in the same role. Offensive additions included assistant head coach and pass game coordinator Brian Johnson, run game coordinator Anthony Lynn, assistant quarterbacks coach David Blough, tight ends coach David Raih, offensive line coaches Bobby Johnson and Darnell Stapleton, with quarterbacks coach Tavita Pritchard and wide receivers coach Bobby Engram being the only holdovers. Defensive additions included pass game coordinator Jason Simmons, defensive line coaches Darryl Tapp and Sharrif Floyd, linebackers coach Ken Norton Jr., defensive back coaches Tommy Donatell and William Gay, and senior assistant John Pagano, with assistant linebackers and pass rush specialist coach Ryan Kerrigan being the only holdover.

The team's roster also saw major turnover, with the Commanders having the lowest amount of returning players from 2023 after signing a league-high 26 free agents. The team traded previous season's starting quarterback Sam Howell to the Seattle Seahawks and 2022 first-round wide receiver Jahan Dotson to the Philadelphia Eagles for mid-round draft picks. Notable acquisitions included quarterback Marcus Mariota, running backs Austin Ekeler and Jeremy McNichols, tight end Zach Ertz, wide receivers Olamide Zaccheaus and Noah Brown, guard Nick Allegretti, center Tyler Biadasz, linebackers Bobby Wagner and Frankie Luvu, defensive ends Dorance Armstrong, Clelin Ferrell, and Dante Fowler, cornerback Noah Igbinoghene, safety Jeremy Chinn, special teamer Nick Bellore, long snapper Tyler Ott, and kicker Austin Seibert. The Commanders selected quarterback Jayden Daniels in the 2024 draft with the second overall pick, with later selections including defensive tackle Johnny Newton, cornerback Mike Sainristil, and offensive tackle Brandon Coleman. Notable undrafted free agents included quarterback Sam Hartman, tight end Colson Yankoff, and safety Tyler Owens. At the trade deadline in early November, the Commanders acquired cornerback Marshon Lattimore from the New Orleans Saints in exchange for third-, fourth- and sixth-round picks in the 2025 NFL draft.

The Commanders finished the regular season with a record of 12–5, their highest win total since 1991 and the largest improvement by wins over two seasons in team history. The team's offense under Daniels ranked among the franchise best, tying for the second-most total points in a season (485) and ranking top three in rushing and total yards. The team was nicknamed the "Cardiac Commanders" for winning numerous games of close contention in their final seconds. Daniels would be named the Offensive Rookie of the Year, while McLaurin, linebackers Frankie Luvu and Bobby Wagner, and kick returner Austin Ekeler, were named second-team All-Pros.

== Draft ==
Player selections and trades
| Round | Pick | Player | Position | College | Notes |
|---|---|---|---|---|---|
| 1 | 2 | Jayden Daniels | Quarterback | LSU | |
| 2 | 36 | Johnny Newton | Defensive tackle | Illinois | |
| 2 | 40 | Traded to the Philadelphia Eagles (Note: The Commanders traded second-, third- and fifth-round selections (40th, 78th and 152nd overall) to the Philadelphia Eagles in exchange for two second-round and one fifth-round selection (50th, 53rd and 161st overall).) | | | From the Bears (Note: The Commanders traded DE Montez Sweat to the Chicago Bears in exchange for a second-round selection (40th overall).) |
| 2 | 50 | Mike Sainristil | Cornerback | Michigan | |
| 2 | 53 | Ben Sinnott | Tight end | Kansas State | |
| 3 | 67 | Brandon Coleman | Offensive tackle | TCU | |
| 3 | 78 | Traded to the Philadelphia Eagles | | | From the Seahawks (Note: The Commanders traded fourth- and sixth-round selections (102nd and 179th overall), and QB Sam Howell to the Seattle Seahawks in exchange for third- and fifth-round selections (78th and 152nd overall).) |
| 3 | 100 | Luke McCaffrey | Wide receiver | Rice | Resolution JC-2A selection; from the 49ers (Note: The Commanders traded DE Chase Young to the San Francisco 49ers in exchange for a third-round compensatory selection (100th overall).) |
| 4 | 102 | Traded to the Seattle Seahawks | | | |
| 5 | 139 | Jordan Magee | Linebacker | Temple | |
| 5 | 152 | Traded to the Philadelphia Eagles | | | From Seahawks |
| 5 | 161 | Dominique Hampton | Linebacker | Washington | |
| 6 | 179 | Traded to the Seattle Seahawks | | | |
| 7 | 222 | Javontae Jean-Baptiste | Defensive end | Notre Dame | |

Undrafted free agents
| Player | Position | College |
|---|---|---|
| Chigozie Anusiem | Cornerback | Colorado State |
| Sam Hartman | Quarterback | Notre Dame |
| Austin Jones | Running back | USC |
| Ben Nikkel | Safety | Iowa State |
| David Nwaogwugwu | Offensive tackle | Toledo |
| Tyler Owens | Safety | Texas Tech |
| Norell Pollard | Defensive tackle | Virginia Tech |
| Marcus Rosemy-Jacksaint | Wide receiver | Georgia |
| Michael Wiley | Running back | Arizona |
| A. J. Woods | Cornerback | Pittsburgh |
| Colson Yankoff | Tight end | UCLA |

== Staff ==
2024 Washington Commanders staff
| Front office: Managing partner – Josh Harris; Limited partners – Mitchell Rales, Magic Johnson, Mark Ein; General manager – Adam Peters; Assistant general manager – Lance Newmark; Senior vice president of football operations – Brandon Sosna; Senior personnel executive – Martin Mayhew; Senior advisors – Doug Williams, Jason Wright; Vice president of football administration – Rob Rogers; Director of player personnel – David Blackburn; Personnel executive – Scott Fitterer; Director of college scouting – Tim Gribble; Director of pro scouting – Chris White; Scouts – Dwaune Jones, Paul Skansi; Advisor – Marty Hurney; Special advisor – Bob Myers; Head coaches: Head coach – Dan Quinn; Assistant head coach/offensive pass game coordinator – Brian Johnson; Offensive coaches: Offensive coordinator – Kliff Kingsbury; Run game coordinator/running backs – Anthony Lynn; Quarterbacks – Tavita Pritchard; Assistant quarterbacks – David Blough; Wide receivers – Bobby Engram; Tight ends – David Raih; Offensive line – Bobby Johnson; Assistant offensive line – Darnell Stapleton; Offensive assistant – Andre Coleman; Offensive quality control – Shane Toub | Defensive coaches: Defensive coordinator – Joe Whitt Jr.; Defensive pass game coordinator – Jason Simmons; Defensive line – Darryl Tapp; Assistant defensive line – Sharrif Floyd; Linebackers – Ken Norton Jr.; Assistant linebackers/pass rush specialist – Ryan Kerrigan; Defensive backs – Tommy Donatell; Assistant defensive backs – William Gay; Senior defensive assistant – John Pagano; Defensive quality control – George Banko; Special teams coaches: Special teams coordinator – Larry Izzo; Assistant special teams – John Glenn; Support staff and coaches: Senior vice president of football initiatives – Dave Gardi; Senior director of team support and advancement – Dylan Thompson; Senior director of player health and performance – Tim McGrath; Director of player performance – Brett Nenaber; Head strength and conditioning – Chad Englehart; Head athletic trainer – Al Bellamy; Coaching chief of staff – Sarah Hogan; Player development – Pete Ohnegian |

== Final roster ==
2024 Washington Commanders roster
| Quarterbacks (QB): 5 Jayden Daniels; 16 Jeff Driskel; 18 Marcus Mariota; Running backs (RB): 30 Austin Ekeler; 26 Jeremy McNichols; 8 Brian Robinson Jr.; 36 Chris Rodriguez Jr.; Wide receivers (WR): 2 Dyami Brown; 80 Jamison Crowder; 12 Luke McCaffrey; 17 Terry McLaurin; 13 K. J. Osborn; 14 Olamide Zaccheaus; Tight ends (TE): 87 John Bates; 86 Zach Ertz; 82 Ben Sinnott; 41 Colson Yankoff | Offensive linemen (OL): 67 Nick Allegretti LG; 63 Tyler Biadasz C; 74 Brandon Coleman LT; 76 Sam Cosmi RG; 60 Michael Deiter C; 78 Cornelius Lucas LT; 75 Chris Paul G; 73 Trent Scott RT; 71 Andrew Wylie RT; Defensive linemen (DL): 93 Jonathan Allen DT; 92 Dorance Armstrong DE; 64 Sheldon Day DT; 99 Clelin Ferrell DE; 6 Dante Fowler DE; 96 Jalyn Holmes DE; 90 Javontae Jean-Baptiste DE; 95 Jer'Zhan Newton DT; 94 Daron Payne DT | Linebackers (LB): 57 Nick Bellore OLB; 45 Dominique Hampton OLB; 4 Frankie Luvu OLB; 54 Bobby Wagner MLB; 32 Mykal Walker OLB; Defensive backs (DB): 35 Percy Butler FS; 11 Jeremy Chinn SS; 24 Michael Davis CB; 22 Darrick Forrest SS; 1 Noah Igbinoghene CB; 23 Marshon Lattimore CB; 20 Quan Martin FS; 39 Jeremy Reaves FS; 0 Mike Sainristil CB; 25 Benjamin St-Juste CB; Special teams (ST): 47 Zane Gonzalez K; 69 Tyler Ott LS; 10 Tress Way P | Practice squad: 91 Carl Davis DT; 72 Viliami Fehoko DT; 61 Julian Good-Jones G; 51 Bobby Hart RT; 15 Sam Hartman QB; 83 Tyree Jackson TE; 50 Andre Jones Jr. DE; 19 Chris Moore WR; 48 Ben Nikkel SS; 97 Efe Obada DE; 68 Max Pircher T (IPP); 37 Bobby Price CB; 38 Kevon Seymour CB; 84 Mitchell Tinsley WR; 89 Brycen Tremayne WR; 88 Cole Turner TE; 34 Michael Wiley RB; Reserve: 31 Kazmeir Allen RB (IR); 85 Noah Brown WR (IR); -- Lawrence Cager TE (Futures); -- Anim Dankwah T (Futures); -- Demetric Felton RB (Futures); -- Allan George CB (Futures); 58 Jordan Magee MLB (IR); 68 Haggai Ndubuisi DT (IR); 40 Tyler Owens SS (IR); 96 Norell Pollard DT (IR); 3 Austin Seibert K (IR); -- Mike Strachan WR (Futures); Rookies in italics |

== Standings ==
=== Division ===
NFC East
| | W | L | T | PCT | DIV | CONF | PF | PA | STK |
|---|---|---|---|---|---|---|---|---|---|
| ^{(2)} Philadelphia Eagles | 14 | 3 | 0 | .824 | 5–1 | 9–3 | 463 | 303 | W2 |
| ^{(6)} Washington Commanders | 12 | 5 | 0 | .706 | 4–2 | 9–3 | 485 | 391 | W5 |
| Dallas Cowboys | 7 | 10 | 0 | .412 | 3–3 | 5–7 | 350 | 468 | L2 |
| New York Giants | 3 | 14 | 0 | .176 | 0–6 | 1–11 | 273 | 415 | L1 |

=== Conference ===
NFC
| Seed | Team | Division | W | L | T | PCT | DIV | CONF | SOS | SOV | STK |
|---|---|---|---|---|---|---|---|---|---|---|---|
Division leaders
| 1 | Detroit Lions | North | 15 | 2 | 0 | .882 | 6–0 | 11–1 | .516 | .494 | W3 |
| 2 | Philadelphia Eagles | East | 14 | 3 | 0 | .824 | 5–1 | 9–3 | .453 | .424 | W2 |
| 3 (Note: Tampa Bay clinched the #3 seed over Los Angeles based on conference record. (Tampa Bay 8–4 to Los Angeles 6–6)) | Tampa Bay Buccaneers | South | 10 | 7 | 0 | .588 | 4–2 | 8–4 | .502 | .465 | W2 |
| 4 (Note: Los Angeles clinched the NFC West and #4 seed over Seattle based on strength of victory. (Los Angeles .441 to Seattle .424)) | Los Angeles Rams | West | 10 | 7 | 0 | .588 | 4–2 | 6–6 | .505 | .441 | L1 |
Wild cards
| 5 | Minnesota Vikings | North | 14 | 3 | 0 | .824 | 4–2 | 9–3 | .474 | .408 | L1 |
| 6 | Washington Commanders | East | 12 | 5 | 0 | .706 | 4–2 | 9–3 | .436 | .358 | W5 |
| 7 | Green Bay Packers | North | 11 | 6 | 0 | .647 | 1–5 | 6–6 | .533 | .412 | L2 |
Did not qualify for the postseason
| 8 | Seattle Seahawks | West | 10 | 7 | 0 | .588 | 4–2 | 6–6 | .498 | .424 | W2 |
| 9 (Note: Atlanta finished ahead of Arizona based on conference record. (Atlanta 7–5 to Arizona 4–8)) | Atlanta Falcons | South | 8 | 9 | 0 | .471 | 4–2 | 7–5 | .519 | .426 | L2 |
| 10 | Arizona Cardinals | West | 8 | 9 | 0 | .471 | 3–3 | 4–8 | .536 | .404 | W1 |
| 11 | Dallas Cowboys | East | 7 | 10 | 0 | .412 | 3–3 | 5–7 | .522 | .387 | L2 |
| 12 | San Francisco 49ers | West | 6 | 11 | 0 | .353 | 1–5 | 4–8 | .564 | .402 | L4 |
| 13 (Note: Chicago finished ahead of Carolina based on head-to-head victory.) | Chicago Bears | North | 5 | 12 | 0 | .294 | 1–5 | 3–9 | .554 | .388 | W1 |
| 14 (Note: Carolina finished ahead of New Orleans based on strength of victory. (Carolina .329 to New Orleans .306)) | Carolina Panthers | South | 5 | 12 | 0 | .294 | 2–4 | 4–8 | .498 | .329 | W1 |
| 15 | New Orleans Saints | South | 5 | 12 | 0 | .294 | 2–4 | 4–8 | .505 | .306 | L4 |
| 16 | New York Giants | East | 3 | 14 | 0 | .176 | 0–6 | 1–11 | .554 | .412 | L1 |
Tiebreakers (Note: When breaking ties for three or more teams under the NFL's rules, they are first broken within divisions, then comparing only the highest ranked remaining team from each division.)

== Schedule ==
=== Preseason ===
| Week | Date | Opponent | Result | Record | Venue | Recap |
|---|---|---|---|---|---|---|
| 1 | August 10 | at New York Jets | L 17–20 | 0–1 | MetLife Stadium | Recap |
| 2 | August 17 | at Miami Dolphins | L 6–13 | 0–2 | Hard Rock Stadium | Recap |
| 3 | August 25 | New England Patriots | W 20–10 | 1–2 | Commanders Field | Recap |

=== Regular season ===
| Week | Date | Opponent | Result | Record | Venue | Recap |
|---|---|---|---|---|---|---|
| 1 | September 8 | at Tampa Bay Buccaneers | L 20–37 | 0–1 | Raymond James Stadium | Recap |
| 2 | September 15 | New York Giants | W 21–18 | 1–1 | Northwest Stadium | Recap |
| 3 | September 23 | at Cincinnati Bengals | W 38–33 | 2–1 | Paycor Stadium | Recap |
| 4 | September 29 | at Arizona Cardinals | W 42–14 | 3–1 | State Farm Stadium | Recap |
| 5 | October 6 | Cleveland Browns | W 34–13 | 4–1 | Northwest Stadium | Recap |
| 6 | October 13 | at Baltimore Ravens | L 23–30 | 4–2 | M&T Bank Stadium | Recap |
| 7 | October 20 | Carolina Panthers | W 40–7 | 5–2 | Northwest Stadium | Recap |
| 8 | October 27 | Chicago Bears | W 18–15 | 6–2 | Northwest Stadium | Recap |
| 9 | November 3 | at New York Giants | W 27–22 | 7–2 | MetLife Stadium | Recap |
| 10 | November 10 | Pittsburgh Steelers | L 27–28 | 7–3 | Northwest Stadium | Recap |
| 11 | November 14 | at Philadelphia Eagles | L 18–26 | 7–4 | Lincoln Financial Field | Recap |
| 12 | November 24 | Dallas Cowboys | L 26–34 | 7–5 | Northwest Stadium | Recap |
| 13 | December 1 | Tennessee Titans | W 42–19 | 8–5 | Northwest Stadium | Recap |
| 14 | Bye | | | | | |
| 15 | December 15 | at New Orleans Saints | W 20–19 | 9–5 | Caesars Superdome | Recap |
| 16 | December 22 | Philadelphia Eagles | W 36–33 | 10–5 | Northwest Stadium | Recap |
| 17 | December 29 | Atlanta Falcons | W 30–24 (OT) | 11–5 | Northwest Stadium | Recap |
| 18 | January 5 | at Dallas Cowboys | W 23–19 | 12–5 | AT&T Stadium | Recap |

=== Postseason ===
| Week | Date | Opponent (seed) | Result | Record | Venue | Recap |
|---|---|---|---|---|---|---|
| Wild Card | January 12 | at Tampa Bay Buccaneers (3) | W 23–20 | 1–0 | Raymond James Stadium | Recap |
| Divisional | January 18 | at Detroit Lions (1) | W 45–31 | 2–0 | Ford Field | Recap |
| NFC Championship | January 26 | at Philadelphia Eagles (2) | L 23–55 | 2–1 | Lincoln Financial Field | Recap |

== Game summaries ==
=== Week 1: at Tampa Bay Buccaneers ===
Week 1: at Tampa Bay Buccaneers

| Quarter | 1 | 2 | 3 | 4 | Total |
|---|---|---|---|---|---|
| Commanders | 0 | 7 | 7 | 6 | 20 |
| Buccaneers | 6 | 10 | 7 | 14 | 37 |

at Raymond James Stadium, Tampa, Florida

- Date: September 8
- Game time: 4:25 pm EDT
- Game weather: Cloudy, 93 °F (34 °C)
- Game attendance: 63,020
- Referee: Bill Vinovich
- TV announcers (Fox): Kevin Kugler, Daryl Johnston, and Laura Okmin
- Recap, Game Book

Game information

First quarter

- TB – Chase McLaughlin 56-yard field goal, 11:34. Buccaneers 3–0. Drive: 7 plays, 32 yards, 3:26.
- TB – Chase McLaughlin 34-yard field goal, 5:08. Buccaneers 6–0. Drive: 9 plays, 46 yards, 4:22.

Second quarter

- TB – Mike Evans 17-yard pass from Baker Mayfield (Chase McLaughlin kick), 10:53. Buccaneers 13–0. Drive: 8 plays, 63 yards, 4:23.
- WAS – Brian Robinson Jr. 7-yard run (Cade York kick), 7:17. Buccaneers 13–7. Drive: 8 plays, 74 yards, 3:36.
- TB – Chase McLaughlin 29-yard field goal, 0:16. Buccaneers 16–7. Drive: 13 plays, 49 yards, 7:01.

Third quarter

- TB – Chris Godwin 4-yard pass from Baker Mayfield (Chase McLaughlin kick), 7:11. Buccaneers 23–7. Drive: 5 plays, 54 yards, 2:10.
- WAS – Jayden Daniels 1-yard run (Cade York kick), 1:52. Buccaneers 23–14. Drive: 6 plays, 60 yards, 2:56.

Fourth quarter

- TB – Jalen McMillan 32-yard pass from Baker Mayfield (Chase McLaughlin kick), 14:55. Buccaneers 30–14. Drive: 5 plays, 72 yards, 1:57.
- TB – Mike Evans 1-yard pass from Baker Mayfield (Chase McLaughlin kick), 3:29. Buccaneers 37–14. Drive: 12 plays, 91 yards, 7:38.
- WAS – Jayden Daniels 1-yard run (pass failed), 1:12. Buccaneers 37–20. Drive: 10 plays, 70 yards, 2:17.

Top passers

- WAS – Jayden Daniels – 17/24, 184 yards
- TB – Baker Mayfield – 24/30, 289 yards, 4 TD

Top rushers

- WAS – Jayden Daniels – 16 rushes, 88 yards, 2 TD
- TB – Bucky Irving – 9 rushes, 62 yards

Top receivers

- WAS – Austin Ekeler – 4 receptions, 52 yards
- TB – Chris Godwin – 8 receptions, 83 yards, TD

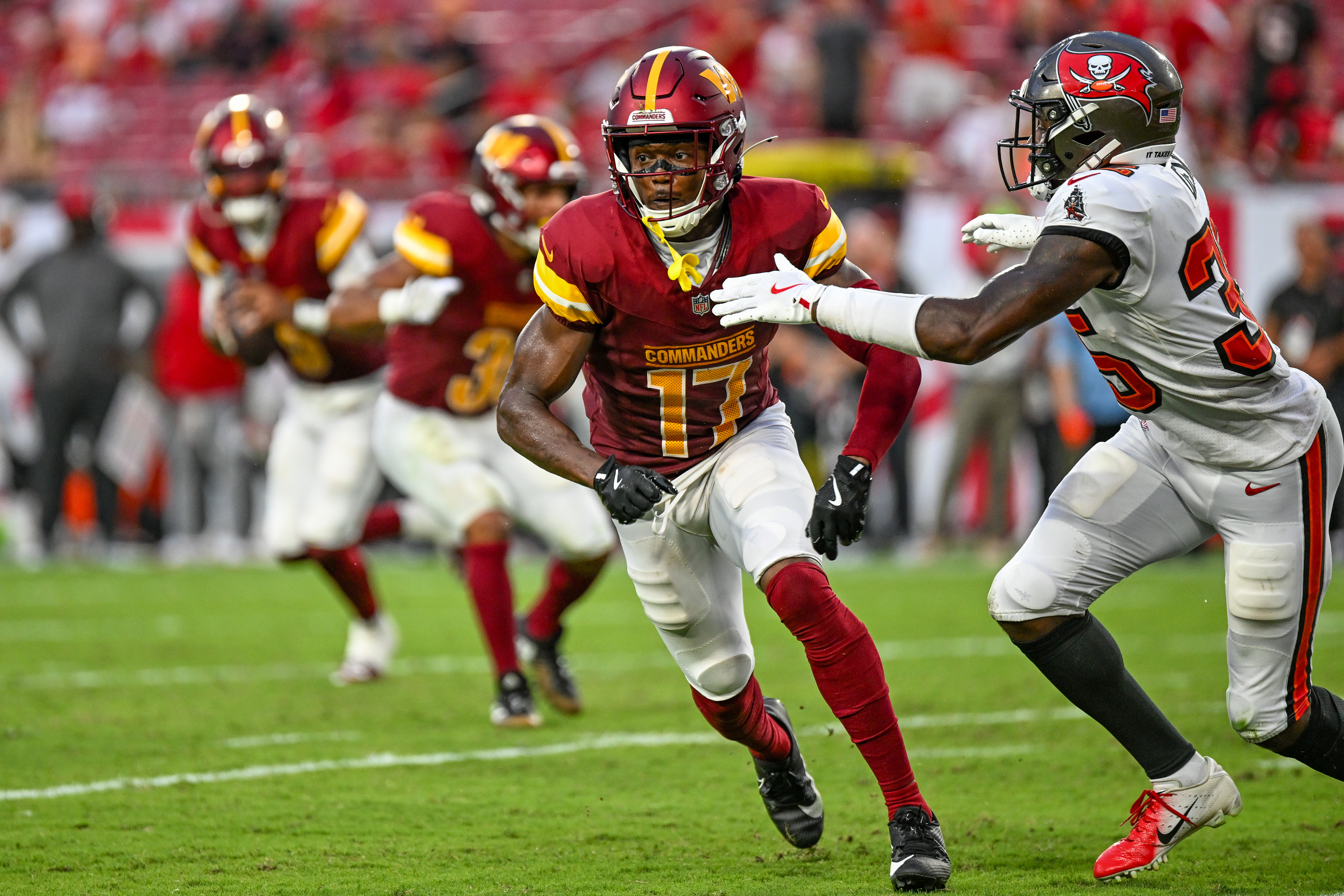
Terry McLaurin (17) in the opening game of the season against the Tampa Bay Buccaneers

Wide receiver Terry McLaurin, defensive end Clelin Ferrell and safety Jeremy Reaves served as game captains. Rookie quarterback (QB) Jayden Daniels scored two goal line rushing touchdowns and gained 272 total yards, becoming the first quarterback in NFL history to rush for 80 yards with two touchdowns in his debut. The teams would meet again in the Wild Card playoff.

=== Week 2: vs. New York Giants ===
Week 2: vs. New York Giants

| Quarter | 1 | 2 | 3 | 4 | Total |
|---|---|---|---|---|---|
| Giants | 6 | 6 | 0 | 6 | 18 |
| Commanders | 3 | 6 | 6 | 6 | 21 |

at Northwest Stadium, Landover, Maryland

- Date: September 15
- Game time: 1:00 pm EDT
- Game weather: Sunny, 82 °F (28 °C)
- Game attendance: 61,841
- Referee: Scott Novak
- TV announcers (Fox): Chris Myers, Mark Schlereth, and Jen Hale
- Recap, Game Book

Game information

First quarter

- WAS – Austin Seibert 27-yard field goal, 5:24. Commanders 3–0. Drive: 16 plays, 64 yards, 9:36.
- NYG – Devin Singletary 7-yard run (kick failed, wide right), 1:06. Giants 6–3. Drive: 7 plays, 53 yards, 4:18.

Second quarter

- WAS – Austin Seibert 45-yard field goal, 10:37. Tied 6–6. Drive: 10 plays, 43 yards, 5:29.
- WAS – Austin Seibert 26-yard field goal, 1:50. Commanders 9–6. Drive: 14 plays, 74 yards, 6:26.
- NYG – Malik Nabers 4-yard pass from Daniel Jones (pass failed), 0:08. Giants 12–9. Drive: 10 plays, 69 yards, 1:42.

Third quarter

- WAS – Austin Seibert 27-yard field goal, 7:58. Tied 12–12. Drive: 9 plays, 56 yards, 4:51.
- WAS – Austin Seibert 29-yard field goal, 2:47. Commanders 15–12. Drive: 9 plays, 59 yards, 4:38.

Fourth quarter

- NYG – Wan'Dale Robinson 7-yard pass from Daniel Jones (pass failed), 11:32. Giants 18–15. Drive: 13 plays, 70 yards, 6:15.
- WAS – Austin Seibert 33-yard field goal, 7:12. Tied 18–18. Drive: 9 plays, 45 yards, 4:20.
- WAS – Austin Seibert 30-yard field goal, 0:00. Commanders 21–18. Drive: 8 plays, 65 yards, 2:04.

Top passers

- NYG – Daniel Jones – 16/28, 178 yards, 2 TD
- WAS – Jayden Daniels – 23/29, 226 yards

Top rushers

- NYG – Devin Singletary – 16 rushes, 95 yards, TD
- WAS – Brian Robinson Jr. – 17 rushes, 133 yards

Top receivers

- NYG – Malik Nabers – 10 receptions, 127 yards, TD
- WAS – Zach Ertz – 4 receptions, 62 yards

Center Tyler Biadasz, linebacker Frankie Luvu and safety Percy Butler served as game captains. Kicker Austin Seibert, who replaced Cade York earlier in the week, was named NFC Special Teams Player of the Week after accounting for all of the team's points with a franchise-record seven field goals. The game marked Washington's first win without scoring a touchdown since 2009 as the team snapped a four-game winless streak against the Giants. The Commanders also became the first team since the 1989 Minnesota Vikings to win a game despite allowing three touchdowns and scoring none, and the first to do so in regulation.

=== Week 3: at Cincinnati Bengals ===
Week 3: at Cincinnati Bengals

| Quarter | 1 | 2 | 3 | 4 | Total |
|---|---|---|---|---|---|
| Commanders | 7 | 14 | 7 | 10 | 38 |
| Bengals | 7 | 6 | 7 | 13 | 33 |

at Paycor Stadium, Cincinnati, Ohio

- Date: September 23
- Game time: 8:15 pm EDT
- Game weather: Cloudy, 69 °F (21 °C)
- Game attendance: 66,207
- Referee: Brad Allen
- TV announcers (ABC): Joe Buck, Troy Aikman, and Lisa Salters
- Recap, Game Book

Game information

First quarter

- CIN – Ja'Marr Chase 41-yard pass from Joe Burrow (Evan McPherson kick), 11:37. Bengals 7–0. Drive: 6 plays, 71 yards, 3:23.
- WAS – Brian Robinson Jr. 1-yard run (Austin Seibert kick), 5:25. Tied 7–7. Drive: 10 plays, 70 yards, 6:12.

Second quarter

- WAS – Austin Ekeler 24-yard run (Austin Seibert kick), 11:31. Commanders 14–7. Drive: 7 plays, 62 yards, 3:20.
- CIN – Evan McPherson 28-yard field goal, 5:25. Commanders 14–10. Drive: 11 plays, 61 yards, 6:06.
- WAS – Jayden Daniels 4-yard run (Austin Seibert kick), 2:04. Commanders 21–10. Drive: 6 plays, 75 yards, 3:21.
- CIN – Evan McPherson 31-yard field goal, 0:22. Commanders 21–13. Drive: 9 plays, 57 yards, 1:42.

Third quarter

- WAS – Trent Scott 1-yard pass from Jayden Daniels (Austin Seibert kick), 9:54. Commanders 28–13. Drive: 9 plays, 33 yards, 5:06.
- CIN – Andrei Iosivas 2-yard pass from Joe Burrow (Evan McPherson kick), 3:03. Commanders 28–20. Drive: 13 plays, 78 yards, 6:51.

Fourth quarter

- WAS – Austin Seibert 42-yard field goal, 11:30. Commanders 31–20. Drive: 12 plays, 46 yards, 6:33.
- CIN – Ja'Marr Chase 31-yard pass from Joe Burrow (pass failed), 9:42. Commanders 31–26. Drive: 5 plays, 70 yards, 1:48.
- WAS – Terry McLaurin 27-yard pass from Jayden Daniels (Austin Seibert kick), 2:10. Commanders 38–26. Drive: 12 plays, 70 yards, 7:32.
- CIN – Zack Moss 1-yard run (Evan McPherson kick), 0:40. Commanders 38–33. Drive: 8 plays, 70 yards, 1:30.

Top passers

- WAS – Jayden Daniels – 21/23, 254 yards, 2 TD
- CIN – Joe Burrow – 29/38, 324 yards, 3 TD

Top rushers

- WAS – Jayden Daniels – 12 rushes, 39 yards, TD
- CIN – Chase Brown – 7 rushes, 62 yards

Top receivers

- WAS – Terry McLaurin – 4 receptions, 100 yards, TD
- CIN – Ja'Marr Chase – 6 receptions, 118 yards, 2 TD

On Monday Night Football, wide receiver Olamide Zaccheaus, linebacker Bobby Wagner and punter Tress Way served as game captains. Quarterback Jayden Daniels set an NFL rookie and Commanders team record with a 91.3% completion percentage on 23 attempts along with 293 total yards and three touchdowns, including his first one passing. He was named NFC Offensive Player of the Week for his performance, being the first Commanders player to earn it since Adrian Peterson in 2018. It was the Commanders' second consecutive game scoring on every drive, the first NFL team to do so since 2000, and the first game without any turnovers or punts by either team since 1940. Trent Scott also became the team's first offensive lineman to catch a touchdown pass since Joe Jacoby in 1984.

=== Week 4: at Arizona Cardinals ===
Week 4: at Arizona Cardinals

| Quarter | 1 | 2 | 3 | 4 | Total |
|---|---|---|---|---|---|
| Commanders | 7 | 10 | 10 | 15 | 42 |
| Cardinals | 7 | 0 | 7 | 0 | 14 |

at State Farm Stadium, Glendale, Arizona

- Date: September 29
- Game time: 4:05 pm EDT/1:05 pm MST
- Game weather: None (retractable roof closed)
- Game attendance: 63,286
- Referee: Craig Wrolstad
- TV announcers (Fox): Chris Myers, Mark Schlereth, and Jen Hale
- Recap, Game Book

Game information

First quarter

- ARI – Marvin Harrison Jr. 2-yard pass from Kyler Murray (Matt Prater kick), 9:54. Cardinals 7–0. Drive: 9 plays, 55 yards, 5:06.
- WAS – Brian Robinson Jr. 6-yard run (Austin Seibert kick), 5:13. Tied 7–7. Drive: 9 plays, 70 yards, 4:41.

Second quarter

- WAS – Jeremy McNichols 27-yard run (Austin Seibert kick), 10:18. Commanders 14–7. Drive: 13 plays, 93 yards, 7:21.
- WAS – Austin Seibert 45-yard field goal, 0:00. Commanders 17–7. Drive: 5 plays, 31 yards, 0:29.

Third quarter

- WAS – Jayden Daniels 9-yard run (Austin Seibert kick), 13:52. Commanders 24–7. Drive: 3 plays, 70 yards, 1:08.
- WAS – Austin Seibert 38-yard field goal, 5:16. Commanders 27–7. Drive: 11 plays, 41 yards, 6:37.
- ARI – James Conner 6-yard run (Matt Prater kick), 0:11. Commanders 27–14. Drive: 11 plays, 74 yards, 5:05.

Fourth quarter

- WAS – Terry McLaurin 10-yard pass from Jayden Daniels (Jayden Daniels–Zach Ertz pass), 8:30. Commanders 35–14. Drive: 12 plays, 70 yards, 6:41.
- WAS – Jeremy McNichols 7-yard run (Austin Seibert kick), 4:30. Commanders 42–14. Drive: 8 plays, 76 yards, 2:41.

Top passers

- WAS – Jayden Daniels – 26/30, 233 yards, TD, INT
- ARI – Kyler Murray – 16/22, 142 yards, TD

Top rushers

- WAS – Brian Robinson Jr. – 21 rushes, 101 yards, TD
- ARI – James Conner – 18 rushes, 104 yards, TD

Top receivers

- WAS – Olamide Zaccheaus – 6 receptions, 85 yards
- ARI – Marvin Harrison Jr. – 5 receptions, 45 yards, TD

Running back Jeremy McNichols, guard Nick Allegretti and safety Quan Martin served as game captains. 42 points were the most the Commanders had scored in a game since 2016 and was the first time scoring 38 or more in consecutive games since 1991. QB Jayden Daniels set a record for having the highest completion percentage (82.1) over a four game span in NFL history and became the first to complete at least 85 percent of his passes in consecutive games. Daniels was also named NFL Offensive Rookie of the Month for September, being the first player for the team to win it since Robert Griffin III in 2012. With 15 tackles, linebacker Bobby Wagner moved into fourth place on the career tackles list.

=== Week 5: vs. Cleveland Browns ===
Week 5: vs. Cleveland Browns

| Quarter | 1 | 2 | 3 | 4 | Total |
|---|---|---|---|---|---|
| Browns | 0 | 3 | 3 | 7 | 13 |
| Commanders | 7 | 17 | 10 | 0 | 34 |

at Northwest Stadium, Landover, Maryland

- Date: October 6
- Game time: 1:00 pm EDT
- Game weather: Sunny, 73 °F (23 °C)
- Game attendance: 59,030
- Referee: Alan Eck
- TV announcers (Fox): Jason Benetti, Greg Olsen, and Pam Oliver
- Recap, Game Book

Game information

First quarter

- WAS – Brian Robinson Jr. 4-yard run (Austin Seibert kick), 2:40. Commanders 7–0. Drive: 6 plays, 34 yards, 3:25.

Second quarter

- CLE – Dustin Hopkins 51-yard field goal, 13:08. Commanders 7–3. Drive: 6 plays, 10 yards, 1:52.
- WAS – Austin Seibert 27-yard field goal, 8:41. Commanders 10–3. Drive: 8 plays, 71 yards, 4:27.
- WAS – Brian Robinson Jr. 1-yard run (Austin Seibert kick), 3:11. Commanders 17–3. Drive: 10 plays, 74 yards, 3:37.
- WAS – Dyami Brown 41-yard pass from Jayden Daniels (Austin Seibert kick), 0:36. Commanders 24–3. Drive: 5 plays, 62 yards, 0:59.

Third quarter

- CLE – Dustin Hopkins 31-yard field goal, 12:12. Commanders 24–6. Drive: 6 plays, 17 yards, 2:40.
- WAS – Jeremy McNichols 3-yard run (Austin Seibert kick), 7:23. Commanders 31–6. Drive: 9 plays, 80 yards, 4:49.
- WAS – Austin Seibert 30-yard field goal, 2:35. Commanders 34–6. Drive: 7 plays, 38 yards, 3:13.

Fourth quarter

- CLE – Jordan Akins 10-yard pass from Deshaun Watson (Dustin Hopkins kick), 7:02. Commanders 34–13. Drive: 9 plays, 54 yards, 4:49.

Top passers

- CLE – Deshaun Watson – 15/28, 125 yards, TD
- WAS – Jayden Daniels – 14/25, 238 yards, TD, INT

Top rushers

- CLE – Jerome Ford – 9 rushes, 47 yards
- WAS – Jayden Daniels – 11 rushes, 82 yards

Top receivers

- CLE – Amari Cooper – 4 receptions, 60 yards
- WAS – Terry McLaurin – 4 receptions, 112 yards

Quarterback Jayden Daniels, defensive end Dorance Armstrong and safety Jeremy Chinn served as game captains. The Commanders became the first NFL team since 1970 to score at least 150 points in their first five games with a rookie quarterback, with Jayden Daniels being the first to pass for more than 1,000 yards and rush for more than 250 during the same span. It was also their first time winning two consecutive games by at least 20 points since 1997, their first time scoring at least 30 points in three consecutive games since 2015 and their first time scoring three rushing touchdowns in three consecutive games in franchise history. Linebacker Frankie Luvu had 7 tackles, 2.5 sacks and a fumble recovery, with the defense having seven total sacks of Browns quarterback Deshaun Watson.

=== Week 6: at Baltimore Ravens ===
Week 6: at Baltimore Ravens

| Quarter | 1 | 2 | 3 | 4 | Total |
|---|---|---|---|---|---|
| Commanders | 3 | 7 | 3 | 10 | 23 |
| Ravens | 3 | 14 | 10 | 3 | 30 |

at M&T Bank Stadium, Baltimore, Maryland

- Date: October 13
- Game time: 1:00 pm EDT
- Game weather: Sunny, 75 °F (24 °C)
- Game attendance: 71,316
- Referee: Land Clark
- TV announcers (CBS): Jim Nantz, Tony Romo, and Tracy Wolfson
- Recap, Game Book

Game information

First quarter

- WAS – Austin Seibert 42-yard field goal, 9:11. Commanders 3–0. Drive: 7 plays, 25 yards, 3:36.
- BAL – Justin Tucker 45-yard field goal, 3:45. Tied 3–3. Drive: 10 plays, 43 yards, 5:26.

Second quarter

- BAL – Derrick Henry 3-yard run (Justin Tucker kick), 7:55. Ravens 10–3. Drive: 9 plays, 93 yards, 4:58.
- WAS – Terry McLaurin 7-yard pass from Jayden Daniels (Austin Seibert kick), 4:16. Tied 10–10. Drive: 8 plays, 70 yards, 3:39.
- BAL – Mark Andrews 13-yard pass from Lamar Jackson (Justin Tucker kick), 0:53. Ravens 17–10. Drive: 10 plays, 78 yards, 3:23.

Third quarter

- WAS – Austin Seibert 55-yard field goal, 12:45. Ravens 17–13. Drive: 6 plays, 33 yards, 2:15.
- BAL – Justin Tucker 32-yard field goal, 8:19. Ravens 20–13. Drive: 8 plays, 57 yards, 4:26.
- BAL – Derrick Henry 7-yard run (Justin Tucker kick), 2:08. Ravens 27–13. Drive: 8 plays, 94 yards, 4:42.

Fourth quarter

- WAS – Terry McLaurin 6-yard pass from Jayden Daniels (Austin Seibert kick), 12:12. Ravens 27–20. Drive: 12 plays, 70 yards, 4:56.
- BAL – Justin Tucker 39-yard field goal, 6:18. Ravens 30–20. Drive: 9 plays, 57 yards, 5:54.
- WAS – Austin Seibert 49-yard field goal, 2:48. Ravens 30–23. Drive: 8 plays, 40 yards, 3:30.

Top passers

- WAS – Jayden Daniels – 24/35, 269 yards, 2 TD
- BAL – Lamar Jackson – 20/26, 323 yards, TD, INT

Top rushers

- WAS – Jayden Daniels – 6 rushes, 22 yards
- BAL – Derrick Henry – 24 rushes, 132 yards, 2 TD

Top receivers

- WAS – Zach Ertz – 4 receptions, 68 yards
- BAL – Zay Flowers – 9 receptions, 132 yards

Tackle Andrew Wylie, defensive tackle Daron Payne and long snapper Tyler Ott served as game captains. Wide receiver Terry McLaurin caught two touchdowns, marking the first time in his career recording four touchdowns within four games. Rookie cornerback Mike Sainristil recorded his first career interception off Lamar Jackson, giving the Commanders their first of the season.

=== Week 7: vs. Carolina Panthers ===
Week 7: vs. Carolina Panthers

| Quarter | 1 | 2 | 3 | 4 | Total |
|---|---|---|---|---|---|
| Panthers | 0 | 0 | 0 | 7 | 7 |
| Commanders | 10 | 17 | 10 | 3 | 40 |

at Northwest Stadium, Landover, Maryland

- Date: October 20
- Game time: 4:05 pm EDT
- Game weather: Sunny, 76 °F (24 °C)
- Game attendance: 63,380
- Referee: Carl Cheffers
- TV announcers (CBS): Ian Eagle, Charles Davis, and Evan Washburn
- Recap, Game Book

Game information

First quarter

- WAS – Dante Fowler 67-yard interception return (Austin Seibert kick), 11:14. Commanders 7–0.
- WAS – Austin Seibert 23-yard field goal, 3:18. Commanders 10–0. Drive: 11 plays, 85 yards, 6:20.

Second quarter

- WAS – Brian Robinson Jr. 8-yard run (Austin Seibert kick), 11:35. Commanders 17–0. Drive: 4 plays, 59 yards, 1:47.
- WAS – Austin Seibert 49-yard field goal, 5:39. Commanders 20–0. Drive: 5 plays, 7 yards, 1:53.
- WAS – Zach Ertz 12-yard pass from Marcus Mariota (Austin Seibert kick), 0:10. Commanders 27–0. Drive: 8 plays, 92 yards, 2:12.

Third quarter

- WAS – Ben Sinnott 3-yard pass from Marcus Mariota (Austin Seibert kick), 8:53. Commanders 34–0. Drive: 10 plays, 59 yards, 6:07.
- WAS – Austin Seibert 31-yard field goal, 1:33. Commanders 37–0. Drive: 10 plays, 55 yards, 5:36.

Fourth quarter

- CAR – Chuba Hubbard 4-yard run (Eddy Piñeiro kick), 11:38. Commanders 37–7. Drive: 9 plays, 70 yards, 4:55.
- WAS – Austin Seibert 29-yard field goal, 4:55. Commanders 40–7. Drive: 12 plays, 59 yards, 6:43.

Top passers

- CAR – Andy Dalton – 11/16, 93 yards, 2 INT
- WAS – Marcus Mariota – 18/23, 205 yards, 2 TD

Top rushers

- CAR – Chuba Hubbard – 17 rushes, 52 yards, TD
- WAS – Brian Robinson Jr. – 12 rushes, 71 yards, TD

Top receivers

- CAR – Ja'Tavion Sanders – 6 receptions, 61 yards
- WAS – Terry McLaurin – 6 receptions, 98 yards

Guard Sam Cosmi and linebackers Frankie Luvu and Nick Bellore served as game captains. The Commanders surpassed their win total of 4 from 2023 with a 40–7 win over the Carolina Panthers, their largest margin of victory since 2015. Defensive end Dante Fowler returned an Andy Dalton interception 67 yards for a touchdown on the opening drive, the team's first defensive score of the season. Quarterback Jayden Daniels suffered a rib cartilage injury on his first drive and left the game, with backup Marcus Mariota going for 205 yards and two touchdowns. The game also served as alumni homecoming, with Pro Football Hall of Fame cornerback Darrell Green, who spent his entire 20-year career with Washington, having his No. 28 jersey retired at halftime.

=== Week 8: vs. Chicago Bears ===
Week 8: vs. Chicago Bears

| Quarter | 1 | 2 | 3 | 4 | Total |
|---|---|---|---|---|---|
| Bears | 0 | 0 | 7 | 8 | 15 |
| Commanders | 6 | 3 | 3 | 6 | 18 |

at Northwest Stadium, Landover, Maryland

- Date: October 27
- Game time: 4:25 pm EDT
- Game weather: Sunny, 58 °F (14 °C)
- Game attendance: 64,704
- Referee: Clete Blakeman
- TV announcers (CBS): Jim Nantz, Tony Romo, and Tracy Wolfson
- Recap, Game Book

Game information

First quarter

- WAS – Austin Seibert 27-yard field goal, 8:51. Commanders 3–0. Drive: 9 plays, 56 yards, 4:12.
- WAS – Austin Seibert 30-yard field goal, 1:04. Commanders 6–0. Drive: 12 plays, 79 yards, 4:59.

Second quarter

- WAS – Austin Seibert 28-yard field goal, 5:24. Commanders 9–0. Drive: 7 plays, 31 yards, 3:01.

Third quarter

- WAS – Austin Seibert 47-yard field goal, 5:48. Commanders 12–0. Drive: 7 plays, 12 yards, 3:50.
- CHI – D'Andre Swift 56-yard run (Cairo Santos kick), 0:43. Commanders 12–7. Drive: 2 plays, 59 yards, 0:46.

Fourth quarter

- CHI – Roschon Johnson 1-yard run (Caleb Williams–Cole Kmet pass), 0:23. Bears 15–12. Drive: 10 plays, 62 yards, 3:56.
- WAS – Noah Brown 52-yard pass from Jayden Daniels, 0:00. Commanders 18–15. Drive: 4 plays, 76 yards, 0:25.

Top passers

- CHI – Caleb Williams – 10/24, 131 yards
- WAS – Jayden Daniels – 21/38, 326 yards, TD

Top rushers

- CHI – D'Andre Swift – 18 rushes, 129 yards, TD
- WAS – Brian Robinson Jr. – 16 rushes, 65 yards

Top receivers

- CHI – Rome Odunze – 3 receptions, 41 yards
- WAS – Terry McLaurin – 5 receptions, 125 yards

Guard Nick Allegretti, and safeties Jeremy Chinn and Jeremy Reaves served as game captains. The game featured a play at the end of the game known as the Hail Maryland in which Jayden Daniels threw a 52-yard Hail Mary pass as time expired to wide receiver Noah Brown to win 18–15. The game also saw the Commanders record consecutive first half shutouts for the first time since 1997.

=== Week 9: at New York Giants ===
Week 9: at New York Giants

| Quarter | 1 | 2 | 3 | 4 | Total |
|---|---|---|---|---|---|
| Commanders | 7 | 14 | 3 | 3 | 27 |
| Giants | 0 | 7 | 3 | 12 | 22 |

at MetLife Stadium, East Rutherford, New Jersey

- Date: November 3
- Game time: 1:00 pm EST
- Game weather: Sunny, 52 °F (11 °C)
- Game attendance: 77,994
- Referee: Brad Allen
- TV announcers (Fox): Chris Myers, Mark Sanchez, and Kristina Pink
- Recap, Game Book

Game information

First quarter

- WAS – Terry McLaurin 1-yard pass from Jayden Daniels (Austin Seibert kick), 7:04. Commanders 7–0. Drive: 3 plays, 31 yards, 1:11.

Second quarter

- NYG – Chris Manhertz 2-yard pass from Daniel Jones (Jude McAtamney kick), 12:21. Tied 7–7. Drive: 16 plays, 73 yards, 9:43.
- WAS – Austin Ekeler 1-yard run (Austin Seibert kick), 6:21. Commanders 14–7. Drive: 11 plays, 70 yards, 6:00.
- WAS – Terry McLaurin 18-yard pass from Jayden Daniels (Austin Seibert kick), 0:06. Commanders 21–7. Drive: 12 plays, 87 yards, 5:13.

Third quarter

- NYG – Jude McAtamney 31-yard field goal, 5:27. Commanders 21–10. Drive: 15 plays, 66 yards, 8:37.
- WAS – Austin Seibert 31-yard field goal, 0:33. Commanders 24–10. Drive: 10 plays, 57 yards, 4:54.

Fourth quarter

- NYG – Daniel Jones 2-yard run (run failed), 9:25. Commanders 24–16. Drive: 13 plays, 80 yards, 6:08.
- WAS – Austin Seibert 20-yard field goal, 3:46. Commanders 27–16. Drive: 11 plays, 63 yards, 5:39.
- NYG – Theo Johnson 35-yard pass from Daniel Jones (pass failed), 2:48. Commanders 27–22. Drive: 4 plays, 74 yards, 0:58.

Top passers

- WAS – Jayden Daniels – 15/22, 209 yards, 2 TD
- NYG – Daniel Jones – 20/26, 174 yards, 2 TD

Top rushers

- WAS – Chris Rodriguez Jr. – 11 rushes, 52 yards
- NYG – Tyrone Tracy Jr. – 16 rushes, 66 yards

Top receivers

- WAS – Noah Brown – 5 receptions, 60 yards
- NYG – Malik Nabers – 9 receptions, 59 yards

Wide receiver Noah Brown, safety Quan Martin and tight end John Bates served as game captains. With the win, the Commanders swept the Giants for the first time since 2021. The Giants entered the game leading the NFL in quarterback sacks but failed to record any for the first time in the season. The win would also be Dan Quinn's 50th in his head coaching career.

=== Week 10: vs. Pittsburgh Steelers ===
Week 10: vs. Pittsburgh Steelers

| Quarter | 1 | 2 | 3 | 4 | Total |
|---|---|---|---|---|---|
| Steelers | 7 | 7 | 7 | 7 | 28 |
| Commanders | 7 | 10 | 10 | 0 | 27 |

at Northwest Stadium, Landover, Maryland

- Date: November 10
- Game time: 1:00 pm EST
- Game weather: Cloudy, 57 °F (14 °C)
- Game attendance: 66,192
- Referee: Brad Rogers
- TV announcers (CBS): Ian Eagle, Charles Davis, and Evan Washburn
- Recap, Game Book

Game information

First quarter

- PIT – George Pickens 16-yard pass from Russell Wilson (Chris Boswell kick), 8:33. Steelers 7–0. Drive: 7 plays, 70 yards, 2:52.
- WAS – Austin Ekeler 1-yard run (Zane Gonzalez kick), 3:44. Tied 7–7. Drive: 3 plays, 15 yards, 1:32.

Second quarter

- PIT – Pat Freiermuth 3-yard pass from Russell Wilson (Chris Boswell kick), 10:28. Steelers 14–7. Drive: 5 plays, 14 yards, 2:23.
- WAS – Zane Gonzalez 48-yard field goal, 8:11. Steelers 14–10. Drive: 6 plays, 40 yards, 2:17.
- WAS – Austin Ekeler 1-yard run (Zane Gonzalez kick), 0:16. Commanders 17–14. Drive: 15 plays, 94 yards, 5:23.

Third quarter

- WAS – Jeremy McNichols 1-yard run (Zane Gonzalez kick), 12:55. Commanders 24–14. Drive: 5 plays, 71 yards, 2:05.
- PIT – Najee Harris 1-yard run (Chris Boswell kick), 8:06. Commanders 24–21. Drive: 9 plays, 75 yards, 4:49.
- WAS – Zane Gonzalez 41-yard field goal, 2:51. Commanders 27–21. Drive: 7 plays, 19 yards, 2:51.

Fourth quarter

- PIT – Mike Williams 32-yard pass from Russell Wilson (Chris Boswell kick), 2:22. Steelers 28–27. Drive: 6 plays, 46 yards, 3:24.

Top passers

- PIT – Russell Wilson – 14/28, 195 yards, 3 TD, INT
- WAS – Jayden Daniels – 17/34, 202 yards

Top rushers

- PIT – Jaylen Warren – 14 rushes, 66 yards
- WAS – Austin Ekeler – 13 rushes, 44 yards, 2 TD

Top receivers

- PIT – George Pickens – 5 receptions, 91 yards, TD
- WAS – Terry McLaurin – 5 receptions, 113 yards

Wide receiver Terry McLaurin, linebacker Bobby Wagner and safety Percy Butler served as game captains. Zach Ertz surpassed Greg Olsen for sixth place in career tight end receptions while McLaurin surpassed Jerry Smith for sixth place in franchise receptions. Defensive end Dante Fowler had his second consecutive game with two sacks, becoming the first Washington player to record multiple sacks in consecutive games since Ryan Kerrigan in 2017.

=== Week 11: at Philadelphia Eagles ===
Week 11: at Philadelphia Eagles

| Quarter | 1 | 2 | 3 | 4 | Total |
|---|---|---|---|---|---|
| Commanders | 7 | 0 | 3 | 8 | 18 |
| Eagles | 0 | 3 | 3 | 20 | 26 |

at Lincoln Financial Field, Philadelphia, Pennsylvania

- Date: November 14
- Game time: 8:15 pm EST
- Game weather: Clear, 46 °F (8 °C)
- Game attendance: 69,879
- Referee: Adrian Hill
- TV announcers (WTTG/Prime Video): Al Michaels, Kirk Herbstreit, and Kaylee Hartung
- Recap, Game Book

Game information

First quarter

- WAS – Brian Robinson Jr. 1-yard run (Zane Gonzalez kick), 3:26. Commanders 7–0. Drive: 4 plays, 58 yards, 1:59.

Second quarter

- PHI – Jake Elliott 21-yard field goal, 0:19. Commanders 7–3. Drive: 15 plays, 87 yards, 3:52.

Third quarter

- WAS – Zane Gonzalez 45-yard field goal, 11:03. Commanders 10–3. Drive: 8 plays, 42 yards, 3:57.
- PHI – Jake Elliott 31-yard field goal, 5:32. Commanders 10–6. Drive: 10 plays, 74 yards, 5:31.

Fourth quarter

- PHI – Jalen Hurts 1-yard run (kick failed, wide left), 12:00. Eagles 12–10. Drive: 11 plays, 76 yards, 5:27.
- PHI – Saquon Barkley 23-yard run (Jake Elliott kick), 4:58. Eagles 19–10. Drive: 5 plays, 74 yards, 2:57.
- PHI – Saquon Barkley 39-yard run (Jake Elliott kick), 4:38. Eagles 26–10. Drive: 2 plays, 46 yards, 0:12.
- WAS – Zach Ertz 5-yard pass from Jayden Daniels (Jayden Daniels–Zach Ertz pass), 0:28. Eagles 26–18. Drive: 15 plays, 70 yards, 4:10.

Top passers

- WAS – Jayden Daniels – 22/32, 191 yards, TD, INT
- PHI – Jalen Hurts – 18/28, 221 yards

Top rushers

- WAS – Brian Robinson Jr. – 16 rushes, 63 yards, TD
- PHI – Saquon Barkley – 26 rushes, 146 yards, 2 TD

Top receivers

- WAS – Austin Ekeler – 8 receptions, 89 yards
- PHI – A. J. Brown – 5 receptions, 65 yards

Played on Thursday Night Football, tight end Zach Ertz, cornerback Mike Sainristil and running back Jeremy McNichols served as game captains. Linebacker Frankie Luvu recorded two sacks for the second time in the season while wide receiver Terry McLaurin surpassed 6,000 career receiving yards, becoming the sixth player in franchise history to do so.

=== Week 12: vs. Dallas Cowboys ===
Week 12: vs. Dallas Cowboys

| Quarter | 1 | 2 | 3 | 4 | Total |
|---|---|---|---|---|---|
| Cowboys | 0 | 3 | 7 | 24 | 34 |
| Commanders | 3 | 0 | 6 | 17 | 26 |

at Northwest Stadium, Landover, Maryland

- Date: November 24
- Game time: 1:00 pm EST
- Game weather: Sunny, 55 °F (13 °C)
- Game attendance: 64,955
- Referee: Tra Blake
- TV announcers (Fox): Joe Davis, Greg Olsen, and Pam Oliver
- Recap, Game Book

Game information

First quarter

- WAS – Austin Seibert 41-yard field goal, 9:01. Commanders 3–0. Drive: 7 plays, 17 yards, 2:24.

Second quarter

- DAL – Brandon Aubrey 46-yard field goal, 0:03. Tied 3–3. Drive: 3 plays, 58 yards, 0:42.

Third quarter

- WAS – Jayden Daniels 17-yard run (kick failed, wide left), 9:53. Commanders 9–3. Drive: 10 plays, 60 yards, 5:07.
- DAL – Jalen Tolbert 6-yard pass from Cooper Rush (Brandon Aubrey kick), 4:40. Cowboys 10–9. Drive: 8 plays, 80 yards, 5:13.

Fourth quarter

- DAL – Brandon Aubrey 48-yard field goal, 8:11. Cowboys 13–9. Drive: 6 plays, 20 yards, 3:06.
- DAL – Luke Schoonmaker 22-yard pass from Cooper Rush (Brandon Aubrey kick), 5:16. Cowboys 20–9. Drive: 5 plays, 44 yards, 2:47.
- WAS – Zach Ertz 4-yard pass from Jayden Daniels (Jayden Daniels run), 3:02. Cowboys 20–17. Drive: 9 plays, 69 yards, 2:14.
- DAL – KaVontae Turpin 99-yard kickoff return (Brandon Aubrey kick), 2:49. Cowboys 27–17.
- WAS – Austin Seibert 51-yard field goal, 1:40. Cowboys 27–20. Drive: 6 plays, 37 yards, 1:09.
- WAS – Terry McLaurin 86-yard pass from Jayden Daniels (kick failed, wide left), 0:21. Cowboys 27–26. Drive: 1 play, 86 yards, 0:12.
- DAL – Juanyeh Thomas 43-yard kickoff return (Brandon Aubrey kick), 0:14. Cowboys 34–26.

Top passers

- DAL – Cooper Rush – 24/32, 247 yards, 2 TD
- WAS – Jayden Daniels – 25/38, 275 yards, 2 TD, 2 INT

Top rushers

- DAL – Rico Dowdle – 19 rushes, 86 yards
- WAS – Jayden Daniels – 7 rushes, 74 yards, TD

Top receivers

- DAL – CeeDee Lamb – 10 receptions, 67 yards
- WAS – Terry McLaurin – 5 receptions, 102 yards, TD

Center Tyler Biadasz, defense end Dante Fowler and cornerback Noah Igbinoghene, who all played with the Cowboys in 2023, served as game captains. The Commanders blocked a field goal and punt in the same game for the first time since 1977. A total of 41 points were scored in the fourth quarter, including two kickoff return touchdowns by the Cowboys and an 86-yard touchdown reception by wide receiver Terry McLaurin in the final seconds, the longest of his career, before kicker Austin Seibert missed the extra point to potentially tie it. During the game, McLaurin surpassed former tight end Chris Cooley for fifth-most career receptions in team history.

=== Week 13: vs. Tennessee Titans ===
Week 13: vs. Tennessee Titans

| Quarter | 1 | 2 | 3 | 4 | Total |
|---|---|---|---|---|---|
| Titans | 0 | 7 | 6 | 6 | 19 |
| Commanders | 21 | 7 | 0 | 14 | 42 |

at Northwest Stadium, Landover, Maryland

- Date: December 1
- Game time: 1:00 pm EST
- Game weather: Cloudy, 42 °F (6 °C)
- Game attendance: 63,144
- Referee: Ronald Torbert
- TV announcers (CBS): Andrew Catalon, Tiki Barber, Jason McCourty, and A. J. Ross
- Recap, Game Book

Game information

First quarter

- WAS – Brian Robinson Jr. 40-yard run (Zane Gonzalez kick), 11:58. Commanders 7–0. Drive: 3 plays, 59 yards, 1:10.
- WAS – Jayden Daniels 3-yard run (Zane Gonzalez kick), 2:23. Commanders 14–0. Drive: 11 plays, 80 yards, 6:37.
- WAS – Terry McLaurin 16-yard pass from Jayden Daniels (Zane Gonzalez kick), 0:24. Commanders 21–0. Drive: 3 plays, 24 yards, 1:09.

Second quarter

- WAS – Terry McLaurin 3-yard pass from Jayden Daniels (Zane Gonzalez kick), 10:59. Commanders 28–0. Drive: 9 plays, 34 yards, 4:20.
- TEN – Nick Westbrook-Ikhine 27-yard pass from Will Levis (Nick Folk kick), 0:23. Commanders 28–7. Drive: 9 plays, 64 yards, 1:29.

Third quarter

- TEN – Nick Folk 41-yard field goal, 8:41. Commanders 28–10. Drive: 9 plays, 40 yards, 4:06.
- TEN – Nick Folk 44-yard field goal, 3:40. Commanders 28–13. Drive: 7 plays, 36 yards, 2:51.

Fourth quarter

- WAS – Zach Ertz 4-yard pass from Jayden Daniels (Zane Gonzalez kick), 14:15. Commanders 35–13. Drive: 9 plays, 72 yards, 4:25.
- TEN – Nick Westbrook-Ikhine 17-yard pass from Will Levis (pass failed), 7:07. Commanders 35–19. Drive: 7 plays, 58 yards, 2:09.
- WAS – Chris Rodriguez Jr. 7-yard run (Zane Gonzalez kick), 3:31. Commanders 42–19. Drive: 9 plays, 71 yards, 3:36.

Top passers

- TEN – Will Levis – 18/37, 212 yards, 2 TD
- WAS – Jayden Daniels – 25/30, 206 yards, 3 TD, INT

Top rushers

- TEN – Tony Pollard – 8 rushes, 35 yards
- WAS – Brian Robinson Jr. – 16 rushes, 103 yards, TD

Top receivers

- TEN – Nick Westbrook-Ikhine – 3 receptions, 61 yards, 2 TD
- WAS – Terry McLaurin – 8 receptions, 73 yards, 2 TD

Quarterback Marcus Mariota, defensive tackle Sheldon Day and punter Tress Way served as game captains. In scoring 42 points, the Commanders matched a season high and marked their first time since 1991 to score over 40 points in three or more games in a season. The Commanders had 267 total rushing yards, their most since 2012, with the game being their first December home win since 2017. Quarterback Jayden Daniels became the first rookie in NFL history to complete 80 percent of his passes, throw three touchdowns and run for a touchdown in a single game, was the first quarterback for the team to record three passing touchdowns with a rushing touchdown since 2015, and also became the first rookie quarterback in NFL history to throw for two touchdowns and rush for one in consecutive games since 1970. Running back Brian Robinson Jr.'s 40 yard touchdown run set a career high and was also the longest rush by the team since 2019. Linebacker Bobby Wagner surpassed 100 tackles for the season, extending his streak of doing so to 13 consecutive seasons. Cornerback Mike Sainristil forced and recovered a fumble, both career firsts, becoming the third rookie in team history to have done so in a single game.

=== Week 15: at New Orleans Saints ===
Week 15: at New Orleans Saints

| Quarter | 1 | 2 | 3 | 4 | Total |
|---|---|---|---|---|---|
| Commanders | 7 | 7 | 3 | 3 | 20 |
| Saints | 0 | 0 | 7 | 12 | 19 |

at Caesars Superdome, New Orleans, Louisiana

- Date: December 15
- Game time: 1:00 pm EST/12:00 pm CST
- Game weather: None (indoors)
- Game attendance: 70,003
- Referee: Shawn Hochuli
- TV announcers (Fox): Kenny Albert, Jonathan Vilma, and Megan Olivi
- Recap, Game Book

Game information

First quarter

- WAS – Terry McLaurin 16-yard pass from Jayden Daniels (Greg Joseph kick), 5:28. Commanders 7–0. Drive: 12 plays, 56 yards, 6:39.

Second quarter

- WAS – Terry McLaurin 3-yard pass from Jayden Daniels (Greg Joseph kick), 5:38. Commanders 14–0. Drive: 10 plays, 53 yards, 5:47.

Third quarter

- WAS – Greg Joseph 23-yard field goal, 8:12. Commanders 17–0. Drive: 11 plays, 63 yards, 6:48.
- NO – Alvin Kamara 21-yard pass from Cedrick Wilson Jr. (Blake Grupe kick), 5:45. Commanders 17–7. Drive: 6 plays, 71 yards, 2:27.

Fourth quarter

- WAS – Greg Joseph 41-yard field goal, 14:56. Commanders 20–7. Drive: 9 plays, 45 yards, 5:49.
- NO – Blake Grupe 41-yard field goal, 11:09. Commanders 20–10. Drive: 9 plays, 51 yards, 3:47.
- NO – Blake Grupe 51-yard field goal, 6:57. Commanders 20–13. Drive: 7 plays, 59 yards, 1:09.
- NO – Foster Moreau 1-yard pass from Spencer Rattler (pass failed), 0:00. Commanders 20–19. Drive: 11 plays, 56 yards, 1:55.

Top passers

- WAS – Jayden Daniels – 25/31, 226 yards, 2 TD
- NO – Spencer Rattler – 10/21, 135 yards, TD

Top rushers

- WAS – Jayden Daniels – 11 rushes, 66 yards
- NO – Kendre Miller – 9 rushes, 46 yards

Top receivers

- WAS – Terry McLaurin – 7 receptions, 73 yards, 2 TD
- NO – Marquez Valdes-Scantling – 2 receptions, 64 yards

Offensive tackles Trent Scott and Cornelius Lucas and defensive tackle Johnny Newton served as game captains. With the win, Washington had their first winning season since 2016. Terry McLaurin became the first wide receiver for the team to record 10 or more touchdowns in a season since Gary Clark in 1992. Quarterback Jayden Daniels became the third rookie in NFL history to pass for over 3,000 yards and rush for over 600 yards in a season as well as the fifth player and first rookie to have four games with completion percentage of at least 80% in a season. (Note: Minimum of 20 attempts per game) Daniels was also sacked eight times, a season-high.

Near the end of the fourth quarter, Saints tight end Foster Moreau was tackled near the goal line and side judge Jim Quirk signaled for the game clock to stop with nine seconds remaining before it restarted after approximately four seconds. The stoppage allowed for the Saints to spike the ball with three seconds remaining, with Moreau scoring a touchdown on the following play as time expired before an unsuccessful two-point conversion to win the game was attempted. Referee Shawn Hochuli stated after the game that the mistake was not reviewable.

=== Week 16: vs. Philadelphia Eagles ===
Week 16: vs. Philadelphia Eagles

| Quarter | 1 | 2 | 3 | 4 | Total |
|---|---|---|---|---|---|
| Eagles | 21 | 0 | 6 | 6 | 33 |
| Commanders | 7 | 7 | 0 | 22 | 36 |

at Northwest Stadium, Landover, Maryland

- Date: December 22
- Game time: 1:00 pm EST
- Game weather: Sunny, 32 °F (0 °C)
- Game attendance: 64,128
- Referee: Shawn Smith
- TV announcers (Fox): Joe Davis, Greg Olsen, and Pam Oliver
- Recap, Game Book

Game information

First quarter

- PHI – Saquon Barkley 2-yard run (Jake Elliott kick), 11:15. Eagles 7–0. Drive: 8 plays, 49 yards, 2:56.
- PHI – A. J. Brown 4-yard pass from Kenny Pickett (Jake Elliott kick), 7:08. Eagles 14–0. Drive: 8 plays, 57 yards, 3:53.
- WAS – Jamison Crowder 6-yard pass from Jayden Daniels (Zane Gonzalez kick), 3:12. Eagles 14–7. Drive: 4 plays, 25 yards, 1:18.
- PHI – Saquon Barkley 68-yard run (Jake Elliott kick), 2:18. Eagles 21–7. Drive: 2 plays, 69 yards, 0:54.

Second quarter

- WAS – Terry McLaurin 32-yard pass from Jayden Daniels (Zane Gonzalez kick), 6:46. Eagles 21–14. Drive: 8 plays, 96 yards, 3:43.

Third quarter

- PHI – Jake Elliott 24-yard field goal, 11:40. Eagles 24–14. Drive: 6 plays, 69 yards, 3:20.
- PHI – Jake Elliott 40-yard field goal, 3:11. Eagles 27–14. Drive: 14 plays, 36 yards, 8:13.

Fourth quarter

- WAS – Olamide Zaccheaus 4-yard pass from Jayden Daniels (Zane Gonzalez kick), 13:33. Eagles 27–21. Drive: 11 plays, 61 yards, 4:38.
- WAS – Olamide Zaccheaus 49-yard pass from Jayden Daniels (Zane Gonzalez kick), 9:06. Commanders 28–27. Drive: 7 plays, 87 yards, 2:04.
- PHI – Jake Elliott 50-yard field goal, 3:48. Eagles 30–28. Drive: 12 plays, 34 yards, 5:18.
- PHI – Jake Elliott 40-yard field goal, 1:58. Eagles 33–28. Drive: 4 plays, 5 yards, 0:55.
- WAS – Jamison Crowder 9-yard pass from Jayden Daniels (Jeremy McNichols run), 0:06. Commanders 36–33. Drive: 9 plays, 57 yards, 1:52.

Top passers

- PHI – Kenny Pickett – 14/24, 143 yards, TD, INT
- WAS – Jayden Daniels – 24/39, 258 yards, 5 TD, 2 INT

Top rushers

- PHI – Saquon Barkley – 29 rushes, 150 yards, 2 TD
- WAS – Jayden Daniels – 9 rushes, 81 yards

Top receivers

- PHI – A. J. Brown – 8 receptions, 97 yards, TD
- WAS – Olamide Zaccheaus – 5 receptions, 70 yards, 2 TD

Wide receiver Terry McLaurin, linebacker Bobby Wagner and safety Jeremy Reaves served as game captains. The Commanders won despite 5 turnovers (three fumbles and two interceptions) for the first time since 2002, marking their first season with double-digit wins since 2012. Jayden Daniels was the first Washington quarterback since Mark Rypien in 1991 and the sixth rookie in NFL history to throw five touchdowns in a game. He also surpassed Robert Griffin III's franchise rookie record for passing and total yards in a season.

McLaurin tied the franchise record for reception touchdowns in a season with 12, last done by Ricky Sanders in 1988, and surpassed 1,000 yards for the fifth consecutive season, also a franchise record. Wide receivers Jamison Crowder and Olamide Zaccheaus both caught two touchdowns, marking the first time Washington had two players record multiple touchdown receptions in a single game since 1999. Rookie wide receiver Luke McCaffrey recorded 180 return yards on kickoffs, the most by a Washington player since Brandon Banks in 2010. The win also gave Dan Quinn the most in a season for a first year head coach in franchise history.

=== Week 17: vs. Atlanta Falcons ===
Week 17: vs. Atlanta Falcons

| Quarter | 1 | 2 | 3 | 4 | OT | Total |
|---|---|---|---|---|---|---|
| Falcons | 7 | 10 | 0 | 7 | 0 | 24 |
| Commanders | 7 | 0 | 7 | 10 | 6 | 30 |

at Northwest Stadium, Landover, Maryland

- Date: December 29
- Game time: 8:20 pm EST
- Game weather: Cloudy, 58 °F (14 °C)
- Game attendance: 63,480
- Referee: Alex Kemp
- TV announcers (NBC): Mike Tirico, Cris Collinsworth, and Melissa Stark
- Recap, Game Book

Game information

First quarter

- WAS – Olamide Zaccheaus 7-yard pass from Jayden Daniels (Zane Gonzalez kick), 9:33. Commanders 7–0. Drive: 7 plays, 38 yards, 3:12.
- ATL – Bijan Robinson 1-yard run (Riley Patterson kick), 5:10. Tied 7–7. Drive: 10 plays, 70 yards, 4:23.

Second quarter

- ATL – Bijan Robinson 1-yard run (Riley Patterson kick), 4:24. Falcons 14–7. Drive: 11 plays, 72 yards, 6:13.
- ATL – Riley Patterson 39-yard field goal, 0:02. Falcons 17–7. Drive: 8 plays, 51 yards, 1:51.

Third quarter

- WAS – Zach Ertz 10-yard pass from Jayden Daniels (Zane Gonzalez kick), 7:13. Falcons 17–14. Drive: 15 plays, 69 yards, 7:47.

Fourth quarter

- WAS – Chris Rodriguez Jr. 2-yard run (Zane Gonzalez kick), 13:03. Commanders 21–17. Drive: 14 plays, 70 yards, 7:03.
- WAS – Zane Gonzalez 31-yard field goal, 4:32. Commanders 24–17. Drive: 10 plays, 52 yards, 5:30.
- ATL – Kyle Pitts 13-yard pass from Michael Penix Jr. (Riley Patterson kick), 1:19. Tied 24–24. Drive: 12 plays, 68 yards, 3:13.

Overtime

- WAS – Zach Ertz 2-yard pass from Jayden Daniels, 2:42. Commanders 30–24. Drive: 14 plays, 75 yards, 7:18.

Top passers

- ATL – Michael Penix Jr. – 19/35, 223 yards, TD, INT
- WAS – Jayden Daniels – 24/36, 227 yards, 3 TD, INT

Top rushers

- ATL – Bijan Robinson – 17 rushes, 90 yards, 2 TD
- WAS – Jayden Daniels – 16 rushes, 127 yards

Top receivers

- ATL – Drake London – 7 receptions, 106 yards
- WAS – Olamide Zaccheaus – 8 receptions, 85 yards, TD

Played on Sunday Night Football, quarterback Jayden Daniels and linebackers Frankie Luvu and Nick Bellore served as game captains. The Commanders would see their first overtime win since 2014 and first playoff berth since 2020. Daniels had his first career 100-yard rushing game and set the NFL record for most rushing yards in a season by a rookie quarterback. He also became the first quarterback in NFL history to throw for at least two touchdowns and 200 yards with 65 rushing yards in three consecutive games. The win also gave Adam Peters the most in a season for a first year general manager in franchise history.

=== Week 18: at Dallas Cowboys ===
Week 18: at Dallas Cowboys

| Quarter | 1 | 2 | 3 | 4 | Total |
|---|---|---|---|---|---|
| Commanders | 0 | 3 | 7 | 13 | 23 |
| Cowboys | 3 | 3 | 3 | 10 | 19 |

at AT&T Stadium, Arlington, Texas

- Date: January 5, 2025
- Game time: 1:00 pm EST/12:00 pm CST
- Game weather: None (retractable roof closed)
- Game attendance: 91,349
- Referee: Clete Blakeman
- TV announcers (Fox): Adam Amin, Mark Sanchez, and Kristina Pink
- Recap, Game Book

Game information

First quarter

- DAL – Brandon Aubrey 34-yard field goal, 8:20. Cowboys 3–0. Drive: 8 plays, 75 yards, 4:28.

Second quarter

- DAL – Brandon Aubrey 41-yard field goal, 12:41. Cowboys 6–0. Drive: 4 plays, -1 yard, 2:04.
- WAS – Zane Gonzalez 47-yard field goal, 4:40. Cowboys 6–3. Drive: 9 plays, 34 yards, 2:59.

Third quarter

- DAL – Brandon Aubrey 36-yard field goal, 8:52. Cowboys 9–3. Drive: 12 plays, 53 yards, 6:08.
- WAS – Zach Ertz 5-yard pass from Marcus Mariota (Zane Gonzalez kick), 5:07. Commanders 10–9. Drive: 8 plays, 70 yards, 3:45.

Fourth quarter

- DAL – Brandon Aubrey 22-yard field goal, 13:53. Cowboys 12–10. Drive: 15 plays, 66 yards, 6:14.
- WAS – Marcus Mariota 5-yard run (pass failed), 11:18. Commanders 16–12. Drive: 8 plays, 70 yards, 2:35.
- DAL – Rico Dowdle 2-yard run (Brandon Aubrey kick), 7:02. Cowboys 19–16. Drive: 8 plays, 70 yards, 4:16.
- WAS – Terry McLaurin 5-yard pass from Marcus Mariota (Zane Gonzalez kick), 0:03. Commanders 23–19. Drive: 11 plays, 91 yards, 3:15.

Top passers

- WAS – Marcus Mariota – 15/18, 161 yards, 2 TD
- DAL – Trey Lance – 20/34, 244 yards

Top rushers

- WAS – Marcus Mariota – 5 rushes, 56 yards, TD
- DAL – Rico Dowdle – 22 rushes, 72 yards, TD

Top receivers

- WAS – Terry McLaurin – 8 receptions, 62 yards, TD
- DAL – Jalen Tolbert – 4 receptions, 98 yards

Tight end Zach Ertz, defensive end Dorance Armstrong and safety Percy Butler served as game captains. Quarterback Jayden Daniels would sit in the second half of the game due to leg soreness, with backup Marcus Mariota rushing for a touchdown and throwing a game-winning pass to wide receiver Terry McLaurin with two seconds left. The touchdown catch gave McLaurin 13 for the season, a team record.

=== Wild Card Playoffs: at Tampa Bay Buccaneers ===
NFC Wild Card Playoffs: at (3) Tampa Bay Buccaneers

| Quarter | 1 | 2 | 3 | 4 | Total |
|---|---|---|---|---|---|
| Commanders | 0 | 10 | 3 | 10 | 23 |
| Buccaneers | 3 | 7 | 7 | 3 | 20 |

at Raymond James Stadium, Tampa, Florida

- Date: January 12, 2025
- Game time: 8:00 pm EST
- Game weather: Cloudy, 58 °F (14 °C)
- Game attendance: 64,614
- Referee: Craig Wrolstad
- TV announcers (NBC/Peacock): Mike Tirico, Cris Collinsworth, and Melissa Stark
- Recap, Game Book

Game information

First quarter

- TB – Chase McLaughlin 50-yard field goal, 11:35. Buccaneers 3–0. Drive: 8 plays, 38 yards, 3:25.

Second quarter

- WAS – Dyami Brown 10-yard pass from Jayden Daniels (Zane Gonzalez kick), 9:26. Commanders 7–3. Drive: 17 plays, 92 yards, 9:08.
- WAS – Zane Gonzalez 52-yard field goal, 1:52. Commanders 10–3. Drive: 11 plays, 37 yards, 5:28.
- TB – Mike Evans 1-yard pass from Baker Mayfield (Chase McLaughlin kick), 0:10. Tied 10–10. Drive: 7 plays, 74 yards, 1:42.

Third quarter

- WAS – Zane Gonzalez 22-yard field goal, 10:30. Commanders 13–10. Drive: 10 plays, 66 yards, 4:30.
- TB – Bucky Irving 4-yard pass from Baker Mayfield (Chase McLaughlin kick), 4:31. Buccaneers 17–13. Drive: 10 plays, 72 yards, 5:59.

Fourth quarter

- WAS – Terry McLaurin 5-yard pass from Jayden Daniels (Zane Gonzalez kick), 9:46. Commanders 20–17. Drive: 4 plays, 13 yards, 2:10.
- TB – Chase McLaughlin 32-yard field goal, 4:41. Tied 20–20. Drive: 8 plays, 61 yards, 5:05.
- WAS – Zane Gonzalez 37-yard field goal, 0:00. Commanders 23–20. Drive: 10 plays, 51 yards, 4:41

Top passers

- WAS – Jayden Daniels – 24/35, 268 yards, 2 TD
- TB – Baker Mayfield – 15/18, 185 yards, 2 TD

Top rushers

- WAS – Jayden Daniels – 13 rushes, 36 yards
- TB – Bucky Irving – 17 rushes, 77 yards

Top receivers

- WAS – Terry McLaurin – 7 receptions, 89 yards, TD
- TB – Mike Evans – 7 receptions, 92 yards, TD

The sixth-seeded Commanders visited the third-seeded Tampa Bay Buccaneers in the Wild Card round of the playoffs. The Commanders won their first playoff game since 2005 (coincidentally also against the Buccaneers) off a successful field goal by Zane Gonzalez as time expired, ending a four-game postseason losing streak and the league's third-longest active drought (after Miami and Las Vegas). It was the team's first time recording zero punts in a playoff game since 1945, with Dan Quinn joining Dutch Bergman as the only head coaches in franchise history to win a playoff game in their first season with the team. Quarterback Jayden Daniels threw for two touchdowns and became the fourth rookie quarterback and first since 2012 to win a road playoff game.

=== Divisional Playoffs: at Detroit Lions ===
NFC Divisional Playoffs: at (1) Detroit Lions

| Quarter | 1 | 2 | 3 | 4 | Total |
|---|---|---|---|---|---|
| Commanders | 3 | 28 | 0 | 14 | 45 |
| Lions | 7 | 14 | 7 | 3 | 31 |

at Ford Field, Detroit, Michigan

- Date: January 18, 2025
- Game time: 8:00 pm EST
- Game weather: None (indoors)
- Game attendance: 64,774
- Referee: Ronald Torbert
- TV announcers (Fox): Kevin Burkhardt, Tom Brady, Erin Andrews, and Tom Rinaldi
- Recap, Game Book

Game information

First quarter

- DET – Jahmyr Gibbs 1-yard run (Jake Bates kick), 7:36. Lions 7–0. Drive: 6 plays, 71 yards, 3:02.
- WAS – Zane Gonzalez 47-yard field goal, 3:50. Lions 7–3. Drive: 10 plays, 41 yards, 3:46.

Second quarter

- WAS – Brian Robinson Jr. 2-yard run (Zane Gonzalez kick), 10:55. Commanders 10–7. Drive: 11 plays, 78 yards, 5:00.
- DET – Sam LaPorta 2-yard pass from Jared Goff (Jake Bates kick), 7:44. Lions 14–10. Drive: 7 plays, 70 yards, 3:11.
- WAS – Terry McLaurin 58-yard pass from Jayden Daniels (Zane Gonzalez kick), 6:23. Commanders 17–14. Drive: 3 plays, 70 yards, 1:21.
- WAS – Quan Martin 40-yard interception return (Zane Gonzalez kick), 5:25. Commanders 24–14.
- DET – Jameson Williams 61-yard run (Jake Bates kick), 4:01. Commanders 24–21. Drive: 3 plays, 73 yards, 1:24.
- WAS – Zach Ertz 5-yard pass from Jayden Daniels (Zane Gonzalez kick), 1:46. Commanders 31–21. Drive: 7 plays, 70 yards, 2:15.

Third quarter

- DET – Jahmyr Gibbs 8-yard run (Jake Bates kick), 6:57. Commanders 31–28. Drive: 11 plays, 91 yards, 5:56.

Fourth quarter

- WAS – Brian Robinson Jr. 1-yard run (Zane Gonzalez kick), 13:29. Commanders 38–28. Drive: 15 plays, 70 yards, 8:28.
- WAS – Jeremy McNichols 1-yard run (Zane Gonzalez kick), 7:31. Commanders 45–28. Drive: 8 plays, 66 yards, 4:33.
- DET – Jake Bates 28-yard field goal, 5:01. Commanders 45–31. Drive: 10 plays, 60 yards, 2:30.

Top passers

- WAS – Jayden Daniels – 22/31, 299 yards, 2 TD
- DET – Jared Goff – 23/39, 313 yards, TD, 3 INT

Top rushers

- WAS – Brian Robinson Jr. – 15 rushes, 77 yards, 2 TD
- DET – Jahmyr Gibbs –

Top receivers

- WAS – Dyami Brown – 6 receptions, 98 yards
- DET – Amon-Ra St. Brown – 8 receptions, 137 yards

The Commanders defeated the No. 1 seed Detroit Lions in the Divisional Round. With the win, the Commanders advanced to the NFC Championship Game for the first time since 1991.

=== NFC Championship: at Philadelphia Eagles ===
NFC Championship: at (2) Philadelphia Eagles

| Quarter | 1 | 2 | 3 | 4 | Total |
|---|---|---|---|---|---|
| Commanders | 3 | 12 | 8 | 0 | 23 |
| Eagles | 14 | 13 | 7 | 21 | 55 |

at Lincoln Financial Field, Philadelphia, Pennsylvania

- Date: January 26, 2025
- Game time: 3:00 pm EST
- Game weather: Cloudy, 40 °F (4 °C)
- Game attendance: 69,879
- Referee: Shawn Hochuli
- TV announcers (Fox): Kevin Burkhardt, Tom Brady, Erin Andrews, and Tom Rinaldi
- Recap, Game Book

Game information

First quarter

- WAS – Zane Gonzalez 34-yard field goal, 7:57. Commanders 3–0. Drive: 18 plays, 54 yards, 7:03.
- PHI – Saquon Barkley 60-yard run (Jake Elliott kick), 7:39. Eagles 7–3. Drive: 1 play, 60 yards, 0:18.
- PHI – Saquon Barkley 4-yard run (Jake Elliott kick), 3:43. Eagles 14–3. Drive: 6 plays, 48 yards, 2:02.

Second quarter

- WAS – Zane Gonzalez 46-yard field goal, 14:42. Eagles 14–6. Drive: 10 plays, 45 yards, 4:01.
- WAS – Terry McLaurin 36-yard pass from Jayden Daniels (pass failed), 7:05. Eagles 14–12. Drive: 5 plays, 56 yards, 1:44.
- PHI – Jalen Hurts 1-yard run (run failed), 1:44. Eagles 20–12. Drive: 12 plays, 72 yards, 5:21.
- PHI – A. J. Brown 4-yard pass from Jalen Hurts (Jake Elliott kick), 0:39. Eagles 27–12. Drive: 7 plays, 24 yards, 0:57.
- WAS – Zane Gonzalez 42-yard field goal, 0:02. Eagles 27–15. Drive: 5 plays, 46 yards, 0:37.

Third quarter

- PHI – Jalen Hurts 9-yard run (Jake Elliott kick), 8:58. Eagles 34–15. Drive: 4 plays, 58 yards, 1:49.
- WAS – Jayden Daniels 10-yard run (Jayden Daniels–Olamide Zaccheaus pass), 5:01. Eagles 34–23. Drive: 8 plays, 70 yards, 3:57.

Fourth quarter

- PHI – Jalen Hurts 1-yard run (Jake Elliott kick), 12:24. Eagles 41–23. Drive: 5 plays, 51 yards, 2:58.
- PHI – Saquon Barkley 4-yard run (Jake Elliott kick), 7:58. Eagles 48–23. Drive: 4 plays, 31 yards, 2:21.
- PHI – Will Shipley 2-yard run (Jake Elliott kick), 3:03. Eagles 55–23. Drive: 4 plays, 80 yards, 1:48.

Top passers

- WAS – Jayden Daniels – 29/48, 255 yards, TD, INT
- PHI – Jalen Hurts – 20/28, 246 yards, TD

Top rushers

- WAS – Jayden Daniels – 6 rushes, 48 yards, TD
- PHI – Saquon Barkley – 15 rushes, 118 yards, 3 TD

Top receivers

- WAS – Zach Ertz – 11 receptions, 104 yards
- PHI – A. J. Brown – 6 receptions, 96 yards, TD

The Commanders visited the No. 2 seed Philadelphia Eagles in the NFC Championship Game. This marked the second postseason meeting all-time between the division rivals and the first since 1990.
