= Jer'Zhan Newton =

American football player (born 2002)

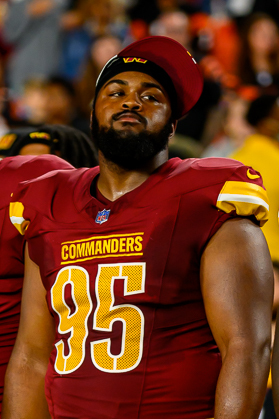
- Newton with the Washington Commanders in 2025

No. 95 – Washington Commanders
- Position: Defensive tackle
- Roster status: Active

Personal information
- Born: August 31, 2002 (age 24); St. Petersburg, Florida, U.S.
- Listed height: 6 ft 2 in (1.88 m)
- Listed weight: 295 lb (134 kg)

Career information
- High school: Clearwater Central Catholic (Clearwater, Florida)
- College: Illinois (2020–2023)
- NFL draft: 2024: 2nd round, 36th overall pick

Career history
- Washington Commanders (2024–present)

Awards and highlights
- Consensus All-American (2023); Big Ten Defensive Player of the Year (2023); Big Ten Defensive Lineman of the Year (2023); 2× first-team All-Big Ten (2022, 2023)

Career NFL statistics as of 2025
- Tackles: 82
- Sacks: 7.0
- Forced fumbles: 2
- Fumble recoveries: 1
- Pass deflections: 2
- Stats at Pro Football Reference

Jer'Zhan "Johnny" Newton (jer-ZAHN; born August 31, 2002) is an American professional football defensive tackle for the Washington Commanders of the National Football League (NFL). He played college football for the Illinois Fighting Illini, where he was named the Big Ten Defensive Player of the Year and earned consensus All-American honors in 2023. Newton was selected by the Commanders in the second round of the 2024 NFL draft.

== Early life ==
Newton was born on August 31, 2002, in St. Petersburg, Florida. He attended and played football at Clearwater Central Catholic High School in Clearwater, Florida, where he recorded 244 tackles and 24 sacks. He originally committed to play college football for the Maryland Terrapins before switching to the Illinois Fighting Illini at the University of Illinois.

== College career ==
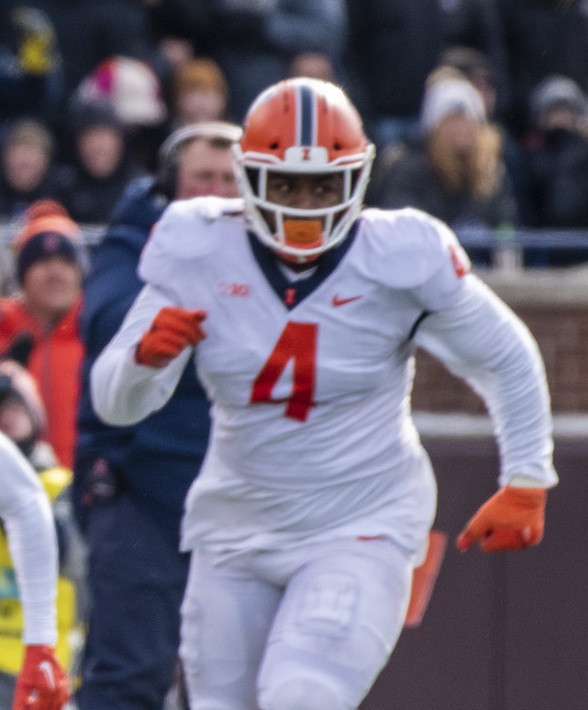
Newton with the Illinois Fighting Illini in 2022

As a true freshman for the Illinois Fighting Illini in 2020, Newton played in all eight games with two starts and had 23 tackles and 1.5 sacks. In 2021, he started 11 of 12 games, recording 50 tackles and 3.5 sacks. Newton returned to Illinois in 2022. Newton declared for the 2024 NFL draft following the 2023 season, where he was named a consensus All-American and the Big 10's Nagurski–Woodson Defensive Player of the Year. He finished his career with 18 sacks, tying Moe Gardner for the most for an Illinois defensive tackle.

== Professional career ==
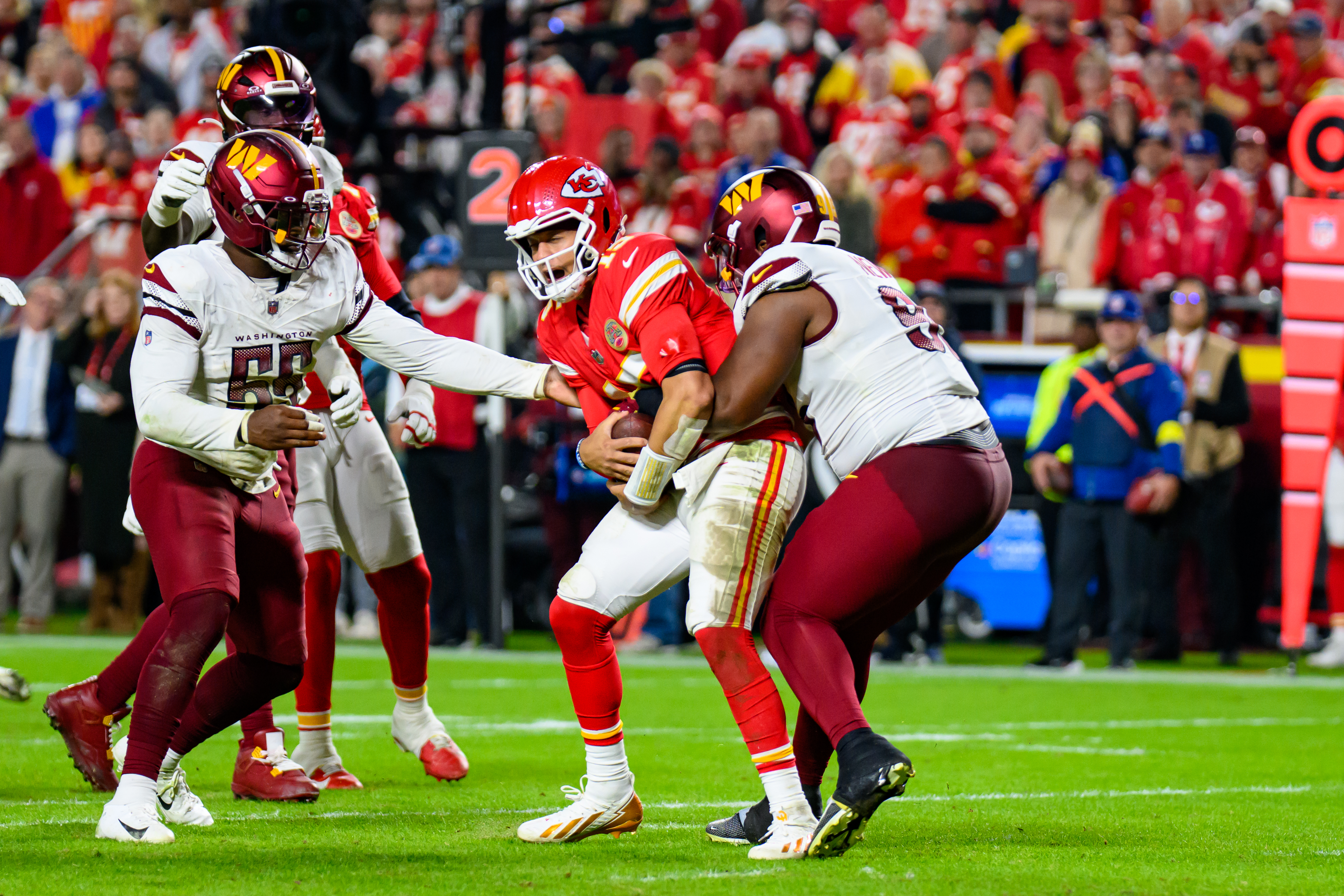
Newton tackling Kansas City Chiefs quarterback Patrick Mahomes, 2025

Pre-draft measurables
| Height | Weight | Arm length | Hand span | Wingspan |
|---|---|---|---|---|
| 6 ft 1 5/8 in (1.87 m) | 304 lb (138 kg) | 32 3/8 in (0.82 m) | 9 1/2 in (0.24 m) | 6 ft 3 7/8 in (1.93 m) |
All values from NFL Combine

Newton was selected by the Washington Commanders in the second round (36th overall) of the 2024 NFL draft. He underwent surgery in May 2024 to fix a Jones fracture in his left foot, which followed the same surgery on his right foot four months prior. Newton signed his four-year rookie contract, worth $9.75 million, on June 13, 2024. He was briefly on the non-football injury list prior to the start of training camp. Newton recorded his first career sack and fumble recovery in the Week 8 game against the Chicago Bears.

On August 19, 2026, Newton received surgery to repair a torn pectoral muscle. He was placed on injured reserve to start the regular season. He was activated on November 7.

== Career statistics ==
=== NFL ===
Legend
| **Bold** | Career high |

==== Regular season ====
| Year | Team | Games | | Tackles | | | | | Interceptions | | | | Fumbles | | | |
| Year | Team | GP | GS | Cmb | Solo | Ast | Sck | TFL | Int | Yds | TD | PD | FF | FR | Yds | TD |
|---|---|---|---|---|---|---|---|---|---|---|---|---|---|---|---|---|
| 2024 | WAS | 16 | 11 | **44** | 19 | **25** | 2.0 | **6** | – | – | – | **1** | **1** | **1** | **2** | – |
| 2025 | WAS | 17 | 2 | 38 | **21** | 17 | **5.0** | 4 | – | – | – | **1** | **1** | 0 | 0 | – |
| Career | | 33 | 13 | 82 | 40 | 42 | 7.0 | 10 | – | – | – | 2 | 2 | 1 | 2 | – |

==== Postseason ====
| Year | Team | Games | | Tackles | | | | | Interceptions | | | | Fumbles | | | |
| Year | Team | GP | GS | Cmb | Solo | Ast | Sck | TFL | Int | Yds | TD | PD | FF | FR | Yds | TD |
|---|---|---|---|---|---|---|---|---|---|---|---|---|---|---|---|---|
| 2024 | WAS | 3 | 0 | 4 | 4 | 0 | 0.0 | 1 | – | – | – | 0 | 0 | 0 | 0 | – |
| Career | | 3 | 0 | 4 | 4 | 0 | 0.0 | 1 | – | – | – | 0 | 0 | 0 | 0 | – |

=== College ===
College statistics
| Year | Team | GP | Tackles | | | | | Fumbles | |
| Year | Team | GP | Solo | Ast | Cmb | TfL | Sck | FR | FF |
|---|---|---|---|---|---|---|---|---|---|
| 2020 | Illinois | 7 | 6 | 17 | 23 | 1.5 | 1.5 | – | 1 |
| 2021 | Illinois | 12 | 19 | 31 | 50 | 3.5 | 3.5 | – | – |
| 2022 | Illinois | 13 | 29 | 33 | 62 | 14 | 5.5 | 2 | – |
| 2023 | Illinois | 12 | 26 | 26 | 52 | 8.5 | 7.5 | 1 | 1 |
| Career | | 44 | 80 | 107 | 187 | 27.5 | 18 | 3 | 2 |

== Personal life ==
Newton has four brothers, Jervon, Jerquan, Jerjuan, and Jershaun. Jerjuan ranks within the top ten in career touchdown receptions for the Toledo Rockets. His cousin Pro Wells played tight end for the Philadelphia Stars of the United States Football League (USFL) in the early 2020s.
