= Colson Yankoff =

American football player (born 2000)

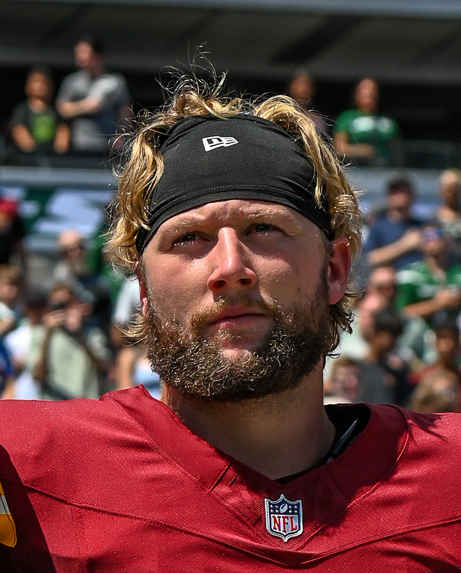
- Yankoff with the Washington Commanders in 2024

No. 80 – Washington Commanders
- Positions: Tight end, special teamer
- Roster status: Active

Personal information
- Born: March 1, 2000 (age 26); Coeur d'Alene, Idaho, U.S.
- Listed height: 6 ft 4 in (1.93 m)
- Listed weight: 225 lb (102 kg)

Career information
- High school: Coeur d'Alene (Coeur d'Alene)
- College: Washington (2018); UCLA (2019–2023)
- NFL draft: 2024: undrafted

Career history
- Washington Commanders (2024–present)

Career NFL statistics as of Week 9, 2026
- Receptions: 8
- Receiving yards: 40
- Tackles: 22
- Stats at Pro Football Reference

Colson Yankoff (born March 1, 2000) is an American professional football tight end and special teamer for the Washington Commanders of the National Football League (NFL). He played college football for the Washington Huskies and UCLA Bruins He signed with the Commanders as an undrafted free agent in 2024 and moved to tight end during his rookie season after entering college as a quarterback at University of Washington and playing running back and wide receiver at UCLA. In both his collegiate and professional career, Yankoff has also frequently played special teams.

== Early life and college ==
Yankoff was born on March 1, 2000, in Coeur d'Alene, Idaho. He played football as a quarterback at Coeur d'Alene High School, leading them to the state 5A championship game as a senior in 2017. Yankoff initially verbally committed to play college football at the University of Oregon; however, he de-committed upon the firing of Oregon head coach Mark Helfrich. A 4-star recruit, Yankoff eventually enrolled at the University of Washington to play college football for the Huskies. Considered the top recruit of their class by 247Sports, he redshirted his freshman year and transferred to the University of California, Los Angeles (UCLA) after the season to play for the Bruins. He sat out of the 2019 season after the Huskies blocked a bid for him to have immediate playing eligibility. He played at wide receiver with UCLA in 2020 and 2021 and at running back and on special teams in 2022 and 2023. As a student, he earned a degree in economics and a master's degree in education.

== Professional career ==
Pre-draft measurables
Height	Weight	Arm length	Hand span	Wingspan	40-yard dash	10-yard split	20-yard split	20-yard shuttle	Three-cone drill	Vertical jump	Broad jump	Bench press
6 ft 3 1/4 in (1.91 m)	233 lb (106 kg)	32 in (0.81 m)	9 1/2 in (0.24 m)	6 ft 6 7/8 in (2.00 m)	4.62 s	1.57 s	2.63 s	4.25 s	7.00 s	33.5 in (0.85 m)	9 ft 10 in (3.00 m)	18 reps
All values from Pro Day

Yankoff signed with the Washington Commanders as an undrafted free agent in 2024, converting to tight end from his college positions of running back and wide receiver. He was placed on injured reserve on November 9, 2024. He returned to the active roster during the playoffs and played in both the NFC Wild Card Round and Divisional Round. Yankoff played in six regular season games for the Commanders as a rookie, playing six offensive snaps and 101 special teams snaps. Yankoff recorded four tackles on special teams as a rookie.

Yankoff entered the 2025 season as one of Washington's auxiliary tight ends. In Week 11 against the Miami Dolphins, Yankoff recorded his first career catch on a four-yard reception from Marcus Mariota.

With Jayden Daniels already sidelined, Yankoff served as Athan Kaliakmanis' emergency quarterback in Week 4 of the 2026 season against the Indianapolis Colts, after Marcus Mariota left the game with a knee injury.
