= Jordan Magee =

American football player (born 2001)

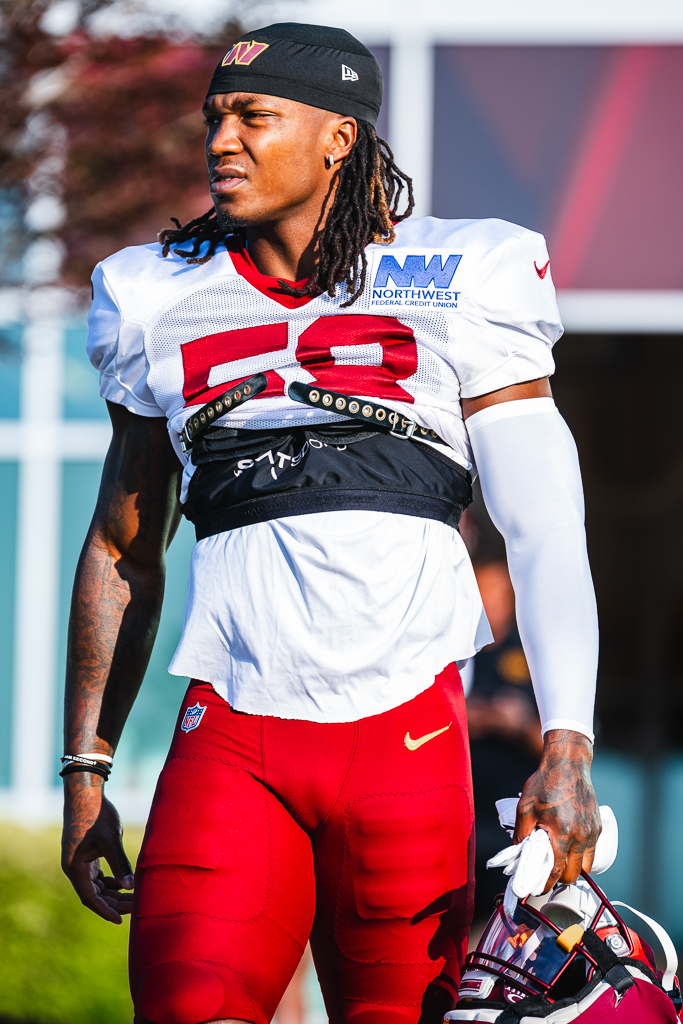
- Magee with the Washington Commanders in 2025

No. 58 – Washington Commanders
- Position: Linebacker
- Roster status: Active

Personal information
- Born: March 24, 2001 (age 25); Towson, Maryland, U.S.
- Listed height: 6 ft 3 in (1.91 m)
- Listed weight: 225 lb (102 kg)

Career information
- High school: Dover (Dover, Delaware)
- College: Temple (2019–2023)
- NFL draft: 2024: 5th round, 139th overall pick

Career history
- Washington Commanders (2024–present)

Awards and highlights
- Second-team All-AAC (2023)

Career NFL statistics as of 2025
- Tackles: 63
- Pass deflections: 1
- Stats at Pro Football Reference

Jordan Machai Magee (born March 24, 2001) is an American professional football linebacker for the Washington Commanders of the National Football League (NFL). He played college football for the Temple Owls and was selected by the Commanders in the fifth round of the 2024 NFL draft.

== Early life ==
Magee was born on March 24, 2001, in Towson, Maryland, later moving to Dover, Delaware. He attended Dover High School where he played football and basketball, playing at quarterback and safety in the former. As a senior, he helped Dover to a 9–2 record while throwing for 1,208 yards and 18 touchdowns, being named first-team all-conference and second-team all-state as the team reached the Delaware playoff semifinals. Magee was a 2-star recruit listed as a positionless “athlete”, although he recognized late in his high school career that he would likely be most successful in college as a linebacker or safety. He committed to Temple to play college football over offers from Delaware State and Morgan State.

== College career ==
As a true freshman at Temple in 2019, Magee redshirted while appearing in four games as a special teams player. He had 15 tackles while playing in five games in the 2020 season. He became a starting linebacker early in the 2021 season, recording 54 tackles and three passes defended that year. The following year, he recorded a team-leading 86 tackles along with 9.0 tackles-for-loss (TFLs) and 4.5 sacks, being 10th in the American Athletic Conference (AAC) in tackles while being selected honorable mention All-AAC. In 2023, he recorded 80 tackles which placed eighth in the conference and led Temple, also being the third-leading player in the AAC in tackles-for-loss with 14. He was named second-team All-AAC. Magee finished his collegiate career with 235 tackles, eight sacks, one interception, 11 passes defended, two forced fumbles, and two fumble recoveries.

== Professional career ==
Pre-draft measurables
Height	Weight	Arm length	Hand span	Wingspan	40-yard dash	10-yard split	20-yard split	20-yard shuttle	Three-cone drill	Vertical jump	Broad jump
6 ft 1 3/8 in (1.86 m)	228 lb (103 kg)	32 in (0.81 m)	8 3/4 in (0.22 m)	6 ft 4 in (1.93 m)	4.55 s	1.54 s	2.63 s	4.16 s	6.90 s	35.5 in (0.90 m)	10 ft 4 in (3.15 m)
All values from NFL Combine/Pro Day

Magee was selected by the Washington Commanders in the fifth round (139th overall) of the 2024 NFL draft. He signed his four-year rookie contract on May 10, 2024. Magee injured his knee in a preseason game against the New York Jets and was placed on injured reserve on August 27, after undergoing a minor procedure to repair it. He returned to the active roster on October 23.

On September 16, 2026, the Commanders placed Magee on injured reserve due to a hamstring injury. On October 19, the Commanders activated Magee ahead of their Week 6 matchup against the San Francisco 49ers.

== NFL career statistics ==
Legend
**Bold**	Career high

=== Regular season ===
Year	Team	Games		Tackles					Interceptions						Fumbles				
Year	Team	GP	GS	Cmb	Solo	Ast	Sck	TFL	Int	Yds	Avg	Lng	TD	PD	FF	Fmb	FR	Yds	TD
2024	WAS	8	1	9	7	2	0.0	0	0	0	0.0	0	0	0	0	0	0	0	0
2025	WAS	17	8	**54**	**31**	**23**	0.0	**3**	0	0	0.0	0	0	**1**	0	0	0	0	0
Career		25	9	63	38	25	0.0	3	0	0	0.0	0	0	1	0	0	0	0	0

=== Postseason ===
Year	Team	Games		Tackles					Interceptions						Fumbles				
Year	Team	GP	GS	Cmb	Solo	Ast	Sck	TFL	Int	Yds	Avg	Lng	TD	PD	FF	Fmb	FR	Yds	TD
2024	WAS	1	1	1	0	1	0.0	0	0	0	0.0	0	0	0	0	0	0	0	0
Career		1	1	1	0	1	0.0	0	0	0	0.0	0	0	0	0	0	0	0	0
