= Tackle =

Tackle may refer to:

- In football:
  - Tackle (football move), a play in various forms of football
  - Tackle (gridiron football position), a position in American football and Canadian football
  - Dump tackle, a forceful move in rugby of picking up an opposing player and throwing them to the ground
  - The Tackle, a term for the final play of Super Bowl XXXIV
  - Sliding tackle, a tackle in association football
- Fishing tackle, the gear or equipment used when fishing
- An assembly of pulleys with a rope threaded through them; see block and tackle
- Tackle (Transformers), a fictional character
