= Brandon Sosna =

American sports executive (born c. 1992–1993)

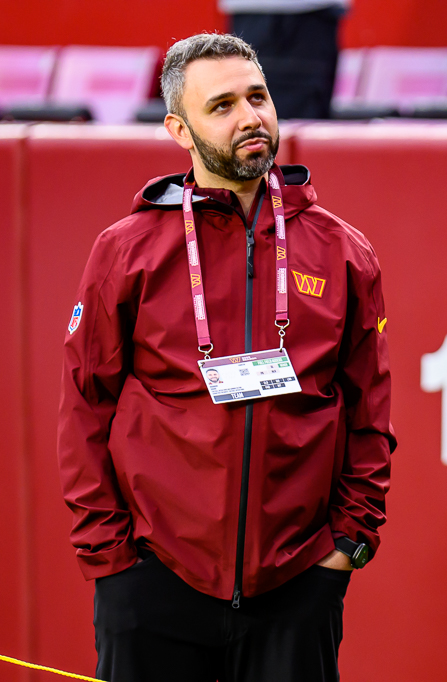
- Sosna with the Washington Commanders in 2025

Washington Commanders
- Title: Senior vice president of football operations

Personal information
- Born: 1992 or 1993 (age 33–34); Cincinnati, Ohio, U.S.

Career information
- High school: Sycamore (Cincinnati)
- College: Penn (2011–2015)

Career history
- Cincinnati Bearcats (2015–2016); Director of strategic relations; Associate director of marketing; Cincinnati Bearcats (2016–2017); Chief of staff; Cleveland Browns (2017); Football administration assistant; Cleveland Browns (2018); Salary cap and contract analyst; Cincinnati Bearcats (2019); Chief revenue officer; Senior associate athletic director; USC Trojans (2020–2022); Chief of staff; Executive senior associate athletic director; Detroit Lions (2022–2023); Senior director of football administration; Washington Commanders (2024–present); Senior vice president of football operations

Brandon Sosna (born c. 1992–1993) is an American sports administrator and executive who is the senior vice president of football operations for the Washington Commanders of the National Football League (NFL). Sosna leads contract negotiations for the team and oversees the analytics and health departments. He has also worked as a chief of staff and assistant athletic director for the NCAA's Cincinnati Bearcats and USC Trojans and as an administrator for the NFL's Cleveland Browns and Detroit Lions.

== Early life ==
Sosna was born c. 1992–1993 in Cincinnati, Ohio. He attended Sycamore High School, where he coached students in a school-wide basketball league formed by himself. During his summer vacations, Sosna worked as volunteer coach at Cincinnati Bearcats basketball camps. He enrolled at the University of Pennsylvania School of Arts and Sciences in 2011 and graduated with a bachelor's degree in political science in 2015.

== Career ==
Shortly after graduation, Sosna was hired in the marketing department of the Cincinnati Bearcats athletic program. He was promoted to chief of staff in 2016 at the age of 23. The following year, he joined the NFL's Cleveland Browns as an assistant in football administration after being interested working with Browns executives Sashi Brown and Paul DePodesta. There, Sosna assisted in managing the salary cap, negotiating contracts, and developing free agent evaluations. He was rehired by the Bearcats as chief revenue officer and senior associate athletic director in February 2019, overseeing ticket sales, media relations, and marketing under athletic director Mike Bohn.

Sosna followed Bohn to the USC Trojans in December 2019 and worked as their chief of staff and executive senior associate athletic director focusing on their football program, where he was considered key in the hiring of head coach Lincoln Riley in 2021. Sosna was hired by the NFL's Detroit Lions in July 2022 as the senior director of football administration, serving as their primary contract negotiator. He left in May 2024 to join the NFL's Washington Commanders as the senior vice president of football operations, handling contracts in addition to leading their analytics and football administration departments.

== Personal life ==
Sosna is the youngest of six siblings. His father Harold Sosna was a former president of a Cincinnati-based nursing home management company who plead guilty to bank fraud in October 2021 by way of a $59 million check kiting scheme and was sentenced to 42 months in prison. Sosna is Jewish; his paternal and maternal grandparents were Holocaust survivors and he participated in the 2010 March of the Living trip to the Auschwitz concentration camp. He served as president of Penn's Zeta Beta Tau fraternity chapter. He was listed on the 2020 Forbes 30 Under 30 list for his work as the chief revenue officer for the Bearcats.
