= David Blackburn (American football) =

American football executive (born 1982)

Washington Commanders
- Title: Director of player personnel

Personal information
- Born: May 26, 1982 (age 44); Indianapolis, Indiana, U.S.

Career information
- Position: Cornerback
- High school: Ben Davis (Indianapolis)
- College: DePauw (2000–2004)

Career history
- Butler Bulldogs (2006); Graduate assistant; Baltimore Ravens (2007–2023); Player personnel assistant (2007–2011); Area scout (2012–2019); National scout (2020–2021); Director of college scouting (2022–2023); Washington Commanders (2024–present); Director of player personnel

Awards and highlights
- DePauw Athletics Hall of Fame (2020); 4× All-SCAC (2000–2004)

David Blackburn (born May 26, 1982) is an American professional football executive who is the director of player personnel for the Washington Commanders of the National Football League (NFL). He played college football as a cornerback for the DePauw Tigers, earning four All-Southern Collegiate Athletic Conference honors. Blackburn was a scout for the NFL's Baltimore Ravens for 16 years prior to joining the Commanders in 2024.

== Early life ==
Blackburn was born on May 26, 1982, in Indianapolis, Indiana, later attending Ben Davis High School. He played college football as a cornerback for the Tigers of DePauw University, earning four All-Southern Collegiate Athletic Conference honors from 2000 to 2004. He graduated with a degree in economics and a minor in history. In 2021, he was named to the DePauw Athletics Hall of Fame.

== Career ==
Blackburn worked as a graduate assistant for the Bulldogs of Butler University in 2006. He joined the Baltimore Ravens as a player personnel assistant the following year, spending seven years as a West area scout and two years as a national scout before being promoted to director of college scouting in June 2022. He participated in the NFL's Front Office & General Manager Accelerator Program in 2023. Blackburn joined the Washington Commanders as director of player personnel in May 2024.
