= Trent Scott =

American football player (born 1994)

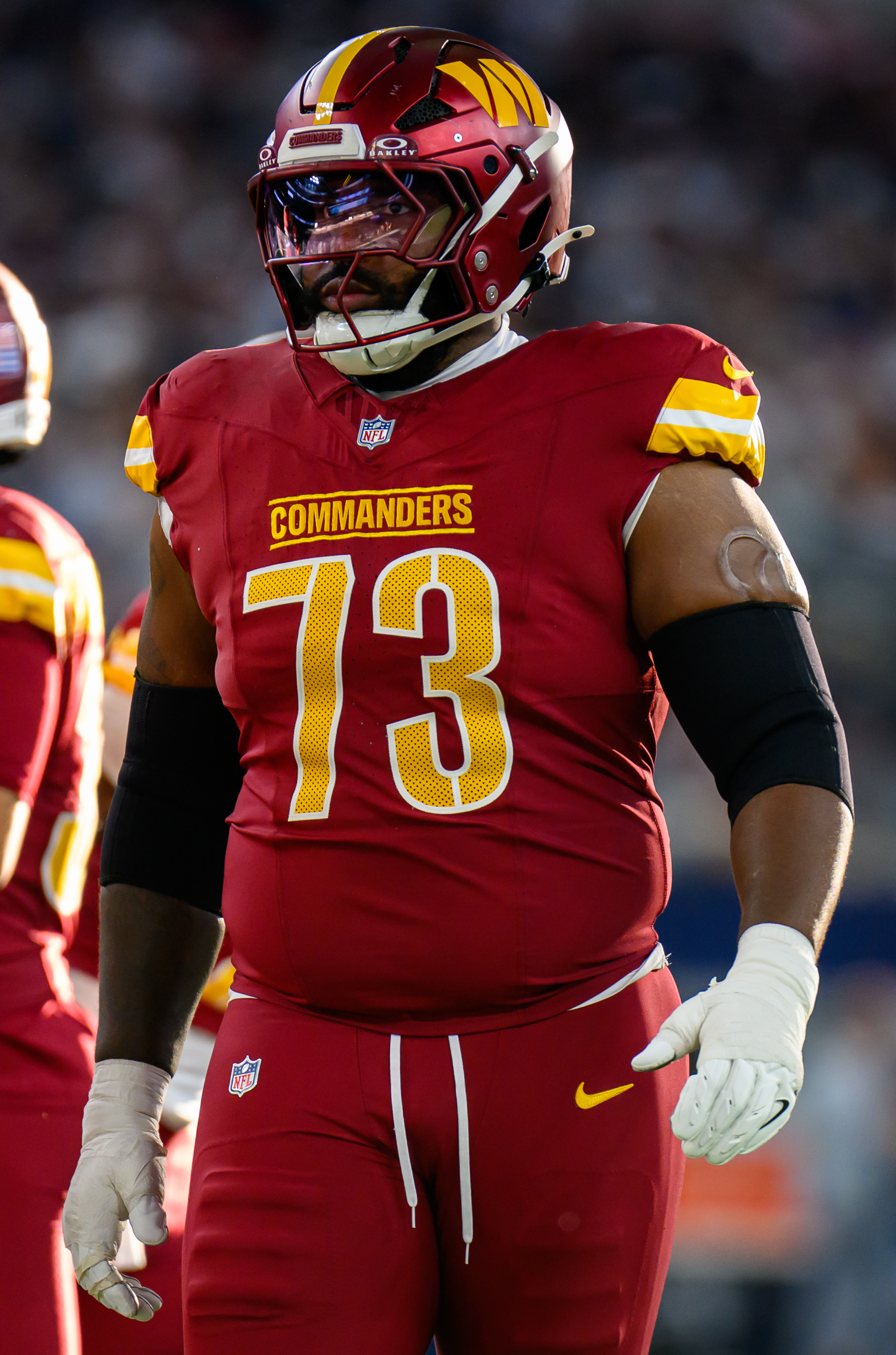
- Scott with the Washington Commanders in 2025

No. 73 – Washington Commanders
- Position: Guard
- Roster status: Practice squad

Personal information
- Born: January 25, 1994 (age 32); Huntsville, Alabama, U.S.
- Listed height: 6 ft 5 in (1.96 m)
- Listed weight: 320 lb (145 kg)

Career information
- High school: Lee (Huntsville)
- College: Grambling State (2013–2017)
- NFL draft: 2018: undrafted

Career history
- Los Angeles Chargers (2018–2019); Carolina Panthers (2020–2021); Pittsburgh Steelers (2022); Washington Commanders (2023–present)

Awards and highlights
- First-team All-SWAC (2017)

Career NFL statistics as of 2025
- Games played: 96
- Games started: 26
- Receiving touchdowns: 1
- Stats at Pro Football Reference

Trenton Denzel Scott (born January 25, 1994) is an American professional football guard for the Washington Commanders of the National Football League (NFL). Scott played college football for the Grambling State Tigers and signed with the Los Angeles Chargers as an undrafted free agent in 2018. He has also been a member of the Carolina Panthers and Pittsburgh Steelers.

== Early life ==
Scott was born on January 25, 1994, in Huntsville, Alabama. He attended Lee High School, where was a three-time all-state selection and played with wide receiver Chester Rogers.

== College career ==
Scott played five seasons for the Grambling State Tigers, redshirting his sophomore season due to injury. Over the course of his entire college career, Scott gave up only three sacks. As a senior, Scott did not allow a single sack and tallied with 39 pancake blocks and 32 knockdowns and was named first team All-Southwestern Athletic Conference. He graduated with a degree in Sports Management as a junior and was working on a master's degree in Sports Administration during his senior season.

== Professional career ==
Pre-draft measurables
Height	Weight	Arm length	Hand span	Wingspan	40-yard dash	10-yard split	20-yard split	20-yard shuttle	Three-cone drill	Vertical jump	Broad jump	Bench press
6 ft 4 1/2 in (1.94 m)	301 lb (137 kg)	34 3/8 in (0.87 m)	9 1/4 in (0.23 m)	6 ft 9 1/2 in (2.07 m)	5.36 s	1.88 s	3.13 s	4.94 s	7.97 s	26.0 in (0.66 m)	8 ft 6 in (2.59 m)	15 reps
All values from Pro Day

=== Los Angeles Chargers ===
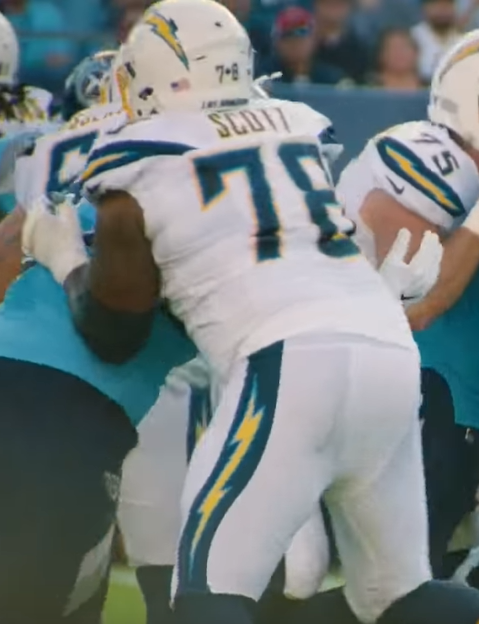
Scott with the Los Angeles Chargers in 2019

Scott signed with the Los Angeles Chargers as an undrafted free agent in April 2018. He was cut from the 53-man roster at the end of training camp and subsequently signed to the Chargers' practice squad on September 2. Scott was promoted to the Chargers active roster on September 15. Scott made his NFL debut on September 23 against the Los Angeles Rams. He made his first career start at left tackle on October 7 against the Oakland Raiders in place of an injured Russell Okung. In his rookie season, Scott played in nine games with one start.

Scott began the 2019 season as the Chargers' starting left tackle after Okung was placed on the non-football injury list due to blood clots. He started the first seven games of the season and played in all 16 of the Chargers games with nine total starts, playing 78 percent of the Chargers offensive snaps (827) and giving up five sacks. Scott was assigned a one-year tender by the Chargers on March 17, 2020. He signed the tender on April 21, 2020. He was waived on September 5, 2020.

=== Carolina Panthers ===
On September 6, 2020, Scott was claimed off waivers by the Carolina Panthers. He was placed on the reserve/COVID-19 list by the Panthers on October 21, and was activated two days later. He started four games at left tackle for the Panthers in 2020 before being placed on injured reserve on December 28. On February 23, 2021, Scott signed a one-year extension to stay with the Panthers.

=== Pittsburgh Steelers ===
On May 13, 2022, Scott signed a one-year contract with the Pittsburgh Steelers. He was waived during final roster cuts on August 30, but was re-signed to the active roster on September 1.

=== Washington Commanders ===
Scott signed a two-year contract with the Washington Commanders on March 23, 2023. He finished the season having played in ten games with starting at right tackle for the last two games of the season as a fill-in for an injured Andrew Wylie. In a Week 3 Monday Night Football win over the Cincinnati Bengals in 2024, Scott lined up as an eligible receiver and scored his first career touchdown on a one-yard reception from quarterback Jayden Daniels, who also threw his first career passing touchdown on the play. After Sam Cosmi left in the first half of the Divisional round game against the Detroit Lions, Scott filled in at right guard for the remainder of the game. With Cosmi out for the rest of the 2024-25 playoffs due to a torn ACL, the Commanders made Scott the starting right guard for the NFC Championship Game versus the Philadelphia Eagles.

On March 21, 2025, Scott re-signed with the Commanders on a one-year contract.

Scott re-signed with the team on another one-year contract on March 13, 2026. He was released by the Commanders as a part of final roster cuts on August 30; he was re-signed to their practice squad the following day.
