= Tyler Owens =

American football player (born 2001)

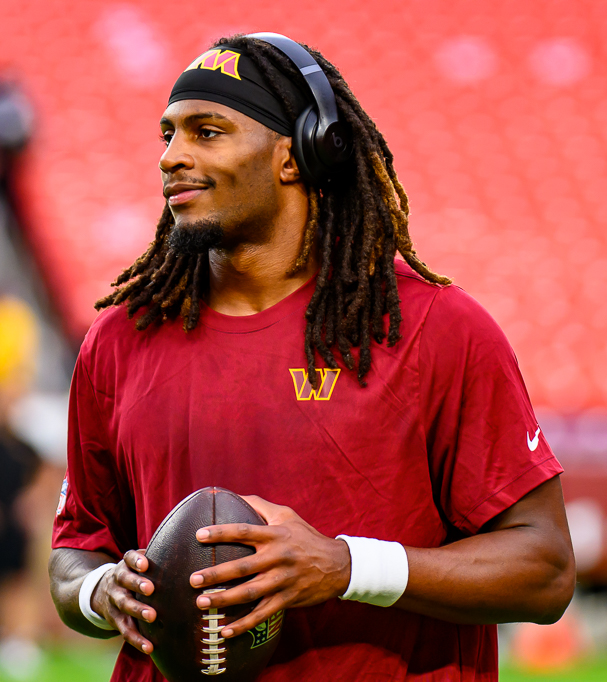
- Owens with the Washington Commanders in 2025

No. 18 – Washington Commanders
- Positions: Safety, Special teamer
- Roster status: Active

Personal information
- Born: May 12, 2001 (age 25); Plano, Texas, U.S.
- Listed height: 6 ft 2 in (1.88 m)
- Listed weight: 213 lb (97 kg)

Career information
- High school: Plano East Senior (Plano)
- College: Texas (2019–2021); Texas Tech (2022–2023)
- NFL draft: 2024: undrafted

Career history
- Washington Commanders (2024–present)

Career NFL statistics as of 2025
- Tackles: 24
- Forced fumbles: 1
- Stats at Pro Football Reference

Tyler Owens (born May 12, 2001) is an American professional football safety and special teamer for the Washington Commanders of the National Football League (NFL). He played college football for the Texas Longhorns and Texas Tech Red Raiders and signed with the Commanders as an undrafted free agent in 2024.

== Early life ==
Owens was born on May 12, 2001, in Plano, Texas. He attended Plano East Senior High School where he played football and ran track. As a senior, he totaled 67 tackles, eight pass breakups and two interceptions while being selected to the All-American Bowl. He was also a top athlete on the track team. A top safety recruit, he was ranked by sources as a four- or five-star prospect. He committed to play college football for the Texas Longhorns.

== College career ==
As a true freshman at Texas in 2019, Owens appeared in 13 games and started one, posting eight tackles. He then totaled two tackles in nine games in 2020, and two tackles in five games in 2021. He entered the NCAA transfer portal after the season and ultimately transferred to the Texas Tech Red Raiders. In his first year at Texas Tech, Owens appeared in 12 games, started two, and had 19 tackles along with two forced fumbles and an interception. He returned to the team in 2023 and had a career-best 37 tackles with two pass breakups. Owens was invited to the East–West Shrine Bowl. At the NFL Combine, he recorded the best vertical jump among safeties and had a 12 feet 2 inches (3.71 m) broad jump, one inch short of the world record.

== Professional career ==
Pre-draft measurables
Height	Weight	Arm length	Hand span	Wingspan	Vertical jump	Broad jump
6 ft 2 3/8 in (1.89 m)	216 lb (98 kg)	33 3/8 in (0.85 m)	9 1/8 in (0.23 m)	6 ft 7 1/8 in (2.01 m)	41.0 in (1.04 m)	12 ft 2 in (3.71 m)
All values from NFL Combine

Owens signed with the Washington Commanders as an undrafted free agent in 2024. He was placed on injured reserve on January 4, 2025.

== Personal life ==
Owens received media attention for an interview at the 2024 NFL Combine where he said that he does not believe in outer space or other planets and found the Flat Earth theory presented "valid points". He attributed his beliefs to the Bible, saying "God created the heavens and Earth. He didn't create Jupiter and Saturn."
