= Joe Whitt Jr. =

American football coach (born 1978)

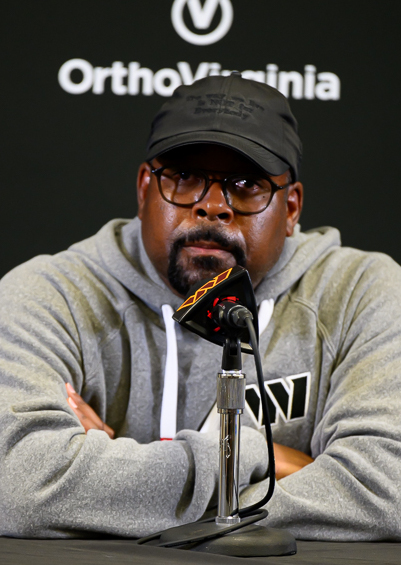
- Whitt with the Washington Commanders in 2025

Pittsburgh Steelers
- Title: Assistant head coach & secondary coach

Personal information
- Born: July 19, 1978 (age 48); Auburn, Alabama, U.S.

Career information
- Position: Wide receiver
- High school: Auburn (Auburn)
- College: Auburn (1998–2000)

Career history
- Auburn (2000–2001) Student assistant; The Citadel (2002) Wide receivers coach; Louisville (2003–2006) Cornerbacks coach & recruiting coordinator; Atlanta Falcons (2007) Assistant defensive backs coach; Green Bay Packers (2008–2018); Defensive quality control coach (2008); Cornerbacks coach (2009–2017); Pass game coordinator (2018); Cleveland Browns (2019) Pass game coordinator & secondary coach; Atlanta Falcons (2020) Pass game coordinator & secondary coach; Dallas Cowboys (2021–2023) Pass game coordinator & secondary coach; Washington Commanders (2024–2025) Defensive coordinator; Pittsburgh Steelers (2026–present) Assistant head coach & secondary coach

Awards and highlights
- Super Bowl champion (XLV)
- Coaching profile at Pro Football Reference

Joe Whitt Jr. (born July 19, 1978) is an American professional football coach who is the assistant head coach and secondary coach for the Pittsburgh Steelers of the National Football League (NFL). Whitt played college football as a wide receiver for the Auburn Tigers and has coached as an assistant for the NFL's Atlanta Falcons, Green Bay Packers, Cleveland Browns, and Dallas Cowboys. He served as defensive coordinator of the Washington Commanders from 2024 to 2025.

== Early life and education ==
Whitt was born on July 19, 1978, in Auburn, Alabama. He graduated from Auburn High School in 1997 and played college football for the Auburn Tigers football team as a wide receiver before earning a degree in communications in 2001.

== Career ==
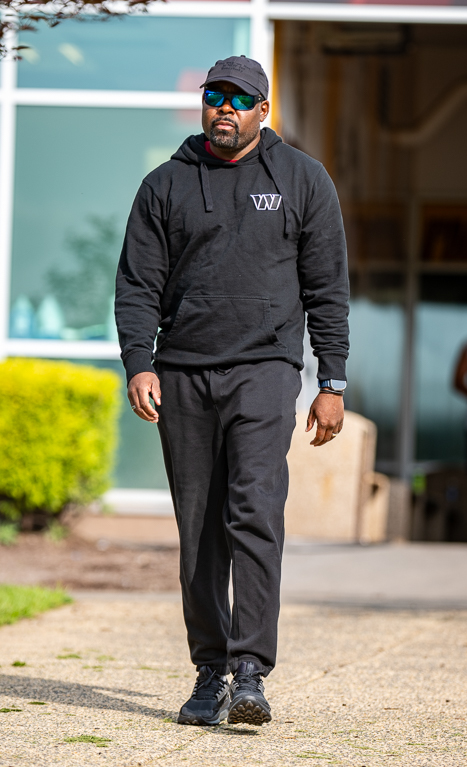
Whitt as Washington Commanders defensive coordinator, 2025

Whitt was hired as a student assistant for the Tigers after graduation. He worked as wide receivers coach at The Citadel in 2002 before joining Louisville the following year as a cornerbacks coach and recruiting coordinator under head coach Bobby Petrino. In 2007, Whitt followed Petrino when he was hired as head coach of the NFL's Atlanta Falcons, working as an assistant defensive backs coach before joining the Green Bay Packers in 2008 as a defensive quality control coach. He was promoted to cornerbacks coach in 2009. Under his coaching, Charles Woodson was named the 2009 Defensive Player of the Year. He was fired following the 2018 season, which he spent as a defensive passing game coordinator.

Whitt worked as the secondary coach and pass game coordinator for the Cleveland Browns in 2019 and Falcons in 2020. Serving as secondary coach and pass game coordinator, Whitt helped the Browns finish seventh in the league in pass defense. On January 9, 2020, the Atlanta Falcons hired Whitt as secondary coach. On January 13, 2021, Whitt joined the Dallas Cowboys for the same role. During his time with Dallas, he was credited with developing cornerbacks Trevon Diggs and DaRon Bland, with Diggs leading the NFL in interceptions in 2021 with 11 and Bland setting the single-season record for interceptions returned for a touchdown with five in 2023.

On February 5, 2024, Whitt was hired by the Washington Commanders as defensive coordinator under head coach Dan Quinn, who he had been working under since the Falcons in 2020. Whitt was the subject of criticism after a string of poor defensive performances during the 2025 season, including a four-game losing streak with the Commanders giving up 21 or more points. On November 10, 2025, Quinn announced that he took over defensive playcalling from Whitt. Whitt was fired following the season on January 6, 2026.

On February 4, 2026, Whitt was hired by the Pittsburgh Steelers as an assistant head coach and secondary coach under new head coach, Mike McCarthy. Whitt had previously worked under McCarthy for fourteen total seasons, eleven seasons during his time at Green Bay and three seasons during his time at Dallas.
