= 2026 Washington Commanders season =

95th season in franchise history

- Owner: Josh Harris
- General manager: Adam Peters
- President: Mark Clouse
- Head coach: Dan Quinn
- Offensive coordinator: David Blough
- Defensive coordinator: Daronte Jones
- Home stadium: Northwest Stadium

Results
- Record: 3–5–1
- Division place: 3rd NFC East

Uniform
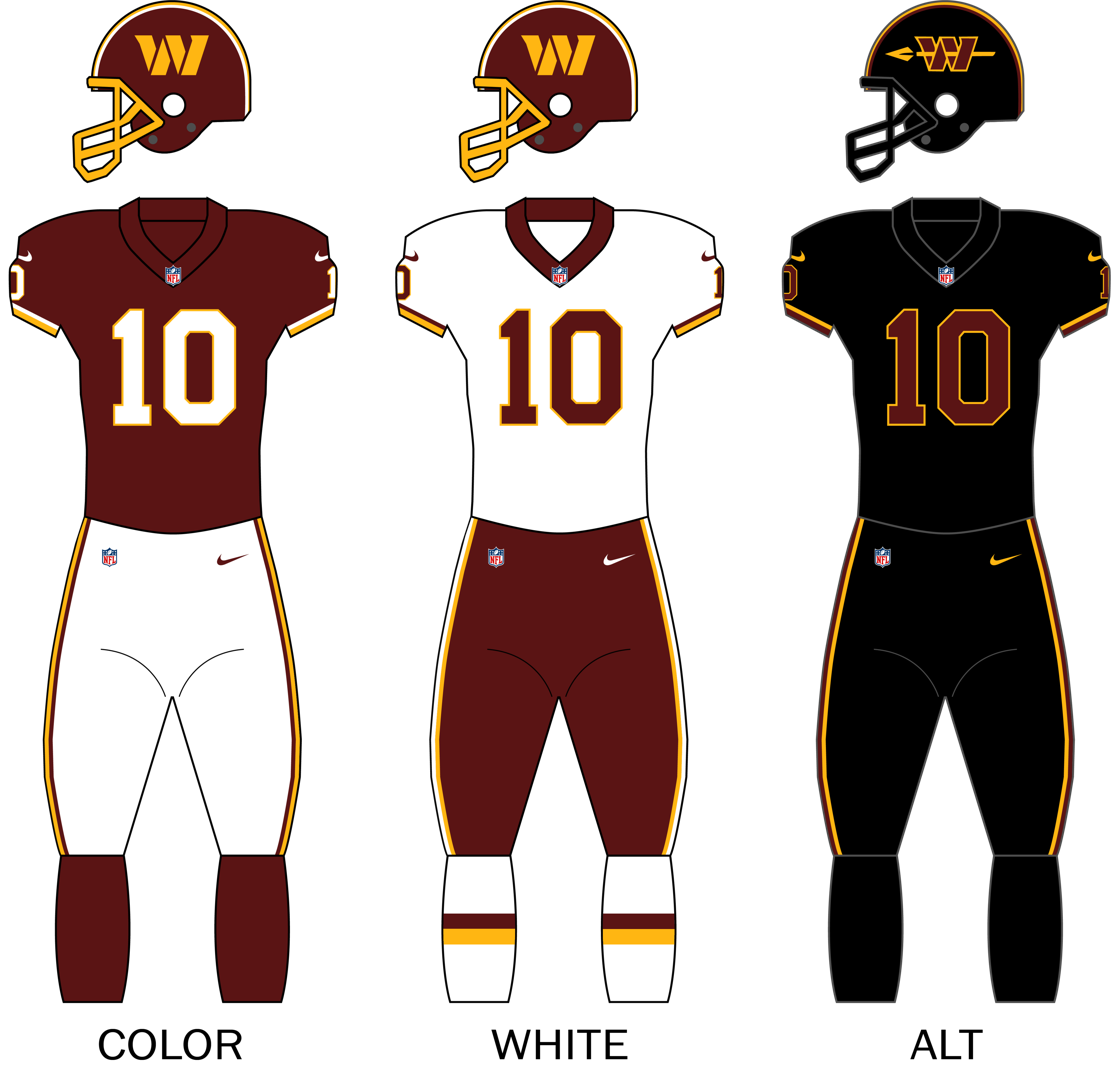

The 2026 season is the Washington Commanders' 95th in the National Football League (NFL) and their third under the tandem of general manager Adam Peters and head coach Dan Quinn. The Commanders will seek to improve upon their injury-riddled 5–12 record from the previous season, make the playoffs after a one-year absence, and end their five-year NFC East title drought. Following 2025, the Commanders fired offensive coordinator Kliff Kingsbury and defensive coordinator Joe Whitt Jr.. Assistant quarterbacks coach David Blough was promoted to offensive coordinator and former Minnesota Vikings defensive pass game coordinator Daronte Jones was hired as defensive coordinator. The Commanders unveiled new uniforms in the offseason, inspired by their Super Bowl era uniforms with a black alternate featuring an alternative speared logo.

== Draft ==
Player selections and trades
Round	Pick	Player	Position	College	Notes
1	7	Sonny Styles	LB	Ohio State	
2	38	Traded to the Houston Texans (Note: The Commanders traded second- and fourth-round selections (38th and 106th overall), and 2025 third- and seventh-round selections to the Houston Texans in exchange for a 2025 fourth-round selection and LT Laremy Tunsil.)			
3	71	Antonio Williams	WR	Clemson	
4	106	Traded to the Houston Texans			
5	147	Joshua Josephs	OLB	Tennessee	
6	187	Kaytron Allen	RB	Penn State	
6	209	Matt Gulbin	C	Michigan State	From 49ers (Note: The Commanders traded RB Brian Robinson Jr. to the San Francisco 49ers in exchange for a sixth-round selection (209th overall).)
7	223	Athan Kaliakmanis	QB	Rutgers	

== New players ==
Undrafted free agents
Name	Position	College
Jaden Bradley	WR	UNLV
Fred Davis II	CB	Northwestern
Robert Henry Jr.	RB	UTSA
Chris Hilton Jr.	WR	LSU
Jeffrey M'Ba	DT	SMU
Quentin Moore	TE	Washington
Malik Spencer	S	Michigan State
Drew Stevens	K	Iowa
Tanoa Togiai	G	Utah

Free agent signings
Name	Position	Previous Team
Odafe Oweh	OLB	Los Angeles Chargers
Rachaad White	RB	Tampa Bay Buccaneers
Leo Chenal	LB	Kansas City Chiefs
Amik Robertson	CB	Detroit Lions
K'Lavon Chaisson	OLB	New England Patriots
Chig Okonkwo	TE	Tennessee Titans
Tim Settle	DT	Houston Texans
Nick Cross	S	Indianapolis Colts
Charles Omenihu	DE	Kansas City Chiefs
Dyami Brown	WR	Jacksonville Jaguars
Van Jefferson	WR	Tennessee Titans
Jerome Ford	RB	Cleveland Browns
Ahkello Witherspoon	CB	Los Angeles Rams
Stefon Diggs	WR	New England Patriots
Foster Sarell	OT	Los Angeles Chargers

== Executives and coaches ==
Washington Commanders staff
Front office: Managing partner – Josh Harris; Limited partners – Mitchell Rales, Magic Johnson, Mark Ein; General manager – Adam Peters; Assistant general manager – Lance Newmark; Senior vice president of football operations – Brandon Sosna; Senior advisor to the general manager – Doug Williams; President – Mark Clouse; Vice president of football administration – Rob Rogers; Director of player personnel – David Blackburn; Director of college scouting – Ryan Kessenich; Director of pro scouting – Chris White; Senior personnel executive – Demitrius Washington; National scouts – Dwaune Jones, Jeff Beathard; Special advisor – Bob Myers; Head coach: Head coach – Dan Quinn; Offensive coaches: Offensive coordinator – David Blough; Offensive pass game coordinator – David Raih; Quarterbacks – D. J. Williams; Assistant quarterbacks – Danny Etling; Running backs – Anthony Lynn; Assistant running backs – Jesse Madden; Wide receivers – Bobby Engram; Assistant wide receivers/returners – Andre Coleman; Tight ends – Wes Welker; Offensive line – Darnell Stapleton; Assistant offensive line – Shane Toub; Offensive quality control – Brian Stoldt; Offensive assistant – Nick Charlton	Defensive coaches: Defensive coordinator – Daronte Jones; Defensive line/run game coordinator – Eric Henderson; Assistant defensive line – Darryl Tapp; Linebackers – Ken Norton Jr.; Outside linebackers – John Pagano; Assistant linebackers – George Banko; Cornerbacks – William Gay; Safeties – Tommy Donatell; Defensive quality control – Luke Johnson; Special teams coaches: Special teams coordinator – Larry Izzo; Assistant special teams – Brian Schneider, John Glenn; Support staff and coaches: Senior director of football operations – Bryan Porter; Senior director of team support and advancement – Dylan Thompson; Senior director of player health and performance – Geoff Kaplan; Head strength and conditioning – Chad Englehart; Head athletic trainer – Al Bellamy; Director of player performance – Brett Nenaber; Director of process innovation – Cody Cejda; Director of football solutions – Seenu Tulluri; Director of football R&D – Doug Drewry; Coaching chief of staff – Sarah Hogan; → Coaching staff → Front office → More NFL staffs

== Roster ==
Washington Commanders roster
Quarterbacks (QB): 5 Jayden Daniels; 16 Athan Kaliakmanis; 8 Marcus Mariota; Running backs (RB): 30 Austin Ekeler; 36 Robert Henry Jr.; 1 Rachaad White; Wide receivers (WR): 13 Treylon Burks; 3 Stefon Diggs; 12 Van Jefferson; 11 Luke McCaffrey KR; 14 Antonio Williams; Tight ends (TE): 87 John Bates; 85 Chig Okonkwo; 82 Ben Sinnott; 80 Colson Yankoff	Offensive linemen (OL): 67 Nick Allegretti C/G; 74 Brandon Coleman T/G; 72 Josh Conerly Jr. T; 76 Sam Cosmi G; 66 Matt Gulbin C; 63 Lucas Patrick C/G; 75 Chris Paul G; 62 Tanoa Togiai G; 71 Andrew Wylie T/G; Defensive linemen (DL): 50 Ricky Barber DT; 95 Jer'Zhan Newton DT; 90 Charles Omenihu DE; 97 Tim Settle DT; 96 Shy Tuttle DT; 91 Deatrich Wise Jr. DE	Linebackers (LB): 92 Dorance Armstrong OLB; 45 K'Lavon Chaisson OLB; 48 Joshua Josephs OLB; 51 Ale Kaho LB; 4 Frankie Luvu MLB; 58 Jordan Magee LB; 56 Kain Medrano MLB; 98 Odafe Oweh OLB; 52 Sonny Styles MLB; Defensive backs (DB): 23 Trey Amos CB; 35 Percy Butler S; 25 Nick Cross S; 29 Rasul Douglas CB; 20 Quan Martin S; 24 Fabian Moreau CB; 18 Tyler Owens S; 39 Jeremy Reaves S; 2 Amik Robertson CB; 0 Mike Sainristil CB; 37 Isaac Yiadom CB; Special teams (ST): 69 Tyler Ott LS; 19 Drew Stevens K; 10 Tress Way P	Practice squad: 86 Jaden Bradley WR; 55 Byron Cowart DT; 38 Fred Davis II CB; 88 Nick DeGennaro WR; 93 Daniel Ekuale DT; 61 Julian Good-Jones C/G; 15 Sam Hartman QB; 53 Kyle Kennard LB; 57 Austin Keys LB; 59 T. J. Maguranyanga DE (IPP); 40 Quentin Moore TE; 31 Devin Neal RB; 77 Esa Pole T; 32 Craig Reynolds RB; 73 Trent Scott T/G; 89 Jack Westover TE; Reserve: 6 Dyami Brown WR (IR); 54 Leo Chenal LB (IR); 22 Jacory Croskey-Merritt RB (IR); 41 Javontae Jean-Baptiste OLB (IR); 99 Javon Kinlaw DT (IR); 83 Jaylin Lane WR (IR); 17 Terry McLaurin WR (IR); 26 Jeremy McNichols RB (IR); 94 Daron Payne DT (IR); 78 Laremy Tunsil T (IR) 53 active, 15 practice squad (1 IPP), 10 reserve As of November 13, 2026. Rookies in italics.; Roster; Depth chart; Transactions

== Schedule ==
=== Preseason ===
Week	Date	Opponent	Result	Record	Venue	Recap
1	August 14	Miami Dolphins	**W** 20–7	1–0	Northwest Stadium	Recap
2	August 22	at Detroit Lions	**L** 13–17	1–1	Ford Field	Recap
3	August 28	at Baltimore Ravens	**L** 3–41	1–2	M&T Bank Stadium	Recap

=== Regular season ===
Week	Date	Time (ET)	Opponent	Result	Record	Venue	Network	Recap
1	September 13	4:25 p.m.	at **Philadelphia Eagles**	**L** 22–24	0–1	Lincoln Financial Field	Fox	Recap
2	September 20	4:25 p.m.	at **Dallas Cowboys**	**L** 20–37	0–2	AT&T Stadium	Fox	Recap
3	September 27	1:00 p.m.	Seattle Seahawks	**W** 33–31	1–2	Northwest Stadium	Fox	Recap
4	October 4	9:30 a.m.	Indianapolis Colts	**L** 13–30	1–3	Tottenham Hotspur Stadium (London)	NFLN	Recap
5	October 11	1:00 p.m.	**New York Giants**	**T** 27–27 (OT)	1–3–1	Northwest Stadium	Fox	Recap
6	October 19	8:15 p.m.	at San Francisco 49ers	**L** 17–23	1–4–1	Levi's Stadium	ESPN/ABC	Recap
7	Bye							
8	November 1	8:20 p.m.	**Philadelphia Eagles**	**W** 27–10	2–4–1	Northwest Stadium	NBC	Recap
9	November 8	1:00 p.m.	Los Angeles Rams	**L** 13–20	2–5–1	Northwest Stadium	Fox	Recap
10	November 12	8:15 p.m.	at **New York Giants**	**W** 24–21	3–5–1	MetLife Stadium	Prime Video	Recap
11	November 23	8:15 p.m.	Cincinnati Bengals			Northwest Stadium	ESPN	
12	November 29	4:25 p.m.	at Arizona Cardinals			State Farm Stadium	Fox	
13	December 6	1:00 p.m.	at Tennessee Titans			Nissan Stadium	CBS	
14	December 13	1:00 p.m.	Houston Texans			Northwest Stadium	CBS	
15	December 20	1:00 p.m.	Atlanta Falcons			Northwest Stadium	Fox	
16	December 26/27	TBD	at Minnesota Vikings			U.S. Bank Stadium	TBD	
17	January 2/3	TBD	at Jacksonville Jaguars			EverBank Stadium	TBD	
18	January 9/10	TBD	**Dallas Cowboys**			Northwest Stadium	TBD	

Notes

- Intra-division opponents are in **bold** text.
- Networks, dates and times from Weeks 13–15 are subject to change as a result of flexible scheduling.
- The date, time, and network for games in Weeks 16 and 17 will be finalized by no later than two weeks prior to each game.
- The date, time, and network for Week 18 will be finalized at the end of Week 17.

==== Week 1: at Philadelphia Eagles ====
Week 1: Washington Commanders at Philadelphia Eagles – Game summary

Quarter	1	2	3	4	Total
Commanders	3	6	0	13	**22**
**Eagles**	0	14	3	7	**24**

at Lincoln Financial Field, Philadelphia, Pennsylvania

- Date: September 13
- Game time: 4:25 p.m. EDT
- Game weather: Clear, 82 °F (28 °C)
- Game attendance: 69,879
- Referee: Shawn Smith
- TV announcers (Fox): Kevin Burkhardt, Tom Brady, Erin Andrews, and Tom Rinaldi
- Recap, Game Book

Game information

**First quarter**

- WSH – Drew Stevens 55-yard field goal, 11:23. Commanders 3–0. **Drive: 8 plays, 27 yards, 3:37.**

**Second quarter**

- PHI – Dallas Goedert 17-yard pass from Jalen Hurts (Jake Elliott kick), 14:11. Eagles 7–3. **Drive: 5 plays, 76 yards, 3:27.**
- PHI – Dontayvion Wicks 9-yard pass from Jalen Hurts (Jake Elliott kick), 6:27. Eagles 14–3. **Drive: 5 plays, 62 yards, 2:19.**
- WSH – Jacory Croskey-Merritt 1-yard run (kick blocked), 1:50. Eagles 14–9. **Drive: 12 plays, 67 yards, 4:34.**

**Third quarter**

- PHI – Jake Elliott 35-yard field goal, 0:44. Eagles 17–9. **Drive: 7 plays, 43 yards, 3:00.**

**Fourth quarter**

- WSH – Stefon Diggs 10-yard pass from Jayden Daniels (Drew Stevens kick), 9:59. Eagles 17–16. **Drive: 9 plays, 67 yards, 5:45.**
- PHI – Dallas Goedert 43-yard pass from Jalen Hurts (Jake Elliott kick), 6:02. Eagles 24–16. **Drive: 8 plays, 74 yards, 3:57.**
- WSH – Antonio Williams 1-yard pass from Jayden Daniels (pass failed), 1:01. Eagles 24–22. **Drive: 12 plays, 63 yards, 5:01.**

**Top passers**

- WSH – Jayden Daniels – 18/34, 164 yards, 2 TD
- PHI – Jalen Hurts – 14/25, 203 yards, 3 TD

**Top rushers**

- WSH – Jacory Croskey-Merritt – 16 rushes, 63 yards, TD
- PHI – Saquon Barkley – 15 rushes, 83 yards

**Top receivers**

- WSH – Antonio Williams – 4 receptions, 64 yards, TD
- PHI – Dallas Goedert – 4 receptions, 77 yards, 2 TD

==== Week 2: at Dallas Cowboys ====
Week 2: Washington Commanders at Dallas Cowboys – Game summary

Quarter	1	2	3	4	Total
Commanders	0	10	3	7	**20**
**Cowboys**	10	7	10	10	**37**

at AT&T Stadium, Arlington, Texas

- Date: September 20
- Game time: 4:25 p.m. EDT/3:25 p.m. CDT
- Game weather: None (retractable roof closed)
- Game attendance: 93,188
- Referee: Shawn Hochuli
- TV announcers (Fox): Kevin Burkhardt, Tom Brady, Erin Andrews, and Tom Rinaldi
- Recap, Game Book

Game information

**First quarter**

- DAL – CeeDee Lamb 3-yard pass from Dak Prescott (Brandon Aubrey kick), 10:01. Cowboys 7–0. **Drive: 10 plays, 66 yards, 4:59.**
- DAL – Brandon Aubrey 25-yard field goal, 5:01. Cowboys 10–0. **Drive: 8 plays, 58 yards, 3:04.**

**Second quarter**

- WSH – Drew Stevens 27-yard field goal, 13:14. Cowboys 10–3. **Drive: 13 plays, 73 yards, 6:47.**
- DAL – Jake Ferguson 10-yard pass from Dak Prescott (Brandon Aubrey kick), 9:55. Cowboys 17–3. **Drive: 7 plays, 65 yards, 3:19.**
- WSH – Stefon Diggs 4-yard pass from Jayden Daniels (Drew Stevens kick), 6:37. Cowboys 17–10. **Drive: 8 plays, 66 yards, 3:18.**

**Third quarter**

- WSH – Drew Stevens 47-yard field goal, 12:50. Cowboys 17–13. **Drive: 6 plays, 31 yards, 2:10.**
- DAL – Brandon Aubrey 44-yard field goal, 7:20. Cowboys 20–13. **Drive: 9 plays, 38 yards, 5:30.**
- DAL – Jake Ferguson 12-yard pass from Dak Prescott (Brandon Aubrey kick), 6:32. Cowboys 27–13. **Drive: 2 plays, 13 yards, 0:36.**

**Fourth quarter**

- DAL – Brandon Aubrey 60-yard field goal, 13:22. Cowboys 30–13. **Drive: 7 plays, 17 yards, 3:31.**
- WSH – Stefon Diggs 20-yard pass from Marcus Mariota (Drew Stevens kick), 9:03. Cowboys 30–20. **Drive: 10 plays, 73 yards, 4:19.**
- DAL – CeeDee Lamb 24-yard pass from Dak Prescott (Brandon Aubrey kick), 3:07. Cowboys 37–20. **Drive: 11 plays, 83 yards, 5:56.**

**Top passers**

- WSH – Marcus Mariota – 11/16, 111 yards, TD
- DAL – Dak Prescott – 26/31, 279 yards, 4 TD

**Top rushers**

- WSH – Jayden Daniels – 7 rushes, 69 yards
- DAL – Javonte Williams – 12 rushes, 30 yards

**Top receivers**

- WSH – Terry McLaurin – 2 receptions, 50 yards
- DAL – CeeDee Lamb – 8 receptions, 153 yards, 2 TD

In the last minute of the first half, quarterback Jayden Daniels sustained a dislocated elbow. This marked the Commanders' second straight loss in Dallas, as well as the fifth consecutive season where they failed to sweep the Cowboys. They started 0–2 for the first time since 2019 when they were known as the Redskins.

==== Week 3: vs. Seattle Seahawks ====
Week 3: Seattle Seahawks at Washington Commanders – Game summary

Quarter	1	2	3	4	Total
Seahawks	0	10	7	14	**31**
**Commanders**	7	10	7	9	**33**

at Northwest Stadium, Landover, Maryland

- Date: September 27
- Game time: 1:00 p.m. EDT
- Game weather: Rain, 63 °F (17 °C)
- Game attendance: 64,027
- Referee: Carl Cheffers
- TV announcers (Fox): Joe Davis, Greg Olsen, and Pam Oliver
- Recap, Game Book

Game information

**First quarter**

- WSH – Rachaad White 6-yard pass from Marcus Mariota (Drew Stevens kick), 9:08. Commanders 7–0. **Drive: 4 plays, 21 yards, 1:52.**

**Second quarter**

- SEA – Jaxon Smith-Njigba 1-yard pass from Sam Darnold (Jason Myers kick), 13:27. Tied 7–7. **Drive: 9 plays, 90 yards, 4:58.**
- WSH – Treylon Burks 11-yard pass from Marcus Mariota (Drew Stevens kick), 6:47. Commanders 14–7. **Drive: 8 plays, 60 yards, 3:34.**
- SEA – Jason Myers 57-yard field goal, 0:52. Commanders 14–10. **Drive: 4 plays, 2 yards, 0:21.**
- WSH – Drew Stevens 57-yard field goal, 0:00. Commanders 17–10. **Drive: 5 plays, 26 yards, 0:52.**

**Third quarter**

- WSH – Terry McLaurin 30-yard pass from Marcus Mariota (Drew Stevens kick), 10:43. Commanders 24–10. **Drive: 3 plays, 43 yards, 1:19.**
- SEA – Eric Saubert 13-yard pass from Sam Darnold (Jason Myers kick), 6:05. Commanders 24–17. **Drive: 8 plays, 60 yards, 4:38.**

**Fourth quarter**

- SEA – Jaxon Smith-Njigba 11-yard pass from Sam Darnold (Jason Myers kick), 11:53. Tied 24–24. **Drive: 7 plays, 80 yards, 4:19.**
- WSH – Drew Stevens 36-yard field goal, 4:34. Commanders 27–24. **Drive: 12 plays, 42 yards, 7:19.**
- WSH – Kain Medrano 50-yard interception return (kick failed), 3:57. Commanders 33–24.
- SEA – Cooper Kupp 7-yard pass from Sam Darnold (Jason Myers kick), 2:51. Commanders 33–31. **Drive: 5 plays, 68 yards, 1:06.**

**Top passers**

- SEA – Sam Darnold – 31/45, 379 yards, 4 TD, 2 INT
- WSH – Marcus Mariota – 19/31, 183 yards, 3 TD

**Top rushers**

- SEA – Jadarian Price – 5 rushes, 15 yards
- WSH – Jacory Croskey-Merritt – 19 rushes, 36 yards

**Top receivers**

- SEA – Jaxon Smith-Njigba – 10 receptions, 128 yards, 2 TD
- WSH – Terry McLaurin – 6 receptions, 77 yards, TD

The upset win marked the Commanders' first win against the Seahawks since 2021.

==== Week 4: vs. Indianapolis Colts ====
NFL London games

Week 4: Indianapolis Colts at Washington Commanders – Game summary

Quarter	1	2	3	4	Total
**Colts**	0	10	10	10	**30**
Commanders	6	0	7	0	**13**

at Tottenham Hotspur Stadium, London, England

- Date: October 4
- Game time: 2:30 p.m. BST/9:30 a.m. EDT
- Game weather: Partly cloudy, 70 °F (21 °C)
- Game attendance: 60,907
- Referee: Alan Eck
- TV announcers (WUSA/NFLN): Dave Pasch, Kurt Warner, Jason Kelce, and Molly McGrath
- Recap, Game Book

Game information

**First quarter**

- WSH – Drew Stevens 31-yard field goal, 12:57. Commanders 3–0. **Drive: 4 plays, 8 yards, 1:41.**
- WSH – Drew Stevens 29-yard field goal, 6:21. Commanders 6–0. **Drive: 8 plays, 70 yards, 4:18.**

**Second quarter**

- IND – Jonathan Taylor 5-yard run (Spencer Shrader kick), 3:23. Colts 7–6. **Drive: 9 plays, 46 yards, 5:07.**
- IND – Spencer Shrader 48-yard field goal, 0:00. Colts 10–6. **Drive: 8 plays, 51 yards, 1:09.**

**Third quarter**

- IND – Jonathan Taylor 5-yard run (Spencer Shrader kick), 12:45. Colts 17–6. **Drive: 4 plays, 20 yards, 1:24.**
- WSH – Treylon Burks 47-yard pass from Athan Kaliakmanis (Drew Stevens kick), 10:39. Colts 17–13. **Drive: 5 plays, 70 yards, 2:06.**
- IND – Spencer Shrader 36-yard field goal, 7:03. Colts 20–13. **Drive: 7 plays, 32 yards, 3:36.**

**Fourth quarter**

- IND – Daniel Jones 4-yard run (Spencer Shrader kick), 11:38. Colts 27–13. **Drive: 9 plays, 52 yards, 4:57.**
- IND – Spencer Shrader 44-yard field goal, 5:48. Colts 30–13. **Drive: 5 plays, 20 yards, 2:22.**

**Top passers**

- IND – Daniel Jones – 19/34, 143 yards, INT
- WSH – Athan Kaliakmanis – 15/33, 186 yards, TD, INT

**Top rushers**

- IND – Jonathan Taylor – 20 rushes, 95 yards, 2 TD
- WSH – Marcus Mariota – 1 rush, 35 yards

**Top receivers**

- IND – LaQuon Treadwell – 5 receptions, 42 yards
- WSH – Dyami Brown – 3 receptions, 65 yards

==== Week 5: vs. New York Giants ====
Week 5: New York Giants at Washington Commanders – Game summary

Quarter	1	2	3	4	OT	Total
Giants	3	0	10	14	0	**27**
Commanders	6	6	7	8	0	**27**

at Northwest Stadium, Landover, Maryland

- Date: October 11
- Game time: 1:00 p.m. EDT
- Game weather: Rain, 64 °F (18 °C)
- Game attendance: 64,195
- Referee: Clete Blakeman
- TV announcers (Fox): Chris Myers, Jonathan Vilma, and Megan Olivi
- Recap, Game Book

Game information

**First quarter**

- WSH – Jacory Croskey-Merritt 33-yard run (kick failed), 13:00. Commanders 6–0. **Drive: 4 plays, 69 yards, 2:00.**
- NYG – Dominic Zvada 51-yard field goal, 0:55. Commanders 6–3. **Drive: 5 plays, 22 yards, 1:40.**

**Second quarter**

- WSH – Drew Stevens 28-yard field goal, 8:57. Commanders 9–3. **Drive: 14 plays, 63 yards, 6:58.**
- WSH – Drew Stevens 40-yard field goal, 1:02. Commanders 12–3. **Drive: 4 plays, 5 yards, 0:56.**

**Third quarter**

- NYG – Dominic Zvada 56-yard field goal, 10:54. Commanders 12–6. **Drive: 7 plays, 30 yards, 4:06.**
- WSH – Jayden Daniels 38-yard run (Drew Stevens kick), 7:47. Commanders 19–6. **Drive: 5 plays, 77 yards, 3:07.**
- NYG – Isaiah Likely 3-yard pass from Jameis Winston (Dominic Zvada kick), 0:44. Commanders 19–13. **Drive: 13 plays, 63 yards, 7:03.**

**Fourth quarter**

- WSH – Jayden Daniels 26-yard run (Jayden Daniels–Terry McLaurin pass), 11:05. Commanders 27–13. **Drive: 8 plays, 81 yards, 4:39.**
- NYG – Isaiah Likely 17-yard pass from Jameis Winston (Dominic Zvada kick), 7:20. Commanders 27–20. **Drive: 9 plays, 75 yards, 3:45.**
- NYG – Malik Nabers 17-yard pass from Jameis Winston (Dominic Zvada kick), 1:43. Tied 27–27. **Drive: 10 plays, 72 yards, 3:13.**

**Overtime**

- No scoring plays

**Top passers**

- NYG – Jameis Winston – 33/54, 326 yards, 3 TD
- WSH – Jayden Daniels – 17/25, 199 yards

**Top rushers**

- NYG – Cam Skattebo – 13 rushes, 59 yards
- WSH – Jayden Daniels – 9 rushes, 103 yards, 2 TD

**Top receivers**

- NYG – Malik Nabers – 11 receptions, 121 yards
- WSH – Terry McLaurin – 4 receptions, 62 yards

This marked the Commanders' first tie game since 2022, which was also against the Giants, and snapped their four-game winning streak over New York.

Both quarterback Jayden Daniels and head coach Dan Quinn were heavily criticized following the tie, with many fans and analysts calling for Quinn's firing. With the tie, the Commanders fell to 1–3–1.

==== Week 6: at San Francisco 49ers ====
Week 6: Washington Commanders at San Francisco 49ers – Game summary

Quarter	1	2	3	4	Total
Commanders	3	0	7	7	**17**
**49ers**	13	7	3	0	**23**

at Levi's Stadium, Santa Clara, California

- Date: October 19
- Game time: 8:15 p.m. EDT/5:15 p.m. PDT
- Game weather: Fair, 64 °F (18 °C)
- Game attendance: 71,561
- Referee: Adrian Hill
- TV announcers (ESPN/ABC): Joe Buck, Troy Aikman, and Lisa Salters
- Recap, Game Book

Game information

**First quarter**

- SF – George Kittle 11-yard pass from Brock Purdy (Eddy Pineiro kick), 10:53. 49ers 7–0. **Drive: 9 plays, 64 yards, 4:07.**
- WSH – Drew Stevens 51-yard field goal, 8:48. 49ers 7–3. **Drive: 5 plays, 32 yards, 2:05.**
- SF – Christian McCaffrey 1-yard rush (kick failed), 4:09. 49ers 13–3. **Drive: 8 plays, 72 yards, 4:39.**

**Second quarter**

- SF – Christian McCaffrey 1-yard rush (Eddy Pineiro kick), 4:09. 49ers 20–3. **Drive: 14 plays, 69 yards, 6:13.**

**Third quarter**

- SF – Eddy Pineiro 33-yard field goal, 5:56. 49ers 23–3. **Drive: 11 plays, 65 yards, 5:41.**
- WSH – Stefon Diggs 1-yard pass from Jayden Daniels (Drew Stevens kick), 0:15. 49ers 23–10. **Drive: 11 plays, 65 yards, 5:41.**

**Fourth quarter**

- WSH – Rachaad White 9-yard pass from Jayden Daniels (Drew Stevens kick), 9:22. 49ers 23–17. **Drive: 10 plays, 80 yards, 4:43.**

**Top passers**

- WSH – Jayden Daniels – 39/40, 300 yards, 2 TD
- SF – Brock Purdy – 21/29, 264 yards, TD

**Top rushers**

- WSH – Rachaad White – 7 rushes, 27 yards
- SF – Christian McCaffrey – 16 rushes, 64 yards, 2 TD

**Top receivers**

- WSH – Chig Okonkwo – 7 receptions, 69 yards
- SF – Mike Evans – 3 receptions, 94 yards

==== Week 8: vs. Philadelphia Eagles ====
Week 8: Philadelphia Eagles at Washington Commanders – Game summary

Quarter	1	2	3	4	Total
Eagles	10	0	0	0	**10**
**Commanders**	3	10	3	11	**27**

at Northwest Stadium, Landover, Maryland

- Date: November 1
- Game time: 8:20 p.m. EST
- Game weather: Fair, 51 °F (11 °C)
- Game attendance: 64,195
- Referee: Shawn Hochuli
- TV announcers (NBC): Mike Tirico, Cris Collinsworth, and Melissa Stark
- Recap, Game Book

Game information

**First quarter**

- PHI – Jake Elliott 40-yard field goal, 6:10. Eagles 3–0. **Drive: 7 plays, 40 yards, 3:30.**
- PHI – Saquon Barkley 3-yard rush (Jake Elliott kick), 4:27. Eagles 10–0. **Drive: 3 plays, 26 yards, 1:02.**
- WSH – Drew Stevens 56-yard field goal, 0:28. Eagles 10–3. **Drive: 10 plays, 27 yards, 3:59.**

**Second quarter**

- WSH – Stefon Diggs 8-yard pass from Jayden Daniels (Drew Stevens kick), 4:56. Tied 10–10. **Drive: 11 plays, 89 yards, 5:50.**
- WSH – Drew Stevens 39-yard field goal, 0:19. Commanders 13–10. **Drive: 5 plays, 29 yards, 0:31.**

**Third quarter**

- WSH – Drew Stevens 25-yard field goal, 1:33. Commanders 16–10. **Drive: 5 plays, 53 yards, 1:18.**

**Fourth quarter**

- WSH – Drew Stevens 42-yard field goal, 3:43. Commanders 19–10. **Drive: 8 plays, 45 yards, 5:15.**
- WSH – Rachaad White 1-yard rush (Austin Ekeler run), 0:28. Commanders 27–10. **Drive: 3 plays, 37 yards, 0:26.**

**Top passers**

- PHI – Tanner McKee – 23/34, 212 yards, INT
- WSH – Jayden Daniels – 16/29, 217 yards, TD

**Top rushers**

- PHI – Elijah Mitchell – 11 rushes, 34 yards
- WSH – Rachaad White – 11 rush, 55 yards, TD

**Top receivers**

- PHI – Makai Lemon – 6 receptions, 57 yards
- WSH – Treylon Burks – 3 receptions, 81 yards

This marked the first Sunday Night Football game since Browns versus Dolphins in 2004 to feature two teams below .300.

==== Week 9: vs. Los Angeles Rams ====
Week 9: Los Angeles Rams at Washington Commanders – Game summary

Quarter	1	2	3	4	Total
**Rams**	3	3	7	7	**20**
Commanders	3	7	3	0	**13**

at Northwest Stadium, Landover, Maryland

- Date: November 8
- Game time: 1:00 p.m. EST
- Game weather: Sunny, 59 °F (15 °C)
- Game attendance: 64,016
- Referee: John Hussey
- TV announcers (Fox): Chris Myers, Mark Schlereth, and Jen Hale
- Recap, Game Book

Game information

**First quarter**

- WSH – Drew Stevens 37-yard field goal, 9:07. Commanders 3–0. **Drive: 11 plays, 48 yards, 5:53.**
- LAR – Brandon McManus 33-yard field goal, 2:10. Tied 3–3. **Drive: 14 plays, 51 yards, 6:57.**

**Second quarter**

- WSH – Van Jefferson 7-yard pass from Jayden Daniels (Drew Stevens kick), 14:00. Commanders 10–3. **Drive: 6 plays, 80 yards, 3:10.**
- LAR – Brandon McManus 20-yard field goal, 0:00. Commanders 10–6. **Drive: 10 plays, 43 yards, 2:07.**

**Third quarter**

- LAR – Blake Corum 1-yard run (Brandon McManus kick), 11:29. Rams 13–10. **Drive: 8 plays, 69 yards, 3:31.**
- WSH – Drew Stevens 41-yard field goal, 3:24. Tied 13–13. **Drive: 4 plays, 4 yards, 2:33.**

**Fourth quarter**

- LAR – Puka Nacua 7-yard pass from Matthew Stafford (Brandon McManus kick), 12:51. Rams 20–13. **Drive: 12 plays, 65 yards, 5:33.**

**Top passers**

- LAR – Matthew Stafford – 26/43, 228 yards, TD, INT
- WSH – Jayden Daniels – 24/35, 274 yards, TD

**Top rushers**

- LAR – Blake Corum – 11 rushes, 58 yards, TD
- WSH – Rachaad White – 7 rushes, 28 yards

**Top receivers**

- LAR – Puka Nacua – 14 receptions, 150 yards, TD
- WSH – Van Jefferson – 5 receptions, 58 yards, TD

==== Week 10: at New York Giants ====
Week 10: Washington Commanders at New York Giants – Game summary

Quarter	1	2	3	4	Total
**Commanders**	0	10	7	7	**24**
Giants	0	7	7	7	**21**

at MetLife Stadium, East Rutherford, New Jersey

- Date: November 12
- Game time: 8:15 p.m. EST
- Game weather: Light rain, 48 °F (9 °C)
- Game attendance: 80,450
- Referee: Brad Rogers
- TV announcers (Prime Video): Al Michaels, Kirk Herbstreit, and Kaylee Hartung
  Game exclusive to WTTG and WNYW.
- Recap, Game Book

Game information

**First quarter**

- No scoring plays

**Second quarter**

- WSH – Drew Stevens 46-yard field goal, 14:07. Commanders 3–0. **Drive: 11 plays, 49 yards, 4:57.**
- NYG – Cam Skattebo 1-yard run (Dominic Zvada kick), 2:35. Giants 7–3. **Drive: 16 plays, 72 yards, 7:48.**
- WSH – Ben Sinnott 1-yard pass from Jayden Daniels (Drew Stevens kick), 0:05. Commanders 10–7. **Drive: 9 plays, 67 yards, 2:30.**

**Third quarter**

- NYG – Cam Skattebo 13-yard run (Dominic Zvada kick), 10:22. Giants 14–10. **Drive: 5 plays, 55 yards, 2:02.**
- WSH – Antonio Williams 31-yard pass from Jayden Daniels (Drew Stevens kick), 6:56. Commanders 17–14. **Drive: 6 plays, 77 yards, 3:26.**

**Fourth quarter**

- NYG – Isaiah Likely 66-yard pass from J. J. McCarthy (Dominic Zvada kick), 8:13. Giants 21–17. **Drive: 3 plays, 69 yards, 0:51.**
- WSH – Stefon Diggs 32-yard pass from Jayden Daniels (Drew Stevens kick), 0:57. Commanders 24–21. **Drive: 3 plays, 71 yards, 0:49.**

**Top passers**

- WSH – Jayden Daniels – 23/33, 249 yards, 3 TD, 2 INT
- NYG – J. J. McCarthy – 23/36, 293 yards, TD, INT

**Top rushers**

- WSH – Rachaad White – 11 rushes, 47 yards
- NYG – Cam Skattebo – 18 rushes, 78 yards, 2 TD

**Top receivers**

- WSH – Stefon Diggs – 6 receptions, 83 yards, TD
- NYG – Isaiah Likely – 9 receptions, 127 yards, TD

==== Week 11: vs. Cincinnati Bengals ====
Week 11: Cincinnati Bengals at Washington Commanders – Game summary

Quarter	1	2	3	4	Total
Bengals	0	0	0	0	**0**
Commanders	0	0	0	0	**0**

at Northwest Stadium, Landover, Maryland

- Date: November 23
- Game time: 8:15 p.m. EST
- Referee: Bill Vinovich
- TV announcers (ESPN): Joe Buck, Troy Aikman, and Lisa Salters
- Preview

== Standings ==
=== Division ===
NFC East
	W	L	T	PCT	DIV	CONF	PF	PA	STK
New York Giants	5	3	1	.611	2–1–1	3–3–1	203	196	L1
Dallas Cowboys	4	6	0	.400	2–1	2–5	286	282	L1
Washington Commanders	3	5	1	.389	2–2–1	3–4–1	196	223	W1
Philadelphia Eagles	2	7	0	.222	1–3	1–6	148	221	L7

=== Conference ===
NFC
Seed	Team	Division	W	L	T	PCT	DIV	CONF	SOS	SOV	STK
Division leaders
1	San Francisco 49ers	West	8	1	0	.889	3–0	5–1	.431	.448	W2
2 (Note: Detroit wins tie break over Minnesota and Chicago based on head-to-head record.)	Detroit Lions	North	7	2	0	.778	2–0	4–1	.459	.403	W5
3	New York Giants	East	5	3	1	.611	2–1–1	3–3–1	.345	.277	L1
4	Carolina Panthers	South	4	5	0	.444	2–1	4–3	.524	.405	W1
Wild cards
5 (Note: Minnesota wins tie break over Chicago based on head-to-head victory.)	Minnesota Vikings	North	7	2	0	.778	3–1	5–1	.524	.439	W1
6	Chicago Bears	North	7	2	0	.778	0–2	5–2	.442	.373	W4
7 (Note: Green Bay wins tie break over Seattle based on conference record. Division tie break was initially used to eliminate LA Rams (see below).)	Green Bay Packers	North	6	4	0	.600	1–3	4–4	.521	.439	L1
In the hunt
8 (Note: Seattle wins tie break over LA Rams based on division record.)	Seattle Seahawks	West	6	4	0	.600	2–1	2–3	.516	.397	W2
9	Los Angeles Rams	West	6	4	0	.600	1–2	4–2	.484	.339	W4
10	Dallas Cowboys	East	4	6	0	.400	2–1	2–5	.436	.311	L1
11	Washington Commanders	East	3	5	1	.389	2–2–1	3–4–1	.494	.482	W1
12 (Note: Tampa Bay wins tie break over New Orleans based on division record.)	Tampa Bay Buccaneers	South	3	6	0	.333	2–0	3–3	.588	.379	L1
13	New Orleans Saints	South	3	6	0	.333	0–2	1–4	.547	.534	L1
14 (Note: Atlanta wins tie break over Arizona based on conference record.)	Atlanta Falcons	South	3	7	0	.300	1–2	3–3	.598	.607	L3
15	Arizona Cardinals	West	3	7	0	.300	1–4	2–6	.595	.379	L2
16	Philadelphia Eagles	East	2	7	0	.222	1–3	1–6	.500	.250	L7
