= Terry McLaurin =

American football player (born 1995)

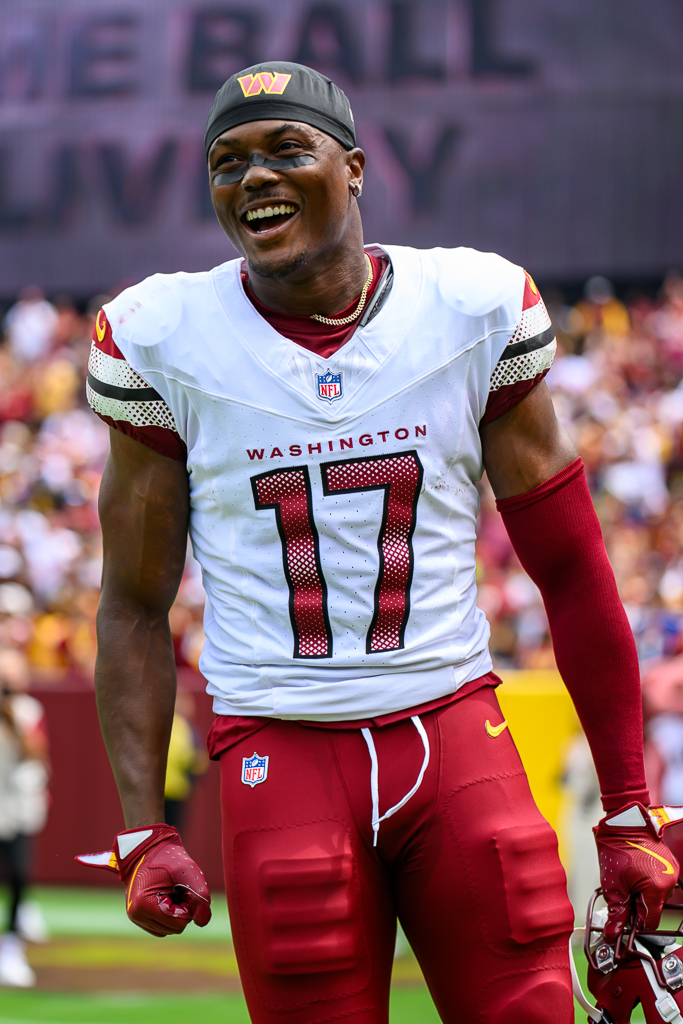
- McLaurin with the Washington Commanders in 2025

No. 17 – Washington Commanders
- Position: Wide receiver
- Roster status: Injured reserve

Personal information
- Born: September 15, 1995 (age 31); Indianapolis, Indiana, U.S.
- Listed height: 6 ft 0 in (1.83 m)
- Listed weight: 210 lb (95 kg)

Career information
- High school: Cathedral (Indianapolis)
- College: Ohio State (2014–2018)
- NFL draft: 2019: 3rd round, 76th overall pick

Career history
- Washington Redskins / Football Team / Commanders (2019–present)

Awards and highlights
- Second-team All-Pro (2024); 2× Pro Bowl (2022, 2024); PFWA All-Rookie Team (2019); CFP national champion (2015)

Career NFL statistics as of 2026
- Receptions: 513
- Receiving yards: 7,191
- Receiving touchdowns: 42
- Stats at Pro Football Reference

Terry McLaurin (born September 15, 1995) is an American professional football wide receiver for the Washington Commanders of the National Football League (NFL). McLaurin played college football for the Ohio State Buckeyes and was selected by Washington in the third round of the 2019 NFL draft. He earned second-team All-Pro honors in 2024 and set a Commanders record for most touchdown catches in a season with 13.

== Early life ==
McLaurin was born on September 15, 1995, in Indianapolis, Indiana. He won the state's Mr. Football Award in 2013 while playing football for Cathedral High School. McLaurin was regarded as a four-star recruit in the class of 2014 according to the 247Sports Composite.

== College career ==
McLaurin redshirted his freshman season in 2014. As a redshirt freshman for the Ohio State Buckeyes in 2015, McLaurin appeared in six games and recorded seven tackles and a fumble recovery. As a sophomore in 2016, he recorded 11 receptions for 114 yards and two touchdowns in 13 games. As a junior in 2017, he recorded 29 receptions for 436 receiving yards and six receiving touchdowns in 13 games. As a senior in 2018, he recorded 35 receptions for 701 yards and 11 touchdowns. He led the Big Ten in yards per reception.

== Professional career ==
Pre-draft measurables
Height	Weight	Arm length	Hand span	Wingspan	40-yard dash	10-yard split	20-yard split	20-yard shuttle	Three-cone drill	Vertical jump	Broad jump	Bench press
6 ft 0 1/8 in (1.83 m)	208 lb (94 kg)	31 1/2 in (0.80 m)	9 1/8 in (0.23 m)	6 ft 3 in (1.91 m)	4.35 s	1.45 s	2.59 s	4.15 s	7.01 s	37.5 in (0.95 m)	10 ft 5 in (3.18 m)	18 reps
All values from the NFL Combine

=== 2019 ===
McLaurin was drafted by the Washington Redskins in the third round (76th overall) of the 2019 NFL draft. With their first-round pick in the same draft, the Redskins also drafted McLaurin's college quarterback, Dwayne Haskins. He signed his four-year rookie contract on June 6, 2019.

Due to a strong training camp performance, McLaurin was named a Week 1 starter. McLaurin made his NFL debut in the opening game of the 2019 season against the Philadelphia Eagles. There, he recorded five receptions for 125 yards, including a 69-yard touchdown. He added to that by catching at least five passes and a touchdown over the next two games, making him the first player in league history to achieve such a feat in their first three career appearances.

In Week 6 against the Miami Dolphins, McLaurin caught four receptions for 100 yards and two touchdowns as the Redskins won their first game of the season. During Week 15 against the Eagles, McLaurin finished with five receptions for 130 receiving yards, including a 75-yard touchdown. He finished the season with 58 receptions for 919 yards and seven touchdowns and was named to the PFWA All-Rookie Team.

=== 2020 ===
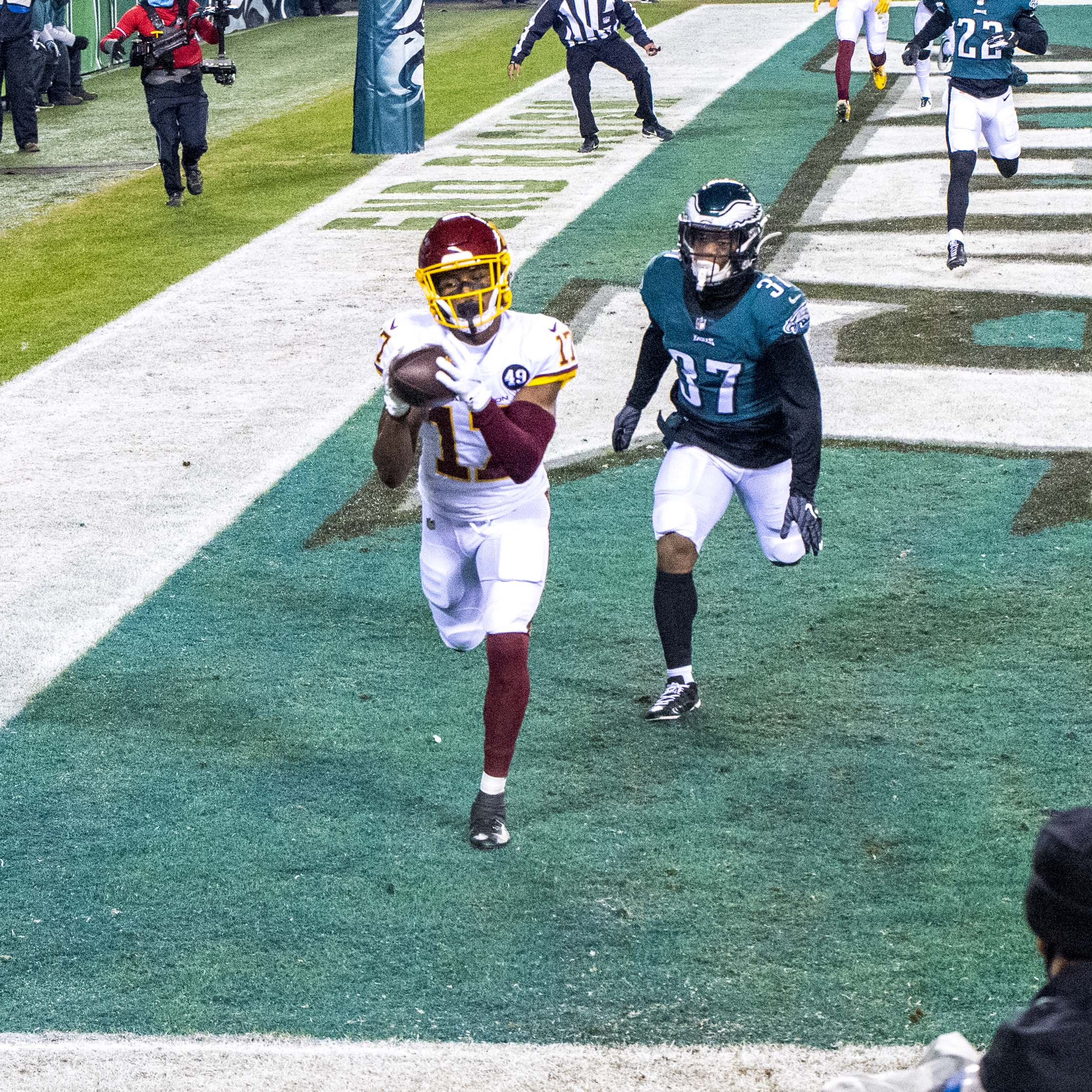
McLaurin catching a touchdown against the Philadelphia Eagles, 2020

In Week 2, McLaurin recorded seven receptions for 125 receiving yards and his first touchdown of the season during a loss to the Arizona Cardinals. In a Week 4 loss against the Baltimore Ravens, McLaurin recorded 10 receptions for 118 yards. Following a season ending injury to team captain Landon Collins in October 2020, McLaurin was unanimously voted by his teammates to replace him. In a Week 9 loss against the New York Giants, he had seven receptions for 115 receiving yards and a touchdown. He suffered a high ankle sprain against the Seattle Seahawks in Week 15 and missed the following game against the Carolina Panthers as a result. Despite the team's unstable quarterback situation, he would finish the season with 1,118 yards and four touchdowns. The team won the NFC East division, with McLaurin recording six catches for 75 yards in a 31–23 Wildcard loss to the Tampa Bay Buccaneers.

=== 2021 ===
In March 2021, Curtis Samuel signed a three-year contract with the Washington Football Team, reuniting McLaurin with his college roommate and fellow receiver. In a Week 2 game against the New York Giants on Thursday Night Football, McLaurin caught 11 receptions for 107 yards and a touchdown in a 30–29 victory. McLaurin recorded 123 yards off of six receptions and two touchdowns in the Week 4 win over the Atlanta Falcons. He recorded 103 yards off of three receptions and a touchdown in the 27–21 Week 11 win over the Carolina Panthers, this would be his fourth 100-plus yard game in the season. McLaurin left in the third quarter of the Week 14 game against the Dallas Cowboys due to a concussion. In the 2021 season, McLaurin started in all 17 games. He recorded 77 receptions for 1,053 receiving yards and five receiving touchdowns.

=== 2022 ===
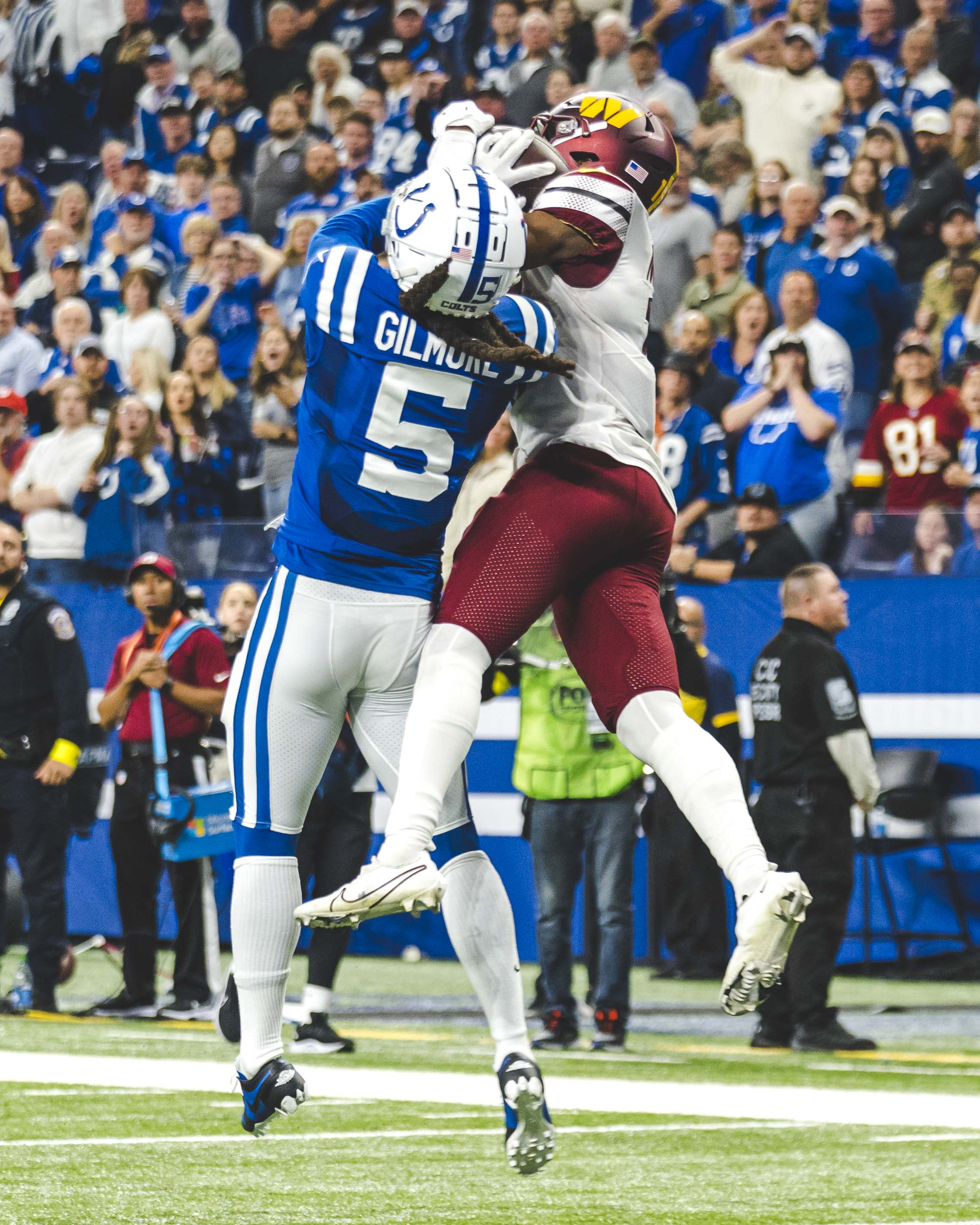
McLaurin catching a pass near the goal line against Indianapolis Colts player Stephon Gilmore, 2022

An impending free agent after the season, McLaurin decided against participating in on-field offseason workouts. On July 5, 2022, McLaurin signed a three-year contract extension worth $71 million with a $28 million signing bonus. In the 2022 season opening win over the Jacksonville Jaguars, he recorded 58 receiving yards off two receptions as well as a 49-yard touchdown reception. The Week 8 game against the Indianapolis Colts at Lucas Oil Stadium was the first time in McLaurin's professional career that he played in his hometown of Indianapolis. With the Commanders losing and 40 seconds remaining in the game, McLaurin made a critical 33-yard contested catch which set up the Commanders to score a one-yard rushing touchdown on the next play and winning the game with a final score of 17–16. He finished the game with 113 yards off six receptions against the Colts. McLaurin had eight receptions for a season-best 128 yards on Monday Night Football as the Commanders ended the Eagles' undefeated start to the season in Week 10. He finished the season with 77 receptions, a career-high 1,191 yards, and five touchdowns, and was also voted to his first Pro Bowl. He was ranked 94th by his fellow players on the NFL Top 100 Players of 2023.

=== 2023 ===
McLaurin achieved his career high single game receiving yards record in Week 15 against the Los Angeles Rams, during the game he hauled in 6 receptions for 141 yards and one touchdown. He finished the season with four touchdowns and 1,002 yards, making him the first Washington player to record four straight 1,000 yard seasons. He was ranked 97th by his fellow players on the NFL Top 100 Players of 2024.

=== 2024 ===
In a Week 3 Monday Night Football win against the Cincinnati Bengals, McLaurin caught a 27-yard touchdown late in the fourth quarter from rookie quarterback Jayden Daniels to essentially seal the victory. McLaurin finished the game with four catches for 100 yards and a touchdown. McLaurin caught a 10-yard touchdown pass in a Week 4 win over the Arizona Cardinals, marking his first time with touchdowns in consecutive games since 2020. In a Week 6 loss against the Baltimore Ravens, McLaurin caught 6 passes for 53 yards and two touchdowns, marking his first multiple touchdown game since 2021.

In a Week 9 win against the New York Giants, McLaurin caught two touchdowns for 19 yards. Against the Dallas Cowboys in Week 12, McLaurin caught a career long 86-yard touchdown pass. McLaurin would again record career highs in Week 13 against the Tennessee Titans, catching two touchdown passes, putting him at nine total on the season, which broke his previous season high of seven during his rookie year, and marked his third time with multiple scores this season. He caught two more touchdowns in a win the following week against the New Orleans Saints, scoring multiple touchdowns in consecutive games for the first time in his career. McLaurin finished the season second in the league with 13 touchdown receptions, setting a new Commanders record, and went over 1,000 receiving yards for the fifth consecutive year. He was named second-team All-Pro, the first of his career, and was also named to the Pro Bowl.

In his second playoff appearance, McLaurin recorded seven receptions for 89 receiving yards and one touchdown in the Wild Card round win over the Tampa Bay Buccaneers. He would follow-up with four receptions for 87 yards and a touchdown in the 45–31 win over the Detroit Lions that advanced Washington to the NFC Championship Game. In the 55–23 loss to the Eagles in the NFC Championship, he had a receiving touchdown. He was ranked 52nd by his fellow players on the NFL Top 100 Players of 2025.

=== 2025 ===
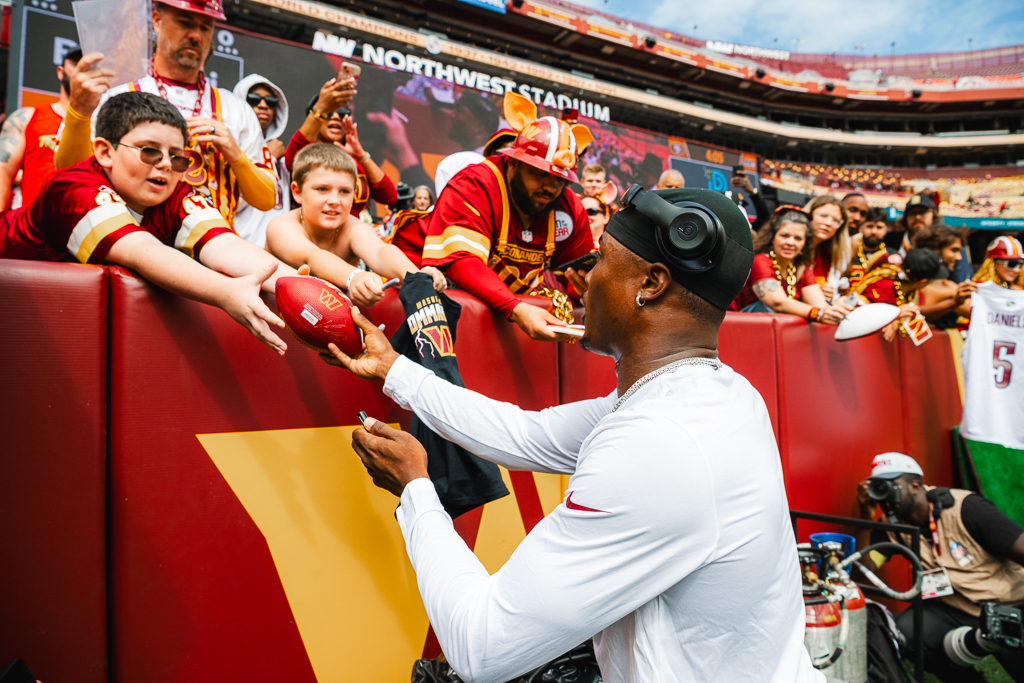
McLaurin signing autographs before a game, 2025

Amidst contract extension negotiations, McLaurin was placed on the did not report list after holding out the first four days of training camp before reporting on July 27, where he was placed on the active/physically unable to perform (PUP) list for an ankle injury. On July 30, he announced he was seeking a trade after several failed negotiations. McLaurin was activated off of the PUP list on August 16. On August 26, he signed a three-year contract extension worth $96 million with $44.65 million guaranteed. In the Week 3 win over the Las Vegas Raiders, McLaurin suffered a quad injury after recording a 56-yard reception in the third quarter. After missing the next four games, he returned for the Week 8 loss to the Kansas City Chiefs and recorded three receptions for 54 yards and scored the team's only touchdown. McLaurin would leave the game early in the fourth quarter after re-injuring the same quad with Head Coach Dan Quinn announcing McLaurin would miss additional time. In his return in Week 13 against the Denver Broncos, he recorded seven receptions for 96 yards and scored a lone touchdown in overtime giving the Commanders a chance to win. Ultimately, the team failed to execute a two-point conversion with the final score being 27–26.

=== 2026 ===
In the Week 6 game against the San Francisco 49ers, McLaurin was carted off the field after an air cast was placed on his left leg. On October 20, 2026, the team confirmed he would miss the rest of the 2026 season after suffering a torn patellar tendon and placing him on injured reserve eight days later.

== Career statistics ==
Legend
**Bold**	Career high

=== NFL ===
==== Regular season ====
NFL regular season statistics
Year	Team	Games		Receiving					Fumbles	
Year	Team	GP	GS	Rec	Yds	Avg	Lng	TD	Fum	Lost
2019	WAS	14	14	58	919	**15.8**	75	7	0	–
2020	WAS	15	15	**87**	1,118	12.9	68	4	**1**	**1**
2021	WAS	17	17	77	1,053	13.7	46	5	0	–
2022	WAS	17	17	77	**1,191**	15.5	52	5	**1**	0
2023	WAS	17	17	79	1,002	12.7	48	4	0	–
2024	WAS	17	17	83	1,096	13.4	**86**	**13**	**1**	**1**
2025	WAS	10	10	38	582	15.3	56	3	0	–
2026	WAS	5	5	15	230	15.3	30	1	0	–
Career		112	112	513	7,191	14.0	86	42	3	2

==== Postseason ====
NFL postseason statistics
Year	Team	Games		Receiving					Fumbles	
Year	Team	GP	GS	Rec	Yds	Avg	Lng	TD	Fum	Lost
2020	WAS	1	1	6	75	12.5	18	–	–	–
2024	WAS	3	3	**14**	**227**	**16.2**	**58**	**3**	–	–
Career		4	4	20	302	15.1	58	3	–	–

=== College ===
College statistics
Season	GP	Receiving			
Season	GP	Rec	Yds	Avg	TD
2014	Redshirt				
2015	6	0	0	0.0	0
2016	13	11	114	10.4	2
2017	13	29	436	15.0	6
2018	12	**35**	**701**	**20.0**	**11**
Career	44	75	1,251	16.7	19

== Personal life ==
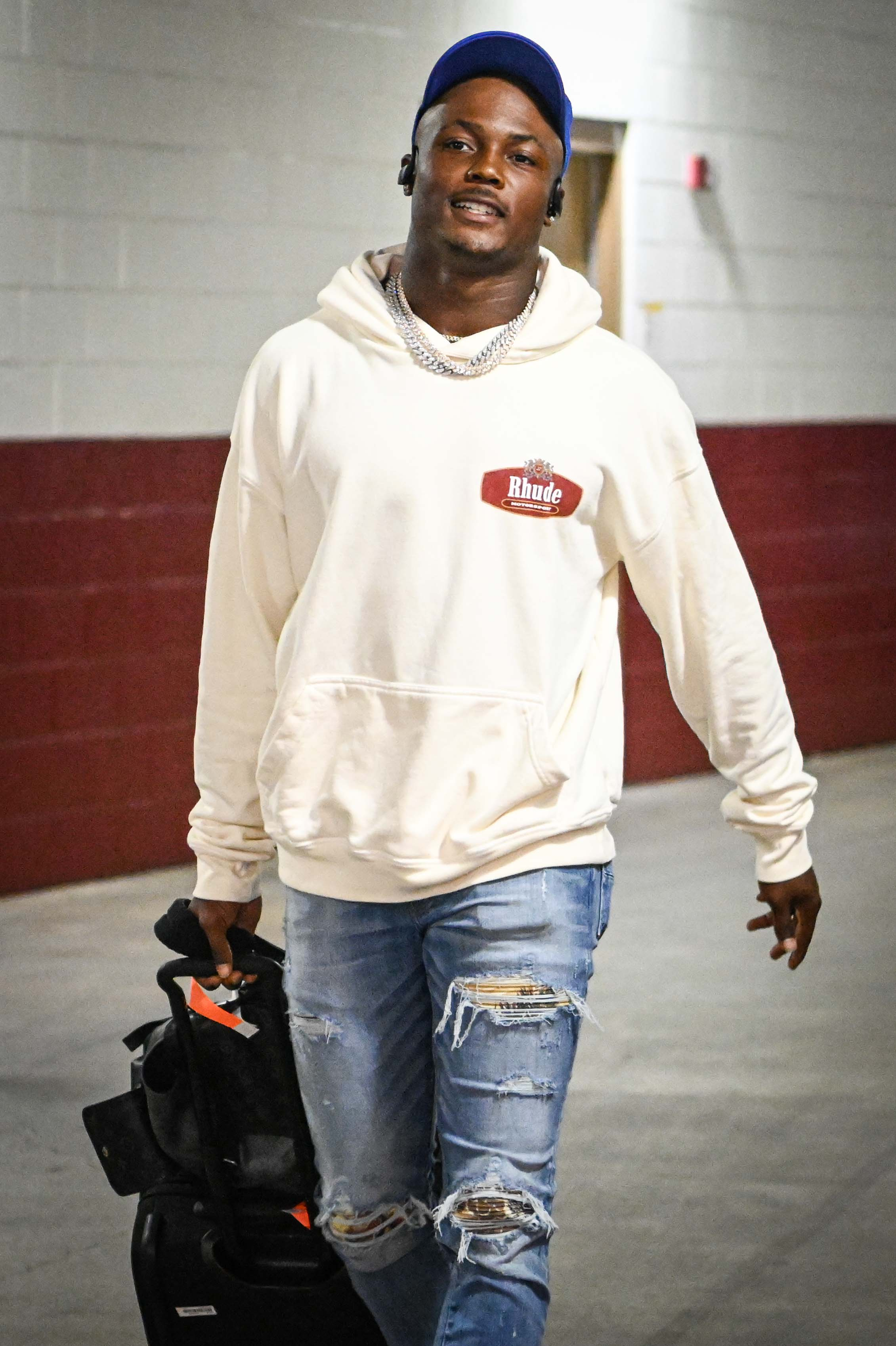
McLaurin arriving to a game, 2022

McLaurin has been called by several nicknames during his NFL career, such as "Scary Terry", "F1", and "The Captain". He established the Terry McLaurin Foundation to help disadvantaged kids in the Washington metropolitan area. He also has a cereal named after him called Terry McLaurin's Crunch Time.

McLaurin married Caitlin Winfrey in Los Cabos, Mexico, in February 2025.
