= Tim Settle =

American football player (born 1997)

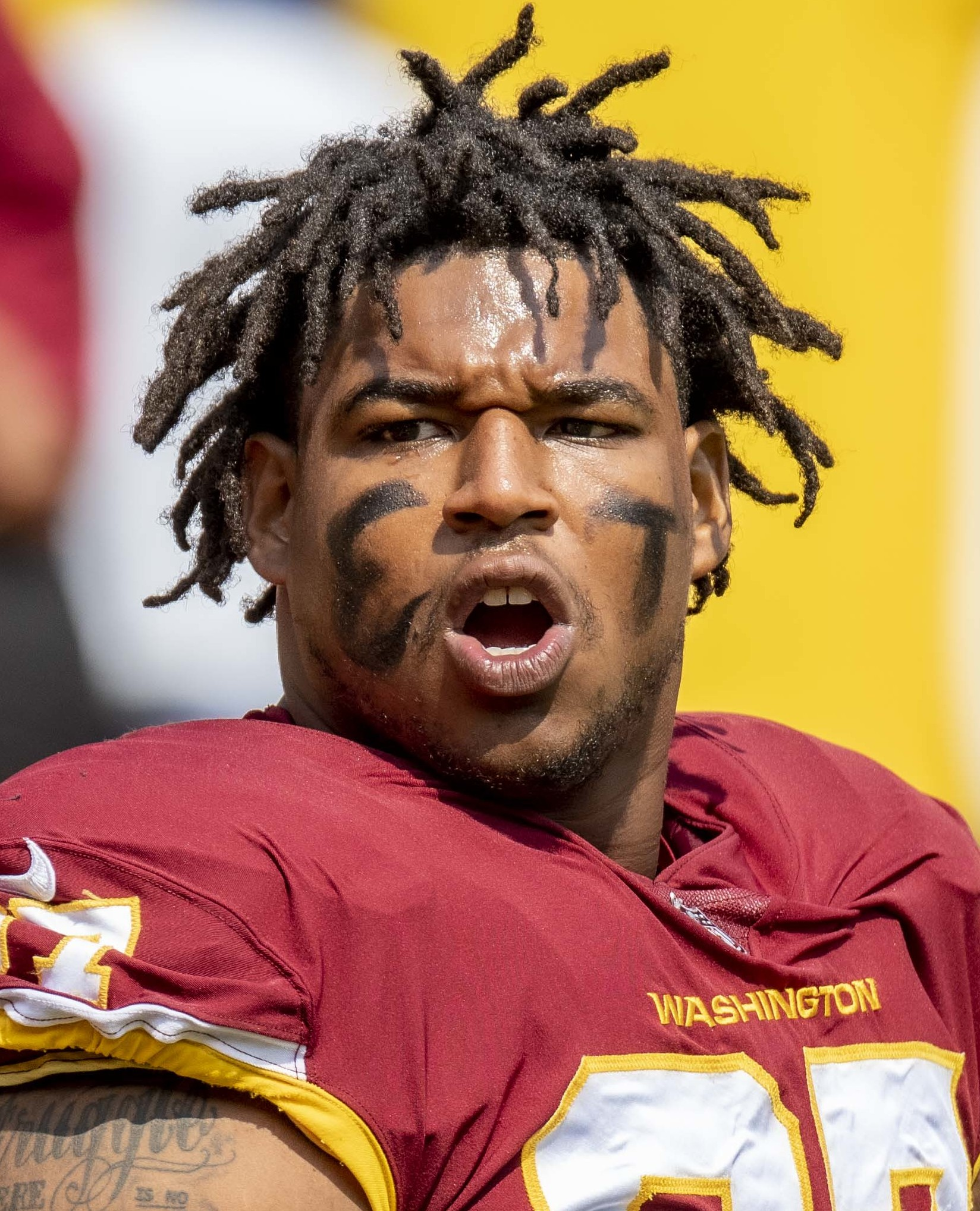
- Settle with the Washington Football Team in 2021

No. 97 – Washington Commanders
- Position: Nose tackle
- Roster status: Active

Personal information
- Born: July 11, 1997 (age 29); Philadelphia, Pennsylvania, U.S.
- Listed height: 6 ft 3 in (1.91 m)
- Listed weight: 315 lb (143 kg)

Career information
- High school: Stonewall Jackson (Manassas, Virginia)
- College: Virginia Tech (2015–2017)
- NFL draft: 2018: 5th round, 163rd overall pick

Career history
- Washington Redskins / Football Team (2018–2021); Buffalo Bills (2022–2023); Houston Texans (2024–2025); Washington Commanders (2026–present)

Awards and highlights
- Second-team All-ACC (2017); Second-team All-Freshman ACC (2016)

Career NFL statistics as of 2025
- Tackles: 133
- Sacks: 15
- Forced fumbles: 1
- Fumble recoveries: 3
- Pass deflections: 4
- Stats at Pro Football Reference

Tim Settle Jr. (born July 11, 1997) is an American professional football nose tackle for the Washington Commanders of the National Football League (NFL). Settle played college football for the Virginia Tech Hokies and was selected by the Washington Redskins in the fifth round of the 2018 NFL draft. He has also played for the Buffalo Bills and Houston Texans.

== Early life ==
Settle attended Stonewall Jackson High School in Manassas, Virginia. He played high school football for the Raiders. As a senior, he tallied 72 tackles, three sacks, two fumble recoveries and 10 pass deflections. A five-star recruit, Settle committed to play football for the Virginia Tech Hokies in January 2015, choosing them over programs such as Louisville and USC.

== College career ==
Settle attended and played college football at Virginia Tech under head coaches Frank Beamer and Justin Fuente. He did not play as a true freshman in 2015 and chose to redshirt.

As a redshirt freshman in 2016, Settle played in all 14 of Virginia Tech's games, recording 17 tackles (seven for loss), two quarterback hurries and one blocked kick. He was named to the Atlantic Coast Conference (ACC) All-Freshman Second-Team.

In 2017, as a redshirt sophomore, he played in 13 games, tallying 36 tackles (12.5 for loss), four sacks, one pass deflection, two quarterback hurries, and one blocked kick. Following the season, he was named to the 2017 All-ACC Second-Team. On January 4, 2018, Settle decided to forgo his remaining two years of eligibility and enter the 2018 NFL draft.

== Professional career ==
Pre-draft measurables
| Height | Weight | Arm length | Hand span | Wingspan | 40-yard dash | 10-yard split | 20-yard split | 20-yard shuttle | Three-cone drill | Vertical jump | Broad jump |
|---|---|---|---|---|---|---|---|---|---|---|---|
| 6 ft 2 3/4 in (1.90 m) | 329 lb (149 kg) | 33 in (0.84 m) | 9 1/8 in (0.23 m) | 6 ft 6 3/4 in (2.00 m) | 5.22 s | 1.81 s | 3.00 s | 4.83 s | 7.78 s | 25.5 in (0.65 m) | 8 ft 3 in (2.51 m) |
All values from NFL Combine/Pro Day

=== Washington Redskins / Football Team ===
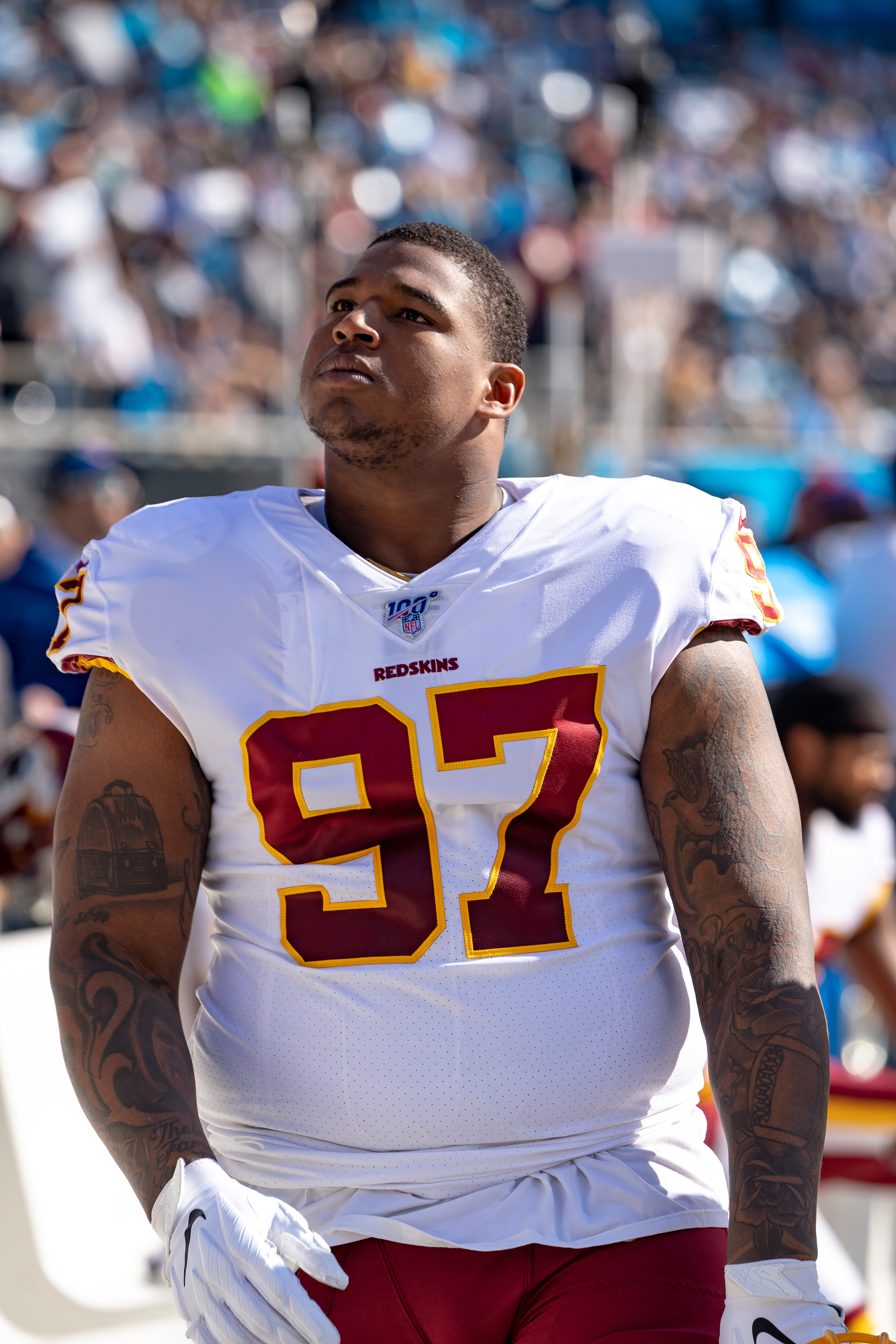
Settle with the Washington Redskins in 2019

Settle was selected by the Washington Redskins in the fifth round (163rd overall) of the 2018 NFL draft. He made his NFL debut in the Redskins' season-opening 24–6 victory over the Arizona Cardinals. In Week 12 against the Dallas Cowboys, he recorded the first three tackles of his professional career.

In 2019, Settle made his first NFL start in a Week 2 loss to the Cowboys. In Week 5, Settle recorded his first career NFL sack on New England Patriots' quarterback Tom Brady.

Settle finished the 2020 season with a new career high of five sacks, which ranked him fourth on the team.

On December 14, 2021, Settle was placed on the COVID-19 reserve list, but reactivated a week later.

=== Buffalo Bills ===
On March 17, 2022, Settle signed a two-year contract with the Buffalo Bills. In the 2022 season, he had one sack, 19 tackles, one pass defended, and one forced fumble. In the 2023 season, he had one sack and 14 tackles.

=== Houston Texans ===
On March 15, 2024, Settle signed a two-year contract with the Houston Texans. In 17 appearances (11 starts) for the Texans, he had five sacks and 31 tackles.

Settle entered the 2025 campaign as one of Houston's starting defensive tackles, recording three pass deflections, one sack, and 15 combined tackles across 12 games. On December 4, 2025, it was announced that Settle would require season-ending surgery to address a foot injury.

=== Washington Commanders ===
On March 12, 2026, Settle signed a three-year, $24 million contract with the Washington Commanders.

== Career statistics ==
=== NFL ===
Legend
| **Bold** | Career high |

==== Regular season ====
| Year | Team | Games | | Tackles | | | | | | | Interceptions | | | | | | Fumbles | | | | |
| Year | Team | GP | GS | Cmb | Solo | Ast | TFL | QBH | Sck | Sfty | PD | Int | Yds | Y/I | Lng | TD | FF | FR | Yds | Y/R | TD |
|---|---|---|---|---|---|---|---|---|---|---|---|---|---|---|---|---|---|---|---|---|---|
| 2018 | WAS | 16 | 0 | 8 | 6 | 2 | 1 | 0 | 0.0 | 0 | 0 | 0 | 0 | — | 0 | 0 | 0 | 0 | — | — | — |
| 2019 | WAS | 15 | 1 | 14 | 9 | 5 | 2 | 5 | 2.0 | 0 | 0 | 0 | 0 | — | 0 | 0 | 0 | 0 | — | — | — |
| 2020 | WAS | 16 | 1 | 19 | 12 | 7 | 5 | 7 | **5.0** | 0 | 0 | 0 | 0 | — | 0 | 0 | 0 | 0 | — | — | — |
| 2021 | WAS | 16 | 0 | 13 | 7 | 6 | 4 | 0 | 0.0 | 0 | 0 | 0 | 0 | — | 0 | 0 | 0 | **1** | -7 | -7.0 | 0 |
| 2022 | BUF | 15 | 2 | 19 | 11 | 8 | 4 | 2 | 1.0 | 0 | 1 | 0 | 0 | — | 0 | 0 | **1** | **1** | 0 | 0.0 | 0 |
| 2023 | BUF | **17** | 2 | 14 | 9 | 5 | 1 | 2 | 1.0 | 0 | 0 | 0 | 0 | — | 0 | 0 | 0 | 0 | — | — | — |
| 2024 | HOU | **17** | 11 | **31** | **24** | 7 | **10** | **10** | **5.0** | 0 | 0 | 0 | 0 | — | 0 | 0 | 0 | **1** | **2** | **2.0** | 0 |
| 2025 | HOU | 12 | **12** | 15 | 6 | **9** | 3 | 1 | 1.0 | 0 | **3** | 0 | 0 | — | 0 | 0 | 0 | 0 | — | — | — |
| Career | | 124 | 29 | 133 | 84 | 49 | 30 | 27 | 15.0 | 0 | 4 | 0 | 0 | — | 0 | 0 | 1 | 3 | -5 | -1.7 | 0 |

==== Postseason ====
| Year | Team | Games | | Tackles | | | | | | | Interceptions | | | | | | Fumbles | | | | |
| Year | Team | GP | GS | Cmb | Solo | Ast | TFL | QBH | Sck | Sfty | PD | Int | Yds | Y/I | Lng | TD | FF | FR | Yds | Y/R | TD |
|---|---|---|---|---|---|---|---|---|---|---|---|---|---|---|---|---|---|---|---|---|---|
| 2020 | WAS | 1 | 0 | 0 | 0 | 0 | 0 | 0 | 0.0 | 0 | 0 | 0 | 0 | — | 0 | 0 | 0 | 0 | — | — | — |
| 2022 | BUF | **2** | 1 | **2** | **1** | **1** | 0 | 0 | 0.0 | 0 | 0 | 0 | 0 | — | 0 | 0 | 0 | 0 | — | — | — |
| 2023 | BUF | **2** | 0 | 1 | **1** | 0 | 0 | 0 | 0.0 | 0 | 0 | 0 | 0 | — | 0 | 0 | 0 | 0 | — | — | — |
| 2024 | HOU | **2** | **2** | **2** | **1** | **1** | **1** | 0 | 0.0 | 0 | 0 | 0 | 0 | — | 0 | 0 | 0 | 0 | — | — | — |
| Career | | 7 | 3 | 5 | 3 | 2 | 1 | 0 | 0.0 | 0 | 0 | 0 | 0 | — | 0 | 0 | 0 | 0 | — | — | — |

=== College ===
| **Year** | **School** | **G** | **Solo** | **Ast** | **Tot** | **Loss** | **Sk** |
| 2016 | Virginia Tech | 11 | 7 | 10 | 17 | 7.0 | 0.0 |
| 2017 | Virginia Tech | 12 | 21 | 15 | 36 | 12.5 | 4.0 |
| **Career** | **Virginia Tech** | **23** | **28** | **25** | **53** | **19.5** | **4.0** |
