= 2019 Washington Redskins season =

88th season in franchise history; final one with the "Redskins" name

- Owner: Daniel Snyder
- President: Bruce Allen
- Head coach: Jay Gruden (fired on October 7, 0-5 record); Bill Callahan (interim, 3-8 record)
- Offensive coordinator: Kevin O'Connell
- Defensive coordinator: Greg Manusky
- Home stadium: FedExField

Results
- Record: 3–13
- Division place: 4th NFC East
- Playoffs: Did not qualify
- All-Pros: P Tress Way (2nd team)
- Pro Bowlers: G Brandon Scherff; P Tress Way

Uniform
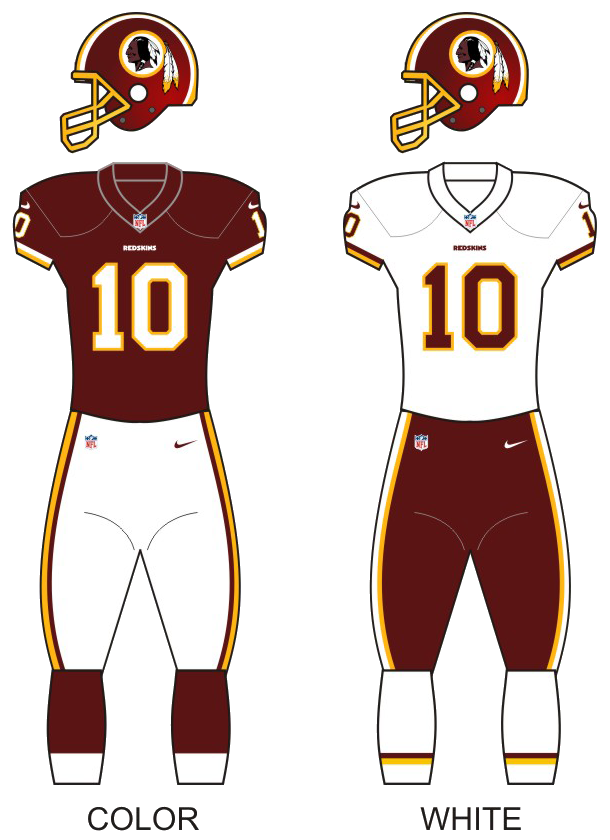

The 2019 season was the Washington Redskins' 88th in the National Football League (NFL) and their sixth and final under head coach Jay Gruden, as well as their final season being known as the Redskins. The team retired the name and logo following the season after years of controversy regarding it. After five straight losses to open the season, their worst since 2001, the team fired Gruden and appointed offensive line coach Bill Callahan as interim head coach. The team finished 3–13, matching their worst 16-game record from the 1994 and 2013 seasons, which was the league's second-worst record that year, ahead of only the 2–14 Cincinnati Bengals.

The team's 3–13 record dropped the team to a combined record of 4–19 following Alex Smith's season-ending injury against the Houston Texans the previous season; Washington had entered that game at 6–3. Smith returned to the active roster in 2020. Following the season's end, team president Bruce Allen and several others within the team's front office were fired.

== NFL draft ==
2019 Washington Redskins draft
Round	Pick	Player	Position	College	Notes
1	15	Dwayne Haskins	QB	Ohio State	
1	26	Montez Sweat *	OLB	Mississippi State	
3	76	Terry McLaurin *	WR	Ohio State	
4	112	Bryce Love	RB	Stanford	
4	131	Wes Martin	G	Indiana	
5	153	Ross Pierschbacher	C	Alabama	
5	173	Cole Holcomb	LB	North Carolina	
6	206	Kelvin Harmon	WR	NC State	
7	227	Jimmy Moreland	CB	James Madison	
7	253	Jordan Brailford	OLB	Oklahoma State	
Made roster † Pro Football Hall of Fame * Made at least one Pro Bowl during career

Notes

- Washington traded their fourth-round selection to the Green Bay Packers in exchange for safety Ha Ha Clinton Dix, and forfeited their sixth-round selection after selecting cornerback Adonis Alexander in the 2018 supplemental draft.
- As the result of a negative differential of free agent signings and departures that Washington experienced during the 2018 free agency period, the team was projected to receive three compensatory selections for the 2019 draft. Exact numbers of the selections from rounds 4–7 is to be determined when compensatory selections are awarded at the NFL's annual spring owners' meetings.
- Washington was awarded four compensatory picks including their second selections in rounds 3, 5 and 7 and their sole pick in round 6.
- Washington traded their second-round selection to the Indianapolis Colts in exchange for the 26th overall selection in the 2019 NFL draft and a second round selection in the 2020 NFL draft.
- Washington traded their third-round compensatory selection (pick 96) to the Buffalo Bills in exchange for picks 112 and 131 in the 2019 NFL draft.

== Staff ==
2019 Washington Redskins staff
Front office: Owner – Daniel Snyder; President – Bruce Allen; Senior vice president of player personnel – Doug Williams; Senior vice president of football operations – Eric Schaffer; Director of pro personnel – Alex Santos; Director of college scouting – Kyle Smith; Head coaches: Head coach – Jay Gruden; Interim head coach/assistant head coach/offensive line – Bill Callahan; Offensive coaches: Offensive coordinator – Kevin O'Connell; Quarterbacks – Tim Rattay; Running backs – Randy Jordan; Wide receivers – Ike Hilliard; Tight ends – Brian Angelichio; Assistant offensive line – Phil Rauscher; Senior offensive assistant – Matt Cavanaugh; Offensive assistant – Aaron Stamn; Offensive quality control – Chris O'Hara	Defensive coaches: Defensive coordinator – Greg Manusky; Defensive line – Jim Tomsula; Outside linebackers – Chad Grimm; Inside linebackers – Rob Ryan; Defensive backs – Ray Horton; Assistant defensive backs – James Rowe; Defensive quality control – Kyshoen Jarrett; Defensive quality control – Cannon Matthews; Special teams coaches: Special teams coordinator – Nate Kaczor; Assistant special teams – Bret Munsey; Strength and conditioning: Head strength and conditioning – Chad Englehart; Assistant strength and conditioning – Kavan Latham; Assistant strength and conditioning – Jake Sankal; Director of play development – Malcolm Blacken; Assistant to the director of player development – Evan Harrington

== Final roster ==
2019 Washington Redskins roster
Quarterbacks (QB): 7 Dwayne Haskins; 8 Case Keenum; 12 Colt McCoy; Running backs (RB): 45 Michael Burton; 36 Josh Ferguson; 26 Adrian Peterson; 34 Wendell Smallwood; 25 Chris Thompson; Wide receivers (WR): 13 Kelvin Harmon; 84 Darvin Kidsy; 17 Terry McLaurin; 89 Cam Sims; 15 Steven Sims; 19 Jester Weah; Tight ends (TE): 88 Hale Hentges; 87 Jeremy Sprinkle; 83 Caleb Wilson	Offensive linemen (OL): 66 Tony Bergstrom C; 74 Geron Christian T; 77 Ereck Flowers G; 67 Wes Martin G; 76 Morgan Moses T; 61 Timon Parris T; 72 Donald Penn T; 64 Ross Pierschbacher C; 73 Chase Roullier C; Defensive linemen (DL): 93 Jonathan Allen DE; 96 Treyvon Hester DE; 98 Matt Ioannidis DE; 94 Daron Payne NT; 97 Tim Settle NT	Linebackers (LB): 52 Ryan Anderson OLB; 53 Jon Bostic ILB; 51 Shaun Dion Hamilton ILB; 40 Josh Harvey-Clemons ILB; 55 Cole Holcomb ILB; 50 Chris Odom OLB; 54 Nate Orchard OLB; 90 Montez Sweat OLB; Defensive backs (DB): 30 Troy Apke FS; 48 Breon Borders CB; 20 Landon Collins SS; 47 Aaron Colvin CB; 41 Dee Delaney CB; 32 Kenny Ladler FS; 24 Josh Norman CB; 39 Jeremy Reaves SS; 37 Coty Sensabaugh CB; 46 Maurice Smith SS; 38 Kayvon Webster CB; Special teams (ST): 3 Dustin Hopkins K; 57 Nick Sundberg LS; 5 Tress Way P	Practice squad: 79 Paul Adams T; 92 Ryan Bee DE; 16 Jehu Chesson WR (PS/I); 48 Derrick Gore RB; 80 Emanuel Hall WR; 48 Cameron Malveaux DE; 58 Cassanova McKinzy OLB (PS/I); 58 Pete Robertson LB; 82 Keith Towbridge TE; 14 Jordan Veasy WR; 95 JoJo Wicker DE; Reserve: 95 Jordan Brailford OLB (IR); 99 Caleb Brantley DE (IR); 83 Jerome Cunningham TE (IR); 85 Vernon Davis TE (IR); 23 Quinton Dunbar CB (IR); 22 Deshazor Everett SS (IR); 56 Reuben Foster ILB (IR); 29 Derrius Guice RB (IR); 41 Danny Johnson CB (IR); 91 Ryan Kerrigan OLB (IR); 23 Bryce Love RB (NF-Inj.); 31 Fabian Moreau CB (IR); 32 Jimmy Moreland CB (IR); 35 Montae Nicholson FS (IR); 18 Trey Quinn WR (IR); 86 Jordan Reed TE (IR); 10 Paul Richardson WR (IR); 45 Dominique Rodgers-Cromartie CB (IR); 75 Brandon Scherff G (IR); 37 Greg Stroman CB (IR); 11 Alex Smith QB (PUP); 38 Simeon Thomas CB (Susp.); 6 Josh Woodrum QB (IR); 71 Trent Williams T (NF-Inj.); Rookies in italics 53 active, 26 reserve, 9 practice squad

== Preseason ==
Week	Date	Opponent	Result	Record	Venue	Recap
1	August 8	at Cleveland Browns	L 10–30	0–1	FirstEnergy Stadium	Recap
2	August 15	Cincinnati Bengals	L 13–23	0–2	FedExField	Recap
3	August 22	at Atlanta Falcons	W 19–7	1–2	Mercedes-Benz Stadium	Recap
4	August 29	Baltimore Ravens	L 7–20	1–3	FedExField	Recap

== Regular season ==
=== Schedule ===
Week	Date	Opponent	Result	Record	Venue	Recap
1	September 8	at **Philadelphia Eagles**	**L** 27–32	0–1	Lincoln Financial Field	Recap
2	September 15	**Dallas Cowboys**	**L** 21–31	0–2	FedExField	Recap
3	September 23	Chicago Bears	**L** 15–31	0–3	FedExField	Recap
4	September 29	at **New York Giants**	**L** 3–24	0–4	MetLife Stadium	Recap
5	October 6	New England Patriots	**L** 7–33	0–5	FedExField	Recap
6	October 13	at Miami Dolphins	**W** 17–16	1–5	Hard Rock Stadium	Recap
7	October 20	San Francisco 49ers	**L** 0–9	1–6	FedExField	Recap
8	October 24	at Minnesota Vikings	**L** 9–19	1–7	U.S. Bank Stadium	Recap
9	November 3	at Buffalo Bills	**L** 9–24	1–8	New Era Field	Recap
10	Bye					
11	November 17	New York Jets	**L** 17–34	1–9	FedExField	Recap
12	November 24	Detroit Lions	**W** 19–16	2–9	FedExField	Recap
13	December 1	at Carolina Panthers	**W** 29–21	3–9	Bank of America Stadium	Recap
14	December 8	at Green Bay Packers	**L** 15–20	3–10	Lambeau Field	Recap
15	December 15	**Philadelphia Eagles**	**L** 27–37	3–11	FedExField	Recap
16	December 22	**New York Giants**	**L** 35–41 (OT)	3–12	FedExField	Recap
17	December 29	at **Dallas Cowboys**	**L** 16–47	3–13	AT&T Stadium	Recap

Note: Intra-division opponents are in bold text.

=== Game summaries ===
==== Week 1: at Philadelphia Eagles ====
Week One: Washington Redskins at Philadelphia Eagles – Game summary

Quarter	1	2	3	4	Total
Redskins	10	10	0	7	**27**
**Eagles**	0	7	14	11	**32**

at Lincoln Financial Field, Philadelphia, Pennsylvania

- Date: September 8
- Game time: 1:00 p.m. EDT
- Game weather: Sunny, 79 °F (26 °C)
- Game attendance: 69,696
- Referee: Ronald Torbert
- TV announcers (Fox): Kevin Burkhardt, Charles Davis and Pam Oliver
- Recap, Game Book

Game information

**First quarter**

- WAS – Vernon Davis 48-yard pass from Case Keenum (Dustin Hopkins kick), 10:54. Redskins 7–0. **Drive: 7 plays, 80 yards, 4:06.**
- WAS – Dustin Hopkins 41-yard field goal, 2:48. Redskins 10–0. **Drive: 11 plays, 57 yards, 5:55.**

**Second quarter**

- WAS – Terry McLaurin 69-yard pass from Case Keenum (Dustin Hopkins kick), 9:57. Redskins 17–0. **Drive: 2 plays, 71 yards, 0:52**
- PHI – DeSean Jackson 51-yard pass from Carson Wentz (Jake Elliott kick), 4:19. Redskins 17–7. **Drive: 5 plays, 62 yards, 1:28**
- WAS – Dustin Hopkins 48-yard field goal, 0:00. Redskins 20–7. **Drive: 9 plays, 41 yards, 1:41.**

**Third quarter**

- PHI – Alshon Jeffery 5-yard pass from Carson Wentz (Jake Elliott kick), 7:50. Redskins 20–14. **Drive: 12 plays, 75 yards, 7:10**
- PHI – DeSean Jackson 53-yard pass from Carson Wentz (Jake Elliott kick), 5:07. Eagles 21–20. **Drive: 3 plays, 53 yards, 0:15**

**Fourth quarter**

- PHI – Alshon Jeffery 2-yard rush (Darren Sproles rush), 14:55. Eagles 29–20. **Drive: 9 plays, 71 yards, 4:42**
- PHI – Jake Elliott 22-yard field goal, 3:10. Eagles 32–20. **Drive: 19 plays, 74 yards, 8:55**
- WAS – Trey Quinn 4-yard pass from Case Keenum, 0:06. Eagles 32–27. **Drive: 15 plays, 75 yards, 3:04**

**Top passers**

- WAS – Case Keenum – 30/44, 380 yards, 3 TD
- PHI – Carson Wentz – 28/39, 313 yards, 3 TD

**Top rushers**

- WAS – Derrius Guice – 10 rushes, 18 yards
- PHI – Darren Sproles – 9 rushes, 47 yards

**Top receivers**

- WAS – Terry McLaurin – 5 receptions, 125 yards, TD
- PHI – DeSean Jackson – 8 receptions, 154 yards, 2 TD

==== Week 2: vs. Dallas Cowboys ====
Week Two: Dallas Cowboys at Washington Redskins – Game summary

Quarter	1	2	3	4	Total
**Cowboys**	0	14	7	10	**31**
Redskins	0	7	7	7	**21**

at FedEx Field, Landover, Maryland

- Date: September 15
- Game time: 1:00 p.m. EDT
- Game weather: Sunny, 80 °F (27 °C)
- Game attendance: 75,128
- Referee: Shawn Hochuli
- TV announcers (Fox): Kevin Burkhardt, Charles Davis and Pam Oliver
- Recap, Game Book

Game information

**First quarter**

- No scoring plays.

**Second quarter**

- WAS – Adrian Peterson 1-yard run (Dustin Hopkins kick), 14:15. Redskins 7–0. **Drive: 10 plays, 38 yards, 5:53.**
- DAL – Devin Smith 51-yard pass from Dak Prescott (Brett Maher kick), 6:10. Tied 7–7. **Drive: 7 plays, 97 yards, 3:34.**
- DAL – Jason Witten 2-yard pass from Dak Prescott (Brett Maher kick), 0:09. Cowboys 14–7. **Drive: 11 plays, 83 yards, 4:23.**

**Third quarter**

- DAL – Amari Cooper 10-yard pass from Dak Prescott (Brett Maher kick), 9:58. Cowboys 21–7. **Drive: 9 plays, 75 yards, 5:02.**
- WAS – Paul Richardson 9-yard pass from Case Keenum (Dustin Hopkins kick), 4:30. Cowboys 21–14. **Drive: 11 plays, 75 yards, 5:28.**

**Fourth quarter**

- DAL – Brett Maher 25-yard field goal, 13:51. Cowboys 24–14. **Drive: 11 plays, 68 yards, 5:39.**
- DAL – Ezekiel Elliott 2-yard run (Brett Maher kick), 5:07. Cowboys 31–14. **Drive: 10 plays, 54 yards, 5:57.**
- WAS – Terry McLaurin 1-yard pass from Case Keenum (Dustin Hopkins kick), 2:17. Cowboys 31–21. **Drive: 11 plays, 75 yards, 2:50.**

**Top passers**

- DAL – Dak Prescott – 26/30, 269 yards, 3 TD, INT
- WAS – Case Keenum – 26/37, 221 yards, 2 TD

**Top rushers**

- DAL – Ezekiel Elliott – 23 rushes, 111 yards, TD
- WAS – Adrian Peterson – 10 rushes, 25 yards, TD

**Top receivers**

- DAL – Devin Smith – 3 receptions, 74 yards, TD
- WAS – Terry McLaurin – 5 receptions, 62 yards, TD

==== Week 3: vs. Chicago Bears ====
Week Three: Chicago Bears at Washington Redskins – Game summary

Quarter	1	2	3	4	Total
**Bears**	7	21	0	3	**31**
Redskins	0	3	6	6	**15**

at FedEx Field, Landover, Maryland

- Date: September 23
- Game time: 8:15 p.m. EDT
- Game weather: Cloudy, 87 °F (31 °C)
- Game attendance: 67,327
- Referee: Walt Anderson
- TV announcers (ESPN): Joe Tessitore, Booger McFarland and Lisa Salters
- Recap, Game Book

Game information

**First quarter**

- CHI – Ha Ha Clinton-Dix 37-yard interception return (Eddy Piñeiro kick), 9:42. Bears 7–0.

**Second quarter**

- CHI – Taylor Gabriel 3-yard pass from Mitchell Trubisky (Eddy Piñeiro kick), 7:00. Bears 14–0. **Drive: 11 plays, 67 yards, 6:23.**
- CHI – Taylor Gabriel 1-yard pass from Mitchell Trubisky (Eddy Piñeiro kick), 5:42. Bears 21–0. **Drive: 2 plays, 11 yards, 0:46.**
- CHI – Taylor Gabriel 36-yard pass from Mitchell Trubisky (Eddy Piñeiro kick), 0:43. Bears 28–0. **Drive: 9 plays, 63 yards, 4:23.**
- WAS – Dustin Hopkins 35-yard field goal, 0:00. Bears 28–3. **Drive: 5 plays, 56 yards, 0:43.**

**Third quarter**

- WAS – Terry McLaurin 15-yard pass from Case Keenum (pass failed), 6:39. Bears 28–9. **Drive: 8 plays, 66 yards, 3:37.**

**Fourth quarter**

- WAS – Paul Richardson 2-yard pass from Case Keenum (pass failed), 13:11. Bears 28–15. **Drive: 12 plays, 97 yards, 4:56.**
- CHI – Eddy Piñeiro 38-yard field goal, 1:50. Bears 31–15. **Drive: 10 plays, 58 yards, 5:12.**

**Top passers**

- CHI – Mitchell Trubisky – 25/31, 231 yards, 3 TD, INT
- WAS – Case Keenum – 30/43, 332 yards, 2 TD, 3 INT

**Top rushers**

- CHI – David Montgomery – 13 rushes, 67 yards
- WAS – Adrian Peterson – 12 rushes, 37 yards

**Top receivers**

- CHI – Taylor Gabriel – 6 receptions, 75 yards, 3 TD
- WAS – Paul Richardson – 8 receptions, 83 yards, TD

The loss ended Washington's seven game win streak over the Bears.

==== Week 4: at New York Giants ====
Week Four: Washington Redskins at New York Giants – Game summary

Quarter	1	2	3	4	Total
Redskins	0	3	0	0	**3**
**Giants**	7	10	7	0	**24**

at MetLife Stadium, East Rutherford, New Jersey

- Date: September 29
- Game time: 1:00 p.m. EDT
- Game weather: Fair, 77 °F (25 °C)
- Game attendance: 74,149
- Referee: Alex Kemp
- TV announcers (Fox): Thom Brennaman, Chris Spielman and Shannon Spake
- Recap, Game Book

Game information

**First quarter**

- NYG – Wayne Gallman 6-yard pass from Daniel Jones (Aldrick Rosas kick), 8:45. Giants 7–0. **Drive: 8 plays, 32 yards, 5:15.**

**Second quarter**

- NYG – Wayne Gallman 1-yard run (Aldrick Rosas kick), 12:01. Giants 14–0. **Drive: 13 plays, 94 yards, 6:59.**
- WAS – Dustin Hopkins 21-yard field goal, 2:14. Giants 14–3. **Drive: 11 plays, 34 yards, 4:21.**
- NYG – Aldrick Rosas 30-yard field goal, 0:00. Giants 17–3. **Drive: 10 plays, 63 yards, 2:14.**

**Third quarter**

- NYG – Jabrill Peppers 32-yard interception return (Aldrick Rosas kick), 1:19. Giants 24–3.

**Fourth quarter**

- No scoring plays.

**Top passers**

- WAS – Dwayne Haskins – 9/17, 107 yards, 3 INT
- NYG – Daniel Jones – 23/31, 225 yards, TD, 2 INT

**Top rushers**

- WAS – Adrian Peterson – 11 rushes, 28 yards
- NYG – Wayne Gallman – 18 rushes, 63 yards, TD

**Top receivers**

- WAS – Chris Thompson – 4 receptions, 56 yards
- NYG – Sterling Shepard – 7 receptions, 76 yards

==== Week 5: vs. New England Patriots ====
Week Five: New England Patriots at Washington Redskins – Game summary

Quarter	1	2	3	4	Total
**Patriots**	6	6	14	7	**33**
Redskins	7	0	0	0	**7**

at FedEx Field, Landover, Maryland

- Date: October 6
- Game time: 1:00 p.m. EDT
- Game weather: Cloudy, 70 °F (21 °C)
- Game attendance: 76,483
- Referee: Clay Martin
- TV announcers (CBS): Greg Gumbel, Trent Green and Melanie Collins
- Recap, Game Book

Game information

**First quarter**

- WAS – Steven Sims 65-yard run (Dustin Hopkins kick), 9:26. Redskins 7–0. **Drive: 2 plays, 67 yards, 0:52.**
- NE – Julian Edelman 6-yard pass from Tom Brady (kick failed, wide right), 7:09. Redskins 7–6. **Drive: 6 plays, 75 yards, 2:17.**

**Second quarter**

- NE – Mike Nugent 37-yard field goal, 10:35. Patriots 9–7. **Drive: 8 plays, 61 yards, 2:55.**
- NE – Mike Nugent 23-yard field goal, 0:30. Patriots 12–7. **Drive: 4 plays, 6 yards, 0:21.**

**Third quarter**

- NE – Brandon Bolden 29-yard pass from Tom Brady (Mike Nugent kick), 10:57. Patriots 19–7. **Drive: 7 plays, 75 yards, 4:03.**
- NE – Sony Michel 14-yard run (Mike Nugent kick), 4:35. Patriots 26–7. **Drive: 6 plays, 88 yards, 3:05.**

**Fourth quarter**

- NE – Ryan Izzo 10-yard pass from Tom Brady (Mike Nugent kick), 9:14. Patriots 33–7. **Drive: 10 plays, 58 yards, 4:08.**

**Top passers**

- NE – Tom Brady – 28/42, 348 yards, 3 TD, INT
- WAS – Colt McCoy – 18/27, 122 yards, INT

**Top rushers**

- NE – Sony Michel – 16 rushes, 91 yards, TD
- WAS – Steven Sims – 1 rush, 65 yards, TD

**Top receivers**

- NE – Julian Edelman – 8 receptions, 110 yards, TD
- WAS – Terry McLaurin – 3 receptions, 51 yards

With their 4th straight loss to New England, the Redskins fell to 0–5 for the first time since 2001. As a result, head coach Jay Gruden was fired after the game.

The next day, president Bruce Allen attempted to defend his tenure with the Redskins by saying "the culture is actually damn good".

==== Week 6: at Miami Dolphins ====
Week Six: Washington Redskins at Miami Dolphins – Game summary

Quarter	1	2	3	4	Total
**Redskins**	0	7	10	0	**17**
Dolphins	0	3	0	13	**16**

at Hard Rock Stadium, Miami Gardens, Florida

- Date: October 13
- Game time: 1:00 p.m. EDT
- Game weather: Cloudy, 84 °F (29 °C)
- Game attendance: 59,808
- Referee: Shawn Smith
- TV announcers (Fox): Sam Rosen, Ronde Barber and Lindsay Czarniak
- Recap, Game Book

Game information

**First quarter**

- No scoring plays.

**Second quarter**

- WAS – Terry McLaurin 25-yard pass from Case Keenum (Dustin Hopkins kick), 11:34. Redskins 7–0. **Drive: 8 plays, 93 yards, 3:40.**
- MIA – Jason Sanders 39-yard field goal, 1:07. Redskins 7–3. **Drive: 10 plays, 63 yards, 5:06.**

**Third quarter**

- WAS – Terry McLaurin 33-yard pass from Case Keenum (Dustin Hopkins kick), 9:42. Redskins 14–3. **Drive: 6 plays, 70 yards, 3:32.**
- WAS – Dustin Hopkins 21-yard field goal, 4:15. Redskins 17–3. **Drive: 8 plays, 31 yards, 4:02.**

**Fourth quarter**

- MIA – Kalen Ballage 1-yard run (Jason Sanders kick), 10:56. Redskins 17–10. **Drive: 9 plays, 55 yards, 3:59.**
- MIA – DeVante Parker 11-yard pass from Ryan Fitzpatrick (pass failed), 0:06. Redskins 17–16. **Drive: 9 plays, 75 yards, 1:56.**

**Top passers**

- WAS – Case Keenum – 13/25, 166 yards, 2 TD
- MIA – Ryan Fitzpatrick – 12/18, 132 yards, TD

**Top rushers**

- WAS – Adrian Peterson – 23 rushes, 118 yards
- MIA – Kenyan Drake – 10 rushes, 40 yards

**Top receivers**

- WAS – Terry McLaurin – 4 receptions, 100 yards, 2 TD
- MIA – Mike Gesicki – 3 receptions, 51 yards

With the win, the Redskins got their first win of the season, and recorded their first ever road win in Miami against the Dolphins. This game was also known by many fans as the "Super Tank Bowl", as both teams entered winless. This was the final win against an AFC opponent as the "Redskins", as the branding was terminated the next summer.

==== Week 7: vs. San Francisco 49ers ====
Week Seven: San Francisco 49ers at Washington Redskins – Game summary

Quarter	1	2	3	4	Total
**49ers**	0	0	3	6	**9**
Redskins	0	0	0	0	**0**

at FedEx Field, Landover, Maryland

- Date: October 20
- Game time: 1:00 p.m. EDT
- Game weather: Rain, 55 °F (13 °C)
- Game attendance: 61,459
- Referee: Clete Blakeman
- TV announcers (Fox): Chris Myers, Daryl Johnston and Laura Okmin
- Recap, Game Book

Game information

**First quarter**

- No scoring plays.

**Second quarter**

- No scoring plays.

**Third quarter**

- SF – Robbie Gould 28-yard field goal, 5:28. 49ers 3–0. **Drive: 8 plays, 67 yards, 4:37.**

**Fourth quarter**

- SF – Robbie Gould 22-yard field goal, 9:03. 49ers 6–0. **Drive: 12 plays, 55 yards, 7:17.**
- SF – Robbie Gould 29-yard field goal, 0:23. 49ers 9–0. **Drive: 11 plays, 56 yards, 6:19.**

**Top passers**

- SF – Jimmy Garoppolo – 12/21, 151 yards, INT
- WAS – Case Keenum – 9/12, 77 yards

**Top rushers**

- SF – Tevin Coleman – 20 rushes, 62 yards
- WAS – Adrian Peterson – 20 rushes, 81 yards

**Top receivers**

- SF – Kendrick Bourne – 3 receptions, 69 yards
- WAS – Trey Quinn – 2 receptions, 30 yards

This marked Washington's last shutout loss until 2025.

==== Week 8: at Minnesota Vikings ====
Week Eight: Washington Redskins at Minnesota Vikings – Game summary

Quarter	1	2	3	4	Total
Redskins	0	6	3	0	**9**
**Vikings**	3	10	3	3	**19**

at U.S. Bank Stadium, Minneapolis, Minnesota

- Date: October 24
- Game time: 8:20 p.m. EDT/7:20 p.m. CDT
- Game weather: None (indoor stadium)
- Game attendance: 66,776
- Referee: Carl Cheffers
- TV announcers (Fox/NFLN/Amazon Prime): Joe Buck, Troy Aikman, Erin Andrews and Kristina Pink
- Recap, Game Book

Game information

**First quarter**

- MIN – Dan Bailey 50-yard field goal, 5:20. Vikings 3–0. **Drive: 8 plays, 14 yards, 3:37.**

**Second quarter**

- WAS – Dustin Hopkins 21-yard field goal, 14:00. Tied 3–3. **Drive: 13 plays, 72 yards, 6:20.**
- MIN – Dan Bailey 29-yard field goal, 7:26. Vikings 6–3. **Drive: 10 plays, 64 yards, 6:34.**
- WAS – Dustin Hopkins 30-yard field goal, 1:57. Tied 6–6. **Drive: 11 plays, 63 yards, 5:29.**
- MIN – Dalvin Cook 4-yard run (Dan Bailey kick), 0:07. Vikings 13–6. **Drive: 7 plays, 75 yards, 1:50.**

**Third quarter**

- MIN – Dan Bailey 27-yard field goal, 8:33. Vikings 16–6. **Drive: 10 plays, 82 yards, 4:50.**
- WAS – Dustin Hopkins 43-yard field goal, 5:11. Vikings 16–9. **Drive: 6 plays, 50 yards, 3:22.**

**Fourth quarter**

- MIN – Dan Bailey 40-yard field goal, 10:36. Vikings 19–9. **Drive: 12 plays, 59 yards, 6:23.**

**Top passers**

- WAS – Case Keenum – 12/16, 130 yards
- MIN – Kirk Cousins – 23/26, 285 yards

**Top rushers**

- WAS – Adrian Peterson – 14 rushes, 76 yards
- MIN – Dalvin Cook – 23 rushes, 98 yards, TD

**Top receivers**

- WAS – Terry McLaurin – 4 receptions, 39 yards
- MIN – Stefon Diggs – 7 receptions, 143 yards

==== Week 9: at Buffalo Bills ====
Week Nine: Washington Redskins at Buffalo Bills – Game summary

Quarter	1	2	3	4	Total
Redskins	0	6	3	0	**9**
**Bills**	10	7	0	7	**24**

at New Era Field, Orchard Park, New York

- Date: November 3
- Game time: 1:00 p.m. EST
- Game weather: Mostly cloudy, 42 °F (6 °C)
- Game attendance: 67,685
- Referee: Tony Corrente
- TV announcers (Fox): Chris Myers, Daryl Johnston and Laura Okmin
- Recap, Game Book

Game information

**First quarter**

- BUF – Cole Beasley 6-yard pass from Josh Allen (Steven Hauschka kick), 8:19. Bills 7–0. **Drive: 8 plays, 54 yards, 3:56.**
- BUF – Steven Hauschka 42-yard field goal, 0:23. Bills 10–0. **Drive: 12 plays, 66 yards, 5:43.**

**Second quarter**

- WAS – Dustin Hopkins 29-yard field goal, 10:42. Bills 10–3. **Drive: 8 plays, 71 yards, 4:41.**
- BUF – Josh Allen 1-yard run (Steven Hauschka kick), 4:45. Bills 17–3. **Drive: 11 plays, 39 yards, 5:57.**
- WAS – Dustin Hopkins 33-yard field goal, 0:32. Bills 17–6. **Drive: 8 plays, 55 yards, 4:13.**

**Third quarter**

- WAS – Dustin Hopkins 39-yard field goal, 1:21. Bills 17–9. **Drive: 6 plays, 14 yards, 3:03.**

**Fourth quarter**

- BUF – Devin Singletary 2-yard run (Steven Hauschka kick), 2:21. Bills 24–9. **Drive: 8 plays, 46 yards, 3:34.**

**Top passers**

- WAS – Dwayne Haskins – 15/22, 144 yards
- BUF – Josh Allen – 14/20, 160 yards, TD

**Top rushers**

- WAS – Adrian Peterson – 18 rushes, 108 yards
- BUF – Devin Singletary – 20 rushes, 95 yards, TD

**Top receivers**

- WAS – Paul Richardson – 4 receptions, 42 yards
- BUF – John Brown – 4 receptions, 76 yards

==== Week 11: vs. New York Jets ====
Week Eleven: New York Jets at Washington Redskins – Game summary

Quarter	1	2	3	4	Total
**Jets**	6	14	0	14	**34**
Redskins	0	3	0	14	**17**

at FedEx Field, Landover, Maryland

- Date: November 17
- Game time: 1:00 p.m. EST
- Game weather: Cloudy, 43 °F (6 °C)
- Game attendance: 56,426
- Referee: Jerome Boger
- TV announcers (Fox): Kenny Albert, Ronde Barber and Sara Walsh
- Recap, Game Book

Game information

**First quarter**

- NYJ - Daniel Brown 20-yard pass from Sam Darnold (kick failed), 11:50. Jets 6-0. **Drive: 7 plays, 75 yards, 3:10.**

**Second quarter**

- NYJ - Robby Anderson 6-yard pass from Sam Darnold (Sam Ficken kick), 14:01. Jets 13-0. **Drive: 12 plays, 62 yards, 5:24.**
- WAS - Dustin Hopkins 44-yard field goal, 9:05. Jets 13-3. **Drive: 4 plays, -10 yards, 1:26.**
- NYJ - Ryan Griffin 16-yard pass from Sam Darnold (Sam Ficken kick), 0:36. Jets 20-3. **Drive: 3 plays, 82 yards, 0:43.**

**Third quarter**

- No scoring plays.

**Fourth quarter**

- NYJ - Jamison Crowder 29-yard pass from Sam Darnold (Sam Ficken kick), 13:11. Jets 27-3. **Drive: 10 plays, 60 yards, 4:33.**
- NYJ - Le'Veon Bell 1-yard run (Sam Ficken kick), 12:15. Jets 34-3. **Drive: 2 plays, 5 yards, 0:42.**
- WAS - Derrius Guice 45-yard pass from Dwayne Haskins (Dwayne Haskins - Trey Quinn pass), 9:59. Jets 34-11. **Drive: 6 plays, 69 yards, 2:16.**
- WAS - Jeremy Sprinkle 1-yard pass from Dwayne Haskins (pass failed), 1:11. Jets 34-17. **Drive: 7 plays, 49 yards, 1:55.**

**Top passers**

- WAS – Dwayne Haskins – 19/35, 214 yards, 2 TD, INT
- NYJ – Sam Darnold – 19/30, 293 yards, 4 TD, INT

**Top rushers**

- WAS – Adrian Peterson – 9 rushes, 25 yards
- NYJ – Le'Veon Bell – 18 rushes, 59 yards

**Top receivers**

- WAS – Terry McLaurin – 3 receptions, 69 yards
- NYJ – Ryan Griffin – 5 receptions, 109 yards, TD

==== Week 12: vs. Detroit Lions ====
Week Twelve: Detroit Lions at Washington Redskins – Game summary

Quarter	1	2	3	4	Total
Lions	0	6	7	3	**16**
**Redskins**	3	10	0	6	**19**

at FedEx Field, Landover, Maryland

- Date: November 24
- Game time: 1:00 p.m. EST
- Game weather: Sunny, 46 °F (8 °C)
- Game attendance: 57,754
- Referee: Bill Vinovich
- TV announcers (Fox): Kenny Albert, Ronde Barber and Lindsay Czarniak
- Recap, Game Book

Game information

**First quarter**

- WAS – Dustin Hopkins 28-yard field goal, 2:31. Redskins 3–0. **Drive: 14 plays, 60 yards, 7:21.**

**Second quarter**

- DET – Matt Prater 24-yard field goal, 13:09. Tied 3–3. **Drive: 10 plays, 71 yards, 4:22.**
- WAS – Steven Sims 91-yard kickoff return (Dustin Hopkins kick), 12:54. Redskins 10–3. **Drive: 0 plays, 0 yards, 0:15.**
- WAS – Dustin Hopkins 37-yard field goal, 5:44. Redskins 13–3. **Drive: 7 plays, 32 yards, 4:24.**
- DET – Matt Prater 49-yard field goal, 0:14. Redskins 13–6. **Drive: 6 plays, 27 yards, 0:51.**

**Third quarter**

- DET – Logan Thomas 12-yard pass from Jeff Driskel (Matt Prater kick), 10:03. Tied 13–13. **Drive: 9 plays, 75 yards, 4:57.**

**Fourth quarter**

- DET – Matt Prater 21-yard field goal, 12:01. Lions 16–13. **Drive: 11 plays, 47 yards, 4:10.**
- WAS – Dustin Hopkins 42-yard field goal, 1:49. Tied 16–16. **Drive: 9 plays, 54 yards, 3:42.**
- WAS – Dustin Hopkins 39-yard field goal, 0:16. Redskins 19–16. **Drive: 6 plays, 33 yards, 0:32.**

**Top passers**

- DET – Jeff Driskel – 20/33, 207 yards, TD, 3 INT
- WAS – Dwayne Haskins – 13/29, 156 yards, INT

**Top rushers**

- DET – Bo Scarbrough – 18 rushes, 98 yards
- WAS – Derrius Guice – 10 rushes, 32 yards

**Top receivers**

- DET – Kenny Golladay – 4 receptions, 61 yards
- WAS – Terry McLaurin – 5 receptions, 72 yards

This was the team's lone home victory of the season, as well as the final one as the "Redskins", as the name was retired in the wake of George Floyd protests in 2020.

==== Week 13: at Carolina Panthers ====
Week Thirteen: Washington Redskins at Carolina Panthers – Game summary

Quarter	1	2	3	4	Total
**Redskins**	3	9	3	14	**29**
Panthers	14	0	0	7	**21**

at Bank of America Stadium, Charlotte, North Carolina

- Date: December 1
- Game time: 1:00 p.m. EST
- Game weather: Cloudy, 64 °F (18 °C)
- Game attendance: 71,504
- Referee: Scott Novak
- TV announcers (CBS): Greg Gumbel, Trent Green and Melanie Collins
- Recap, Game Book

Game information

**First quarter**

- CAR – Curtis Samuel 4-yard pass from Kyle Allen (Joey Slye kick), 10:39. Panthers 7–0. **Drive: 8 plays, 75 yards, 4:21.**
- CAR – D. J. Moore 13-yard pass from Kyle Allen (Joey Slye kick), 5:18. Panthers 14–0. **Drive: 6 plays, 55 yards, 3:09.**
- WAS – Dustin Hopkins 25-yard field goal, 3:09. Panthers 14–3. **Drive: 6 plays, 68 yards, 2:09.**

**Second quarter**

- WAS – Dustin Hopkins 42-yard field goal, 11:16. Panthers 14–6. **Drive: 9 plays, 41 yards, 3:35.**
- WAS – Derrius Guice 1-yard run (pass failed), 4:33. Panthers 14–12. **Drive: 1 play, 1 yard, 0:03.**

**Third quarter**

- WAS – Dustin Hopkins 36-yard field goal, 8:33. Redskins 15–14. **Drive: 11 plays, 57 yards, 6:27.**

**Fourth quarter**

- WAS – Derrius Guice 1-yard run (Dustin Hopkins kick), 9:09. Redskins 22–14. **Drive: 7 plays, 67 yards, 3:42.**
- WAS – Adrian Peterson 12-yard run (Dustin Hopkins kick), 4:26. Redskins 29–14. **Drive: 5 plays, 55 yards, 3:04.**
- CAR – Kyle Allen 17-yard run (Joey Slye kick), 1:51. Redskins 29–21. **Drive: 12 plays, 75 yards, 2:35.**

**Top passers**

- WAS – Dwayne Haskins – 13/25, 147 yards
- CAR – Kyle Allen – 27/46, 278 yards, 2 TD, INT

**Top rushers**

- WAS – Derrius Guice – 10 rushes, 129 yards, 2 TD
- CAR – Christian McCaffrey – 14 rushes, 44 yards

**Top receivers**

- WAS – Kelvin Harmon – 3 receptions, 51 yards
- CAR – D. J. Moore – 6 receptions, 75 yards, TD

==== Week 14: at Green Bay Packers ====
Week Fourteen: Washington Redskins at Green Bay Packers – Game summary

Quarter	1	2	3	4	Total
Redskins	0	6	3	6	**15**
**Packers**	14	0	3	3	**20**

at Lambeau Field, Green Bay, Wisconsin

- Date: December 8
- Game time: 1:00 p.m. EST/12:00 p.m. CST
- Game weather: Cloudy, 37 °F (3 °C)
- Game attendance: 77,296
- Referee: Clay Martin
- TV announcers (Fox): Kenny Albert, Ronde Barber and Lindsay Czarniak
- Recap, Game Book

Game information

**First quarter**

- GB – Aaron Jones 7-yard run (Mason Crosby kick), 9:06. Packers 7–0. **Drive: 7 plays, 55 yards, 3:44.**
- GB – Robert Tonyan 12-yard pass from Aaron Rodgers (Mason Crosby kick), 0:34. Packers 14–0. **Drive: 5 plays, 57 yards, 3:06.**

**Second quarter**

- WAS – Adrian Peterson 2-yard run (kick failed), 3:44. Packers 14–6. **Drive: 11 plays, 95 yards, 5:46.**

**Third quarter**

- GB – Mason Crosby 32-yard field goal, 10:08. Packers 17–6. **Drive: 10 plays, 60 yards, 4:52.**
- WAS – Dustin Hopkins 52-yard field goal, 0:11. Packers 17–9. **Drive: 12 plays, 37 yards, 6:34.**

**Fourth quarter**

- GB – Mason Crosby 33-yard field goal, 2:34. Packers 20–9. **Drive: 14 plays, 74 yards, 7:24.**
- WAS – Terry McLaurin 13-yard pass from Dwayne Haskins (run failed), 1:17. Packers 20–15. **Drive: 8 plays, 75 yards, 1:17.**

**Top passers**

- WAS – Dwayne Haskins – 16/27, 170 yards, TD, INT
- GB – Aaron Rodgers – 18/28, 195 yards, TD

**Top rushers**

- WAS – Adrian Peterson – 20 rushes, 76 yards, TD
- GB – Aaron Jones – 16 rushes, 134 yards, TD

**Top receivers**

- WAS – Terry McLaurin – 4 receptions, 57 yards, TD
- GB – Aaron Jones – 6 receptions, 58 yards

With the loss, the Redskins were eliminated from playoff contention for the fourth straight season.

==== Week 15: vs. Philadelphia Eagles ====
Week Fifteen: Philadelphia Eagles at Washington Redskins – Game summary

Quarter	1	2	3	4	Total
**Eagles**	3	7	7	20	**37**
Redskins	7	7	0	13	**27**

at FedEx Field, Landover, Maryland

- Date: December 15
- Game time: 1:00 p.m. EST
- Game weather: Sunny, 52 °F (11 °C)
- Game attendance: 63,246
- Referee: Shawn Smith
- TV announcers (Fox): Thom Brennaman, Chris Spielman and Shannon Spake
- Recap, Game Book

Game information

**First quarter**

- PHI - Jake Elliott 25-yard field goal, 1:23. Eagles 3-0. **Drive: 16 plays, 88 yards, 7:40.**
- WAS - Terry McLaurin 75-yard pass from Dwayne Haskins (Dustin Hopkins kick), 1:11. Redskins 7-3. **Drive: 1 play, 75 yards, 0:12.**

**Second quarter**

- PHI - Miles Sanders 1-yard run (Jake Elliott kick), 9:53. Eagles 10-7. **Drive: 10 plays, 75 yards, 6:18.**
- WAS - Steven Sims 5-yard pass from Dwayne Haskins (Dustin Hopkins kick), 6:58. Redskins 14-10. **Drive: 7 plays, 75 yards, 2:55.**

**Third quarter**

- PHI - Miles Sanders 15-yard pass from Carson Wentz (Jake Elliott kick), 5:53. Eagles 17-14. **Drive: 12 plays, 66 yards, 6:02.**

**Fourth quarter**

- WAS - Adrian Peterson 10-yard run (Dustin Hopkins kick), 14:53. Redskins 21-17. **Drive: 10 plays, 75 yards, 6:00.**
- PHI - Zach Ertz 2-yard pass from Carson Wentz (Jake Elliott kick), 9:59. Eagles 24-21. **Drive: 8 plays, 75 yards, 4:54.**
- WAS - Dustin Hopkins 53-yard field goal, 8:02. Tied 24-24. **Drive: 6 plays, 20 yards, 1:57.**
- WAS - Dustin Hopkins 43-yard field goal, 4:52. Redskins 27-24. **Drive: 4 plays, 9 yards, 1:36.**
- PHI - Greg Ward 4-yard pass from Carson Wentz (Jake Elliott kick), 0:26. Eagles, 31-27. **Drive: 11 plays, 75 yards, 4:26.**
- PHI - Nigel Bradham 48-yard fumble return, 0:00. Eagles 37-27.

**Top passers**

- PHI - Carson Wentz - 30/43, 266 yards, 3 TD
- WAS - Dwayne Haskins - 19/28, 261 yards, 2 TD

**Top rushers**

- PHI - Miles Sanders - 19 rushes, 122 yards, TD
- WAS - Adrian Peterson - 16 rushes, 66 yards, TD

**Top receivers**

- PHI - Greg Ward - 7 receptions, 61 yards, TD
- WAS - Terry McLaurin - 5 receptions, 130 yards, TD

==== Week 16: vs. New York Giants ====
Week Sixteen: New York Giants at Washington Redskins – Game summary

Quarter	1	2	3	4	OT	Total
**Giants**	14	14	7	0	6	**41**
Redskins	7	7	7	14	0	**35**

at FedEx Field, Landover, Maryland

- Date: December 22
- Game time: 1:00 p.m. EST
- Game weather: Clear, 44 °F (7 °C)
- Game attendance: 66,083
- Referee: Ronald Torbert
- TV announcers (Fox): Thom Brennaman, Chris Spielman and Shannon Spake
- Recap, Game Book

Game information

**First quarter**

- NYG - Sterling Shepard 23-yard pass from Daniel Jones (Aldrick Rosas kick), 12:21. Giants 7-0. **Drive: 5 plays, 75 yards, 2:39.**
- WAS - Steven Sims 10-yard pass from Dwayne Haskins (Dustin Hopkins kick), 7:37. Tied 7-7. **Drive: 9 plays, 75 yards, 4:44.**
- NYG - Saquon Barkley 67-yard run (Aldrick Rosas kick), 6:46. Giants 14-7. **Drive: 2 plays, 75 yards, 0:51.**

**Second quarter**

- WAS - Hale Hentges 6-yard pass from Dwayne Haskins (Dustin Hopkins kick), 14:56. 'Tied 14-14. **Drive: 12 plays, 75 yards, 6:50.**
- NYG - Saquon Barkley 33-yard pass from Daniel Jones (Aldrick Rosas kick), 9:16. Giants 21-14. **Drive: 10 plays, 75 yards, 5:40.**
- NYG - Cody Latimer 10-yard pass from Daniel Jones (Aldrick Rosas kick), 0:38. Giants 28-14. **Drive: 9 plays, 73 yards, 1:41.**

**Third quarter**

- WAS - Steven Sims 7-yard pass from Case Keenum (Dustin Hopkins kick), 6:38. Giants 28-21. **Drive: 7 plays, 60 yards, 3:41.**
- NYG - Kaden Smith 9-yard pass from Daniel Jones (Aldrick Rosas kick), 3:40. Giants 35-21. **Drive: 5 plays, 73 yards, 2:58.**

**Fourth quarter**

- WAS - Adrian Peterson 1-yard run (Dustin Hopkins kick), 14:30. Giants 35-28. **Drive: 1 play, 17 yards, 0:08.**
- WAS - Case Keenum 1-yard run (Dustin Hopkins kick), 0:29. Tied 35-35. **Drive: 14 plays, 99 yards, 5:59.**

**Overtime**

- NYG - Kaden Smith 3-yard pass from Daniel Jones, 4:15. Giants 41-35. **Drive: 11 plays, 66 yards, 5:45.**

**Top passers**

- NYG - Daniel Jones - 28/42, 352 yards, 5 TD
- WAS - Case Keenum - 16/22, 158 yards, 2 TD

**Top rushers**

- NYG - Saquon Barkley - 22 rushes, 189 yards, TD
- WAS - Adrian Peterson - 15 rushes, 36 yards, TD

**Top receivers**

- NYG - Golden Tate - 6 receptions, 96 yards
- WAS - Terry McLaurin - 7 receptions, 86 yards

The Redskins were defeated by the Giants in overtime, which resulted in them getting swept by the Giants and finishing dead last in the NFC East for their first time since 2014. Washington also finished the season 1–7 at home. This was also the team's final home game as the "Redskins", as the branding was dropped in the wake of the George Floyd protests the next year.

==== Week 17: at Dallas Cowboys ====
Week Seventeen: Washington Redskins at Dallas Cowboys – Game summary

Quarter	1	2	3	4	Total
Redskins	0	10	6	0	**16**
**Cowboys**	6	14	17	10	**47**

at AT&T Stadium, Arlington, Texas

- Date: December 29
- Game time: 4:25 p.m. EST/3:25 p.m. CST
- Game weather: None (retractable roof closed)
- Referee: Craig Wrolstad
- TV announcers (Fox): Joe Buck, Troy Aikman and Erin Andrews
- Recap, Game Book

Game information

**First quarter**

- DAL - Kai Forbath 28-yard field goal, 7:41. Cowboys 3-0. **Drive: 10 plays, 26 yards, 4:54.**
- DAL - Kai Forbath 47-yard field goal, 5:15. Cowboys 6-0. **Drive: 4 plays, -8 yards, 1:28.**

**Second quarter**

- WAS - Dustin Hopkins 31-yard field goal, 13:37. Cowboys 6-3. **Drive: 4 plays, 3 yards, 0:57.**
- DAL - Ezekiel Elliott 13-yard pass from Dak Prescott (Kai Forbath kick), 11:01. Cowboys 13-3. **Drive: 7 plays, 75 yards, 2:36.**
- DAL - Ezekiel Elliott 33-yard run (Kai Forbath kick), 3:50. Cowboys 20-3. **Drive: 6 plays, 61 yards, 2:44.**
- WAS - Steven Sims 6-yard pass from Case Keenum (Dustin Hopkins kick), 0:34. Cowboys 20-10. **Drive: 10 plays, 74 yards, 3:16.**

**Third quarter**

- WAS - Dustin Hopkins 42-yard field goal, 11:54. Cowboys 20-13. **Drive: 6 plays, 58 yards, 3:06.**
- DAL - Michael Gallup 4-yard pass from Dak Prescott (Kai Forbath kick), 8:17. Cowboys 27-13. **Drive: 7 plays, 75 yards, 3:37.**
- WAS - Dustin Hopkins 28-yard field goal, 7:00. Cowboys 27-16. **Drive: 5 plays, 65 yards, 1:17.**
- DAL - Kai Forbath 48-yard field goal, 4:07. Cowboys 30-16. **Drive: 7 plays, 43 yards, 2:53.**
- DAL - Michael Gallup 32-yard pass from Dak Prescott (Kai Forbath kick), 0:52. Cowboys 37-16. **Drive: 4 plays, 53 yards, 2:00.**

**Fourth quarter**

- DAL - Michael Gallup 45-yard pass from Dak Prescott (Kai Forbath kick), 12:46. Cowboys 44-16. **Drive: 3 plays, 49 yards, 0:51.**
- DAL - Kai Forbath 40-yard field goal, 2:40. Cowboys 47-16. **Drive: 15 plays, 72 yards, 8:22.**

**Top passers**

- WAS - Case Keenum - 18/37, 206 yards, TD, INT
- DAL - Dak Prescott - 23/33, 303, 4 TD

**Top rushers**

- WAS - Adrian Peterson - 13 rushes, 78 yards
- DAL - Ezekiel Elliott - 18 rushes, 122 yards, TD

**Top receivers**

- WAS - Steven Sims - 5 receptions, 81 yards, TD
- DAL - Michael Gallup - 5 receptions, 98 yards, 3 TD

This was Bruce Allen's final game as team president as he along with several other front office members, were fired. This was also their final game as the "Redskins", as the branding was retired several months later. The Redskins also ended the year 2–6 on the road.

Several fans were pleased when they learning of Bruce's firing, claiming that it was "the best day ever".

=== Standings ===
==== Division ====
NFC East
	W	L	T	PCT	DIV	CONF	PF	PA	STK
^{(4)} Philadelphia Eagles	9	7	0	.563	5–1	7–5	385	354	W4
Dallas Cowboys	8	8	0	.500	5–1	7–5	434	321	W1
New York Giants	4	12	0	.250	2–4	3–9	341	451	L1
Washington Redskins	3	13	0	.188	0–6	2–10	266	435	L4

==== Conference ====
NFC
#	Team	Division	W	L	T	PCT	DIV	CONF	SOS	SOV	STK
**Division leaders**
1 (Note: San Francisco finished ahead of Green Bay and New Orleans based on head-to-head sweep, claiming the No. 1 seed.)	San Francisco 49ers	West	13	3	0	.813	5–1	10–2	.504	.466	W2
2 (Note: Green Bay claimed the No. 2 seed over New Orleans based on conference record.)	Green Bay Packers	North	13	3	0	.813	6–0	10–2	.453	.428	W5
3	New Orleans Saints	South	13	3	0	.813	5–1	9–3	.486	.459	W3
4	Philadelphia Eagles	East	9	7	0	.563	5–1	7–5	.455	.417	W4
**Wild Cards**
5	Seattle Seahawks	West	11	5	0	.688	3–3	8–4	.531	.463	L2
6	Minnesota Vikings	North	10	6	0	.625	2–4	7–5	.477	.356	L2
**Did not qualify for the postseason**
7	Los Angeles Rams	West	9	7	0	.563	3–3	7–5	.535	.438	W1
8 (Note: Chicago finished ahead of Dallas based on head-to-head victory.)	Chicago Bears	North	8	8	0	.500	4–2	7–5	.508	.383	W1
9	Dallas Cowboys	East	8	8	0	.500	5–1	7–5	.479	.316	W1
10 (Note: Atlanta finished ahead of Tampa Bay based on division record.)	Atlanta Falcons	South	7	9	0	.438	4–2	6–6	.545	.518	W4
11	Tampa Bay Buccaneers	South	7	9	0	.438	2–4	5–7	.500	.384	L2
12	Arizona Cardinals	West	5	10	1	.344	1–5	3–8–1	.529	.375	L1
13	Carolina Panthers	South	5	11	0	.313	1–5	2–10	.549	.469	L8
14	New York Giants	East	4	12	0	.250	2–4	3–9	.473	.281	L1
15	Detroit Lions	North	3	12	1	.219	0–6	2–9–1	.506	.375	L9
16	Washington Redskins	East	3	13	0	.188	0–6	2–10	.502	.281	L4
**Tiebreakers** (Note: When breaking ties for three or more teams under the NFL's rules, they are first broken within divisions, then comparing only the highest-ranked remaining team from each division.)

== See also ==
- List of notable organizational conflicts in the NFL
