= Daronte Jones =

American football coach (born 1978)

Washington Commanders
- Title: Defensive coordinator

Personal information
- Born: November 11, 1978 (age 47); Capitol Heights, Maryland, U.S.

Career information
- Position: Cornerback
- High school: Bishop McNamara (Forestville, Maryland)
- College: Temple (1996); Morgan State (1997–2000)

Career history
- Lenoir–Rhyne Bears (2001) Graduate assistant; Nicholls State Colonels (2002) Safeties coach; Franklin HS (2003) Defensive coordinator; Jeanerette HS (2004) Defensive coordinator; Bowie State Bulldogs (2005–2009) Assistant head coach & defensive coordinator; UCLA Bruins (2010) Cornerbacks coach; Montreal Alouettes (2011) Defensive backs coach; Hawaii Rainbow Warriors (2012–2014); Secondary coach (2012–2013); Assistant head coach & secondary coach (2014); Wisconsin Badgers (2015) Defensive backs coach; Miami Dolphins (2016–2017) Assistant defensive backs coach; Cincinnati Bengals (2018–2019) Cornerbacks coach; Minnesota Vikings (2020) Defensive backs coach; LSU Tigers (2021) Defensive coordinator; Minnesota Vikings (2022–2025); Defensive backs coach (2022); Defensive backs coach & pass game coordinator (2023–2025); Washington Commanders (2026–present) Defensive coordinator
- Coaching profile at Pro Football Reference

Daronte Jones (born November 11, 1978) is an American professional football coach who is the defensive coordinator for the Washington Commanders of the National Football League (NFL). Jones has also served as the defensive coordinator of the Bowie State Bulldogs and LSU Tigers in college football and as an assistant for other college and NFL teams.

== Playing career ==
Jones played as a cornerback for one season at Temple in 1996 before transferring to Morgan State University. Nerve damage to his neck prematurely ended his playing career; a doctor warned that if he continued playing football, he was at risk of paralysis. Remaining on scholarship but unable to play, head coach Stump Mitchell asked him to assist with coaching the team’s defensive backs. He remained in this role until his graduation.

== Coaching career ==
=== Early coaching career ===
After being a graduate assistant at Lenoir–Rhyne and coaching safeties at Nicholls State, he was a defensive coordinator for two years at two separate Louisiana high schools. From 2005 to 2009, Jones was assistant head coach and defensive coordinator at Bowie State University in his home state of Maryland. He spent the 2010 season coaching at UCLA. After a one-year stint coaching the Montreal Allouettes of the CFL, he spent 3 years coaching at Hawaii. He then would spend a year in the Big 10 coaching at Wisconsin.

Jones then began coaching in the National Football League (NFL) with the Miami Dolphins, where he worked as assistant defensive backs coach for two seasons. The next two years he spent coaching the secondary for the Cincinnati Bengals. In 2020 he was the defensive backs coach for the Minnesota Vikings.

=== LSU ===
Jones served the 2021 season as the defensive coordinator of the LSU on January 26, 2021. He was not retained following the season after head coach Ed Orgeron was fired that October.

=== Minnesota Vikings ===
On February 23, 2022, Jones returned to the Minnesota Vikings in 2022 as the team's defensive backs coach. He was promoted with the additional title of pass game coordinator in 2023.

=== Washington Commanders ===
On January 30, 2026, Jones joined the Washington Commanders as defensive coordinator under head coach Dan Quinn.
