= 2025 Washington Commanders season =

94th season in franchise history

- Owner: Josh Harris
- General manager: Adam Peters
- President: Mark Clouse
- Head coach: Dan Quinn
- Offensive coordinator: Kliff Kingsbury
- Defensive coordinator: Joe Whitt Jr.
- Home stadium: Northwest Stadium

Results
- Record: 5–12
- Division place: 3rd NFC East
- Playoffs: Did not qualify
- Pro Bowlers: P Tress Way

Uniform
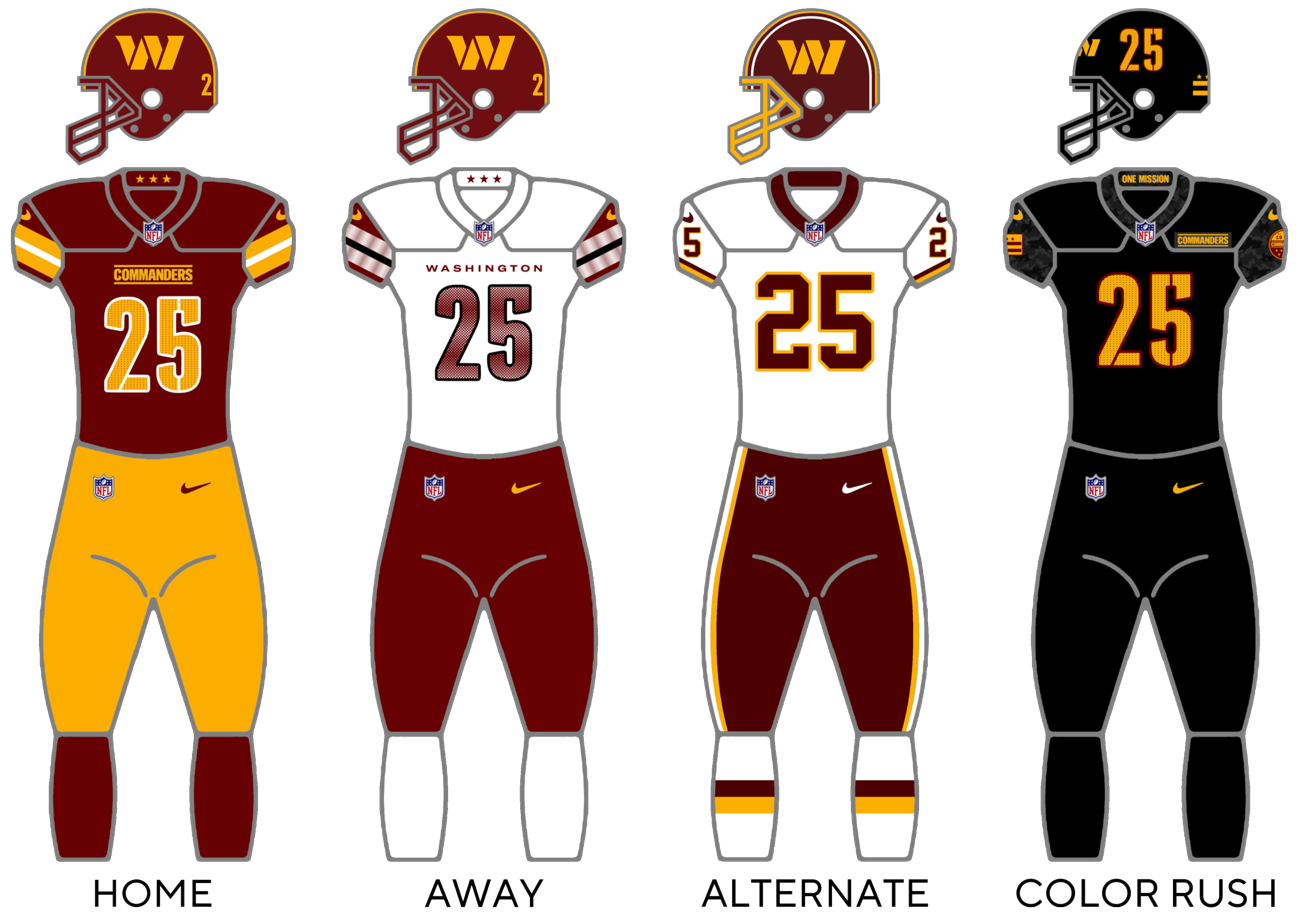

The 2025 season was the Washington Commanders' 94th in the National Football League (NFL) and their second under the tandem of general manager Adam Peters and head coach Dan Quinn.

Despite a 3–2 start, the Commanders subsequently went on a 8-game losing streak afterwards to fall to 3–10, as numerous injuries to key players (including quarterback Jayden Daniels and wide receiver Terry McLaurin) and poor defensive play plagued the team. The Commanders failed to improve upon their 12–5 record from the previous season after a loss to the Kansas City Chiefs in Week 8, ensured a worse record the following week with a loss to the Seattle Seahawks, and instead went 5–12. Their 3–10 was their worst start since 2019 when they were known as the Redskins. They were the first NFL team since the 2002 Arizona Cardinals to lose four consecutive games by 21 or more points. Washington was officially knocked out of playoff contention after a shutout loss to the Minnesota Vikings in Week 14.

== Overview ==
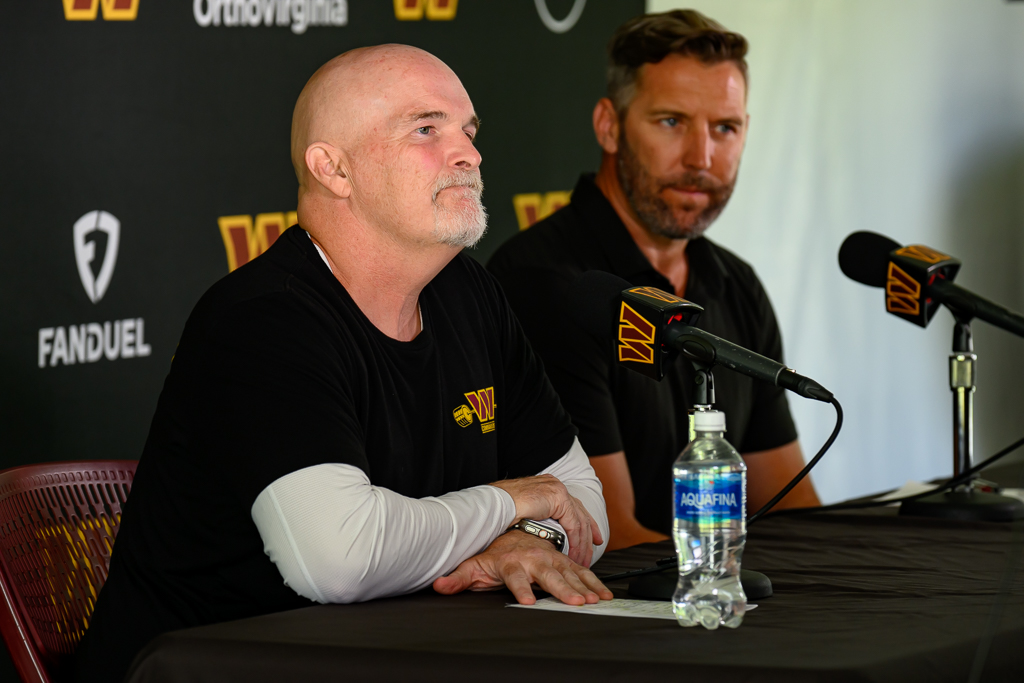
Head coach Dan Quinn (forefront) and general manager Adam Peters speaking at the start of training camp

The front office saw the addition of former Campbell's CEO Mark Clouse as team president and the retirements of senior personnel executive Martin Mayhew and advisor Marty Hurney. The coaching staff saw Brian Schneider replace John Glenn, who left to become the linebackers coach of the Las Vegas Raiders, as assistant special teams coordinator.

In the offseason, the Commanders traded draft picks for Houston Texans left tackle Laremy Tunsil and San Francisco 49ers wide receiver Deebo Samuel. Notable free agents signed include defensive ends Deatrich Wise Jr. and Jacob Martin, outside linebacker Von Miller, defensive tackles Javon Kinlaw and Eddie Goldman, cornerback Jonathan Jones, safety Will Harris, and kicker Matt Gay. In July, the Commanders revealed "Super Bowl Era" alternate uniforms resembling those of the franchise's former Super Bowl-winning teams. The Commanders had five players listed in the NFL Top 100 Players of 2025, which was revealed during the lead up to the season. Included were Jayden Daniels (21), Terry McLaurin (52), Frankie Luvu (70), Bobby Wagner (74), and Laremy Tunsil (86). (Note: Tunsil was with the Houston Texans in 2024)

== Draft ==
Player selections and trades
Round	Pick	Player	Position	College	Notes
1	29	Josh Conerly Jr.	Offensive tackle	Oregon	—
2	61	Trey Amos	Cornerback	Ole Miss	—
3	79	Traded to the Houston Texans (Note: The Commanders traded third- and seventh-round selections (79th and 236th overall), and 2026 second- and fourth-round selections to the Houston Texans in exchange for a fourth-round selection (128th overall) and LT Laremy Tunsil.)			From Dolphins via Eagles (Note: The Commanders traded a fifth-round selection and WR Jahan Dotson to the Philadelphia Eagles in exchange for two seventh-round selections and a conditional third-round selection. The condition – that Washington would receive the higher of Miami or Philadelphia's third-round selection in 2025 – was converted on December 8, 2024, when the Eagles clinched a playoff spot, ensuring the Dolphins' pick would be higher than the Eagles' own.)
3	93	Traded to the New Orleans Saints (Note: The Commanders traded third-, fourth-, and sixth-round selections to the New Orleans Saints in exchange for a fifth-round selection and CB Marshon Lattimore.)			—
4	128	Jaylin Lane	Wide receiver	Virginia Tech	From Texans
4	131	Traded to the New Orleans Saints			—
5	147	Traded to the San Francisco 49ers (Note: The Commanders traded a fifth-round selection to the San Francisco 49ers in exchange for WR Deebo Samuel.)			From Saints
5	165	Traded to the Philadelphia Eagles			—
6	184	Traded to the New Orleans Saints			From Saints (Note: The Commanders traded a seventh-round selection and DT John Ridgeway III to the New Orleans Saints in exchange for a sixth-round selection.)
6	205	Kain Medrano	Linebacker	UCLA	—
7	236	Traded to the Houston Texans			From Broncos via Eagles
7	245	Jacory Croskey-Merritt	Running back	Arizona	—
7	248	Traded to the New Orleans Saints			From Eagles

Undrafted free agents
Player	Position	College
Kam Arnold	Linebacker	Boston College
Ricky Barber	Defensive tackle	UCF
Ja'Corey Brooks	Wide receiver	Louisville
Fentrell Cypress	Cornerback	Florida State
Jacoby Jones	Wide receiver	UCF
Ale Kaho	Linebacker	UCLA
Robert McDaniel	Safety	Jackson State
Timothy McKay	Guard	NC State
Trey Rucker	Safety	Oklahoma State
Car'lin Vigers	Cornerback	Louisiana–Monroe

== Staff ==
2025 Washington Commanders staff
Front office: Managing partner – Josh Harris; Limited partners – Mitchell Rales, Magic Johnson, Mark Ein; General manager – Adam Peters; Assistant general manager – Lance Newmark; Senior vice president of football operations – Brandon Sosna; Senior advisor to the general manager – Doug Williams; President – Mark Clouse; Vice president of football administration – Rob Rogers; Director of player personnel – David Blackburn; Personnel executive – Scott Fitterer; Director of college scouting – Tim Gribble; Director of pro scouting – Chris White; Scouts – Dwaune Jones, Paul Skansi; Personnel analyst – Wes Welker; Special advisor – Bob Myers; Head coaches: Head coach – Dan Quinn; Assistant head coach/offensive pass game coordinator – Brian Johnson; Offensive coaches: Offensive coordinator – Kliff Kingsbury; Run game coordinator/running backs – Anthony Lynn; Quarterbacks – Tavita Pritchard; Assistant quarterbacks – David Blough; Wide receivers – Bobby Engram; Tight ends – David Raih; Offensive line – Bobby Johnson; Assistant offensive line – Darnell Stapleton; Offensive assistant – Andre Coleman; Offensive quality control – Shane Toub, Jesse Madden	Defensive coaches: Defensive coordinator – Joe Whitt Jr.; Defensive pass game coordinator – Jason Simmons; Defensive line – Darryl Tapp; Assistant defensive line – Sharrif Floyd; Linebackers – Ken Norton Jr.; Assistant linebackers/pass rush specialist – Ryan Kerrigan; Defensive backs – Tommy Donatell; Assistant defensive backs – William Gay; Senior defensive assistant – John Pagano; Defensive quality control – George Banko; Special teams coaches: Special teams coordinator – Larry Izzo; Assistant special teams – Brian Schneider; Support staff and coaches: Senior vice president of football initiatives – Dave Gardi; Senior director of team support and advancement – Dylan Thompson; Senior director of player health and performance – Tim McGrath; Director of player performance – Brett Nenaber; Director of process innovation – Cody Cejda; Director of football R&D – Doug Drewry; Head strength and conditioning – Chad Englehart; Head athletic trainer – Al Bellamy; Coaching chief of staff – Sarah Hogan; Player development – Pete Ohnegian

== Final roster ==
2025 Washington Commanders roster
Quarterbacks (QB): 5 Jayden Daniels; 2 Jeff Driskel; 15 Sam Hartman; 14 Josh Johnson; 8 Marcus Mariota; Running backs (RB): 22 Jacory Croskey-Merritt; 38 Chase Edmonds; 26 Jeremy McNichols; 36 Chris Rodriguez Jr.; Wide receivers (WR): 13 Treylon Burks; 17 Terry McLaurin; 19 Chris Moore; 1 Deebo Samuel; Tight ends (TE): 87 John Bates; 82 Ben Sinnott; 80 Colson Yankoff	Offensive linemen (OL): 67 Nick Allegretti C; 74 Brandon Coleman LG; 72 Josh Conerly Jr. RT; 77 George Fant LT; 61 Julian Good-Jones G; 75 Chris Paul LG; 73 Trent Scott RT; 78 Laremy Tunsil LT; 71 Andrew Wylie RG; Defensive linemen (DL): 98 Sheldon Day DT; 96 Jalyn Holmes DE; 93 Drake Jackson DE; 99 Javon Kinlaw DT; 55 Jacob Martin DE; 95 Jer'Zhan Newton DT; 94 Daron Payne DT; 52 Preston Smith DE; 79 Shy Tuttle DT	Linebackers (LB): 57 Nick Bellore OLB; 51 Ale Kaho OLB; 4 Frankie Luvu OLB; 58 Jordan Magee MLB; 56 Kain Medrano MLB; 24 Von Miller OLB; 54 Bobby Wagner MLB; Defensive backs (DB): 35 Percy Butler SS; 34 Antonio Hamilton CB; 3 Will Harris SS; 6 Noah Igbinoghene CB; 31 Jonathan Jones CB; 20 Quan Martin FS; 18 Tyler Owens SS; 39 Jeremy Reaves SS; 0 Mike Sainristil CB; Special teams (ST): 16 Jake Moody K; 69 Tyler Ott LS; 10 Tress Way P	Practice squad: 64 Malaesala Aumavae–Laulu G; 66 Ricky Barber DT; 88 Ja'Corey Brooks WR (PS/I); 89 Lawrence Cager TE; 12 Robbie Chosen WR; 48 River Cracraft WR; 60 Michael Deiter C; 46 Tre Hawkins CB; 53 D. J. Johnson DE; 84 Jacoby Jones WR; 59 T. J. Maguranyanga DE (IPP); 47 Robert McDaniel FS; 68 Timothy McKay RG; 29 Darius Rush CB (PS/I); 25 Kevon Seymour CB; 41 Gee Scott Jr. TE; 22 Car'lin Vigers CB; 50 DeMarcus Walker DE; Reserve: 23 Trey Amos CB (IR); 92 Dorance Armstrong DE (IR); 63 Tyler Biadasz C (IR); 85 Noah Brown WR (IR); 76 Sam Cosmi RG (IR); 30 Austin Ekeler RB (IR); 86 Zach Ertz TE (IR); 97 Eddie Goldman DT (IR); 80 Tyree Jackson TE (IR); 90 Javontae Jean-Baptiste DE (IR); 83 Jaylin Lane WR (IR); 2 Marshon Lattimore CB (IR); 11 Luke McCaffrey WR (IR); 53 Lucas Niang LT (IR); 91 Deatrich Wise Jr. DE (IR); Rookies in italics 53 active, 15 reserve, 16 practice squad (2 exempt)

== Standings ==
=== Division ===
NFC East
	W	L	T	PCT	DIV	CONF	PF	PA	STK
^{(3)} Philadelphia Eagles	11	6	0	.647	3–3	8–4	379	325	L1
Dallas Cowboys	7	9	1	.441	4–2	4–7–1	471	511	L1
Washington Commanders	5	12	0	.294	3–3	3–9	356	451	W1
New York Giants	4	13	0	.235	2–4	2–10	381	439	W2

=== Conference ===
NFC
Seed	Team	Division	W	L	T	PCT	DIV	CONF	SOS	SOV	STK
Division leaders
1	Seattle Seahawks	West	14	3	0	.824	4–2	9–3	.498	.471	W7
2 (Note: Chicago finished ahead of Philadelphia based on head-to-head victory.)	Chicago Bears	North	11	6	0	.647	2–4	7–5	.458	.406	L2
3	Philadelphia Eagles	East	11	6	0	.647	3–3	8–4	.476	.455	L1
4 (Note: Carolina finished ahead of Tampa Bay and Atlanta based on head-to-head record (Carolina 3–1 to Tampa Bay 2–2 and Atlanta 1–3).)	Carolina Panthers	South	8	9	0	.471	3–3	6–6	.522	.463	L2
Wild cards
5 (Note: LA Rams finished ahead of San Francisco based on common games (LA Rams 9–3 to San Francisco 8–4 against: Arizona, Atlanta, Carolina, Houston, Indianapolis, Jacksonville, New Orleans, Seattle, Tampa Bay and Tennessee).)	Los Angeles Rams	West	12	5	0	.706	4–2	7–5	.526	.485	W1
6	San Francisco 49ers	West	12	5	0	.706	4–2	9–3	.498	.417	L1
7	Green Bay Packers	North	9	7	1	.559	4–2	7–4–1	.483	.431	L4
Did not qualify for the postseason
8 (Note: Minnesota finished ahead of Detroit based on head-to-head sweep.)	Minnesota Vikings	North	9	8	0	.529	4–2	7–5	.514	.431	W5
9	Detroit Lions	North	9	8	0	.529	2–4	6–6	.490	.428	W1
10 (Note: Tampa Bay finished ahead of Atlanta based on common games (Tampa Bay 6–6 to Atlanta 5–7 against: Arizona, Buffalo, Carolina, LA Rams, Miami, New England, New Orleans, NY Jets, San Francisco and Seattle).)	Tampa Bay Buccaneers	South	8	9	0	.471	3–3	6–6	.529	.485	W1
11	Atlanta Falcons	South	8	9	0	.471	3–3	7–5	.495	.449	W4
12	Dallas Cowboys	East	7	9	1	.441	4–2	4–7–1	.438	.311	L1
13	New Orleans Saints	South	6	11	0	.353	3–3	4–8	.495	.333	L1
14	Washington Commanders	East	5	12	0	.294	3–3	3–9	.507	.388	W1
15	New York Giants	East	4	13	0	.235	2–4	2–10	.524	.478	W2
16	Arizona Cardinals	West	3	14	0	.176	0–6	3–9	.571	.422	L9

== Schedule ==
=== Preseason ===
Week	Date	Opponent	Result	Record	Venue	Recap
1	August 8	at New England Patriots	**L** 18–48	0–1	Gillette Stadium	Recap
2	August 18	Cincinnati Bengals	**L** 17–31	0–2	Northwest Stadium	Recap
3	August 23	Baltimore Ravens	**L** 3–30	0–3	Northwest Stadium	Recap

=== Regular season ===
Week	Date	Opponent	Result	Record	Venue	Recap
1	September 7	**New York Giants**	**W** 21–6	1–0	Northwest Stadium	Recap
2	September 11	at Green Bay Packers	**L** 18–27	1–1	Lambeau Field	Recap
3	September 21	Las Vegas Raiders	**W** 41–24	2–1	Northwest Stadium	Recap
4	September 28	at Atlanta Falcons	**L** 27–34	2–2	Mercedes-Benz Stadium	Recap
5	October 5	at Los Angeles Chargers	**W** 27–10	3–2	SoFi Stadium	Recap
6	October 13	Chicago Bears	**L** 24–25	3–3	Northwest Stadium	Recap
7	October 19	at **Dallas Cowboys**	**L** 22–44	3–4	AT&T Stadium	Recap
8	October 27	at Kansas City Chiefs	**L** 7–28	3–5	Arrowhead Stadium	Recap
9	November 2	Seattle Seahawks	**L** 14–38	3–6	Northwest Stadium	Recap
10	November 9	Detroit Lions	**L** 22–44	3–7	Northwest Stadium	Recap
11	November 16	at Miami Dolphins	**L** 13–16 (OT)	3–8	(Spain) Santiago Bernabéu Stadium (Madrid)	Recap
12	Bye					
13	November 30	Denver Broncos	**L** 26–27 (OT)	3–9	Northwest Stadium	Recap
14	December 7	at Minnesota Vikings	**L** 0–31	3–10	U.S. Bank Stadium	Recap
15	December 14	at **New York Giants**	**W** 29–21	4–10	MetLife Stadium	Recap
16	December 20	**Philadelphia Eagles**	**L** 18–29	4–11	Northwest Stadium	Recap
17	December 25	**Dallas Cowboys**	**L** 23–30	4–12	Northwest Stadium	Recap
18	January 4	at **Philadelphia Eagles**	**W** 24–17	5–12	Lincoln Financial Field	Recap

Note: Intra-division opponents are in bold text.

==== Game summaries ====
===== Week 1: vs. New York Giants =====
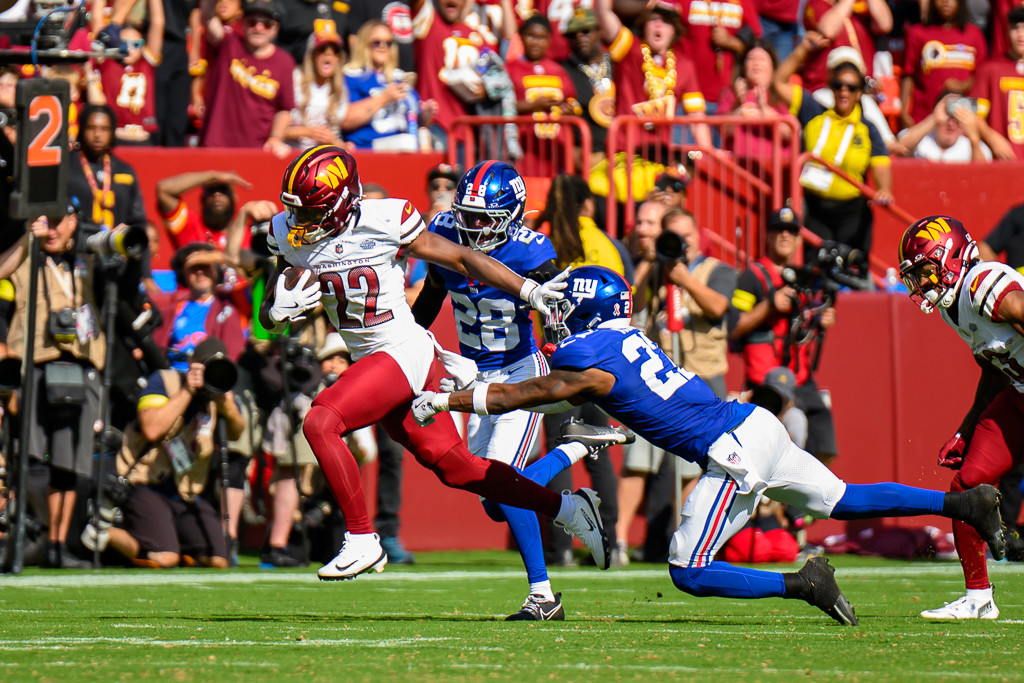
Washington vs. the New York Giants

Week 1: New York Giants at Washington Commanders

Quarter	1	2	3	4	Total
Giants	0	3	3	0	**6**
**Commanders**	7	7	0	7	**21**

at Northwest Stadium, Landover, Maryland

- Date: September 7, 2025
- Game time: 1:00 p.m. EDT
- Game weather: Mostly cloudy, 68 °F (20 °C)
- Game attendance: 64,544
- Referee: Clay Martin
- TV announcers (Fox): Kevin Burkhardt, Tom Brady, Erin Andrews, and Tom Rinaldi
- Recap, Game Book

Game information

**First quarter**

- WAS – Zach Ertz 7-yard pass from Jayden Daniels (Matt Gay kick), 7:00. Commanders 7–0. **Drive: 8 plays, 89 yards, 4:02.**

**Second quarter**

- NYG – Graham Gano 21-yard field goal, 13:57. Commanders 7–3. **Drive: 16 plays, 76 yards, 8:03.**
- WAS – Jacory Croskey-Merritt 6-yard run (Matt Gay kick), 6:14. Commanders 14–3. **Drive: 8 plays, 58 yards, 5:26.**

**Third quarter**

- NYG – Graham Gano 55-yard field goal, 1:43. Commanders 14–6. **Drive: 12 plays, 43 yards, 5:21.**

**Fourth quarter**

- WAS – Deebo Samuel 19-yard run (Matt Gay kick), 7:09. Commanders 21–6. **Drive: 9 plays, 80 yards, 4:57.**

**Top passers**

- NYG – Russell Wilson – 17/37, 168 yards
- WAS – Jayden Daniels – 19/30, 266 yards, TD

**Top rushers**

- NYG – Russell Wilson – 8 rushes, 44 yards
- WAS – Jacory Croskey-Merritt – 10 rushes, 82 yards, TD

**Top receivers**

- NYG – Malik Nabers – 5 receptions, 71 yards
- WAS – Deebo Samuel – 7 receptions, 77 yards

For the season opener against the New York Giants, Jayden Daniels, Jeremy Reaves, and Bobby Wagner served as game captains. The win marked the first time the Commanders won three straight over the Giants since 1999–2000. Former wide receiver Santana Moss was inducted into the Commanders Ring of Fame at halftime.

===== Week 2: at Green Bay Packers =====
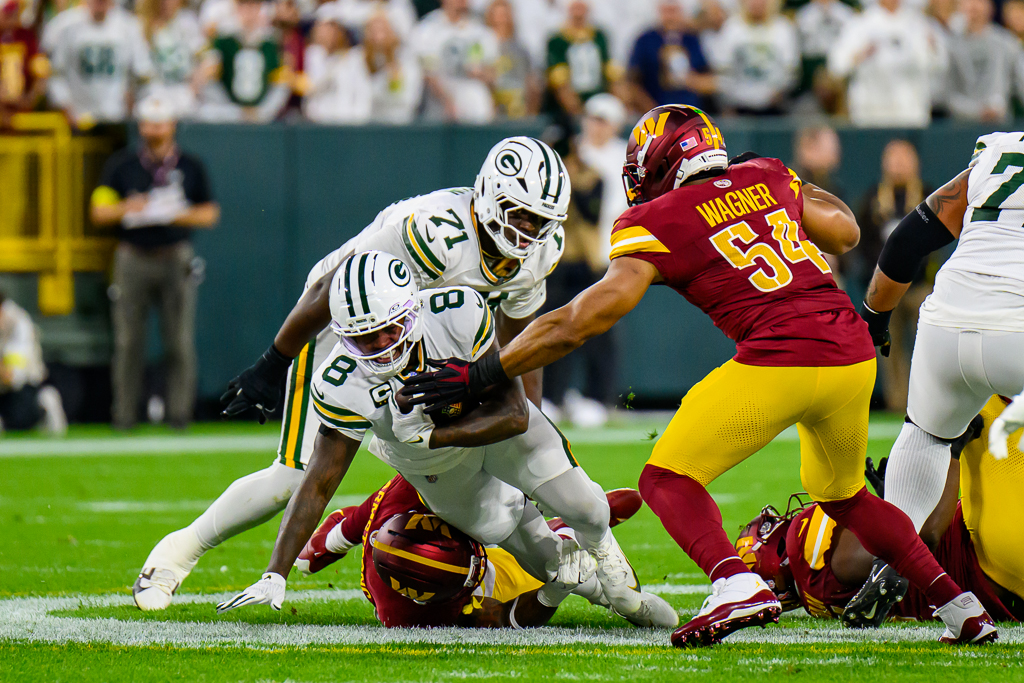
Washington vs. the Green Bay Packers

Week 2: Washington Commanders at Green Bay Packers

Quarter	1	2	3	4	Total
Commanders	0	3	0	15	**18**
**Packers**	7	7	3	10	**27**

at Lambeau Field, Green Bay, Wisconsin

- Date: September 11, 2025
- Game time: 8:15 p.m. EDT/7:15 p.m. CDT
- Game weather: Cloudy, 64 °F (18 °C)
- Game attendance: 77,289
- Referee: Brad Rogers
- TV announcers (WTTG, WGBA, WITI): Al Michaels, Kirk Herbstreit, and Kaylee Hartung
  Game exclusive to WTTG, WGBA, and WITI. Out of market on Prime Video.
- Recap, Game Book

Game information

**First quarter**

- GB – Romeo Doubs 5-yard pass from Jordan Love (Brandon McManus kick), 4:33. Packers 7–0. **Drive: 7 plays, 96 yards, 3:35.**

**Second quarter**

- GB – Josh Jacobs 2-yard run (Brandon McManus kick), 7:34. Packers 14–0. **Drive: 10 plays, 92 yards, 4:50.**
- WAS – Matt Gay 51-yard field goal, 4:27. Packers 14–3. **Drive: 9 plays, 37 yards, 3:07.**

**Third quarter**

- GB – Brandon McManus 22-yard field goal, 6:37. Packers 17–3. **Drive: 10 plays, 54 yards, 5:17.**

**Fourth quarter**

- WAS – Zach Ertz 20-yard pass from Jayden Daniels (Matt Gay kick), 13:45. Packers 17–10. **Drive: 11 plays, 50 yards, 4:46.**
- GB – Tucker Kraft 8-yard pass from Jordan Love (Brandon McManus kick), 8:57. Packers 24–10. **Drive: 9 plays, 65 yards, 4:48.**
- GB – Brandon McManus 56-yard field goal, 6:42. Packers 27–10. **Drive: 4 plays, 2 yards, 1:00.**
- WAS – Deebo Samuel 10-yard pass from Jayden Daniels (Jayden Daniels–Luke McCaffrey pass), 2:53. Packers 27–18. **Drive: 10 plays, 65 yards, 3:49.**

**Top passers**

- WAS – Jayden Daniels – 24/41, 200 yards, 2 TD
- GB – Jordan Love – 19/31, 292 yards, 2 TD

**Top rushers**

- WAS – Austin Ekeler – 8 rushes, 17 yards
- GB – Josh Jacobs – 23 rushes, 84 yards, TD

**Top receivers**

- WAS – Zach Ertz – 6 receptions, 64 yards, TD
- GB – Tucker Kraft – 6 receptions, 124 yards, TD

Nick Bellore, Zach Ertz, and Frankie Luvu served as game captains. The Commanders were down 14–3 at halftime, and 17–3 at the end of the third quarter, but managed to outscore the Packers 15–10 in the 4th quarter. However, this was not enough to seal the win, as the Packers took a knee to run out the clock. Austin Ekeler would be lost for the season with an Achilles injury.

===== Week 3: vs. Las Vegas Raiders =====
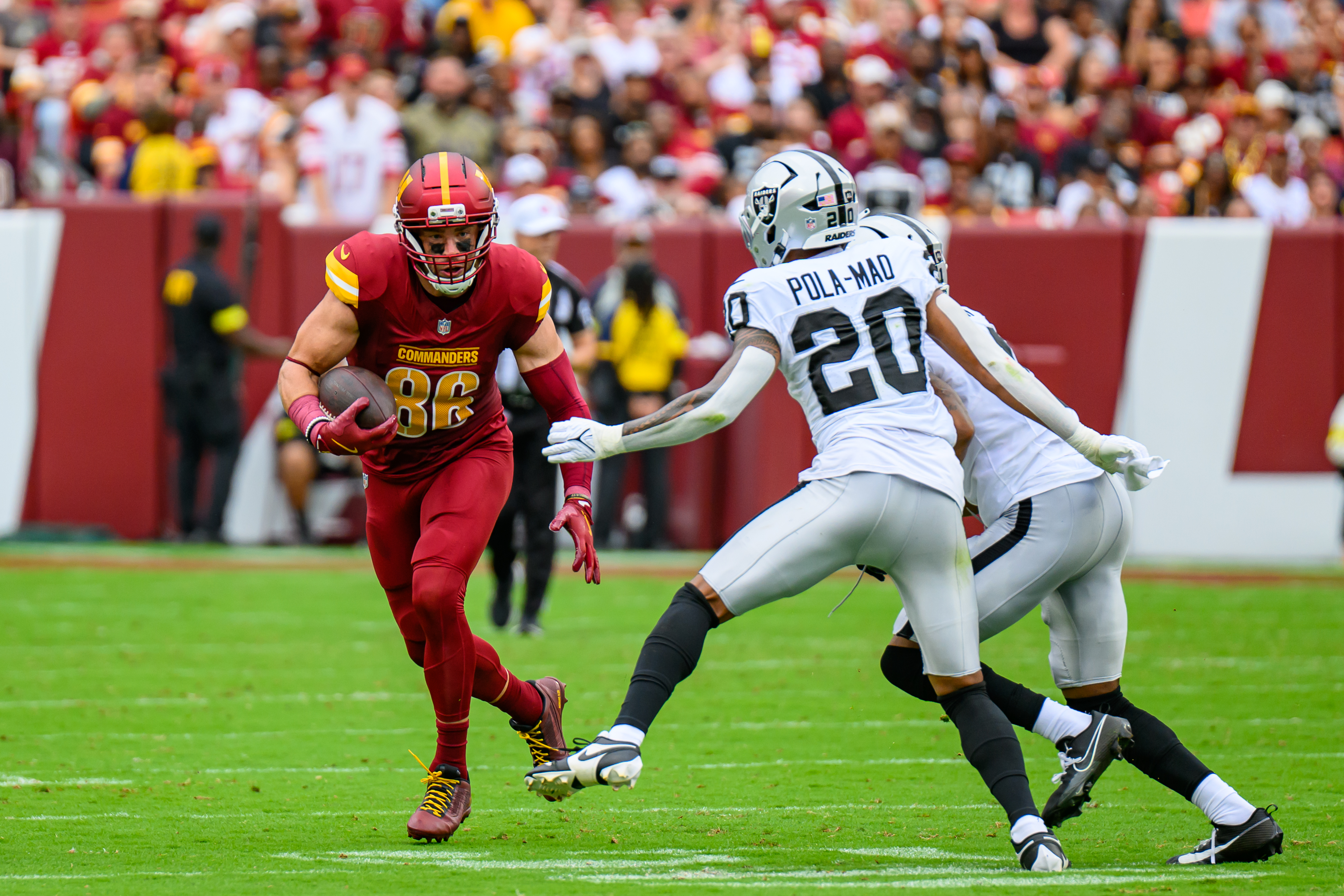
Washington vs. the Las Vegas Raiders

Week 3: Las Vegas Raiders at Washington Commanders

Quarter	1	2	3	4	Total
Raiders	3	7	0	14	**24**
**Commanders**	7	13	14	7	**41**

at Northwest Stadium, Landover, Maryland

- Date: September 21, 2025
- Game time: 1:00 p.m. EDT
- Game weather: Cloudy, 72 °F (22 °C)
- Referee: Shawn Hochuli
- TV announcers (Fox): Chris Myers, Mark Schlereth, and Jen Hale
- Recap, Game Book

Game information

**First quarter**

- WAS – Marcus Mariota 2-yard run (Matt Gay kick), 11:51. Commanders 7–0. **Drive: 5 plays, 27 yards, 3:09.**
- LV – Daniel Carlson 37-yard field goal, 9:46. Commanders 7–3. **Drive: 5 plays, 41 yards, 2:05.**

**Second quarter**

- WAS – Matt Gay 46-yard field goal, 9:56. Commanders 10–3. **Drive: 8 plays, 44 yards, 5:20.**
- LV – Tre Tucker 10-yard pass from Geno Smith (Daniel Carlson kick), 4:20. Tied 10–10. **Drive: 9 plays, 80 yards, 5:36.**
- WAS – Jeremy McNichols 60-yard run (Matt Gay kick), 3:31. Commanders 17–10. **Drive: 2 plays, 65 yards, 0:49.**
- WAS – Matt Gay 56-yard field goal, 0:00. Commanders 20–10. **Drive: 4 plays, 28 yards, 0:27.**

**Third quarter**

- WAS – Jaylin Lane 90-yard punt return (Matt Gay kick), 9:35. Commanders 27–10.
- WAS – Jacory Croskey-Merritt 1-yard run (Matt Gay kick), 3:03. Commanders 34–10. **Drive: 5 plays, 63 yards, 2:20.**

**Fourth quarter**

- LV – Tre Tucker 10-yard pass from Geno Smith (run failed), 12:57. Commanders 34–16. **Drive: 11 plays, 70 yards, 5:06.**
- LV – Tre Tucker 61-yard pass from Geno Smith (Geno Smith–Brock Bowers pass), 3:42. Commanders 34–24. **Drive: 3 plays, 83 yards, 0:38.**
- WAS – Luke McCaffrey 43-yard pass from Marcus Mariota (Matt Gay kick), 2:05. Commanders 41–24. **Drive: 3 plays, 46 yards, 1:37.**

**Top passers**

- LV – Geno Smith – 19/29, 289 yards, 3 TD
- WAS – Marcus Mariota – 15/21, 207 yards, TD

**Top rushers**

- LV – Ashton Jeanty – 17 rushes, 63 yards
- WAS – Jeremy McNichols – 4 rushes, 78 yards, TD

**Top receivers**

- LV – Tre Tucker – 8 receptions, 145 yards, 3 TD
- WAS – Terry McLaurin – 3 receptions, 74 yards

Percy Butler, Daron Payne, and Laremy Tunsil served as game captains. Wide receiver Jaylin Lane tied a Commanders' record when he returned a 90-yard punt return for a touchdown.

===== Week 4: at Atlanta Falcons =====
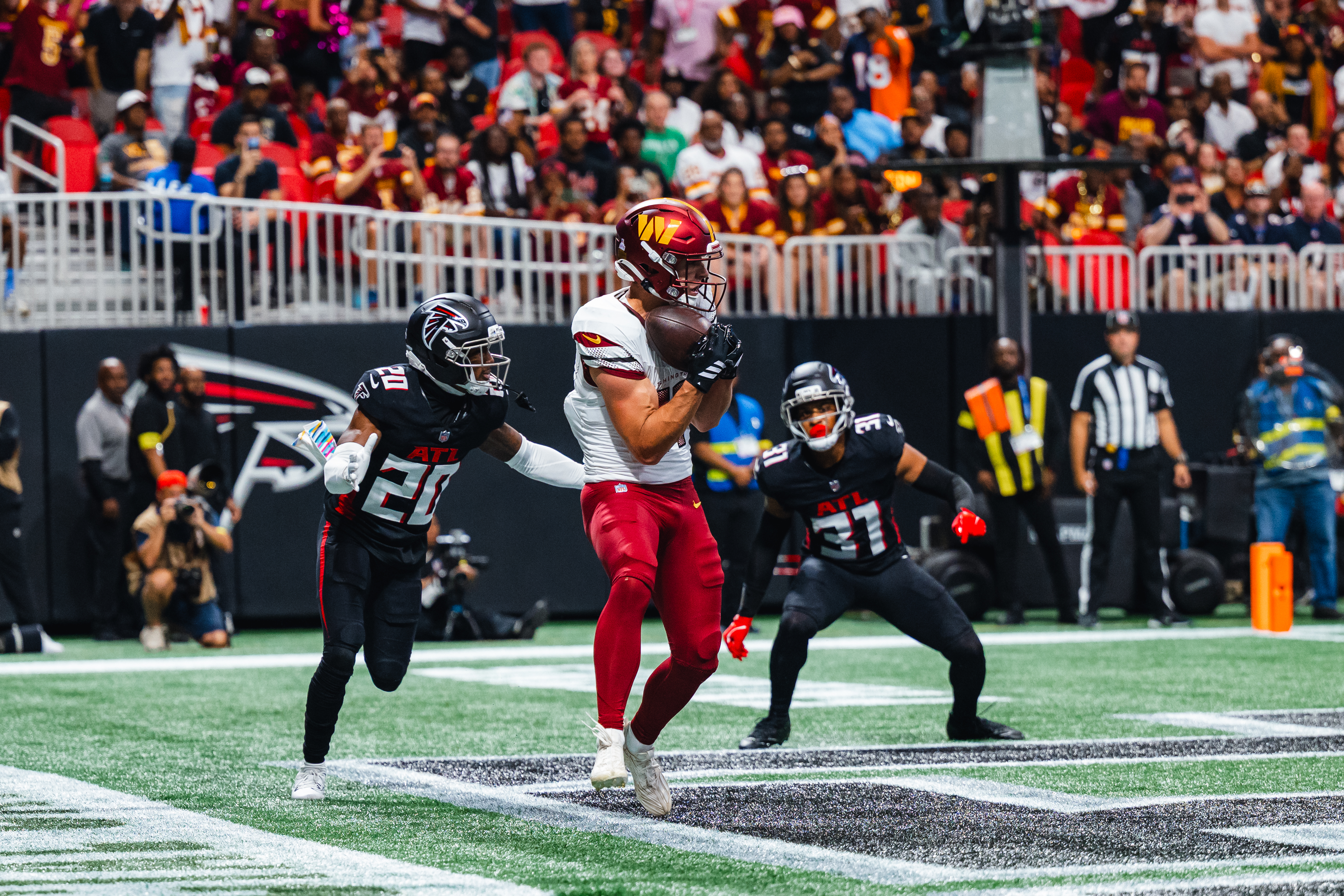
Washington vs. the Atlanta Falcons

Week 4: Washington Commanders at Atlanta Falcons

Quarter	1	2	3	4	Total
Commanders	0	10	6	11	**27**
**Falcons**	10	7	14	3	**34**

at Mercedes-Benz Stadium, Atlanta, Georgia

- Date: September 28, 2025
- Game time: 1:00 p.m. EDT
- Game weather: None (retractable roof closed)
- Game attendance: 71,492
- Referee: Scott Novak
- TV announcers (CBS): Ian Eagle, J. J. Watt, and Evan Washburn
- Recap, Game Book

Game information

**First quarter**

- ATL – Parker Romo 38-yard field goal, 10:46. Falcons 3–0. **Drive: 9 plays, 45 yards, 4:14.**
- ATL – Drake London 5-yard pass from Michael Penix Jr. (Parker Romo kick), 0:49. Falcons 10–0. **Drive: 14 plays, 73 yards, 8:13.**

**Second quarter**

- WAS – Luke McCaffrey 5-yard pass from Marcus Mariota (Matt Gay kick), 11:31. Falcons 10–7. **Drive: 8 plays, 70 yards, 4:18.**
- ATL – Bijan Robinson 14-yard run (Parker Romo kick), 8:27. Falcons 17–7. **Drive: 5 plays, 63 yards, 3:04.**
- WAS – Matt Gay 43-yard field goal, 5:24. Falcons 17–10. **Drive: 6 plays, 16 yards, 3:03.**

**Third quarter**

- WAS – Matt Gay 52-yard field goal, 10:12. Falcons 17–13. **Drive: 8 plays, 37 yards, 4:48.**
- ATL – Kyle Pitts 7-yard pass from Michael Penix Jr. (Parker Romo kick), 9:25. Falcons 24–13. **Drive: 2 plays, 76 yards, 0:47.**
- WAS – Matt Gay 41-yard field goal, 4:22. Falcons 24–16. **Drive: 4 plays, 2 yards, 0:51.**
- ATL – Tyler Allgeier 15-yard run (Parker Romo kick), 0:14. Falcons 31–16. **Drive: 7 plays, 72 yards, 4:08.**

**Fourth quarter**

- WAS – Deebo Samuel 24-yard pass from Marcus Mariota (Marcus Mariota–Zach Ertz pass), 8:48. Falcons 31–24. **Drive: 11 plays, 76 yards, 6:26.**
- ATL – Parker Romo 26-yard field goal, 1:57. Falcons 34–24. **Drive: 14 plays, 69 yards, 6:51.**
- WAS – Matt Gay 42-yard field goal, 1:29. Falcons 34–27. **Drive: 4 plays, 41 yards, 0:28.**

**Top passers**

- WAS – Marcus Mariota – 16/27, 156 yards, 2 TD, INT
- ATL – Michael Penix Jr. – 20/26, 313 yards, 2 TD, INT

**Top rushers**

- WAS – Chris Rodriguez Jr. – 7 rushes, 59 yards
- ATL – Bijan Robinson – 17 rushes, 75 yards, TD

**Top receivers**

- WAS – Deebo Samuel – 6 receptions, 72 yards, TD
- ATL – Drake London – 8 receptions, 110 yards, TD

Marcus Mariota, Quan Martin, and Tress Way served as game captains. The Commanders had an extremely disappointing game against the Michael Penix Jr.–led Atlanta Falcons, as they were upset with a loss of 34–27. With their first loss to Atlanta since 2018, the Commanders fell to 2–2.

===== Week 5: at Los Angeles Chargers =====
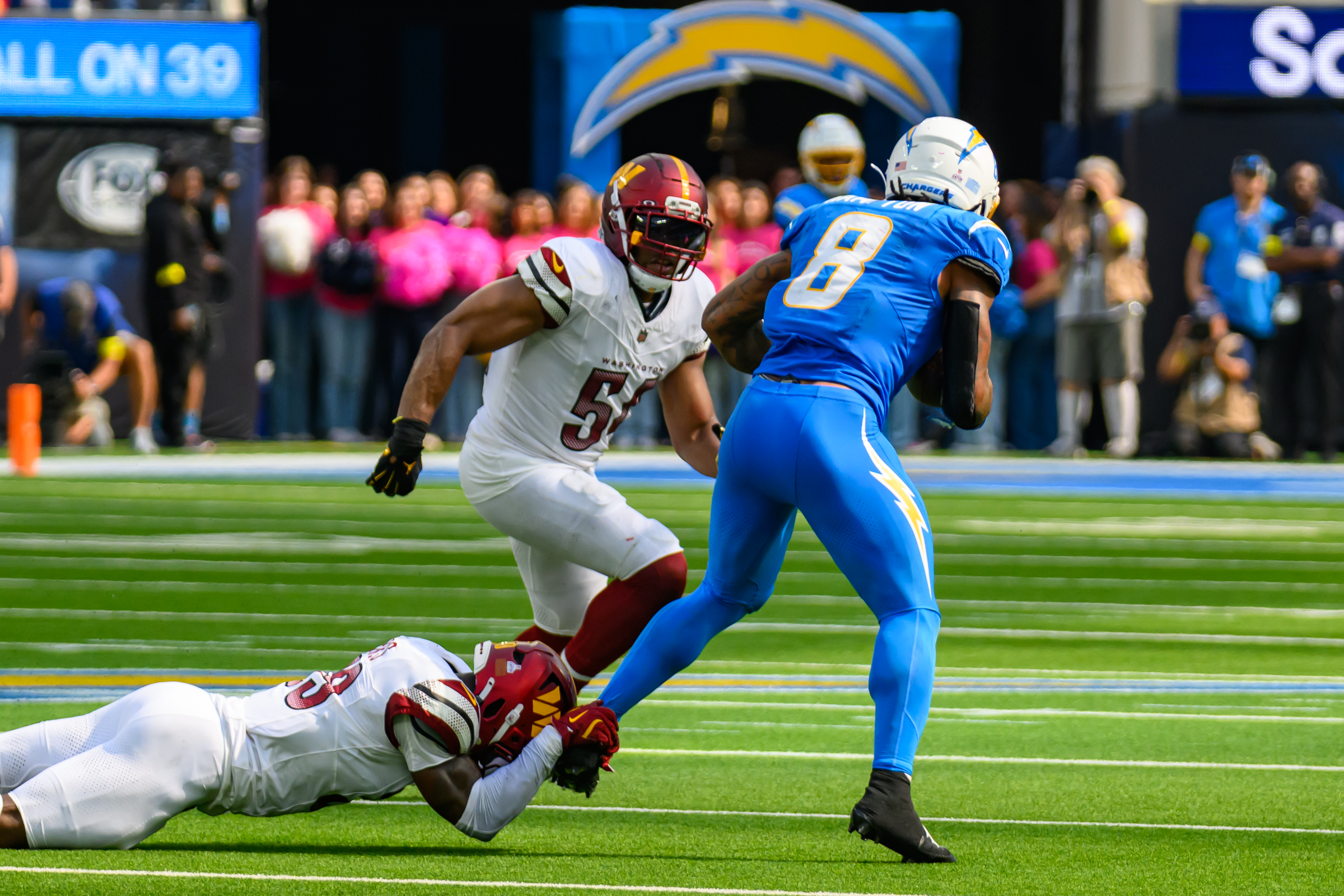
Washington vs. the Los Angeles Chargers

Week 5: Washington Commanders at Los Angeles Chargers

Quarter	1	2	3	4	Total
**Commanders**	0	10	10	7	**27**
Chargers	10	0	0	0	**10**

at SoFi Stadium, Inglewood, California

- Date: October 5, 2025
- Game time: 4:25 p.m. EDT / 1:25 p.m. PDT
- Game weather: Sunny, 77 °F (25 °C) (fixed roof)
- Game attendance: 71,021
- Referee: John Hussey
- TV announcers (Fox): Kevin Burkhardt, Tom Brady, Erin Andrews, and Tom Rinaldi
- Recap, Game Book

Game information

**First quarter**

- LAC – Ladd McConkey 2-yard pass from Justin Herbert (Cameron Dicker kick), 9:49. Chargers 7–0. **Drive: 9 plays, 76 yards, 5:11.**
- LAC – Cameron Dicker 55-yard field goal, 2:57. Chargers 10–0. **Drive: 9 plays, 43 yards, 5:24.**

**Second quarter**

- WAS – Jacory Croskey-Merritt 15-yard run (Matt Gay kick), 4:15. Chargers 10–7. **Drive: 9 plays, 74 yards, 4:35.**
- WAS – Matt Gay 29-yard field goal, 0:02. Tied 10–10. **Drive: 8 plays, 82 yards, 1:33.**

**Third quarter**

- WAS – Jacory Croskey-Merritt 5-yard run (Matt Gay kick), 10:58. Commanders 17–10. **Drive: 7 plays, 69 yards, 4:02.**
- WAS – Matt Gay 36-yard field goal, 5:49. Commanders 20–10. **Drive: 8 plays, 39 yards, 2:35.**

**Fourth quarter**

- WAS – Deebo Samuel 8-yard pass from Jayden Daniels (Matt Gay kick), 1:08. Commanders 27–10. **Drive: 13 plays, 99 yards, 6:32.**

**Top passers**

- WAS – Jayden Daniels – 15/26, 231 yards, TD
- LAC – Justin Herbert – 22/29, 166 yards, TD, INT

**Top rushers**

- WAS – Jacory Croskey-Merritt – 14 rushes, 111 yards, 2 TD
- LAC – Justin Herbert – 4 rushes, 60 yards

**Top receivers**

- WAS – Deebo Samuel – 8 receptions, 96 yards, TD
- LAC – Keenan Allen – 5 receptions, 58 yards

Javon Kinlaw, Jeremy McNichols, and Deebo Samuel served as game captains.

After allowing the Chargers to score the first 10 points, the Commanders shut them out for the remainder of the game and scored 27 unanswered points en route to a 27–10 victory. With the win, the Commanders improved to 3–2 and recorded their first road victory against the Chargers since the 1986 season, when the team was known as the San Diego Chargers.

Quarterback Jayden Daniels became the first quarterback in NFL history to rush for over 1,000 yards within his first 20 career games.

===== Week 6: vs. Chicago Bears =====
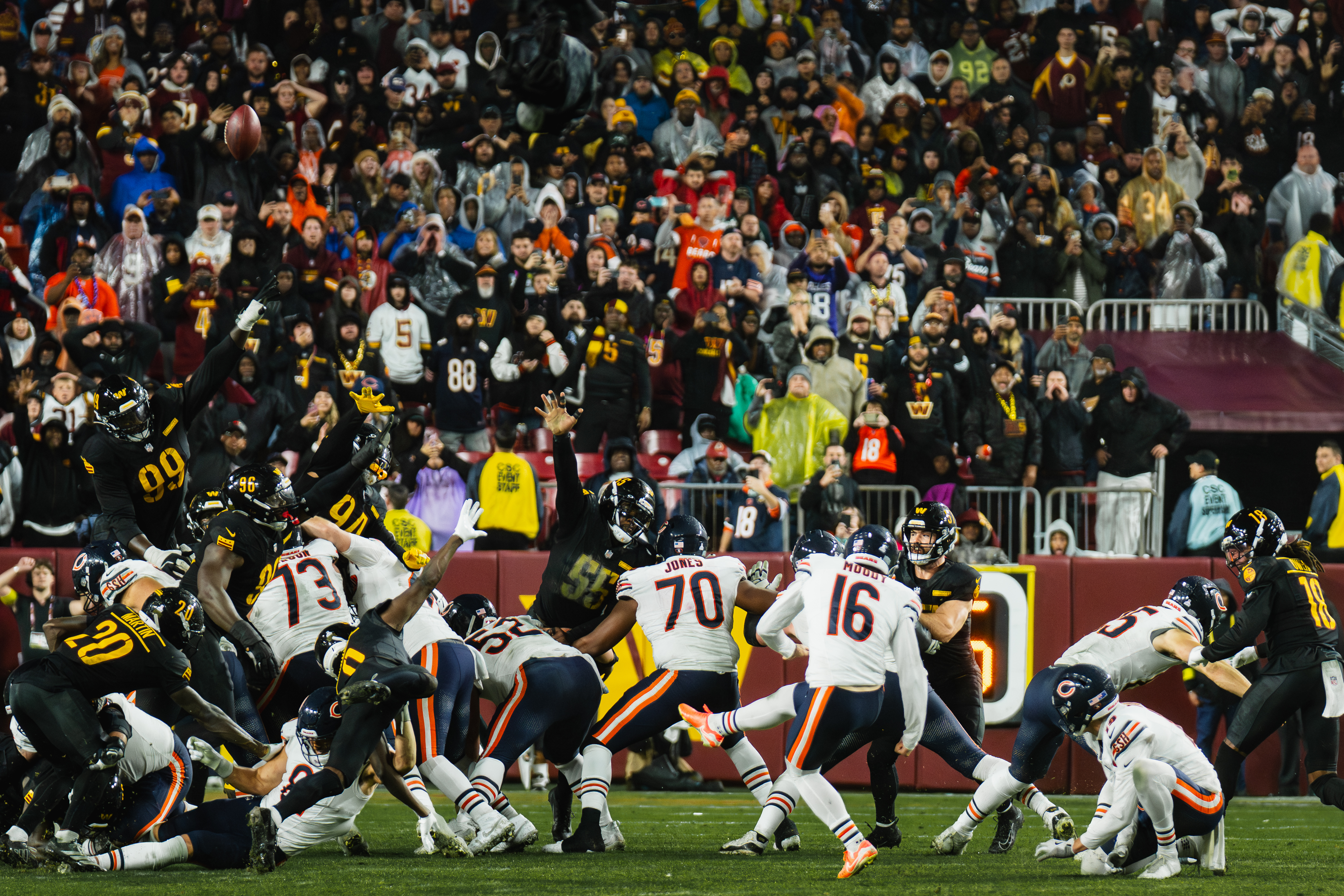
Washington vs. the Chicago Bears

Week 6: Chicago Bears at Washington Commanders

Quarter	1	2	3	4	Total
**Bears**	6	7	3	9	**25**
Commanders	0	7	10	7	**24**

at Northwest Stadium, Landover, Maryland

- Date: October 13, 2025
- Game time: 8:15 p.m. EDT
- Game weather: Cloudy, 59 °F (15 °C)
- Game attendance: 64,457
- Referee: Alex Moore
- TV announcers (ABC): Joe Buck, Troy Aikman, Lisa Salters, and Laura Rutledge
- Recap, Game Book

Game information

**First quarter**

- CHI – Jake Moody 47-yard field goal, 10:41. Bears 3–0. **Drive: 9 plays, 41 yards, 4:19.**
- CHI – Jake Moody 48-yard field goal, 2:27. Bears 6–0. **Drive: 8 plays, 36 yards, 3:39.**

**Second quarter**

- CHI – Caleb Williams 1-yard run (Jake Moody kick), 14:18. Bears 13–0. **Drive: 5 plays, 35 yards, 2:41.**
- WAS – Chris Moore 22-yard pass from Jayden Daniels (Matt Gay kick), 9:28. Bears 13–7. **Drive: 8 plays, 65 yards, 4:50.**

**Third quarter**

- WAS – Matt Gay 53-yard field goal, 11:59. Bears 13–10. **Drive: 8 plays, 25 yards, 3:01.**
- CHI – Jake Moody 41-yard field goal, 8:05. Bears 16–10. **Drive: 8 plays, 62 yards, 3:54.**
- WAS – Luke McCaffrey 33-yard pass from Jayden Daniels (Matt Gay kick), 2:56. Commanders 17–16. **Drive: 9 plays, 84 yards, 5:09.**

**Fourth quarter**

- WAS – Zach Ertz 6-yard pass from Jayden Daniels (Matt Gay kick), 11:27. Commanders 24–16. **Drive: 6 plays, 63 yards, 3:28.**
- CHI – D'Andre Swift 55-yard pass from Caleb Williams (pass failed), 10:26. Commanders 24–22. **Drive: 3 plays, 61 yards, 1:01.**
- CHI – Jake Moody 38-yard field goal, 0:00. Bears 25–24. **Drive: 9 plays, 36 yards, 3:07.**

**Top passers**

- CHI – Caleb Williams – 17/29, 252 yards, TD
- WAS – Jayden Daniels – 19/26, 211 yards, 3 TD, INT

**Top rushers**

- CHI – D'Andre Swift – 14 rushes, 108 yards
- WAS – Jacory Croskey-Merritt – 17 rushes, 61 yards

**Top receivers**

- CHI – D'Andre Swift – 2 receptions, 67 yards, TD
- WAS – Chris Moore – 3 receptions, 46 yards, TD

In a rematch of last season’s thrilling game, which ended with a walk-off Hail Mary by Washington, it was the Bears who delivered the final blow this time, upsetting Washington 25–24. The Bears controlled much of the first half, but the game tightened in the third quarter as both teams traded scores to change the lead. With just under three minutes remaining in the fourth quarter, Washington held a 24–22 lead until a botched handoff between quarterback Daniels and Jeremy McNichols resulted in a fumble and turnover. The Bears capitalized on the mistake, and kicker Jake Moody sealed the win with a walk-off field goal on the ensuing drive. With the loss, Washington fell to 3–3.

Dorance Armstrong, John Bates, and Mike Sainristil served as game captains.

===== Week 7: at Dallas Cowboys =====
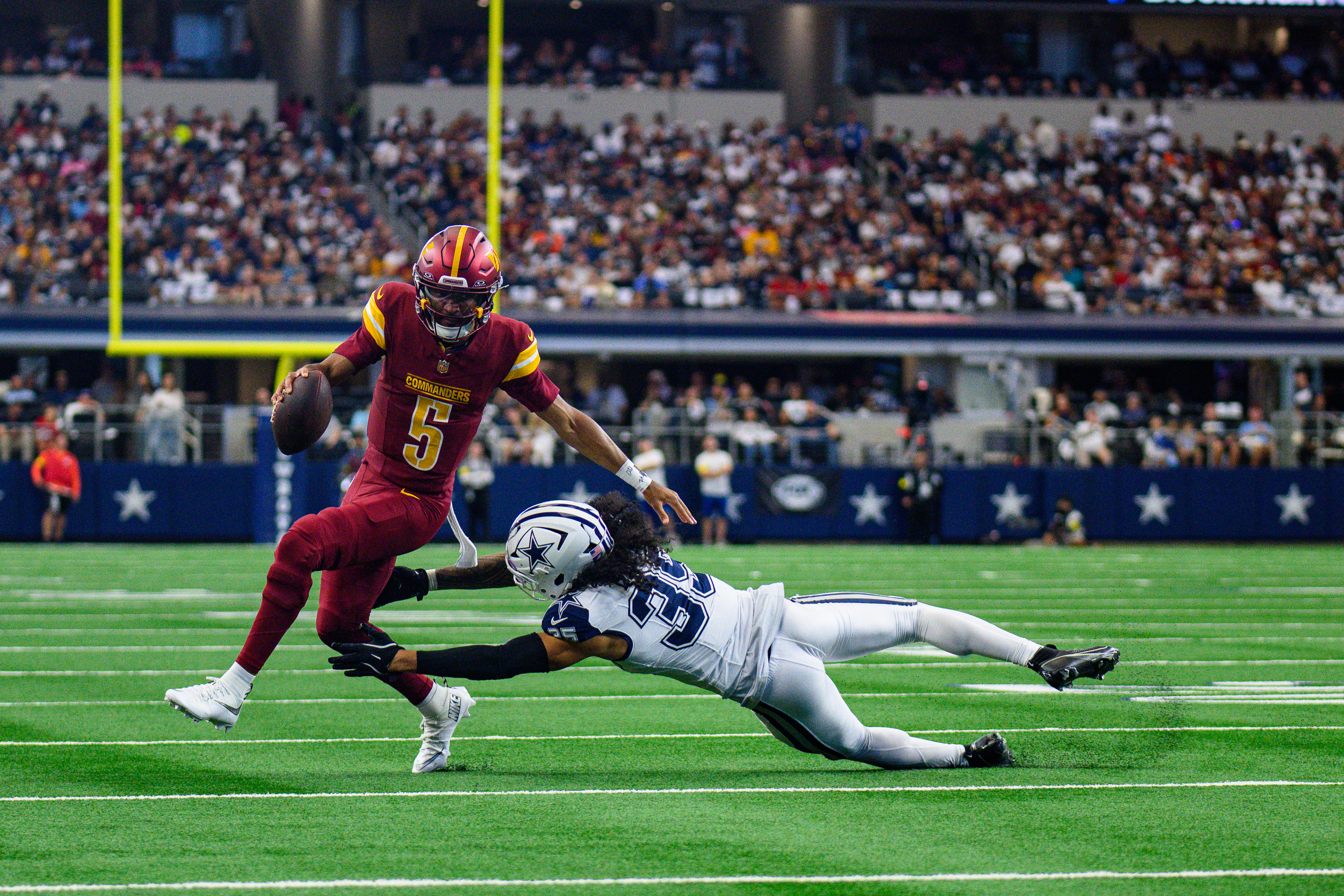
Washington vs. the Dallas Cowboys

Week 7: Washington Commanders at Dallas Cowboys

Quarter	1	2	3	4	Total
Commanders	8	7	7	0	**22**
**Cowboys**	17	10	14	3	**44**

at AT&T Stadium, Arlington, Texas

- Date: October 19, 2025
- Game time: 4:25 p.m. EDT/3:25 p.m. CDT
- Game weather: None (retractable roof closed)
- Game attendance: 93,051
- Referee: Alex Kemp
- TV announcers (Fox): Kevin Burkhardt, Tom Brady, Erin Andrews and Tom Rinaldi
- Recap, Game Book

Game information

**First quarter**

- DAL – Javonte Williams 2-yard run (Brandon Aubrey kick), 13:05. Cowboys 7–0. **Drive: 5 plays, 66 yards, 1:55.**
- WAS – Daron Payne safety, 11:23. Cowboys 7–2.
- WAS – Zach Ertz 5-yard pass from Jayden Daniels (run failed), 7:38. Commanders 8–7. **Drive: 7 plays, 65 yards, 3:45.**
- DAL – Brandon Aubrey 47-yard field goal, 6:14. Cowboys 10–8. **Drive: 5 plays, 31 yards, 1:24.**
- DAL – CeeDee Lamb 74-yard pass from Dak Prescott (Brandon Aubrey kick), 4:27. Cowboys 17–8. **Drive: 1 play, 74 yards, 0:11.**

**Second quarter**

- DAL – Brandon Aubrey 61-yard field goal, 7:22. Cowboys 20–8. **Drive: 8 plays, 11 yards, 3:34.**
- WAS – Jayden Daniels 1-yard run (Matt Gay kick), 0:45. Cowboys 20–15. **Drive: 7 plays, 68 yards, 1:11.**
- DAL – Jake Ferguson 2-yard pass from Dak Prescott (Brandon Aubrey kick), 0:10. Cowboys 27–15. **Drive: 4 plays, 72 yards, 0:35.**

**Third quarter**

- DAL – Jake Ferguson 5-yard pass from Dak Prescott (Brandon Aubrey kick), 7:44. Cowboys 34–15. **Drive: 9 plays, 55 yards, 4:03.**
- DAL – DaRon Bland 68-yard interception return (Brandon Aubrey kick), 5:31. Cowboys 41–15.
- WAS – Chris Rodriguez Jr. 3-yard run (Matt Gay kick), 2:35. Cowboys 41–22. **Drive: 7 plays, 53 yards, 2:56.**

**Fourth quarter**

- DAL – Brandon Aubrey 29-yard field goal, 12:45. Cowboys 44–22. **Drive: 9 plays, 56 yards, 4:50.**

**Top passers**

- WAS – Jayden Daniels – 12/22, 156 yards, TD
- DAL – Dak Prescott – 21/30, 264 yards, 3 TD

**Top rushers**

- WAS – Jayden Daniels – 8 rushes, 35 yards, TD
- DAL – Javonte Williams – 19 rushes, 116 yards, TD

**Top receivers**

- WAS – Jaylin Lane – 3 receptions, 60 yards
- DAL – CeeDee Lamb – 5 receptions, 110 yards, TD

Chris Paul, Tyler Owens, and Von Miller served as game captains. The Commanders had an extremely disappointing game against the Dak Prescott–led Dallas Cowboys, as they were upset with a blowout loss of 44–22. With the loss, the Commanders fell to 3–4.

===== Week 8: at Kansas City Chiefs =====
Week 8: Washington Commanders at Kansas City Chiefs

Quarter	1	2	3	4	Total
Commanders	0	7	0	0	**7**
**Chiefs**	0	7	14	7	**28**

at Arrowhead Stadium, Kansas City, Missouri

- Date: October 27, 2025
- Game time: 8:15 p.m. EDT/7:15 p.m. CDT
- Game weather: Cloudy, 54 °F (12 °C)
- Game attendance: 73,569
- Referee: Brad Allen
- TV announcers (ABC): Joe Buck, Troy Aikman, Lisa Salters, and Laura Rutledge
- Recap, Game Book

Game information

**First quarter**

- No scoring plays

**Second quarter**

- KC – Kareem Hunt 1-yard run (Harrison Butker kick), 5:46. Chiefs 7–0. **Drive: 9 plays, 72 yards, 4:39.**
- WAS – Terry McLaurin 11-yard pass from Marcus Mariota (Matthew Wright kick), 0:58. Tied 7–7. **Drive: 10 plays, 66 yards, 4:48.**

**Third quarter**

- KC – Kareem Hunt 2-yard pass from Patrick Mahomes (Harrison Butker kick), 10:12. Chiefs 14–7. **Drive: 8 plays, 80 yards, 4:48.**
- KC – Travis Kelce 10-yard pass from Patrick Mahomes (Harrison Butker kick), 3:20. Chiefs 21–7. **Drive: 8 plays, 75 yards, 4:45.**

**Fourth quarter**

- KC – Rashee Rice 18-yard pass from Patrick Mahomes (Harrison Butker kick), 7:52. Chiefs 28–7. **Drive: 13 plays, 94 yards, 7:02.**

**Top passers**

- WAS – Marcus Mariota – 21/30, 213 yards, TD, 2 INT
- KC – Patrick Mahomes – 25/34, 299 yards, 3 TD, 2 INT

**Top rushers**

- WAS – Marcus Mariota – 8 rushes, 28 yards
- KC – Isiah Pacheco – 12 rushes, 58 yards

**Top receivers**

- WAS – Jeremy McNichols – 5 receptions, 64 yards
- KC – Travis Kelce – 6 receptions, 99 yards, TD

Javon Kinlaw, Jacob Martin, and Luke McCaffrey served as game captains. With their ninth straight loss to Kansas City since 1983, the Commanders fell to 3–5.

===== Week 9: vs. Seattle Seahawks =====
Week 9: Seattle Seahawks at Washington Commanders

Quarter	1	2	3	4	Total
**Seahawks**	7	24	7	0	**38**
Commanders	0	7	0	7	**14**

at Northwest Stadium, Landover, Maryland

- Date: November 2, 2025
- Game time: 8:20 p.m. EST
- Game weather: Mostly clear, 52 °F (11 °C)
- Game attendance: 64,197
- Referee: Bill Vinovich
- TV announcers (NBC): Mike Tirico, Cris Collinsworth, and Melissa Stark
- Recap, Game Book

Game information

**First quarter**

- SEA – Tory Horton 4-yard pass from Sam Darnold (Jason Myers kick), 3:04. Seahawks 7–0. **Drive: 12 plays, 90 yards, 8:07.**

**Second quarter**

- SEA – Tory Horton 25-yard pass from Sam Darnold (Jason Myers kick), 8:52. Seahawks 14–0. **Drive: 7 plays, 60 yards, 3:57.**
- SEA – Elijah Arroyo 26-yard pass from Sam Darnold (Jason Myers kick), 8:41. Seahawks 21–0. **Drive: 1 play, 26 yards, 0:05.**
- SEA – Cody White 60-yard pass from Sam Darnold (Jason Myers kick), 4:34. Seahawks 28–0. **Drive: 4 plays, 87 yards, 2:10.**
- WAS – Jayden Daniels 1-yard run (Matt Gay kick), 0:53. Seahawks 28–7. **Drive: 10 plays, 69 yards, 3:41.**
- SEA – Jason Myers 41-yard field goal, 0:00. Seahawks 31–7. **Drive: 4 plays, 53 yards, 0:53.**

**Third quarter**

- SEA – AJ Barner 1-yard run (Jason Myers kick), 1:53. Seahawks 38–7. **Drive: 9 plays, 60 yards, 3:48.**

**Fourth quarter**

- WAS – Chris Rodriguez Jr. 4-yard run (Matt Gay kick), 7:14. Seahawks 38–14. **Drive: 11 plays, 65 yards, 5:16.**

**Top passers**

- SEA – Sam Darnold – 21/24, 330 yards, 4 TD, INT
- WAS – Jayden Daniels – 16/22, 153 yards, INT

**Top rushers**

- SEA – Kenneth Walker III – 11 rushes, 42 yards
- WAS – Chris Rodriguez Jr. – 12 rushes, 65 yards, TD

**Top receivers**

- SEA – Jaxon Smith-Njigba – 8 receptions, 129 yards
- WAS – Zach Ertz – 4 receptions, 46 yards

Percy Butler, Zach Ertz, and Marshon Lattimore served as game captains.

During the fourth quarter of the game, Jayden Daniels sustained a dislocated left elbow, an injury that was later announced would sideline him for the next three games.

===== Week 10: vs. Detroit Lions =====
Week 10: Detroit Lions at Washington Commanders

Quarter	1	2	3	4	Total
**Lions**	14	11	10	9	**44**
Commanders	3	7	6	6	**22**

at Northwest Stadium, Landover, Maryland

- Date: November 9, 2025
- Game time: 4:25 p.m. EST
- Game weather: Mostly cloudy, 65 °F (18 °C)
- Game attendance: 64,470
- Referee: Scott Novak
- TV announcers (Fox): Kenny Albert, Jonathan Vilma, and Megan Olivi
- Recap, Game Book

Game information

**First quarter**

- DET – Jahmyr Gibbs 14-yard pass from Jared Goff (Jake Bates kick), 8:24. Lions 7–0. **Drive: 10 plays, 78 yards, 5:04.**
- WAS – Matt Gay 44-yard field goal, 5:43. Lions 7–3. **Drive: 7 plays, 26 yards, 2:41.**
- DET – Amon-Ra St. Brown 9-yard pass from Jared Goff (Jake Bates kick), 1:54. Lions 14–3. **Drive: 9 plays, 65 yards, 3:49.**

**Second quarter**

- DET – Jahmyr Gibbs 13-yard run (David Montgomery run), 9:41. Lions 22–3. **Drive: 9 plays, 87 yards, 5:11.**
- WAS – Chris Rodriguez Jr. 1-yard run (Matt Gay kick), 3:39. Lions 22–10. **Drive: 10 plays, 75 yards, 6:02.**
- DET – Jake Bates 22-yard field goal, 0:11. Lions 25–10. **Drive: 13 plays, 64 yards, 3:28.**

**Third quarter**

- DET – Jameson Williams 14-yard pass from Jared Goff (Jake Bates kick), 12:06. Lions 32–10. **Drive: 5 plays, 72 yards, 2:54.**
- WAS – Deebo Samuel 4-yard pass from Marcus Mariota (pass failed), 7:05. Lions 32–16. **Drive: 9 plays, 69 yards, 5:01.**
- DET – Jake Bates 28-yard field goal, 2:30. Lions 35–16. **Drive: 9 plays, 72 yards, 4:35.**

**Fourth quarter**

- DET – Jahmyr Gibbs 43-yard run (kick blocked), 12:50. Lions 41–16. **Drive: 6 plays, 84 yards, 3:03.**
- WAS – Ben Sinnott 4-yard pass from Marcus Mariota (run failed), 6:57. Lions 41–22. **Drive: 11 plays, 81 yards, 5:53.**
- DET – Jake Bates 48-yard field goal, 4:34. Lions 44–22. **Drive: 6 plays, 15 yards, 2:23.**

**Top passers**

- DET – Jared Goff – 25/33, 320 yards, 3 TD
- WAS – Marcus Mariota – 16/22, 213 yards, 2 TD

**Top rushers**

- DET – Jahmyr Gibbs – 15 rushes, 142 yards, 2 TD
- WAS – Jacory Croskey-Merritt – 11 rushes, 30 yards

**Top receivers**

- DET – Jameson Williams – 6 receptions, 119 yards, TD
- WAS – Treylon Burks – 3 receptions, 58 yards

Daron Payne, Jeremy Reaves, and Chris Rodriguez Jr. served as game captains.

Donald Trump was in attendance for this game, becoming the first sitting U.S. president to attend an NFL game since Jimmy Carter in October 1978, leading to extra security measures enacted and Air Force One flying over the stadium in the first quarter. Trump also spoke from the broadcast booth with Kenny Albert and Jonathan Vilma during the third quarter, including providing reactionary commentary on Deebo Samuel’s touchdown. Trump was booed by Commanders fans when he appeared on the jumbotron at halftime.

With the blowout loss, Washington fell to 3–7 for the first time since 2020.

===== Week 11: at Miami Dolphins =====
Week 11: Washington Commanders at Miami Dolphins

Quarter	1	2	3	4	OT	Total
Commanders	3	3	7	0	0	**13**
**Dolphins**	3	3	0	7	3	**16**

at Santiago Bernabéu Stadium, Madrid, Spain

- Date: November 16, 2025
- Game time: 9:30 a.m. EST
- Game weather: None (retractable roof closed)
- Game attendance: 78,610
- Referee: Shawn Smith
- TV announcers (WUSA/NFL Network): Kenny Albert, Jonathan Vilma, and Jamie Erdahl
- Recap, Game Book

Game information

**First quarter**

- MIA – Riley Patterson 46-yard field goal, 10:35. Dolphins 3–0. **Drive: 7 plays, 52 yards, 4:25.**
- WAS – Matt Gay 26-yard field goal, 2:36. Tied 3–3. **Drive: 13 plays, 71 yards, 7:59.**

**Second quarter**

- MIA – Riley Patterson 39-yard field goal, 11:27. Dolphins 6–3. **Drive: 11 plays, 56 yards, 6:09.**
- WAS – Matt Gay 30-yard field goal, 0:00. Tied 6–6. **Drive: 14 plays, 82 yards, 5:37.**

**Third quarter**

- WAS – Deebo Samuel 20-yard pass from Marcus Mariota (Matt Gay kick), 11:24. Commanders 13–6. **Drive: 6 plays, 59 yards, 3:36.**

**Fourth quarter**

- MIA – Ollie Gordon II 1-yard run (Riley Patterson kick), 12:36. Tied 13–13. **Drive: 10 plays, 53 yards, 5:13.**

**Overtime**

- MIA – Riley Patterson 29-yard field goal, 7:33. Dolphins 16–13. **Drive: 4 plays, 22 yards, 2:20.**

**Top passers**

- WAS – Marcus Mariota – 20/30, 213 yards, TD, INT
- MIA – Tua Tagovailoa – 14/20, 171 yards

**Top rushers**

- WAS – Chris Rodriguez Jr. – 15 rushes, 79 yards
- MIA – De'Von Achane – 21 rushes, 120 yards

**Top receivers**

- WAS – Deebo Samuel – 7 receptions, 74 yards, TD
- MIA – Jaylen Waddle – 3 receptions, 52 yards

The Commanders and the Dolphins played in Madrid in the first NFL regular-season game held in Spain as part of the NFL International Series.

On the first play of overtime, backup quarterback Marcus Mariota threw an interception to Dolphins cornerback Jack Jones, which set up a game-winning 29-yard field goal by Dolphins kicker Riley Patterson.

The Commanders had an extremely disappointing game against the Tua Tagovailoa-led Dolphins, as they were upset with an overtime loss of 16–13. With their second loss to Miami since 2023, the Commanders fell to 3–8 and extended their losing streak to six games.

Following the game, the Commanders released kicker Matt Gay, who missed two of his four field-goal attempts, including one with 15 seconds remaining in regulation that would have won the game for Washington.

===== Week 13: vs. Denver Broncos =====
Week 13: Denver Broncos at Washington Commanders

Quarter	1	2	3	4	OT	Total
**Broncos**	3	10	7	0	7	**27**
Commanders	0	7	7	6	6	**26**

at Northwest Stadium, Landover, Maryland

- Date: November 30, 2025
- Game time: 8:20 p.m. EST
- Game weather: Clear, 40 °F (4 °C)
- Game attendance: 63,159
- Referee: Land Clark
- TV announcers (NBC): Mike Tirico, Cris Collinsworth, and Melissa Stark
- Recap, Game Book

Game information

**First quarter**

- DEN – Wil Lutz 33-yard field goal, 10:28. Broncos 3–0. **Drive: 11 plays, 59 yards, 4:32.**

**Second quarter**

- DEN – Wil Lutz 33-yard field goal, 7:51. Broncos 6–0. **Drive: 13 plays, 56 yards, 6:30.**
- WAS – Chris Rodriguez Jr. 8-yard run (Jake Moody kick), 2:21. Commanders 7–6. **Drive: 11 plays, 71 yards, 5:30.**
- DEN – Courtland Sutton 11-yard pass from Bo Nix (Wil Lutz kick), 0:23. Broncos 13–7. **Drive: 10 plays, 64 yards, 1:58.**

**Third quarter**

- WAS – Treylon Burks 5-yard pass from Marcus Mariota (Jake Moody kick), 9:58. Commanders 14–13. **Drive: 10 plays, 72 yards, 5:02.**
- DEN – RJ Harvey 1-yard run (Wil Lutz kick), 3:59. Broncos 20–14. **Drive: 11 plays, 72 yards, 5:59.**

**Fourth quarter**

- WAS – Jake Moody 38-yard field goal, 12:37. Broncos 20–17. **Drive: 5 plays, 16 yards, 1:29.**
- WAS – Jake Moody 32-yard field goal, 0:00. Tied 20–20. **Drive: 18 plays, 71 yards, 3:00.**

**Overtime**

- DEN – RJ Harvey 5-yard run (Wil Lutz kick), 6:59. Broncos 27–20. **Drive: 5 plays, 76 yards, 3:01.**
- WAS – Terry McLaurin 3-yard pass from Marcus Mariota (pass failed), 2:47. Broncos 27–26. **Drive: 11 plays, 65 yards, 4:12.**

**Top passers**

- DEN – Bo Nix – 29/45, 321 yards, TD, INT
- WAS – Marcus Mariota – 28/50, 294 yards, 2 TD, INT

**Top rushers**

- DEN – RJ Harvey – 13 rushes, 35 yards, 2 TD
- WAS – Marcus Mariota – 10 rushes, 55 yards

**Top receivers**

- DEN – Evan Engram – 6 receptions, 79 yards
- WAS – Zach Ertz – 10 receptions, 106 yards

In overtime, after Marcus Mariota led the Commanders to a touchdown, the team opted to attempt a two-point conversion for the win. However, Broncos linebacker Nik Bonitto batted away Mariota’s pass, allowing the Broncos to hold on for the victory. With their seventh straight loss, the Commanders fell to 3–9 and finished 2–2 against the AFC West and 2–3 against the AFC.

===== Week 14: at Minnesota Vikings =====
Week 14: Washington Commanders at Minnesota Vikings

Quarter	1	2	3	4	Total
Commanders	0	0	0	0	**0**
**Vikings**	7	7	10	7	**31**

at U.S. Bank Stadium, Minneapolis, Minnesota

- Date: December 7, 2025
- Game time: 1:00 p.m. EST/Noon CST
- Game weather: None (indoor stadium)
- Game attendance: 66,810
- Referee: Brad Allen
- TV announcers (Fox): Adam Amin, Drew Brees, and Kristina Pink
- Recap, Game Book

Game information

**First quarter**

- MIN – Josh Oliver 18-yard pass from J. J. McCarthy (Will Reichard kick), 11:03. Vikings 7–0. **Drive: 7 plays, 61 yards, 3:57.**

**Second quarter**

- MIN – Jordan Mason 8-yard run (Will Reichard kick), 5:41. Vikings 14–0. **Drive: 19 plays, 98 yards, 12:01.**

**Third quarter**

- MIN – Will Reichard 45-yard field goal, 7:01. Vikings 17–0. **Drive: 4 plays, 3 yards, 1:15.**
- MIN – Josh Oliver 6-yard pass from J. J. McCarthy (Will Reichard kick), 2:53. Vikings 24–0. **Drive: 4 plays, 37 yards, 2:04.**

**Fourth quarter**

- MIN – T. J. Hockenson 2-yard pass from J. J. McCarthy (Will Reichard kick), 11:26. Vikings 31–0. **Drive: 9 plays, 66 yards, 4:52.**

**Top passers**

- WAS – Jayden Daniels – 9/20, 78 yards, INT
- MIN – J. J. McCarthy – 16/23, 163 yards, 3 TD

**Top rushers**

- WAS – Chris Rodriguez Jr. – 10 rushes, 52 yards
- MIN – Aaron Jones – 14 rushes, 76 yards

**Top receivers**

- WAS – Terry McLaurin – 3 receptions, 41 yards
- MIN – Jordan Addison – 4 receptions, 62 yards

Midway through the third quarter, Jayden Daniels was forced out of the game after he was blocked during an interception return and landed hard on the left elbow he dislocated last month requiring a three-game absence. Additionally, Zach Ertz suffered a torn ACL in his right knee.

Washington suffered its first shutout loss since a 9–0 defeat to the San Francisco 49ers during the 2019 season and was eliminated from playoff contention with the loss. The Commanders were additionally swept by the NFC North.

===== Week 15: at New York Giants =====
Week 15: Washington Commanders at New York Giants

Quarter	1	2	3	4	Total
**Commanders**	3	19	0	7	**29**
Giants	0	7	7	7	**21**

at MetLife Stadium, East Rutherford, New Jersey

- Date: December 14, 2025
- Game time: 1:00 p.m. EST
- Game weather: Overcast, 27 °F (−3 °C)
- Game attendance: 77,481
- Referee: Bill Vinovich
- TV announcers (Fox): Kenny Albert, Jonathan Vilma, and Megan Olivi
- Recap, Game Book

Game information

**First quarter**

- WAS – Jake Moody 46-yard field goal, 9:22. Commanders 3–0. **Drive: 10 plays, 39 yards, 5:38.**

**Second quarter**

- WAS – Jacory Croskey-Merritt 16-yard run (Jake Moody kick), 13:38. Commanders 10–0. **Drive: 4 plays, 47 yards, 1:54.**
- WAS – Jake Moody 39-yard field goal, 8:26. Commanders 13–0. **Drive: 9 plays, 56 yards, 3:43.**
- NYG – Tyrone Tracy Jr. 12-yard run (Younghoe Koo kick), 3:37. Commanders 13–7. **Drive: 10 plays, 65 yards, 4:49.**
- WAS – Jaylin Lane 63-yard punt return (kick failed), 1:05. Commanders 19–7.
- WAS – Jake Moody 42-yard field goal, 0:00. Commanders 22–7. **Drive: 2 plays, 0 yards, 0:10.**

**Third quarter**

- NYG – Tyrone Tracy Jr. 18-yard pass from Jaxson Dart (Younghoe Koo kick), 11:48. Commanders 22–14. **Drive: 7 plays, 82 yards, 3:12.**

**Fourth quarter**

- WAS – Terry McLaurin 51-yard pass from Marcus Mariota (Jake Moody kick), 13:46. Commanders 29–14. **Drive: 2 plays, 59 yards, 1:09.**
- NYG – Wan'Dale Robinson 16-yard pass from Jaxson Dart (Younghoe Koo kick), 3:43. Commanders 29–21. **Drive: 4 plays, 21 yards, 1:56.**

**Top passers**

- WAS – Marcus Mariota – 10/19, 211 yards, TD
- NYG – Jaxson Dart – 20/36, 246 yards, 2 TD, INT

**Top rushers**

- WAS – Jacory Croskey-Merritt – 18 rushes, 96 yards, TD
- NYG – Tyrone Tracy Jr. – 15 rushes, 70 yards, TD

**Top receivers**

- WAS – Terry McLaurin – 3 receptions, 69 yards, TD
- NYG – Theo Johnson – 3 receptions, 72 yards

Noah Brown, Jaylin Lane, and Jordan Magee served as game captains. With the win over the Giants, the Commanders improved to 4–10 and snapped their eight-game losing streak, sweeping the Giants for the second season in a row.

The following day, the Commanders announced that they would shut down Jayden Daniels for the remainder of the season and start backup quarterback Marcus Mariota in his place.

===== Week 16: vs. Philadelphia Eagles =====
Week 16: Philadelphia Eagles at Washington Commanders

Quarter	1	2	3	4	Total
**Eagles**	7	0	7	15	**29**
Commanders	3	7	0	8	**18**

at Northwest Stadium, Landover, Maryland

- Date: December 20
- Game time: 5:00 p.m. EST
- Game weather: Clear, 42 °F (6 °C)
- Game attendance: 64,582
- Referee: Craig Wrolstad
- TV announcers (Fox): Joe Davis, Greg Olsen, and Pam Oliver
- Recap, Game Book

Game information

**First quarter**

- WAS – Jake Moody 20-yard field goal, 11:39. Commanders 3–0. **Drive: 8 plays, 24 yards, 3:16.**
- PHI – Devonta Smith 5-yard pass from Jalen Hurts (Jake Elliott kick), 2:37. Eagles 7–3. **Drive: 7 plays, 63 yards, 3:29.**

**Second quarter**

- WAS – Jacory Croskey-Merritt 1-yard run (Jake Moody kick), 3:40. Commanders 10–7. **Drive: 9 plays, 67 yards, 5:26.**

**Third quarter**

- PHI – Dallas Goedert 15-yard pass from Jalen Hurts (Jake Elliott kick), 3:27. Eagles 14–10. **Drive: 17 plays, 83 yards, 10:35.**

**Fourth quarter**

- PHI – Saquon Barkley 12-yard run (Jake Elliott kick), 11:33. Eagles 21–10. **Drive: 7 plays, 37 yards, 3:59.**
- PHI – Tank Bigsby 22-yard run (Saquon Barkley run), 4:26. Eagles 29–10. **Drive: 4 plays, 80 yards, 2:12.**
- WAS – Chris Rodriguez Jr. 3-yard run (Jeremy McNichols run), 1:10. Eagles 29–18. **Drive: 8 plays, 75 yards, 3:16.**

**Top passers**

- PHI – Jalen Hurts – 22/30, 185 yards, 2 TD
- WAS – Marcus Mariota – 7/14, 95 yards

**Top rushers**

- PHI – Saquon Barkley – 21 rushes, 132 yards, TD
- WAS – Chris Rodriguez Jr. – 15 rushes, 63 yards, TD

**Top receivers**

- PHI – A. J. Brown – 9 receptions, 95 yards
- WAS – Terry McLaurin – 3 receptions, 53 yards

Despite holding a 10–7 lead at halftime, the Commanders allowed 22 points in the second half, including touchdowns to tight end Dallas Goedert and running back Saquon Barkley. In the third quarter, backup quarterback Marcus Mariota left the game due to injury and was replaced by third-stringer Josh Johnson. With their ninth loss in their last ten games, the Commanders fell to 4–11 and 2–2 against the NFC East.

During the fourth quarter, a brawl broke out involving two Commanders defenders, defensive lineman Javon Kinlaw and safety Quan Martin, and one Eagles player, offensive lineman Tyler Steen. All three were disqualified after being flagged for unnecessary roughness during the altercation.

===== Week 17: vs. Dallas Cowboys =====
Week 17: Dallas Cowboys at Washington Commanders

Quarter	1	2	3	4	Total
**Cowboys**	7	17	3	3	**30**
Commanders	3	7	10	3	**23**

at Northwest Stadium, Landover, Maryland

- Date: December 25, 2025
- Game time: 1:00 p.m. EST
- Game weather: Sunny, 50 °F (10 °C)
- Game attendance: 64,407
- Referee: Brad Rogers
- TV announcers (Netflix): Ian Eagle, Matt Ryan, Nate Burleson, Melanie Collins, and Sara Walsh
- Recap, Game Book

Game information

**First quarter**

- DAL – Jake Ferguson 6-yard pass from Dak Prescott (Brandon Aubrey kick), 9:42. Cowboys 7–0. **Drive: 13 plays, 78 yards, 5:18.**
- WAS – Jake Moody 29-yard field goal, 4:44. Cowboys 7–3. **Drive: 8 plays, 65 yards, 4:58.**

**Second quarter**

- DAL – Javonte Williams 4-yard run (Brandon Aubrey kick), 12:06. Cowboys 14–3. **Drive: 17 plays, 65 yards, 7:38.**
- DAL – KaVontae Turpin 86-yard pass from Dak Prescott (Brandon Aubrey kick), 7:00. Cowboys 21–3. **Drive: 5 plays, 97 yards, 2:09.**
- WAS – Jacory Croskey-Merritt 10-yard run (Jake Moody kick), 4:35. Cowboys 21–10. **Drive: 5 plays, 60 yards, 2:25.**
- DAL – Brandon Aubrey 42-yard field goal, 0:19. Cowboys 24–10. **Drive: 12 plays, 50 yards, 4:16.**

**Third quarter**

- WAS – Jacory Croskey-Merritt 72-yard run (Jake Moody kick), 9:34. Cowboys 24–17. **Drive: 1 play, 72 yards, 0:10.**
- DAL – Brandon Aubrey 52-yard field goal, 4:42. Cowboys 27–17. **Drive: 11 plays, 53 yards, 4:52.**
- WAS – Jake Moody 23-yard field goal, 0:16. Cowboys 27–20. **Drive: 10 plays, 60 yards, 4:26.**

**Fourth quarter**

- DAL – Brandon Aubrey 51-yard field goal, 3:59. Cowboys 30–20. **Drive: 14 plays, 52 yards, 7:33.**
- WAS – Jake Moody 51-yard field goal, 2:09. Cowboys 30–23. **Drive: 7 plays, 39 yards, 1:50.**

**Top passers**

- DAL – Dak Prescott – 19/37, 307 yards, 2 TD
- WAS – Josh Johnson – 15/23, 198 yards

**Top rushers**

- DAL – Malik Davis – 20 rushes, 103 yards
- WAS – Jacory Croskey-Merritt – 11 rushes, 105 yards, 2 TD

**Top receivers**

- DAL – KaVontae Turpin – 1 reception, 86 yards, TD
- WAS – Deebo Samuel – 2 receptions, 68 yards

For the Christmas Day game against the Cowboys, Frankie Luvu, Chris Rodriguez Jr., and Tress Way served as game captains.

With the loss, the Commanders dropped to 4–12 (2–3 against the NFC East), went winless when wearing the Super Bowl Era alternate uniform, and were swept by the Cowboys for the third time in five years. They finished 2–6 at home.

===== Week 18: at Philadelphia Eagles =====
Week 18: Washington Commanders at Philadelphia Eagles

Quarter	1	2	3	4	Total
**Commanders**	0	10	0	14	**24**
Eagles	0	7	10	0	**17**

at Lincoln Financial Field, Philadelphia, Pennsylvania

- Date: January 4
- Game time: 4:25 p.m. EST
- Game weather: Clear, 35 °F (2 °C)
- Game attendance: 69,879
- Referee: Shawn Hochuli
- TV announcers (CBS): Kevin Harlan, Ross Tucker, and Melanie Collins
- Recap, Game Book

Game information

**First quarter**

- No scoring plays

**Second quarter**

- PHI – Grant Calcaterra 15-yard pass from Tanner McKee (Jake Elliott kick), 13:37. Eagles 7–0. **Drive: 9 plays, 80 yards, 3:56.**
- WAS – Chris Rodriguez Jr. 1-yard run (Jake Moody kick), 9:03. Tied 7–7. **Drive: 8 plays, 65 yards, 4:34.**
- WAS – Jake Moody 56-yard field goal, 0:00. Commanders 10–7. **Drive: 5 plays, 33 yards, 0:48.**

**Third quarter**

- PHI – Tank Bigsby 2-yard run (Jake Elliott kick), 6:27. Eagles 14–10. **Drive: 8 plays, 28 yards, 4:25.**
- PHI – Jake Elliott 39-yard field goal, 0:30. Eagles 17–10. **Drive: 10 plays, 52 yards, 4:19.**

**Fourth quarter**

- WAS – John Bates 2-yard pass from Josh Johnson (Jake Moody kick), 9:35. Tied 17–17. **Drive: 9 plays, 65 yards, 5:55.**
- WAS – Josh Johnson 1-yard run (Jake Moody kick), 2:32. Commanders 24–17. **Drive: 9 plays, 77 yards, 6:05.**

**Top passers**

- WAS – Josh Johnson – 14/22, 131 yards, TD, INT
- PHI – Tanner McKee – 21/40, 241 yards, TD, INT

**Top rushers**

- WAS – Chris Rodriguez Jr. – 16 rushes, 65 yards, TD
- PHI – Tank Bigsby – 16 rushes, 75 yards, TD

**Top receivers**

- WAS – Terry McLaurin – 4 receptions, 57 yards
- PHI – Devonta Smith – 3 receptions, 52 yards

Jacob Martin, Jeremy McNichols, and Colson Yankoff served as game captains. With the win, the Commanders finished their season with a 5–12 record, while also going 3–3 against the NFC East and 3–6 on the road.
