= Jeremy McNichols =

American football player (born 1995)

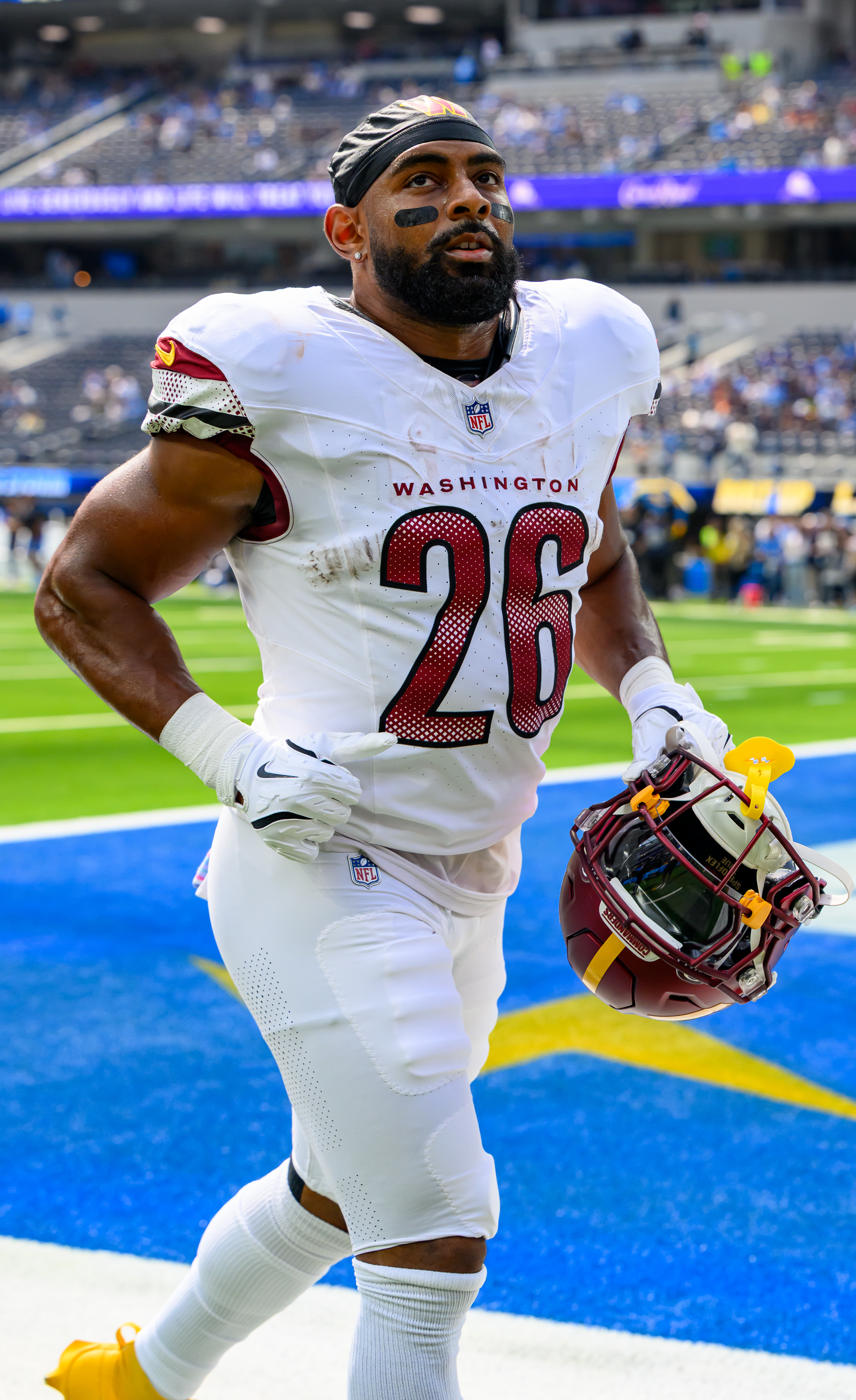
- McNichols with the Washington Commanders in 2025

No. 26 – Washington Commanders
- Position: Running back
- Roster status: Injured reserve

Personal information
- Born: December 26, 1995 (age 30); Long Beach, California, U.S.
- Listed height: 5 ft 9 in (1.75 m)
- Listed weight: 205 lb (93 kg)

Career information
- High school: Santa Margarita Catholic (Rancho Santa Margarita, California)
- College: Boise State (2014–2016)
- NFL draft: 2017: 5th round, 162nd overall pick

Career history
- Tampa Bay Buccaneers (2017)*; San Francisco 49ers (2017); Indianapolis Colts (2018); Denver Broncos (2018)*; Tennessee Titans (2018); Chicago Bears (2019)*; Jacksonville Jaguars (2019); Tennessee Titans (2020–2021); Atlanta Falcons (2022)*; Pittsburgh Steelers (2022); San Francisco 49ers (2023); Washington Commanders (2024–present)
- * Offseason or practice squad member only

Awards and highlights
- 2× second-team All-Mountain West (2015, 2016)

Career NFL statistics as of 2026
- Rushing yards: 880
- Rushing average: 4.4
- Rushing touchdowns: 6
- Receptions: 75
- Receiving yards: 525
- Receiving touchdowns: 1
- Stats at Pro Football Reference

Jeremy Theron McNichols (born December 26, 1995) is an American professional football running back for the Washington Commanders of the National Football League (NFL). He played college football for the Boise State Broncos and was selected by the Tampa Bay Buccaneers in the fifth round of the 2017 NFL draft. McNichols has also been a member of several other NFL teams.

== Early life ==
McNichols attended Lakewood High School in Lakewood, California before transferring to Santa Margarita Catholic High School in Rancho Santa Margarita, California for his senior year. Growing up, McNichols and fellow NFL player John Ross played in Snoop Dogg's youth football league in Long Beach, California. McNichols played running back and wide receiver in high school, and his versatility led to him earning the nickname "McWeapon". During his career, McNichols rushed for 877 yards with nine touchdowns and had 72 receptions for 934 yards and 10 touchdowns. He originally committed to the University of Utah to play college football but later changed to Boise State University.

== College career ==
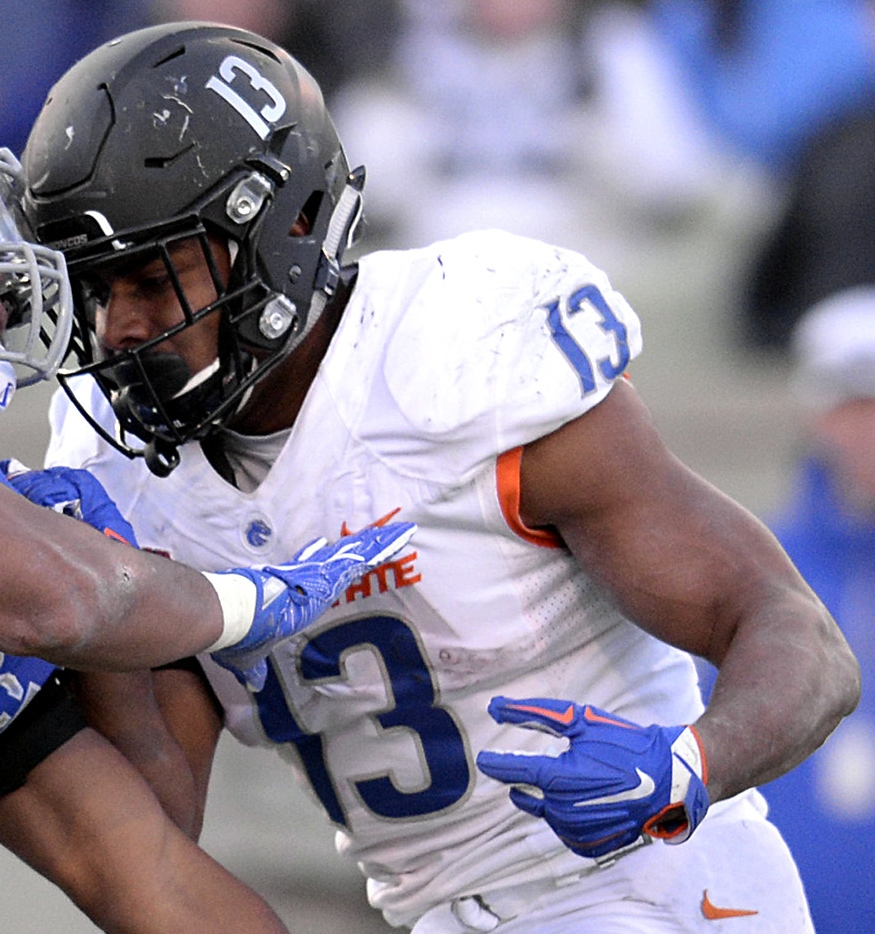
McNichols in 2016

McNichols enrolled at Boise State in early August 2014 before the start of fall camp. Heading into the season, McNichols planned on being redshirted and sat out the first five games before the redshirt was pulled. McNichols ended up playing in nine games as a true freshman during the 2014 season. He had 17 carries for 159 yards and a touchdown to go along with 15 receptions for 155 yards and a touchdown.

As a sophomore in 2015, McNichols played in 12 games, rushing 240 times for 1,337 yards and 20 touchdowns. He also had 51 receptions for 460 yards and six touchdowns.

As a junior in 2016, McNichols had 314 carries for 1,709 yards and 23 touchdowns to go along with 37 receptions for 474 yards and four touchdowns in 13 games.

On December 26, 2016, McNichols announced that he would forgo his senior season and enter the 2017 NFL Draft.

=== Statistics ===
Year	Team	Games		Rushing				Receiving			
Year	Team	GP	GS	Att	Yds	Avg	TD	Rec	Yds	Avg	TD
2014	Boise State	9	0	17	159	9.4	1	15	155	10.3	1
2015	Boise State	12	12	240	1,337	5.6	20	51	460	9.0	6
2016	Boise State	13	13	314	1,709	5.4	23	37	474	12.8	4
Career		34	25	571	3,205	5.6	44	103	1,089	10.6	11

== Professional career ==
Pre-draft measurables
Height	Weight	Arm length	Hand span	Wingspan	40-yard dash	10-yard split	20-yard split	20-yard shuttle	Three-cone drill	Vertical jump	Broad jump
5 ft 8 5/8 in (1.74 m)	214 lb (97 kg)	31 1/2 in (0.80 m)	10 in (0.25 m)	6 ft 2 7/8 in (1.90 m)	4.49 s	1.53 s	2.62 s	4.28 s	6.93 s	35.5 in (0.90 m)	10 ft 1 in (3.07 m)
All values from NFL Combine

=== Tampa Bay Buccaneers ===
McNichols was drafted by the Tampa Bay Buccaneers in the fifth round (162nd overall) of the 2017 NFL draft. He was the 17th running back selected in that year's draft. McNichols was released on September 2.

=== San Francisco 49ers ===
On September 4, 2017, McNichols was signed to the San Francisco 49ers' practice squad. He was promoted to the active roster on November 29.

On September 1, 2018, McNichols was waived by the 49ers.

=== Indianapolis Colts ===
On September 3, 2018, McNichols was signed to the Indianapolis Colts' practice squad. He was released 10 days later, but was re-signed on September 18. McNichols was promoted to the active roster on September 28, but was waived again four days later.

=== Denver Broncos ===
On October 10, 2018, McNichols signed to the Denver Broncos' practice squad.

=== Tennessee Titans ===
On December 3, 2018, McNichols was signed by the Tennessee Titans off the Broncos' practice squad. He was waived on August 31, 2019.

=== Chicago Bears ===
On November 19, 2019, McNichols was signed to the Chicago Bears' practice squad. He was waived on December 11.

=== Jacksonville Jaguars ===
On December 18, 2019, McNichols was signed to the Jacksonville Jaguars' practice squad. He was promoted to the active roster 10 days later.

On May 4, 2020, the Jaguars waived McNichols to clear roster space for veteran running back Chris Thompson.

=== Tennessee Titans (second stint) ===
==== 2020 season ====
McNichols had a tryout with the Tennessee Titans on August 23, 2020, and re-signed with the team three days later. He was waived on September 5, but was signed to the practice squad the next day. After being elevated to the active roster for the first two games of the season, McNichols was promoted to the active roster on September 23.

During a Week 6 42–36 overtime victory over the Houston Texans, McNichols had five carries for 51 yards and two receptions for 11 yards in a dominant Titans performance, who had 601 offensive yards, the most in franchise history. During Week 13 against the Cleveland Browns, McNichols scored his first NFL touchdown on a one-yard rush and caught three passes for 15 yards in the 41–35 loss.

McNichols finished the 2020 season playing in all 16 games as a backup to Derrick Henry, recording 47 carries for 204 yards and a touchdown to go along with 12 receptions for 55 yards. The Titans finished atop the AFC South with an 11–5 record and qualified for the playoffs. During the Wild Card Round against the Baltimore Ravens, McNichols recorded a four-yard carry in the 20–13 loss.

==== 2021 season ====
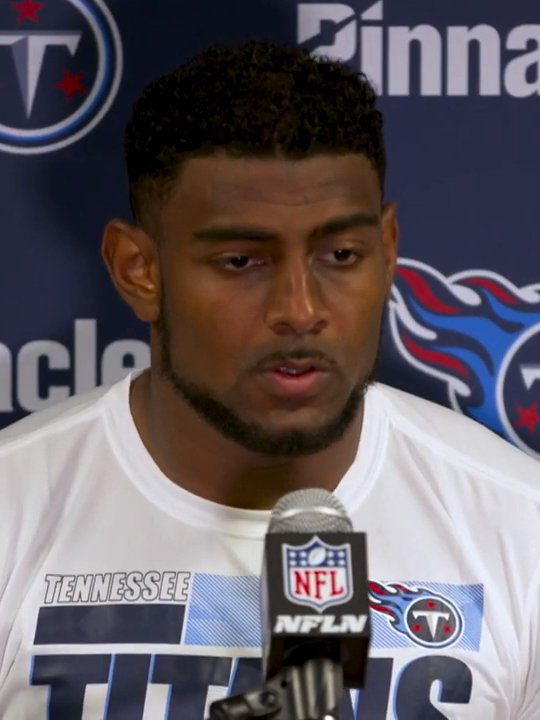
McNichols in 2021

During a Week 3 25–16 victory over the Indianapolis Colts, McNichols scored his only touchdown of the season on a 10-yard reception from Ryan Tannehill. In the next game against the New York Jets, McNichols had an 11-yard carry and eight receptions for 74 yards during the 27–24 overtime road loss.

McNichols was waived on January 8, 2022, the day before the regular season finale. He was re-signed to the practice squad on January 11. McNichols finished the 2021 season with 41 carries for 156 yards to go along with 28 receptions for 240 yards and a touchdown in 16 games and no starts.

=== Atlanta Falcons ===
On May 26, 2022, McNichols signed with the Atlanta Falcons. He was released on June 16.

=== Pittsburgh Steelers ===
On July 26, 2022, McNichols signed a one-year contract with the Pittsburgh Steelers. He was placed on injured reserve eight days later.

=== San Francisco 49ers (second stint) ===
On August 8, 2023, McNichols re-signed with the 49ers. He was released on August 29, and re-signed to the practice squad on September 26. McNichols was released again the next day, but was re-signed on October 4. He was signed to the active roster on December 21, but was waived six days later and was re-signed to the practice squad. McNichols was released once more on January 16, 2024.

=== Washington Commanders ===
==== 2024 season ====
On April 1, 2024, McNichols signed with the Washington Commanders.

During a Week 4 42–14 road victory the Arizona Cardinals, McNichols recorded eight carries for 68 yards and two touchdowns to go along with a six-yard reception. In the next game against the Browns, he had seven carries for 44 yards and a touchdown during the 34–13 victory. During Week 10 against his former team, the Pittsburgh Steelers, McNichols rushed for seven yards and his fourth touchdown of the season in the narrow 28–27 loss.

McNichols finished the 2024 season with 55 carries for 261 yards and four touchdowns to go along with nine receptions for 27 yards and seven returns for 164 yards in 17 games and one start. The Commanders finished second in the NFC East with a 12–5 record and qualified for the playoffs. During the postseason, McNichols had five carries for nine yards and a 17-yard return before the Commanders lost on the road to the Philadelphia Eagles 55–23 in the NFC Championship Game.

==== 2025 season ====
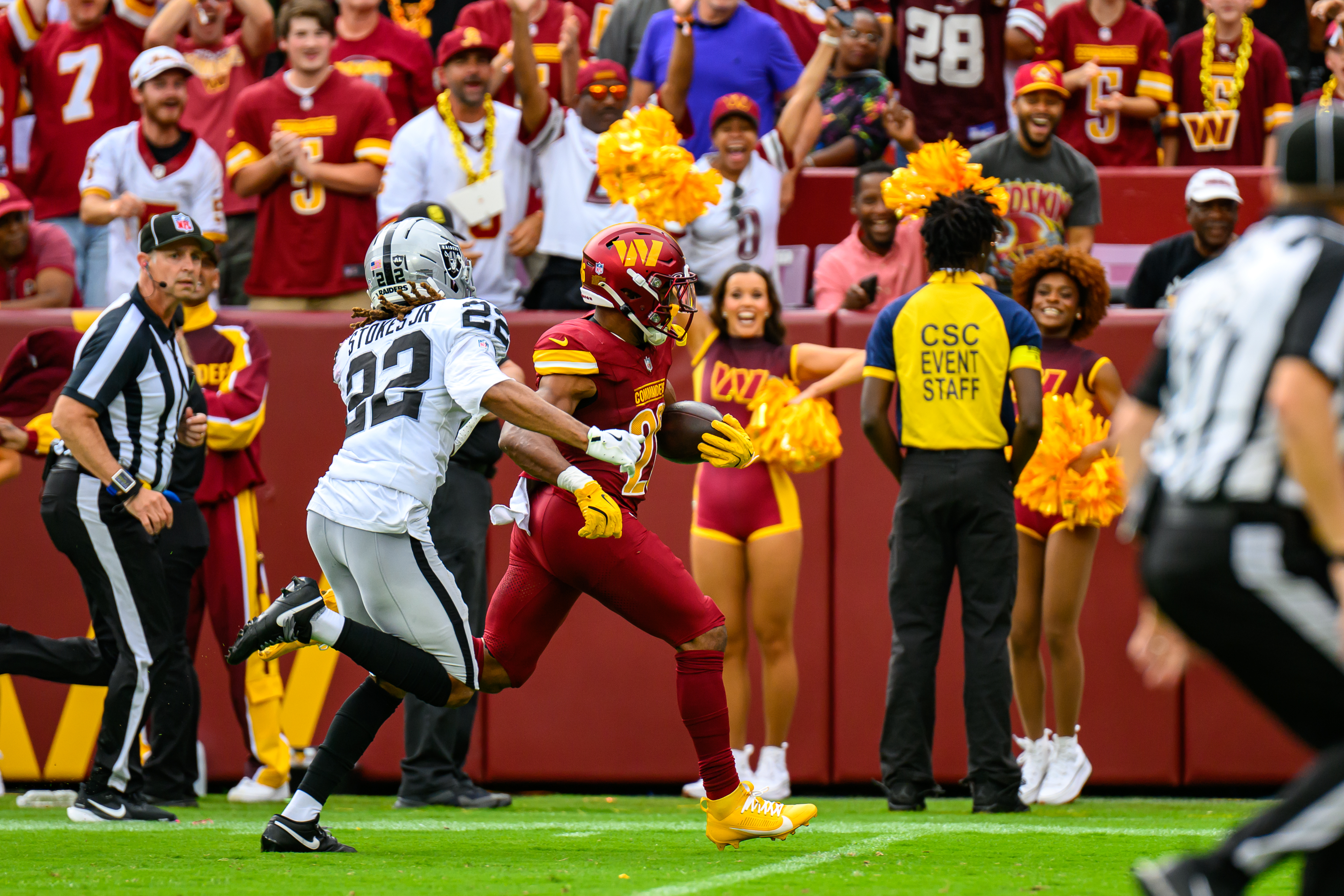
McNichols in 2025

On March 14, 2025, McNichols re-signed with the Commanders on a one-year deal.

During a Week 3 41–24 victory over the Las Vegas Raiders, McNichols rushed for 78 yards and a 60-yard touchdown, making it his career longest rushing touchdown and the longest touchdown rush in the Washington franchise since 2019. During Week 8 against the Kansas City Chiefs on Monday Night Football, McNichols had five receptions for 64 yards in the 28–7 road loss.

McNichols finished the 2025 season with 44 carries for 221 yards and a touchdown to go along with 25 receptions for 196 yards in 17 games and one start.

==== 2026 season ====
On March 19, 2026, McNichols re-signed with the Commanders on a one-year, $1.49 million contract. On August 30, he was placed on injured reserve with a quadriceps injury.

McNichols was activated on October 19 for the Week 6 matchup against his former team, the San Francisco 49ers, on Monday Night Football. McNichols finished the 23–17 road loss with five carries for 13 yards. Two weeks later against the Eagles on Sunday Night Football, he had five carries for 21 yards before leaving the eventual 27–10 victory in the third quarter with a foot injury. McNichols was placed on injured reserve again on November 3. The next day, it was announced that he would be on injured reserve for the rest of the season.

== NFL career statistics ==
Legend
**Bold**	Career high

=== Regular season ===
Year	Team	Games		Rushing					Receiving					Returning					Fumbles	
Year	Team	GP	GS	Att	Yds	Avg	Lng	TD	Rec	Yds	Avg	Lng	TD	Att	Yds	Avg	Lng	TD	Fum	Lost
2017	SF	2	0	0	0	0.0	0	0	0	0	0.0	0	0	0	0	0.0	0	0	0	0
2018	IND	1	0	2	4	2.0	7	0	0	0	0.0	0	0	0	0	0.0	0	0	0	0
2020	TEN	14	0	47	204	4.3	20	1	12	55	4.6	9	0	0	0	0.0	0	0	0	0
2021	TEN	16	0	41	156	3.8	14	0	**28**	**240**	**8.6**	**27**	**1**	2	31	15.5	16	0	0	0
2022	PIT	0	0	Did not play due to injury																
2023	SF	3	0	0	0	0.0	0	0	0	0	0.0	0	0	0	0	0.0	0	0	0	0
2024	WAS	17	1	**55**	**261**	4.7	28	**4**	9	27	3.0	10	0	**7**	**164**	**23.4**	**29**	0	0	0
2025	WAS	17	1	44	221	**5.0**	**60T**	1	25	196	7.8	24	0	2	29	14.5	15	0	**1**	**1**
2026	WAS	2	0	10	34	3.4	7	0	1	7	7.0	7	0	0	0	0.0	0	0	0	0
Career		73	2	199	880	4.4	60T	6	75	525	7.0	27	1	11	224	20.4	29	0	1	1

=== Postseason ===
Year	Team	Games		Rushing					Receiving					Returning					Fumbles	
Year	Team	GP	GS	Att	Yds	Avg	Lng	TD	Rec	Yds	Avg	Lng	TD	Ret	Yds	Avg	Lng	TD	Fum	Lost
2020	TEN	1	0	1	4	**4.0**	**4**	0	0	0	0.0	0	0	0	0	0.0	0	0	0	0
2024	WAS	3	0	**5**	**9**	1.8	3	**1**	0	0	0.0	0	0	**1**	**17**	**17.0**	**17**	0	**1**	**1**
Career		4	0	6	13	2.2	4	1	0	0	0.0	0	0	1	17	17.0	17	0	1	1
