= Jacory Croskey-Merritt =

American football player (born 2001)

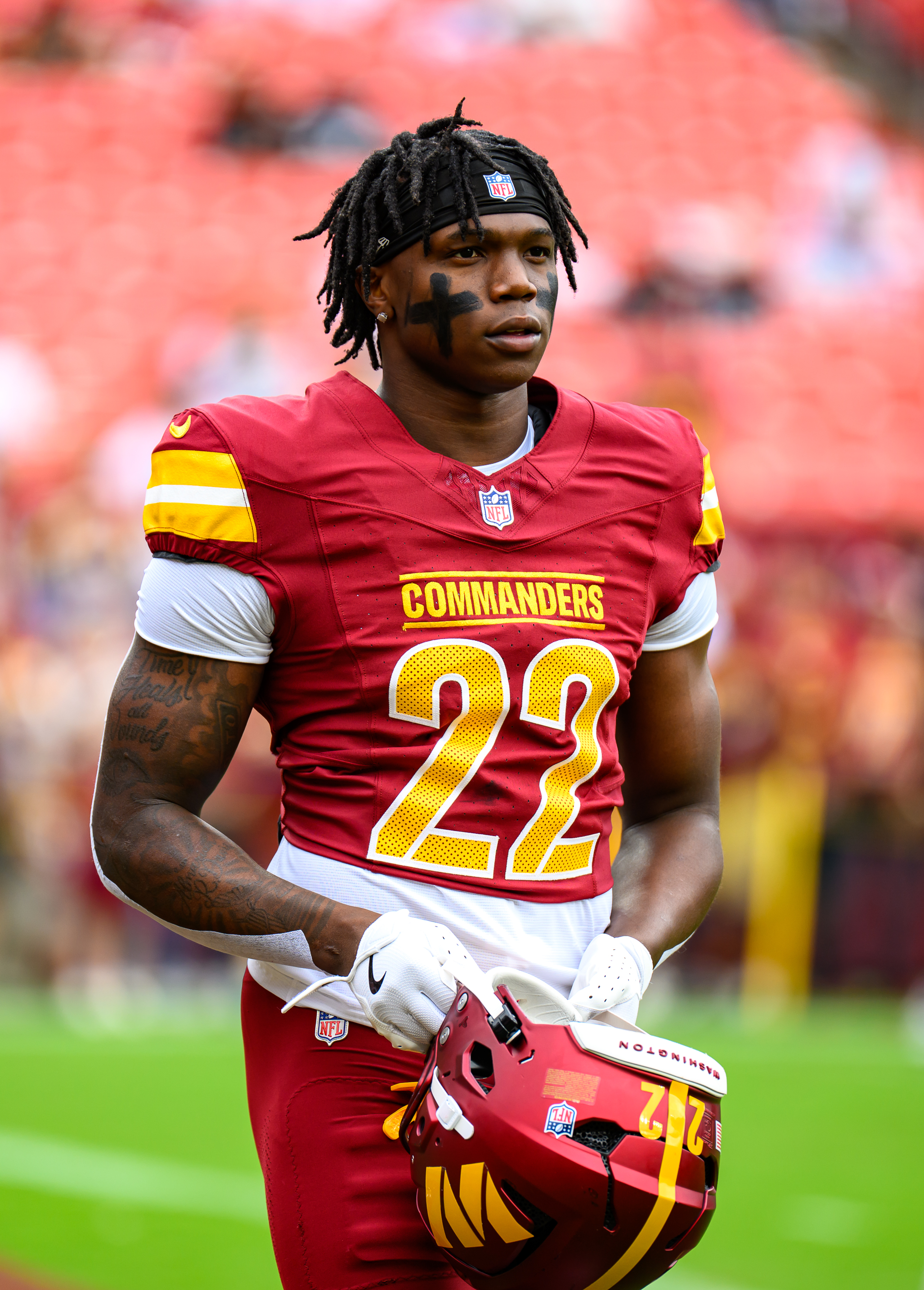
- Croskey-Merritt with the Washington Commanders in 2025

No. 22 – Washington Commanders
- Position: Running back
- Roster status: Injured reserve

Personal information
- Born: April 12, 2001 (age 25); Montgomery, Alabama, U.S.
- Listed height: 5 ft 11 in (1.80 m)
- Listed weight: 208 lb (94 kg)

Career information
- High school: Sidney Lanier (Montgomery)
- College: Alabama State (2019–2022); New Mexico (2023); Arizona (2024)
- NFL draft: 2025: 7th round, 245th overall pick

Career history
- Washington Commanders (2025–present)

Awards and highlights
- Second-team All-Mountain West (2023)

Career NFL statistics as of Week 5, 2026
- Rushing yards: 1,044
- Rushing average: 4.3
- Rushing touchdowns: 10
- Receptions: 14
- Receiving yards: 108
- Stats at Pro Football Reference

Jacory "Bill" Croskey-Merritt (born April 12, 2001) is an American professional football running back for the Washington Commanders of the National Football League (NFL). He played college football for the Alabama State Hornets, New Mexico Lobos, and Arizona Wildcats. Croskey-Merritt was selected by the Commanders in the seventh round of the 2025 NFL draft, leading all rookies in rushing touchdowns with eight during the season.

== Early life ==
Croskey-Merritt was born in Montgomery, Alabama, on April 12, 2001, later attending Sidney Lanier High School. He was rated as a zero-star recruit and committed to play college football for the Alabama State Hornets.

== College career ==
=== Alabama State ===
In 2022, Croskey-Merritt rushed 120 times for 526 yards and four touchdowns. In four years with the Hornets, he rushed for 1,164 yards and 13 touchdowns. After the 2022 season, Croskey-Merritt entered his name into the transfer portal.

=== New Mexico ===
Croskey-Merritt transferred to play for the New Mexico Lobos. In week 13 of the 2023 season, he ran for 204 yards and two touchdowns in a win over Fresno State. In the 2023 regular season finale, Croskey-Merritt rushed for 233 yards versus Utah State. During the 2023 season, he ran 189 times for 1,190 yards and 17 touchdowns and hauled in eight receptions for 72 yards and a touchdown, earning second-team all-Mountain West honors. After the season, Croskey-Merritt entered into the transfer portal again.

=== Arizona ===
He entered the transfer portal in 2024 as a 3 star transfer. Croskey-Merritt originally transferred to play for the Arizona Wildcats, however he would later flip to play for the Ole Miss Rebels, before again joining Arizona. Due to eligibility issues stemming from an NCAA discrepancy regarding his jersey number 21 being used by another player after redshirting as a freshman at Alabama State in 2019, he appeared in just one game in 2024 where he rushed for 106 yards and a touchdown. Croskey-Merritt declared for the 2025 NFL draft following the season. He played in the 2025 East–West Shrine Bowl, where he was named its offensive MVP after rushing for 97 yards and two touchdowns.

== Professional career ==
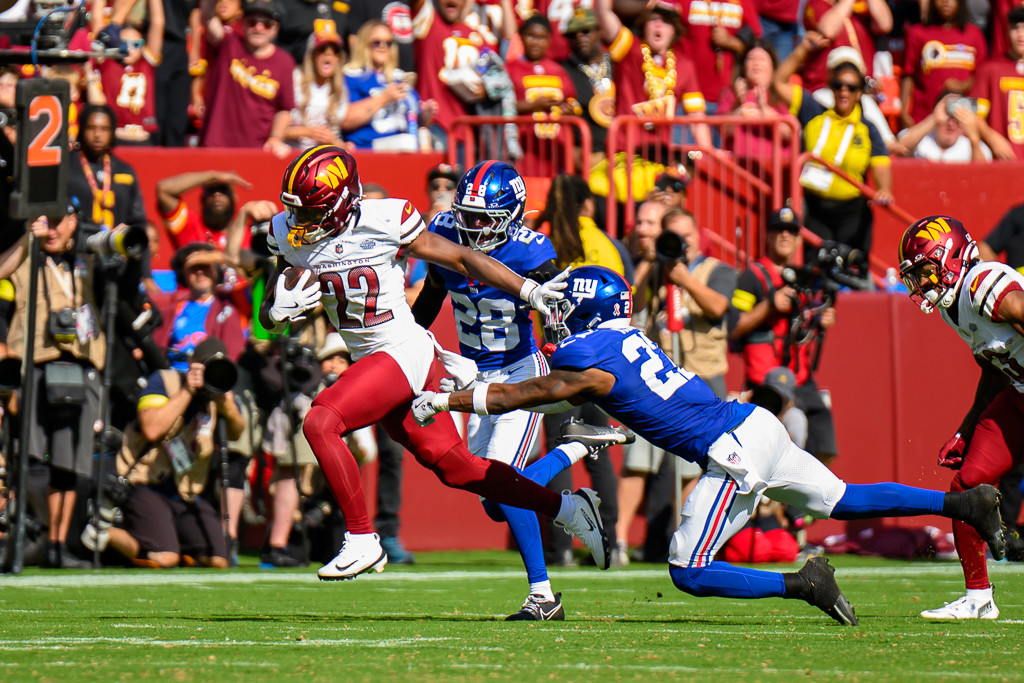
Croskey-Merritt with the Washington Commanders against the New York Giants, 2025

Pre-draft measurables
Height	Weight	Arm length	Hand span	Wingspan	40-yard dash	10-yard split	20-yard split	20-yard shuttle	Three-cone drill	Vertical jump	Broad jump	Bench press
5 ft 10 1/4 in (1.78 m)	206 lb (93 kg)	31 3/4 in (0.81 m)	9 in (0.23 m)	6 ft 5 1/8 in (1.96 m)	4.45 s	1.50 s	2.59 s	4.44 s	7.28 s	41.5 in (1.05 m)	10 ft 4 in (3.15 m)	17 reps
All values from Pro Day

Croskey-Merritt was selected by the Washington Commanders in the seventh round (245th overall) of the 2025 NFL draft. He signed his four-year rookie contract on May 9, 2025. Croskey-Merritt earned Pepsi NFL Rookie of the Week honors after 10 rushes for 82 yards and a touchdown in the season opener against the New York Giants. In Week 5, He ran for 150 yards and two touchdowns against the Los Angeles Chargers, earning FedEx Ground Player of the Week and Rookie of the Week honors. In the Week 15 win over the Giants, he recorded 96 rushing yards and one rushing touchdown. On the Christmas matchup against the Dallas Cowboys, he had a strong performance with 105 rushing yards and two touchdowns. In that game, he had a 72-yard rushing touchdown, which was the fourth overall longest touchdown rush and fifth overall longest single rush in the franchise's history. He finished the 2025 season with 805 rushing yards and eight touchdowns, with the latter stat being highest among all rookies.

On October 19, 2026 the Commanders placed Croskey-Merritt on injured reserve.

=== Statistics ===
NFL statistics
Year	Team	Games		Rushing					Receiving					Fumbles	
Year	Team	GP	GS	Att	Yds	Avg	Lng	TD	Rec	Yds	Avg	Lng	TD	Fum	Lost
2025	WAS	17	7	175	805	4.6	72	8	9	68	7.6	28	0	4	2
2026	WAS	5	5	67	239	3.6	33	2	5	40	8.0	35	0	1	0
Career		22	12	242	1,044	4.3	72	10	14	108	7.7	35	0	5	2

== Personal life ==
He took the nickname after the titular character from the children's television series Little Bill for having a near-bald hairstyle in his youth.
