= Adam Peters =

American football executive (born 1979)

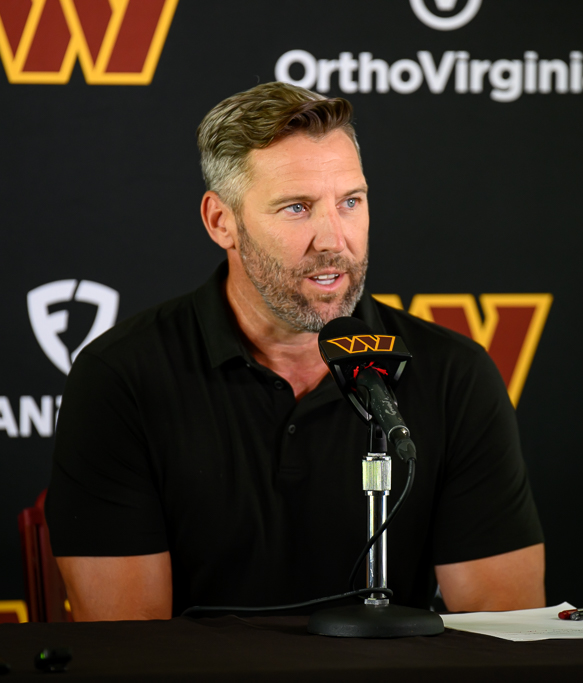
- Peters as Washington Commanders general manager, 2025

Washington Commanders
- Title: General manager

Personal information
- Born: May 24, 1979 (age 47); Mountain View, California, U.S.
- Listed height: 6 ft 3 in (1.91 m)
- Listed weight: 226 lb (103 kg)

Career information
- Positions: Tight end; defensive end
- High school: Monta Vista (Cupertino, California)
- College: West Valley (1997–1998); UCLA (1999–2001)

Career history
- UCLA Bruins (2002); Football operations assistant; New England Patriots (2003–2008); Scouting assistant (2003–2004); Pro scout (2005); Area scout (2006–2008); Denver Broncos (2009–2016); Regional scout (2009–2010); National scout (2011–2013); Assistant director of college scouting (2014–2015); Director of college scouting (2016); San Francisco 49ers (2017–2023); Vice president of player personnel (2017–2020); Assistant general manager (2021–2023); Washington Commanders (2024–present); General manager

Awards and highlights
- 3× Super Bowl champion (XXXVIII, XXXIX, 50)
- Executive profile at Pro Football Reference

Frederick Adam Peters (born May 24, 1979) is an American professional football executive who is the general manager (GM) for the Washington Commanders of the National Football League (NFL). His NFL career began as a scout with the New England Patriots in 2003, spending six seasons with them before joining the Denver Broncos in 2009.

Peters served as the Broncos' college scouting director for three seasons before joining the San Francisco 49ers in 2017. He worked closely with general manager John Lynch, initially as vice president of player personnel and later as assistant general manager being named Commanders GM in 2024. Peters has been a part of three Super Bowl-winning teams, two with the Patriots and one with the Broncos.

== Early life ==
Frederick Adam Peters was born on May 24, 1979, in Mountain View, California, and raised in nearby Cupertino. He attended Monta Vista High School, earning all-conference honors in football as a tight end and in baseball as a left fielder and first baseman. He enrolled at West Valley College, a junior college in Saratoga, California, in 1997. Peters was a tight end and team captain for their football team, earning two All-Coast Conference honors. He transferred to the University of California, Los Angeles (UCLA) in 1999 to play as a reserve defensive end for the Bruins. Peters decided to stop playing football midway through his time at UCLA, believing that he had no future as a player as teammates like DeShaun Foster were "bigger, stronger, faster, and better" than him. He graduated with a psychology degree in 2002, working with the Bruins as a graduate assistant in football operations that season as a way to remain in the sport.

== Career ==
=== Early scouting and executive roles ===
Peters' career began following a visit by New England Patriots executives Scott Pioli and Jason Licht to UCLA in 2002. Peters, substituting for his boss who was out of town, provided film and other information on the school's NFL draft prospects. Pioli hired him as a scouting assistant for the 2003 NFL Combine after being impressed by his football acumen, with Peters temporarily moving to live with scout Nick Caserio. As an assistant, he put together film of prospects, drove players to doctors and hospitals, and performed data entry until becoming an area scout in 2005.

The Patriots made four AFC Championship Game appearances and won Super Bowl XXXVIII and XXXIX during his tenure, with Peters leaving to join the Denver Broncos in January 2009 as he felt unable to rise further in a department that included future general managers in Licht, Caserio, Thomas Dimitroff, Bob Quinn, Jon Robinson, and Monti Ossenfort. Peters worked as a regional and national scout with the Broncos before being promoted to assistant director of college scouting in July 2014. He was promoted to director of college scouting in 2016, with Denver appearing in Super Bowl XLVIII and winning Super Bowl 50 during his tenure.

=== San Francisco 49ers ===
Peters was named vice president of player personnel for the San Francisco 49ers on January 31, 2017. He was the first hire made by 49ers general manager (GM) John Lynch, who had no prior front office experience; they had met after Lynch attended Broncos draft meetings as a guest the previous year. Peters was promoted to assistant GM on February 19, 2021. During his tenure, he assisted in the scouting of later-round draft selections such as George Kittle, Fred Warner, Dre Greenlaw, Talanoa Hufanga, and Brock Purdy who helped the 49ers appear in four NFC Championship Games and Super Bowls LIV and LVIII.

=== Washington Commanders ===
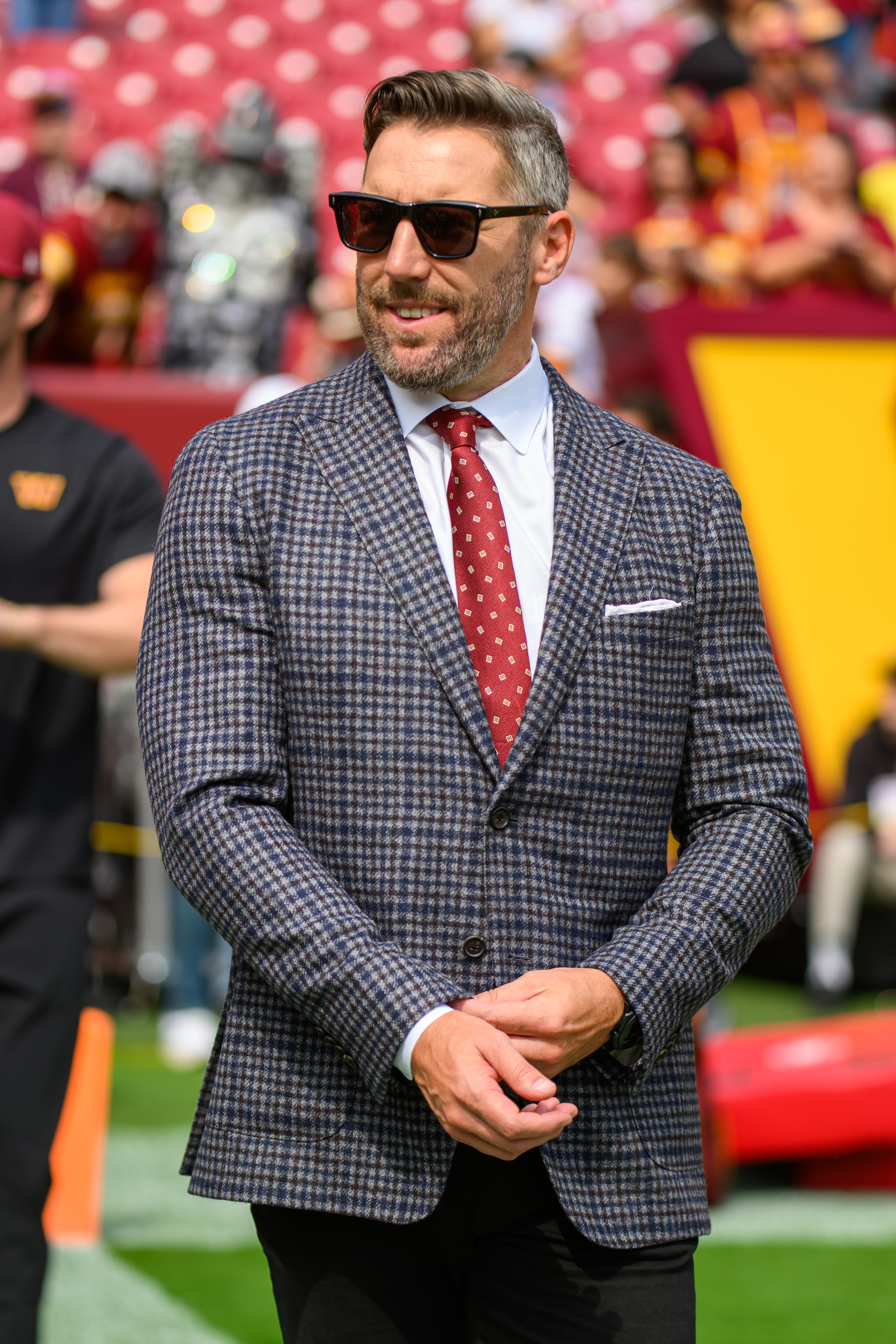
Peters during a Washington Commanders game, 2025

Peters was named general manager of the Washington Commanders on January 15, 2024. He hired Dan Quinn as head coach and selected quarterback Jayden Daniels second overall in the 2024 NFL draft. In Peters' first season, the Commanders recorded their highest win total (12–5) and reached their first NFC Championship Game appearance since 1991.

== Personal life ==
Peters is married to Jennifer Peters; the couple have two daughters. Growing up in the San Francisco Bay Area, he was inspired by former 49ers tight end Brent Jones to play the position. In late 2025, Peters was part of a UCLA search committee that assisted with selecting Bob Chesney as the team's head football coach.
