= 2000 New York Giants season =

NFL team season (lost Super Bowl)

- Owner: Wellington Mara; Robert Tisch
- General manager: Ernie Accorsi
- Head coach: Jim Fassel
- Home stadium: Giants Stadium

Results
- Record: 12–4
- Division place: 1st NFC East
- Playoffs: Won Divisional Playoffs (vs. Eagles) 20–10; Won NFC Championship (vs. Vikings) 41–0; Lost Super Bowl XXXV (vs. Ravens) 7–34
- Pro Bowlers: 2: G Ron Stone; LB Jessie Armstead

Uniform
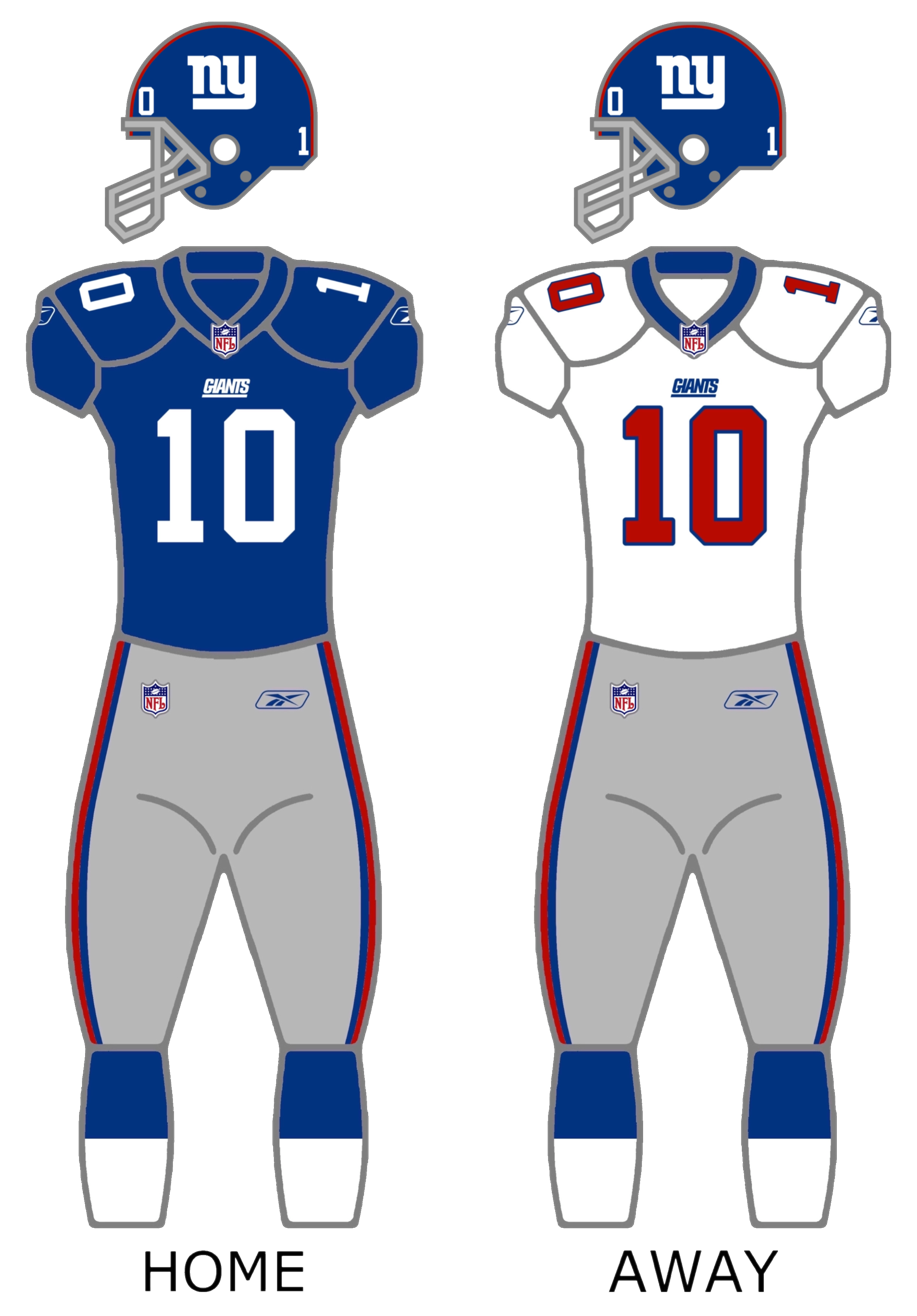

The 2000 season was the New York Giants' 76th in the National Football League (NFL) and the fourth under head coach Jim Fassel.

The season marked the Giants' "NY" helmet logo returning again for the first full season since 1975. The team finished with a record of 12–4, clinching their first winning season, playoff berth, and division title since 1997. In the playoffs, they defeated the Philadelphia Eagles in the divisional round 20–10, then shut out the Minnesota Vikings in the NFC Championship game 41–0, making it to Super Bowl XXXV. However, the Giants were handily beaten by the Baltimore Ravens 34–7.

== Offseason ==
Additions	Subtractions
LB Micheal Barrow (Panthers)	LB Marcus Buckley (Falcons)
CB Dave Thomas (Jaguars)	T Scott Gragg (49ers)
C Dusty Zeigler (Bills)	QB Kent Graham (Steelers)
T Lomas Brown (Browns)	T Roman Oben (Browns)
G Glenn Parker (Chiefs)	WR David Patten (Browns)
S Omar Stoutmire (Jets)	S Percy Ellsworth (Browns)
	CB Phillippi Sparks (Cowboys)
	LB Scott Galyon (Dolphins)
	CB Jeremy Lincoln (Broncos)
	DT Bernard Holsey (Colts)
	C Lance Scott (Patriots)

=== NFL draft ===
2000 New York Giants draft
Round	Pick	Player	Position	College	Notes
1	11	Ron Dayne	RB	Wisconsin	
2	42	Cornelius Griffin	DT	Alabama	
3	73	Ron Dixon	WR	Lambuth	
4	105	Brandon Short	LB	Penn State	
5	140	Ralph Brown	DB	Nebraska	
6	177	Dhani Jones	LB	Michigan	
7	217	Jeremiah Parker	DE	California	
Made roster

=== Undrafted free agents ===
2000 undrafted free agents of note
Player	Position	College
Chris Bober	Guard	Nebraska–Omaha
Bill Burke	Quarterback	Michigan State
Pita Elisara	Guard	Indiana
Jim Goff	Tackle	Lafayette
Jack Golden	Linebacker	Oklahoma State
Chris Ziemann	Tackle	Michigan

== Personnel ==
=== Staff ===
2000 New York Giants staff
Front office: President, co-CEO – Wellington Mara; Chairman, co-CEO – Preston Robert Tisch; General manager – Ernie Accorsi; Head coaches: Head coach – Jim Fassel; Offensive coaches: Offensive coordinator/quarterbacks – Sean Payton; Running backs – Mike Gillhamer; Wide receivers – Jimmy Robinson; Tight ends – Mike Pope; Offensive line – Jim McNally	Defensive coaches: Defensive coordinator – John Fox; Defensive line – Denny Marcin; Linebackers – Tom Olivadotti; Defensive backs – Johnnie Lynn; Defensive quality control – Dave Brazil; Special teams coaches: Special teams – Larry Mac Duff; Strength and conditioning: Strength and conditioning – John Dunn; Assistant strength and conditioning – Craig Stoddard

=== Roster ===
2000 New York Giants roster
Quarterbacks (QB): 18 Mike Cherry; 5 Kerry Collins; 17 Jason Garrett; Running backs (RB): 21 Tiki Barber PR; 34 Greg Comella FB; 27 Ron Dayne; 33 Joe Montgomery; 45 Craig Walendy FB; 29 Damon Washington; Wide receivers (WR): 82 Thabiti Davis; 86 Ron Dixon KR; 88 Ike Hilliard; 84 Joe Jurevicius; 81 Amani Toomer; Tight ends (TE): 89 Dan Campbell; 87 Howard Cross; 83 Pete Mitchell	Offensive linemen (OL): 67 Chris Bober G/T; 76 Lomas Brown T; 69 Derek Engler C; 62 Glenn Parker G; 77 Luke Petitgout T; 78 Mike Rosenthal G/T; 65 Ron Stone G; 66 Jason Whittle G; 52 Dusty Zeigler C; Defensive linemen (DL): 97 Cornelius Griffin DT; 93 Ryan Hale DT; 75 Keith Hamilton DT; 94 Cedric Jones DE; 79 Jeremiah Parker DE; 99 Christian Peter DT; 92 Michael Strahan DE; 96 George Williams DE/DT	Linebackers (LB): 98 Jessie Armstead OLB; 58 Micheal Barrow MLB; 90 Jack Golden OLB; 59 Kevin Lewis MLB; 51 Pete Monty MLB; 91 Ryan Phillips OLB; 53 Brandon Short OLB; Defensive backs (DB): 20 Sam Garnes SS; 26 Emmanuel McDaniel CB; 25 Ramos McDonald CB; 31 Jason Sehorn CB; 28 Reggie Stephens CB; 23 Omar Stoutmire; 41 Dave Thomas CB; 37 Lyle West SS; 36 Shaun Williams FS; Special teams (ST): 3 Brad Daluiso K; 2 Jaret Holmes K; 9 Brad Maynard P	Practice squad: 47 Omar Bacon RB; 63 Jim Goff T; 61 Scott Kiernan G; 19 Quinton Spotwood WR; 49 Adam Young TE; Reserve: 44 Sean Bennett RB (IR); 22 Ralph Brown CB (IR); 55 Dhani Jones LB (IR); 43 Dawud Rasheed RB (IR); 54 Vernon Strickland LB (IR); 35 Andre Weathers CB (IR); 74 Chris Ziemann T (IR); Rookies in italics 53 active, 5 reserve, 5 practice squad

== Preseason ==
Week	Date	Opponent	Result	Record	Venue	Recap
1	August 5	Chicago Bears	L 8–20	0–1	Giants Stadium	Recap
2	August 11	at Jacksonville Jaguars	L 13–16	0–2	Alltel Stadium	Recap
3	August 18	at New York Jets	L 24–27	0–3	Giants Stadium	Recap
4	August 25	Baltimore Ravens	L 17–24	0–4	Giants Stadium	Recap

== Regular season ==
The Giants began the 2000 season hoping to get over the hump of coming short during their past two seasons. They would go on to finish the year with a 12–4 record and represented the NFC in Super Bowl XXXV.

With revived quarterback Kerry Collins the passing game improved from a previously mediocre attack. The running game averaged 125.6 yards per game with Ron Dayne and Tiki Barber. The defense allowed just 246 points, with its greatest strength being against the run allowing a third-best 3.2 yards per carry.

Early in the season the Giants’ record stood at 7–2 and coming off two double digit wins, before they lost two straight home games to decline to 7–4. That was when head coach Jim Fassel made a bold move and publicly stated in the postgame press conference: "This team is going to the playoffs". This became the defining moment of the season, and the Giants won their next five games to become the #1 seed in the NFC playoffs.

=== Schedule ===
Week	Date	Opponent	Result	Record	Venue	Recap
1	September 3	**Arizona Cardinals**	**W** 21–16	1–0	Giants Stadium	Recap
2	September 10	at **Philadelphia Eagles**	**W** 33–18	2–0	Veterans Stadium	Recap
3	September 17	at Chicago Bears	**W** 14–7	3–0	Soldier Field	Recap
4	September 24	**Washington Redskins**	**L** 6–16	3–1	Giants Stadium	Recap
5	October 1	at Tennessee Titans	**L** 14–28	3–2	Adelphia Coliseum	Recap
6	October 8	at Atlanta Falcons	**W** 13–6	4–2	Georgia Dome	Recap
7	October 15	**Dallas Cowboys**	**W** 19–14	5–2	Giants Stadium	Recap
8	Bye					
9	October 29	**Philadelphia Eagles**	**W** 24–7	6–2	Giants Stadium	Recap
10	November 5	at Cleveland Browns	**W** 24–3	7–2	Cleveland Browns Stadium	Recap
11	November 12	St. Louis Rams	**L** 24–38	7–3	Giants Stadium	Recap
12	November 19	Detroit Lions	**L** 21–31	7–4	Giants Stadium	Recap
13	November 26	at **Arizona Cardinals**	**W** 31–7	8–4	Sun Devil Stadium	Recap
14	December 3	at **Washington Redskins**	**W** 9–7	9–4	FedExField	Recap
15	December 10	Pittsburgh Steelers	**W** 30–10	10–4	Giants Stadium	Recap
16	December 17	at **Dallas Cowboys**	**W** 17–13	11–4	Texas Stadium	Recap
17	December 23	Jacksonville Jaguars	**W** 28–25	12–4	Giants Stadium	Recap
Note: Intra-division opponents are in **bold** text.

=== Game summaries ===
==== Week 1: vs. Arizona Cardinals ====
Week 1: Arizona Cardinals at New York Giants – Game summary

Quarter	1	2	3	4	Total
Cardinals	0	0	3	13	**16**
**Giants**	7	7	0	7	**21**

at Giants Stadium, East Rutherford, New Jersey

- Date: September 3
- Game time: 1:00 p.m. EDT
- Game weather: Haze, 84 °F (29 °C)
- Game attendance: 77,434
- Referee: Bill Carollo
- TV announcers (Fox): Sam Rosen, Bill Maas and Kevin McCabe

Game information

**First quarter**

- NYG – Tiki Barber 10-yard run (Brad Daluiso kick), 0:00. Giants 7–0. **Drive: 10 plays, 66 yards, 5:19.**

**Second quarter**

- NYG – Tiki Barber 78-yard run (Brad Daluiso kick), 9:31. Giants 14–0. **Drive: 2 plays, 89 yards, 0:40.**

**Third quarter**

- ARI – Cary Blanchard 32-yard field goal, 0:00. Giants 14–3. **Drive: 13 plays, 79 yards, 5:28.**

**Fourth quarter**

- NYG – Ron Dayne 7-yard run (Brad Daluiso kick), 7:28. Giants 21–3. **Drive: 15 plays, 82 yards, 7:32.**
- ARI – David Boston 9-yard pass from Jake Plummer (Cary Blanchard kick), 1:55. Giants 21–10. **Drive: 7 plays, 84 yards, 1:39.**
- ARI – David Boston 25-yard pass from Jake Plummer (pass failed), 0:32. Giants 21–16. **Drive: 7 plays, 57 yards, 1:23.**

**Top passers**

- ARI – Jake Plummer – 28/49, 318 yards, 2 TD, 3 INT
- NYG – Kerry Collins – 17/25, 172 yards, INT

**Top rushers**

- ARI – Jake Plummer – 4 rushes, 18 yards
- NYG – Tiki Barber – 13 rushes, 144 yards, 2 TD

**Top receivers**

- ARI – David Boston – 9 receptions, 128 yards, 2 TD
- NYG – Ike Hilliard – 3 receptions, 62 yards

On a stiflingly humid afternoon, the Giants began their 2000 campaign after a winless preseason with new uniforms on a new grass field for their 25th year at Giants Stadium against the Cardinals, who had swept the two-game series in 1999. Their second drive saw quarterback Kerry Collins complete third-down passes to wide receiver Ike Hilliard and fullback Greg Comella; then on the last play of the first quarter, the Giants took a 7–0 lead when running back Tiki Barber took a pitch from Collins to his right, saw no room to run, reversed back to the left, and outraced the pursuit for a 10-yard touchdown, diving to the pylon on the play.

New York's defense prevented Arizona from crossing midfield on their first four possessions, while Barber broke out for a 78-yard touchdown run, the longest run of his NFL career, to give them a 14–0 lead. Led by the arm and legs of quarterback Jake Plummer, the Cardinals finally mounted a drive into the red zone, but Plummer lost the snap on 4th-and-Inches, and new linebacker Micheal Barrow recovered. Chunk plays by Barber, Comella and tight end Dan Campbell put the Giants over midfield late in the first half, but Comella fumbled a pass away to Pro Bowl cornerback Aeneas Williams; consecutive passes from Plummer to wide receiver David Boston put the Cardinals back in field goal range. However, Arizona failed to capitalize when Plummer's pass for Frank Sanders was intercepted by defensive back Emmanuel McDaniel, who also picked off a Hail Mary heave on the last play of the half, preserving New York's halftime shutout.

Neither team picked up a first down in the third quarter until Plummer threw his third interception, this one to safety Shaun Williams, making his first NFL start. His 40-yard return and a 29-yard completion to Hilliard put the Giants at the 5-yard line; but on third down, Collins was picked off by safety Kwamie Lassiter. Unable to sustain the run, the Cardinals had Plummer—missing veteran receiver Rob Moore due to a torn anterior cruciate ligament—air out passes to Boston and Sanders, along with running back Michael Pittman; the 13-play, 79-yard drive resulted in a 32-yard Cary Blanchard field goal, cutting New York's lead to 14–3 heading into the fourth quarter.

The Giants confidently took time off the clock with their ground game, with Barber joined by their first-round rookie Ron Dayne as they drove 82 yards in 15 plays, with Dayne the reigning Heisman Trophy winner cashing in with a 7-yard touchdown rumble to extend New York to a 21–3 lead. Arizona mounted a late rally when Plummer—who threw for 318 yards on the day—completed 6-of-7 passes, including a touchdown pass to Boston, and then Mark Maddox recovered the ensuing onside kick before Plummer led them to another score on a throw to Boston with 32 seconds left; the two-point conversion failed, but the score was now 21–16. However, Blanchard's next onside try went out of bounds, securing a Week 1 win, New York's fourth straight under head coach Jim Fassel.

The game was delayed for 23 minutes in the third quarter by referee Bill Carollo due to thunderstorms in the surrounding area, forcing both teams to take shelter in their respective locker rooms.

Although it was a relatively unimpressive win for the Giants considering the close game against the eventually 3–13 Cardinals (who also finished last in DVOA for the 2000 season according to Football Outsiders), the Giants were 1–0. The game also introduced the football world to "Thunder and Lightning," the nickname given to the Dayne/Barber tandem. The lightning-fast Barber ran for a career-high 144 yards on just 13 carries, while the thunderously powerful Dayne rushed for 78 yards on 23 carries. After averaging only 88.3 rushing yards in 1999, the Giants as a team totaled 223 yards behind a revamped offensive line against Arizona's depleted defensive front.

==== Week 2: at Philadelphia Eagles ====
Week 2: New York Giants at Philadelphia Eagles – Game summary

Quarter	1	2	3	4	Total
**Giants**	3	17	7	6	**33**
Eagles	0	3	9	6	**18**

at Veterans Stadium, Philadelphia, Pennsylvania

- Date: September 10
- Game time: 1:00 p.m. EDT
- Game weather: Partly cloudy, 82 °F (28 °C)
- Game attendance: 65,530
- Referee: Ron Winter
- TV announcers (Fox): Sam Rosen, Bill Maas and Don Tollefson

Game information

**First quarter**

- NYG – Brad Daluiso 32-yard field goal, 4:05. Giants 3–0. **Drive: 10 plays, 50 yards, 4:14.**

**Second quarter**

- NYG – Brad Daluiso 36-yard field goal, 11:43. Giants 6–0. **Drive: 10 plays, 57 yards, 5:42.**
- PHI – David Akers 33-yard field goal, 5:22. Giants 6–3. **Drive: 7 plays, 34 yards, 2:52.**
- NYG – Amani Toomer 25-yard pass from Kerry Collins (Brad Daluiso kick), 1:00. Giants 13–3. **Drive: 8 plays, 55 yards, 4:22.**
- NYG – Tiki Barber 31-yard run (Brad Daluiso kick), 0:14. Giants 20–3. **Drive: 3 plays, 42 yards, 0:21.**

**Third quarter**

- PHI – David Akers 29-yard field goal, 9:09. Giants 20–6. **Drive: 10 plays, 49 yards, 5:51.**
- NYG – Ike Hilliard 30-yard pass from Kerry Collins (Brad Daluiso kick), 4:01. Giants 27–6. **Drive: 10 plays, 67 yards, 5:08.**
- PHI – Donovan McNabb 15-yard run (kick failed), 0:56. Giants 27–12. **Drive: 6 plays, 68 yards, 3:05.**

**Fourth quarter**

- NYG – Brad Daluiso 44-yard field goal, 8:40. Giants 30–12. **Drive: 11 plays, 28 yards, 7:16.**
- NYG – Brad Daluiso 23-yard field goal, 3:59. Giants 33–12. **Drive: 5 plays, 30 yards, 2:51.**
- PHI – Chad Lewis 7-yard pass from Donovan McNabb (pass failed), 1:22. Giants 33–18. **Drive: 8 plays, 64 yards, 2:37.**

**Top passers**

- NYG – Kerry Collins – 21/29, 220 yards, 2 TD
- PHI – Donovan McNabb – 19/33, 214 yards, TD

**Top rushers**

- NYG – Tiki Barber – 11 rushes, 96 yards, TD
- PHI – Donovan McNabb – 5 rushes, 45 yards, TD

**Top receivers**

- NYG – Ike Hilliard – 8 receptions, 84 yards, TD
- PHI – Chad Lewis – 4 receptions, 67 yards, TD

With the Giants coming off a win over the woeful Cardinals and the Eagles coming off a blowout win despite extreme heat in Dallas, the Eagles were favored on their home turf in this Week 2 matchup; however, the Giants continued their recent rivalry dominance with an impressive win.

They averted disaster on the third play from scrimmage when Kerry Collins had the ball stripped from behind by defensive end Hugh Douglas but recovered by wide receiver Amani Toomer. However, the drive stalled when right tackle Luke Petitgout was flagged for a false start on 4th-and-Inches from Philadelphia's 34-yard line. Their next possession saw Collins hit a screen pass to Tiki Barber for 20 yards and then drill a third-down strike to Ike Hilliard to set up a 32-yard Brad Daluiso field goal.

The Eagles struggled to get untracked, with running back Duce Staley, who had rushed for 201 yards the previous week, failing to find room to run. Their first three drives netted no first downs, while a 23-yard run on an inside draw by Barber led to another Daluiso field goal early in the second quarter. Quarterback Donovan McNabb finally sparked the Eagles with a 15-yard scramble and a 31-yard pass to tight end Chad Lewis to put them on New York's 4; but the Giants' aggressive defense—coached by defensive coordinator John Fox—led to a sack that forced Philadelphia to settle for a short David Akers field goal to make the score 6–3.

Akers's ensuing kickoff was muffed by rookie Ron Dixon, but he scooped it up and took it for a 43-yard return; Collins then completed a pass to Dixon for 15 yards on 3rd-and-10, and a 13-yard run by Ron Dayne set up 3rd-and-8 on the Eagles' 25. With Philadelphia bringing a blitz, Collins lofted a long pass to Toomer for a score, extending New York's lead to 13–3 with one minute left in the first half. The defense then forced a three-and-out, with linebacker Pete Monty blitzing and sacking McNabb on third down, and a poor punt by Sean Landeta set the Giants up on Philadelphia's 42. After two short passes gained 11 yards, Barber took the handoff on another inside draw, shifted left, cut around the blocks and raced 31 yards for a touchdown; the hostile Veterans Stadium crowd rained their team with boos as the visitors went into halftime with a 20–3 lead, having controlled the ball for over 22 minutes.

In the third quarter, Philadelphia abandoned the running game, with Staley rushing for only 11 yards, and McNabb completed six passes on their first drive; but on 3rd-and-1 from New York's 11, McNabb dropped back, was pressured by Michael Strahan and Jessie Armstead, and forced to throw it away. Akers came out for another short field goal; then Collins torched the Eagles' secondary with five straight completions, including a 30-yard strike down the seam to Hilliard for a score, giving the Giants their biggest lead at 27–6.

Needing to score quickly, McNabb completed a pair of passes to Staley which covered 26 yards, then hooked up twice with wide receivers Todd Pinkston and Charles Johnson before taking a quarterback draw 15 yards for an elusive touchdown; however, Akers's extra point was blocked by George Williams, keeping the score 27–12 late in the period.

Aided by a late hit on the kickoff by Stanley Pritchett, the Giants took over at their own 41; just like the previous week, they took time off the clock with their ground game, with Barber and Dayne picking up first downs, while Collins hit Hilliard for a third-down conversion. The drive eventually stalled, but Daluiso was good from 44 yards out, putting New York up 30–12. The Eagles picked up a first down with a deflected pass caught by center Bubba Miller, but they eventually faced fourth down short of midfield; McNabb was sacked by Armstead to quell their last hopes. Daluiso added another field goal and McNabb threw a late touchdown to Lewis, but Jason Sehorn recovered the onside kick to secure an efficient 33–18 win.

The win made Jim Fassel a perfect 7–0 against the Eagles in his head coaching career; Barber totaled 96 yards on only 11 carries, while their receiving duo of Toomer and Hilliard combined for 15 catches for 164 yards, as the Giants controlled the ball for 38:44 to win the coaching chess match between offensive coordinator Sean Payton and Philadelphia defensive coordinator Jim Johnson. The defense, meanwhile, allowed only 13 first downs by the Eagles, less than half what they earned in Week 1.

==== Week 3: at Chicago Bears ====
Week 3: New York Giants at Chicago Bears – Game summary

Quarter	1	2	3	4	Total
**Giants**	7	0	7	0	**14**
Bears	0	7	0	0	**7**

at Soldier Field, Chicago, Illinois

- Date: September 17
- Game time: 4:15 p.m. EDT/3:15 p.m. CDT
- Game weather: Mostly sunny, 79 °F (26 °C)
- Game attendance: 66,944
- Referee: Dick Hantak
- TV announcers (Fox): Pat Summerall, John Madden and D. J. Johnson

Game information

**First quarter**

- NYG – Ron Dixon 34-yard pass from Kerry Collins (Brad Daluiso kick), 10:38. Giants 7–0. **Drive: 8 plays, 80 yards, 4:22.**

**Second quarter**

- CHI – Eddie Kennison 2-yard pass from Cade McNown (Paul Edinger kick), 0:14. Tied 7–7. **Drive: 12 plays, 74 yards, 3:02.**

**Third quarter**

- NYG – Tiki Barber 3-yard run (Brad Daluiso kick), 5:26. Giants 14–7. **Drive: 6 plays, 43 yards, 2:50.**

**Fourth quarter**

- No scoring plays.

**Top passers**

- NYG – Kerry Collins – 24/33, 251 yards, TD
- CHI – Cade McNown – 23/36, 202 yards, TD

**Top rushers**

- NYG – Tiki Barber – 17 rushes, 86 yards, TD
- CHI – James Allen – 10 rushes, 31 yards

**Top receivers**

- NYG – Tiki Barber – 6 receptions, 58 yards
- CHI – Marcus Robinson – 9 receptions, 84 yards

The Giants next traveled to Chicago to take on the 0–2 Bears. They struck first with Kerry Collins hitting rookie wide receiver Ron Dixon for a 34-yard touchdown to make the score 7–0. Late in the first half, the Bears executed a two-minute drill with quarterback Cade McNown hitting Eddie Kennison for a touchdown with 14 seconds left in the half to tie the score at 7. In the third quarter, Tiki Barber ran in for a 3-yard touchdown, and the Giants defense held the rest of the way.

With this win, the Giants were 3–0 for the first time since 1993.

==== Week 4: vs. Washington Redskins ====
Week 4: Washington Redskins at New York Giants – Game summary

Quarter	1	2	3	4	Total
**Redskins**	0	10	6	0	**16**
Giants	0	0	0	6	**6**

at Giants Stadium, East Rutherford, New Jersey

- Date: September 24
- Game time: 8:30 p.m. EDT
- Game weather: Mostly cloudy, 64 °F (18 °C)
- Game attendance: 78,216
- Referee: Bernie Kukar
- TV announcers (ESPN): Mike Patrick, Joe Theismann, Paul Maguire and Solomon Wilcots

Game information

**First quarter**

- No scoring plays.

**Second quarter**

- WAS – Irving Fryar 23-yard pass from Brad Johnson (Michael Husted kick), 12:33. Redskins 7–0. **Drive: 7 plays, 92 yards, 3:16.**
- WAS – Michael Husted 25-yard field goal, 6:27. Redskins 10–0. **Drive: 6 plays, 58 yards, 3:30.**

**Third quarter**

- WAS – Andre Reed 21-yard pass from Brad Johnson (kick failed), 13:06. Redskins 16–0. **Drive: 4 plays, 81 yards, 1:54.**

**Fourth quarter**

- NYG – Ike Hilliard 7-yard pass from Kerry Collins (run failed), 2:25. Redskins 16–6. **Drive: 13 plays, 86 yards, 2:05.**

**Top passers**

- WAS – Brad Johnson – 14/20, 289 yards, 2 TD
- NYG – Kerry Collins – 21/44, 210 yards, TD, INT

**Top rushers**

- WAS – Stephen Davis – 30 rushes, 89 yards
- NYG – Tiki Barber – 16 rushes, 65 yards

**Top receivers**

- WAS – Albert Connell – 4 receptions, 122 yards
- NYG – Ike Hilliard – 7 receptions, 85 yards, TD

The Giants then traveled home to take on the Redskins in a Sunday Night game, their first primetime game of the season. Washington dominated for much of the game as many of their aging veterans made an impact. In the second quarter, Redskins quarterback Brad Johnson opened the scoring by hitting longtime Dolphin Irving Fryar for a 23-yard touchdown, and they led 10–0 at the half. In the third quarter, a Johnson touchdown pass to longtime Bill Andre Reed made the score 16–0. The Giants' only score came on a Kerry Collins touchdown pass to Ike Hilliard with less than 3 minutes remaining.

==== Week 5: at Tennessee Titans ====
Week 5: New York Giants at Tennessee Titans – Game summary

Quarter	1	2	3	4	Total
Giants	0	0	7	7	**14**
**Titans**	7	14	0	7	**28**

at Adelphia Coliseum, Nashville, Tennessee

- Date: October 1
- Game time: 1:00 p.m. EDT
- Game weather: Mostly cloudy, 75 °F (24 °C)
- Game attendance: 68,341
- Referee: Larry Nemmers
- TV announcers (Fox): Dick Stockton, Matt Millen and Pam Oliver

Game information

**First quarter**

- TEN – Frank Wycheck 14-yard pass from Steve McNair (Al Del Greco kick), 8:35. Titans 7–0. **Drive: 9 plays, 80 yards, 6:25.**

**Second quarter**

- TEN – Eddie George 7-yard run (Al Del Greco kick), 8:48. Titans 14–0. **Drive: 19 plays, 98 yards, 9:53.**
- TEN – Derrick Mason 29-yard pass from Steve McNair (Al Del Greco kick), 2:54. Titans 21–0. **Drive: 9 plays, 80 yards, 4:49.**

**Third quarter**

- NYG – Ike Hilliard 14-yard pass from Kerry Collins (Jaret Holmes kick), 5:25. Titans 21–7. **Drive: 5 plays, 82 yards, 2:10.**

**Fourth quarter**

- TEN – Frank Wycheck 3-yard pass from Steve McNair (Al Del Greco kick), 12:26. Titans 28–7. **Drive: 14 plays, 80 yards, 7:59.**
- NYG – Dan Campbell 1-yard pass from Kerry Collins (Jaret Holmes kick), 7:04. Titans 28–14. **Drive: 8 plays, 59 yards, 2:28.**

**Top passers**

- NYG – Kerry Collins – 17/36, 197 yards, 2 TD, 3 INT
- TEN – Steve McNair – 24/35, 293 yards, 3 TD

**Top rushers**

- NYG – Kerry Collins – 3 rushes, 19 yards
- TEN – Eddie George – 35 rushes, 125 yards, TD

**Top receivers**

- NYG – Amani Toomer – 5 receptions, 81 yards
- TEN – Derrick Mason – 6 receptions, 103 yards, TD

After their Sunday night loss, the Giants traveled to Nashville to take on the Titans. Heading into the game, the Titans were undefeated at 10–0 in Adelphia Coliseum, and would remain undefeated after this contest.

In the first quarter, Titans quarterback Steve McNair found tight end Frank Wycheck for a 14-yard touchdown to make the score 7–0. In the second quarter, running back Eddie George added a 7-yard rushing touchdown, then McNair hit receiver Derrick Mason in tight coverage for a 29-yard touchdown to make the score 21–0 Titans at the half. The Giants got on the board in the third quarter with Kerry Collins finding Ike Hilliard for a 14-yard touchdown. However, in the fourth quarter, McNair hit Frank Wycheck for his second touchdown of the day to make the score 28–7 and put the game out of reach.

The Giants were outgained 436-215 and were held to just 24 yards rushing. The "Thunder and Lightning" combo of Tiki Barber and Ron Dayne were held to just 1 combined yard on a combined 8 carries.

==== Week 6: at Atlanta Falcons ====
Week 6: New York Giants at Atlanta Falcons – Game summary

Quarter	1	2	3	4	Total
**Giants**	10	3	0	0	**13**
Falcons	0	3	3	0	**6**

at Georgia Dome, Atlanta, Georgia

- Date: October 8
- Game time: 4:05 p.m. EDT
- Game weather: None (indoor stadium)
- Game attendance: 50,947
- Referee: Johnny Grier
- TV announcers (Fox): Dick Stockton, Matt Millen and Pam Oliver

Game information

**First quarter**

- NYG – Ron Dayne 2-yard run (Jaret Holmes kick), 10:07. Giants 7–0. **Drive: 7 plays, 34 yards, 3:20.**
- NYG – Jaret Holmes 34-yard field goal, 0:08. Giants 10–0. **Drive: 9 plays, 52 yards, 4:39.**

**Second quarter**

- ATL – Morten Andersen 42-yard field goal, 5:25. Giants 10–3. **Drive: 7 plays, 18 yards, 2:13.**
- NYG – Jaret Holmes 27-yard field goal, 0:00. Giants 13–3. **Drive: 9 plays, 55 yards, 2:43.**

**Third quarter**

- ATL – Morten Andersen 28-yard field goal, 9:22. Giants 13–6. **Drive: 11 plays, 65 yards, 5:38.**

**Fourth quarter**

- No scoring plays.

**Top passers**

- NYG – Kerry Collins – 14/25, 151 yards, 2 INT
- ATL – Danny Kanell – 15/35, 166 yards, INT

**Top rushers**

- NYG – Tiki Barber – 14 rushes, 50 yards
- ATL – Jamal Anderson – 12 rushes, 12 yards

**Top receivers**

- NYG – Tiki Barber – 5 receptions, 50 yards
- ATL – Shawn Jefferson – 5 receptions, 72 yards

In the first quarter of this contest against the Falcons, Ron Dayne scored the game's only touchdown to make the score 7–0. With Chris Chandler injured early in the second quarter, former Giant Danny Kanell took over at QB in this contest. At the two-minute warning, a pass interference penalty by Giants cornerback Dave Thomas put the ball at the Giants' 10 with the Falcons needing a touchdown to tie the score. However, a sack by defensive end Michael Strahan and three incomplete passes by Kanell clinched the game for the Giants.

The Giants held the Falcons to just 13 yards rushing in this game.

==== Week 7: vs. Dallas Cowboys ====
Week 7: Dallas Cowboys at New York Giants – Game summary

Quarter	1	2	3	4	Total
Cowboys	0	0	14	0	**14**
**Giants**	0	7	6	6	**19**

at Giants Stadium, East Rutherford, New Jersey

- Date: October 15
- Game time: 1:00 p.m. EDT
- Game weather: Sunny, 75 °F (24 °C)
- Game attendance: 78,189
- Referee: Ron Winter
- TV announcers (Fox): Dick Stockton, Matt Millen and Pam Oliver

Game information

**First quarter**

- No scoring plays.

**Second quarter**

- NYG – Pete Mitchell 1-yard pass from Kerry Collins (Brad Daluiso kick), 6:42. Giants 7–0. **Drive: 5 plays, 21 yards, 1:40.**

**Third quarter**

- NYG – Brad Daluiso 24-yard field goal, 11:09. Giants 10–0. **Drive: 9 plays, 73 yards, 3:51.**
- DAL – Robert Thomas 1-yard pass from Troy Aikman (Tim Seder kick), 10:02. Giants 10–7. **Drive: 3 plays, 2 yards, 1:07.**
- NYG – Brad Daluiso 20-yard field goal, 6:13. Giants 13–7. **Drive: 8 plays, 62 yards, 3:49.**
- DAL – Emmitt Smith 3-yard run (Tim Seder kick), 1:19. Cowboys 14–13. **Drive: 8 plays, 61 yards, 4:54.**

**Fourth quarter**

- NYG – Ron Dayne 3-yard run (run failed), 10:00. Giants 19–14. **Drive: 7 plays, 31 yards, 3:16.**

**Top passers**

- DAL – Troy Aikman – 22/42, 211 yards, TD, 5 INT
- NYG – Kerry Collins – 14/25, 119 yards, TD

**Top rushers**

- DAL – Emmitt Smith – 19 rushes, 61 yards, TD
- NYG – Ron Dayne – 21 rushes, 108 yards, TD

**Top receivers**

- DAL – Chris Warren – 6 receptions, 62 yards
- NYG – Ike Hilliard – 3 receptions, 42 yards

While the Giants again didn't play great, Cowboys quarterback Troy Aikman was even worse with 5 interceptions in this Week 7 matchup against the Giants' archrival, the Cowboys.

On the first play from scrimmage, Troy Aikman went long for Raghib Ismail, and his pass was underthrown and intercepted by Jason Sehorn. Early in the second quarter with the game still scoreless, the Cowboys drove into the Giants' red zone, but safety Shaun Williams intercepted Aikman in the end zone to end the scoring threat. On the Cowboys' next drive, Dave Thomas intercepted Aikman on a slant play. Unlike the other picks, this one wasn't Aikman's fault as his intended receiver, James McKnight, slipped while running his route. The Giants finally capitalized on this miscue with Kerry Collins finding Pete Mitchell for a one-yard touchdown pass to finally open the scoring. With less than a minute left in the half, the Cowboys went for the bomb to Damon Hodge for a potential game-tying touchdown. While Hodge beat Giants corner Reggie Stephens down the field, Aikman's pass was again underthrown and Stephens was able to catch up and intercept the pass. The score was 7–0 Giants at halftime.

The Cowboys finally got on the board in the third quarter with Troy Aikman finding Robert Thomas for a 1-yard touchdown pass to make the score 10–7. After a Brad Daluiso field goal by the Giants, Cowboys running back Emmitt Smith ran for a 3-yard touchdown to make the score 14–13 Cowboys heading into the final quarter. However, with 13:16 left in the game, Aikman threw his fifth interception of the game, this one to linebacker Micheal Barrow. The Giants capitalized by scoring the go-ahead touchdown on a 3-yard Ron Dayne touchdown run.

==== Week 9: vs. Philadelphia Eagles ====
Week 9: Philadelphia Eagles at New York Giants – Game summary

Quarter	1	2	3	4	Total
Eagles	0	0	0	7	**7**
**Giants**	7	7	0	10	**24**

at Giants Stadium, East Rutherford, New Jersey

- Date: October 29
- Game time: 4:05 p.m. EST
- Game weather: Overcast, 43 °F (6 °C)
- Game attendance: 78,087
- Referee: Jeff Triplette
- TV announcers (Fox): Kenny Albert, Tim Green and Don Tollefson

Game information

**First quarter**

- NYG – Ron Dayne 1-yard run (Brad Daluiso kick), 6:04. Giants 7–0. **Drive: 5 plays, 74 yards, 3:02.**

**Second quarter**

- NYG – Amani Toomer 27-yard pass from Kerry Collins (Brad Daluiso kick), 1:31. Giants 14–0. **Drive: 3 plays, 32 yards, 0:19.**

**Third quarter**

- No scoring plays.

**Fourth quarter**

- NYG – Brad Daluiso 31-yard field goal, 13:06. Giants 17–0. **Drive: 12 plays, 48 yards, 6:15.**
- NYG – Joe Montgomery 4-yard run (Brad Daluiso kick), 5:56. Giants 24–0. **Drive: 11 plays, 54 yards, 6:50.**
- PHI – Charles Johnson 25-yard pass from Donovan McNabb (David Akers kick), 5:12. Giants 24–7. **Drive: 3 plays, 51 yards, 0:44.**

**Top passers**

- PHI – Donovan McNabb – 10/31, 129 yards, TD, INT
- NYG – Kerry Collins – 22/37, 253 yards, TD

**Top rushers**

- PHI – Donovan McNabb – 3 rushes, 42 yards
- NYG – Ron Dayne – 25 rushes, 93 yards, TD

**Top receivers**

- PHI – Chad Lewis – 1 reception, 26 yards
- NYG – Amani Toomer – 9 receptions, 108 yards, TD

The Giants dominated their second game against the Eagles for the season. In the first quarter, Ron Dayne ran in for a one-yard touchdown to make the score 7–0 Giants. The Giants added another touchdown in the second quarter with Kerry Collins hitting Amani Toomer for a 27-yard touchdown pass, and the Giants led 14–0 at the half. In the fourth quarter, reserve running back Joe Montgomery added his first touchdown of the season with a 4-yard touchdown to give the Giants a 24–0 lead.

The Giants outgained the Eagles 384–192. Amani Toomer caught 9 passes for 108 yards and a touchdown.

==== Week 10: at Cleveland Browns ====
Week 10: New York Giants at Cleveland Browns – Game summary

Quarter	1	2	3	4	Total
**Giants**	0	10	7	7	**24**
Browns	3	0	0	0	**3**

at Cleveland Browns Stadium, Cleveland, Ohio

- Date: November 5
- Game time: 1:00 p.m. EST
- Game weather: Sunny, 52 °F (11 °C)
- Game attendance: 72,718
- Referee: Tony Corrente
- TV announcers (Fox): Sam Rosen, Bill Maas and Mark Schroeder

Game information

**First quarter**

- CLE – Phil Dawson 19-yard field goal, 1:45. Browns 3–0. **Drive: 5 plays, 34 yards, 1:38.**

**Second quarter**

- NYG – Brad Daluiso 39-yard field goal, 11:19. Tied 3–3. **Drive: 12 plays, 49 yards, 5:26.**
- NYG – Ike Hilliard 28-yard pass from Kerry Collins (Brad Daluiso kick), 1:55. Giants 10–3. **Drive: 10 plays, 80 yards, 3:43.**

**Third quarter**

- NYG – Amani Toomer 17-yard pass from Kerry Collins (Brad Daluiso kick), 5:19. Giants 17–3. **Drive: 13 plays, 76 yards, 6:45.**

**Fourth quarter**

- NYG – Amani Toomer 32-yard pass from Kerry Collins (Brad Daluiso kick), 12:38. Giants 24–3. **Drive: 8 plays, 87 yards, 3:32.**

**Top passers**

- NYG – Kerry Collins – 19/31, 257 yards, 3 TD
- CLE – Doug Pederson – 17/29, 176 yards, INT

**Top rushers**

- NYG – Ron Dayne – 19 rushes, 64 yards
- CLE – Travis Prentice – 11 rushes, 15 yards

**Top receivers**

- NYG – Amani Toomer – 6 receptions, 100 yards, 2 TD
- CLE – Kevin Johnson – 5 receptions, 76 yards

With the Browns coming into the game with a 2–6 record having scored a combined 3 points in their previous 2 games, this matchup had all the makings of a blowout. However, it was the Browns who struck first, with kicker Phil Dawson kicking a 19-yard field goal to give the Browns a 3–0 lead at the end of the first quarter. In the second quarter, Kerry Collins found Ike Hilliard for a 28-yard touchdown pass, and the Giants led 10–3 at the half. In the second half, Collins hit Amani Toomer for two more touchdown passes, one from 17 yards and the other from 32 yards.

For the second straight week, the Giants held their opponent to under 200 yards of total offense while registering four sacks.

With this win, the Giants were 7–2 and in first place in the NFC East.

==== Week 11: vs. St. Louis Rams ====
Week 11: St. Louis Rams at New York Giants – Game summary

Quarter	1	2	3	4	Total
**Rams**	14	14	10	0	**38**
Giants	0	7	10	7	**24**

at Giants Stadium, East Rutherford, New Jersey

- Date: November 12
- Game time: 4:15 p.m. EST
- Game weather: Partly cloudy, 52 °F (11 °C)
- Game attendance: 78,174
- Referee: Bernie Kukar
- TV announcers (Fox): Pat Summerall, John Madden and D. J. Johnson

Game information

**First quarter**

- STL – Roland Williams 1-yard pass from Trent Green (Jeff Wilkins kick), 10:33. Rams 7–0. **Drive: 1 play, 1 yards, 0:05.**
- STL – Torry Holt 5-yard pass from Trent Green (Jeff Hall kick), 1:55. Rams 14–0. **Drive: 3 plays, 27 yards, 1:27.**

**Second quarter**

- NYG – Tiki Barber 13-yard pass from Kerry Collins (Brad Daluiso kick), 12:42. Rams 14–7. **Drive: 3 plays, 66 yards, 1:19.**
- STL – Ricky Proehl 8-yard pass from Trent Green (Jeff Hall kick), 5:43. Rams 21–7. **Drive: 12 plays, 71 yards, 6:59.**
- STL – Trent Green 18-yard run (Jeff Hall kick), 2:41. Rams 28–7. **Drive: 5 plays, 63 yards, 2:05.**

**Third quarter**

- NYG – Ike Hilliard 46-yard pass from Kerry Collins (Brad Daluiso kick), 13:58. Rams 28–14. **Drive: 3 plays, 47 yards, 1:02.**
- NYG – Brad Daluiso 20-yard field goal, 11:34. Rams 28–17. **Drive: 4 plays, 8 yards, 2:07.**
- STL – Jeff Hall 50-yard field goal, 7:20. Rams 31–17. **Drive: 9 plays, 41 yards, 4:14.**
- STL – Isaac Bruce 34-yard pass from Trent Green (Jeff Hall kick), 2:24. Rams 38–17. **Drive: 4 plays, 59 yards, 1:39.**

**Fourth quarter**

- NYG – Ike Hilliard 34-yard pass from Kerry Collins (Brad Daluiso kick), 8:26. Rams 38–24. **Drive: 8 plays, 92 yards, 2:16.**

**Top passers**

- STL – Trent Green – 27/45, 272 yards, 4 TD, INT
- NYG – Kerry Collins – 17/34, 240 yards, 3 TD, 2 INT

**Top rushers**

- STL – Justin Watson – 17 rushes, 62 yards
- NYG – Ron Dayne – 9 rushes, 66 yards

**Top receivers**

- STL – Torry Holt – 8 receptions, 86 yards, TD
- NYG – Ike Hilliard – 5 receptions, 110 yards, 2 TD

The Giants headed home next to take on the Rams, who were also 7–2 heading into the matchup. The Rams were playing without starting quarterback Kurt Warner and running back Marshall Faulk, however backup quarterback Trent Green lit up the Giants for 4 touchdown passes and a rushing touchdown as the Giants' 4 game winning streak came to an end.

In the first quarter, Amani Toomer lost a fumble deep in Giants territory, and the ball was recovered by Rams cornerback Dexter McCleon, who went down at the 1 yard line. On the next play, Trent Green found tight end Roland Williams for the game's opening score. Later in the quarter, Green hit Torry Holt for a 5-yard touchdown to make the score 14–0 Rams at the end of the first quarter. Although the Giants got on the board in the second quarter with Kerry Collins hitting Tiki Barber for a 13-yard touchdown, but Green struck back, hitting Ricky Proehl for an 8-yard touchdown pass. After Collins was picked off by McCleon, Green ran for a 14-yard touchdown run to make the score 28–7 Rams at the half. In the third quarter, Green's fifth touchdown of the day, a 34-yard touchdown pass to Isaac Bruce, made the score 38–17 Rams heading into the fourth quarter.

==== Week 12: vs. Detroit Lions ====
Week 12: Detroit Lions at New York Giants – Game summary

Quarter	1	2	3	4	Total
**Lions**	0	21	7	3	**31**
Giants	0	0	14	7	**21**

at Giants Stadium, East Rutherford, New Jersey

- Date: November 19
- Game time: 1:00 p.m. EST
- Game weather: Cloudy, 43 °F (6 °C)
- Game attendance: 77,897
- Referee: Bill Carollo
- TV announcers (Fox): Dick Stockton, Matt Millen and Pam Oliver

Game information

**First quarter**

- No scoring plays.

**Second quarter**

- DET – Walter Rasby 5-yard pass from Charlie Batch (Jason Hanson kick), 14:12. Lions 7–0. **Drive: 13 plays, 71 yards, 5:50.**
- DET – James Stewart 1-yard run (Jason Hanson kick), 9:22. Lions 14–0. **Drive: 6 plays, 28 yards, 2:58.**
- DET – Herman Moore 7-yard pass from Charlie Batch (Jason Hanson kick), 0:25. Lions 21–0. **Drive: 3 plays, 8 yards, 0:17.**

**Third quarter**

- DET – Johnnie Morton 32-yard pass from Charlie Batch (Jason Hanson kick), 11:34. Lions 28–0. **Drive: 4 plays, 65 yards, 2:03.**
- NYG – Kerry Collins 4-yard run (Brad Daluiso kick), 7:14. Lions 28–7. **Drive: 9 plays, 71 yards, 4:20.**
- NYG – Dan Campbell 2-yard pass from Kerry Collins (Brad Daluiso kick), 0:22. Lions 28–14. **Drive: 8 plays, 50 yards, 2:59.**

**Fourth quarter**

- DET – Jason Hanson 19-yard field goal, 7:38. Lions 31–14. **Drive: 14 plays, 61 yards, 7:44.**
- NYG – Joe Jurevicius 13-yard pass from Kerry Collins (Brad Daluiso kick), 1:47. Lions 31–21. **Drive: 17 plays, 80 yards, 3:39.**

**Top passers**

- DET – Charlie Batch – 20/32, 225 yards, 3 TD, INT
- NYG – Kerry Collins – 29/51, 350 yards, 2 TD, INT

**Top rushers**

- DET – James Stewart – 22 rushes, 52 yards, TD
- NYG – Tiki Barber – 8 rushes, 30 yards

**Top receivers**

- DET – Johnnie Morton – 6 receptions, 78 yards, TD
- NYG – Amani Toomer – 8 receptions, 108 yards

Without a doubt, the low point of the Giants' season was their Week 12 loss to the Detroit Lions, a game that was nowhere close to being as competitive as the final score indicated.

After a scoreless first quarter, the second quarter was a Lions onslaught. Lions quarterback Charlie Batch found tight end Walter Rasby for a 5-yard touchdown to make the score 7–0. After kick returner Desmond Howard returned the punt on the Giants' ensuing drive 50 yards, running back James Stewart ran in for a one-yard touchdown plunge to make the score 14–0 Lions. With less than 50 seconds to go in the half, punter Brad Maynard's punt was blocked, and the Lions capitalized with Batch finding veteran receiver Herman Moore for a 6-yard touchdown to make the score 21–0 Detroit at the half. Even when the Giants appeared to make good plays, they were stymied by a penalty or turnover. In the quarter, Tiki Barber returned a punt 67 yards in order to give the Giants great field position, but the play was called back due to a holding penalty by Bashir Levingston. Later in the quarter, Levingston fumbled a kickoff return. Head coach Jim Fassel was so enraged by Levingston's poor play that he cut him just one day after the game, making this his final NFL game.

In the third quarter, Charlie Batch hit receiver Johnnie Morton, who outran Jason Sehorn to the end zone for a 32-yard touchdown to make it 28–0. As if being outrun for the touchdown wasn't enough, Sehorn's pants were falling down on the play. While the Giants did score three touchdowns later in the game, no one was fooled as the game had long been decided.

While the Giants were still 7–4 and a half-game behind the division lead, many critics began to relentlessly attack the team for their poor performance (particularly regarding this game), and questioned whether or not they had the ability to even make the playoffs after a 7–2 start. The loss also put Jim Fassel on an even hotter seat, as he needed to get his team to the playoffs in order to save his job in the final year of his contract.

==== Week 13: at Arizona Cardinals ====
Week 13: New York Giants at Arizona Cardinals – Game summary

Quarter	1	2	3	4	Total
**Giants**	7	7	7	10	**31**
Cardinals	0	0	7	0	**7**

at Sun Devil Stadium, Tempe, Arizona

- Date: November 26
- Game time: 8:30 p.m. EST
- Game weather: Partly cloudy, 62 °F (17 °C)
- Game attendance: 42,094
- Referee: Walt Coleman
- TV announcers (ESPN): Mike Patrick, Joe Theismann, Paul Maguire and Solomon Wilcots

Game information

**First quarter**

- NYG – Dan Campbell 5-yard pass from Kerry Collins (Brad Daluiso kick), 9:32. Giants 7–0. **Drive: 9 plays, 65 yards, 4:21.**

**Second quarter**

- NYG – Ron Dayne 1-yard run (Brad Daluiso kick), 10:15. Giants 14–0. **Drive: 11 plays, 72 yards, 5:32.**

**Third quarter**

- NYG – Tiki Barber 23-yard run (Brad Daluiso kick), 6:24. Giants 21–0. **Drive: 7 plays, 68 yards, 2:50.**
- ARI – Michael Pittman 36-yard pass from Dave Brown (Cary Blanchard kick), 2:01. Giants 21–7. **Drive: 9 plays, 88 yards, 4:23.**

**Fourth quarter**

- NYG – Amani Toomer 19-yard run (Brad Daluiso kick), 10:06. Giants 28–7. **Drive: 12 plays, 80 yards, 6:55.**
- NYG – Brad Daluiso 25-yard field goal, 6:49. Giants 31–7. **Drive: 7 plays, 44 yards, 2:58.**

**Top passers**

- NYG – Kerry Collins – 20/30, 232 yards, TD
- ARI – Dave Brown – 18/36, 192 yards, TD, INT

**Top rushers**

- NYG – Ron Dayne – 24 rushes, 85 yards, TD
- ARI – Michael Pittman – 13 rushes, 77 yards

**Top receivers**

- NYG – Joe Jurevicius – 5 receptions, 71 yards
- ARI – Michael Pittman – 10 receptions, 96 yards, TD

The first game for the Giants after Jim Fassel's guarantee was this Sunday night clash against the Arizona Cardinals, who were playing with backup quarterback Dave Brown starting in place of the injured Jake Plummer.

After two straight poor performances, the Giants dominated the entire game. In the first quarter, Kerry Collins found Dan Campbell for a 5-yard touchdown to open the scoring. A Ron Dayne touchdown made the score 14–0 Giants at the half. In the second half Tiki Barber also added a touchdown with a 23-yard run, and even wide receiver Amani Toomer scored a rushing touchdown on a 19-yard reverse.

Defensive tackle Keith Hamilton had a particularly outstanding day for the Giants with 3 sacks.

==== Week 14: at Washington Redskins ====
Week 14: New York Giants at Washington Redskins – Game summary

Quarter	1	2	3	4	Total
**Giants**	0	6	3	0	**9**
Redskins	0	0	0	7	**7**

at Fedex Field, Landover, Maryland

- Date: December 3
- Game time: 1:00 p.m. EST
- Game weather: Mostly cloudy, 28 °F (−2 °C)
- Game attendance: 83,485
- Referee: Ed Hochuli
- TV announcers (Fox): Pat Summerall, John Madden and D. J. Johnson

Game information

**First quarter**

- No scoring plays.

**Second quarter**

- NYG – Brad Daluiso 46-yard field goal, 3:32. Giants 3–0. **Drive: 7 plays, 18 yards, 2:59.**
- NYG – Brad Daluiso 27-yard field goal, 0:04. Giants 6–0. **Drive: 7 plays, 44 yards, 2:53.**

**Third quarter**

- NYG – Brad Daluiso 28-yard field goal, 6:18. Giants 9–0. **Drive: 7 plays, 21 yards, 3:47.**

**Fourth quarter**

- WAS – Irving Fryar 5-yard pass from Jeff George (Eddie Murray kick), 4:48. Giants 9–7. **Drive: 10 plays, 97 yards, 3:14.**

**Top passers**

- NYG – Kerry Collins – 18/29, 164 yards, INT
- WAS – Jeff George – 10/18, 143 yards, TD

**Top rushers**

- NYG – Tiki Barber – 14 rushes, 82 yards
- WAS – Stephen Davis – 12 rushes, 29 yards

**Top receivers**

- NYG – Joe Jurevicius – 6 receptions, 83 yards
- WAS – James Thrash – 4 receptions, 73 yards

The Giants then went to Maryland to take on the Redskins in a game with huge playoff implications for both teams. While the Giants were trying to keep pace with the division-leading Eagles, Washington was in a must-win situation. After a 6–2 start, they had lost 3 of their previous 4 games, including a close loss to the Eagles at home after kicker Eddie Murray had missed a potential game-tying field goal.

A very evenly matched game ensued. The Giants led 6–0 at halftime after Brad Daluiso kicked two field goals in the second quarter. In the third quarter, Daluiso added another field goal to make the score 9–0 heading into the final quarter. After Washington quarterback Brad Johnson was intercepted twice in the second half with his second interception being thrown to Giants corner Emmanuel McDaniel with 12:22 remaining, Johnson was benched and replaced with Jeff George, one of owner Daniel Snyder's high-priced free-agent acquisitions in the offseason. George started by leading a 97-yard drive, capped off by a touchdown pass to Irving Fryar to narrow the score to 9–7. The Giants got the ball back and attempted to run out the clock, but the Redskins' defense shut down the Giants' running game and forced them to punt. The situation appeared to look bleak for the Giants as George led the Redskins to the Giants' 35 yard line, near position for a game-winning field goal with 1:26 to go. With the aid of an overturned non-catch by James Thrash, the Giants finally held, forcing a 4th down with 56 seconds left. Washington called their final timeout and sent out 44-year old Eddie Murray to attempt a game-winning field goal, but his attempt was short and not even close to reaching the crossbar.

This loss played a key role in the Redskins' failing to reach the postseason despite a 6–2 start and considerable preseason hype regarding their free-agent signings. The next day, Dan Snyder fired head coach Norv Turner and named Terry Robiskie the interim head coach, ushering in a five-year stretch where the team would have five head coaches in five years.

On the other hand, the Giants were now at 9–4 and in first place in the NFC East due to the Eagles' loss to the Titans.

==== Week 15: vs. Pittsburgh Steelers ====
Week 15: Pittsburgh Steelers at New York Giants – Game summary

Quarter	1	2	3	4	Total
Steelers	0	3	0	7	**10**
**Giants**	3	10	7	10	**30**

at Giants Stadium, East Rutherford, New Jersey

- Date: December 10
- Game time: 1:00 p.m. EST
- Game weather: Mostly cloudy, 39 °F (4 °C)
- Game attendance: 78,164
- Referee: Tony Corrente
- TV announcers (CBS): Greg Gumbel, Phil Simms and Armen Keteyian

Game information

**First quarter**

- NYG – Brad Daluiso 38-yard field goal, 12:52. Giants 3–0. **Drive: 5 plays, 20 yards, 2:06.**

**Second quarter**

- NYG – Brad Daluiso 40-yard field goal, 14:47. Giants 6–0. **Drive: 5 plays, 10 yards, 2:19.**
- NYG – Tiki Barber 3-yard run (Brad Daluiso kick), 8:27. Giants 13–0. **Drive: 9 plays, 60 yards, 4:32.**
- PIT – Kris Brown 32-yard field goal, 0:35. Giants 13–3. **Drive: 6 plays, 58 yards, 2:56.**

**Third quarter**

- NYG – Ike Hilliard 9-yard pass from Kerry Collins (Brad Daluiso kick), 5:24. Giants 20–3. **Drive: 10 plays, 74 yards, 4:46.**

**Fourth quarter**

- NYG – Brad Daluiso 21-yard field goal, 13:27. Giants 23–3. **Drive: 6 plays, 61 yards, 2:55.**
- NYG – Amani Toomer 2-yard pass from Kerry Collins (Brad Daluiso kick), 2:34. Giants 30–3. **Drive: 11 plays, 80 yards, 6:44.**
- PIT – Bobby Shaw 5-yard pass from Kordell Stewart (Kris Brown kick), 1:04. Giants 30–10. **Drive: 6 plays, 54 yards, 1:30.**

**Top passers**

- PIT – Kordell Stewart – 20/34, 224 yards, TD, INT
- NYG – Kerry Collins – 24/35, 333 yards, 2 TD

**Top rushers**

- PIT – Jerome Bettis – 17 rushes, 39 yards
- NYG – Tiki Barber – 12 rushes, 22 yards, TD

**Top receivers**

- PIT – Bobby Shaw – 6 receptions, 88 yards, TD
- NYG – Amani Toomer – 9 receptions, 136 yards, TD

The Giants returned home after their big win over Washington and blew out the Steelers in a game that could have been even worse than the final score indicated.

The Giants took a 6–0 lead early in the game. During one of the field goal-scoring drives, Kerry Collins appeared to throw a touchdown to Ike Hilliard (back in the lineup after being injured in the Detroit game), but the refs correctly ruled that Hilliard had been out of bounds before he made the catch. Later in the second quarter, in a role reversal, the Giants used Tiki Barber at the goal line rather than Ron Dayne, and he went inside for a 3-yard touchdown to make the score 13–3 at the half.

Ike Hilliard eventually did get in the end zone with a 9-yard touchdown pass from Kerry Collins, and the score was 20–3 Giants. On the last play of the third quarter, Collins found Hilliard again, and he cut to the middle of the field appearing to be off for a 66-yard touchdown, but Steelers safety Ainsley Battles somehow made the tackle at the 7 yard line after being blocked by fullback Greg Comella, and the Giants settled for a field goal to make it 23–3 early in the fourth quarter. With one more chance to stay in the game due to Battles's touchdown-saving tackle, the Steelers drove to the Giants' 2 yard line, but defensive tackle Cedric Jones sacked Steelers quarterback Kordell Stewart on 3rd down, then on 4th down Stewart was intercepted by Reggie Stephens to effectively end any hope the Steelers had. Collins then drove the Giants down the field and threw an insurance touchdown to Amani Toomer to make the score 30–3 with less than 3 minutes remaining.

Kerry Collins went 24 of 35 for 333 yards and 3 touchdowns, while Amani Toomer added 9 receptions for 136 yards and a touchdown. The Giants defense held the Steelers to 47 yards rushing.

==== Week 16: at Dallas Cowboys ====
Week 16: New York Giants at Dallas Cowboys – Game summary

Quarter	1	2	3	4	Total
**Giants**	0	0	7	10	**17**
Cowboys	7	6	0	0	**13**

at Texas Stadium, Irving, Texas

- Date: December 17
- Game time: 8:30 p.m. EST/7:30 p.m. CST
- Game weather: Clear, 42 °F (6 °C)
- Game attendance: 61,311
- Referee: Tom White
- TV announcers (ESPN): Mike Patrick, Joe Theismann, Paul Maguire and Solomon Wilcots

Game information

**First quarter**

- DAL – Emmitt Smith 1-yard run (Tim Seder kick), 4:20. Cowboys 7–0. **Drive: 8 plays, 65 yards, 4:36.**

**Second quarter**

- DAL – Tim Seder 47-yard field goal, 12:37. Cowboys 10–0. **Drive: 10 plays, 41 yards, 4:57.**
- DAL – Tim Seder 43-yard field goal, 2:16. Cowboys 13–0. **Drive: 6 plays, 18 yards, 3:17.**

**Third quarter**

- NYG – Amani Toomer 33-yard pass from Kerry Collins (Brad Daluiso kick), 2:29. Cowboys 13–7. **Drive: 5 plays, 48 yards, 2:03.**

**Fourth quarter**

- NYG – Tiki Barber 13-yard run (Brad Daluiso kick), 8:15. Giants 14–13. **Drive: 1 play, 13 yards, 0:08.**
- NYG – Brad Daluiso 44-yard field goal, 1:49. Giants 17–13. **Drive: 8 plays, 30 yards, 4:27.**

**Top passers**

- NYG – Kerry Collins – 12/26, 140 yards, TD, INT
- DAL – Anthony Wright – 13/25, 119 yards, INT

**Top rushers**

- NYG – Tiki Barber – 20 rushes, 80 yards, TD
- DAL – Emmitt Smith – 24 rushes, 46 yards, TD

**Top receivers**

- NYG – Amani Toomer – 3 receptions, 58 yards, TD
- DAL – James McKnight – 2 receptions, 45 yards

The Giants were expected to win easily in this Sunday night matchup with the Cowboys, but instead the game turned into a hard-fought victory.

To the surprise of many, the first half was all Cowboys. Emmitt Smith ran in for a 1-yard touchdown to make it 7–0 Cowboys, then Cowboys kicker Tim Seder added two field goals to make the score 13–0 Dallas at the half. But the Giants turned the tables in the second half. In the third quarter, Kerry Collins threw a 33-yard touchdown pass to Amani Toomer to make the score 13–7. Then in the fourth quarter, an interception by Emmanuel McDaniel set up a Tiki Barber 13-yard touchdown to give the Giants their first lead of the day, 14–13. With less than 2 minutes remaining, a fourth-down stop by Micheal Barrow effectively ended the Cowboys' chance for an upset win.

The Giants held the Cowboys to just 145 yards of total offense with Michael Strahan registering 2.5 sacks.

This win clinched the division for the Giants, who were 11–4 and held the tiebreaker over the 10–5 Eagles due to having swept them on the season. As a result, coach Jim Fassel's guarantee had been validated.

==== Week 17: vs. Jacksonville Jaguars ====
Week 17: Jacksonville Jaguars at New York Giants – Game summary

Quarter	1	2	3	4	Total
Jaguars	0	7	3	15	**25**
**Giants**	7	0	0	21	**28**

at Giants Stadium, East Rutherford, New Jersey

- Date: December 23
- Game time: 12:30 p.m. EST
- Game weather: Cloudy, 28 °F (−2 °C)
- Game attendance: 77,924
- Referee: Dick Hantak
- TV announcers (CBS): Greg Gumbel, Phil Simms, Armen Keteyian and Bonnie Bernstein

Game information

**First quarter**

- NYG – Tiki Barber 3-yard run (Brad Daluiso kick), 0:45. Giants 7–0. **Drive: 12 plays, 58 yards, 5:42.**

**Second quarter**

- JAC – Fred Taylor 44-yard run (Mike Hollis kick), 13:23. Tied 7–7. **Drive: 7 plays, 74 yards, 2:22.**

**Third quarter**

- JAC – Mike Hollis 36-yard field goal, 13:19. Jaguars 10–7. **Drive: 4 plays, 5 yards, 1:26.**

**Fourth quarter**

- NYG – Ike Hilliard 5-yard pass from Kerry Collins (Brad Daluiso kick), 11:11. Giants 14–10. **Drive: 7 plays, 75 yards, 2:49.**
- NYG – Amani Toomer 54-yard pass from Kerry Collins (Brad Daluiso kick), 3:05. Giants 21–10. **Drive: 2 plays, 55 yards, 0:19.**
- JAC – Kyle Brady 5-yard pass from Mark Brunell (Brunell-Brady pass), 1:56. Giants 21–18. **Drive: 3 plays, 61 yards, 1:09.**
- NYG – Jason Sehorn 38-yard kickoff return (Brad Daluiso kick), 1:51. Giants 28–18.
- JAC – Alvis Whitted 12-yard pass from Mark Brunell (Mike Hollis kick), 0:19. Giants 28–25. **Drive: 6 plays, 51 yards, 1:32.**

**Top passers**

- JAC – Mark Brunell – 23/41, 262 yards, 2 TD, INT
- NYG – Kerry Collins – 22/39, 321 yards, 2 TD, INT

**Top rushers**

- JAC – Fred Taylor – 13 rushes, 52 yards, TD
- NYG – Tiki Barber – 24 rushes, 78 yards, TD

**Top receivers**

- JAC – Keenan McCardell – 11 receptions, 131 yards
- NYG – Amani Toomer – 8 receptions, 193 yards, TD

With the Giants holding the tiebreaker over the Vikings due to better divisional record, a win in their Week 17 game against future coach Tom Coughlin's Jaguars on a Saturday afternoon would clinch home-field advantage throughout the NFC playoffs.

The game started relatively slowly. At the end of three quarters the Jaguars led 10–7. Tiki Barber had run for the opening score to make it 7–0 Giants, but the Jaguars answered with running back Fred Taylor rushing for a 44-yard touchdown. However, in the fourth quarter, a defensive battle turned into a shootout. With 11:11 to go, Kerry Collins found Ike Hilliard for a 5-yard touchdown pass that allowed the Giants to regain the lead, 14–10. Later in the quarter, Collins hit Amani Toomer for a 54-yard touchdown to make the score 21–10 with 3:05 to go and seemingly clinch the game. However, the Jaguars were not done. Jaguars quarterback Mark Brunell drove the Jags down the field and threw a touchdown pass to tight end Kyle Brady with 1:56 to go, and the two-point conversion made the score 21–18. Because they needed another score, the Jaguars attempted an onside kick, but it backfired as Jason Sehorn recovered the ball before it went 10 yards and returned it 38 yards for a touchdown to make it 28–18. Needing two scores again, Brunell drove the Jags for another touchdown, this one to Alvis Whitted, to make the score 28–25 with just 19 seconds remaining. Jags kicker Mike Hollis attempted another onside kick, which was recovered again by Sehorn.

Kerry Collins was 22 of 39 for 321 yards and 2 touchdowns, with 1 interception. Amani Toomer had an outstanding day, catching 8 balls for 193 yards and a touchdown.

With this win, the Giants earned home-field advantage and a first round bye.

=== Standings ===
NFC East
	W	L	T	PCT	PF	PA	STK
^{(1)} New York Giants	12	4	0	.750	328	246	W5
^{(4)} Philadelphia Eagles	11	5	0	.688	351	245	W2
Washington Redskins	8	8	0	.500	281	269	W1
Dallas Cowboys	5	11	0	.313	294	361	L2
Arizona Cardinals	3	13	0	.188	210	443	L7

== Postseason ==
Round	Date	Opponent	Result	Record	Venue	Recap
Wild Card	Bye					
Divisional	January 7	Philadelphia Eagles (4)	W 20–10	1–0	Giants Stadium	Recap
NFC Championship	January 14	Minnesota Vikings (2)	W 41–0	2–0	Giants Stadium	Recap
Super Bowl XXXV	January 28	Baltimore Ravens (A4)	L 7–34	2–1	Raymond James Stadium	Recap

In the divisional playoffs, the Giants defeated MVP runner-up Donovan McNabb and the Philadelphia Eagles 20–10, in which rookie WR Ron Dixon returned the opening kickoff for a touchdown, and Jason Sehorn intercepted a McNabb pass for a touchdown. The win was the third by the Giants over the Eagles for the season.

In the NFC Championship against the favored Minnesota Vikings, Kerry Collins threw five TDs (including two to Ike Hilliard) as they progressed to the franchise's 3rd Super Bowl by demolishing Minnesota 41–0. Combined with the Giants only other NFC championship game played at home (1986), the Giants have outscored their two opponents 58–0 in home NFC championship games.

In the Super Bowl, playing against arguably the greatest defense in history, the Giants were dominated and lost Super Bowl XXXV 34–7 against the Baltimore Ravens. Kerry Collins threw four interceptions, including one that was returned for a TD; the Giants scored their only touchdown with a Ron Dixon 97-yd second-half kickoff return. It was the Giants' only Super Bowl loss.

=== Game summaries ===
==== NFC Divisional Round: vs. (4) Philadelphia Eagles ====
NFC Divisional Round: (4) Philadelphia Eagles at (1) New York Giants – Game summary

Quarter	1	2	3	4	Total
Eagles	0	3	0	7	10
Giants	7	10	0	3	20

at Giants Stadium, East Rutherford, New Jersey

- Date: January 7
- Game time: 4:15 p.m. EST
- Game weather: Clear, 39 °F (4 °C)
- Game attendance: 78,765
- Referee: Ed Hochuli
- TV announcers (Fox): Pat Summerall, John Madden and D. J. Johnson

Game information

First quarter

- NYG – Ron Dixon 97-yard kickoff return (Brad Daluiso kick), 14:43. Giants 7–0.

Second quarter

- NYG – Brad Daluiso 37-yard field goal, 14:55. Giants 10–0. Drive: 6 plays, 14 yards, 2:19.
- NYG – Jason Sehorn 32-yard interception return (Brad Daluiso kick), 1:40. Giants 17–0.
- PHI – David Akers 28-yard field goal, 0:26. Giants 17–3. Drive: 7 plays, 40 yards, 1:14.

Third quarter

- No scoring plays.

Fourth quarter

- NYG – Brad Daluiso 25-yard field goal, 8:41. Giants 20–3. Drive: 13 plays, 88 yards, 8:11.
- PHI – Torrance Small 10-yard pass from Donovan McNabb (David Akers kick), 1:56. Giants 20–10 Drive: 3 plays, 8 yards, 0:25.

Top passers

- PHI – Donovan McNabb – 20/41, 181 yards, TD, INT
- NYG – Kerry Collins – 12/19, 125 yards

Top rushers

- PHI – Brian Mitchell – 3 rushes, 18 yards
- NYG – Ron Dayne – 17 rushes, 53 yards

Top receivers

- PHI – Charles Johnson – 5 receptions, 53 yards
- NYG – Pete Mitchell – 2 receptions, 47 yards

After a first-round bye, the Giants hosted the Eagles in the divisional round, with the winner taking on the Vikings in the NFC Championship. The pressure was on the Giants in this one. While the Giants had swept the Eagles in the regular season, the Eagles had finished 6–1 after their second loss, and had just dominated the Bucs in the first round. In a largely ugly game where both teams committed three turnovers apiece, two big plays by the Giants would be the difference.

The Giants won the toss and elected to receive. Ron Dixon fielded the opening kickoff and blew past the entire Eagles coverage unit untouched for a 97-yard kickoff return touchdown. On the first play of the second quarter, Brad Daluiso's field goal made the score 10–0 Giants. Late in the second quarter, the Eagles had the ball deep in their own territory, attempting to begin a two-minute drill to change the game. Donovan McNabb dropped back and threw an out pattern to receiver Torrance Small when Jason Sehorn jumped in front of the pass and broke it up. While he dove, the ball stayed in the air, and Sehorn got back up and intercepted the pass, returning it 32 yards for a touchdown. A field goal by David Akers made the score 17–3 Giants at the half.

Hardly any notable plays occurred in the second half as both teams struggled to move the ball. The Eagles scored their only touchdown late in the game, when the Eagles blocked a punt to set up a 10-yard touchdown pass from Donovan McNabb to Torrance Small with 1:56 left. But the game had long been decided by this point.

The Giants held the Eagles to just 186 yards of total offense. Donovan McNabb, who had finished second in MVP voting for the 2000 season, was held to completing less than half his pass attempts (20–41) and just 17 yards rushing. Michael Strahan led the defense with 2 sacks as the defense sacked McNabb 6 times.

==== NFC Championship: vs. (2) Minnesota Vikings ====
NFC Championship: (2) Minnesota Vikings at (1) New York Giants – Game summary

Quarter	1	2	3	4	Total
Vikings	0	0	0	0	0
Giants	14	20	7	0	41

at Giants Stadium, East Rutherford, New Jersey

- Date: January 14
- Game time: 12:30 p.m. EST
- Game weather: Haze, 39 °F (4 °C)
- Game attendance: 79,310
- Referee: Tony Corrente
- TV announcers (Fox): Pat Summerall, John Madden, D. J. Johnson and Pam Oliver

Game information

First quarter

- NYG – Ike Hilliard 46-yard pass from Kerry Collins (Brad Daluiso kick), 13:03. Giants 7–0. Drive: 4 plays, 74 yards, 1:57.
- NYG – Greg Comella 18-yard pass from Kerry Collins (Brad Daluiso kick), 12:47. Giants 14–0. Drive: 1 play, 18 yards, 0:06.

Second quarter

- NYG – Brad Daluiso 21-yard field goal, 14:56. Giants 17–0. Drive: 6 plays, 37 yards, 3:10.
- NYG – Joe Jurevicius 8-yard pass from Kerry Collins (Brad Daluiso kick), 10:24. Giants 24–0. Drive: 5 plays, 71 yards, 2:42.
- NYG – Brad Daluiso 22-yard field goal, 5:22. Giants 27–0. Drive: 10 plays, 62 yards, 3:27.
- NYG – Ike Hilliard 7-yard pass from Kerry Collins (Brad Daluiso kick), 0:12. Giants 34–0. Drive: 10 plays, 77 yards, 3:19.

Third quarter

- NYG – Amani Toomer 7-yard pass from Kerry Collins (Brad Daluiso kick), 12:06. Giants 41–0. Drive: 5 plays, 29 yards, 2:35.

Fourth quarter

- No scoring plays.

Top passers

- MIN – Daunte Culpepper – 13/28, 78 yards, 3 INT
- NYG – Kerry Collins – 28/39, 381 yards, 5 TD, 2 INT

Top rushers

- MIN – Robert Smith – 7 rushes, 44 yards
- NYG – Tiki Barber – 12 rushes, 69 yards

Top receivers

- MIN – Cris Carter – 3 receptions, 24 yards
- NYG – Ike Hilliard – 10 receptions, 155 yards, 2 TD

In order to represent the NFC in Super Bowl XXXV, the Giants would battle it out against the Minnesota Vikings, who finished the regular season 11–5 and featured a high-flying offense featuring first-year starting quarterback Daunte Culpepper, running back Robert Smith, wide receivers Randy Moss and Cris Carter, and tackles Korey Stringer and Todd Steussie. Although they had lost their final three regular season games and had finished 28th in the league in total defense, as well as the fact that they would have to play outdoors in a cold-weather city on grass, the Vikings were favored to defeat the Giants and represent the NFC in the Super Bowl, with nearly all football analysts predicting the Vikings to win. These same critics claimed that in order for the Giants to win, they would have to rely heavily on the ground game to control the clock and keep the Vikings' offense off the field.

However, the Giants were planning a completely different game. Offensive Coordinator Sean Payton studied footage of the Vikings' defense and was so appalled at their secondary (particularly starting corners Robert Tate and Wasswa Serwanga) that he boldly stated at the Giants' first meeting before the game that they would throw for over 300 yards in the first half. This set the stage for one of the most lopsided games in NFC Championship history.

The Giants won the toss and elected to receive, and immediately picked the Vikings' secondary apart. Kerry Collins began the game by hitting Amani Toomer, who had hardly practiced all week due to an injury, on a slant pattern for 16 yards. After a 10-yard pass to Toomer and a running play, Collins found a wide-open Ike Hilliard on a four verticals play for a 46-yard touchdown, making the score 7–0 just five plays into the game. On the ensuing kickoff, Brad Daluiso's kick was poor, but Vikings running back Moe Williams misplayed the ball and fumbled. The Vikings had first shot at the ball, but the Giants' Lyle West recovered the ball at the Vikings' 18 yard line. On the very next play, Collins went for the end zone again for seldom-used fullback Greg Comella, and Comella caught the pass while falling into the end zone for another Giants touchdown. Just 2:13 into the game, the Giants led 14–0.

The Vikings' two best chances to score came later in the first quarter. Troy Walters returned the ensuing kickoff 24 yards to give the Vikings good field position at the 39 yard line, but a false start penalty pushed them out of field goal range and they punted. On the next drive, Kerry Collins threw an interception to Robert Tate, and the Vikings attempted to capitalize with Daunte Culpepper throwing to the end zone, but Emmanuel McDaniel stole the pass from Carter for an interception.

After another Collins interception, the Giants got back to work. Brad Daluiso kicked a field goal to make the score 17–0 in the first play of the second quarter. On the Giants' next drive, a 43-yard pass to Ron Dixon set up an 8-yard touchdown pass to Joe Jurevicius to make the score 24–0. Another Brad Daluiso field goal made the score 27–0, and then Collins found Hilliard for the second time for a touchdown with 12 seconds to go in the half to make the score 34–0 Giants at the half. True to Sean Payton's word, Collins had over 300 yards passing by this point.

On the first play from scrimmage in the second half, Shaun Williams sacked Daunte Culpepper and forced him to fumble, and the ball was recovered by Cornelius Griffin at the Vikings' 29 yard line. Kerry Collins then found Amani Toomer in the back of the end zone for a 7-yard touchdown to complete the scoring, 41–0.

Because the game was so lopsided, hardly any notable plays or events occurred after this. With the game having long been decided, both backup quarterback and longtime Cowboy Jason Garrett and seldom-used running back Joe Montgomery got extensive playing time in the fourth quarter, with Garrett completing his only pass attempt of the season. Frustration on the Vikings' side boiled over with Troy Walters being ejected for an unsportsmanlike conduct penalty late in the third quarter.

The Giants completely dominated on both sides of the ball, outgaining the Vikings 518–114. They outgained the Vikings 380–60 in net passing and held the ball for 42:22 to 17:38 for the Vikings.

Kerry Collins went 28 of 39 for 381 yards and 5 touchdowns. Although he also threw 2 interceptions, it hardly mattered as the Vikings converted neither of them into points. It is considered by many to be his single greatest game during his NFL career, which spanned 17 seasons with 6 different teams. Ike Hilliard caught 10 passes for 155 yards and 2 touchdowns.

On defense, the Giants completely shut down the Vikings' star players. Daunte Culpepper was held to just 78 yards passing with 3 interceptions, Randy Moss was held to 2 catches for 18 yards, and Cris Carter was held to 3 catches for 24 yards.

This was Vikings running back Robert Smith's final NFL game, as he retired in the offseason. It was also Vikings left tackle Korey Stringer's final game in the NFL, as he died from heatstroke during the Vikings' 2001 training camp. The NFC Championship loss sent the Vikings into a tailspin over the next two seasons, with the team going just 11–21 during that span.

With this win, the Giants earned the right to go to Super Bowl XXXV two weeks later in Tampa. After this game concluded, the Baltimore Ravens defeated the Raiders in Oakland to earn the right to face the Giants. The Giants would once again be underdogs against the Ravens' dominant defense in their quest for a Super Bowl championship.

==== Super Bowl XXXV: vs. Baltimore Ravens ====
Super Bowl XXXV: (4) Baltimore Ravens vs. (1) New York Giants – Game summary

Quarter	1	2	3	4	Total
Ravens	7	3	14	10	34
Giants	0	0	7	0	7

at Raymond James Stadium, Tampa, Florida

- Date: January 28
- Game time: 6:30 p.m. EST
- Game weather: Mostly cloudy, 65 °F (18 °C)
- Game attendance: 71,921
- Referee: Gerry Austin
- TV announcers (CBS): Greg Gumbel, Phil Simms, Armen Keteyian and Bonnie Bernstein

Game information

First quarter

- BAL – Brandon Stokley 38-yard pass from Trent Dilfer (Matt Stover kick), 6:50. Ravens 7–0. Drive: 2 plays, 41 yards, 0:45.

Second quarter

- BAL – Matt Stover 47-yard field goal, 1:41. Ravens 10–0. Drive: 7 plays, 59 yards, 2:28.

Third quarter

- BAL – Duane Starks 49-yard interception return (Matt Stover kick), 3:49. Ravens 17–0.
- NYG – Ron Dixon 97-yard kickoff return (Brad Daluiso kick), 3:31. Ravens 17–7.
- BAL – Jermaine Lewis 84-yard kickoff return (Matt Stover kick), 3:13. Ravens 24–7.

Fourth quarter

- BAL – Jamal Lewis 3-yard run (Matt Stover kick), 8:45. Ravens 31–7. Drive: 6 plays, 38 yards, 4:17.
- BAL – Matt Stover 34-yard field goal, 5:27. Ravens 34–7. Drive: 5 plays, 18 yards, 3:02.

Top passers

- BAL – Trent Dilfer – 12/25, 153 yards, TD
- NYG – Kerry Collins – 15/39, 112 yards, 4 INT

Top rushers

- BAL – Jamal Lewis – 27 rushes, 102 yards, TD
- NYG – Tiki Barber – 11 rushes, 49 yards

Top receivers

- BAL – Brandon Stokley – 3 receptions, 52 yards, TD
- NYG – Ike Hilliard – 3 receptions, 30 yards

== See also ==
- List of New York Giants seasons
