= Super Bowl XXXV =

2001 National Football League Championship Game

Baltimore Ravens (4) (AFC) (12–4)	New York Giants (1) (NFC) (12–4)
34	7
Head coach: Brian Billick	Head coach: Jim Fassel
	1	2	3	4	Total
BAL	7	3	14	10	34
NYG	0	0	7	0	7
- Date: January 28, 2001
- Stadium: Raymond James Stadium; Tampa, Florida
- MVP: Ray Lewis, linebacker
- Favorite: Ravens by 3
- Referee: Gerald Austin
- Attendance: 71,921

Ceremonies
- National anthem: Backstreet Boys
- Coin toss: Marcus Allen, Ottis Anderson, Tom Flores and Bill Parcells
- Halftime show: Aerosmith, *NSYNC, Britney Spears, Nelly and Mary J. Blige

TV in the United States
- Network: CBS
- Announcers: SD: Greg Gumbel, Phil Simms, Armen Keteyian and Bonnie Bernstein; HD: Kevin Harlan and Daryl Johnston
- Nielsen ratings: 40.4 (est. 84.3 million viewers)
- Market share: 60
- Cost of 30-second commercial: $2.1 million

Radio in the United States
- Network: Westwood One
- Announcers: Howard David, Matt Millen, Boomer Esiason, John Dockery and James Lofton

Super Bowl XXXV was an American football game to decide the National Football League (NFL) champion for the 2000 Season between the American Football Conference (AFC) Champion Baltimore Ravens and the National Football Conference (NFC) Champion New York Giants. The Ravens defeated the Giants to win their first championship in franchise history. Their 34–7 victory was tied for the seventh largest Super Bowl margin of victory with Super Bowl XXXVII. The game was played on January 28, 2001, at Raymond James Stadium in Tampa, Florida, the first time the stadium held a Super Bowl.

This was the fifth meeting between teams from Baltimore and New York City for a major professional sports championship, which previously occurred in the 1958 and 1959 NFL Championship Games, Super Bowl III (in which the New York Jets famously upset the Baltimore Colts), and the 1969 World Series. A team from Baltimore had not won a Super Bowl since the Colts' victory in 1971. The Ravens, who posted a 12–4 regular season record, became the third wild card team to win the Super Bowl and the second in four years. The Giants entered the game seeking to go 3–0 in Super Bowls after also finishing the regular season with a 12–4 record.

The Ravens allowed only 152 yards of offense by the Giants (the third-lowest total ever in a Super Bowl), recorded four sacks, and forced five turnovers. All sixteen of the Giants' possessions ended with punts or interceptions, with the exception of the last one, which ended when time expired in the game. The Giants' lone touchdown, a 97-yard kickoff return, was quickly answered by the Ravens on an 84-yard touchdown return on the ensuing kickoff. The Giants became the first team since the Cincinnati Bengals in Super Bowl XXIII not to score an offensive touchdown and the fifth overall. This was the fourth Super Bowl where the winning team outscored the losing team in all four quarters. Ravens linebacker Ray Lewis, who made three solo tackles, two assists, and blocked four passes, was named Super Bowl MVP.

In retrospect, Super Bowl XXXV has been ranked by several outlets as one of the worst Super Bowls due to its one-sidedness from start-to-finish as well as the game's lack of drama. The Ravens would not appear again until Super Bowl XLVII in 2013, defeating the San Francisco 49ers 34-31. The Giants would make another Super Bowl appearance in Super Bowl XLII seven years later, upsetting the then-undefeated Patriots 17-14.

== Background ==
=== Host selection process ===
NFL owners awarded Super Bowl XXXV to Tampa during their October 31, 1996, meeting in New Orleans. A total of five cities submitted bids: Miami (Joe Robbie Stadium), Atlanta (Georgia Dome), Tampa (Raymond James Stadium), Phoenix/Tempe (Sun Devil Stadium), and Los Angeles (Coliseum). The Los Angeles host committee originally was going to partner with Pasadena (Rose Bowl), but switched their plans to the Coliseum after a renovation plan was announced. However, the Los Angeles bid was dismissed when their delegation failed to convince the owners that planned stadium renovations would be completed in time.

Tampa became a favorite after voters passed a ballot measure in September 1996 to fund the construction of a new stadium. NFL commissioner Paul Tagliabue threw his support behind Tampa based on the new stadium plans. Owners initially planned on selecting only two hosts (XXXIII and XXXIV), but decided to name three after strong showings by the respective delegations. Miami, Atlanta, and Tampa were selected to host XXXIII, XXXIV, and XXXV, respectively. Tampa became the fourth metropolitan area to host the game at least three times, joining New Orleans, Miami, and Los Angeles.

The Tampa contingent expected to win the vote for XXXIV, but unexpectedly lost out to Atlanta. The Georgia Dome garnered a sympathy vote as Falcons owner Rankin Smith was terminally ill. Due to logistical conflicts, Atlanta would not be able to host the Super Bowl again until 2005, and some NFL owners desired to award the game to the city before Smith died. Tampa Bay Buccaneers owner Malcolm Glazer protested afterwards, feeling that he had been promised the game after securing funding for a new stadium. As a result, XXXV was added to agenda, and Tampa was selected.

=== Baltimore Ravens ===
The Ravens entered the game with the second-best defense in allowing yards in the league, with the fewest points allowed (165) and the fewest rushing yards allowed (970) during the regular season. At the time, they were the only team to hold the opposition to under 1,000 yards rushing in a season since the NFL adopted a 16-game schedule in 1978. The Ravens' 165 points allowed broke the record set by the 1986 Chicago Bears, who had given up 187 points. The Ravens' defense had held their opponents to ten or fewer points in eleven games, including four shutouts.

The defense was led by a trio of outstanding linebackers: Peter Boulware, Jamie Sharper, and Ray Lewis. During the regular season, Boulware recorded 7 sacks, while Sharper forced five fumbles and made one interception. Lewis was named the NFL Defensive Player of the Year by recording three sacks, making 138 tackles, and intercepting two passes. Pro Bowl defensive tackle Sam Adams and veteran Tony Siragusa anchored the defensive line, along with defensive ends Rob Burnett (10.5 sacks, three forced fumbles, and five fumble recoveries) and Pro Bowler Michael McCrary (6.5 sacks and three fumble recoveries). Baltimore also had an outstanding corps of defensive backs led by Pro Bowl veteran safety Rod Woodson, who along with Kim Herring, Duane Starks, and Chris McAlister combined for 17 interceptions.

On offense, the Ravens' main strength was rushing, led by rookie Jamal Lewis (1,364 yards, six rushing touchdowns, 27 receptions, 298 yards) and Priest Holmes (588 yards, 32 receptions, 221 yards). Also, tight end Shannon Sharpe recorded 67 receptions for 810 yards and five touchdowns. Receiver Qadry Ismail added 49 receptions for 655 yards and four touchdowns. The offensive line was anchored by tackle Jonathan Ogden, who was named to the Pro Bowl for the fourth consecutive season. On special teams, Jermaine Lewis ranked second in the NFL with 36 punt returns for 578 yards and two touchdowns, while also catching nineteen passes for 161 yards and another score. Kicker Matt Stover led the NFL in field goals made (35) and attempted (39), while ranking seventh in field goal percentage (89.7) and second in scoring (135 points).

However, the Ravens' offense was mediocre, ranking only thirteenth in the league in scoring (333 points), sixteenth in total yards (5,301), and 23rd in passing yards (3,102). The team had a lot of trouble scoring, and at one point they went through five games without scoring an offensive touchdown (although they managed to win two of those games). But they managed to regroup, as head coach Brian Billick forbade anyone to use the "P-word" (presumably "postseason" or "playoffs") until the team actually played in it. The Ravens' outspoken defensive lineman, Tony Siragusa, did utter the word "playoffs" on two occasions and was fined $500. Since the fine (and Billick's ban) were clearly symbolic and playful, Billick explained himself by saying, "He got a $400 fine for doing it on national television and $100 for doing it on his radio show. The reason being because no one listens to his show anyway." In place of the "P-word", the word "Festivus" was used, the December 23 secular holiday featured in an episode of the popular American television sitcom Seinfeld (the Ravens organization played along with this theme for that year's playoffs by showing a clip of Cosmo Kramer saying "A Festivus miracle!" on the stadium screen during the team's only home playoff game that year). The Super Bowl was thereafter referred to as "Festivus Maximus."

Midway through the season, with the team at 5–3, Billick benched starting quarterback Tony Banks and replaced him with Trent Dilfer. Although his statistics were hardly distinguished (twelve touchdowns, eleven interceptions, 76.6 passer rating), and the team lost in his first game as a starter, Dilfer led them to victory in their last seven regular season games to finish in second place in the AFC Central with a 12–4 record and entered the playoffs as a wild-card team.

=== New York Giants ===
The Giants advanced to Super Bowl XXXV after posting a 7–9 record in the previous year. Their big draft acquisition during the off-season was running back Ron Dayne, the 1999 Heisman Trophy winner. The plan was to have his power running style complement running back Tiki Barber's speed and pass-catching ability. The two would be called the Giants' "Thunder and Lightning" backfield. Although Dayne had a solid rookie year by rushing for 770 yards, the breakout star during the regular season was Barber. Barber had 1,006 rushing yards in 213 attempts, caught seventy passes for 719 yards, and scored ten touchdowns. He also returned 44 punts for 506 yards and gained 266 yards returning kickoffs, giving him 2,495 total yards.

Kerry Collins entered the season as the Giants' unquestioned starting quarterback. Although he helped lead the Carolina Panthers to the 1996 NFC Championship Game, he endured a mediocre season in 1997. In 1998, he quit part way through the season after the team opened the campaign with a four-game losing streak. After spending the remainder of the 1998 season with the New Orleans Saints, Collins was signed in 1999 as the Giants' second-string quarterback, but soon claimed the starting job. In leading the Giants to Super Bowl XXXV, Collins completed 311 out of 529 passes for 3,610 yards and 22 touchdowns during the regular season. His favorite targets, in addition to Barber, were wide receivers Amani Toomer (78 receptions, 1,094 yards, seven touchdowns), and Ike Hilliard (55 receptions, 787 yards, eight touchdowns), along with fullback Greg Comella (36 receptions for 274 yards). The Giants offensive line featured guard Ron Stone, the team's only Pro Bowl selection from the offense.

The Giants also had a powerful defense, led by Pro Bowl defensive end Michael Strahan, who recorded 9.5 sacks, and defensive tackle Keith Hamilton who recorded ten. Defensive backs Jason Sehorn, Emmanuel McDaniel, Reggie Stephens, and Shaun Williams combined for fourteen interceptions. Pro Bowl linebacker Jesse Armstead led the team in total tackles with 102, while also recording five sacks and an interception.

The Giants lost just four games that season, having won six of their first eight games before a subsequent two-game losing streak put them at 7–4 with five games to go. In what would be his defining moment, head coach Jim Fassel, at a press conference following the Giants' loss to the Detroit Lions, guaranteed that his team would make the playoffs. The Giants responded by winning their last five regular season games to reach 12–4 and win the NFC East for the first time in three years.

=== Playoffs ===
With an explosive defense and a "play-it-safe" offense, the Ravens became the seventh wild-card team to reach the Super Bowl, and third in four seasons, after allowing only a combined one touchdown and three field goals in their playoff wins over the Denver Broncos, 21–3, then their rivals, Tennessee Titans, 24–10, and the Oakland Raiders, 16–3. Meanwhile, the Giants defeated their rivals, the Philadelphia Eagles, 20–10, and shut out the Minnesota Vikings, 41–0, the most lopsided game in NFC Championship game history.

=== Pre-game news ===
Officially, the win made the Ravens the quickest expansion team in NFL history to win a Super Bowl. The Ravens were established when the Cleveland Browns relocated to Baltimore. Although much like the 1950 Browns winning the NFL Championship in their first season in the NFL after coming over from the All-America Football Conference, the Ravens were not an expansion team in the traditional sense of the term that started out as a completely brand new organization, coaching staff and players from scratch.

The Giants, as the designated home team, wore blue jerseys with grey pants. The team had previously worn blue jerseys with white pants in their two prior Super Bowl victories, but before the 2000 season, they replaced the Big Blue Wrecking Crew-era uniforms with a modern version of their early 1960s set. The Ravens donned all-white uniforms for the game.

== Broadcasting ==
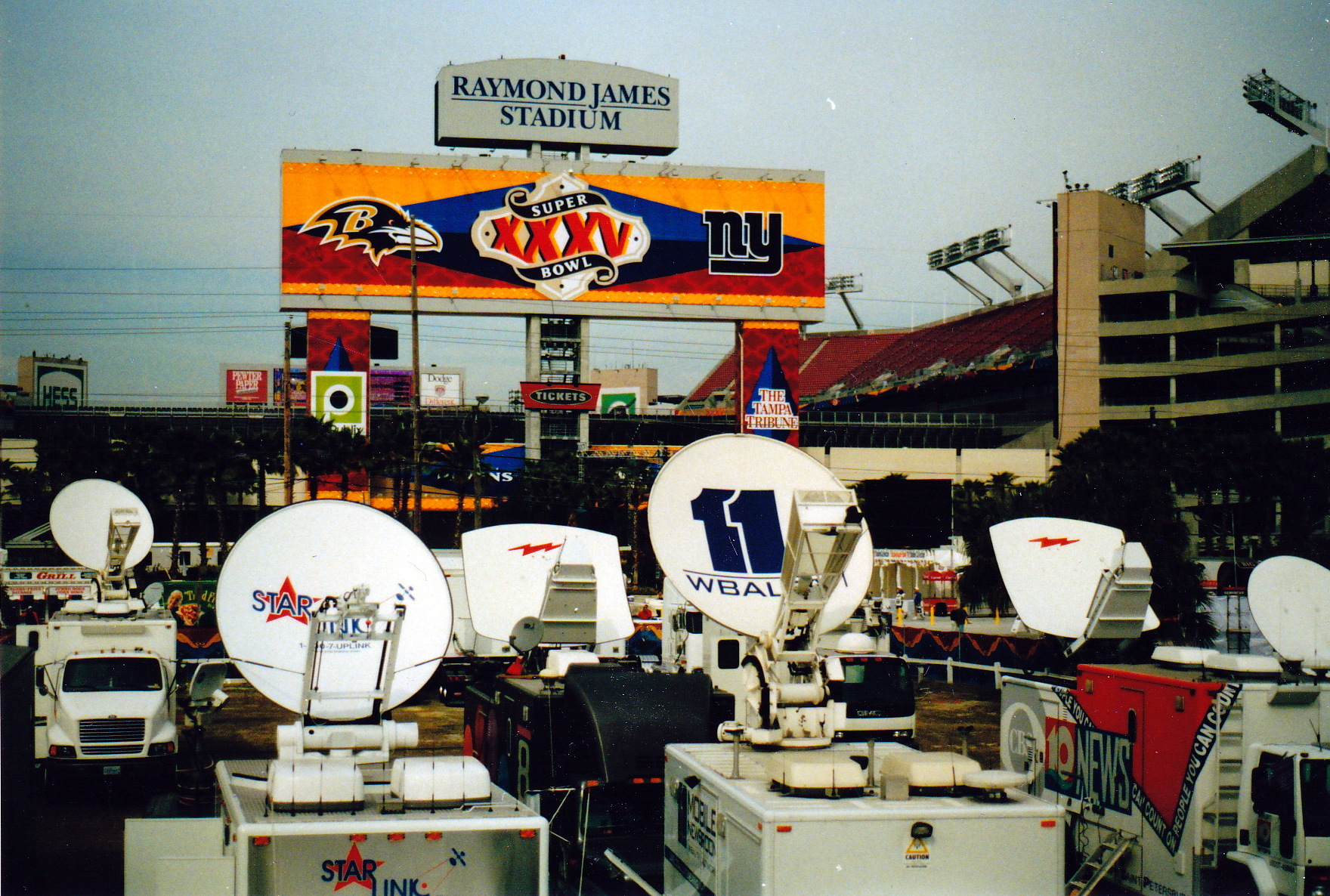
The broadcasting compound at Super Bowl XXXV

The game was broadcast in the United States by CBS. It was CBS's first Super Bowl since Super Bowl XXVI in January 1992. Following the 1993 season, Fox bought the rights to air the NFC package, leaving CBS without the NFL for the next four years until 1998, when they began broadcasting the AFC package.

Greg Gumbel became the third person to both host a Super Bowl pregame show and call the game, joining Dick Enberg and Al Michaels. Gumbel was the host during his first stint with CBS for Super Bowl XXVI, and he was the pregame host for Super Bowls XXX and XXXII when he was with NBC.

Gumbel was joined in the broadcast booth by color commentator Phil Simms. Armen Keteyian and Bonnie Bernstein served as sideline reporters. Jim Nantz hosted all the events with help from his then-fellow cast members from The NFL Today: Mike Ditka, Craig James, Randy Cross, and Jerry Glanville. The studio set was placed aboard the famous Buccaneer Cove pirate ship at the end zone of Raymond James Stadium.

The broadcast featured the brand-new EyeVision instant-replay system, which provided rapid-fire sequential shots from a series of cameras positioned around the top of the stadium. It allowed for bullet time effects, similar to those used in the movie The Matrix. It was extremely unusual for CBS to debut a major new technology system at an event the size of the Super Bowl. The EyeVision system proved its mettle when it helped to uphold a replay challenge on a Jamal Lewis 4th-quarter touchdown. EyeVision was also used during the broadcast of the Super Bowl XXXV halftime show. EyeVision would mostly fall out of use after Super Bowl XXXV, not being used in an NFL game until an upgraded version was announced for Super Bowl 50.

CBS also produced a separate HDTV broadcast of the game in the 1080i format, with Kevin Harlan and Daryl Johnston announcing. It was the second year that the game was televised in both standard-definition TV (NTSC) and HDTV.

== Entertainment ==
=== Pregame ceremonies ===
Before the game, a pregame show titled "Life's Super in Central Florida" was held, featuring Sting, Styx, and PYT. The show was directed and choreographed by Lesslee Fitzmorris from Covington, Louisiana. The in-stadium presentation also included a pre-recorded video of local singer Kaci Battaglia performing a bilingual version of "Paradise", filmed specifically for the event in Ybor City.

To honor the 225th anniversary of the birth of the United States, singer Ray Charles performed "America the Beautiful". The song was signed (ASL) by Tom Cooney. To honor the 10th anniversary of the Persian Gulf War, 10 military veterans from the conflict including former general Norman Schwarzkopf were introduced on the field. The vocal group (and Florida natives) Backstreet Boys then sang the national anthem becoming the only boyband to sing the national anthem at the Super Bowl. The anthem concluded with a flyover by a U.S. Air Force B-2 Spirit "stealth" bomber.

The coin toss ceremony honored the two previous Super Bowls that were played in Tampa. Representing the New York Giants' win in Super Bowl XXV was the game's MVP, Ottis Anderson, and former head coach Bill Parcells (coincidentally, tight end Howard Cross was the only Giants player on the 1990 team that was still active). Representing the Los Angeles Raiders' win in Super Bowl XVIII was that game's MVP, Marcus Allen, and former head coach Tom Flores.

This was the last Super Bowl to have individual player introductions for both teams (both the Ravens' and Giants' defenses were announced). In Super Bowl XXXVI, the New England Patriots bucked this trend and were introduced all at once as a team; the Rams, however, still used individual player introductions in that game. Starting with Super Bowl XXXVII, the league decided to have both participating teams introduced collectively as teams, instead of introducing them individually by player.

=== Halftime show ===
The halftime show was produced by MTV, then a sister network of CBS before the re-merger. The show was titled, "The Kings of Rock and Pop". It was headlined by Aerosmith and 'N Sync, and also featured appearances from Britney Spears, Nelly, Mary J. Blige, and Tremors featuring The Earthquake Horns. The show featured a back-and-forth medley between Aerosmith and 'N Sync.

=== Community events ===
The city of Tampa moved its annual Gasparilla Pirate Festival from its usual date in early February to the Saturday before the game. It was the largest Gasparilla in history, with over 750,000 attending.

== Game summary ==
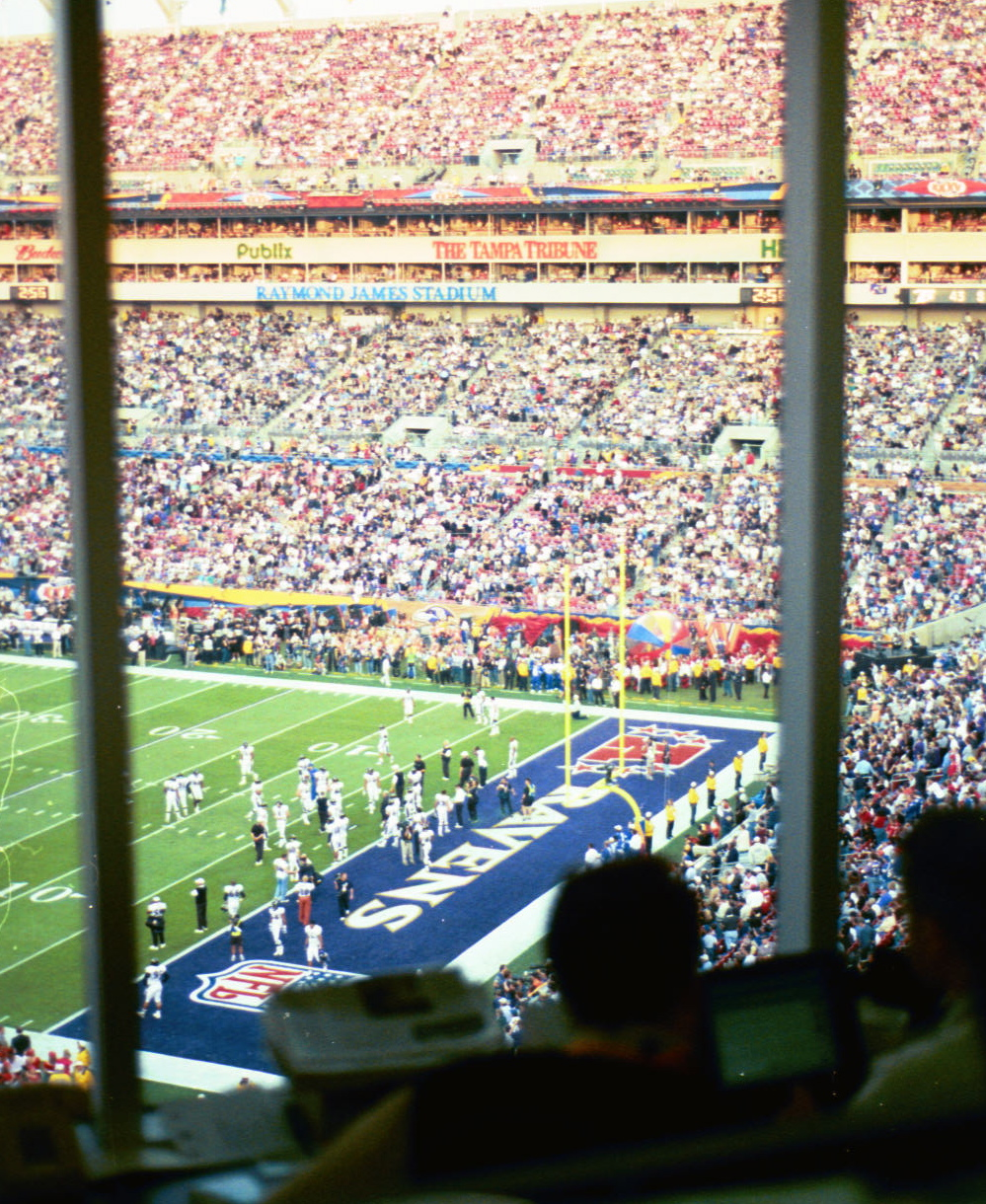
A view of the endzone from the press box.

=== First quarter ===
Both defenses dominated early in the first quarter as the first five possessions of the game ended in punts. On the fifth punt, Ravens wide receiver Jermaine Lewis returned the ball 43 yards to the Giants' 22-yard line. Although a holding penalty on Ravens cornerback Corey Harris during the return moved the ball back to the 41-yard line, the Ravens took only two plays to take an early 7–0 lead. First, running back Jamal Lewis picked up 3 yards, then quarterback Trent Dilfer completed a 38-yard touchdown pass to wide receiver Brandon Stokley.

=== Second quarter ===
After the teams exchanged punts three times each going into the second quarter, the Giants advanced to midfield, only to lose the ball when quarterback Kerry Collins threw a pass that was deflected by linebacker Ray Lewis and intercepted by linebacker Jamie Sharper. Then on the next play, a holding penalty against defensive tackle Keith Hamilton nullified linebacker Jessie Armstead's 43-yard interception return for a touchdown that could have tied the game. After the teams exchanged punts again, Dilfer completed a 44-yard pass to wide receiver Qadry Ismail to set up a 47-yard field goal by Ravens kicker Matt Stover to extend the Ravens' lead to 10–0. Aided by a face-mask penalty against Ravens linebacker Brad Jackson, a 16-yard completion from Collins to wide receiver Ron Dixon, and a 27-yard run by running back Tiki Barber, the Giants advanced all the way to the Ravens' 29-yard line on their ensuing drive, but cornerback Chris McAlister intercepted Collins' pass intended for wide receiver Ike Hilliard at the 1-yard line to keep the Giants scoreless at halftime.

=== Third quarter ===
The Giants forced the Ravens to punt on the opening drive of the second half. Five plays later, Ravens safety Kim Herring intercepted a pass intended for Hilliard at the Giants' 41-yard line. The Ravens then advanced to the 24-yard line, but Stover missed a 41-yard field goal attempt wide left.

After another exchange of punts, Ravens cornerback Duane Starks intercepted a pass intended for wide receiver Amani Toomer and returned it 49 yards for a touchdown, setting off a chain of events never seen before in Super Bowl history: three touchdowns on three consecutive plays in 36 seconds. On the ensuing kickoff, Dixon returned the ball 97 yards for the Giants' only score of the game to cut their deficit to 17–7. But Jermaine Lewis returned the next kickoff 84 yards for a touchdown of his own, making the score 24–7 in favor of the Ravens and essentially putting the game away. It was the first time in history two kickoffs were returned for touchdowns in the same Super Bowl game, and on back-to-back kickoffs.

=== Fourth quarter ===
The Giants gained only one first down on their final four possessions and were never able to move the ball into Ravens territory. Meanwhile, the Ravens added 10 more points to their lead, making the final score 34–7. Three possessions after Jermaine Lewis' touchdown, going into the fourth quarter, Giants punter Brad Maynard's 34-yard punt from his own 4-yard line to the 38-yard line and tight end Ben Coates' 17-yard reception from Dilfer set up a 3-yard touchdown run by Jamal Lewis. The Giants challenged the call, as Lewis appeared to fumble the ball out of the end zone for a touchback while being tackled by linebacker Micheal Barrow and defensive tackle Cornelius Griffin, but the officials determined that Lewis had stretched the ball across the goal line before he lost it, therefore confirming the score. Dixon returned the ensuing kickoff 25 yards, but he was stripped of the ball by cornerback James Trapp, and cornerback Robert Bailey recovered the fumble, setting up Stover's 34-yard field goal with 5:27 left in the game. The next two possessions ended in punts, and the Giants advanced to their own 49-yard line before the game ended.

=== Box score ===
Super Bowl XXXV: Baltimore Ravens 34, New York Giants 7

Quarter	1	2	3	4	Total
Ravens (AFC)	7	3	14	10	34
Giants (NFC)	0	0	7	0	7

at Raymond James Stadium, Tampa, Florida

- Date: January 28, 2001
- Game time: 6:28 p.m. EST
- Game weather: 65 °F (18 °C), clear

Scoring summary

Quarter	Time	Drive			Team	Scoring information	Score	
Quarter	Time	Plays	Yards	TOP	Team	Scoring information	BAL	NYG
1	6:50	2	41	0:45	BAL	Brandon Stokley 38-yard touchdown reception from Trent Dilfer, Matt Stover kick good	7	0
2	1:41	7	59	2:28	BAL	47-yard field goal by Stover	10	0
3	3:49	—	—	—	BAL	Interception returned 49 yards for touchdown by Duane Starks, Stover kick good	17	0
3	3:31	—	—	—	NYG	Ron Dixon 97-yard kickoff return for a touchdown, Brad Daluiso kick good	17	7
3	3:13	—	—	—	BAL	Jermaine Lewis 84-yard kickoff return for a touchdown, Stover kick good	24	7
4	8:45	6	38	4:17	BAL	Jamal Lewis 3-yard touchdown run, Stover kick good	31	7
4	5:27	5	18	3:02	BAL	34-yard field goal by Stover	34	7
"TOP" = time of possession. For other American football terms, see Glossary of American football.							34	7

=== Statistical overview ===
Dilfer threw for 153 yards and a touchdown, with no interceptions. Jamal Lewis rushed for 102 yards and a touchdown (only the second rookie to rush for 100 yards in the Super Bowl, joining Timmy Smith in Super Bowl XXII, while also being the first rookie to score a rushing touchdown in a Super Bowl since Smith in 1988), and caught a pass for four yards. Stokley was the top receiver of the game with three receptions for 52 yards and a touchdown. Jermaine Lewis recorded 152 total all-purpose yards (111 kickoff return yards, 34 punt return yards, seven receiving yards, one rushing yard) and a touchdown.

Collins had a passer rating for the game of only 7.1, the second worst in Super Bowl history, threw four interceptions (tying a Super Bowl record that has since been surpassed by Oakland quarterback Rich Gannon's five interceptions in Super Bowl XXXVII) and completed only 15 of 39 passes for 112 yards. Barber was the Giants' leading rusher with 49 yards, also catching six passes for 26 yards and returning two punts for thirteen yards, while Dixon tallied six kickoffs for 154 yards and a touchdown with a sixteen-yard pass catch. While Giants punter Brad Maynard set an undesirable Super Bowl record with eleven punts, Baltimore punter Kyle Richardson nearly matched him with ten punts.

Overall, both teams combined for only 396 total yards, the lowest in Super Bowl history. The Ravens joined Super Bowl XVIII's Los Angeles Raiders in the record books as the only teams to score offensive, defensive and special teams touchdowns in the same Super Bowl. The third team to do the same were the Seattle Seahawks in Super Bowl XLVIII. Super Bowl XXXV was the second Super Bowl since 1975 in which the losing team failed to score at least ten points, after Super Bowl XVIII.

All the main contributors for the Ravens on offense, defense, and special teams were named Lewis. Linebacker Ray Lewis, a native of Lakeland, Florida, less than an hour from Super Bowl host city Tampa, who made three solo tackles, two assists, and blocked four passes, became the second linebacker to be named Super Bowl MVP after Chuck Howley in Super Bowl V. Lewis also became the first defensive player to be honored since Larry Brown in Super Bowl XXX, and at the time the seventh defensive player to be Super Bowl MVP, joining Howley, Jake Scott, Harvey Martin, Randy White, Richard Dent, and Brown (since Lewis, only three additional defensive players have been named Super Bowl MVP: Tampa Bay Buccaneers safety Dexter Jackson in Super Bowl XXXVII, Seattle Seahawks linebacker Malcolm Smith in Super Bowl XLVIII, and Denver Broncos linebacker Von Miller in Super Bowl 50). Despite being named the game's Most Valuable Player, Lewis did not go to Walt Disney World because of an investigation during the previous year. Quarterback Trent Dilfer went in his place.

Jamal Lewis was the top rusher of the game, Jermaine Lewis notched 145 yards and a touchdown on special teams. In addition, the Ravens defense was coached by Marvin Lewis. The Ravens defense has since been considered among the greatest of all time. The Ravens defense became the third to shut-out their opponent in Super Bowl history; the Giants' only points came on a kickoff return. Washington in Super Bowl VII scored against Miami only after the late fumble by Garo Yepremian, which was returned for a touchdown. The only points Pittsburgh allowed to Minnesota in Super Bowl IX came on the return of a blocked punt.

The New York Giants started a trend of seven different NFC Champions in seven years. The Giants would return to the Super Bowl in 2007 and again in 2011 defeating the New England Patriots on both occasions, ending the current trend at the time, but starting a new one. Beginning with the 2001 St. Louis Rams, who played in Super Bowl XXXVI, there were ten different NFC Champions in ten years. Once again, the Giants ended the trend and started another one. Beginning with the 2008 Super Bowl XLIII participant Arizona Cardinals, there were six different NFC Champions in six years. This streak was finally ended by the Seattle Seahawks, who advanced to the Super Bowl in both 2013 and 2014.

The Baltimore Ravens would later win Super Bowl XLVII in 2013 against the San Francisco 49ers (which was also aired on CBS). Ray Lewis was a member of both Ravens' Super Bowl wins. In between the Ravens' victories, the Indianapolis Colts, the Pittsburgh Steelers, and the Patriots would have a Super Bowl appearance more than once, with New England and Pittsburgh winning more than once. The only other AFC team to make the Super Bowl in that stretch were the Oakland Raiders, in Super Bowl XXXVII.

Had the Giants won, it would have marked the first year since 1989 that a Super Bowl and World Series champion came from the same metropolitan area. The New York Yankees won the World Series during the Giants' season. Including the New Jersey Devils' win in the Stanley Cup Finals and the New York Mets' runner-up finish to the rival Yankees, there were four teams from the New York metropolitan area that made the championship round of their respective leagues in the same year.

== Final statistics ==
Sources: NFL.com Super Bowl XXXV, Super Bowl XXXV Play Finder Bal, Super Bowl XXXV Play Finder NYG

=== Statistical comparison ===
	Baltimore Ravens	New York Giants
First downs	13	11
First downs rushing	6	2
First downs passing	6	6
First downs penalty	1	3
Third down efficiency	3/16	2/14
Fourth down efficiency	0/0	1/1
Net yards rushing	111	66
Rushing attempts	33	16
Yards per rush	3.4	4.1
Passing – Completions-attempts	12/26	15/39
Times sacked-total yards	3–20	4–26
Interceptions thrown	0	4
Net yards passing	133	86
Total net yards	244	152
Punt returns-total yards	3–34	5–46
Kickoff returns-total yards	2–111	7–170
Interceptions-total return yards	4–59	0–0
Punts-average yardage	10–43.0	11–38.4
Fumbles-lost	2–0	2–1
Penalties-total yards	9–70	6–27
Time of possession	34:06	25:54
Turnovers	0	5

=== Individual leaders ===
Ravens passing
	C/ATT^{1}	Yds	TD	INT	Rating
Trent Dilfer	12/25	153	1	0	80.9
Tony Banks	0/1	0	0	0	39.6
Ravens rushing
	Car^{2}	Yds	TD	LG^{3}	Yds/Car
Jamal Lewis	27	102	1	19	3.78
Priest Holmes	4	8	0	6	2.00
Jermaine Lewis	1	1	0	1	1.00
Trent Dilfer	1	0	0	0	0.00
Ravens receiving
	Rec^{4}	Yds	TD	LG^{3}	Target^{5}
Brandon Stokley	3	52	1	38T	6
Ben Coates	3	30	0	17	3
Qadry Ismail	1	44	0	44	3
Patrick Johnson	1	8	0	8	5
Jermaine Lewis	1	6	0	6	1
Shannon Sharpe	1	5	0	5	5
Jamal Lewis	1	4	0	4	2
Priest Holmes	1	4	0	4	1

Giants passing
	C/ATT^{1}	Yds	TD	INT	Rating
Kerry Collins	15/39	112	0	4	7.1
Giants rushing
	Car^{2}	Yds	TD	LG^{3}	Yds/Car
Tiki Barber	11	49	0	27	4.45
Kerry Collins	3	12	0	5	4.00
Joe Montgomery	2	5	0	4	2.50
Giants receiving
	Rec^{4}	Yds	TD	LG^{3}	Target^{5}
Tiki Barber	6	26	0	7	10
Ike Hilliard	3	30	0	13	11
Amani Toomer	2	24	0	19	5
Ron Dixon	1	16	0	16	3
Howard Cross	1	7	0	7	1
Pete Mitchell	1	7	0	7	4
Greg Comella	1	2	0	2	1
Joe Jurevicius	0	0	0	0	4

^{1}Completions/attempts ^{2}Carries ^{3}Long gain ^{4}Receptions ^{5}Times targeted

=== Records set ===
The following records were set in Super Bowl XXXV, according to the official NFL.com boxscore, the 2016 NFL Record & Fact Book and the ProFootball reference.com game summary.

Player records set
Most fair catches, game	4	Jermaine Lewis (Baltimore)
Most punts, game	11	Brad Maynard (New York)
Records tied
Most interceptions thrown, game	4	Kerry Collins (New York)
Most interceptions returned for touchdown, game	1	Duane Starks (Baltimore)
Most kickoff returns for touchdown, game	1	Ron Dixon (New York); Jermaine Lewis (Baltimore)

Team records set
Most punts, game	11	Giants
Records tied
Most Interceptions by	4	Ravens
Most touchdowns scored by interception return	1	Ravens
Fewest turnovers, game	0	Ravens
Most kickoff returns for touchdowns	1	Ravens; Giants
Fewest points, first half	0 pts	Giants
Fewest rushing touchdowns	0	Giants
Fewest passing touchdowns	0	Giants

Turnovers are defined as the number of times losing the ball on interceptions and fumbles.

Records set, both team totals
	Total	Ravens	Giants
Fewest net yards, rushing and passing	396 yds	244	152
Most punts, game	21	10	11
Records tied, both team totals
Fewest rushing attempts	49	33	16
Fewest first downs	24	13	11
Fewest first downs rushing	8	6	2

== Starting lineups ==
Hall of Fame‡

Baltimore	Position	Position	New York
Offense
Qadry Ismail	WR		Amani Toomer
Jonathan Ogden‡	LT		Lomas Brown
Edwin Mulitalo	LG		Glenn Parker
Jeff Mitchell	C		Dusty Zeigler
Mike Flynn	RG		Ron Stone
Harry Swayne	RT		Luke Petitgout
Shannon Sharpe‡	TE	WR	Ike Hilliard
Brandon Stokley	WR		Ron Dixon
Trent Dilfer	QB		Kerry Collins
Sam Gash	FB		Greg Comella
Priest Holmes	RB		Tiki Barber
Defense
Rob Burnett	LDE		Michael Strahan‡
Sam Adams	LDT		Christian Peter
Tony Siragusa	RDT		Keith Hamilton
Michael McCrary	RDE		Cedric Jones
Peter Boulware	LLB		Micheal Barrow
Ray Lewis‡	MLB		Jessie Armstead
Jamie Sharper	RLB		Ryan Phillips
Duane Starks	LCB		Dave Thomas
Chris McAlister	RCB		Jason Sehorn
Kim Herring	SS		Sam Garnes
Rod Woodson‡	FS		Shaun Williams

== Officials ==
- Referee: Gerald Austin #34 third Super Bowl (XXIV as side judge, XXXI as referee)
- Umpire: Chad Brown #31 first Super Bowl
- Head linesman: Tony Veteri, Jr. #36 first Super Bowl
- Line judge: Walt Anderson #66 first Super Bowl
- Field judge: Bill Lovett #98 first Super Bowl
- Side judge: Doug Toole #4 second Super Bowl (XXXII)
- Back judge: Bill Schmitz #122 first Super Bowl
- Alternate referee: Larry Nemmers #20 (side judge for XXV)
- Alternate umpire: Jeff Rice #44

== Surveillance ==
The American Civil Liberties Union criticized a test of a system used at the event to monitor the people in attendance. A group of four companies installed a face recognition system to scan the faces of fans entering the stadium and compare them with a database of criminals. Attendees were not told that they were subject to this surveillance. Tampa police reported that the system identified nineteen criminals, but due to complaints and trouble with false positive results, it was not re-used the next year. Super Bowl XXXVI and all subsequent Super Bowls have been designated as a National Special Security Event, qualifying for extra security detail from the Secret Service.

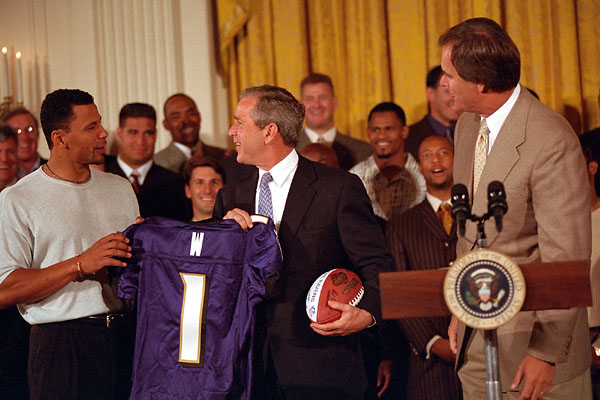
George W. Bush meets with Baltimore Ravens

== See also ==
- Rick Stoddard, 2001 Super Bowl public service announcement

== Bibliography ==
- Super Bowl official website
- Super Bowl XXXV: NFL Full Game on YouTube
- 2006 NFL Record and Fact Book. Time Inc. Home Entertainment. July 25, 2006. ISBN 1-933405-32-5.
- Total Football II: The Official Encyclopedia of the National Football League. HarperCollins. July 25, 2006. ISBN 1-933405-32-5.
- The Sporting News: History of the Super Bowl (Last accessed December 4, 2005)
- pro-football-reference.com Large online database of NFL data and statistics
- Super Bowl play-by-plays from USA Today (Last accessed September 28, 2005)
- All-Time Super Bowl Odds from The Sports Network (Last accessed October 16, 2005)
- Super Bowl XXXV Box Score at Pro Football Reference
