= Ron Dixon (American football) =

American football player (born 1976)

No. 86, 16
- Position: Wide receiver

Personal information
- Born: May 28, 1976 (age 50); Wildwood, Florida, U.S.
- Listed height: 6 ft 0 in (1.83 m)
- Listed weight: 190 lb (86 kg)

Career information
- High school: Wildwood (FL)
- College: Lambuth (1994–1999)
- NFL draft: 2000: 3rd round, 73rd overall pick

Career history
- New York Giants (2000–2003)

Awards and highlights
- NFL records: Most career kick return touchdowns in the playoffs: 2

Career NFL statistics
- Receptions: 36
- Receiving yards: 696
- Receiving touchdowns: 4
- Stats at Pro Football Reference

Ronald Dixon (born May 28, 1976) is an American former professional football player who was a wide receiver for the New York Giants in the National Football League (NFL). He was selected in the third round of the 2000 NFL draft.

His most notable performance was his 97-yard kick return for a touchdown in Super Bowl XXXV. Dixon's return was the only score for the Giants as they went on to lose to the Baltimore Ravens 34–7. He also recorded a 97-yard kickoff return for a touchdown in the Giants win over the Philadelphia Eagles in the Divisional playoffs that year. As a result, he holds the record for the most kickoff returns for a touchdown in a postseason campaign (2).

Dixon's career was once promising but was prematurely ended by a PCL injury in his left knee.

Dixon had try outs with the Miami Dolphins and the New Orleans Saints in the spring of 2005, but his knee injury was not healed enough for him to be effective, so he officially retired from the NFL as a vested veteran in 2005.

== NFL career statistics ==
Legend
**Bold**	Career high

=== Regular season ===
Year	Team	Games		Receiving					
Year	Team	GP	GS	Tgt	Rec	Yds	Avg	Lng	TD
2000	NYG	12	0	24	6	92	15.3	34	1
2001	NYG	**15**	0	21	8	227	**28.4**	**62**	1
2002	NYG	10	**3**	**36**	**22**	**377**	17.1	33	**2**
		37	3	81	36	696	19.3	62	4

=== Playoffs ===
Year	Team	Games		Receiving					
Year	Team	GP	GS	Tgt	Rec	Yds	Avg	Lng	TD
2000	NYG	**3**	**1**	**8**	3	**78**	**26.0**	**43**	0
2002	NYG	1	**1**	6	**5**	52	10.4	19	0
		4	2	14	8	130	16.3	43	0
