= Rick Stoddard =

Anti-smoking activist

Rick Stoddard is an anti-smoking activist, recognized for his 2001 Super Bowl public service announcement. Since then, Rick has become a prolific campaigner, speaking about the dangers of tobacco use and the marketing tactics employed by the tobacco industry.

== Campaign Life ==
Rick started campaigning against smoking shortly after his wife, Marie, was diagnosed with lung cancer in August 1999 due to cigarette smoking. Marie died five and a half months later in January 2000.

Since then, he has been a speaker at various schools and colleges across America. As part of these campaigns, Rick typically shares his personal experiences and provides in-depth, educational information on marketing tactics that tobacco companies use to lure non-smokers. He also speaks to teachers, school administrators and local politicians. During one of these presentations he made clear his views towards the tobacco companies:

When the tobacco industry states they will not advertise to youngsters in this country, they are lying, plain and simple. I travel all around the country talking to anyone trying to stop this and if I can stop one teenager from smoking, that’s a good day.

His career as a carpenter has dwindled as his campaigning against tobacco companies and tobacco use increased. It has been reported that he is on the road up to 200 days a year, leaving little time for carpentry.

== Recognition ==
Stoddard's book, The Burning Truth was selected in 2002 as an "Honorary Hoosier" by Governor Frank O'Bannon of Indiana and was also awarded the national ATOD 2003 Community Based Leadership Award by the American Public Health Association and an honorable "Kentucky Colonel" by Governor Ernie Fletcher in 2007.
