= Jeremiah Parker =

American football player (born 1977)

No. 79
- Position: Defensive end

Personal information
- Born: November 15, 1977 (age 48); Franklin, Louisiana, U.S.
- Listed height: 6 ft 5 in (1.96 m)
- Listed weight: 250 lb (113 kg)

Career information
- High school: De Anza (Richmond, California)
- College: California
- NFL draft: 2000: 7th round, 217th overall pick

Career history
- New York Giants (2000)

Career NFL statistics
- Games played: 4
- Stats at Pro Football Reference

Jeremiah Parker (born November 15, 1977) is an American former professional football player who was a defensive end for one season with the New York Giants in the National Football League (NFL). He played college football for the California Golden Bears and was selected by the Giants in the seventh round (217th overall) of the 2000 NFL draft.

== Early life and education ==
Jeremiah Parker was born on November 15, 1977, in Franklin, Louisiana. His family moved to Richmond, California, when he was young, and he attended De Anza High School, graduating in 1996. He was recruited by several Pac-10 Conference football teams, and chose California, to be close to his home. He was given immediate playing time as a freshman, earning a varsity letter in his first year. He remained a varsity member each season, until graduating in 2000. As a member of California, Parker played defensive end, weighing between 250 and 300 pounds in separate seasons.

== Professional career ==
Upon graduating in 2000, Parker was selected in the seventh round (217th overall) of the 2000 NFL draft by the New York Giants. Though making the team, Parker saw limited playing time as a rookie, staying inactive for all but four games of the season. He was predominantly a special teams player, and recorded no statistics other than four games played. Parker was a member of the Giants' Super Bowl XXXV team, and saw them lose 34-7 versus the Baltimore Ravens. He was released early in 2001, after being charged with manslaughter and child abuse.
