= Jaret Holmes =

American football player (born 1976)

No. 10, 2, 3
- Position: Kicker

Personal information
- Born: March 3, 1976 (age 50); Clinton, Mississippi, U.S.
- Listed height: 6 ft 0 in (1.83 m)
- Listed weight: 203 lb (92 kg)

Career information
- High school: Clinton
- College: Auburn
- NFL draft: 1998: undrafted

Career history
- Philadelphia Eagles (1998)*; Buffalo Bills (1999)*; Chicago Bears (1999)*; New York Giants (1999)*; Chicago Bears (1999); Berlin Thunder (2000); New York Giants (2000); Cincinnati Bengals (2001)*; Jacksonville Jaguars (2001); Carolina Panthers (2002)*
- * Offseason or practice squad member only

Awards and highlights
- First-team All-SEC (1997)
- Stats at Pro Football Reference

Jaret D. Holmes (born March 3, 1976) is an American former professional football placekicker in the National Football League (NFL) for the Chicago Bears (1999), New York Giants (2000) and Jacksonville Jaguars (2001). He played high school football at Clinton High School. Holmes played college football at Hinds Community College and Auburn University.
