= Keith Hamilton (American football) =

American football player (born 1971)

No. 75
- Position: Defensive tackle

Personal information
- Born: May 25, 1971 (age 55); Paterson, New Jersey, U.S.
- Listed height: 6 ft 6 in (1.98 m)
- Listed weight: 295 lb (134 kg)

Career information
- High school: Heritage (Lynchburg, Virginia)
- College: Pittsburgh
- NFL draft: 1992: 4th round, 99th overall pick

Career history
- New York Giants (1992–2003)

Awards and highlights
- Second-team All-Pro (2000); 68th greatest New York Giant of all-time; 2× First-team All-East (1989, 1990); Second-team All-East (1991)

Career NFL statistics
- Tackles: 514
- Sacks: 63
- Fumble recoveries: 14
- Stats at Pro Football Reference

Keith Lamarr Hamilton (born May 25, 1971) is an American former professional football player who was a defensive tackle for the New York Giants of the National Football League (NFL). He played college football for the Pittsburgh Panthers and was selected in the fourth round of the 1992 NFL draft. Hamilton spent his entire 12-season career with the Giants and recorded 63 sacks, placing him fourth on the team's career sack list since sacks became an official statistic in 1982. "Hammer," as he was known, played in 173 games in a Giants uniform, tying him with Harry Carson for sixth on the franchise's all-time list. He was named a Pro Bowl alternate in 2000, when he recorded ten sacks and the Giants reached Super Bowl XXXV.

== Legal troubles ==
On May 22, 2003, Hamilton, a resident of West Paterson (now Woodland Park, New Jersey) was arrested for possession of cocaine, possession of under 50 grams of marijuana, possession of drug paraphernalia, and consumption of alcohol in a vehicle. On May 24, 2004, Hamilton pleaded guilty to cocaine possession.

Hamilton was arrested at his home on February 3, 2006, after police signed two complaints against him, alleging that he repeatedly struck his 12-year-old son, Darius. Hamilton was sentenced August 11 to three years of probation after a plea deal for beating the boy.
