= Dave Thomas (cornerback) =

American football player (born 1968)

- Thomas with a student at Miami Beach Senior High School holding his Beach High Hall of Fame plaque

No. 41
- Position: Cornerback

Personal information
- Born: August 25, 1968 (age 58); Miami, Florida, U.S.
- Listed height: 6 ft 3 in (1.91 m)
- Listed weight: 218 lb (99 kg)

Career information
- High school: Miami Beach Senior (Miami Beach, Florida)
- College: Tennessee
- NFL draft: 1993: 8th round, 203rd overall pick
- Expansion draft: 1995: 16th round, 31st overall pick

Career history
- Dallas Cowboys (1993–1994); Jacksonville Jaguars (1995–1999); New York Giants (2000–2001)

Awards and highlights
- Super Bowl champion (XXVIII)

Career NFL statistics
- Games played: 130
- Games started: 53
- Interceptions: 9
- Stats at Pro Football Reference

David Garfield Thomas (born August 25, 1968) is an American former professional football player who was a cornerback in the National Football League (NFL) for the Dallas Cowboys, Jacksonville Jaguars, and New York Giants. He was selected in the eighth round of the 1993 NFL draft. He played college football for the Tennessee Volunteers.

== Early life ==
Thomas attended Miami Beach Senior High School, where he received third-team All-American and All-Conference honors in football as a senior. He also lettered in basketball and track.

== College career ==
He enrolled at Butler Community College, where he registered 7 interceptions as a freshman and 10 (second in the nation) as a sophomore, on his way to becoming one of the top cornerbacks in junior college.

As a junior in 1990, he transferred to the University of Tennessee. He appeared in all 13 games as a backup cornerback, posting 17 tackles, one interception (returned for 51 yards against UTEP) and one pass defensed.

As a senior in 1991, he was redshirted. In October, an off-field incident caused him to lose his final year of sports eligibility at Tennessee. In 1992, he didn't play football but still stay at the school and graduate.

== Professional career ==
=== Dallas Cowboys ===
Even though he was out of football for two years, the Dallas Cowboys selected him in the eighth round (203rd overall) of the 1993 NFL draft. During his time with the team he was one of the tallest cornerbacks in the NFL and showed promise playing special teams and in some of the nickel packages. He was a part of the Super Bowl XXVIII winning team. He appeared in 12 games and finished with 8 special teams tackles.

In 1994, he appeared in all 16 games as a backup cornerback. He collected 4 defensive tackles and 20 special teams tackles (fourth on the team).

=== Jacksonville Jaguars ===
The Jacksonville Jaguars selected him from the Cowboys roster in the 1995 NFL expansion draft. He was the team's nickel cornerback and played in 16 games with 2 starts. He tallied 39 tackles, 8 passes defensed, one fumble recovery, one blocked punt and 12 special teams tackles (second on the team)

In 1996, he became the starting left cornerback after replacing Vinnie Clark in the fifth game against the Carolina Panthers. In the ninth against the Cincinnati Bengals, he sustained a fractured left femur while covering an onside kick after colliding with teammate Dana Hall. He was placed on the injured reserve list on October 29. He tallied 36 tackles (2 for loss), 2 interceptions, 6 passes defensed and 5 special teams tackles. He was replaced with rookie Aaron Beasley.

In 1997, although he was named starter at right cornerback and appeared in all 16 games, it has been speculated that he was never the same player after his injury. He collected a career-high 88 tackles, along with 2 interceptions, 15 passes defensed, 2 forced fumbles and one fumble recovery.

In 1998, he started 12 out of 14 games at right cornerback. He missed 2 games and left 3 other contests early because of injuries. He recorded 69 tackles, one interception, 15 passes defensed, 4 forced fumbles (led the team), 2 quarterback hurries, one fumble recovery and 3 special teams tackles.

In 1999, he was relegated to backup rookie Fernando Bryant at left cornerback and playing in the nickel defense. He finished with 15 tackles, 2 interceptions, 4 passes defensed, one blocked punt and 18 special teams tackles, one punt block and one forced fumble on special teams.

=== New York Giants ===
On April 11, 2000, he signed as a free agent with the New York Giants to play special teams and in the nickel defense, but was named the starter when Conrad Hamilton was injured and later waived. He was a part of the team that made Super Bowl XXXV and lost to the Baltimore Ravens.

In 2001, he was replaced as the starter at left cornerback with Will Allen. He was released on March 1, 2002.
