= Shaun Williams (American football) =

American football player and coach (born 1976)

Personal information
- Born: October 10, 1976 (age 50); Oakland, California, U.S.
- Listed height: 6 ft 2 in (1.88 m)
- Listed weight: 218 lb (99 kg)

Career information
- High school: Crespi Carmelite (Encino, California)
- College: UCLA
- NFL draft: 1998: 1st round, 24th overall pick

Career history

Playing
- New York Giants (1998–2005); Carolina Panthers (2006)

Coaching
- William Paterson (2009–2012) Assistant coach; William Paterson (2013–2020) Defensive coordinator & safeties coach; William Paterson (2021) Interim head coach; William Paterson (2022–2025) Head coach

Awards and highlights
- Second-team All-American (1997); First-team All-Pac-10 (1997)

Career NFL statistics
- Tackles: 501
- Interceptions: 15
- Sacks: 4.5
- Stats at Pro Football Reference

Head coaching record
- Career: 10–30 (.250)

Shaun LeJon Williams (born October 10, 1976) is an American college football coach and former professional player who was a safety in the National Football League (NFL), primarily with the New York Giants. He was most recently the head football coach for William Paterson University, a position he held on an interim basis in 2021 and full-time from 2022 through 2025. He played college football for the UCLA Bruins, earning second-team All-American honors in 1997.

== Early life ==
Williams attended Crespi Carmelite High School in Encino, California and played both tailback and safety. He won All-CIF Division I and Del Rey League MVP in his last two seasons of his high school career.

== College career ==
He attended the University of California, Los Angeles, where he majored in Pre-Psychology. Williams started in three of his four seasons for the Bruins. As a junior, started nine games and registered 59 tackles (3rd on the team) and three sacks resulting in All-Pac-10 Honorable Mention. In his senior season, Williams started nine games and recorded two interceptions and nine pass deflections. He also finished second on the team with 68 tackles. Was chosen for the All-Pac-10 Conference First-team.

== Professional career ==
Williams was drafted in the first round with the 24th overall pick in 1998 NFL draft by the New York Giants. In the 1998 and 1999 seasons, he mainly played in the nickel defense and special teams. Williams started every game in the 2000–2002 seasons. In 2003, Williams suffered a season-ending right knee injury in 10th game of the season versus the Philadelphia Eagles. He started two games in the 2004 season before tearing a ligament in his left knee, which forced him to miss the remainder of the season.

In his nine years in the NFL, Williams recorded 335 tackles, 4.5 sacks, 15 interceptions with a total of 130 yards in the returns.

=== NFL statistics ===
Year	Team	Games	Combined tackles	Tackles	Assisted tackles	Sacks	Forced fumbles	Fumble recoveries	Fumble return yards	Interceptions	Interception return yards	Yards per interception return	Longest interception return	Interceptions returned for touchdown	Passes defended
1998	NYG	13	24	19	5	0.0	0	0	0	2	6	3	6	0	3
1999	NYG	11	16	12	4	0.0	0	0	0	0	0	0	0	0	5
2000	NYG	16	88	68	20	0.0	0	1	0	3	52	17	40	0	13
2001	NYG	16	95	77	18	1.0	0	0	0	3	25	8	20	0	9
2002	NYG	16	91	66	25	2.0	0	1	0	2	-2	-1	0	0	10
2003	NYG	10	60	46	14	1.5	1	1	0	1	14	14	14	0	5
2004	NYG	2	10	10	0	0.0	1	0	0	0	0	0	0	0	2
2005	NYG	8	19	17	2	0.0	0	0	0	2	34	17	34	0	2
2006	CAR	12	73	61	12	0.0	1	0	0	2	1	1	1	0	4
Career		104	476	376	100	4.5	3	3	0	15	130	9	40	0	53

== Post NFL ==
In 2013, Williams became the defensive coordinator at William Paterson University for their football team, the Pioneers, after spending the preceding four seasons as a part-time assistant coach there. He was promoted to head coach in 2022. Williams announced the New York Giants 33rd overall pick for the 2015 NFL Draft Landon Collins.

== Head coaching record ==
Year	Team	Overall	Conference	Standing	Bowl/playoffs
William Paterson Pioneers (New Jersey Athletic Conference) (2022–2025)
2022	William Paterson	5–5	2–4	T–4th	
2023	William Paterson	2–8	1–5	6th	
2024	William Paterson	1–9	0–6	7th	
2025	William Paterson	2–8	1–6	7th	
William Paterson:		10–30	4–21		
Total:		10–30			

== See also ==
- History of the New York Giants (1994–present)
