= Jack Golden =

American football player (born 1977)

No. 90, 58
- Position: Linebacker

Personal information
- Born: January 28, 1977 (age 49); Harvey, Illinois, U.S.

Career information
- High school: Thornton Township (Harvey, Illinois)
- College: Oklahoma State
- NFL draft: 2000: undrafted

Career history
- New York Giants (2000–2001); Tampa Bay Buccaneers (2002–2003); Chicago Bears (2004)*; Indianapolis Colts (2004)*
- * Offseason or practice squad member only

Awards and highlights
- Super Bowl champion (XXXVII)

Career NFL statistics
- Tackles: 20
- Fumble recoveries: 1
- Stats at Pro Football Reference

Jack Danta' Golden (born January 28, 1977) is an American former professional football player who was a linebacker in the National Football League (NFL). He played college football for the Oklahoma State Cowboys before being signed by the New York Giants as an undrafted free agent in 2000. Golden later won a Super Bowl with the Tampa Bay Buccaneers.
