= Greg Comella =

American football player (born 1975)

Profile
- Position: Fullback

Personal information
- Born: July 29, 1975 (age 51); Wellesley, Massachusetts, U.S.
- Listed height: 6 ft 1 in (1.85 m)
- Listed weight: 240 lb (109 kg)

Career information
- High school: Xaverian Brothers (Westwood, Massachusetts)
- College: Stanford

Career history
- 1998–2001: New York Giants
- 2002: Tennessee Titans
- 2003: Houston Texans
- 2004: Tampa Bay Buccaneers
- Stats at Pro Football Reference

Gregory F. Comella (born July 29, 1975, in Wellesley, Massachusetts) is an American former professional football player who was a fullback in the National Football League (NFL). He played college football for the Stanford Cardinal.

== Football career ==
Comella played 7 seasons in the NFL between 1998 and 2005 for the New York Giants, the Tennessee Titans, the Houston Texans and the Tampa Bay Buccaneers. He was the starting fullback for the New York Giants in Super Bowl XXXV against the Baltimore Ravens.

Comella played for the Stanford Cardinal football team between 1993 and 1996. He rushed for 498 yards and caught 48 passes in his college career. Further, he had 19 career touchdowns and 12 rushing touchdowns, both among Stanford's all-time best.

Comella played for the Xaverian Hawks football team between 1989 and 1992. He was named the 1992 Massachusetts Player of the Year by numerous publications and named to Super Prep's All-America team. In his career, he had over 3,800 all-purpose yards and 40 touchdowns. Comella currently holds the Massachusetts state record for longest touchdown run, which was 94 yards set in 1992. Xaverian inducted Comella into the school's Athletic Hall of Fame in 2014.

== Business career ==
Comella is now a business manager of his family-owned Comella's Restaurants with 12 locations throughout the Greater Boston area.

== Education ==
Comella graduated from the Xaverian Brothers High School in Westwood, Massachusetts and was a National Football Foundation Scholar-Athlete Award winner in 1993. Comella received his bachelor's degree in psychology from Stanford University in 1998 and his MBA from the Harvard Business School in 2009.
