= Ryan Phillips (American football) =

American football player (born 1974)

No. 91, 56
- Position: Linebacker

Personal information
- Born: February 7, 1974 (age 52); Renton, Washington, U.S.
- Listed height: 6 ft 4 in (1.93 m)
- Listed weight: 252 lb (114 kg)

Career information
- High school: Auburn (WA)
- College: Idaho
- NFL draft: 1997: 3rd round, 68th overall pick

Career history
- New York Giants (1997–2000); Oakland Raiders (2001)*; Indianapolis Colts (2001); New England Patriots (2002)*
- * Offseason or practice squad member only

Career NFL statistics
- Tackles: 201
- Sacks: 3.5
- Interceptions: 4
- Forced fumbles: 1
- Stats at Pro Football Reference

Richard Ryan Phillips (born February 7, 1974) is an American former professional football player who was a linebacker for five seasons in the National Football League (NFL) for the New York Giants and the Indianapolis Colts. He was a third round draft selection in the 1997 NFL draft, the 68th overall pick. At the time, one of his hobbies was skydiving.

Phillips played high school football in the Seattle area at Auburn Senior High School in Auburn, Washington, and college football for the Vandals of the University of Idaho in Moscow. He was the Big Sky Conference defensive player of the year and an All-American (Division I-AA) as a junior in 1995 at defensive end. Phillips moved to outside linebacker as a senior in 1996.

== NFL career statistics ==
Pre-draft measurables
Height	Weight	Arm length	Hand span	20-yard shuttle	Vertical jump	Broad jump	Bench press
6 ft 3 7/8 in (1.93 m)	251 lb (114 kg)	33 in (0.84 m)	10 1/8 in (0.26 m)	4.11 s	32.0 in (0.81 m)	9 ft 7 in (2.92 m)	21 reps
All values from NFL Combine

Legend
**Bold**	Career high

=== Regular season ===
Year	Team	Games		Tackles				Interceptions				Fumbles			
Year	Team	GP	GS	Comb	Solo	Ast	Sck	Int	Yds	TD	Lng	FF	FR	Yds	TD
1997	NYG	10	0	1	1	0	1.0	0	0	0	0	0	0	0	0
1998	NYG	16	3	21	15	6	0.0	0	0	0	0	0	0	0	0
1999	NYG	16	16	**77**	**54**	**23**	0.0	1	0	0	0	0	0	0	0
2000	NYG	16	15	58	42	16	**1.5**	**2**	**22**	0	12	**1**	0	0	0
2001	IND	13	6	44	32	12	1.0	1	18	0	**18**	0	0	0	0
		71	40	201	144	57	3.5	4	40	0	18	1	0	0	0

=== Playoffs ===
Year	Team	Games		Tackles				Interceptions				Fumbles			
Year	Team	GP	GS	Comb	Solo	Ast	Sck	Int	Yds	TD	Lng	FF	FR	Yds	TD
2000	NYG	3	2	6	5	1	0.0	0	0	0	0	0	0	0	0
		3	2	6	5	1	0.0	0	0	0	0	0	0	0	0
