= Emmanuel McDaniel =

American football player (born 1972)

No. 26, 39, 25
- Position: Cornerback

Personal information
- Born: July 27, 1972 (age 54); Jonesboro, Georgia, U.S.
- Listed height: 5 ft 9 in (1.75 m)
- Listed weight: 180 lb (82 kg)

Career information
- High school: Jonesboro
- College: East Carolina
- NFL draft: 1996: 4th round, 111th overall pick

Career history
- Carolina Panthers (1996); Indianapolis Colts (1997–1998); Miami Dolphins (1998); New York Giants (1999–2001); Cleveland Browns (2002)*; Carolina Panthers (2002); Arizona Cardinals (2003)
- * Offseason or practice squad member only

Career NFL statistics
- Tackles: 169
- Interceptions: 8
- Passes defended: 31
- Stats at Pro Football Reference

Emmanuel McDaniel (born July 27, 1972) is an American former professional football player who was a cornerback for seven seasons in the National Football League (NFL) with the Carolina Panthers, Indianapolis Colts, New York Giants, Miami Dolphins and Arizona Cardinals. He played college football for the East Carolina Pirates and was selected by the Panthers in the fourth round of the 1996 NFL draft.

McDaniel was a four-year letterman (1992–1995) at East Carolina University before moving onto the NFL. He ended his Pirate tenure with 112 tackles and 13 interceptions, pacing the Pirates in that category from 1993 to 1995 (2 in 1993, 5 in 1994, and 6 in 1995). He is tied in East Carolina Pirates record book for career high interception for a touchdown with two. As a college senior, he earned First-team All-South Independent honors.

McDaniel's professional career began with the Carolina Panthers, who selected him with the 111th pick of the fourth round in the 1996 NFL draft. As a defensive back and special teams standout, he spent seven years in the NFL with the Carolina Panthers (1996, 2002), Indianapolis Colts (1997), Miami Dolphins (1998), New York Giants (1999–2001), and the Arizona Cardinals (2003).

He ended his professional career with 161 tackles, 32 passes defended and nine interceptions. McDaniel had six interceptions in 2000, when he helped the New York Giants to a 12–4 regular-season record.

The Jonesboro, Georgia native is one of 14 East Carolina Pirates to be on the active roster for a Super Bowl team, earning a starting nod as the nickel back in Super Bowl XXXV against the Baltimore Ravens. A week prior to Super Bowl XXXV, McDaniel was named the New York Giants Defensive Player-of-the-Game in a 41–0 victory over the Minnesota Vikings in the NFC Championship Game.

After ending his player career, McDaniel took time away from the game to be with his newborn son until the 2006 season, when he volunteered in the Akron Zips football office. From 2007 to 2009, he served as the Akron Zips football Cornerback Coach, guiding two players to All Mid-American Conference honors.

McDaniel also worked for the East Carolina Pirates as a Strength and Conditioning Coach from 2011 -2014.

McDaniel received a Bachelor of Art in Criminal Justice from East Carolina University in 1995.
