= Micheal Barrow =

American football player and coach (born 1970)

No. 51, 56, 58, 48
- Position: Linebacker

Personal information
- Born: April 19, 1970 (age 56); Homestead, Florida, U.S.
- Listed height: 6 ft 2 in (1.88 m)
- Listed weight: 245 lb (111 kg)

Career information
- High school: Homestead
- College: Miami (FL)
- NFL draft: 1993: 2nd round, 47th overall pick

Career history

Playing
- Houston Oilers (1993–1996); Carolina Panthers (1997–1999); New York Giants (2000–2003); Washington Redskins (2004); Dallas Cowboys (2005)

Coaching
- Homestead High School (2006) Assistant head coach & defensive coordinator; Miami (2007–2013) Linebackers coach & special teams coach; Seattle Seahawks (2015–2016) Linebackers coach; Seattle Seahawks (2017) Assistant head coach & linebackers coach

Awards and highlights
- Bill Willis Trophy (1992); Consensus All-American (1992); 2× National champion (1989, 1991); Big East Defensive Player of the Year (1992)

Career NFL statistics
- Tackles: 1,124
- Sacks: 43
- Forced fumbles: 22
- Stats at Pro Football Reference

Micheal Colvin Barrow (born April 19, 1970) is an American former professional football player who was a linebacker for 12 seasons in the National Football League (NFL). He played college football for the Miami Hurricanes, earning consensus All-American honors. The Houston Oilers selected him in the second round of the 1993 NFL draft. He also played professionally for the Carolina Panthers, New York Giants and Dallas Cowboys of the NFL.

== Early life ==
Barrow was born in Homestead, Florida. He attended Homestead High School and played high school football for the Homestead Broncos.

== College career ==
While attending the University of Miami, Barrow played for the Miami Hurricanes football team from 1989 to 1992. The Hurricanes were consensus national champions twice during Barrow's college career (1989, 1991) and played for a third national championship (1992). As a senior in 1992, he was recognized as a consensus first-team All-American.

== Professional career ==
The Houston Oilers selected Barrow in the second round (47th overall pick) in the 1993 NFL draft. He played for the Oilers from 1993 to 1996. In thirteen NFL seasons, Barrow also played for the Carolina Panthers, New York Giants, Washington Redskins and Dallas Cowboys. While playing for the New York Giants in the 2003 season, he led the NFC with 150 tackles. He finished his career with 1,125 tackles and 43 sacks.

== Coaching ==
=== High school ===
After retiring from the NFL, Barrow started coaching at his alma mater, Homestead High School, as the Assistant Head Coach and defensive coordinator for the 2006 season.

=== College ===
Barrow was the Linebackers Coach and Special Teams Coordinator at his alma mater, the University of Miami, where he won two national championships as a player. He entered his 7th year on the Hurricanes' coaching staff going into the 2013 season. He was originally hired by former Miami Head Coach Randy Shannon in 2007 and was retained on staff by current Head Coach Al Golden when Golden was hired in 2010.

=== Professional ===
Barrow was named the Linebackers Coach for the Seattle Seahawks on February 9, 2015.

=== Personal life ===
Barrow has four children: Mikenzi, Kaleb, John Michael, and Michael.
