= 1957 All-Skyline Conference football team =

American college football team

1957 All-Skyline Conference football team
| 1956 | 1957 | 1958 |

The 1957 All-Skyline Conference football team consists of American football players selected to the All-Skyline team selected for the 1957 college football season.

== Ends ==
- Gary Kapp, Utah State (AP-1; DN-1)
- Wimp Hewgley, Wyoming (AP-1)
- Russ Mather, Wyoming (DN-1)
- R. K. Brown, BYU (DN-2)
- George Boss, Utah (DN-2)

== Tackles ==
- John Kapele, BYU (AP-1; DN-1)
- Evert Jones, Utah (AP-1; DN-2)
- Larry Amizich, Utah (DN-1)
- Sal Cesario, Denver (DN-2)

== Guards ==
- Stan Renning, Montana (AP-1; DN-1)
- Bob Huber, Denver (AP-1; DN-1)
- Jerry Nesbitt, New Mexico (DN-2)
- Paul Eckel, BYU (DN-2)

== Center ==
- John Urses, Utah (AP-1; DN-1)
- Warren Benson, Wyoming (DN-2)

== Quarterback ==
- Lee Grosscup, Utah (AP-1; DN-1)
- Bob Winters, Utah State (DN-2)

== Halfbacks ==
- Stuart Vaughan, Utah (AP-1; DN-1)
- Overton Curtis, Utah State (DN-1)
- Don Perkins, New Mexico (DN-2)
- George Colbert, Denver (DN-2)

== Fullbacks ==
- Merrill Douglas, Utah (AP-1; DN-1)
- Greg Maushart, Wyoming (DN-2)

== Key ==
AP = Associated Press

DN = Deseret News

== See also ==
- 1957 College Football All-America Team
