= 1954 All-Skyline Conference football team =

American college football team

1954 All-Skyline Conference football team
1953	1954	1955

The 1954 All-Skyline Conference football team consists of American football players selected to the All-Skyline team selected for the 1954 college football season.

== Ends ==
- Clarence Carter, Wyoming (AP-1)
- Larry Ross, Denver (AP-1)
- Marion Probert, BYU (AP-2)
- Charles Hatch, Utah State (AP-2)

== Tackles ==
- Ed Horvat, Denver (AP-1)
- Ray Lutterman, Wyoming (AP-1)
- Dave Kragthorpe, Utah State (AP-2)
- Don Henderson, Utah (AP-2)

== Guards ==
- Joe DeLuca, Montana (AP-1)
- Carl Ebert, Utah State (AP-1)
- Reed Henderson, Utah State (AP-2)
- Jay Crampton, New Mexico (AP-2)

== Center ==
- Larry White, New Mexico (AP-1)
- Bill Tavener, Colorado A&M (AP-2)

== Quarterback ==
- Harold Fairly, Denver (AP-1)
- Joe Mastrogiovanni, Wyoming (AP-2)

== Halfbacks ==
- Dick Imer, Montana (AP-1)
- Fred K. Mahaffey, Denver (AP-1)
- Lou Mele, Utah (AP-2)
- George Galuska, Wyoming (AP-2)

== Fullbacks ==
- Gary Glick, Colorado A&M (AP-1)
- Herb Nakken, Utah (AP-2)

== Key ==
AP = Associated Press

== See also ==
- 1954 College Football All-America Team
