= List of Utah State Aggies in the NFL draft =

This is a list of Utah State Aggies football players in the NFL draft.

== Key ==
B	Back	K	Kicker	NT	Nose tackle
C	Center	LB	Linebacker	FB	Fullback
DB	Defensive back	P	Punter	HB	Halfback
DE	Defensive end	QB	Quarterback	WR	Wide receiver
DT	Defensive tackle	RB	Running back	G	Guard
E	End	T	Offensive tackle	TE	Tight end

== Selections ==
Year	Round	Pick	Player	Team	Position
1937	10	98	Ed Wade	Chicago Bears	T
1944	6	48	Jack Okland	New York Giants	T
1945	11	105	Howie Hansen	Detroit Lions	T
1945	14	137	John Putnik	Washington Redskins	E
1946	5	33	Jack Seiferling	Pittsburgh Steelers	B
1947	18	156	Ralph Maughan	Detroit Lions	E
1948	7	53	Moroni Schwab	Detroit Lions	T
1948	20	176	Frank Williams	New York Giants	B
1949	14	132	Dale Panter	Detroit Lions	T
1950	10	129	Jay Van Noy	Los Angeles Rams	B
1952	25	296	Bob Stoddard	Chicago Bears	T
1954	16	186	Earl Lindley	Chicago Bears	B
1955	16	188	Dave Kragthorpe	New York Giants	G
1955	30	359	Charley Hatch	Detroit Lions	E
1956	13	151	Jack Hill	Baltimore Colts	B
1956	15	171	Reed Henderson	San Francisco 49ers	T
1957	12	144	Larry Sorenson	Chicago Bears	T
1957	22	258	Bob Winters	Cleveland Browns	QB
1957	29	343	Tom Ramage	Pittsburgh Steelers	G
1958	30	356	Gary Lund	Baltimore Colts	G
1959	11	127	Overton Curtis	Pittsburgh Steelers	B
1959	12	141	Mike Connelly	Los Angeles Rams	C
1959	22	261	Bill Meglen	Los Angeles Rams	G
1960	5	59	Len Rohde	San Francisco 49ers	T
1961	5	58	Clark Miller	San Francisco 49ers	T
1961	10	127	Doug Mayberry	Minnesota Vikings	RB
1962	1	3	Merlin Olsen	Los Angeles Rams	DT
1962	2	20	Clyde Brock	Chicago Bears	T
1962	18	251	Tom Larscheid	Philadelphia Eagles	B
1962	20	269	Terry Cagaanan	Minnesota Vikings	B
1963	4	54	Lionel Aldridge	Green Bay Packers	G
1963	11	148	Steve Shafer	San Francisco 49ers	B
1963	19	254	Darnell Haney	St. Louis Cardinals	T
1963	19	259	Jim Turner	Washington Redskins	QB
1964	1	7	Bill Munson	Los Angeles Rams	QB
1964	12	165	Jim McNaughton	New York Giants	E
1965	4	55	Jim Harris	Minnesota Vikings	T
1965	17	232	Veran Smith	Minnesota Vikings	B
1965	19	264	Roy Shivers	St. Louis Cardinals	RB
1966	10	147	Ron Sbranti	San Francisco 49ers	DE
1967	2	38	Spain Musgrove	Washington Redskins	DT
1967	2	42	Jim LeMoine	Buffalo Bills	TE
1967	3	74	Henry King	New York Jets	DB
1967	8	193	Mike Gold	St. Louis Cardinals	T
1967	15	389	Grant Martinsen	Buffalo Bills	DB
1968	1	13	MacArthur Lane	St. Louis Cardinals	RB
1968	2	28	Bill Staley	Cincinnati Bengals	DE
1968	10	257	Ocie Austin	Baltimore Colts	DB
1968	16	424	Jim Murphy	Chicago Bears	K
1968	17	448	Joe Forzani	Philadelphia Eagles	LB
1969	2	34	Altie Taylor	Detroit Lions	RB
1969	5	112	Mike O'Shea	Minnesota Vikings	WR
1969	8	194	Doug Gosnell	Green Bay Packers	DT
1969	10	244	Jim Smith	Denver Broncos	DB
1970	1	4	Phil Olsen	Boston Patriots	DT
1970	13	327	Bernard Bradley	San Diego Chargers	DB
1971	12	299	Wesley Garnett	San Diego Chargers	WR
1971	14	361	Bill Dunstan	San Francisco 49ers	DE
1971	14	363	Tyrone Covey	Dallas Cowboys	DB
1972	8	188	Bob Wicks	St. Louis Cardinals	WR
1973	11	269	Elton Brown	Denver Broncos	DE
1973	14	343	Tony Adams	San Diego Chargers	QB
1974	11	268	Archie Gibson	New England Patriots	RB
1975	13	321	Bob Fuhriman	Green Bay Packers	DB
1976	3	91	Steve Maughan	Tampa Bay Buccaneers	LB
1976	5	127	Scott Parrish	New Orleans Saints	T
1976	6	176	Orlando Nelson	Cincinnati Bengals	TE
1976	8	214	Louie Giammona	New York Jets	RB
1976	15	404	Bob Dzierzak	Tampa Bay Buccaneers	DT
1976	15	423	Ron Holmes	Miami Dolphins	RB
1978	4	100	Jim Hough	Minnesota Vikings	C
1978	9	228	Keith Myers	Green Bay Packers	QB
1979	8	193	Ron Cassidy	Green Bay Packers	WR
1979	9	235	John Thompson	Green Bay Packers	TE
1979	9	239	Dave Parkin	Atlanta Falcons	DB
1980	2	42	Rulon Jones	Denver Broncos	DE
1980	4	85	Eric Hipple	Detroit Lions	QB
1980	4	107	Rick Parros	Denver Broncos	RB
1980	7	182	Craig Bradshaw	Houston Oilers	QB
1980	10	251	Henry Henderson	Detroit Lions	DB
1981	10	266	James Murphy	Minnesota Vikings	WR
1981	12	319	Bob Gagliano	Kansas City Chiefs	QB
1982	6	155	Mike Perko	Pittsburgh Steelers	DT
1982	10	278	Larry Hogue	Cincinnati Bengals	DB
1983	12	325	Maurice Turner	Minnesota Vikings	RB
1984	4	100	Patrick Allen	Houston Oilers	DB
1984	5	127	Andy Parker	Los Angeles Raiders	TE
1984	6	159	Aaron Smith	Denver Broncos	LB
1984	12	329	Theodis Windham	Seattle Seahawks	DB
1985	3	63	Hal Garner	Buffalo Bills	LB
1985	6	141	Mike Hamby	Buffalo Bills	DT
1986	6	157	Solomon Miller	New York Giants	WR
1986	7	183	Ed Berry	Green Bay Packers	DB
1987	5	125	Mark Mraz	Atlanta Falcons	DE
1987	6	147	Al Smith	Houston Oilers	LB
1989	7	192	Brent Snyder	Chicago Bears	QB
1989	7	194	Kendall Smith	Cincinnati Bengals	WR
1990	10	249	Patrick Newman	Minnesota Vikings	WR
1999	4	126	Johndale Carty	Atlanta Falcons	DB
2003	3	74	Kevin Curtis	St. Louis Rams	WR
2004	3	81	Chris Cooley	Washington Redskins	TE
2008	4	110	Shawn Murphy	Miami Dolphins	G
2008	6	182	Kevin Robinson	Kansas City Chiefs	WR
2011	3	90	Curtis Marsh Jr.	Philadelphia Eagles	DB
2012	2	47	Bobby Wagner	Seattle Seahawks	LB
2012	4	106	Robert Turbin	Seattle Seahawks	RB
2012	7	212	Michael Smith	Tampa Bay Buccaneers	RB
2013	3	93	Will Davis	Miami Dolphins	DB
2013	7	230	Kerwynn Williams	Indianapolis Colts	RB
2014	4	110	Mo Alexander	St. Louis Rams	DB
2014	4	133	Nevin Lawson	Detroit Lions	DB
2016	3	87	Nick Vigil	Cincinnati Bengals	LB
2016	3	88	Kyler Fackrell	Green Bay Packers	LB
2017	7	238	Devante Mays	Green Bay Packers	RB
2019	6	214	Darwin Thompson	Kansas City Chiefs	RB
2020	1	26	Jordan Love	Green Bay Packers	QB
2025	4	133	Jalen Royals	Kansas City Chiefs	WR

== Notable undrafted players ==
Note: No drafts held before 1936

Debut year	Player name	Position	Debut NFL/AFL team	Notes
1961	Buddy Allen	RB	Denver Broncos	—
1962	Cornell Green	CB	Dallas Cowboys	—
1962	Mel Montalbo	DB	Oakland Raiders	—
1965	Earsell Mackbee	CB	Minnesota Vikings	—
1970	Chuck Detwiler	DB	San Diego Chargers	—
1973	Steve Kinney	T	Chicago Bears	—
1982	Ken Thompson	WR	St. Louis Cardinals	—
1984	Shawn Miller	DE	Los Angeles Rams	—
1985	Greg Kragen	NT	Denver Broncos	—
1987	Willie Beecher	K	Miami Dolphins	—
1987	Matt Hanousek	T	Seattle Seahawks	—
1987	Paul Lavine	LB	Seattle Seahawks	—
1987	Greg Sinnott	T	Los Angeles Rams	—
1987	Peter Tuiasosopo	C	St. Louis Cardinals	—
1987	Kevin Young	DE	New Orleans Saints	—
1989	Louie Aguiar	P	Buffalo Bills	—
1993	Israel Byrd	DB	New Orleans Saints	—
1994	Jed DeVries	T	Seattle Seahawks	—
1994	Rich Tylski	G	New England Patriots	—
1996	Kevin Alexander	WR	New York Giants	—
1999	Craig Miller	DB	Indianapolis Colts	—
2000	Micah Knorr	P	Dallas Cowboys	—
2002	Tony Newson	LB	Kansas City Chiefs	—
2003	Ade Jimoh	DB	Washington Redskins	—
2003	Jim Newton	T	Indianapolis Colts	—
2004	Trevor Hutton	G	Indianapolis Colts	—
2006	Jarrett Bush	CB	Carolina Panthers	—
2006	John Chick	DE	Houston Texans	—
2006	Donald Penn	T	Minnesota Vikings	—
2009	De'von Hall	S	Minnesota Vikings	—
2009	Rob Myers	TE	New York Jets	—
2011	Patrick Scales	LS	Baltimore Ravens	—
2014	Bojay Filimoeatu	LB	Oakland Raiders	—
2014	Tay Glover-Wright	CB	Atlanta Falcons	—
2014	Tyler Larsen	C	Miami Dolphins	—
2014	D. J. Tialavea	TE	Jacksonville Jaguars	—
2015	Zach Vigil	LB	Miami Dolphins	—
2016	Marwin Evans	S	Green Bay Packers	—
2016	Hunter Sharp	WR	Philadelphia Eagles	—
2018	Jalen Davis	CB	Miami Dolphins	—
2018	Dallin Leavitt	S	Oakland Raiders	—
2020	Dominik Eberle	K	Las Vegas Raiders	—
2020	Tipa Galeai	LB	Green Bay Packers	—
2020	Deven Thompkins	WR	Tampa Bay Buccaneers	—
2026	Noah Avinger	S	Los Angeles Chargers	—
2026	Brady Boyd	WR	Jacksonville Jaguars	—
2026	Miles Davis	RB	Carolina Panthers	—
