= 1997 New York Giants season =

NFL team season

- Head coach: Jim Fassel
- Offensive coordinator: Ernie Zampese
- Defensive coordinator: Dave Campo
- Home stadium: Giants Stadium

Results
- Record: 10–5–1
- Division place: 1st NFC East
- Playoffs: Lost Wild Card Playoffs (vs. Vikings) 22–23
- Pro Bowlers: 2: DE Michael Strahan; LB Jessie Armstead

The 1997 New York Giants season was the franchise's 73rd season in the National Football League (NFL) and the first under head coach Jim Fassel, who replaced Dan Reeves after four seasons.

The Giants improved upon their previous season's output of 6–10. They managed to achieve a 10–5–1 record, the Giants’ best mark since 1993, and won the NFC East for the first time since their 1990 Super Bowl season. Despite winning the division title and earning a home playoff game, the Giants were eliminated in their Wild Card Round matchup by the Minnesota Vikings 23–22.

== Offseason ==
=== NFL draft ===
1997 New York Giants draft
Round	Pick	Player	Position	College	Notes
1	7	Ike Hilliard	WR	Florida	
2	36	Tiki Barber *	RB	Virginia	
3	68	Ryan Phillips	LB	Idaho	
3	95	Brad Maynard	P	Ball State	
4	103	Pete Monty	LB	Wisconsin	
5	136	Sam Garnes	S	Cincinnati	
6	171	Mike Cherry	QB	Murray State	
7	208	Matt Keneley	DT	USC	
Made roster † Pro Football Hall of Fame * Made at least one Pro Bowl during career

== Roster ==
1997 New York Giants roster
Quarterbacks (QB): 17 Dave Brown; 18 Mike Cherry; 13 Danny Kanell; Running backs (RB): 21 Tiki Barber; 27 Rodney Hampton; 37 Eric Lane; 33 Erric Pegram; 30 Charles Way FB; 28 Tyrone Wheatley; Wide receivers (WR): 86 Kevin Alexander; 80 Chris Calloway; 83 David Patten; 89 Amani Toomer; Tight ends (TE): 87 Howard Cross; 84 Aaron Pierce	Offensive linemen (OL): 78 Greg Bishop G; 69 Derek Engler C; 74 Scott Gragg T; 70 Roman Oben T; 66 Jerry Reynolds T; 53 Lance Scott C; 60 Bryan Stoltenberg C; 65 Ron Stone G; 73 Rob Zatechka G; Defensive linemen (DL): 93 Ray Agnew DT; 95 Antonio Edwards DE; 75 Keith Hamilton DT; 97 Robert Harris DE; 79 Bernard Holsey DE/DT; 99 Christian Peter DT; 92 Michael Strahan DE	Linebackers (LB): 98 Jessie Armstead OLB; 55 Marcus Buckley OLB; 58 Doug Colman MLB; 52 Scott Galyon MLB; 57 Corey Miller OLB; 91 Ryan Phillips OLB; 90 Corey Widmer MLB; Defensive backs (DB): 43 Percy Ellsworth SS; 20 Sam Garnes SS; 41 Conrad Hamilton CB; 44 Robert Massey CB; 23 Thomas Randolph CB; 34 Brandon Sanders SS; 31 Jason Sehorn CB; 22 Phillippi Sparks CB; 29 Tito Wooten FS; 47 Rodney Young FS; Special teams (ST): 3 Brad Daluiso K; 9 Brad Maynard P	Practice squad: 26 Kory Blackwell CB; 67 Justin Chabot G; 85 Brian Gaine TE; 45 Robert Walker RB; Reserve: 77 Chad Bratzke DE (IR); 82 Omar Douglas WR (IR); 88 Ike Hilliard WR (IR); 48 Brandon Jessie TE (IR); 94 Cedric Jones DE (IR); 81 Thomas Lewis WR (IR); -- Typail McMullen S (IR); 51 Pete Monty LB (IR); 10 Brian Roberson WR (IR); 8 Stan White QB (NF-Inj.); 59 Brian Williams C (IR); Rookies in italics 50 active, 11 reserve, 4 practice squad

== Preseason ==
Week	Date	Opponent	Result	Record	Venue
1	August 2	at Baltimore Ravens	W 21–20	1–0	Memorial Stadium
2	August 9	Jacksonville Jaguars	L 16–38	1–1	Giants Stadium
3	August 16	New York Jets	L 17–27	1–2	Giants Stadium
4	August 22	at Green Bay Packers	L 17–22	1–3	Camp Randall Stadium (Madison, Wisconsin)

== Regular season ==
=== Schedule ===
Week	Date	Opponent	Result	Record	Venue	Recap
1	August 31	**Philadelphia Eagles**	**W** 31–17	1–0	Giants Stadium	Recap
2	September 7	at Jacksonville Jaguars	**L** 13–40	1–1	Alltel Stadium	Recap
3	September 14	Baltimore Ravens	**L** 23–24	1–2	Giants Stadium	Recap
4	September 21	at St. Louis Rams	**L** 3–13	1–3	Trans World Dome	Recap
5	September 28	New Orleans Saints	**W** 14–9	2–3	Giants Stadium	Recap
6	October 5	**Dallas Cowboys**	**W** 20–17	3–3	Giants Stadium	Recap
7	October 12	at **Arizona Cardinals**	**W** 27–13	4–3	Sun Devil Stadium	Recap
8	October 19	at Detroit Lions	**W** 26–20 (OT)	5–3	Pontiac Silverdome	Recap
9	October 26	Cincinnati Bengals	**W** 29–27	6–3	Giants Stadium	Recap
10	Bye					
11	November 9	at Tennessee Oilers	**L** 6–10	6–4	Liberty Bowl Memorial Stadium	Recap
12	November 16	**Arizona Cardinals**	**W** 19–10	7–4	Giants Stadium	Recap
13	November 23	at **Washington Redskins**	**T** 7–7 (OT)	7–4–1	Jack Kent Cooke Stadium	Recap
14	November 30	Tampa Bay Buccaneers	**L** 8–20	7–5–1	Giants Stadium	Recap
15	December 7	at **Philadelphia Eagles**	**W** 31–21	8–5–1	Veterans Stadium	Recap
16	December 13	**Washington Redskins**	**W** 30–10	9–5–1	Giants Stadium	Recap
17	December 21	at **Dallas Cowboys**	**W** 20–7	10–5–1	Texas Stadium	Recap
Note: Intra-division opponents are in **bold** text.

=== Game summaries ===
==== Week 1: vs. Philadelphia Eagles ====
Week 1: Philadelphia Eagles at New York Giants – Game summary

Quarter	1	2	3	4	Total
Eagles	3	0	7	7	**17**
**Giants**	7	7	10	7	**31**

at Giants Stadium, East Rutherford, New Jersey

- Date: August 31
- Game time: 1:00 p.m. EDT
- Game weather: Partly sunny, 75 °F (24 °C)
- Game attendance: 70,296
- Referee: Mike Carey
- TV announcers (Fox): Dick Stockton, Matt Millen and Curt Menefee

Game information

**First quarter**

- NYG – Dave Brown 3-yard run (Brad Daluiso kick), 7:52. Giants 7–0. **Drive: 4 plays, 70 yards, 1:37.**
- PHI – Chris Boniol 48-yard field goal, 1:39. Giants 7–3. **Drive: 13 plays, 49 yards, 6:13.**

**Second quarter**

- NYG – Chris Calloway 9-yard pass from Dave Brown (Brad Daluiso kick), 0:06. Giants 14–3. **Drive: 5 plays, 60 yards, 1:32.**

**Third quarter**

- NYG – Tiki Barber 1-yard run (Brad Daluiso kick), 14:02. Giants 21–3. **Drive: 2 plays, 8 yards, 0:58.**
- NYG – Brad Daluiso 39-yard field goal, 6:43. Giants 24–3. **Drive: 9 plays, 32 yards, 3:47.**
- PHI – Ricky Watters 3-yard run (Chris Boniol kick), 1:27. Giants 24–10. **Drive: 10 plays, 81 yards, 5:16.**

**Fourth quarter**

- PHI – Kevin Turner 14-yard pass from Rodney Peete (Chris Boniol kick), 8:15. Giants 24–17. **Drive: 10 plays, 68 yards, 5:33.**
- NYG – Sam Garnes 95-yard interception return (Brad Daluiso kick), 4:58. Giants 31–17.

**Top passers**

- PHI – Rodney Peete – 17/23, 268 yards, TD, INT
- NYG – Dave Brown – 13/27, 193 yards, TD

**Top rushers**

- PHI – Ricky Watters – 18 rushes, 81 yards, TD
- NYG – Tiki Barber – 20 rushes, 88 yards, TD

**Top receivers**

- PHI – Michael Timpson – 9 receptions, 125 yards
- NYG – Charles Way – 3 receptions, 63 yards

Despite being projected by many to finish last place in the NFC East after going 6–10 in 1996 and boasting the NFL's youngest roster, the Giants secured a victory in their first regular season game under new head coach Jim Fassel on his 48th birthday against their division rivals the Eagles, whom they had lost to in four straight meetings. Although they were outgained in first downs (24–12), total yards (447–290) and time of possession (35:31–24:29), New York won the turnover battle (2–0) and controlled the game at the line of scrimmage.

After posting one of the lowest-scoring offenses and having one of the most ineffective pass rushing units in '96, the Giants collected nine sacks against Philadelphia's quarterbacks, with Michael Strahan picking up 2.5, while the offense hit big early with Dave Brown finding Charles Way out of the backfield for a 62-yard catch-and-run on their second possession; this led to Brown scoring a touchdown on a quarterback draw three plays later.

After Chris Boniol kicked a 48-yard field goal for the Eagles, the Giants maintained a 7–3 lead late in the first half, with a Scott Galyon pass deflection and Keith Hamilton's sack spoiling drives, before rookie Tiki Barber—one of five Giant rookies starting the game—ran for a 21-yard gain and then caught a pass from Brown for 28 yards. With six seconds remaining, Brown then hit Chris Calloway for a touchdown.

The Giants continued their momentum on the opening kickoff of the third quarter, with Thomas Lewis sprinting 84 yards to the Eagle 8-yard line; two plays later, Barber scored his first NFL touchdown. After a 39-yard Brad Daluiso field goal made the score 24–3, the Eagles replaced starting quarterback Ty Detmer with Rodney Peete, who immediately led them on an 81-yard drive, capped off by a touchdown run by Ricky Watters. In the fourth quarter, Peete completed five consecutive passes, finding Kevin Turner on a contested pass for a 14-yard touchdown, cutting New York's lead to 24–17 with 8:15 remaining.

After the Giants went three-and-out, Watters gained 25 yards on back-to-back carries to put Philadelphia on the edge of the red zone. But Peete's next pass was intercepted by rookie safety Sam Garnes, who raced 95 yards for a back-breaking touchdown. Any comeback hopes were quelled on the next possession, as New York's pass rush of Strahan and fellow defensive end Chad Bratzke combined to sack Peete three times, forcing a fumble that was recovered by Hamilton.

The Giants' nine sacks marked nearly a third of their entire 1996 total (30), also marking a successful debut for new defensive coordinator John Fox. With the win, Fassel became their third consecutive head coach to win his debut after Dan Reeves and Ray Handley, and the first NFL head coach to win his debut on his birthday.

==== Week 2: at Jacksonville Jaguars ====
Week 2: New York Giants at Jacksonville Jaguars – Game summary

Quarter	1	2	3	4	Total
Giants	7	0	6	0	**13**
**Jaguars**	0	20	3	17	**40**

at Alltel Stadium, Jacksonville, Florida

- Date: September 7
- Game time: 4:00 p.m. EDT
- Game weather: Partly cloudy, 79 °F (26 °C)
- Game attendance: 70,581
- Referee: Dick Hantak
- TV announcers (Fox): Kevin Harlan and Jerry Glanville

Game information

**First quarter**

- NYG – Tiki Barber 4-yard run (Brad Daluiso kick), 2:29. Giants 7–0. **Drive: 2 plays, 27 yards, 0:54.**

**Second quarter**

- JAC – Mike Hollis 29-yard field goal, 14:14. Giants 7–3. **Drive: 6 plays, 69 yards, 3:15.**
- JAC – James Stewart 1-yard run (Mike Hollis kick), 10:52. Jaguars 10–7. **Drive: 6 plays, 16 yards, 2:59.**
- JAC – Natrone Means 9-yard run (Mike Hollis kick), 3:12. Jaguars 17–7. **Drive: 13 plays, 82 yards, 6:32.**
- JAC – Mike Hollis 52-yard field goal, 0:00. Jaguars 20–7. **Drive: 5 plays, 33 yards, 0:56.**

**Third quarter**

- JAC – Mike Hollis 35-yard field goal, 2:45. Jaguars 23–7. **Drive: 8 plays, 41 yards, 5:27.**
- NYG – Chris Calloway 8-yard pass from Dave Brown (pass failed), 0:30. Jaguars 23–13. **Drive: 4 plays, 72 yards, 2:15.**

**Fourth quarter**

- JAC – Mike Hollis 42-yard field goal, 9:43. Jaguars 26–13. **Drive: 5 plays, 39 yards, 2:53.**
- JAC – Natrone Means 5-yard run (Mike Hollis kick), 5:56. Jaguars 33–13. **Drive: 6 plays, 52 yards, 2:52.**
- JAC – James Stewart 12-yard run (Mike Hollis kick), 1:55. Jaguars 40–13. **Drive: 6 plays, 27 yards, 2:40.**

**Top passers**

- NYG – Dave Brown – 16/35, 182 yards, TD, INT
- JAC – Steve Matthews – 23/35, 252 yards

**Top rushers**

- NYG – Tiki Barber – 11 rushes, 17 yards, TD
- JAC – Natrone Means – 24 rushes, 85 yards, 2 TD

**Top receivers**

- NYG – Tiki Barber – 3 receptions, 43 yards
- JAC – Jimmy Smith – 8 receptions, 117 yards, TD

After an opening day victory, the Giants traveled south to face the Jaguars, the AFC Championship Game participants of a season ago, who were forced into playing their third-string quarterback, with starter Mark Brunell and backup Rob Johnson out with injuries. Former seventh-round draft pick Steve Matthews was making his first and only NFL start, but New York stumbled through an eventual blowout due to a lethargic offense that was shredded in the time of possession battle (39:39-20:21).

Neither team crossed midfield on each of their first three drives before Keith Hamilton sacked Matthews and forced a fumble that was recovered by linebacker Marcus Buckley, setting up the Giants at Jacksonville's 27-yard line. A sliding 23-yard catch by rookie wide receiver Ike Hilliard led to a Tiki Barber touchdown; however, Hilliard suffered a sprained neck ligament making the catch, which not only took him out of the game, but forced the seventh overall draft pick to miss the remainder of the season due to spinal instability.

Very little went right for the Giants after that. A 43-yard pass to Keenan McCardell led to a Mike Hollis field goal at the start of the second quarter. On the next play from scrimmage, Barber fumbled the ball, which was recovered by safety Travis Davis. Five plays later, Matthews's third-down pass was intercepted in the end zone by linebacker Corey Widmer, but defensive back Thomas Randolph was flagged for pass interference. James Stewart then hurdled into the end zone to give the Jaguars a 10–7 lead.

After a Giants punt, Matthews led Jacksonville on a 13-play, 82-yard drive, often victimizing Randolph—filling in for the ill Phillippi Sparks and injured Conrad Hamilton—with the passing game. On 4th-and-1 from the 9-yard line, Natrone Means broke loose for a touchdown. With less than two minutes remaining in the first half, New York took over in Jaguars territory, and reached the 30-yard line. But on Dave Brown's pass to tight end Howard Cross, he was hit and fumbled the ball, and rookie defensive end Renaldo Wynn recovered. A 21-yard pass to wide receiver Willie Jackson led to a 52-yard Hollis field goal, stretching Jacksonville's lead to 20–7 at halftime.

On Jacksonville's second drive of the third quarter, the running of Means and Stewart led to another Hollis field goal. After that, the Giants finally achieved a sustained drive, as Brown hit Barber down the left sideline for a 29-yard gain. A pass interference call on cornerback Deon Figures put the ball at the 8, where Brown found Chris Calloway for a touchdown; a failed two-point conversion kept the score 23–13.

In the fourth quarter, the floodgates opened, as Matthews completed a 41-yard pass to Jimmy Smith, who again beat Randolph on the play. That set up Hollis's fourth field goal; two plays later, Brown was intercepted by Davis, which led to Means scoring his second touchdown. Stewart added another of his own in the closing minutes to complete the scoring.

After a successful debut, Barber only rushed for 17 yards on 11 carries, while Brown and the passing game were undone by drops and poor decision-making, with the offense only converting on 2-of-12 3rd downs and gaining 206 yards from scrimmage.

==== Week 3: vs. Baltimore Ravens ====
Week 3: Baltimore Ravens at New York Giants – Game summary

Quarter	1	2	3	4	Total
**Ravens**	7	7	0	10	**24**
Giants	0	12	8	3	**23**

at Giants Stadium, East Rutherford, New Jersey

- Date: September 14
- Game time: 1:00 p.m. EDT
- Game weather: Mostly sunny, 72 °F (22 °C)
- Game attendance: 69,768
- Referee: Bob McElwee
- TV announcers (NBC): Marv Albert, Randy Cross and Len Berman

Game information

**First quarter**

- BAL – Derrick Alexander 22-yard pass from Vinny Testaverde (Matt Stover kick), 10:46. Ravens 7–0. **Drive: 6 plays, 56 yards, 3:08.**

**Second quarter**

- NYG – Tiki Barber 1-yard run (Brad Daluiso kick blocked), 14:30. Ravens 7–6. **Drive: 10 plays, 49 yards, 4:02.**
- BAL – Jay Graham 1-yard run (Matt Stover kick), 3:12. Ravens 14–6. **Drive: 5 plays, 69 yards, 2:11.**
- NYG – Charles Way 1-yard pass from Dave Brown (pass failed), 0:14. Ravens 14–12. **Drive: 10 plays, 67 yards, 2:58.**

**Third quarter**

- NYG – Tyrone Wheatley 1-yard run (Brown-Barber pass), 9:13. Giants 20–14. **Drive: 11 plays, 61 yards, 4:44.**

**Fourth quarter**

- NYG – Brad Daluiso 27-yard field goal, 12:22. Giants 23–14. **Drive: 11 plays, 69 yards, 4:55.**
- BAL – Michael Jackson 11-yard pass from Vinny Testaverde (Matt Stover kick), 7:08. Giants 23–21. **Drive: 10 plays, 83 yards, 3:10.**
- BAL – Matt Stover 37-yard field goal, 0:34. Ravens 24–23. **Drive: 8 plays, 48 yards, 2:25.**

**Top passers**

- BAL – Vinny Testaverde – 22/35, 223 yards, 2 TD, INT
- NYG – Dave Brown – 28/46, 269 yards, TD

**Top rushers**

- BAL – Earnest Byner – 13 rushes, 57 yards
- NYG – Tiki Barber – 16 rushes, 64 yards, TD

**Top receivers**

- BAL – Michael Jackson – 5 receptions, 72 yards, TD
- NYG – Chris Calloway – 8 receptions, 79 yards

Despite earning a season-high 29 first downs and winning nearly every major statistical category, the Giants dropped a 24-23 decision to the Ravens due to special teams blunders and a couple of late defensive breakdowns.

Baltimore struck first on their initial drive, as Earnest Byner gained 27 yards on four straight touches before Vinny Testaverde completed a 22-yard touchdown pass to wide receiver Derrick Alexander. Late in the first quarter, Dave Brown completed three straight passes to put the ball on the 1-yard line, where Tiki Barber scored his third touchdown in as many games; however, Brad Daluiso's extra point attempt was blocked by Rob Burnett.

On the Giants' next drive, after an interception was nullified by penalty, a 27-yard pass to Amani Toomer on 3rd-and-7 put them in field goal range; however, Daluiso's 41-yard kick missed wide right. Two plays later, Testaverde hit Michael Jackson for a 34-yard gain, setting Baltimore up at the 1. New York stopped them on three plays before rookie running back Jay Graham finally scored to extend their lead to 14–6. Late in the first half, Brown completed 8-of-9 passes on a 67-yard drive, the last one a touchdown toss to Charles Way with 14 seconds left. Their two-point conversion attempt failed, so they trailed 14–12 at halftime.

In the third quarter, the running of Barber and veteran Tyrone Wheatley keyed a 61-yard drive, with the Giants benefitting when an apparent Barber fumble was ruled a stoppage of forward progress. Wheatley scored from the 1, and Brown completed a pass to Barber for two points, putting New York up 20–14. Later in the period, Testaverde was intercepted by safety Percy Ellsworth; soon after, Brown hit Howard Cross for 26 yards and wide receiver Kevin Alexander for 20 to put the Giants in the red zone. A 27-yard field goal by Daluiso put the Giants ahead by nine early in the fourth.

After both teams went three-and-out, Testaverde led the Ravens on an 83-yard march, including a 34-yard pass to tight end Eric Green. Three plays later, he found Jackson in the corner of the end zone for a touchdown to make the score 23–21. On the ensuing drive, Barber was stopped on 3rd-and-1 at Baltimore's 24, and Daluiso missed another 41-yard field goal wide right.

With three minutes remaining, Baltimore took over; Testaverde dropped the ball on the first play as he pulled back from center Leo Goeas, but it bounced right back to him and he ran for an 11-yard gain. A 12-yard run by Byner and an 11-yard catch by Green set up Stover—a member of the Giants' 1990 Super Bowl roster—for a game-winning 37-yard field goal with 34 seconds left.

The loss spoiled a solid game for Brown, who threw for 269 yards while completing passes to nine different receivers; Chris Calloway led with eight catches for 79 yards. It was the Ravens' first road win since their move from Cleveland prior to the 1996 season.

==== Week 4: at St. Louis Rams ====
Week 4: New York Giants at St. Louis Rams – Game summary

Quarter	1	2	3	4	Total
Giants	0	0	0	3	**3**
**Rams**	0	6	0	7	**13**

at Trans World Dome, St. Louis, Missouri

- Date: September 21
- Game time: 4:00 p.m. EDT/3:00 p.m. CDT
- Game weather: None (indoor stadium)
- Game attendance: 64,642
- Referee: Jerry Markbreit
- TV announcers (Fox): Dick Stockton and Matt Millen

Game information

**First quarter**

- No scoring plays.

**Second quarter**

- STL – Jeff Wilkins 23-yard field goal, 9:27. Rams 3–0. **Drive: 12 plays, 39 yards, 5:56.**
- STL – Jeff Wilkins 21-yard field goal, 0:13. Rams 6–0. **Drive: 13 plays, 64 yards, 4:31.**

**Third quarter**

- No scoring plays.

**Fourth quarter**

- NYG – Brad Daluiso 47-yard field goal, 13:26. Rams 6–3. **Drive: 6 plays, 19 yards, 1:39.**
- STL – Craig Heyward 4-yard run (Jeff Wilkins kick), 2:42. Rams 13–3. **Drive: 7 plays, 36 yards, 2:35.**

**Top passers**

- NYG – Dave Brown – 16/31, 163 yards, INT
- STL – Tony Banks – 15/35, 176 yards

**Top rushers**

- NYG – Charles Way – 6 rushes, 27 yards
- STL – Lawrence Phillips – 23 rushes, 72 yards

**Top receivers**

- NYG – Charles Way – 6 receptions, 69 yards
- STL – Amp Lee – 3 receptions, 58 yards

An ugly defensive struggle saw the Giants fall 13–3 to the Rams, in their first season under head coach and old Philadelphia nemesis Dick Vermeil, as they accumulated just 194 yards of total offense.

Their first play from scrimmage was a busted exchange that resulted in Dave Brown scrambling for seven yards and getting injured on the play. Two plays later, his replacement Danny Kanell was sacked and fumbled, and defensive tackle D'Marco Farr recovered for St. Louis. The defense forced a stop of Lawrence Phillips on 4th-and-1, but Tiki Barber was also injured on a hit that knocked the ball out shortly after; both he and Brown would return, however.

Early in the second quarter, Tony Banks completed passes to wide receivers Eddie Kennison and Torrance Small to drive the Rams into the red zone. He then hit tight end Ernie Conwell for a contested touchdown, but left tackle Wayne Gandy was flagged for illegal formation; they had to settle for a 23-yard Jeff Wilkins field goal. On the ensuing drive, Brown hit Charles Way on back-to-back plays for 34 yards; but it resulted in Brad Daluiso missing a 42-yard field goal, his second miss of the game and fourth in two games. Powered by the running of Phillips and the passing of Banks, St. Louis drove to New York's 3-yard line before being forced to another Wilkins field goal, making the halftime score 6–0.

A promising-looking drive at the start of the third quarter was ruined when left guard Greg Bishop was flagged for a late hit on a play where Way picked up a first down into Rams territory; instead the Giants were forced to punt. On their next drive, Brown's deep pass for Kevin Alexander was intercepted by safety Keith Lyle; however, Banks fumbled the snap on the next play and Chad Bratzke recovered, giving New York the ball at midfield. But after reaching the 32-yard line, right tackle Scott Gragg was flagged for a false start and an illegal cut block, which knocked them out of field goal range; Gragg would be penalized four times on the day.

Early in the fourth, a short field allowed the Giants to finally score on a 47-yard Daluiso field goal; with the score 6–3, the Rams burned six minutes off the clock on their next drive, as Banks hit Small for 31 yards and running back Amp Lee for 22. But after reaching New York's 23, Banks was sacked by Jessie Armstead and Michael Strahan on consecutive plays to kill the possession. However, the Giants failed to capitalize, and a short Brad Maynard punt put the Rams at New York's 36. After Banks connected with Conwell for 11 yards on 3rd-and-2, fullback Craig Heyward powered into the end zone to clinch a St. Louis win.

The loss dropped the Giants to 1–3, putting them in last place in the NFC East division, despite five sacks from the defense.

==== Week 5: vs. New Orleans Saints ====
Week 5: New Orleans Saints at New York Giants – Game summary

Quarter	1	2	3	4	Total
Saints	3	3	0	3	**9**
**Giants**	7	7	0	0	**14**

at Giants Stadium, East Rutherford, New Jersey

- Date: September 28
- Game time: 1:00 p.m. EDT
- Game weather: Mostly cloudy, 63 °F (17 °C)
- Game attendance: 68,891
- Referee: Ron Blum
- TV announcers (Fox): Joe Buck and Bill Maas

Game information

**First quarter**

- NYG – Kevin Alexander 32-yard pass from Dave Brown (Brad Daluiso kick), 5:48. Giants 7–0. **Drive: 1 play, 32 yards, 0:07.**
- NO – Doug Brien 36-yard field goal, 0:39. Giants 7–3. **Drive: 9 plays, 62 yards, 5:09.**

**Second quarter**

- NYG – Chris Calloway 14-yard pass from Dave Brown (Brad Daluiso kick), 5:02. Giants 14–3. **Drive: 12 plays, 84 yards, 6:16.**
- NO – Doug Brien 32-yard field goal, 1:56. Giants 14–6. **Drive: 7 plays, 44 yards, 3:06.**

**Third quarter**

- No scoring plays.

**Fourth quarter**

- NO – Doug Brien 39-yard field goal, 9:19. Giants 14–9. **Drive: 7 plays, 50 yards, 3:29.**

**Top passers**

- NO – Heath Shuler – 16/31, 203 yards, INT
- NYG – Dave Brown – 16/25, 194 yards, 2 TD, INT

**Top rushers**

- NO – Mario Bates – 18 rushes, 64 yards
- NYG – Tyrone Wheatley – 11 rushes, 60 yards

**Top receivers**

- NO – John Farquhar – 4 receptions, 82 yards
- NYG – Chris Calloway – 4 receptions, 63 yards, TD

The Giants snapped their three-game losing streak with a workmanlike win over the Saints. Despite team statistics being mostly equal, the Giants used their advantage in 3rd down conversions (7-of-15 to 1-of-12) and a fourth-quarter rushing attack to earn the victory.

On New Orleans's second drive, quarterback Heath Shuler was intercepted by Thomas Randolph in New York territory; however, Brad Daluiso missed another field goal shortly after. But after a 44-yard punt return by Amani Toomer, Dave Brown hit Kevin Alexander—starting for the injured Thomas Lewis—down the sideline for a 32-yard touchdown on the next play. Shuler responded by completing five straight passes, setting up a 36-yard field goal by Doug Brien.

The score was still 7–3 in the second quarter before Brown led a 12-play, 84-yard drive by completing eight passes to six different receivers, the last a 14-yard touchdown pass to Chris Calloway. Late in the first half, a 20-yard pass from Shuler to tight end John Farquhar led to Brien's second field goal, this one from 32 yards out.

In the third quarter, the Saints drove into Giants territory before Shuler fumbled the snap from center, and Keith Hamilton recovered. Later on, Brown's pass for Alexander was intercepted by safety Sammy Knight, and New Orleans drove to New York's 27-yard line; but the Giants held on 4th down, keeping the score 14-6 going into the fourth.

After a Giants punt, the passing of Shuler and running of Mario Bates put the Saints at the Giants' 26. But after a holding penalty on left guard Andy McCollum, they were forced to settle for another Brien field goal. After that, New York started running the ball with Tyrone Wheatley, with Tiki Barber out with a knee injury. But on 3rd-and-6 from New Orleans' 40, Brown was sacked by cornerback Alex Molden and fumbled, and defensive end Darren Mickell recovered, returning the ball to New York's 35.

A Shuler pass to wide receiver Randal Hill took the Saints to the 24; but cornerback Jason Sehorn dropped Bates for a two-yard loss, and Corey Widmer sacked Shuler to set up 3rd-and-21; safety Tito Wooten then broke up Shuler's pass for Andre Hastings, and the Saints punted with 3:45 remaining. From there, the combined running of Wheatley and Charles Way enabled the Giants to run the clock out and secure the win.

Despite the victory, Barber would be out the next four games with a torn knee ligament, while undrafted rookie center Derek Engler, filling in for injured longtime veteran Brian Williams, suffered a broken ankle, and would miss the remainder of the season.

==== Week 6: vs. Dallas Cowboys ====
Week 6: Dallas Cowboys at New York Giants – Game summary

Quarter	1	2	3	4	Total
Cowboys	3	3	3	8	**17**
**Giants**	0	3	10	7	**20**

at Giants Stadium, East Rutherford, New Jersey

- Date: October 5
- Game time: 1:00 p.m. EDT
- Game weather: Mostly sunny, 69 °F (21 °C)
- Game attendance: 77,137
- Referee: Ed Hochuli
- TV announcers (Fox): Dick Stockton and Matt Millen

Game information

**First quarter**

- DAL – Richie Cunningham 38-yard field goal, 8:52. Cowboys 3–0. **Drive: 10 plays, 61 yards, 6:08.**

**Second quarter**

- DAL – Richie Cunningham 31-yard field goal, 7:39. Cowboys 6–0. **Drive: 7 plays, 28 yards, 2:45.**
- NYG – Brad Daluiso 27-yard field goal, 0:12. Cowboys 6–3. **Drive: 10 plays, 63 yards, 3:17.**

**Third quarter**

- NYG – Brad Daluiso 22-yard field goal, 12:35. Tied 6–6. **Drive: 6 plays, 70 yards, 2:25.**
- DAL – Richie Cunningham 27-yard field goal, 7:36. Cowboys 9–6. **Drive: 9 plays, 71 yards, 4:59.**
- NYG – Tito Wooten 61-yard interception return. (Brad Daluiso kick), 0:40. Giants 13–9.

**Fourth quarter**

- NYG – Charles Way 3-yard run (Brad Daluiso kick), 6:18. Giants 20–9. **Drive: 2 plays, 33 yards, 0:33.**
- DAL – Anthony Miller 2-yard pass from Troy Aikman (Troy Aikman–Eric Bjornson pass), 1:54. Giants 20–17. **Drive: 14 plays, 75 yards, 4:24.**

**Top passers**

- DAL – Troy Aikman – 34/52, 317 yards, TD, 2 INT
- NYG – Danny Kanell – 10/17, 101 yards

**Top rushers**

- DAL – Emmitt Smith – 19 rushes, 91 yards
- NYG – Tyrone Wheatley – 16 rushes, 51 yards

**Top receivers**

- DAL – Michael Irvin – 6 receptions, 86 yards
- NYG – Tyrone Wheatley – 2 receptions, 38 yards

The Giants remained home to face the Cowboys, winners of eight of their previous 10 meetings, who were 3–1 and held a share of the division lead with Washington. Despite Dallas dominating in first downs (27–13), total yards (428–166) and time of possession (40:37–19:23), New York edged out a win thanks to their red zone defense, Dallas self-inflicting with 11 penalties, and again winning the turnover battle (2–0).

The tone was set on the first drive, as the running of Emmitt Smith and passing of Troy Aikman drove the Cowboys into the red zone. But a pass to Smith down to the 2-yard line was nullified by an illegal use of hands penalty on right tackle Erik Williams, and they would settle for a Richie Cunningham field goal. On their next possession, Aikman completed passes to Michael Irvin and Daryl Johnston as they reached New York's 24. But on 3rd-and-2, a pitch to Smith was stopped short of the first down, and Cunningham missed on his second field goal try.

Midway through the second quarter, an 18-yard pass to Anthony Miller set up Cunningham for a successful field goal, making the score 6–0. On the ensuing drive, Dave Brown—who came into the game with a strained pectoral muscle—aggravated it on a hit, and was removed from the game. Danny Kanell came in and promptly completed passes to Tyrone Wheatley, Kevin Alexander and Chris Calloway for 53 yards. That led to a 27-yard Brad Daluiso field goal just before halftime, trimming the Cowboys' lead to 6–3.

A screen pass to Wheatley picked up 27 yards on the first play of the third quarter; than Kanell's deep pass for Calloway drew a pass interference on cornerback Kevin Smith, which set up another Daluiso field goal. On the ensuing drive, Aikman hit Irvin deep for a 36-yard gain, putting Dallas back in the red zone. But again, the drive stalled at the 9-yard line, and Cunningham's third short field goal put the Cowboys back up 9–6.

After a New York punt, Aikman's pass over the middle was intercepted by Tito Wooten, who raced 61 yards for a go-ahead touchdown. Early in the fourth quarter, Wooten picked off another Aikman pass as the Cowboys approached midfield. It was still 13–9 with seven minutes left before Amani Toomer returned a Toby Gowin punt 37 yards to Dallas's 33; another interference call on Kevin Smith—given an additional flag for removing his helmet after the play—set up a Charles Way touchdown run, putting New York up 20–9 with 6:18 to go.

The Cowboys methodically drove back down the field, with Aikman completing 10-of-12 passes for 64 yards, the last one a 2-yard touchdown to Miller with 1:54 remaining. The two-point conversion was good on a pass to tight end Eric Bjornson, cutting New York's lead to 20–17. With two time-outs left, Dallas kicked away deep, and undrafted rookie David Patten muffed the ball, which scattered loose on the turf; but Wheatley jumped on it at the 14-yard line to save the possession.

After a three-and-out, Brad Maynard punted away from his end zone to Deion Sanders, who attempted a reverse handoff to Kevin Mathis; but Patten disrupted the exchange, and the Cowboys lost eight yards back to their own 36. A 3rd-and-10 pass to wide receiver Stepfret Williams picked up 15 yards, putting the ball across midfield, where Aikman spiked the ball to stop the clock with 18 seconds to go.

Aikman completed his next pass down the middle to Bjornson, who picked up 32 yards to the Giants' 17 with the clock running. The teams raced to the line of scrimmage, where Aikman snapped the ball and spiked it with one second remaining; but Erik Williams was not set before the snap, and was flagged for a false start, which required a 10-second runoff with no time-outs inside the last two minutes of the half, ending the game in a 20–17 final.

With the win, the Giants moved to 3-3, a half-game behind the Cowboys and Redskins in the NFC East. Jessie Armstead recorded 18 tackles, while the injured Brown would remain sidelined in favor of Kanell.

==== Week 7: at Arizona Cardinals ====
Week 7: New York Giants at Arizona Cardinals – Game summary

Quarter	1	2	3	4	Total
**Giants**	3	3	7	14	**27**
Cardinals	0	6	0	7	**13**

at Sun Devil Stadium, Tempe, Arizona

- Date: October 12
- Game time: 4:00 p.m. EDT/2:00 p.m. MDT
- Game weather: Mostly sunny, 64 °F (18 °C)
- Game attendance: 38,959
- Referee: Phil Luckett
- TV announcers (Fox): Kenny Albert and Tim Green

Game information

**First quarter**

- NYG – Brad Daluiso 31-yard field goal, 10:16. Giants 3–0. **Drive: 12 plays, 58 yards, 4:44.**

**Second quarter**

- NYG – Brad Daluiso 48-yard field goal, 14:08. Giants 6–0. **Drive: 6 plays, 12 yards, 1:56.**
- ARI – Aeneas Williams 30-yard interception return (kick failed), 8:38. Tied 6–6.

**Third quarter**

- NYG – David Patten 9-yard pass from Danny Kanell (Brad Daluiso kick), 8:06. Giants 13–6. **Drive: 4 plays, 64 yards, 1:41.**

**Fourth quarter**

- NYG – Tyrone Wheatley 8-yard run (Brad Daluiso kick), 14:31. Giants 20–6. **Drive: 3 plays, 47 yards, 1:19.**
- NYG – Erric Pegram 18-yard run (Brad Daluiso kick), 5:04. Giants 27–6. **Drive: 8 plays, 85 yards, 5:25.**
- ARI – Stoney Case 1-yard run (Kevin Butler kick), 0:53. Giants 27–13. **Drive: 2 plays, 18 yards, 0:42.**

**Top passers**

- NYG – Danny Kanell – 13/28, 198 yards, TD, INT
- ARI – Stoney Case – 18/33, 222 yards, 2 INT

**Top rushers**

- NYG – Tyrone Wheatley – 22 rushes, 103 yards, TD
- ARI – LeShon Johnson – 2 rushes, 14 yards

**Top receivers**

- NYG – David Patten – 3 receptions, 66 yards, TD
- ARI – Rob Moore – 4 receptions, 87 yards

Against a Cardinals defense sporting Pro Bowl-caliber players in defensive end Simeon Rice, defensive tackle Eric Swann and linebacker Eric Hill, the Giants' offensive line dominated, allowing the running game to roll up a season-high 239 yards in Danny Kanell's first start, a 27–13 win to put them back over .500. It was Jim Fassel's first game back in Arizona, where he was the offensive coordinator in 1996.

The first drive featured Kanell converting on a pair of third downs with passes to Amani Toomer and Charles Way, which eventually led to a 31-yard Brad Daluiso field goal. Quarterback Kent Graham failed to generate any offense for Arizona, completing just 4-of-14 passes for 40 yards and interceptions to Tito Wooten and Percy Ellsworth, the second pick coming after they reached New York's 24-yard line.

But while the first pick led to another Daluiso field goal, Kanell answered Graham's turnover with one of his own, as cornerback Aeneas Williams jumped in front of Chris Calloway and returned the pass 30 yards for a touchdown. However, Kevin Butler missed the extra point, so the score remained tied at 6. On their next drive, Graham suffered a sprained ankle, and was replaced by Stoney Case just before halftime.

In the third quarter, after Case fumbled on a sack by defensive tackle Robert Harris and Chad Bratzke recovered, Kanell found Calloway on a deep pass for a 47-yard gain; two plays later, he hit David Patten for a touchdown, the first catch of his career. His next catch went for 23 yards, but a sack by safety Kwamie Lassiter halted the drive. But after Case hit Rob Moore for a 30-yard gain, Scott Galyon forced a fumble on a sack; Arizona recovered, but the play lost 30 yards.

Kanell hit Patten for another 34 yards to begin the fourth quarter, putting New York at the 8-yard line; Tyrone Wheatley scored on the next play to give the Giants a 20–6 lead. After a Cardinals punt, the Giants took over at their own 15 and drove 85 yards on eight consecutive running plays, with Way and Erric Pegram alternating carries. Pegram scored from the 18, and another Ellsworth interception kept Arizona from scoring any more than a meaningless Case touchdown.

Wheatley rushed for a career-high 103 yards on 22 carries, while Way added 91 on 13 carries, and the defense added another five sacks, as the Giants bumped their record to 4–3 with their first road win.

==== Week 8: at Detroit Lions ====
Week 8: New York Giants at Detroit Lions – Game summary

Quarter	1	2	3	4	OT	Total
**Giants**	7	3	7	3	6	**26**
Lions	0	10	3	7	0	**20**

at Pontiac Silverdome, Pontiac, Michigan

- Date: October 19
- Game time: 4:00 p.m. EDT
- Game weather: None (indoor stadium)
- Game attendance: 70,069
- Referee: Gerry Austin
- TV announcers (Fox): Pat Summerall, John Madden and Jennifer Hammond

Game information

**First quarter**

- NYG – Howard Cross 2-yard pass from Danny Kanell (Brad Daluiso kick), 7:04. Giants 7–0. **Drive: 3 plays, 8 yards, 1:07.**

**Second quarter**

- DET – Jason Hanson 22-yard field goal, 11:03. Giants 7–3. **Drive: 12 plays, 73 yards, 5:12.**
- DET – Barry Sanders 8-yard run (Jason Hanson kick), 5:07. Lions 10–7. **Drive: 7 plays, 59 yards, 4:14.**
- NYG – Brad Daluiso 52-yard field goal, 0:02. Tied 10–10. **Drive: 7 plays, 16 yards, 1:05.**

**Third quarter**

- NYG – Amani Toomer 53-yard punt return (Brad Daluiso kick), 9:24. Giants 17–10.
- DET – Jason Hanson 28-yard field goal, 4:12. Giants 17–13. **Drive: 11 plays, 58 yards, 5:12.**

**Fourth quarter**

- NYG – Brad Daluiso 47-yard field goal, 14:03. Giants 20–13. **Drive: 7 plays, 16 yards, 1:05.**
- DET – Johnnie Morton 4-yard pass from Scott Mitchell (Jason Hanson kick), 1:55. Tied 20–20. **Drive: 12 plays, 75 yards, 4:11.**

**Overtime**

- NYG – Chris Calloway 68-yard pass from Danny Kanell, 13:20. Giants 26–20. **Drive: 3 plays, 82 yards, 1:40.**

**Top passers**

- NYG – Danny Kanell – 17/31, 220 yards, 2 TD, INT
- DET – Scott Mitchell – 19/32, 243 yards, TD

**Top rushers**

- NYG – Charles Way – 13 rushes, 90 yards
- DET – Barry Sanders – 24 rushes, 105 yards, TD

**Top receivers**

- NYG – Chris Calloway – 5 receptions, 145 yards, TD
- DET – Herman Moore – 7 receptions, 88 yards

Danny Kanell's 68-yard pass to Chris Calloway on the third play of overtime gave the Giants a 26–20 win over the Lions, putting them at 5-3 and in sole possession of first place for the first time since 1993.

On New York's second possession of the game, Kanell's long pass for tight end Aaron Pierce was intercepted by safety Van Malone; however, Calloway managed to rip the ball out, and Charles Way recovered it to maintain possession. Three plays later, Kanell faked a handoff to Tyrone Wheatley and threw a touchdown pass to Howard Cross. Barry Sanders answered with a 37-yard run on the ensuing drive; but four plays later, Scott Mitchell fumbled the snap, and Robert Harris recovered.

Mitchell atoned on their next possession by hitting Johnnie Morton three times for 48 yards, and a 20-yard pass to Herman Moore took Detroit into the red zone. But a near-touchdown pass to rookie wide receiver Tommie Boyd was caught out of bounds, and they settled for a Jason Hanson field goal. After a New York punt, Sanders gashed them for 37 yards on four carries, scoring in elusive fashion from the 8-yard line and giving the Lions a 10–7 lead.

Kanell came back with a 39-yard completion to Calloway, but Wheatley was dropped for a four-yard loss and Kanell was flagged for intentional grounding to kill the series. But the defense forced a three-and-out, and Kanell completed passes to Calloway and Erric Pegram, which led to a 52-yard Brad Daluiso field goal with two seconds left in the first half, tying the game at 10.

The Lions punted on their first possession of the third quarter, but when linebacker Scott Kowalkowski was flagged for grabbing the face mask, the Giants elected to make them re-kick; Amani Toomer responded by maneuvering 53 yards up the right sideline for the go-ahead touchdown, the third via punt return of his career. Both teams then traded field goals, with Detroit riding the arm of Mitchell and New York powered by the running of Way. With just over six minutes left in the fourth, the Giants punted back, still leading 20–13.

Starting at their own 25-yard line, Mitchell was sacked by Harris on the first play but then hit Moore for 22 yards on 3rd-and-16; later he found fullback Tommy Vardell for 28 yards on 3rd-and-10. The Lions dinked-and-dunked down to the 4 until Mitchell faked a handoff to Sanders and completed a pass to Morton for the tying touchdown with 1:55 remaining. The Giants picked up a first down on a run by Pegram, but ended up punting inside Detroit's 10, and the game went to overtime.

On the first possession, a pass to Cross and a run by Way picked up a first down. Then Kanell threw long to Calloway down the right sideline, where he beat former Giant cornerback Corey Raymond to the catch and sprinted all the way for the winning touchdown.

With a career-high 145 yards and the game-winning touchdown on five catches, Calloway was named NFC Offensive Player of the Week, while Toomer was named NFC Special Teams Player of the Week. Sanders rushed for 105 yards, but only 25 of them came after halftime.

==== Week 9: vs. Cincinnati Bengals ====
Week 9: Cincinnati Bengals at New York Giants – Game summary

Quarter	1	2	3	4	Total
Bengals	7	14	0	6	**27**
**Giants**	3	7	6	13	**29**

at Giants Stadium, East Rutherford, New Jersey

- Date: October 26
- Game time: 1:00 p.m. EST
- Game weather: Mostly cloudy, 46 °F (8 °C)
- Game attendance: 72,584
- Referee: Bernie Kukar
- TV announcers (NBC): Mike Breen and James Lofton

Game information

**First quarter**

- NYG – Brad Daluiso 35-yard field goal, 10:37. Giants 3–0. **Drive: 10 plays, 58 yards, 4:23.**
- CIN – Corey Dillon 1-yard run (Doug Pelfrey kick), 6:23. Bengals 7–3. **Drive: 10 plays, 66 yards, 4:14.**

**Second quarter**

- NYG – Charles Way 1-yard run (Brad Daluiso kick), 14:50. Giants 10–7. **Drive: 9 plays, 49 yards, 3:42.**
- CIN – Eric Bieniemy 102-yard kickoff return. (Doug Pelfrey kick), 14:32. Bengals 14–10.
- CIN – David Dunn 39-yard pass from Jeff Blake (Doug Pelfrey kick), 0:06. Bengals 21–10. **Drive: 7 plays, 73 yards, 0:49.**

**Third quarter**

- NYG – Charles Way 1-yard run (run failed), 8:57. Bengals 21–16. **Drive: 8 plays, 23 yards, 4:29.**

**Fourth quarter**

- NYG – Tyrone Wheatley 1-yard run (pass failed), 14:08. Giants 22–21. **Drive: 6 plays, 62 yards, 2:52.**
- NYG – Tyrone Wheatley 3-yard run (Brad Daluiso kick), 3:24. Giants 29–21. **Drive: 7 plays, 69 yards, 4:15.**
- CIN – Jeff Blake 4-yard run (pass failed), 1:31. Giants 29–27. **Drive: 9 plays, 62 yards, 1:53.**

**Top passers**

- CIN – Jeff Blake – 17/34, 237 yards, TD, INT
- NYG – Danny Kanell – 18/31, 214 yards

**Top rushers**

- CIN – Ki-Jana Carter – 17 rushes, 70 yards
- NYG – Charles Way – 20 rushes, 75 yards, 2 TD

**Top receivers**

- CIN – David Dunn – 3 receptions, 61 yards, TD
- NYG – Kevin Alexander – 5 receptions, 100 yards

The Giants won their fifth straight game over the 1-6 Bengals, but the 29-27 outcome was not secure until Jason Sehorn stopped a late two-point conversion attempt and Chris Calloway recovered the ensuing onside kick.

After a 35-yard Brad Daluiso field goal on the opening drive, Cincinnati answered by handing off to Ki-Jana Carter five times for 24 yards, while Jeff Blake hit wide receiver James Hundon for a 21-yard gain. Corey Dillon then plunged in from the 1-yard line to give the Bengals the lead. Late in the first quarter, Charles Way converted on 4th-and-inches, and a pass interference penalty on cornerback Tito Paul set up Way for a short touchdown run.

However, Eric Bieniemy responded by taking the ensuing kickoff 102 yards for a touchdown; the score remained 14–10 Bengals in the final minute of the first half as Cincinnati took over at their own 27-yard line with one time-out left. Blake completed passes to Darnay Scott, David Dunn and Brian Milne, putting the ball at New York's 39 with 14 seconds to go. On 4th-and-5, rather than try a long field goal, Blake passed down the middle to Dunn, who took advantage of a poor tackling angle by Tito Wooten and went all the way to the end zone, giving Cincinnati a surprising 21–10 halftime lead.

But New York's fortunes quickly changed in the third quarter, as Blake fumbled on a tackle by Jessie Armstead, and Percy Ellsworth returned it to the Bengals' 23. After four straight runs, Paul was called for another pass interference to put the ball at the 3; then on 3rd-and-Goal from the 1, Danny Kanell threw incomplete to Howard Cross, but linebacker James Francis was called for holding, giving the Giants a first down. Two plays later, Way powered in for his second touchdown; but Kanell's two-point conversion failed, keeping the score 21–16.

The Bengals crossed midfield on their next two possessions, but both drives ended without points, as Blake was intercepted by Phillippi Sparks and then fumbled on a fourth-down sack by Michael Strahan. Way then fumbled on his next carry, but he was able to recover it. An additional three straight Way runs picked up 19 yards, setting up 3rd-and-5 from Cincinnati's 24 at the start of the fourth quarter. Kanell hit Calloway on a quick out pass, and he dashed down to the 1; Tyrone Wheatley scored on the next play, but the two-point conversion failed again.

Trailing 22–21, Cincinnati reached New York's 40 on the ensuing series; but on 4th-and-1, the pitch to Carter was stopped short by Armstead. Midway through the period, Kanell hit Kevin Alexander with a 40-yard pass, and then picked up a first down with a quarterback draw on 3rd-and-4. An interference penalty on cornerback Ashley Ambrose led to Wheatley's second touchdown, putting the Giants up 29–21 with 3:24 remaining.

From their own 38-yard line, the Bengals picked up 13 yards on a Wooten interference; Blake completed his next three passes, putting them into the red zone at the two-minute warning. A third-down completion to Hundon put the ball at the 4 with 1:43 and one time-out remaining; two plays later, Blake scrambled and stretched for a touchdown, cutting New York's lead to two. But on the two-point conversion attempt, Blake's left-corner fade pass for Carl Pickens was intercepted by Sehorn, and the desperation onside kick was fielded by Calloway, securing a New York win and Cincinnati's seventh straight loss.

Combined with losses by Washington and Dallas, the Giants gained a one and a half game advantage for first place in the division, going into their bye week at 6–3.

==== Week 11: at Tennessee Oilers ====
Week 11: New York Giants at Tennessee Oilers – Game summary

Quarter	1	2	3	4	Total
Giants	0	3	3	0	**6**
**Oilers**	3	7	0	0	**10**

at Liberty Bowl Memorial Stadium, Memphis, Tennessee

- Date: November 9
- Game time: 4:00 p.m. EST
- Game weather: Partly cloudy, 46 °F (8 °C)
- Game attendance: 26,744
- Referee: Walt Coleman
- TV announcers (Fox): Kenny Albert and Tim Green

Game information

**First quarter**

- TEN – Al Del Greco 31-yard field goal, 3:34. Oilers 3–0. **Drive: 12 plays, 64 yards, 8:09.**

**Second quarter**

- TEN – Eddie George 1-yard run (Al Del Greco kick), 0:50. Oilers 10–0. **Drive: 14 plays, 84 yards, 6:50.**
- NYG – Brad Daluiso 42-yard field goal, 0:00. Oilers 10–3. **Drive: 5 plays, 48 yards, 0:50.**

**Third quarter**

- NYG – Brad Daluiso 40-yard field goal, 4:54. Oilers 10–6. **Drive: 9 plays, 51 yards, 3:46.**

**Fourth quarter**

- No scoring plays.

**Top passers**

- NYG – Danny Kanell – 15/28, 133 yards, INT
- TEN – Steve McNair – 13/23, 183 yards, INT

**Top rushers**

- NYG – Tyrone Wheatley – 13 rushes, 94 yards
- TEN – Eddie George – 32 rushes, 122 yards, TD

**Top receivers**

- NYG – Chris Calloway – 4 receptions, 65 yards
- TEN – Chris Sanders – 3 receptions, 64 yards

Following the Giants' bye week, Jim Fassel announced Danny Kanell as the permanent starting quarterback, while Tiki Barber returned from injury. But they lost a rough, physical 10–6 game in Tennessee to snap their five-game winning streak.

On the Oilers' first possession, they mostly ran the ball with Eddie George and Steve McNair and took eight minutes off the clock, eventually settling for a 31-yard Al Del Greco field goal. George fumbled on the first play of their next drive and Tito Wooten recovered, but Kanell's next long pass off a flea-flicker was intercepted by safety Marcus Robertson. However, cornerback Darryll Lewis was called for pass interference, but Greg Bishop was flagged for grabbing the face mask on the return, so rather than getting the ball at Tennessee's 1-yard line, the offsetting calls wiped out the play altogether; New York would soon punt.

McNair hit wide receiver Chris Sanders for a 34-yard gain; but after reaching the Giants' 34, he was intercepted by Corey Widmer. However, New York's offense failed to capitalize, and the Oilers responded with a 14-play, 84-yard drive, as McNair overcame a 2nd-and-20 by finding wide receiver Derek Russell twice for 30 yards. George eventually scored from the 1, putting them up 10–0 with 50 seconds left in the first half. However, a 27-yard completion from Kanell to Chris Calloway led to a 42-yard Brad Daluiso field goal as time expired.

Midway through the third quarter, a 34-yard run by Tyrone Wheatley on 3rd-and-2 put the Giants in the red zone; but Amani Toomer and Kevin Alexander both dropped potential first-down catches, and they kicked another field goal. George ran Tennessee back into field goal range, but Del Greco missed his next try, this time from 44 yards out, to keep the score 10–6.

Neither offense could cross midfield throughout the majority of the fourth quarter, as Kanell was sacked twice by defensive tackle Henry Ford, and Michael Strahan and Robert Harris combined to stop a Tennessee drive. With just over two minutes remaining, Kanell hit Toomer for nine yards on 4th-and-2; but on the next play, his pass hung in the air and was picked off by Robertson. One first down run by George iced the game for the Oilers.

George rushed for 122 yards on 32 carries, as the Giants only gained 10 first downs and were 2-of-12 on third downs. It was the Oilers' first win against the Giants after losing all five meetings stationed in Houston. Coupled with a Washington win, the loss dropped New York into a 6–4 tie for first place in the division, while Chad Bratzke suffered a season-ending knee injury.

==== Week 12: vs. Arizona Cardinals ====
Week 12: Arizona Cardinals at New York Giants – Game summary

Quarter	1	2	3	4	Total
Cardinals	0	0	10	0	**10**
**Giants**	0	10	0	9	**19**

at Giants Stadium, East Rutherford, New Jersey

- Date: November 16
- Game time: 1:00 p.m. EST
- Game weather: Mix of sun and clouds, 38 °F (3 °C)
- Game attendance: 68,316
- Referee: Gary Lane
- TV announcers (Fox): Kenny Albert and Tim Green

Game information

**First quarter**

- No scoring plays.

**Second quarter**

- NYG – Brad Daluiso 33-yard field goal, 4:45. Giants 3–0. **Drive: 6 plays, 27 yards, 2:46.**
- NYG – Amani Toomer 56-yard pass from Danny Kanell (Brad Daluiso kick), 1:44. Giants 10–0. **Drive: 2 plays, 69 yards, 0:16.**

**Third quarter**

- ARI – Frank Sanders 70-yard pass from Jake Plummer (Joe Nedney kick), 13:52. Giants 10–7. **Drive: 3 plays, 66 yards, 1:08.**
- ARI – Joe Nedney 34-yard field goal, 2:05. Tied 10–10. **Drive: 11 plays, 63 yards, 4:49.**

**Fourth quarter**

- NYG – Howard Cross 1-yard pass from Danny Kanell (kick failed), 8:10. Giants 16–10. **Drive: 17 plays, 80 yards, 8:55.**
- NYG – Brad Daluiso 34-yard field goal, 4:49. Giants 19–10. **Drive: 4 plays, 3 yards, 0:51.**

**Top passers**

- ARI – Jake Plummer – 22/33, 388 yards, TD, 2 INT
- NYG – Danny Kanell – 14/21, 182 yards, 2 TD

**Top rushers**

- ARI – Larry Centers – 10 rushes, 34 yards
- NYG – Charles Way – 14 rushes, 114 yards

**Top receivers**

- ARI – Frank Sanders – 9 receptions, 188 yards, TD
- NYG – Amani Toomer – 2 receptions, 64 yards, TD

On a windy day, the Giants used a running game that produced over 200 yards and a defense that sacked rookie Jake Plummer eight times and forced three turnovers to secure a pivotal 19–10 win.

New York ran with Charles Way and Tyrone Wheatley to Arizona's 36-yard line on their first drive, but a holding call on center Lance Scott thwarted the series; Plummer hit passes to Frank Sanders and Rob Moore to cross midfield, but a sack by Scott Galyon on third down forced a punt. New York then used a combination of Way and Tiki Barber to run six straight plays for 65 yards to reach the Cardinals' 3. But Way and Wheatley failed to score on their next three plays, and the fourth-down sweep to Barber from the 1 was stopped for a loss.

Shortly after, a 4-yard gain by running back Ronald Moore resulted in center Mike Devlin cutting off Keith Hamilton at the knees; Hamilton responded by kicking him while he was getting up, and was ejected from the game. However, Arizona's drive ended when Leeland McElroy fumbled on a tackle by Jason Sehorn, who also recovered the ball; that led to a 33-yard Brad Daluiso field goal.

Plummer came back to hit Sanders over Tito Wooten for a 40-yard gain on 3rd-and-16, but three plays later, Sehorn and Michael Strahan combined for a sack to force a punt. With less than two minutes remaining in the first half, Danny Kanell called an audible at the line of scrimmage and launched a 56-yard touchdown pass to Amani Toomer; a last-minute sack by Jessie Armstead kept the Giants up 10–0 at halftime.

But on the third play of the third quarter, Plummer scrambled out and threw deep to Sanders, who got behind the defense and raced 70 yards for a touchdown, the longest play from scrimmage the Giants had given up all year. Later in the period, Way rumbled 42 yards, New York's longest run of the season; but the drive stalled, and Plummer completed three straight passes to Sanders, which led to a tying field goal by Joe Nedney.

As the game moved into the fourth, the Giants put together a season-long 17-play, 80-yard drive, with Kanell completing three passes to Barber and finding David Patten for a 26-yard gain against the pass rush. From the 1-yard line, Wheatley was stopped twice before Kanell faked to Barber and threw to Howard Cross for the go-ahead touchdown with just over eight minutes left; however, Daluiso missed the extra point, so the score remained 16–10.

On the ensuing drive, Plummer hit Rob Moore for 31 yards to cross midfield; but after a sack shared between Strahan and Robert Harris, Plummer's long 3rd-and-21 pass was intercepted by Sehorn, who returned it 41 yards to Arizona's 20. That led to a Daluiso field goal to extend New York's lead to 19–10, which held up thanks in part to sacks from Strahan and Armstead, and a last-minute pick by Wooten.

Way rushed for a career-high 114 yards on only 14 carries, while Strahan earned three sacks to give him 11 on the season, Armstead had 11 tackles, and Sehorn was named NFC Defensive Player of the Week. The win, coupled with a Washington loss to Dallas, put the 7-4 Giants a game ahead of both teams, setting up a crucial prime time game in Washington next week.

==== Week 13: at Washington Redskins ====
Week 13: New York Giants at Washington Redskins – Game summary

Quarter	1	2	3	4	OT	Total
Giants	0	0	7	0	0	**7**
Redskins	0	7	0	0	0	**7**

at Jack Kent Cooke Stadium, Landover, Maryland

- Date: November 23
- Game time: 8:00 p.m. EST
- Game weather: Partly cloudy, 49 °F (9 °C)
- Game attendance: 75,703
- Referee: Phil Luckett
- TV announcers (ESPN): Mike Patrick, Joe Theismann and Ron Jaworski

Game information

**First quarter**

- No scoring plays.

**Second quarter**

- WAS – Gus Frerotte 1-yard run (Scott Blanton kick), 2:16. Redskins 7–0. **Drive: 5 plays, 26 yards, 2:47.**

**Third quarter**

- NYG – Chris Calloway 4-yard pass from Danny Kanell (Brad Daluiso kick), 6:58. Tied 7–7. **Drive: 7 plays, 54 yards, 3:44.**

**Fourth quarter**

- No scoring plays.

**Overtime**

- No scoring plays.

**Top passers**

- NYG – Danny Kanell – 20/37, 168 yards, TD, INT
- WAS – Jeff Hostetler – 19/41, 213 yards, 3 INT

**Top rushers**

- NYG – Charles Way – 17 rushes, 84 yards
- WAS – Terry Allen – 27 rushes, 64 yards

**Top receivers**

- NYG – Tiki Barber – 7 receptions, 65 yards
- WAS – Michael Westbrook – 9 receptions, 125 yards

The Giants and Redskins met on Sunday Night Football for the former's only prime time game of the season, with first place in the NFC East on the line. In one of the more bizarre, unpredictable games of the year, the division rivals played to a 7–7 tie, keeping New York a game ahead of Washington in the standings.

The game was dominated by defense from the opening kickoff, as Tyrone Wheatley was stopped twice in 3rd-and-short situations in the first quarter, and despite Conrad Hamilton giving the Redskins two first downs via penalty on the same drive on 3rd-and-15, tackles for loss by Phillippi Sparks and Jessie Armstead knocked them out of field goal range.

After a Matt Turk punt pinned the Giants at their 1-yard line, Charles Way fumbled as he got out past the 5, but recovered; however, after back-to-back passes from Danny Kanell to Tiki Barber brought them out to the 34, Kanell was sacked on third down by linebacker Ken Harvey—his second sack of the night—and fumbled, with rookie defensive end Kenard Lang recovering. That led to quarterback Gus Frerotte scrambling for a 1-yard touchdown with 2:16 left in the first half. But in a weird twist, after scoring, Frerotte head-butted the padded concrete wall behind the end zone in exuberance, and suffered a jammed neck, which kept him out for the second half of the game.

Former Giant hero Jeff Hostetler entered in the third quarter, and was intercepted by Sparks off a deflection on his fourth pass just beyond midfield. New York gave the ball to Way four times for 31 yards; then a 20-yard pass interference penalty on cornerback Darrell Green led to Kanell finding Chris Calloway in the back of the end zone for a toe-tapping touchdown. Each team's next drive was spoiled by a sack, with Robert Harris and Keith Hamilton getting to Hostetler, and defensive end Jamal Duff—whom the Giants had cut before the season—nearly forcing a turnover before Greg Bishop recovered the fumble.

At the start of the fourth quarter, Terry Allen found running room for the only time, breaking loose for 29 yards. Hostetler then hit wide receiver Chris Thomas for 17 yards on 3rd-and-10; but Sparks knocked away his next third-down pass for Henry Ellard, and Scott Blanton's 45-yard field goal missed wide left.

Midway through the period, after Way dropped what would have been a first-down pass on 3rd-and-2, Hostetler completed a pair of passes to Michael Westbrook for 34 yards; but another sack by Hamilton killed the possession with 2:25 remaining.

After another exchange of punts, New York gained possession on their own 18 with 43 seconds to go. Kanell completed passes to Barber, Calloway and Erric Pegram, picking up 36 yards and putting them at Washington's 46 with one second left. After considering sending Brad Daluiso out for an NFL-record 64-yard field goal, Jim Fassel put the offense back on the field instead; Kanell's Hail Mary pass was disrupted by pressure and caught by Amani Toomer, who was tackled well short of the end zone.

On the first possession of overtime, Hostetler's third-down pass was intercepted by Jason Sehorn; however, another sack by Harvey—who had abused left tackle Roman Oben—forced a New York three-and-out. Passes to Ellard and tight end Jamie Asher put the Redskins at the Giants' 39; but on 3rd-and-2, Hostetler scrambled around and as he was being tackled by Michael Strahan, tried to pass the ball and fumbled it, with Harris recovering. But again the Giants went three-and-out, with Harvey picking up his fourth sack.

Hostetler passed Washington to the 50-yard line; a throw to Westbrook was stopped a yard short on 3rd-and-10, and the Giants' defensive line did not yield the distance to Allen on fourth down. Kanell finally hit passes to Toomer and Aaron Pierce; but they were stopped at the Redskins' 36, and Daluiso's 54-yard field goal hooked to the left. However, Hostetler was picked off again by Sparks on the next play, giving New York the ball back at the 49 with 3:12 remaining.

Wheatley ran for 14 yards on the first play of the drive, but the Giants were again stopped at the 36, so Daluiso came back on for another 54-yard try; it was blocked, but linebacker Marvcus Patton had called time-out before the snap, so the play was negated. Fassel then decided to send Brad Maynard to punt with 2:20 to go; it was Maynard's 13th punt in the game, the most by any player since John Teltschik had 15 in 1987.

From their 20, Hostetler completed passes to Ellard and Brian Mitchell, and then scrambled to the New York 38 with 48 seconds left. Hostetler's pass to Westbrook was caught out of bounds, and the incensed Westbrook took off his helmet in protest, drawing a 15-yard penalty and pushing the Redskins back to their own 47. Hostetler completed his next pass to Ellard at the 36, setting up fourth down with the clock running. Out of time-outs, Washington hurried the field goal team out for Blanton's own 54-yarder, which was wide right and short with two seconds left. Kanell's last-ditch heave was intercepted by Patton, ending the wild affair in a tie.

It was the Giants' first tie since they drew 20–20 with the St. Louis Cardinals on October 24, 1983, while Washington last tied 7–7 with the Philadelphia Eagles on November 7, 1971, before overtime was implemented in the regular season. Coincidentally enough, the Giants' next tie came against Washington, now rebranded the Commanders, in a 20-20 outcome on December 4, 2022.

==== Week 14: vs. Tampa Bay Buccaneers ====
Week 14: Tampa Bay Buccaneers at New York Giants – Game summary

Quarter	1	2	3	4	Total
**Buccaneers**	0	7	7	6	**20**
Giants	0	3	3	2	**8**

at Giants Stadium, East Rutherford, New Jersey

- Date: November 30
- Game time: 4:00 p.m. EST
- Game weather: Overcast, 45 °F (7 °C)
- Game attendance: 68,678
- Referee: Dale Hamer
- TV announcers (Fox): Dick Stockton, Matt Millen and Curt Menefee

Game information

**First quarter**

- No scoring plays.

**Second quarter**

- TB – Mike Alstott 1-yard pass from Trent Dilfer (Michael Husted kick), 7:54. Buccaneers 7–0. **Drive: 6 plays, 56 yards, 3:17.**
- NYG – Brad Daluiso 45-yard field goal, 0:04. Buccaneers 7–3. **Drive: 4 plays, 0 yards, 0:21.**

**Third quarter**

- TB – Mike Alstott 9-yard run (Michael Husted kick), 11:26. Buccaneers 14–3. **Drive: 6 plays, 84 yards, 3:34.**
- NYG – Brad Daluiso 30-yard field goal, 0:35. Buccaneers 14–6. **Drive: 6 plays, 77 yards, 2:18.**

**Fourth quarter**

- NYG – Intentional grounding penalty on Trent Dilfer enforced in end zone for a safety, 14:08. Buccaneers 14–8.
- TB – Errict Rhett 1-yard run (pass failed), 7:22. Buccaneers 20–8. **Drive: 8 plays, 52 yards, 4:40.**

**Top passers**

- TB – Trent Dilfer – 12/22, 152 yards, TD, 3 INT
- NYG – Danny Kanell – 14/31, 117 yards, 2 INT

**Top rushers**

- TB – Warrick Dunn – 24 rushes, 120 yards
- NYG – Tyrone Wheatley – 9 rushes, 64 yards

**Top receivers**

- TB – Dave Moore – 3 receptions, 55 yards
- NYG – Chris Calloway – 3 receptions, 56 yards

Against the Buccaneers, who had never won in seven games played at the Meadowlands, the Giants came out flat with just 202 yards from scrimmage and converting 1-of-13 third downs in a 20–8 loss.

The first drive looked promising, featuring a 27-yard pass from Danny Kanell to Chris Calloway on the initial play; but after drawing a penalty when failing to get Tampa Bay to jump offsides on 4th-and-2, Brad Daluiso missed a 47-yard field goal wide left. Later in the first quarter, quarterback Trent Dilfer hit tight end Dave Moore for a 26-yard gain into the New York red zone; but his third-down pass was intercepted by Phillippi Sparks, who returned it 68 yards to the Bucs' 27-yard line. However, Kanell was picked off by linebacker Derrick Brooks six plays later.

The turnover trend continued in the second quarter, as Dilfer was picked off again by Sparks and Kanell by cornerback Donnie Abraham in Tampa Bay territory. On 3rd-and-9, Dilfer hit rookie Warrick Dunn—inexplicably matched up with Michael Strahan—out of the backfield for a 53-yard catch-and-run; three plays later, Dilfer threw to Mike Alstott from the 1 for a touchdown.

After the Giants went three-and-out, the Buccaneers took over late in the first half, and used the running of Dunn and Alstott to drive into the red zone. But after a holding call on left guard Jim Pyne pushed them back out, Dilfer'a pass was deflected and intercepted by Tito Wooten, who got up and ran 53 yards to Tampa's 28; replays showed the ball hit the ground before Wooten got it, but it went unseen by the officials, and led to a Daluiso field goal just before halftime.

In the third quarter, Dilfer's deep pass for rookie wide receiver Reidel Anthony was intercepted by Jason Sehorn, but he was flagged for pass interference, putting the ball at the 9-yard line; Alstott rumbled for a touchdown on the next play, putting the Bucs up 14–3. Plays by Jessie Armstead and defensive end Chidi Ahanotu kept both offenses quiet until a 38-yard run by Tyrone Wheatley—coupled with back-to-back personal fouls on safety John Lynch—set up New York at the 10. But the drive stalled, so a short Daluiso field goal made the score 14–6 at the end of the period.

At the start of the fourth, Dilfer was blitzed by Conrad Hamilton in the end zone and was called for intentional grounding when he threw the ball out of bounds, giving the Giants two points via safety. But on 4th-and-1 from the Bucs' 47, Wheatley was stopped short; then on 3rd-and-18, Sparks was called for interference on a deep pass to wide receiver Robb Thomas. Dunn then carried three times for 27 yards down to the 1, where Errict Rhett hammered in for a touchdown; the Giants would not threaten again.

Dunn gained 169 yards from scrimmage—the most of his young career—as New York fell to 7–5–1; they maintained their one-game division lead thanks to a Redskins loss, but an Eagles win also bumped them up to 6–6–1, making next week's game in Philadelphia all the more critical.

==== Week 15: at Philadelphia Eagles ====
Week 15: New York Giants at Philadelphia Eagles – Game summary

Quarter	1	2	3	4	Total
**Giants**	7	14	0	10	**31**
Eagles	7	0	7	7	**21**

at Veterans Stadium, Philadelphia, Pennsylvania

- Date: December 7
- Game time: 1:00 p.m. EST
- Game weather: Mostly cloudy, 35 °F (2 °C)
- Game attendance: 67,084
- Referee: Gerry Austin
- TV announcers (Fox): Joe Buck and Bill Maas

Game information

**First quarter**

- NYG – Jessie Armstead 57-yard interception return. (Brad Daluiso kick), 12:19. Giants 7–0.
- PHI – Ricky Watters 1-yard run (Chris Boniol kick), 6:51. Tied 7–7. **Drive: 2 plays, 3 yards, 0:39.**

**Second quarter**

- NYG – Tiki Barber 11-yard pass from Danny Kanell (Brad Daluiso kick), 5:15. Giants 14–7. **Drive: 5 plays, 33 yards, 1:50.**
- NYG – David Patten 40-yard pass from Danny Kanell (Brad Daluiso kick), 4:17. Giants 21–7. **Drive: 1 play, 40 yards, 0:06.**

**Third quarter**

- PHI – Brian Dawkins 64-yard interception return. (Chris Boniol kick), 7:45. Giants 21–14.

**Fourth quarter**

- NYG – Chris Calloway 5-yard pass from Danny Kanell (Brad Daluiso kick), 10:39. Giants 28–14. **Drive: 9 plays, 70 yards, 4:09.**
- NYG – Brad Daluiso 19-yard field goal, 3:40. Giants 31–14. **Drive: 7 plays, 24 yards, 2:30.**
- PHI – Irving Fryar 72-yard pass from Bobby Hoying (Chris Boniol kick), 2:59. Giants 31–21. **Drive: 3 plays, 80 yards, 0:41.**

**Top passers**

- NYG – Danny Kanell – 14/27, 153 yards, 3 TD, INT
- PHI – Bobby Hoying – 16/35, 209 yards, TD, 3 INT

**Top rushers**

- NYG – Tiki Barber – 21 rushes, 114 yards
- PHI – Ricky Watters – 12 rushes, 39 yards, TD

**Top receivers**

- NYG – David Patten – 3 receptions, 54 yards, TD
- PHI – Irving Fryar – 2 receptions, 78 yards, TD

The Giants made the trip down I-95 to take on the Eagles, winners of two straight behind the play of new young quarterback Bobby Hoying, coming off a four-touchdown performance in a shootout win over the Bengals. But New York's defense forced five turnovers and collected four sacks, while Danny Kanell's career-high three touchdown passes paced a 31–21 win.

Jessie Armstead set the tone by intercepting Hoying's second pass and returning it 58 yards for a touchdown. However, Kanell matched him when the ball slipped out of his hand as he went back to pass, and cornerback Charles Dimry returned it to the 3-yard line; Ricky Watters scored two plays later.

Later in the first quarter, Tyrone Wheatley left the game with a sprained ankle, and Hoying completed passes to wide receiver Michael Timpson to reach the Giants' 29. On fourth down, he hit Irving Fryar for 13 yards; but left tackle Jermane Mayberry was flagged for illegal hands to the face, and the Eagles would punt. On their next possession, Hoying fumbled on a sack by Scott Galyon, and Keith Hamilton recovered. New York fed the ball to Tiki Barber on all five plays of their next possession, and he gained 33 yards, eventually scoring on an 11-yard pass from Kanell.

On the third play of Philadelphia's next drive, Hoying was sacked by defensive end Bernard Holsey—starting due to injuries to Chad Bratzke and Cedric Jones—and fumbled, with Michael Strahan recovering. One play later, Kanell threw a deep bomb to David Patten, who caught it in stride for a 40-yard touchdown. Both teams would miss field goals in the final minute of the first half, keeping the Giants up 21–7.

The Eagles drove to New York's 37 at the start of the third quarter, but running back Charlie Garner let Hoying's deep sideline pass go through his hands, and both Tito Wooten and Conrad Hamilton knocked away passes to kill the drive; however, Kanell's third-down pass for Chris Calloway was intercepted by Brian Dawkins, who took it 64 yards the other way for a touchdown.

New York traveled inside Philadelphia's 40 on their next two drives—with Armstead securing another interception—but they both ended in punts, as Kanell missed high for Amani Toomer and low for Barber. It was still 21-14 early in the fourth quarter before Barber broke down the left sideline for a 42-yard run down to the 5-yard line; two plays later, Kanell rolled out and hit Calloway in the corner of the end zone for a touchdown.

The Eagles' offense continued to sputter, as Hoying was picked off by Percy Ellsworth—the second time throwing off his back foot—and later a 19-yard punt set up the Giants with a short field. Runs by Barber and Charles Way led to a Brad Daluiso field goal to make the score 31–14. Hoying hooked up with Fryar for a late touchdown, but Way recovered the onside kick to seal the win.

Armstead, who also collected 10 tackles and half a sack, was named NFC Defensive Player of the Week, while Barber rushed for a season-high 114 yards and Way added 76 for the Giants, who moved one step closer to clinching the division title, with a rematch against Washington coming up.

==== Week 16: vs. Washington Redskins ====
Week 16: Washington Redskins at New York Giants – Game summary

Quarter	1	2	3	4	Total
Redskins	0	3	7	0	**10**
**Giants**	17	3	0	10	**30**

at Giants Stadium, East Rutherford, New Jersey

- Date: December 14
- Game time: 12:30 p.m. EST
- Game weather: Mix of sun and clouds, 36 °F (2 °C)
- Game attendance: 77,571
- Referee: Tom White
- TV announcers (Fox): Dick Stockton, Matt Millen and Pam Oliver

Game information

**First quarter**

- NYG – Brad Daluiso 41-yard field goal, 12:44. Giants 3–0. **Drive: 4 plays, 6 yards, 0:47.**
- NYG – Charles Way 15-yard run (Brad Daluiso kick), 10:03. Giants 10–0. **Drive: 2 plays, 16 yards, 0:35.**
- NYG – Chris Calloway 7-yard pass from Danny Kanell (Brad Daluiso kick), 1:14. Giants 17–0. **Drive: 13 plays, 76 yards, 7:42.**

**Second quarter**

- WAS – Scott Blanton 33-yard field goal, 10:11. Giants 17–3. **Drive: 12 plays, 55 yards, 6:03.**
- NYG – Brad Daluiso 28-yard field goal, 0:26. Giants 20–3. **Drive: 4 plays, 2 yards, 0:47.**

**Third quarter**

- WAS – Albert Connell 41-yard pass from Jeff Hostetler (Scott Blanton kick), 12:17. Giants 20–10. **Drive: 2 plays, 52 yards, 0:18.**

**Fourth quarter**

- NYG – Brad Daluiso 28-yard field goal, 14:24. Giants 23–10. **Drive: 10 plays, 40 yards, 5:05.**
- NYG – Jason Sehorn 35-yard interception return. (Brad Daluiso kick), 14:03. Giants 30–10.

**Top passers**

- WAS – Jeff Hostetler – 23/42, 288 yards, TD, 4 INT
- NYG – Danny Kanell – 13/25, 125 yards, TD, 2 INT

**Top rushers**

- WAS – Stephen Davis – 10 rushes, 41 yards
- NYG – Charles Way – 11 rushes, 49 yards, TD

**Top receivers**

- WAS – Albert Connell – 5 receptions, 89 yards, TD
- NYG – Howard Cross – 5 receptions, 52 yards

The Giants clinched their first NFC East title since 1990 with a 30-10 romp over the Redskins in front of a record crowd at Giants Stadium, with the defense forcing six turnovers on the afternoon.

The first came on a fumbled handoff between Jeff Hostetler and Stephen Davis, which Jessie Armstead recovered. After a Brad Daluiso field goal, Washington went three-and-out, but Matt Turk dropped the snap, setting up the Giants at the 16-yard line; two plays later, Charles Way barreled in for a touchdown. On New York's next drive, Danny Kanell led a 13-play, 76-yard drive by converting on third-down passes to Chris Calloway and Howard Cross. From the 7, he then hit Calloway on a slant for a score, putting New York up 17-0 still in the first quarter.

Hostetler passed the Redskins inside the Giants' 10 on their next drive, but a sack by Robert Harris forced a Scott Blanton field goal. The score was still 17–3 with less than two minutes remaining in the first half before Hostetler's pass for Brian Mitchell was intercepted by Conrad Hamilton off a deflection; that led to another Daluiso field goal, and Jason Sehorn intercepted Hostetler's Hail Mary pass in the end zone on the last play of the half.

The third quarter was a turnover-littered affair, as on Washington's first drive, Hostetler finally hit rookie wide receiver Albert Connell for a 41-yard touchdown; they then forced a punt due to a sack by Ken Harvey, but Connell was flagged for roughing the punter on Brad Maynard. However, Kanell was intercepted by safety Stanley Richard on the next play; but then Corey Widmer took a pass from Hostetler one play later. Maynard's next punt was muffed by Mitchell and recovered by David Patten, but Kanell was picked off again by Richard on the next play.

However, a pass deflection by Sehorn and a sack by Michael Strahan—his 14th on the year, tied for 3rd in the NFL and the most by a Giant since Lawrence Taylor had 15 in 1989—forced a three-and-out, and the Giants ran eight times on their next drive and got a tipped third-down catch by Amani Toomer, which ended with Daluiso's third field goal. The last four carries went to Rodney Hampton, a longtime veteran who had not played all season due to undergoing knee surgery.

On the second play of the Redskins' next drive, Michael Westbrook slipped and fell as Hostetler threw to him, and Sehorn intercepted it, taking it all the way for a touchdown to increase New York's lead to 30–10. In desperation, Hostetler completed a host of passes for chunk plays on Washington's next two drives; but fullback Larry Bowie was stuffed on 4th-and-1, and then Hostetler threw four straight incompletions at the Giants' 27. New York, meanwhile, used the running of Hampton and Way to burn off the remainder of the clock, securing a division title in front of the raucous home crowd.

Sehorn—who not only had two interceptions but also held Westbrook without a catch after having nine in their first meeting—was named NFC Defensive Player of the Week for the second time, as Jim Fassel became the Giants' first rookie head coach to win a division title since Allie Sherman in 1961.

==== Week 17: at Dallas Cowboys ====
Week 17: New York Giants at Dallas Cowboys – Game summary

Quarter	1	2	3	4	Total
**Giants**	10	10	0	0	**20**
Cowboys	0	0	7	0	**7**

at Texas Stadium, Irving, Texas

- Date: December 21
- Game time: 1:00 p.m. EST/12:00 p.m. CST
- Game weather: Cloudy, 48 °F (9 °C)
- Game attendance: 63,746
- Referee: Bernie Kukar
- TV announcers (Fox): Pat Summerall, John Madden and Mike Doocy

Game information

**First quarter**

- NYG – Brad Daluiso 28-yard field goal, 9:44. Giants 3–0. **Drive: 7 plays, 37 yards, 2:48.**
- NYG – Chris Calloway 21-yard pass from Danny Kanell (Brad Daluiso kick), 0:31. Giants 10–0. **Drive: 4 plays, 62 yards, 1:25.**

**Second quarter**

- NYG – Brad Daluiso 42-yard field goal, 7:59. Giants 13–0. **Drive: 9 plays, 50 yards, 4:12.**
- NYG – Rodney Hampton 1-yard run (Brad Daluiso kick), 1:19. Giants 20–0. **Drive: 10 plays, 65 yards, 4:48.**

**Third quarter**

- DAL – Emmitt Smith 4-yard run (Richie Cunningham kick), 13:57. Giants 20–7. **Drive: 3 plays, 20 yards, 0:55.**

**Fourth quarter**

- No scoring plays.

**Top passers**

- NYG – Danny Kanell – 8/16, 129 yards, TD
- DAL – Troy Aikman – 6/16, 73 yards, INT

**Top rushers**

- NYG – Tiki Barber – 17 rushes, 82 yards
- DAL – Emmitt Smith – 13 rushes, 40 yards, TD

**Top receivers**

- NYG – Chris Calloway – 3 receptions, 74 yards
- DAL – Anthony Miller – 5 receptions, 49 yards

With their playoff position already locked in, the Giants played their starters for one half and dominated the moribund Cowboys before letting most of their back-ups coast to a 20–7 win, becoming the first team in the NFC East to ever go undefeated in division play.

Dallas's first drive was a three-and-out that saw Troy Aikman get immediately sacked by Robert Harris—his 10th of the year—and three penalties. The Giants, meanwhile, had Danny Kanell hit David Patten on 3rd-and-11 for 33 yards, which eventually led to a 28-yard Brad Daluiso field goal. Later in the first quarter, he hit an open Chris Calloway for 41 yards, and then found him again for a 21-yard touchdown to give New York a 10–0 lead. It was Calloway's eighth of the season, the most by a Giants receiver since Mark Bavaro in 1987.

Another Daluiso field goal added to the Giants' lead, as throughout the first half, Aikman was frequently harassed by Keith Hamilton, and Michael Irvin by Jason Sehorn, who came up with his sixth interception—New York's league-best 27th—after a 26-yard pass to Anthony Miller gave the Cowboys their first substantial gain of the day, and an apparent huge throw down to the 1-yard line was wiped out by a penalty.

The Giants then traveled 65 yards in 10 plays, giving the ball to Rodney Hampton seven times and benefitting from a 35-yard pass interference call on Kevin Smith. With just over a minute left in the half, Hampton waltzed in from the one to make the score 20–0; his first touchdown of the season was the 49th of his career, breaking Joe Morris's franchise record.

The Cowboys had just two first downs in the first half, but in the third quarter, Dave Brown's first snap in over two months was fumbled and recovered by linebacker Fred Strickland; that led to an Emmitt Smith touchdown run three plays later. Brown continued to look uncomfortable, completing just 2-of-9 passes for 14 yards and taking three sacks; however, Dallas failed to capitalize, as Kevin Mathis had a big punt return negated by a penalty, and Aikman and his backup Wade Wilson both fumbled snaps on consecutive drives, giving the Giants a franchise-record 44 takeaways on the season.

In the fourth quarter, the running of Sherman Williams and a 45-yard punt return by Mathis put Dallas in the red zone on separate drives. But Richie Cunningham missed a field goal, while defensive tackle Ray Agnew sacked Jason Garrett on fourth down to kill their last scoring threat.

With the win, the Giants finished the regular season with a 10–5–1 record, while the Cowboys ended their tumultuous season with five straight losses, entering an offseason of change that included head coach Barry Switzer resigning. Elsewhere, wins by the Buccaneers, Lions and Vikings solidified the rest of the NFC playoff picture; Minnesota earned the No. 6 seed, and would be New York's opponents in the NFC Wild Card Game.

=== Standings ===
NFC East
	W	L	T	PCT	PF	PA	STK
^{(3)} New York Giants	10	5	1	.656	307	265	W3
Washington Redskins	8	7	1	.531	327	289	W1
Philadelphia Eagles	6	9	1	.406	317	372	L3
Dallas Cowboys	6	10	0	.375	304	314	L5
Arizona Cardinals	4	12	0	.250	283	379	W1

== Postseason ==
Round	Date	Opponent	Result	Record	Venue	Recap
Wild Card	December 27	Minnesota Vikings (6)	L 22–23	0–1	Giants Stadium	Recap

=== Game summary ===
==== NFC Wild Card Playoffs: vs. (6) Minnesota Vikings ====
NFC Wild Card Playoffs: (6) Minnesota Vikings at (3) New York Giants – Game summary

Quarter	1	2	3	4	Total
Vikings	0	3	7	13	23
Giants	3	16	0	3	22

at Giants Stadium, East Rutherford, New Jersey

- Date: December 27
- Game time: 12:30 p.m. EST
- Game weather: Snow and rain, 39 °F (4 °C)
- Game attendance: 77,497
- Referee: Ed Hochuli
- TV announcers (ABC): Mike Patrick, Joe Theismann, Ron Jaworski and Lesley Visser

Game information

First quarter

- NYG – Brad Daluiso 43-yard field goal, 6:35. Giants 3–0. Drive: 4 plays, −3 yards, 0:54.
- NYG – Brad Daluiso 22-yard field goal, 2:20. Giants 6–0. Drive: 7 plays, 42 yards, 3:57.

Second quarter

- NYG – Aaron Pierce 2-yard pass from Danny Kanell (Brad Daluiso kick), 11:33. Giants 13–0. Drive: 7 plays, 56 yards, 3:48.
- NYG – Brad Daluiso 41-yard field goal, 4:54. Giants 16–0. Drive: 6 plays, 23 yards, 1:39.
- MIN – Eddie Murray 26-yard field goal, 1:47. Giants 16–3. Drive: 5 plays, 19 yards, 1:24.
- NYG – Brad Daluiso 51-yard field goal, 0:13. Giants 19–3. Drive: 10 plays, 26 yards, 1:34.

Third quarter

- MIN – Leroy Hoard 4-yard run (Eddie Murray kick), 10:26. Giants 19–10. Drive: 1 play, 4 yards, 0:05.

Fourth quarter

- MIN – Eddie Murray 26-yard field goal, 14:45. Giants 19–13. Drive: 11 plays, 52 yards, 4:04.
- NYG – Brad Daluiso 22-yard field goal, 7:03. Giants 22–13. Drive: 13 plays, 74 yards, 7:42.
- MIN – Jake Reed 30-yard pass from Randall Cunningham (Eddie Murray kick), 1:30. Giants 22–20. Drive: 4 plays, 49 yards, 0:36.
- MIN – Eddie Murray 24-yard field goal, 0:10. Vikings 23–22. Drive: 7 plays, 56 yards, 1:20.

Top passers

- MIN – Randall Cunningham – 15/36, 203 yards, TD, INT
- NYG – Danny Kanell – 16/32, 199 yards, TD

Top rushers

- MIN – Robert Smith – 16 rushes, 40 yards
- NYG – Tiki Barber – 17 rushes, 29 yards

Top receivers

- MIN – Jake Reed – 5 receptions, 89 yards, TD
- NYG – David Patten – 5 receptions, 86 yards

The Giants hosted the Vikings—who had lost five of their last six games of the regular season after starting 8–2—in their first postseason game since 1993, and dominated the first half by taking a 19–3 halftime lead. But shockingly, their vaunted defense gave up 10 points in the last 90 seconds, sending them to a stunning 23–22 season-ending defeat.

New York reached Minnesota's 39-yard line on the opening drive before Tiki Barber was bounced outside for a six-yard loss and Danny Kanell was blitzed and sacked by defensive tackle Jason Fisk. But on the Vkings' second drive, Randall Cunningham—their former Eagle nemesis now filling in for the injured Brad Johnson—collided with fullback Chuck Evans and fumbled the ball, and Bernard Holsey recovered; it led to a 43-yard Brad Daluiso field goal, as Kanell threw just behind Barber on a third-down pass that would have scored.

After a 51-yard kickoff return by David Palmer, Cunningham fumbled again, this time on the snap, and Michael Strahan recovered. A 27-yard catch-and-run by Charles Way put the ball in the red zone, but the drive stalled, leading to another field goal. At the start of the second quarter, Kanell hit Barber for 11 yards on 3rd-and-4 and then found David Patten deep for a 39-yard gain down to the 2; Rodney Hampton failed to score twice before Kanell threw to Aaron Pierce for a touchdown.

Cunningham's terrible first half continued, as he was sacked by Keith Hamilton and then intercepted by Jason Sehorn on a deep throw to Cris Carter; Sehorn's 36-yard return led to Daluiso's third field goal to make the score 16–0. The Vikings responded with a three-and-out; but Mitch Berger's punt was fumbled by Amani Toomer on the return and recovered by Minnesota. A 19-yard catch by Carter put the ball at New York's 7, but the defense held them to a 26-yard Eddie Murray field goal.

From their own 40, the Giants took over with 1:47 remaining in the half; third-down conversions on a shovel pass to Barber and a run up the middle by Way set up Daluiso for a 46-yard field goal. But right guard Ron Stone was flagged for a false start; however, Daluiso's 51-yard kick glanced off the inside of the right upright and went through, putting New York up 19-3 going into halftime.

But on their first drive of the third quarter, Barber fumbled on a hit by rookie defensive tackle Tony Williams, and Jerry Ball recovered; running back Leroy Hoard scored from the 4 on the next play. Shortly after, Cunningham hit wide receiver Jake Reed for a 33-yard gain; but after a sack by Strahan, Murray's 48-yard field goal was wide left and short.

However, New York's 7th-ranked rushing attack was stymied, while the running of Cunningham and Robert Smith led to a 26-yard Murray field goal, making the score 19–13 at the start of the fourth. But Kanell responded by completing passes to Patten and Chris Calloway six times for 74 yards on the ensuing drive, converting on 3rd-and-9, 3rd-and-4, and 2nd-and-11 plays. But after taking nearly eight minutes off the clock, the drive stalled at the 5-yard line; the field goal snap was high, but Brad Maynard was able to corral and spot it, and Daluiso's kick was good for the fifth time, extending the Giants' lead to 22–13.

After the Vikings picked up a first down, Smith was stopped for a loss on 3rd-and-4, and they controversially chose to punt with less than four minutes remaining. But New York went three-and-out, and Maynard's punt only went 26 yards, giving Minnesota the ball at the Giants' 49 with 2:06 left. After a 19-yard pass to Carter, Cunningham threw long to Reed, who beat Tito Wooten and made the catch in the back of the end zone for a touchdown. Replays appeared to show Reed's left foot partly out of bounds, but it was called in, making the score 22–20 with 1:30 to go.

On Murray's ensuing onside kick, the ball skipped in and out of Calloway's grasp and was recovered in the mad scramble by Chris Walsh for the Vikings at the 39. After a false start and incompletion, Cunningham hit tight end Andrew Glover for 11 yards, and then Carter for 21 to the 35-yard line before spiking the ball to stop the clock with 50 seconds left.

Cunningham's next pass for Reed was incomplete, but Phillippi Sparks was flagged for pass interference, putting the ball at the 21; then Smith shot up the middle for 16 yards down to the 5, one of his only decent runs on the day. After Cunningham spiked the ball again, Murray's 24-yard field goal was good, putting Minnesota up 23–22 with 10 seconds remaining. Kanell's last-ditch heave was knocked down short of the goal line, ending the Giants' season that surpassed all expectations—with Jim Fassel earning Coach of the Year honors—in heartbreak.

It was the biggest comeback for a playoff road team since the Cowboys in 1972, while Vikings head coach Dennis Green earned his first postseason win after four losses in his first five seasons. The Giants, who averaged 124.3 rushing yards per game, had only 76 on 36 carries.

== See also ==
- List of New York Giants seasons
