= 1958 All-Skyline Conference football team =

American college football team

1958 All-Skyline Conference football team
| 1957 | 1958 | 1959 |

The 1958 All-Skyline Conference football team consists of American football players selected to the All-Skyline team selected for the 1958 college football season.

== Ends ==
- Don Black, New Mexico (AP-1; UPI-1)
- John Lands, Montana (AP-1; UPI-1)
- Jack Seul, Utah (UPI-2)
- R. K. Brown, BYU (UPI-2)

== Tackles ==
- Len Rohde, Utah State (AP-1; UPI-1)
- Pat O'Donnell, Colorado State (AP-1; UPI-2)
- Dale Memmelaar, Wyoming (UPI-1)
- John Kapele, BYU (UPI-2)
- Sal Cesario, Denver (UPI-2)

== Guards ==
- Stan Renning, Montana (AP-1; UPI-1)
- Leonard Kuczewski, Wyoming (AP-1; UPI-2)
- Lonnie Dennis, BYU (UPI-1)

== Center ==
- Don Miller, Denver (AP-1; UPI-1)
- Mike Connelly, Utah State (UPI-2)

== Quarterback ==
- Lee Grosscup, Utah (UPI-1)
- Fred Glick, Colorado State (UPI-2)

== Halfbacks ==
- Don Perkins, New Mexico (AP-1; UPI-1)
- Nyle McFarlane, BYU (AP-1; UPI-2)
- Bob Sawyer, Wyoming (UPI-1)
- Larry Wilson, Utah (UPI-2)

== Fullbacks ==
- Weldon Jackson, BYU (AP-1; UPI-1)
- Bo Bankston, New Mexico (UPI-2)

== Key ==
AP = Associated Press

UPI = United Press International

== See also ==
- 1958 College Football All-America Team
