= Harry Henderson =

Harry Henderson may refer to:

- Harry Henderson (actor), American actor
- Harry Henderson (cricketer) (1923–1997), English cricketer
- Harry Henderson (boxer) (1904–1976), American boxer
- Harry Henderson (footballer) (1880–1964), Australian rules footballer
- Harry Henderson (Neighbours), character on the Australian soap opera Neighbours

== See also ==
- Harry and the Hendersons, a 1987 American film
- Harold Henderson (disambiguation)
- Henry Henderson (disambiguation)
