= 1951 All-Skyline Conference football team =

American college football team

1951 All-Skyline Conference football team
1950	1951	1952

The 1951 All-Skyline Conference football team consists of American football players selected to the All-Skyline team selected by the Deseret News for the 1951 college football season.

== All Skyline selections ==
=== Ends ===
- Dewey McConnell, Wyoming
- Jim David, Colorado A&M
- Dick Buback, Utah

=== Tackles ===
- Harvey Achziger, Colorado A&M
- Jim Dublinski, Utah
- Lowell Madsen, BYU
- Fred Nanni, Denver

=== Guards ===
- Cal Chai, Denver
- Jim DeGuiseppi, Utah State
- Charles Kalani, Utah
- Tommy Hugo, Denver

=== Centers ===
- Wes Gardner, Utah
- Doug Reeves, Wyoming

=== Backs ===
- Gerry Collis, Denver
- Tom Dublinski, Utah
- Harry Geldien, Wyoming
- Paul Dinan, Utah State
- Tom Burr, BYU
- Ray Oliverson, BYU
- Chuck Hill, New Mexico
- LaVell Edwards, Utah State

== See also ==
- 1951 College Football All-America Team
