= 1955 All-Skyline Conference football team =

American college football team

1955 All-Skyline Conference football team
1954	1955	1956

The 1955 All-Skyline Conference football team consists of American football players selected to the All-Skyline team selected for the 1955 college football season.

== Ends ==
- Clarence Carter, Wyoming (AP-1)
- Larry Ross, Denver (AP-1)

== Tackles ==
- Ed Horvat, Denver (AP-1)
- Reed Henderson, Utah State (AP-1)

== Guards ==
- Dan Mirich, Colorado A&M (AP-1)
- Doug Dasinger, Montana (AP-1)
- Jay Weenig, BYU (AP-2)
- Jerry Nesbitt, New Mexico (AP-2)

== Center ==
- Bob Weber, Colorado A&M (AP-1)

== Quarterback ==
- Joe Mastrogiovanni, Wyoming (AP-1)
- Jimmy Bowen, Denver (AP-2)

== Halfbacks ==
- Gary Glick, Colorado A&M (AP-1)
- Herb Nakken, Utah (AP-1)
- Lou Mele, Utah (AP-1)

== Key ==
AP = Associated Press

== See also ==
- 1955 College Football All-America Team
