= 1959 All-Skyline Conference football team =

American college football team

1959 All-Skyline Conference football team
1958	1959	1960

The 1959 All-Skyline Conference football team consists of American football players selected to the All-Skyline team selected for the 1959 college football season.

== Ends ==
- Don Black, New Mexico (AP-1; UPI-1)
- John Lands, Montana (AP-1; UPI-1)
- Marty Hamilton, Wyoming (UPI-2)
- Duane Knox, Colorado State (UPI-2)

== Tackles ==
- Len Rohde, Utah State (AP-1; UPI-1)
- Ron Stehouwer, Colorado State (AP-1; UPI-1)
- John Kapele, BYU (UPI-2)
- Bob Coogan, Utah (UPI-2)

== Guards ==
- Leonard Kuczewski, Wyoming (AP-1; UPI-1)
- Lonnie Dennis, BYU (AP-1; UPI-1)
- Pat Smyth, Wyoming (UPI-2)
- John Garber, New Mexico (UPI-2)

== Center ==
- Jim Eifrid, Colorado State (AP-1; UPI-1)
- Mike Connelly, Utah State (UPI-2)

== Quarterback ==
- Jim Walden, Wyoming (AP-1; UPI-1)
- Ken Vierra, Utah (UPI-2)

== Halfbacks ==
- Larry Wilson, Utah (AP-1; UPI-1)
- Jerry Hill, Wyoming (AP-1; UPI-1)
- Wayne Schneider, Colorado State (UPI-2)
- Bill Brown, New Mexico (UPI-2)

== Fullbacks ==
- Don Perkins, New Mexico (AP-1; UPI-1)
- Monk Bailey, Utah (UPI-2)

== Key ==
AP = Associated Press

UPI = United Press International

== See also ==
- 1959 College Football All-America Team
