= 1953 All-Skyline Conference football team =

American college football team

1954 All-Skyline Conference football team
1952	1953	1954

The 1953 All-Skyline Conference football team consists of American football players selected to the All-Skyline team selected for the 1953 college football season.

== Ends ==
- Dick Buback, Utah (AP-1; DN-1)
- Marion Probert, BYU (AP-1; DN-2)
- Dewey Brundage, BYU (DN-1)
- George Hotchkin, Utah State (DN-2)

== Tackles ==
- Wimp Hewgley, Wyoming (AP-1; DN-1)
- Martin Hicks, Denver (AP-1)
- Don Jensen, Utah (DN-1)
- Dave Kragthorpe, Utah State (DN-2)
- Kay Dalton, Colorado A&M (DN-2)

== Guards ==
- Dale Haupt, Wyoming (AP-1; DN-1)
- Jim Durrant, Utah (AP-1; DN-2)
- LaMont Lamb, Utah State (DN-1)
- Jay Crampton, New Mexico (DN-2)

== Center ==
- Larry White, New Mexico (AP-1; DN-1)
- Charles Grant, Utah (DN-2)

== Quarterback ==
- Don Rydalch, Utah (AP-1; DN-1)
- Dick Heath, Montana (DN-2)

== Backs ==
- Joe Mastrogiovanni, Wyoming (AP-1; DN-1)
- Don Peterson, Utah (AP-1; DN-1)
- Dick Imer, Montana (AP-1; DN-2)
- Earl Lindley, Utah State (DN-1)
- Jack Cross, Utah (DN-2)
- George Galuska, Wyoming (DN-2)

== Key ==
AP = Associated Press

DN = Deseret News.

== See also ==
- 1953 College Football All-America Team
