= Henry Henderson =

Henry Henderson may refer to:

- Henry M. Henderson, mayor of Flint, Michigan 1857–1858
- Henry Henderson (baseball) (1905–1980), American baseball player
- Henry Henderson (missionary) (1843–1891), Scottish lay Christian founder of Blantyre Mission, Malawi
  - Henry Henderson Institute, Blantyre, Malawi, named after the missionary
- Henry Henderson of Henderson's Relish
- Henry Henderson (American football) from List of Utah State Aggies in the NFL draft

== See also ==
- Harry Henderson (disambiguation)
