= 1956 All-Skyline Conference football team =

American college football team

1956 All-Skyline Conference football team
1955	1956	1957

The 1956 All-Skyline Conference football team consists of American football players selected to the All-Skyline team selected for the 1956 college football season.

== Ends ==
- Buster Elder, Wyoming (AP-1; DN-1)
- Ernie Pitts, Denver (AP-1; DN-2)
- Jerry Liston, Utah (DN-1)
- Terry Hurley, Montana (DN-2)

== Tackles ==
- Larry Amizich, Utah (AP-1; DN-1)
- Tom Ramage, Utah State (AP-1)
- John Higgins, Wyoming (DN-1)
- Larry Sorenson, Utah State (DN-2)
- Ed Stuart, Denver (DN-2)

== Guards ==
- Jay Weening, BYU (AP-1; DN-1)
- Chet Franklin, Utah (AP-1; DN-2)
- Jerry Nesbitt, New Mexico (DN-1)
- Stan Renning, Montana (DN-2)

== Center ==
- Bob Weber, Colorado A&M (AP-1; DN-1)
- Vince Guinta, Wyoming (AP-2; DN-2)

== Quarterback ==
- Larry Zowada, Wyoming (AP-1; DN-2)
- Bob Winters, Utah State (DN-1)

== Halfbacks ==
- Jim Crawford, Wyoming (AP-1; DN-1)
- Jack Hill, Utah State (AP-1; DN-1)
- John Watts, Wyoming (AP-1; DN-2)
- Stuart Vaughan, Utah (DN-2)

== Fullbacks ==
- Merrill Douglas, Utah (DN-1)
- Phil Spear, New Mexico (DN-2)

== Key ==
AP = Associated Press

DN = Deseret News

== See also ==
- 1956 College Football All-America Team
