= 1950 All-Skyline Conference football team =

American college football team

1950 All-Skyline Conference football team
1949	1950	1951

The 1950 All-Skyline Conference football team consists of American football players selected to the All-Skyline team selected by the Deseret News for the 1950 college football season.

== All Skyline selections ==
=== Ends ===
- Gordon Cooper, Denver
- Mike Peterson, Denver
- Don Peterson, Utah
- C. T. Hewgley, Wyoming

=== Tackles ===
- Gene Beauchamp, Denver
- Frank McKibben, Colorado A&M
- Jim Martin, Wyoming
- Jerry Taylor, Wyoming

=== Guards ===
- Dale Dodrill, Colorado A&M
- Dan Holt, Denver
- Tom Drost, Wyoming

=== Centers ===
- Doug Reeves, Wyoming
- LaVell Edwards, Utah State

=== Quarterbacks ===
- Dave Cunningham, Utah
- Jack Christiansen, Colorado A&M

=== Halfbacks ===
- George Bean, Utah
- Rex Berry, BYU
- Frank Faucett, Colorado A&M
- Dick Campbell, Wyoming

=== Fullbacks ===
- Eddie Talboom, Wyoming
- Dick Hill, BYU

== See also ==
- 1950 College Football All-America Team
