= Harold Henderson =

Harold Henderson may refer to:

- Harold Henderson (British politician) (1875–1922), British Conservative politician
- Harold Gould Henderson, American Japanologist
- Harold Lloyd Henderson, Canadian Presbyterian minister and politician
- Harold Paulk Henderson, American political scientist
- Harold Henderson (ice hockey) in 1897 AHAC season
- Harold Henderson, the author of Let's Kill Dick and Jane, a book critical of the Dick and Jane book series

== See also ==
- Harold R. Henderson Pavilion
- Harry Henderson (disambiguation)
