= 1952 All-Skyline Conference football team =

American college football team

1952 All-Skyline Conference football team
1951	1952	1953

The 1952 All-Skyline Conference football team consists of American football players selected to the All-Skyline team selected by the Deseret News for the 1952 college football season.

== Offensive selections ==
=== Ends ===
- George Hotchkin, Utah State
- Dick Buback, Utah

=== Tackles ===
- Lowell Madsen, BYU
- Bob Antonick, Montana

=== Guards ===
- Bob Blasi, Colorado A&M
- Jack Barger, New Mexico

=== Center ===
- Tommy Hugo, Denver

=== Quarterback ===
- Don Rydalch, Utah

=== Halfbacks ===
- Bill Kaiser, New Mexico
- Chuck Spaulding, Wyoming

=== Fullback ===
- George Bean, Utah

=== Placekicker ===
- Mike Prokopiak, New Mexico

== Defensive selections ==
=== Ends ===
- Orville Nellestein, Utah
- Joe Cippola, Utah State

=== Tackles ===
- Dale Gardner, Utah State
- Jim Dublinski, Utah

=== Guards ===
- Don Papini, New Mexico
- Charles Kalani, Utah

=== Linebackers ===
- Bill Hileman, Wyoming
- Jae R. Ballif, BYU

=== Halfbacks ===
- Joe Mahorcich, Colorado A&M
- Gary Paxman, BYU

=== Safety ===
- Bud Paul, Utah State

== See also ==
- 1952 College Football All-America Team
