= Thomas Randolph (American football) =

American football player (born 1970)

No. 23, 20, 27
- Position: Cornerback

Personal information
- Born: October 5, 1970 (age 56); Norfolk, Virginia, U.S.
- Listed height: 5 ft 9 in (1.75 m)
- Listed weight: 185 lb (84 kg)

Career information
- High school: Manhattan (Manhattan, Kansas)
- College: Kansas State
- NFL draft: 1994: 2nd round, 47th overall pick

Career history
- New York Giants (1994–1997); Cincinnati Bengals (1998); Indianapolis Colts (1999)

Awards and highlights
- Second-team All-American (1993); First-team All-Big Eight (1993)

Career NFL statistics
- Tackles: 202
- Interceptions: 6
- INT yards: 16
- Stats at Pro Football Reference

Thomas Carl Randolph II (born October 5, 1970) is an American former professional football player who was a cornerback in the National Football League (NFL).

Randolph attended Manhattan High School in Manhattan, Kansas. He played college football for the Kansas State Wildcats, where he was named to the Associated Press second-team All-American team in 1993. Randolph was also an All-American for the Kansas State Wildcats track and field team, placing 3rd in the 55 meters at the 1993 NCAA Division I Indoor Track and Field Championships.

Randolph was selected by the New York Giants in the second round of the 1994 NFL draft. He played with the Giants from 1994 to 1997. He subsequently played for the Cincinnati Bengals in 1998 and the Indianapolis Colts in 1999, which was his final year in the NFL.

== NFL career statistics ==
Legend
**Bold**	Career high

Year	Team	Games		Tackles				Interceptions				Fumbles			
Year	Team	GP	GS	Comb	Solo	Ast	Sck	Int	Yds	TD	Lng	FF	FR	Yds	TD
1994	NYG	16	10	39	32	**7**	0.0	1	0	0	0	0	0	0	0
1995	NYG	16	16	**58**	**52**	6	0.0	**2**	**15**	0	**15**	0	**1**	0	0
1996	NYG	16	2	37	31	6	0.0	0	0	0	0	0	**1**	**17**	0
1997	NYG	16	4	33	32	1	0.0	1	1	0	1	**1**	0	0	0
1998	CIN	16	1	20	19	1	0.0	1	0	0	0	0	0	0	0
1999	IND	15	0	15	15	0	0.0	1	0	0	0	0	**1**	0	0
		95	33	202	181	21	0.0	6	16	0	15	1	3	17	0
