= Kevin Alexander (wide receiver) =

American football player (born 1975)

No. 86, 88, 87
- Position: Wide receiver

Personal information
- Born: January 23, 1975 (age 51); Baton Rouge, Louisiana, U.S.
- Listed height: 5 ft 9 in (1.75 m)
- Listed weight: 185 lb (84 kg)

Career information
- High school: Valencia (Placentia, California)
- College: Utah State
- NFL draft: 1996: undrafted

Career history
- New York Giants (1996–1997); Miami Dolphins (1998)*; Washington Redskins (1998–1999)*; Montreal Alouettes (2000–2001); Ottawa Renegades (2002)
- * Offseason or practice squad member only

Career NFL statistics
- Receptions: 22
- Receiving yards: 364
- Receiving touchdowns: 1
- Stats at Pro Football Reference

Kevin John Alexander (born January 23, 1975) is an American former professional football player who was a wide receiver several teams in the National Football League (NFL) and the Canadian Football League (CFL). He played college football at Glendale Community College and Utah State before playing for two seasons with the New York Giants from 1996 to 1997. Alexander also played for the Miami Dolphins and Washington Redskins of the NFL and the Montreal Alouettes and Ottawa Renegades of the CFL.

== Professional career ==
Alexander was signed by the New York Giants as an undrafted free agent following the 1996 NFL draft. He was waived during final cuts on August 20, 1996, but was immediately re-signed to the team's practice squad. He was promoted to the active roster on October 26, 1996 to replace Amani Toomer. He was re-signed on January 9, 1997. Alexander made the active roster that season after catching a 42-yard touchdown in a preseason game. He later made his NFL debut in place of the injured Thomas Lewis. After Alexander was injured himself, David Patten replaced him as a starting wide receiver.

Alexander was signed to a two-year contract by the Miami Dolphins on March 2, 1998. He was released by the Dolphins on August 25, 1998. Alexander was signed by the Washington Redskins on February 23, 1999 and was released on August 31, 1999.

After Alexander left the NFL, he joined the Montreal Alouettes of the Canadian Football League. He made his CFL debut in 2000, playing in nine games and scored three touchdowns with 272 receiving yards. In 2001, he scored another three touchdowns and had 26 catches for 343 yards. Alexander played six games for the Ottawa Renegades during the 2002 season.
