= David Patten =

American football player and coach (1974–2021)

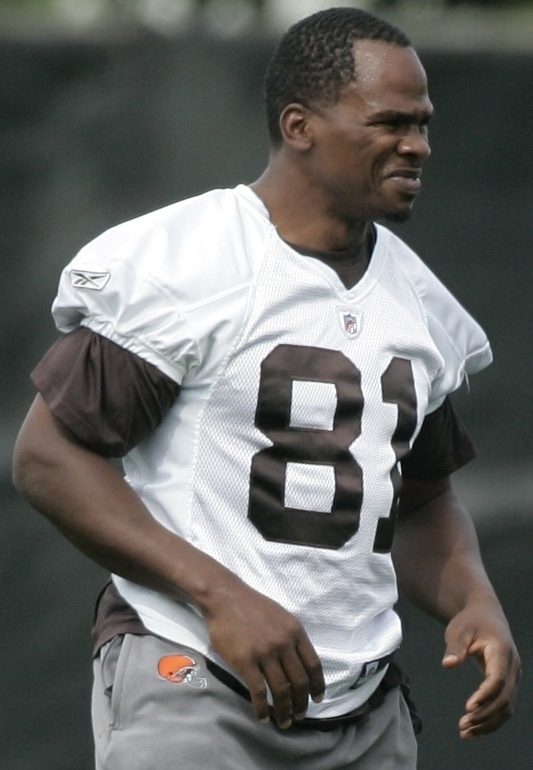
- Patten with the Cleveland Browns in 2009

No. 83, 85, 82, 86, 80, 81
- Position: Wide receiver

Personal information
- Born: August 19, 1974; Hopkins, South Carolina, U.S.
- Died: September 2, 2021 (aged 47); Columbia, South Carolina, U.S.
- Listed height: 5 ft 10 in (1.78 m)
- Listed weight: 192 lb (87 kg)

Career information
- High school: Lower Richland (Hopkins)
- College: Western Carolina
- NFL draft: 1996: undrafted

Career history

Playing
- Albany Firebirds (1996); New York Giants (1997–1999); Cleveland Browns (2000); New England Patriots (2001–2004); Washington Redskins (2005–2006); New Orleans Saints (2007–2008); Cleveland Browns (2009)*; New England Patriots (2010)*
- * Offseason or practice squad member only

Coaching
- Western Carolina (2013–2021) (asst coach)

Awards and highlights
- 3× Super Bowl champion (XXXVI, XXXVIII, XXXIX)

Career NFL statistics
- Receptions: 324
- Receiving yards: 4,715
- Receiving touchdowns: 24
- Stats at Pro Football Reference
- Stats at ArenaFan.com

David Patten (August 19, 1974 – September 2, 2021) was an American professional football player who was a wide receiver in the National Football League (NFL). He is best known for catching a touchdown pass late in the second quarter of Super Bowl XXXVI from quarterback Tom Brady as a member of the New England Patriots.

Patten was signed by the Albany Firebirds of the Arena Football League (AFL) as a street free agent in 1996. Starting in 1997, he played in the NFL and competed for 12 seasons through 2008. He played college football for the Western Carolina Catamounts.

Patten was also a member of the New York Giants, Washington Redskins, New Orleans Saints, Cleveland Browns and New England Patriots. He won three Super Bowls with the Patriots.

== Early life ==
Patten played football at Lower Richland High School in Hopkins, South Carolina, where he caught passes from future Major League Baseball player Pokey Reese.

== College career ==
After graduating from high school, Patten attended Western Carolina University. As a junior in 1994, he averaged 3.6 catches, good for sixth in the Southern Conference. In 1995, his senior season, Patten recorded 59 catches for 881 yards and was named to the All-Southern Conference team.

== Professional career ==
=== Albany Firebirds ===
Patten went undrafted in the 1996 NFL draft but began his professional football career by playing for the Arena Football League's Albany Firebirds in the summer of 1996. He signed late in the AFL's season and played in their final regular season game on August 2, 1996, in a 54–49 win over the Milwaukee Mustangs. Patten caught two passes for 37 yards in the game.

=== New York Giants ===
After spending the rest of the 1996 season out of football, Patten was signed by the New York Giants on March 24, 1997. He was waived by the Giants on August 24, 1997, and re-signed to their practice squad the next day. Two days later, the Giants signed Patten to their 53-man roster. He played in 16 games for the Giants in 1997, catching 13 passes for 226 yards and returning eight kickoffs for 123 yards. In 1998, Patten played in 12 games for the Giants, returning 43 kickoffs for 928 yards and one touchdown, while also catching 11 passes for 119 yards and a touchdown. In 1999, his final season with the Giants, Patten played in 16 games, leading the team with 33 kickoff returns for 673 yards as well as recording nine receptions for 115 yards.

=== First stint with Browns ===
Following the 1999 season, Patten signed as an unrestricted free agent with the Cleveland Browns. He spent one season with the team, starting 10 of 14 games and recording 38 receptions for 546 yards.

=== New England Patriots ===
In 2001, Patten signed as a free agent with the New England Patriots. He started 14 games at wide receiver for the Patriots in 2001, setting a then-career-high with 51 catches for 749 yards. Against the Indianapolis Colts on October 21, 2001, Patten became the eighth player in NFL history (and just the second since the merger) to run, catch, and throw for a touchdown in a 38–17 win; he was named AFC Offensive Player of the Week for his performance. He scored on a 29-yard end around on the Patriots' first offensive play. In the second quarter, he caught a 91-yard touchdown pass from Tom Brady. and then caught a lateral from Brady before throwing a 60-yard pass to Troy Brown. It was the first such game since Walter Payton did it in 1979.

Patten caught a touchdown pass from Drew Bledsoe in the AFC Championship Game at Pittsburgh and then caught a score from Tom Brady in the Patriots' Super Bowl XXXVI win over the St. Louis Rams in February 2002, earning his first Super Bowl ring.

In 2002, Patten again started 14 of 16 games, setting a career-high with 61 receptions, 824 yards, and five touchdowns while leading Patriots receivers with 13.5 yards per catch. Patten started five of the team's first six games in 2003 before being placed on injured reserve on November 7. Patten returned to start 11 of 16 games in 2004, recording 44 catches for 800 yards and seven touchdowns and earning his third Super Bowl ring in a win over the Philadelphia Eagles in Super Bowl XXXIX.

=== Washington Redskins ===
Following the 2004 season, Patten signed a five-year, $13 million contract with the Washington Redskins. Patten started seven of the first nine games of the season with the Redskins before being placed on injured reserve on November 18. He finished the season with 22 receptions for 217 yards. In 2006, Patten played in the first four games of the season, recording one reception for 25 yards, his only catch of the season. He was inactive for the remainder of the season except Week 17. He was released by the Redskins on March 22, 2007.

=== New Orleans Saints ===
A few weeks after his release from Washington, Patten signed a one-year deal with the New Orleans Saints. He went on to have the second-best season of his career statistically, catching 54 passes for 792 yards and three touchdowns. Patten started three of the first four games for the Saints in 2008, but played in only one game after that due to injuries. He finished the season with 11 catches for 162 yards and one touchdown and was released by the Saints following the season.

=== Second stint with Browns ===
Patten signed with the Cleveland Browns for the second time on March 23, 2009, as a free-agent. He was released on September 5, 2009.

=== Return to New England and retirement ===
On February 24, 2010, Patten was signed by the Patriots.

On July 31, 2010, Patten announced his retirement. When asked why he was retiring he responded, "I just felt like it was time. It just hit me yesterday. Camp was going really well. I was still able to go out and be competitive and operate at a high level, but I believe once you get to the point in your career where it's multiple years—it would be my 13th year—and you're thinking about it mentally and you're not 100 percent into it mentally wise, it's tough to play this game. I always felt like when I got to that that point, it would be in my best interests to walk away."

== NFL career statistics ==
Legend
	Won the Super Bowl
**Bold**	Career high

=== Regular season ===
Year	Team	Games		Receiving				
Year	Team	GP	GS	Rec	Yds	Avg	Lng	TD
1997	NYG	16	3	13	226	17.4	40	2
1998	NYG	12	0	11	119	10.8	39	1
1999	NYG	16	0	9	115	12.8	19	0
2000	CLE	14	11	38	546	14.4	65	1
2001	NE	16	14	51	749	14.7	**91**	4
2002	NE	16	14	**61**	**824**	13.5	39	5
2003	NE	6	5	9	140	15.6	42	0
2004	NE	16	11	44	800	18.2	48	**7**
2005	WAS	9	7	22	217	9.9	32	0
2006	WAS	5	0	1	25	**25.0**	25	0
2007	NOR	16	5	54	792	14.7	58	3
2008	NOR	5	3	11	162	14.7	39	1
		147	73	324	4,715	14.6	91	24

=== Playoffs ===
Year	Team	Games		Receiving				
Year	Team	GP	GS	Rec	Yds	Avg	Lng	TD
1997	NYG	1	1	5	86	**17.2**	**37**	0
2001	NE	3	3	**13**	**154**	11.8	25	**2**
2004	NE	3	0	2	20	10.0	12	0
		7	4	20	260	13.0	37	2

== Personal life ==
Patten had returned to Western Carolina University to complete his degree in social work and, at the time of his death in 2021, he was entering his ninth season as an assistant coach for the Catamounts.

On September 2, 2021, Patten died in a three-vehicle accident in Columbia, South Carolina, aged 47. While riding his motorcycle, he traveled left off the center line and collided with a sedan, which later collided with another vehicle.
