= Joe DeLuca =

American gridiron football player and coach (1932–2013)

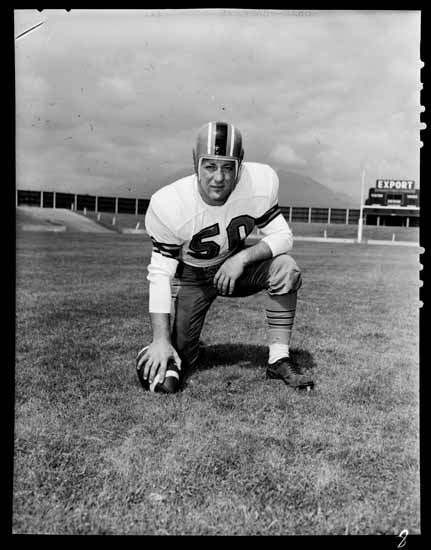
- DeLuca in 1955

Profile
- Position: Guard

Personal information
- Born: June 6, 1932; Weed, California, U.S.
- Died: July 21, 2013 (aged 81); Pleasant Hill, California, U.S.
- Listed height: 5 ft 10 in (1.78 m)
- Listed weight: 215 lb (98 kg)

Career information
- College: Montana

Career history
- 1955: BC Lions

Joseph Frank DeLuca (June 6, 1932 – July 21, 2013) was an American gridiron football player and coach. He played professionally for the BC Lions in 1955. DeLuca played college football at the University of Montana. He served as the head football coach at Saint Mary's College of California from 1984 to 1985, compiling a record of 8–14.

DeLuca was born in Weed, California, where he attended high school and competed in football, basketball, baseball, and track. He attended Olympic Junior College—now known as Olympic College—in Bremerton, Washington and was an all-conference football player at guard and linebacker. DeLuca transferred Montana, where he was an All-Skyline Conference selection in 1953 and 1954. DeLucas began his coaching career at Trinity High School in Weaverville, California. From 1962 to 1964 was the line coach at Fullerton Junior College—now known as Fullerton College. He earned a master's degree from Chico State College—now known as California State University, Chico.

== Head coaching record ==
=== College ===
Year	Team	Overall	Conference	Standing	Bowl/playoffs
Saint Mary's Gaels (NCAA Division II independent) (1984–1985)
1984	Saint Mary's	5–6			
1985	Saint Mary's	3–8			
Saint Mary's:		8–14			
Total:		8–14			
