= Harry Henderson (footballer) =

Australian rules footballer

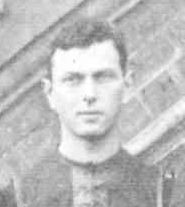

Personal information
- Full name: Harry Claude Henderson
- Born: 2 July 1880; Richmond, Victoria
- Died: 21 August 1964 (aged 84); Fitzroy, Victoria
- Height: 180 cm (5 ft 11 in)
- Position: Fullback

Playing career^{1}
Years	Club	Games (Goals)
1903–06	Melbourne	57 (2)
- ^{1} Playing statistics correct to the end of 1906.

Harry Claude Henderson (2 July 1880 – 21 August 1964) was an Australian rules footballer who played with Melbourne in the Victorian Football League (VFL).
