= Harry Henderson (cricketer) =

English cricketer

Harry Henderson (23 September 1923 – July 1997) was an English cricketer. He was a right-handed batsman and wicket-keeper who played for Northumberland. He was born in Northumberland and died in Newcastle upon Tyne.

Henderson, whose Minor Counties career for Northumberland stretched back 24 seasons, made his sole List A appearance at the age of 48, in 1971. He did not bat or bowl during the match, though he took one catch from behind the stumps.

Henderson continued to represent Northumberland until the end of the 1971 season.
