= Robert Harris (American football) =

American football player (born 1969)

No. 90, 97
- Positions: Defensive tackle, defensive end

Personal information
- Born: June 13, 1969 (age 57); Riviera Beach, Florida, U.S.
- Listed height: 6 ft 4 in (1.93 m)
- Listed weight: 295 lb (134 kg)

Career information
- High school: Suncoast (Riviera Beach)
- College: Southern
- NFL draft: 1992: 2nd round, 39th overall pick

Career history
- Minnesota Vikings (1992–1994); New York Giants (1995–1999)

Career NFL statistics
- Tackles: 219
- Sacks: 27
- Fumble recoveries: 4
- Stats at Pro Football Reference

Robert Harris (born June 13, 1969) is an American former professional football player who was a defensive end and defensive tackle in the National Football League (NFL). He played college football for the Southern Jaguars and was selected 39th overall by the Minnesota Vikings in the second round of the 1992 NFL draft. After a stint with the Vikings, he played for the New York Giants.
