= Weldon Jackson =

American football player (born c. 1937)

Profile
- Position: Fullback

Personal information
- Born: July 20, 1937; Mesa, Arizona, U.S.
- Died: February 16, 2026 (aged 88); St. George, Utah
- Listed height: 5 ft 11 in (1.80 m)
- Listed weight: 173 lb (78 kg)

Career information
- High school: Mesa High School
- College: BYU (1956–1958)

Weldon Francis Jackson (born July 20, 1937) was an American football fullback for the BYU Cougars from 1956 to 1958. As a senior in 1958, he set a BYU record with a 93-yard touchdown run against Fresno State. For the full 1958 season, he led the Skyline Conference, and ranked seventh nationally, with 698 rushing yards. He also ranked second nationally with an average of 6.9 yards per carry. He also tallied 605 rushing yards in 1957 and 146 yards in 1956. He ended his collegiate career as BYU's career rushing leader with 1,449 yards, a record that was broken in 1962 by Eldon Fortie. He also competed for BYU's track team, winning a conference championship in the broad jump.

== College statistics ==
Season	School	Games	Att	Yds	Avg	Rec	Rec Yds	TD
1956	BYU	10	53	146	2.8	7	43	0
1957	BYU	10	138	605	4.4	4	9	3
1958	BYU	10	101	698	6.9	3	29	6
Career	BYU	30	292	1449	5.0	14	81	9
