= Gerry Collis =

American football and baseball player coach (1930–2024)

Biographical details
- Born: June 3, 1930; McGill, Nevada, U.S.
- Died: January 24, 2024 (aged 93)

Playing career

Football
- 1949–1951: Denver

Baseball
- 1951–1952: Denver
- 1952: Denver Bears
- 1952: Hutchinson Elks
- 1952: Billings Mustangs
- 1956: Winston-Salem Twins
- Positions: Quarterback (football); Outfielder, second baseman, third baseman (baseball)

Coaching career (HC unless noted)

Football
- 1957–1966: Bakersfield (backfield)
- 1967–1983: Bakersfield

Baseball
- 1958–1967: Bakersfield

Head coaching record
- Overall: 121–49–2 (junior college football)
- Tournaments: Football; 1–3 ( California JC large division playoffs)

Accomplishments and honors

Championships
- Football; 1 junior college national (1976); 5 Metropolitan Conference (1967, 1969–1970, 1976, 1981)

Gerry Demos Collis (June 3, 1930 – January 24, 2024), sometimes spelled Jerry Collis, was an American football and baseball player and coach. He served as the head football coach at Bakersfield College in Bakersfield, California from 1967 to 1983, compiling a record of 121–49–2. He led his 1976 Bakersfield team to a victory in the Junior Rose Bowl and a junior college national championship. Collis was also the head baseball coach at Bakersfield from 1958 to 1967.

Collis served as backfield coach for the football team at Bakersfield from 1957 to 1966, before succeeding Ray Newman as head football coach in 1967.

Collis was born on June 3, 1930, in McGill, Nevada. He died on January 24, 2024.

== Head coaching record ==
=== Junior college football ===
Year	Team	Overall	Conference	Standing	Bowl/playoffs
Bakersfield Renegades (Metropolitan Conference) (1967–1983)
1967	Bakersfield	9–1	7–0	1st	L California JC large division semifinal
1968	Bakersfield	8–1	6–1	2nd	
1969	Bakersfield	10–1	6–0	1st	L California JC large division semifinal
1970	Bakersfield	9–1	6–0	1st	L California JC large division quarterfinal
1971	Bakersfield	7–2	4–2	T–2nd	
1972	Bakersfield	3–6	2–3	T–3rd	
1973	Bakersfield	6–4	2–3	T–4th	
1974	Bakersfield	8–2	3–2	3rd	
1975	Bakersfield	7–2–1	3–2–1	4th	
1976	Bakersfield	11–1	6–0	1st	W Potato Bowl, W Junior Rose Bowl
1977	Bakersfield	7–4	4–2	T–2nd	
1978	Bakersfield	6–4	3–3	T–4th	
1979	Bakersfield	7–4	3–2	3rd	W Potato Bowl
1980	Bakersfield	5–4–1	2–4	5th	
1981	Bakersfield	9–2	6–0	1st	W Potato Bowl
1982	Bakersfield	4–6			
1983	Bakersfield	5–5	1–4	5th	
Bakersfield:		121–49–2			
Total:		121–49–2			
National championship Conference title Conference division title or championship game berth
