= Stuart Vaughan (American football) =

American football player (1936–2021)

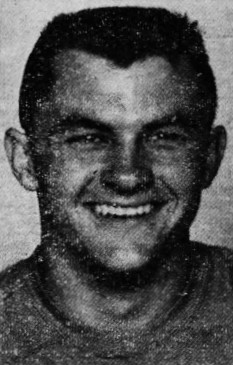
- Vaughan, circa 1957

No. 22
- Position: Halfback

Personal information
- Born: March 19, 1936; San Angelo, Texas, U.S.
- Died: August 15, 2021 (aged 85)
- Listed height: 5 ft 8 in (1.73 m)
- Listed weight: 155 lb (70 kg)

Career information
- College: Utah (1957)

Awards and highlights
- NCAA receiving leader (1957)

Stuart Reeves Vaughan (March 19, 1936 – August 15, 2021) was an American football player. He played college football for the Utah Utes and led the NCAA major colleges in 1957 in both total receptions and receiving yards.

== Early life ==
Vaughan was born in San Angelo, Texas on March 19, 1936. He grew up in San Angelo and played football at San Angelo High School. He was not recruited by Southwest Conference schools due to his small size and a knee injury sustained in high school.

== Utah Utes ==
Vaughan enrolled at the University of Utah where he played college football for Jack Curtice's Utah Utes football teams in 1956 and 1957. In 1957, he caught 53 passes for 756 yards and five touchdowns in 10 games. He led the NCAA major colleges in 1957 in both total receptions and receiving yards. Paired with Utah quarterback Lee Grosscup, Vaughan broke Skyline Conference receiving records, and both were selected as first-team all-conference players. He was also selected by Coach and Athlete publication as the Mountain States player of the year for 1957.

== Later life and death ==
Vaughan enlisted in the United States Marine Corps and played for the Quantico Marines Devil Dogs football team, leading Quantico to the 1959 national service championship with a 90-0 victory in the Shrimp Bowl. He continued in the Marine Corps during the Vietnam War, attaining the rank of major and receiving a Purple Heart.

In August 2015, the Deseret News ranked Vaughan No. 62 on its list of the 100 greatest players in Utah football history.

Vaughan died on August 15, 2021, at the age of 85.

== See also ==
- List of college football yearly receiving leaders
