= Overton Curtis =

American football player (1936–1991)

Utah State Aggies
- Position: Halfback

Personal information
- Born: June 10, 1936; Vidalia, Louisiana, U.S.
- Died: December 15, 1991 (age 55); Las Vegas, Nevada, U.S.
- Listed height: 5 ft 10 in (1.78 m)
- Listed weight: 176 lb (80 kg)

Career information
- College: San Bernardino Valley College (1955–1956); Utah State (1957–1958)

Awards and highlights
- NCAA kickoff return leader (1957); First-team All-Skyline Conference (1957)

Overton Curtis (June 10, 1936 – December 15, 1991) was an American football player. Curtis was born in Vidalia, Louisiana in 1936, grew up in Las Vegas, Nevada, and began his college football career at San Bernardino Valley College in 1955. He transferred to Utah State University and played at the halfback position for the Utah State Aggies football team from 1957 to 1958. As a junior in 1957, he totaled 616 rushing yards and led the NCAA major colleges in both kickoff return yardage (695 yards) and yards per kickoff return (30.2). He was also the #2 scorer in the Skyline Conference with 63 points on nine touchdowns, six extra points, and one field goal, and was selected as a first-team halfback on the 1957 All-Skyline Conference football team. As a senior in 1958, he missed four games due to an ankle injury but still finished ninth among major college players in kickoff return yards per carry. In February 1959, he signed a contract to play professional football for the Pittsburgh Steelers.

== See also ==
- List of NCAA major college yearly punt and kickoff return leaders
