= Marion Probert =

American football player and surgeon (1933–1965)

No. 81
- Position: Defensive end
- Class: 1955

Personal information
- Born: June 17, 1933; Provo, Utah, U.S.
- Died: November 27, 1965 (aged 32); Riverton, Utah, U.S.
- Listed height: 6 ft 1 in (1.85 m)
- Listed weight: 180 lb (82 kg)

Career information
- High school: Inglewood (Inglewood, California)
- College: BYU (1952–1954)

Awards and highlights
- 3× First-team All-MSAC (1952–1954); BYU Cougars No. 81 retired

Marion Earl Probert (June 17, 1933 – November 27, 1965) was an American college football defensive end and surgeon. He played for the BYU Cougars from 1951 to 1955. On November 27, 1965, Probert and twelve others were killed in a plane crash while en route to a BYU football game.

== Early life ==
Probert was born in Provo, Utah on June 17, 1933. He attended Inglewood High School in California where he found success playing football. During each of his three years playing for Inglewood, he was named to the All-Bay League, and during his senior year he was named as a high school All-American.

== College career ==
Probert received offers from multiple schools, including USC and Stanford, but ultimately chose to attend BYU after a conversation with Latter-day Saint apostle, Matthew Cowley. At BYU, Probert became the first athlete to letter during all four years of attending the school. He was named to the All-Conference team for three years and received an honorable mention for All-American during his senior year. In addition to his success in football, Probert was the division commander of the local Air Force ROTC.

== Later life and death ==
After graduating from BYU, Probert received offers to play football professionally, but he chose instead to pursue a career in medicine. He earned a medical degree from the University of Pennsylvania and returned to Utah where he worked at Cottonwood LDS Hospital.

On November 27, 1965, Probert and twelve others were killed when their Douglas DC-3 crashed onto a hill near Camp Williams. Probert was among eight passengers who had chartered the flight to Albuquerque, New Mexico to attend the Western Athletic Conference championship game between BYU and the University of New Mexico. After hearing news about the crash, the BYU football team dedicated the game to the victims, and BYU won the game 42–8.

In 1977, BYU retired Probert's jersey number and inducted him into the BYU Athletic Hall of Fame.
