= John Kapele =

American football player (1937–2017)

No. 64, 77
- Positions: Defensive end, defensive tackle, offensive tackle

Personal information
- Born: October 19, 1937; Honolulu, Hawaii, U.S.
- Died: June 28, 2017 (aged 79); Kaneohe, Hawaii, U.S.
- Listed height: 6 ft 0 in (1.83 m)
- Listed weight: 240 lb (109 kg)

Career information
- High school: Kaneohe (HI) James B. Castle
- College: Utah; BYU
- NFL draft: 1960: 10th round, 114th overall pick
- AFL draft: 1960

Career history
- Pittsburgh Steelers (1960–1962); Philadelphia Eagles (1962)

Career NFL statistics
- Fumble recoveries: 1
- Sacks: 1
- Stats at Pro Football Reference

John Kapele (October 19, 1937 – June 28, 2017) was an American football defensive end and defensive tackle. He played for the Pittsburgh Steelers from 1960 to 1962 and for the Philadelphia Eagles in 1962.

He died on June 28, 2017, in Kaneohe, Hawaii at age 79.
