= Reed Henderson =

Canadian football player (1934–2021)

No. 65 – Edmonton Eskimos
- Position: Tackle

Personal information
- Born: June 15, 1934; Logan, Utah, U.S.
- Died: September 25, 2021 (aged 87); Nampa, Idaho, U.S.
- Listed height: 6 ft 1 in (1.85 m)
- Listed weight: 235 lb (107 kg)

Career information
- College: Utah State
- NFL draft: 1956: 15th round, 171st overall pick

Career history
- 1956–1957: Edmonton Eskimos

Awards and highlights
- Grey Cup champion (1956)

Reed Lynn Henderson (June 15, 1934 – September 25, 2021) was an American professional football player who played for the Edmonton Eskimos. He won the Grey Cup with the Eskimos in 1956. He attended Utah State University.
