= 1999 New York Giants season =

NFL team season

- Owner: Wellington Mara; Preston Robert Tisch
- General manager: Ernie Accorsi
- Head coach: Jim Fassel
- Home stadium: Giants Stadium

Results
- Record: 7–9
- Division place: 3rd NFC East
- Playoffs: Did not qualify
- Pro Bowlers: 2: DE Michael Strahan; LB Jessie Armstead

The 1999 season was the New York Giants' 75th in the National Football League (NFL) and their third under head coach Jim Fassel. The team failed to improve on their 8–8 record from the previous season, winning only seven games and missing the playoffs for the second consecutive season. This was the last season that the team had the script "GIANTS" on the helmet, being replaced with the NY logo for the 2000 season.

== Offseason ==
=== NFL draft ===
1999 New York Giants draft
Round	Pick	Player	Position	College	Notes
1	19	Luke Petitgout	T	Notre Dame	
2	49	Joe Montgomery	RB	Ohio State	
3	79	Dan Campbell	TE	Texas A&M	
4	112	Sean Bennett	RB	Northwestern	
5	149	Mike Rosenthal	T	Notre Dame	
6	189	Lyle West	S	San Jose State	
6	205	Andre Weathers	CB	Michigan	
7	225	Ryan Hale	DT	Arkansas	
7	231	O. J. Childress	LB	Clemson	
Made roster † Pro Football Hall of Fame * Made at least one Pro Bowl during career

=== 1999 expansion draft ===
New York Giants selected during the expansion draft
Round	Overall	Name	Position	Expansion team
——	20	Kory Blackwell	CB	Cleveland Browns
——	34	Brandon Sanders	S	Cleveland Browns

== Roster ==
1999 New York Giants roster
Quarterbacks (QB): 18 Mike Cherry; 5 Kerry Collins; 10 Kent Graham; Running backs (RB): 21 Tiki Barber; 44 Sean Bennett; 34 Greg Comella FB; 23 LeShon Johnson; 25 Joe Montgomery; Wide receivers (WR): 80 Brian Alford; 88 Ike Hilliard; 84 Joe Jurevicius; 85 David Patten KR; 81 Amani Toomer; Tight ends (TE): 86 Dan Campbell; 87 Howard Cross; 83 Pete Mitchell; 89 Mark Thomas	Offensive linemen (OL): 69 Derek Engler C; 74 Scott Gragg T; 70 Toby Myles T; 72 Roman Oben T; 77 Luke Petitgout G; 78 Mike Rosenthal T; 65 Ron Stone G; 62 Jason Whittle G; 59 Brian Williams C; Defensive linemen (DL): 93 Ryan Hale DT; 75 Keith Hamilton DT; 79 Bernard Holsey DT; 94 Cedric Jones DE; 99 Christian Peter DT; 92 Michael Strahan DE; 96 George Williams III DE	Linebackers (LB): 98 Jessie Armstead; 55 Marcus Buckley; 57 O. J. Childress; 52 Scott Galyon; 51 Pete Monty; 91 Ryan Phillips; 90 Corey Widmer; Defensive backs (DB): 43 Percy Ellsworth FS; 20 Sam Garnes SS; 41 Conrad Hamilton CB; 24 Bashir Levingston KR; 39 Jeremy Lincoln CB; 26 Emmanuel McDaniel CB; 47 Brandon Sanders; 31 Jason Sehorn CB; 22 Phillippi Sparks CB; 37 Lyle West SS; 36 Shaun Williams FS; Special teams (ST): 19 Cary Blanchard K; 9 Brad Maynard P	Practice squad: 95 Frank Ferrara DE; 82 James Kidd WR; 61 Scott Kiernan G; 49 Reggie Stephens CB; 29 Tre Thomas S; Reserve: 33 Gary Brown RB (IR); 3 Brad Daluiso K (IR); 97 Robert Harris DE (IR); -- Chris Ortiz WR (IR); 53 Lance Scott C (IR); 30 Charles Way FB (IR); 35 Andre Weathers CB (IR); Rookies in italics 53 active, 7 reserve, 5 practice squad

== Preseason ==
Week	Date	Opponent	Result	Record	Venue	Recap
1	August 13	at Minnesota Vikings	W 36–21	1–0	Hubert H. Humphrey Metrodome	Recap
2	August 21	Jacksonville Jaguars	W 27–20	2–0	Giants Stadium	Recap
3	August 28	New York Jets	L 10–16	2–1	Giants Stadium	Recap
4	September 3	at Baltimore Ravens	L 24–28	2–2	M&T Bank Stadium	Recap

== Regular season ==
=== Schedule ===
Week	Date	Opponent	Result	Record	Venue	Recap
1	September 12	at Tampa Bay Buccaneers	**W** 17–13	1–0	Raymond James Stadium	Recap
2	September 19	**Washington Redskins**	**L** 21–50	1–1	Giants Stadium	Recap
3	September 26	at New England Patriots	**L** 14–16	1–2	Foxboro Stadium	Recap
4	October 3	**Philadelphia Eagles**	**W** 16–15	2–2	Giants Stadium	Recap
5	October 10	at **Arizona Cardinals**	**L** 3–14	2–3	Sun Devil Stadium	Recap
6	October 18	**Dallas Cowboys**	**W** 13–10	3–3	Giants Stadium	Recap
7	October 24	New Orleans Saints	**W** 31–3	4–3	Giants Stadium	Recap
8	October 31	at **Philadelphia Eagles**	**W** 23–17 (OT)	5–3	Veterans Stadium	Recap
9	Bye					
10	November 14	Indianapolis Colts	**L** 19–27	5–4	Giants Stadium	Recap
11	November 21	at **Washington Redskins**	**L** 13–23	5–5	Jack Kent Cooke Stadium	Recap
12	November 28	**Arizona Cardinals**	**L** 24–34	5–6	Giants Stadium	Recap
13	December 5	New York Jets	**W** 41–28	6–6	Giants Stadium	Recap
14	December 12	at Buffalo Bills	**W** 19–17	7–6	Ralph Wilson Stadium	Recap
15	December 19	at St. Louis Rams	**L** 10–31	7–7	Trans World Dome	Recap
16	December 26	Minnesota Vikings	**L** 17–34	7–8	Giants Stadium	Recap
17	January 2, 2000	at **Dallas Cowboys**	**L** 18–26	7–9	Texas Stadium	Recap
Note: Intra-division opponents are in **bold** text.

=== Game summaries ===
==== Week 1: at Tampa Bay Buccaneers ====
Week 1: New York Giants at Tampa Bay Buccaneers – Game summary

Quarter	1	2	3	4	Total
**Giants**	7	0	7	3	**17**
Buccaneers	0	10	3	0	**13**

at Raymond James Stadium, Tampa, Florida

- Date: September 12
- Game time: 4:15 p.m. EDT
- Game weather: Mostly cloudy, 88 °F (31 °C)
- Game attendance: 65,026
- Referee: Ed Hochuli
- TV announcers (Fox): Sam Rosen, Bill Maas and Chip Carter

Game information

**First quarter**

- NYG – Christian Peter 38-yard fumble return (Brad Daluiso kick), 11:37. Giants 7–0.

**Second quarter**

- TB – Martin Gramatica 23-yard field goal, 14:15. Giants 7–3. **Drive: 15 plays, 71 yards, 8:39.**
- TB – Dave Moore 1-yard pass from Trent Dilfer (Martin Gramatica kick), 0:16. Buccaneers 10–7. **Drive: 5 plays, 54 yards, 1:26.**

**Third quarter**

- NYG – Andre Weathers 8-yard interception return (Brad Daluiso kick), 3:31. Giants 14–10.
- TB – Martin Gramatica 36-yard field goal, 0:15. Giants 14–13. **Drive: 7 plays, 42 yards, 3:16.**

**Fourth quarter**

- NYG – Brad Daluiso 36-yard field goal, 12:10. Giants 17–13. **Drive: 4 plays, 6 yards, 1:36.**

**Top passers**

- NYG – Kent Graham – 12/24, 91 yards
- TB – Trent Dilfer – 15/31, 174 yards, TD, 3 INT

**Top rushers**

- NYG – Sean Bennett – 13 rushes, 24 yards
- TB – Warrick Dunn – 15 rushes, 46 yards

**Top receivers**

- NYG – Amani Toomer – 4 receptions, 36 yards
- TB – Bert Emanuel – 3 receptions, 53 yards

Down in Tampa for their first game of the 1999 season—the Giants' 75th in franchise history—their offense shriveled up in the stifling Florida heat, earning only four first downs, converting 1-of-13 third downs and gaining just 107 yards, the second-fewest in a game in franchise history, but the defense—featuring five new starters from the previous year—forced five turnovers and scored on two of them, which was enough to earn a 17–13 win over the Buccaneers.

The first takeaway came on Tampa Bay's third play from scrimmage, as quarterback Trent Dilfer was hit from behind by Jessie Armstead and lost the ball, which defensive tackle Christian Peter—starting for the injured Robert Harris—grabbed on a bounce and raced 38 yards for a touchdown.

Each team traded three-and-outs before the Buccaneers used their running back tandem of Warrick Dunn and Mike Alstott, plus a 12-yard crossing pass from Dilfer to wide receiver Jacquez Green on 3rd-and-8, to advance into New York's red zone. But on second down, Dilfer was sacked by linebacker Corey Widmer, and they were forced to settle for a 23-yard Martin Gramatica field goal at the start of the second quarter.

The Giants' offense struggled to gain traction against Tampa Bay's vaunted defensive line, as Warren Sapp frequently put pressure on quarterback Kent Graham, and rookie running back Sean Bennett—starting for the injured Gary Brown—failed to find space. It wasn't until almost five minutes remained in the first half when an 11-yard pass to Amani Toomer gave them their initial first down. Fortunately, New York's defense was equal to the task, as the swarming play of Widmer and cornerback Phillippi Sparks kept it a 7–3 game.

However, in the final minute, wide receiver Bert Emanuel beat cornerback Jeremy Lincoln—starting because of injuries to Jason Sehorn and Conrad Hamilton—down the left sideline and caught a Dilfer pass for 39 yards down to the 1-yard line. Dilfer threw a touchdown to tight end Dave Moore on the next play, giving the Buccaneers a 10–7 halftime lead.

Both offenses had their first drives of the third quarter stall near midfield, as Dilfer had a third-down snap from center Tony Mayberry go over his head before he managed to recover and throw away, and Graham had a pass to wide receiver Joe Jurevicius deflected away by cornerback Brian Kelly. After another pair of three-and-outs, Brad Maynard boomed a 52-yard punt that hopped out of bounds inside the 1; three plays later, Dilfer's pass from the end zone was intercepted by rookie cornerback Andre Weathers, who ran it in for another defensive score.

Facing boos from the crowd, Dilfer atoned near the end of the period by hitting Moore for a 26-yard gain, which led to another Gramatica field goal to cut New York's lead to 14–13. But after a Giants punt, Dilfer was pressured and picked off on the ensuing play by safety Percy Ellsworth, setting the Giants up at Tampa Bay's 24; however, New York gained only six yards in three plays, so Brad Daluiso came on and just barely made a 36-yard field goal to extend their lead to 17–13.

Three plays later, Dilfer's day went from bad to worse as he scrambled around the backfield, and then launched a deep ill-advised pass as he was heading out of bounds, where it was intercepted again by Ellsworth. Replays showed that Dilfer actually had stepped out of bounds before throwing the ball, but the Buccaneers didn't challenge the play. However, the Giants failed to capitalize on great field position, as Graham was flagged for an illegal forward pass to fullback Charles Way after crossing the line of scrimmage and then sacked by Sapp on third down to knock them out of field goal range.

Dilfer was benched for Eric Zeier on the next series, but Tampa Bay's offense fared no better, as neither team gained a first down throughout the fourth quarter. After the two-minute warning, Zeier appeared to find wide receiver Karl Williams for a 28-yard gain across midfield; but the play was reviewed in the NFL's new instant replay system, and although it appeared inconclusive, the call was reversed to an incomplete pass. Three plays later, Zeier's 4th-and-2 pass was deflected off Emanuel's hands and intercepted by Sparks, securing an ugly Giants win.

It was their third straight opening day win under head coach Jim Fassel, and the first time in three tries they had beaten Tampa Bay with him.

==== Week 2: vs. Washington Redskins ====
Week 2: Washington Redskins at New York Giants – Game summary

Quarter	1	2	3	4	Total
**Redskins**	21	12	10	7	**50**
Giants	0	14	0	7	**21**

at Giants Stadium, East Rutherford, New Jersey

- Date: September 19
- Game time: 1:00 p.m. EDT
- Game weather: Partly cloudy, 70 °F (21 °C)
- Game attendance: 73,170
- Referee: Bernie Kukar
- TV announcers (Fox): Pat Summerall, John Madden and D. J. Johnson

Game information

**First quarter**

- WAS – Stephen Davis 1-yard run (Brett Conway kick), 9:25. Redskins 7–0. **Drive: 9 plays, 68 yards, 5:35.**
- WAS – Stephen Davis 1-yard run (Brett Conway kick), 4:39. Redskins 14–0. **Drive: 5 plays, 88 yards, 2:37.**
- WAS – Stephen Davis 19-yard run (Brett Conway kick), 1:36. Redskins 21–0. **Drive: 4 plays, 54 yards, 1:46.**

**Second quarter**

- NYG – Charles Way 7-yard run (Brad Daluiso kick), 13:06. Redskins 21–7. **Drive: 10 plays, 87 yards, 5:26.**
- WAS – Shawn Barber 70-yard interception return (Brett Conway kick blocked), 3:15. Redskins 27–7.
- NYG – LeShon Johnson 11-yard run (Brad Daluiso kick), 2:16. Redskins 27–14. **Drive: 2 plays, 46 yards, 0:59.**
- WAS – Stephen Alexander 1-yard pass from Brad Johnson (run failed), 0:06. Redskins 33–14. **Drive: 10 plays, 80 yards, 2:10.**

**Third quarter**

- WAS – Brett Conway 48-yard field goal, 10:04. Redskins 36–14. **Drive: 7 plays, 31 yards, 3:54.**
- WAS – Michael Westbrook 15-yard pass from Brad Johnson (Brett Conway kick), 8:26. Redskins 43–14. **Drive: 3 plays, 17 yards, 1:23.**

**Fourth quarter**

- WAS – Stephen Alexander 27-yard pass from Brad Johnson (Brett Conway kick), 11:13. Redskins 50–14. **Drive: 11 plays, 71 yards, 6:00.**
- NYG – Ike Hilliard 7-yard pass from Kent Graham (Brad Daluiso kick), 7:12. Redskins 50–21. **Drive: 9 plays, 81 yards, 4:01.**

**Top passers**

- WAS – Brad Johnson – 20/28, 231 yards, 3 TD
- NYG – Kent Graham – 20/31, 268 yards, TD, INT

**Top rushers**

- WAS – Stephen Davis – 23 rushes, 126 yards, 3 TD
- NYG – Sean Bennett – 4 rushes, 45 yards

**Top receivers**

- WAS – Stephen Alexander – 5 receptions, 86 yards, 2 TD
- NYG – Ike Hilliard – 8 receptions, 114 yards, TD

The Giants' home opener against a revamped Redskins team coming off an epic collapse against Dallas under new owner Daniel Snyder featured a bizarre reversal from Week 1, as the defense was shredded for 50 points, their most allowed since giving up a league-record 72 in Washington back in 1966, with running back Stephen Davis setting the tone with three first-quarter touchdowns.

The Redskins took the opening kickoff and promptly drove 68 yards in nine plays, with quarterback Brad Johnson hitting wide receiver Michael Westbrook for 19 yards on 2nd-and-17 and tight end Stephen Alexander for 27 yards down to the 1-yard line, where Davis punched it in. Tiki Barber answered with a 41-yard kickoff return; but three plays later, wide receiver Ike Hilliard was flagged for offensive pass interference on a catch, which resulted in a punt.

In three plays, Washington then drove from their own 12 to New York's 9 on a 24-yard run by Davis, a 35-yard pass interference on Jeremy Lincoln, and a 20-yard screen pass to Alexander. Davis fumbled on the next play, but recovered, and scored again two plays later. After a Giants three-and-out, the Redskins took over at their own 46; aided by a roughing the passer penalty on Michael Strahan, they drove to New York's 19. On second down, Davis was stood up just beyond the line of scrimmage, but as the defense relaxed, he slipped out of Corey Widmer's grasp and raced to his left all the way for his third touchdown, making the score 21-0 still in the first quarter.

By now the crowd was booing the home team, but the Giants' offense finally woke up, with Kent Graham finding Hilliard on third down and then for 38 yards on a flea flicker. On 3rd-and-1, running back LeShon Johnson was dropped for a loss by defensive end Kenard Lang; they went for it on fourth down, and Graham found tight end Pete Mitchell for a first down into the red zone. Two plays later, Charles Way rumbled in from the 7, giving the Giants their first offensive touchdown of the season.

The pace finally slowed down, as Washington punted on their next two possessions before New York drove down to the 20 on a 13-yard pass to Joe Jurevicius and a quarterback sneak on 3rd-and-inches. But rookie left guard Luke Petitgout was flagged for a false start on 2nd-and-2, and Graham's ensuing screen pass was read and intercepted—his first in his last 131 attempts—by linebacker Shawn Barber, who took it 70 yards the other way for a touchdown; Brett Conway's extra point was blocked by George Williams, keeping the score 27–7.

With 3:15 remaining in the first half, David Patten returned the ensuing kickoff 45 yards to Washington's 46; then Graham hit Amani Toomer for a 35-yard gain, and Johnson ran it in on the next play. But after the two-minute warning, Brad Johnson answered by completing passes to Westbrook, Albert Connell and Irving Fryar, often targeting Lincoln in coverage. Then on 3rd-and-2 from New York's 16, Lincoln was flagged again for pass interference in the end zone; Johnson hit Alexander for a touchdown on the next play with six seconds to go. Davis was stopped on the two-point conversion, but the Redskins had a 33–14 halftime lead, with the Giants committing seven penalties and being credited for 12 missed tackles.

Any thoughts of a New York comeback were quickly buried at the start of the third quarter, as the running of Davis led to a 48-yard Conway field goal, and a fumble by LeShon Johnson led to Brad Johnson finding Westbrook, who made Percy Ellsworth miss another tackle before running in for a touchdown to make the score 43–14.

The Giants got a 40-yard run by Sean Bennett and a 38-yard pass to Toomer on the ensuing drive down to the 7-yard line; but the drive stalled, and Graham was sacked on fourth down by Lang to end the threat. In the fourth quarter, Johnson hit fullback Larry Centers for 17 yards on 3rd-and-13, with multiple Giants missing tackles. Three plays later, Johnson hit an open Alexander for a 27-yard touchdown, putting Washington at 50 points for the first time since 1991.

Graham gave the Giants a garbage-time touchdown pass to Hilliard before Jim Fassel benched him for free agent acquisition Kerry Collins, who completed his first three passes before their last drive stalled at Washington's 30, with defensive back Matt Stevens getting a fourth-down interception.

It was the most points the Giants had allowed at home since giving up 52 to the Browns in 1964, on the back of four turnovers and a reported 19 missed tackles, with Davis running roughshod with 126 yards on 23 carries.

==== Week 3: at New England Patriots ====
Week 3: New York Giants at New England Patriots – Game summary

Quarter	1	2	3	4	Total
Giants	7	0	0	7	**14**
**Patriots**	0	7	6	3	**16**

at Foxboro Stadium, Foxborough, Massachusetts

- Date: September 26
- Game time: 8:20 p.m. EDT
- Game weather: Clear, 62 °F (17 °C)
- Game attendance: 59,169
- Referee: Walt Coleman
- TV announcers (ESPN): Mike Patrick, Joe Theismann, Paul Maguire and Solomon Wilcots

Game information

**First quarter**

- NYG – LeShon Johnson 6-yard pass from Kent Graham (Brad Daluiso kick), 7:48. Giants 7–0. **Drive: 10 plays, 66 yards, 5:50.**

**Second quarter**

- NE – Terry Allen 1-yard run (Adam Vinatieri kick), 8:21. Tied 7–7. **Drive: 6 plays, 64 yards, 3:32.**

**Third quarter**

- NE – Adam Vinatieri 38-yard field goal, 8:55. Patriots 10–7. **Drive: 9 plays, 45 yards, 4:48.**
- NE – Adam Vinatieri 19-yard field goal, 1:32. Patriots 13–7. **Drive: 11 plays, 58 yards, 5:18.**

**Fourth quarter**

- NE – Adam Vinatieri 41-yard field goal, 3:12. Patriots 16–7. **Drive: 12 plays, 45 yards, 5:55.**
- NYG – Tiki Barber 1-yard pass from Kent Graham (Brad Daluiso kick), 1:14. Patriots 16–14. **Drive: 12 plays, 70 yards, 1:58.**

**Top passers**

- NYG – Kent Graham – 23/36, 216 yards, 2 TD
- NE – Drew Bledsoe – 20/28, 233 yards

**Top rushers**

- NYG – Charles Way – 8 rushes, 23 yards
- NE – Terry Allen – 20 rushes, 50 yards, TD

**Top receivers**

- NYG – Amani Toomer – 7 receptions, 69 yards
- NE – Terry Glenn – 5 receptions, 95 yards

The Giants and Patriots clashed in Foxborough on Sunday Night Football, and New England came away with a 16–14 win, thanks to three Adam Vinatieri field goals and New York's inability to convert big play opportunities.

It started well for them, as defensive tackle Keith Hamilton sacked Drew Bledsoe on third down, and Kent Graham completed his first five passes, hitting Ike Hilliard for a 27-yard gain and then LeShon Johnson for a 6-yard touchdown due to blown coverage. However, their next two drives were stopped because of a miscommunication on a pass from Graham to Tiki Barber and a throw to Hilliard just out of his reach. But a stop of a third-down draw for running back Terry Allen by Michael Strahan and Cedric Jones kept the Giants up 7–0 early in the second quarter.

However, the Patriots got untracked with Bledsoe hitting wide receiver Shawn Jefferson for 11 yards on third down, and then finding Terry Glenn deep against Phillippi Sparks for 45 yards down to New York's 2-yard line; Allen scored two plays later to tie the game.

Graham answered by hitting Amani Toomer for 21 yards into Patriots' territory on the Giants' next play from scrimmage; but Johnson was stopped a yard short of the first down on 3rd-and-2, so they lined up to go for it on fourth down. However, right guard Ron Stone lurched forward before the snap, drawing a false start penalty and forcing New York to punt. The play of Percy Ellsworth, Sam Garnes and Jason Sehorn—making his first appearance since missing all of 1998 with torn knee ligaments and the preseason with a strained hamstring—limited Bledsoe's impact, but the Giants' two-minute drill wilted short of midfield, keeping the score 7–7 at halftime.

The Giants went three-and-out on their first possession of the third quarter, with Graham barely overthrowing David Patten on a deep third-down pass, while Bledsoe hit wide receiver Troy Brown for 25 yards on 3rd-and-8 to set up a 38-yard Adam Vinatieri field goal. Barber returned the ensuing kickoff all the way out to midfield, but the next three plays netted only nine yards, so New York's offense again lined up on 4th-and-1; this time they got the snap off, but Graham was stopped short on a quarterback sneak.

The passing of Bledsoe and running of Allen drove the Patriots down towards the Giants' goal line; but on third down from the 1, Bledsoe's play-action pass to tight end Ben Coates was incomplete, so they opted for the chip shot field goal to extend their lead to 13–7.

At the start of the fourth quarter, the Giants' next drive appeared to stall at New England's 40 on a third-down sack by safety Larry Whigham after Graham missed on deep throws to Hilliard and Pete Mitchell. But in the ensuing scrum over the ball, linebacker Tedy Bruschi was flagged for unsportsmanlike conduct after throwing it at Luke Petitgout and hitting him in the helmet, giving New York a first down. It led to Brad Daluiso coming on for a 41-yard field goal attempt; but he hooked it wide left, keeping them down by six with nine minutes left.

The Patriots took time off the clock by running with Allen and Bledsoe completing passes to Jefferson and Glenn, or ramming it through on a sneak on 3rd-and-inches. The drive eventually stalled, so Vinatieri kicked his third field goal of the night, putting New England up 16–7 with 3:12 to go.

With one time-out remaining, the Giants took over at their own 30; Graham picked up two quick first downs on passes to Toomer and Barber. Five plays later, he found Mitchell for 14 yards on 3rd-and-5 down to the 4-yard line, as the clock ticked under two minutes. After a run by Barber down to the 1, New York took their last time-out; passes to Mitchell and Toomer were deflected by Ty Law, which brought up fourth down. They went for it, and Graham's swing pass to Barber went for a touchdown, as he beat Bruschi to the end zone with 1:14 left. However, Daluiso's onside kick was fielded cleanly by Coates, securing a Patriots win.

New England joined the Titans as the NFL's only 3–0 teams thus far, while the Giants again struggled to run the ball without Gary Brown and with Sean Bennett suffering a sprained right knee, falling to 1–2 for the third consecutive season.

==== Week 4: vs. Philadelphia Eagles ====
Week 4: Philadelphia Eagles at New York Giants – Game summary

Quarter	1	2	3	4	Total
Eagles	9	0	3	3	**15**
**Giants**	7	3	3	3	**16**

at Giants Stadium, East Rutherford, New Jersey

- Date: October 3
- Game time: 1:00 p.m. EDT
- Game weather: Partly cloudy, 70 °F (21 °C)
- Game attendance: 73,274
- Referee: Tony Corrente
- TV announcers (Fox): Sam Rosen, Bill Maas and Don Tollefson

Game information

**First quarter**

- NYG – Ike Hilliard 9-yard pass from Kent Graham (Brad Daluiso kick), 9:07. Giants 7–0. **Drive: 11 plays, 57 yards, 4:26.**
- PHI – Phillippi Sparks tackled in end zone by Charles Johnson for a safety, 3:09. Giants 7–2.
- PHI – Bobby Taylor 18-yard interception return (Norm Johnson kick), 0:00. Eagles 9–7.

**Second quarter**

- NYG – Brad Daluiso 35-yard field goal, 0:06. Giants 10–9. **Drive: 10 plays, 56 yards, 2:11.**

**Third quarter**

- NYG – Brad Daluiso 25-yard field goal, 7:49. Giants 13–9. **Drive: 15 plays, 72 yards, 7:11.**
- PHI – Norm Johnson 26-yard field goal, 3:11. Giants 13–12. **Drive: 4 plays, 5 yards, 1:31.**

**Fourth quarter**

- PHI – Norm Johnson 32-yard field goal, 12:37. Eagles 15–13. **Drive: 9 plays, 44 yards, 2:55.**
- NYG – Brad Daluiso 23-yard field goal, 7:43. Giants 16–15. **Drive: 11 plays, 67 yards, 4:54.**

**Top passers**

- PHI – Doug Pederson – 6/15, 75 yards, 2 INT
- NYG – Kent Graham – 15/29, 171 yards, TD, 3 INT

**Top rushers**

- PHI – Duce Staley – 21 rushes, 62 yards
- NYG – Gary Brown – 27 rushes, 87 yards

**Top receivers**

- PHI – Charles Johnson – 3 receptions, 38 yards
- NYG – Amani Toomer – 8 receptions, 123 yards

Coming in as 9.5-point favorites against the winless Eagles, the Giants dominated in first downs (24–10) and total yards (361–174), but played a very sloppy game, turning it over five times, each one leading to points; however, their defense again bailed them out of trouble, as they came away with a 16–15 win to bump their record to 2–2.

Just like the previous week, it started promising, as their first drive featured Kent Graham hitting Amani Toomer three times for 38 yards, while Gary Brown—making his season debut after being injured in a motorcycle accident in June and then suffering a sprained MCL in their last preseason game—carried four times on the 11-play series; he fumbled on a run inside the 10-yard line, but the ball skipped out of bounds, and Graham found Ike Hilliard for a touchdown two plays later.

Late in the first quarter, quarterback Doug Pederson completed a pass to tight end Luther Broughton for 32 yards to New York's 25; but on the next play, he was intercepted by Jason Sehorn inside the 5. However, as he was being wrapped up by wide receiver Torrance Small, Sehorn foolishly tried to lateral the ball behind him to Percy Ellsworth, and the ball fell loose, eventually being covered by Phillippi Sparks in the end zone for a safety rather than giving up a touchdown.

Both teams traded three-and-outs before Graham was picked off by cornerback Bobby Taylor, who ran it back 18 yards for a touchdown on the last play of the period, giving Philadelphia a 9–7 lead. Brown rumbled 28 yards on the Giants' next play from scrimmage; but after right tackle Scott Gragg was flagged for tripping, Graham was picked off again on a high pass for Joe Jurevicius by cornerback Troy Vincent.

The Eagles methodically drove into New York territory, mainly by running the ball with Duce Staley, but Pederson's shot downfield was intercepted by Ellsworth. However, the Giants came away empty, as on a 26-yard pass to Jurevicius just outside the red zone, the ball was stripped from behind by defensive end Mike Mamula and recovered by Taylor.

With just over two minutes left in the first half, the Giants got the ball back, and Graham found a rhythm, completing passes to Hilliard, Toomer and Pete Mitchell to move them to Philadelphia's 25. Graham then scrambled for 14 yards, and an illegal contact penalty on defensive back Al Harris put the ball at the 5. But a sack by linebacker Ike Reese—which forced a fumble that Ron Stone recovered—forced New York to kick a 35-yard Brad Daluiso field goal just before halftime.

Early in the third quarter, the Giants got a 25-yard pass to Toomer, a successful quarterback sneak on 4th-and-inches, and another fortunate occurrence when a fumble on a third-down scramble by Graham was recovered by Tiki Barber for a first down. That led to another Daluiso field goal, extending New York's lead to 13–9. But after a Sean Landeta punt was downed at the 2, Graham threw into a crowd and was intercepted by linebacker Jeremiah Trotter, setting the Eagles up at the 13. Thankfully, a sack of rookie Donovan McNabb—in for the struggling Pederson—by Michael Strahan forced them to settle for a short Norm Johnson field goal.

After a New York punt, Staley fumbled on a hit by Sam Garnes, and Keith Hamilton recovered; but the Giants gave it right back when Kerry Collins—in for the struggling and concussed Graham—fumbled on a sack by defensive tackle Bill Johnson, and defensive end Mark Wheeler recovered. Three straight completions to wide receivers Dietrich Jells and Charles Johnson covered 38 yards to put the Eagles in the red zone; but another sack by Strahan forced them to kick another field goal, which nevertheless gave them a 15–13 lead early in the fourth.

Collins answered by hitting Hilliard for 28 yards and Charles Way for 16; five plays later, Brown was stopped for a loss on 3rd-and-1 at the 9-yard line, so Daluiso kicked a field goal. But Brian Dawkins was offsides on the play, so they eschewed the points for a first down; but the Giants failed to punch it in, so Daluiso came on again for a field goal to give them a 16–15 lead midway through the period.

A third-down batted pass by Hamilton forced an Eagles punt, and a 32-yard pass from Collins to Toomer over Vincent put New York at Philadelphia's 24-yard line. But on third down, a blitz forced Collins to throw it away, and he was flagged for intentional grounding, which knocked them out of field goal range.

After a Brad Maynard punt put the ball at the 10, McNabb was sacked by Hamilton and Cedric Jones, and then by Jessie Armstead on third down; with barely two minutes left but backed up at their own 3 on 4th-and-17 with two time-outs, Philadelphia chose to punt. Three straight runs by Brown picked up a first down that enabled the Giants to kneel out the remainder of the clock.

Brown rushed for 87 yards in his return to action, while Toomer had a career-high 123 yards receiving on eight catches, as the Giants won their fifth straight game over the Eagles, who extended their road winless streak to 18, albeit in a performance that made Jim Fassel "not happy at all."

==== Week 5: at Arizona Cardinals ====
Week 5: New York Giants at Oakland Raiders – Game summary

Quarter	1	2	3	4	Total
Giants	0	0	0	3	**3**
**Cardinals**	0	14	0	0	**14**

at Sun Devil Stadium, Tempe, Arizona

- Date: October 10
- Game time: 4:05 p.m. EDT/2:05 p.m. MDT
- Game weather: Sunny, 95 °F (35 °C)
- Game attendance: 49,015
- Referee: Tom White
- TV announcers (Fox): Dick Stockton, Matt Millen and Pam Oliver

Game information

**First quarter**

- No scoring plays.

**Second quarter**

- ARI – Jake Plummer 1-yard run (Chris Jacke kick), 14:58. Cardinals 7–0. **Drive: 4 plays, 30 yards, 1:25.**
- ARI – David Boston 11-yard pass from Jake Plummer (Chris Jacke kick), 0:33. Cardinals 14–0. **Drive: 8 plays, 68 yards, 3:49.**

**Third quarter**

- No scoring plays.

**Fourth quarter**

- NYG – Brad Daluiso 31-yard field goal, 10:13. Cardinals 14–3. **Drive: 11 plays, 43 yards, 4:26.**

**Top passers**

- NYG – Kerry Collins – 24/38, 202 yards, INT
- ARI – Jake Plummer – 13/19, 156 yards, TD

**Top rushers**

- NYG – Gary Brown – 18 rushes, 67 yards
- ARI – Michael Pittman – 8 rushes, 20 yards

**Top receivers**

- NYG – Ike Hilliard – 5 receptions, 78 yards
- ARI – David Boston – 8 receptions, 101 yards, TD

Kerry Collins made his first start as a Giant, but it did nothing to improve their anemic offense, as they were held without a touchdown and staggered through three quarters before penalties and communication breakdowns quelled a late rally in a 14–3 loss to the Cardinals in sweltering Arizona heat.

A promising-looking first drive that featured their back tandem of Tiki Barber, Charles Way and Gary Brown converting third downs ultimately resulted in a punt; then late in the first quarter, Collins fumbled on a tackle by defensive end Andre Wadsworth, which was recovered by safety Kwamie Lassiter. Two plays later, Jake Plummer hit rookie wide receiver David Boston deep against Jason Sehorn for 37 yards down to the 1-yard line, where Plummer would sneak it in for a touchdown.

Three plays later, Collins had a pass intercepted by Pat Tillman; sacks by Cedric Jones and Jessie Armstead forced an Arizona punt, but Collins had an overall pedestrian first half, going just 7-of-13 for 31 yards and two turnovers. The running of Brown got New York down to the Cardinals' 24, but Brad Daluiso missed wide right on a 42-yard field goal attempt late in the second.

Meanwhile, Boston was having his way against Sehorn and Phillippi Sparks, as Plummer completed six straight passes on the ensuing drive, the biggest plays a 21-yard catch-and-run by running back Michael Pittman and an 11-yard touchdown to Boston, who jumped over Sparks to make the catch with 34 seconds left, giving him seven catches for 98 yards already.

Plummer briefly left the game with a hip pointer on Arizona's first drive of the third quarter after a tackle, but former Giant Dave Brown came in and hit tight end Terry Hardy on consecutive plays for 31 yards to put them in the red zone. However, Chris Jacke's 34-yard field goal was blocked by Christian Peter, keeping the score 14–0. But it yielded no results, as the Giants had consecutive three-and-outs, with Brown being stopped for a loss on 3rd-and-1.

A 36-yard punt return by Barber finally gave New York a jump, as Collins completed a host of short passes to Pete Mitchell and Howard Cross to help set up a 31-yard Daluiso field goal with just over 10 minutes left.

After a Cardinals punt, Collins hit Ike Hilliard on 18 and 16-yard passes; however, a holding penalty on left tackle Roman Oben and a delay of game left them with a 4th-and-22, which Collins completed to Hilliard for 24 yards to Arizona's 24. Six plays later, after their third delay of game on the day, they faced 4th-and-8 from the 10; rather than kick and make it a one-possession game with four minutes remaining, they went for it, but Collins's pass against the blitz to the end zone fluttered incomplete with no receiver in the area. A sack by Simeon Rice helped quell the Giants' last scoring threat, securing a 14-3 Arizona win.

The loss snapped a four-game winning streak over the Cardinals under Jim Fassel, as the Giants earned just five first downs through three quarters, spoiling another solid defensive outing.

==== Week 6: vs. Dallas Cowboys ====
Week 6: Dallas Cowboys at New York Giants – Game summary

Quarter	1	2	3	4	Total
Cowboys	3	0	0	7	**10**
**Giants**	0	3	0	10	**13**

at Giants Stadium, East Rutherford, New Jersey

- Date: October 18
- Game time: 9:00 p.m. EDT
- Game weather: Partly cloudy, 58 °F (14 °C)
- Game attendance: 78,204
- Referee: Dick Hantak
- TV announcers (ABC): Al Michaels, Boomer Esiason and Lesley Visser

Game information

**First quarter**

- DAL – Richie Cunningham 38-yard field goal, 5:00. Cowboys 3–0. **Drive: 8 plays, 53 yards, 3:19.**

**Second quarter**

- NYG – Brad Daluiso 27-yard field goal, 2:58. Tied 3–3. **Drive: 18 plays, 80 yards, 9:47.**

**Third quarter**

- No scoring plays.

**Fourth quarter**

- NYG – Tiki Barber 85-yard punt return (Brad Daluiso kick), 7:50. Giants 10–3.
- DAL – Emmitt Smith 2-yard run (Richie Cunningham kick), 1:57. Tied 10–10. **Drive: 7 plays, 68 yards, 3:06.**
- NYG – Brad Daluiso 21-yard field goal, 0:01. Giants 13–10. **Drive: 9 plays, 77 yards, 1:56.**

**Top passers**

- DAL – Troy Aikman – 20/33, 266 yards, INT
- NYG – Kent Graham – 15/21, 183 yards

**Top rushers**

- DAL – Emmitt Smith – 22 rushes, 26 yards, TD
- NYG – Tiki Barber – 10 rushes, 35 yards

**Top receivers**

- DAL – Ernie Mills – 6 receptions, 76 yards
- NYG – Tiki Barber – 5 receptions, 73 yards

In 1998, the Giants and Cowboys had met on Monday Night Football at Giants Stadium, and Deion Sanders had an extraordinary performance with two return touchdowns and 226 all-purpose yards. But this time, it was New York's No. 21 Tiki Barber who shined on prime time, scoring on an 85-yard punt return and then having a 56-yard catch-and-run to set up a game-winning 21-yard field goal by Brad Daluiso in a 13–10 Giants thriller.

The first quarter saw New York diligently trying to keep the ball away from Sanders, as Brad Maynard's punts were high, short and aimed out of bounds. Meanwhile, a couple of foolish penalties after the whistle on Corey Widmer and Sam Garnes helped give Dallas great field position. But a dropped pitch by Emmitt Smith and a sack by Robert Harris led to Richie Cunningham coming up short on a 48-yard field goal attempt; however, a 24-yard pass from Troy Aikman to wide receiver Raghib "Rocket" Ismail on their second drive led to Cunningham converting from 38 yards out.

With Kent Graham back in the starting lineup, the Giants gained just one first down on their first three drives, while Aikman led a Dallas march into the red zone on three consecutive third-down passes to wide receiver Ernie Mills, running back Chris Warren and rookie Wane McGarity, seeing time because of a season-ending spinal injury to Michael Irvin the previous week. But on 3rd-and-12, Garnes atoned for his miscue by intercepted a pass off a deflection; and to make matters worse for the Cowboys, McGarity suffered a separated right shoulder making the tackle.

From their own 10, Graham led a long, methodical drive that saw New York convert four third downs on passes to Ike Hilliard and Pete Mitchell and runs by Barber and Gary Brown. But on 3rd-and-3 from the 12-yard line, Graham's scramble was stopped short by defensive back Izell Reese, so Daluiso kicked a 27-yard field goal to cap an 18-play possession that lasted almost 10 minutes; the 3–3 score held up until halftime.

Both teams had third-quarter drives stopped by sacks, as Graham was brought down by defensive end Kavika Pittman just beyond midfield, Aikman was almost taken for a safety by Widmer, and Graham dropped by defensive tackle Alonzo Spellman. It was still 3–3 late in the period when Aikman completed three straight passes to Ismail and Jason Tucker for 53 yards, as the Cowboys reached New York's 21; but on 3rd-and-2, the pitch to Smith was taken down for a three-yard loss. Then Jim Fassel called time-out just before time expired, forcing Cunningham to kick his 41-yard field goal into a swirling wind; the ball hit the right upright and fell no good.

A 16-yard pass to Amani Toomer put the Giants at midfield at the start of the fourth; but on 3rd-and-1, Graham play-faked to Brown and was sacked by defensive end Greg Ellis, so they punted down to the 2. Dallas got off their goal-line with a 21-yard catch-and-run by Warren due to a missed tackle by Garnes, but they would eventually punt; as Toby Gowin's kick was fielded by Barber at the 15, he slipped outside and accelerated down the left sideline all the way for a touchdown.

After an exchange of three-and-outs, the Cowboys took over at their own 32 with 5:03 remaining; Aikman found Mills, who slipped a Jason Sehorn tackle and took it 36 yards, and then hit Ismail for 16 into the red zone. Then a nine-yard pass to Warren on 3rd-and-9 put the ball at the 6; two plays later, Smith—who only rushed for 26 yards on 22 carries—scored from the 2, tying the game at 10 just after the two-minute warning.

Starting at their own 19 with two time-outs left, the Giants picked up first downs on a run by Charles Way on 3rd-and-inches and an 11-yard pass to Joe Jurevicius. With 39 seconds to go, Graham dumped a soft pass out to Barber, who accelerated between two defenders, eluded a tackle by defensive back Singor Mobley, and took off down the right sideline before Sanders finally knocked him out of bounds at the 3. The Giants ran the ball twice with Graham before sending on Daluiso, whose chip shot field goal was good, putting New York up 13–10 with one second left.

On the kickoff, rather than trying a squib kick, Fassel—who had been the offensive coordinator at Stanford for the famous 1982 Cal-Stanford game—had Daluiso pooch it, which carried all the way down to Sanders at the 12. Sanders scrambled around to the 25, but as he was wrapped up by Scott Galyon, he tossed the ball to Kevin Mathis, who darted to open space across the field. He was eventually grabbed by Greg Comella, but lateraled back to Mobley, who raced the last 18 yards to the end zone. But way back at the other end, Sanders had been flagged because his pitch to Mathis was an illegal forward pass, ending the game in a harrowing Giants victory.

The win put New York at 3–3 and made for their first prime time win in their last eight tries, as Barber broke out with 231 all-purpose yards; however, it proved costly, as Daluiso tore his ACL trying to make the tackle, while Brown would also miss the remainder of the season due to cartilage damage in his knee.

==== Week 7: vs. New Orleans Saints ====
Week 7: New Orleans Saints at New York Giants – Game summary

Quarter	1	2	3	4	Total
Saints	3	0	0	0	**3**
**Giants**	7	17	7	0	**31**

at Giants Stadium, East Rutherford, New Jersey

- Date: October 24
- Game time: 1:00 p.m. EDT
- Game weather: Mostly cloudy, 54 °F (12 °C)
- Game attendance: 77,982
- Referee: Phil Luckett
- TV announcers (Fox): Sam Rosen, Bill Maas and Jim Gallagher

Game information

**First quarter**

- NYG – Kent Graham 6-yard run (Cary Blanchard kick), 3:44. Giants 7–0. **Drive: 12 plays, 80 yards, 5:56.**
- NO – Doug Brien 25-yard field goal, 0:00. Giants 7–3. **Drive: 7 plays, 60 yards, 3:44.**

**Second quarter**

- NYG – Cary Blanchard 41-yard field goal, 10:48. Giants 10–3. **Drive: 9 plays, 34 yards, 4:12.**
- NYG – Amani Toomer 27-yard pass from Kent Graham (Cary Blanchard kick), 1:03. Giants 17–3. **Drive: 8 plays, 56 yards, 2:45.**
- NYG – Joe Jurevicius 53-yard pass from Kent Graham (Cary Blanchard kick), 0:00. Giants 24–3. **Drive: 5 plays, 78 yards, 0:32.**

**Third quarter**

- NYG – Joe Montgomery 12-yard run (Cary Blanchard kick), 4:07. Giants 31–3. **Drive: 1 play, 12 yards, 0:06.**

**Fourth quarter**

- No scoring plays.

**Top passers**

- NO – Billy Joe Tolliver – 14/33, 176 yards, 3 INT
- NYG – Kent Graham – 19/29, 239 yards, 2 TD, INT

**Top rushers**

- NO – Ricky Williams – 24 rushes, 111 yards
- NYG – LeShon Johnson – 18 rushes, 36 yards

**Top receivers**

- NO – Eddie Kennison – 5 receptions, 62 yards
- NYG – Pete Mitchell – 5 receptions, 69 yards

Through six games, the Giants' offense had scored just six touchdowns; but against the 1–4 Saints, they finally broke out for a 31–3 rout, as Kent Graham threw two touchdown passes—including a 53-yard Hail Mary heave to Joe Jurevicius before halftime—and they converted on 10-of-17 third downs.

It seemed to start business as usual, as their first drive featuring a 25-yard pass to Pete Mitchell was derailed by a holding penalty and a sack allowed by left guard Jason Whittle, making his first career start for the injured Luke Petitgout. But after a New Orleans punt, the Giants got a 23-yard catch-and-run by Amani Toomer and a 24-yard run by Ike Hilliard on a double reverse. Passes to Mitchell and Hilliard took them down inside the 5-yard line before Graham scrambled and ran in for a touchdown, the offense's first in their last 12 quarters.

On the ensuing series, quarterback Billy Joe Tolliver—starting for the injured Billy Joe Hobert—hit fullback Aaron Craver for 29 yards, and then rookie Ricky Williams ran for 22, setting up a 25-yard Doug Brien field goal on the last play of the first quarter.

A 32-yard kickoff return by undrafted rookie Bashir Levingston and a personal foul penalty on linebacker Mark Fields aided New York's next march; despite Ron Stone's holding penalty negating a third-down conversion by Tiki Barber, they still ended with a 41-yard field goal by Cary Blanchard, just signed four days earlier to replace the injured Brad Daluiso.

The Saints missed a big chance soon after when they tried a halfback option pass with Lamar Smith, whose pass to a wide open Eddie Kennison fell short of the mark. It was still 10–3 late in the period when Graham hit Toomer and Mitchell for first downs before lobbing one to Toomer in the corner of the end zone for a score with 1:03 remaining. After a New Orleans three-and-out, the Giants drove up to their own 47-yard line with six seconds left; Graham launched a pass deep into the end zone, where it was deflected by safety Sammy Knight right into the hands of Jurevicius, who had snuck behind the crowd of defenders for his first NFL touchdown in dramatic fashion.

Leading 24–3 in the third quarter, Graham completed third-down passes to Mitchell and Jurevicius, but was then intercepted by linebacker Keith Mitchell. The Saints ran four straight times with Williams for 40 yards; but three plays later, Tolliver was intercepted by Percy Ellsworth. New York went three-and-out, but Tolliver's next pass was picked off again, this time by Jessie Armstead, who rumbled 31 yards down to the 12. On the next play, rookie running back Joe Montgomery spun off a tackle and barreled into the end zone, making the score 31–3.

New Orleans's first two drives of the fourth were stopped because of a sack by Cedric Jones and a deflected fourth-down pass by Jason Sehorn after Tolliver had completed five straight passes to get them inside the 5. A poor Brad Maynard punt helped put the Saints back in the red zone, but Tolliver was immediately picked off by linebacker Ryan Phillips with just over two minutes left. Montgomery fumbled it back to the Saints, but with Danny Wuerffel now under center, New Orleans failed on four plays from inside the 3 to end the game.

The 28-point margin of victory was New York's largest under Jim Fassel, moving their record up to 4-3 and sending the Saints to their fifth straight loss, despite Montgomery, Ellsworth, Robert Harris and Shaun Williams all suffering significant injuries.

==== Week 8: at Philadelphia Eagles ====
Week 8: New York Giants at Philadelphia Eagles – Game summary

Quarter	1	2	3	4	OT	Total
**Giants**	3	0	0	14	6	**23**
Eagles	3	14	0	0	0	**17**

at Veterans Stadium, Philadelphia, Pennsylvania

- Date: October 31
- Game time: 1:00 p.m. EST
- Game weather: Mostly cloudy, 63 °F (17 °C)
- Game attendance: 66,481
- Referee: Gerry Austin
- TV announcers (Fox): Sam Rosen, Bill Maas and Don Tollefson

Game information

**First quarter**

- PHI – Norm Johnson 28-yard field goal, 6:40. Eagles 3–0. **Drive: 10 plays, 40 yards, 4:32.**
- NYG – Cary Blanchard 28-yard field goal, 0:00. Tied 3–3. **Drive: 8 plays, 45 yards, 2:54.**

**Second quarter**

- PHI – Duce Staley 28-yard run (Norm Johnson kick), 5:30. Eagles 10–3. **Drive: 9 plays, 75 yards, 5:17.**
- PHI – Torrance Small 84-yard pass from Doug Pederson (Norm Johnson kick), 2:32. Eagles 17–3. **Drive: 2 plays, 86 yards, 0:21.**

**Third quarter**

- No scoring plays.

**Fourth quarter**

- NYG – LeShon Johnson 2-yard run (Cary Blanchard kick), 13:07. Eagles 17–10. **Drive: 16 plays, 83 yards, 8:59.**
- NYG – Pete Mitchell 7-yard pass from Kent Graham (Cary Blanchard kick), 2:00. Tied 17–17. **Drive: 2 plays, 5 yards, 0:43.**

**Overtime**

- NYG – Michael Strahan 44-yard interception return, 10:36. Giants 23–17.

**Top passers**

- NYG – Kent Graham – 26/41, 240 yards, TD
- PHI – Doug Pederson – 18/28, 256 yards, TD, 2 INT

**Top rushers**

- NYG – Kent Graham – 5 rushes, 41 yards
- PHI – Duce Staley – 26 rushes, 97 yards, TD

**Top receivers**

- NYG – Tiki Barber – 4 receptions, 43 yards
- PHI – Torrance Small – 4 receptions, 119 yards, TD

What looked for three quarters like a loss against their division rivals became a dramatic comeback win by the Giants over the Eagles, capped off by Michael Strahan's 44-yard interception return for a touchdown in overtime.

On Philadelphia's second possession, they handed off to Duce Staley seven times for 32 yards before eventually settling for a 28-yard Norm Johnson field goal. After an exchange of three-and-outs, Kent Graham hit LeShon Johnson for a 28-yard gain down into the red zone; however, New York would also settle for a field goal by Cary Blanchard, tying the game on the last play of the first quarter.

Three plays from scrimmage later, Doug Pederson's slant pass for Torrance Small was intercepted by Jessie Armstead, setting the Giants up at the Eagles' 36-yard line. But after a 12-yard pass to Howard Cross took them to the 9, Cross was called for holding, and Blanchard's ensuing 34-yard field goal missed wide right.

Philadelphia then drove 75 yards in nine plays, with Staley rushing for 15, catching a pass for 16, and then breaking loose for 21 and a touchdown after he appeared stopped at the line, on a series reminiscent of New York's abhorrent tackling against the Redskins in Week 2. A 3rd-and-1 stuff of LeShon Johnson led to a punt; two plays later, Pederson threw deep down the left sideline to Small, who got away from a diving Sehorn and went 84 yards for a touchdown, the longest the Giants had allowed from scrimmage since 1975.

Trailing 17–3 with just over two minutes left in the first half, Graham hit Tiki Barber for 14 yards, ran for another 14, and then found Ike Hilliard on 3rd-and-16 for 20. A 12-yard pass to Joe Jurevicius got them to Philadelphia's 23 with 11 seconds to go; but Roman Oben was flagged 15 yards for grabbing the face mask of Ike Reese on a Graham sack, knocking New York out of field goal range. Graham's Hail Mary pass was caught out of bounds by Amani Toomer as the half ended.

The Giants had another promising drive fizzle early in the third quarter after back-to-back plays by Cross and Charles Way put them at the Eagles' 32 when Graham was sacked on 3rd-and-2 by defensive end Greg Jefferson.

But after a Philadelphia punt, Graham overcame a 3rd-and-15 with a 16-yard pass to Pete Mitchell, a 3rd-and-12 with a 25-yard pass to Toomer on the run, and a 4th-and-1 with a handoff to Johnson; Johnson then scored from the 2, cutting the Eagles' lead to 17–10 at the start of the fourth.

Both teams punted before a 28-yard punt return by Allen Rossum and a 25-yard catch by Charles Johnson put the Eagles just outside the red zone. Four plays later, Norm Johnson came on for a 33-yard field goal; but it was blocked by Christian Peter, keeping it a seven-point game with six and a half minutes remaining. However, the Giants failed to capitalize on their next two drives, as Graham was sacked by Reese and then flagged for throwing an illegal forward pass after crossing the line when he would've had the first down.

With barely three minutes to go, Brad Maynard's 63-yard punt was downed by Bashir Levingston at the 3; Staley and Pederson narrowly avoided getting tackled for a safety on consecutive plays before Staley was stripped of the ball by Keith Hamilton, and Andre Weathers recovered at the 5. Two plays later, Graham hit Mitchell in the back of the end zone, tying the game at 17.

Pederson worked the ball past midfield on passes to Staley and Charles Johnson, although he just missed on a pass to the latter that would've gone for a big gain. He was sacked by Sam Garnes on the next play, but then hit Johnson for 13 yards, setting up fourth down at the Giants' 41 with eight seconds left. Rather than go for it, the Eagles sent in their long-distance kicker David Akers—who had just made his first NFL field goal the week before—for a 59-yard try; it fell short, and Graham's Hail Mary was knocked down in the end zone.

New York went three-and-out to begin overtime, and a 3rd-and-7 pass from Pederson to Johnson went for 22 yards across the 50, as Sehorn was again beaten on the play. After gaining two yards on consecutive Staley runs, Pederson's third-down pass from New York's 45 was tipped at the line by Peter and snatched by Strahan, who outran the offensive linemen all the way to the end zone, giving the Giants a thrilling 23–17 win.

The victory snapped New York's 12-game losing streak when trailing after three quarters and put them at 5–3 on the year, putting them in second place a half-game behind Washington for first place in the NFC East, while Peter was named NFC Special Teams Player of the Week.

==== Week 10: vs. Indianapolis Colts ====
Week 10: Indianapolis Colts at New York Giants – Game summary

Quarter	1	2	3	4	Total
**Colts**	7	0	17	3	**27**
Giants	0	6	0	13	**19**

at Giants Stadium, East Rutherford, New Jersey

- Date: November 14
- Game time: 1:00 p.m. EST
- Game weather: Overcast, 56 °F (13 °C)
- Game attendance: 78,081
- Referee: Bob McElwee
- TV announcers (CBS): Ian Eagle and Mark May

Game information

**First quarter**

- IND – Marvin Harrison 19-yard pass from Peyton Manning (Mike Vanderjagt kick), 0:48. Colts 7–0. **Drive: 9 plays, 97 yards, 4:15.**

**Second quarter**

- NYG – Cary Blanchard 33-yard field goal, 12:09. Colts 7–3. **Drive: 7 plays, 52 yards, 3:39.**
- NYG – Cary Blanchard 42-yard field goal, 2:45. Colts 7–6. **Drive: 10 plays, 37 yards, 4:39.**

**Third quarter**

- IND – Marvin Harrison 57-yard pass from Peyton Manning (Mike Vanderjagt kick), 9:06. Colts 14–6. **Drive: 3 plays, 80 yards, 1:19.**
- IND – Mike Vanderjagt 40-yard field goal, 4:24. Colts 17–6. **Drive: 7 plays, 25 yards, 3:11.**
- IND – Terrence Wilkins 39-yard punt return (Mike Vanderjagt kick), 2:44. Colts 24–6.

**Fourth quarter**

- NYG – Amani Toomer 33-yard pass from Kent Graham (pass failed), 14:17. Colts 24–12. **Drive: 8 plays, 80 yards, 3:27.**
- IND – Mike Vanderjagt 35-yard field goal, 11:37. Colts 27–12. **Drive: 5 plays, 63 yards, 2:40.**
- NYG – Pete Mitchell 7-yard pass from Kent Graham (Cary Blanchard kick), 6:50. Colts 27–19. **Drive: 13 plays, 72 yards, 4:47.**

Top passers

- IND – Peyton Manning – 20/35, 237 yards, 2 TD, INT
- NYG – Kent Graham – 27/50, 253 yards, 2 TD, 2 INT

Top rushers

- IND – Edgerrin James – 16 rushes, 108 yards
- NYG – Tiki Barber – 9 rushes, 57 yards

Top receivers

- IND – Marvin Harrison – 6 receptions, 109 yards, 2 TD
- NYG – Ike Hilliard – 6 receptions, 78 yards

After their bye week, the Giants were tied with the Redskins for first place in the NFC East, and hosted the 6–2 Colts; but their post-bye week blues continued, as a late rally was spoiled by two lost fumbles in the last five minutes, resulting in a bitter 27–19 loss.

Both offenses struggled in the early going, as Tiki Barber stumbled on a third-down screen pass attempt, while Peyton Manning was intercepted on his third drive by Sam Garnes. But after Brad Maynard punted down to the 3-yard line, Manning completed 4-of-5 passes to rookie Edgerrin James and tight ends Marcus Pollard and Ken Dilger for 51 yards. He missed a wide-open Terrence Wilkins on the next play, but then drew a 27-yard pass interference penalty on Phillippi Sparks when he tried to hit Marvin Harrison deep; one play later, Manning found Harrison for a touchdown late in the first quarter.

New York answered with a 17-yard run by Charles Way and a 14-yard gain on a pass interference by cornerback Tyrone Poole, but a reverse to Ike Hilliard and a dump-off pass to LeShon Johnson both lost yards, and they ended up settling for a 33-yard Cary Blanchard field goal.

Indianapolis drove into Giants territory with a mix of short runs by James and passes by Manning; but after Sparks tackled Harrison inches short of a first down, the Colts went for it from New York's 39, and James tripped over Manning on the handoff and went down short of the mark. Midway through the second quarter, Kent Graham hit his next three passes before a 15-yard run by Barber on a draw took them to the Colts' 26; but the drive stalled, so Blanchard kicked his second field goal to cut the deficit to 7–6.

An offensive pass interference on Harrison led to Indianapolis going three-and-out, and a 28-yard punt return by Barber gave the Giants the ball at the Colts' 49 with 1:03 left in the first half. Two passes to Barber and Pete Mitchell picked up 13 yards; but after Graham's end zone shot to Amani Toomer was caught out of bounds, his next pass was deflected off Hilliard and intercepted by former Giant safety Tito Wooten.

The first drive of the third quarter saw New York handing off to Barber four times for 36 yards, as they reached the edge of the red zone; but after Roman Oben was called for holding on former Giant defensive end Chad Bratzke, Graham's deep pass for Joe Jurevicius was picked off by another former Giant Thomas Randolph, although he appeared to lose possession of the ball as he fell out of bounds.

After a holding penalty, Manning's 2nd-and-20 screen pass to James went for 33 yards, as Jeremy Lincoln and linebacker Marcus Buckley whiffed on tackles; then he threw deep to Harrison, who beat Sparks and safety Brandon Sanders—the latter recently re-signed by the Giants due to injuries after leaving him unprotected in the 1999 NFL expansion draft, cut by the Browns in August, then cut again by the Giants in September—for a 57-yard touchdown. A short Maynard punt and three straight Manning completions led to a 40-yard Mike Vanderjagt field goal, extending the Colts' lead to 17–6.

On the ensuing drive, a holding call on Luke Petitgout and a sack by defensive tackle Ellis Johnson left Maynard punting from the back of his end zone; another short kick was fielded by Wilkins at New York's 39, where he zig-zagged all the way for a touchdown.

Near the end of the period, Graham hit Toomer twice for 23 yards, and then found Jurevicius for 18 on 3rd-and-15, the Giants' first conversion of the game; two plays later, he went deep for Toomer, who outworked defensive back Tony Blevins for a 33-yard touchdown. The two-point throw was knocked away, but the deficit had been cut to 24–12 at the start of the fourth quarter. However, their momentum quickly vanished, as after a failed challenge of a Wilkins fumbled touchback, James broke through the line and raced 72 yards—stiff-arming Jason Sehorn for roughly 20 of them—down to the 8; thankfully, the defense held the Colts to a field goal, making the score 27–12.

Needing two touchdowns, Graham moved New York across midfield with passes to Barber, Mitchell and LeShon Johnson; back-to-back throws to Hilliard picked up 23 yards and put the ball on the 10-yard line. After a successful quarterback sneak on 3rd-and-inches, Graham hit Mitchell for a touchdown, cutting their deficit to 27–19 with just under seven minutes remaining.

Indianapolis went three-and-out, but on the third play of the next drive, Johnson had the ball stripped from behind on a 17-yard run by safety Chad Cota and recovered by Blevins; the defense, however, made another stand, as a hit by Jessie Armstead forced an incompletion on third down, and a 32-yard punt return by Barber put the Giants at the Colts' 47 with 3:36 to go.

With one time-out remaining, Graham completed passes to Barber and Toomer for 21 yards; they lost 10 of them due to holding on center Brian Williams, but Graham hit Hilliard for 15, down to the Colts' 18 as the clock ticked under two minutes. Graham's next pass was caught by Mitchell near the first down, but as he turned, the ball was knocked out by linebacker Cornelius Bennett and recovered by Wooten for New York's fourth and most critical turnover; two Manning kneel-downs ended the game.

Despite the loss that made the Giants 2–9 in games after the bye week, the Giants remained in a three-way tie atop the division with the Redskins and Cowboys at 5–4, setting up a crucial rematch in Washington next week.

==== Week 11: at Washington Redskins ====
Week 11: New York Giants at Washington Redskins – Game summary

Quarter	1	2	3	4	Total
Giants	0	6	0	7	**13**
**Redskins**	7	3	3	10	**23**

at Jack Kent Cooke Stadium, Landover, Maryland

- Date: November 21
- Game time: 4:15 p.m. EST
- Game weather: Mostly cloudy, 58 °F (14 °C)
- Game attendance: 78,641
- Referee: Bill Carollo
- TV announcers (Fox): Kenny Albert, Tim Green and Brett Haber

Game information

**First quarter**

- WAS – Stephen Davis 1-yard run (Brett Conway kick), 7:03. Redskins 7–0. **Drive: 8 plays, 55 yards, 3:24.**

**Second quarter**

- NYG – Cary Blanchard 44-yard field goal, 10:57. Redskins 7–3. **Drive: 4 plays, 4 yards, 0:53.**
- WAS – Brett Conway 24-yard field goal, 7:02. Redskins 10–3. **Drive: 7 plays, 65 yards, 3:55.**
- NYG – Cary Blanchard 44-yard field goal, 0:00. Redskins 10–6. **Drive: 7 plays, 71 yards, 1:40.**

**Third quarter**

- WAS – Brett Conway 21-yard field goal, 1:14. Redskins 13–6. **Drive: 8 plays, 26 yards, 4:35.**

**Fourth quarter**

- WAS – Marco Coleman 42-yard fumble return (Brett Conway kick), 14:51. Redskins 20–6.
- NYG – Charles Way 1-yard run (Cary Blanchard kick), 10:26. Redskins 20–13. **Drive: 9 plays, 71 yards, 4:25.**
- WAS – Brett Conway 37-yard field goal, 0:21. Redskins 23–13. **Drive: 9 plays, 42 yards, 3:44.**

**Top passers**

- NYG – Kerry Collins – 13/21, 221 yards, INT
- WAS – Brad Johnson – 17/29, 158 yards, INT

**Top rushers**

- NYG – Tiki Barber – 10 rushes, 44 yards
- WAS – Stephen Davis – 33 rushes, 183 yards, TD

**Top receivers**

- NYG – Ike Hilliard – 4 receptions, 101 yards
- WAS – Larry Centers – 6 receptions, 69 yards

Eager to avenge their 50–21 Week 2 defeat in their most crucial game thus far, the Giants' defense played significantly better, but still allowed 183 rushing yards to Stephen Davis, while the offense committed five turnovers in a 23–13 loss to the Redskins.

Their first two drives saw Kent Graham get sacked by defensive tackle Dana Stubblefield and safety Sam Shade, while Brad Johnson completed three straight passes to Larry Centers for 34 yards down to New York's 8-yard line. An unsportsmanlike conduct penalty on Albert Connell left them with 3rd-and-22, but Phillippi Sparks was called for a questionable pass interference; Davis scored from the 1 on the next play for his 15th touchdown of the season.

Later in the first quarter, a deep pass from Graham to Amani Toomer was intercepted by Darrell Green in the end zone, as an apparent Shade interference was not called; on the Giants' next possession, Graham's pass went off Pete Mitchell's hands and was picked off by Shade. Thankfully, the Giants got away unscathed when Brett Conway was wide right on a 38-yard field goal at the start of the second.

A sack by defensive end Marco Coleman led to another New York three-and-out, and also eventually to Graham leaving the game with a concussion after going just 3-of-10 for 36 yards; an interception by Percy Ellsworth—playing for the first time in a month because of a broken foot—put the Giants at the Redskins' 30, but they settled for a 44-yard Cary Blanchard field goal. Three plays later, Davis gashed New York for a 49-yard run into the red zone, which set up a Conway field goal that gave Washington a 10–3 lead midway through the period.

With Kerry Collins now in the game, the Giants' next drive died out because of holding on Roman Oben and a fumbled snap from Brian Williams; then Johnson hit James Thrash for 25 yards and Centers for 12, before drawing another pass interference call on a deep pass for Connell, this time against Jason Sehorn. But Davis fumbled the handoff on the next play from the 1, and Keith Hamilton recovered.

Less than two minutes remained in the first half as Collins and Charles Way picked up a first down on the ground before Collins hit Ike Hilliard deep for a 46-yard gain, which put the Giants at Washington's 40; two more short passes to Tiki Barber and Joe Jurevicius led to Blanchard making another 44-yard field goal as time expired.

Conway came up short from 50 yards out on the initial possession of the third quarter, but three plays later, Collins's pass went off Jurevicius's hands and was intercepted by linebacker Derek Smith; it led to no points, but Brad Maynard's next punt was returned 33 yards by Brian Mitchell to the Giants' 29. The Redskins handed off to Davis five times but were eventually stopped at the 3, and Conway was good on the short kick late in the period.

On the first play of the fourth, defensive end N. D. Kalu beat Oben around the edge and stripped Collins from behind, and the ball was grabbed out of the air by Coleman, who raced 42 yards for a touchdown to make the score 20–6.

Collins responded by hitting Barber and David Patten three times for 46 yards; he appeared to find Sean Bennett in the corner of the end zone for a 21-yard touchdown, but the play was ruled incomplete. However, Collins completed a pass to Toomer for 18 yards on 3rd-and-16, and Way bulled in for a touchdown two plays later. However, Davis continued to overpower New York's defense, ripping off a 23-yard run to put the Redskins into the red zone at the halfway mark of the period. But Conway continued to be the Giants' most valuable player when he was wide right on a 27-yard field goal, keeping it a seven-point game.

From their own 20, the Giants got a 17-yard run by Barber and 16-yard passes to him and Patten, which helped put them at Washington's 27 as the clock neared four minutes remaining. But for the second time in the game, Collins fumbled the snap from Williams, and Kenard Lang recovered.

It appeared the Giants would get the ball back quickly after Johnson was tackled in the backfield by Corey Widmer on the ensuing third down; but after a late hit on Ellsworth by rookie right tackle Jon Jansen, Ellsworth retaliated by jumping on his back while he was on the ground, drawing a penalty and giving Washington a first down. A 30-yard pass from Johnson to tight end James Jenkins took them down to the 13, forcing New York to use their time-outs; four plays later, Conway was good from 37 yards out, icing the game with 21 seconds to go.

The loss dropped the Giants to 5-5 and guaranteed the Redskins the divisional tie-breaker with a season sweep; one day later, Jim Fassel officially declared Collins the new starting quarterback for the rest of the season.

==== Week 12: vs. Arizona Cardinals ====
Week 12: Arizona Cardinals at New York Giants – Game summary

Quarter	1	2	3	4	Total
**Cardinals**	3	3	7	21	**34**
Giants	0	10	0	14	**24**

at Giants Stadium, East Rutherford, New Jersey

- Date: November 28
- Game time: 1:00 p.m. EST
- Game weather: Partly cloudy, 48 °F (9 °C)
- Game attendance: 77,809
- Referee: Larry Nemmers
- TV announcers (Fox): Pat Summerall, John Madden and D. J. Johnson

Game information

**First quarter**

- ARI – Chris Jacke 39-yard field goal, 5:54. Cardinals 3–0. **Drive: 11 plays, 41 yards, 5:52.**

**Second quarter**

- NYG – Kerry Collins 1-yard run (Cary Blanchard kick), 6:24. Giants 7–3. **Drive: 11 plays, 78 yards, 5:32.**
- ARI – Chris Jacke 20-yard field goal, 1:51. Giants 7–6. **Drive: 10 plays, 69 yards, 4:33.**
- NYG – Cary Blanchard 24-yard field goal, 0:02. Giants 10–6. **Drive: 9 plays, 66 yards, 1:49.**

**Third quarter**

- ARI – Rob Moore 2-yard pass from Jake Plummer (Chris Jacke kick), 11:50. Cardinals 13–10. **Drive: 5 plays, 16 yards, 1:26.**

**Fourth quarter**

- ARI – Johnny McWilliams 9-yard pass from Jake Plummer (Chris Jacke kick), 14:55. Cardinals 20–10. **Drive: 8 plays, 67 yards, 4:42.**
- NYG – Sean Bennett 1-yard run (Cary Blanchard kick), 8:51. Cardinals 20–17. **Drive: 13 plays, 88 yards, 6:04.**
- ARI – Mario Bates 2-yard run (Chris Jacke kick), 4:16. Cardinals 27–17. **Drive: 9 plays, 60 yards, 4:35.**
- ARI – Eric Swann 42-yard interception return (Chris Jacke kick), 1:57. Cardinals 34–17.
- NYG – Tiki Barber 34-yard pass from Kerry Collins (Cary Blanchard kick), 0:42. Cardinals 34–24. **Drive: 5 plays, 70 yards, 1:15.**

**Top passers**

- ARI – Dave Brown – 11/17, 126 yards
- NYG – Kerry Collins – 22/45, 298 yards, TD, 3 INT

**Top rushers**

- ARI – Mario Bates – 16 rushes, 37 yards, TD
- NYG – Tiki Barber – 10 rushes, 37 yards

**Top receivers**

- ARI – Rob Moore – 7 receptions, 102 yards, TD
- NYG – Amani Toomer – 6 receptions, 87 yards

After an emotional week that saw the Giants' defensive players taking verbal shots at their offensive teammates as well as the passing of Jim Fassel's mother Dorothy, they saw an early lead disappear due to four second-half turnovers, resulting in being swept by the Cardinals for the first time since 1979.

Arizona's second possession was prolonged by a third-down roughing the passer-by Keith Hamilton, while Dave Brown completed consecutive passes to wide receiver Rob Moore for 22 yards to set up a 39-yard field goal by Chris Jacke. Brown fumbled later on a sack by Cedric Jones and Michael Strahan recovered at the Cardinals' 33-yard line, but New York lost seven yards on the ensuing drive—with Kerry Collins completing just one of his first nine passes—and punted.

Early in the second quarter, Collins finally got the Giants' offense moving, as he hit Amani Toomer for 22 yards, Pete Mitchell for 12 on 3rd-and-8, and Ike Hilliard for 33 on 2nd-and-18 before sneaking in for a touchdown two plays later.

On the ensuing drive, Moore beat Phillippi Sparks for a 44-yard catch, and the running of Mario Bates took the Cardinals down to the 3; but the defense held as Brown missed running back Adrian Murrell on third down, so Jacke kicked a short field goal just after the two-minute warning. Collins responded by completing four straight passes to four different receivers, which resulted in a 24-yard Cary Blanchard field goal just before halftime.

But on their first possession of the third quarter, Collins's slant pass went off Toomer's hands and was intercepted by linebacker Rob Fredrickson and returned to the 16; Jake Plummer—who had replaced Brown after missing the previous four games with a broken finger—completed a pass to wide receiver Frank Sanders down to the 2, and then threw a touchdown to Moore, who outfought Sparks for the catch to give Arizona the lead.

Three plays later, Simeon Rice flew by Roman Oben for the sack, forced fumble and recovery; a sack by Jessie Armstead forced a punt, but the Giants' offense was stymied by drops and another ineffective day for the running game. Late in the period, Plummer led a 67-yard drive by hitting 5-of-5 passes, the last one a 9-yard touchdown to tight end Johnny McWilliams at the start of the fourth, putting the Cardinals up 20–10.

Collins responded by leading the Giants 88 yards in 13 plays, twice finding Mitchell for first downs and then hitting Toomer for 33 yards down to the 8. A pass interference on safety Tommy Bennett put the ball at the 1, where Sean Bennett swept in two plays later, making the score 20–17 with less than nine minutes remaining.

But Blanchard's ensuing kickoff went out of bounds to give the Cardinals the ball at the 40; the defense then let Plummer—who had thrown just three touchdowns and 14 interceptions on the year—find Sanders for 11 yards and Murrell for 23. The latter and Bates then ran Arizona most of the rest of the way, with Bates scoring from the 2, putting them back up by 10 with 4:16 left.

On the next two plays from scrimmage, Collins was sacked again by Rice and then picked off by cornerback Aeneas Williams. Jacke was wide left on the ensuing 44-yard field goal, but three plays later, Collins's screen pass for Tiki Barber was picked off and returned for a touchdown by defensive tackle Eric Swann, breaking the Giants' backs with two minutes left. Barber would score on a nifty 34-yard catch-and-run in the final minute, but Kwamie Lassiter recovered the onside kick.

The loss was New York's third in a row, with 13 turnovers coming during the span, as they had now fallen back into a tie with the Cardinals for third place in the NFC East.

==== Week 13: vs. New York Jets ====
Week 13: New York Jets at New York Giants – Game summary

Quarter	1	2	3	4	Total
Jets	0	7	0	21	**28**
**Giants**	17	10	7	7	**41**

at Giants Stadium, East Rutherford, New Jersey

- Date: December 5
- Game time: 1:00 p.m. EST
- Game weather: Sunny, 61 °F (16 °C)
- Game attendance: 78,200
- Referee: Walt Coleman
- TV announcers (CBS): Kevin Harlan and Sam Wyche

Game information

**First quarter**

- NYG – Cary Blanchard 41-yard field goal, 10:58. Giants 3–0. **Drive: 9 plays, 46 yards, 4:02.**
- NYG – Joe Montgomery 4-yard run (Cary Blanchard kick), 8:23. Giants 10–0. **Drive: 3 plays, 65 yards, 1:24.**
- NYG – Amani Toomer 61-yard pass from Kerry Collins (Cary Blanchard kick), 5:28. Giants 17–0. **Drive: 3 plays, 67 yards, 1:21.**

**Second quarter**

- NYJ – Keyshawn Johnson 13-yard pass from Ray Lucas (John Hall kick), 10:08. Giants 17–7. **Drive: 12 plays, 80 yards, 4:38.**
- NYG – Kerry Collins 1-yard run (Cary Blanchard kick), 5:09. Giants 24–7. **Drive: 9 plays, 71 yards, 4:59.**
- NYG – Cary Blanchard 31-yard field goal, 0:10. Giants 27–7. **Drive: 11 plays, 46 yards, 3:05.**

**Third quarter**

- NYG – Amani Toomer 9-yard pass from Kerry Collins (Cary Blanchard kick), 6:01. Giants 34–7. **Drive: 16 plays, 67 yards, 7:26.**

**Fourth quarter**

- NYJ – Eric Green 10-yard pass from Ray Lucas (John Hall kick), 14:47. Giants 34–14. **Drive: 4 plays, 58 yards, 1:21.**
- NYJ – Wayne Chrebet 10-yard pass from Ray Lucas (John Hall kick), 4:14. Giants 34–21. **Drive: 3 plays, 50 yards, 0:36.**
- NYG – Amani Toomer 80-yard pass from Kerry Collins (Cary Blanchard kick), 3:46. Giants 41–21. **Drive: 3 plays, 80 yards, 0:28.**
- NYJ – Wayne Chrebet 5-yard pass from Ray Lucas (John Hall kick), 0:05. Giants 41–28. **Drive: 14 plays, 81 yards, 3:41.**

**Top passers**

- NYJ – Ray Lucas – 31/48, 284 yards, 4 TD
- NYG – Kerry Collins – 17/29, 341 yards, 3 TD

**Top rushers**

- NYJ – Ray Lucas – 5 rushes, 20 yards
- NYG – Joe Mongtomery – 38 rushes, 111 yards, TD

**Top receivers**

- NYJ – Keyshawn Johnson – 10 receptions, 98 yards, TD
- NYG – Amani Toomer – 6 receptions, 181 yards, 3 TD

Before their game with the Jets and their former head coach Bill Parcells, Jim Fassel announced that quarterbacks coach Sean Payton would take over the Giants' offensive play-calling duties. The tactic paid off, as Kerry Collins threw for 341 yards and three touchdowns to Amani Toomer to lead a convincing 41–28 win.

Their first drive of the game saw them handing off to Joe Montgomery—who had missed the previous four games with a broken toe—five times, while a 33-yard catch-and-run by Ike Hilliard set up a 41-yard Cary Blanchard field goal. After a Jets' three-and-out, the Giants' next series consisted of Collins hitting Hilliard for a 34-yard gain, David Patten running for 27 yards on a double reverse, and Montgomery slicing in from the 4-yard line for a touchdown to give them an early 10–0 lead.

Meanwhile, the Jets' top-rated running game couldn't get untracked, as Curtis Martin was dropped for a five-yard loss by Michael Strahan, leading to another three-and-out; Collins then hit a slant to Toomer, who spun away from cornerback Aaron Glenn and raced 61 yards for a score. Already trailing 17–0, the Jets all but abandoned the run as the second quarter began, with quarterback Ray Lucas leading an 80-yard drive by completing 7-of-10 passes, the last one a 13-yard touchdown strike to wide receiver Keyshawn Johnson in the corner of the end zone.

A 13-yard run by Montgomery jump-started the Giants' next possession, aided by a questionable 31-yard pass interference penalty on Glenn; passes to Hilliard and Pete Mitchell took them down to the 1, where Collins scored on a quarterback sneak.

Another three-and-out followed, with Cedric Jones getting a third-down sack, and a 24-yard punt return by Tiki Barber set the Giants up at their own 40 late in the first half. Montgomery and Hilliard both picked up first downs, with the latter getting loose again for 29 yards, as they reached the 9 with just over a minute to go. But after losing seven yards on a Barber fumble that rolled out of bounds, they had to settle for a Blanchard field goal; nevertheless, their halftime lead was 27–7.

The onslaught continued in the third quarter, as the running of Montgomery, along with Collins converting on third-down passes to Hilliard, Mitchell and Toomer, carried the Giants down to the 9, where he lobbed a fade pass to Toomer in the corner of the end zone for a touchdown.

The Jets' next drive was stopped on downs at the Giants' 30, but later they finally caught a break when they picked up 47 yards on a questionable Jeremy Lincoln pass interference; four plays later, Lucas found tight end Eric Green for a touchdown off a deflection, making the score 34–14 at the start of the fourth quarter.

The Giants ran nearly six minutes off the clock with the running of Montgomery and passing of Collins before punting; but Montgomery fumbled on their next drive as he fought for a first down, and defensive end Dorian Boose recovered for the Jets at the 50. Lucas then hit three straight passes against the Giants' depleted secondary, the last one going to wide receiver Wayne Chrebet for a touchdown, tightening the score to 34–21 with 4:14 still remaining.

But just three plays later from his own 20, Collins took a deep shot to Toomer and hit him in stride, and Toomer raced 80 yards down the right sideline for a back-breaking touchdown, giving him six catches for 181 yards on the day. Lucas would eventually throw a garbage-time touchdown to Chrebet in the final seconds to finish the scoring, but the Giants were clear winners in the sibling rivalry.

Collins was named NFC Offensive Player of the Week, becoming the first Giant to throw for 300 yards since Phil Simms in 1993, as the offense gained 490 yards and went 13-of-19 on third downs. Their 41 points were the most they had scored since 1995, as Hilliard also had 121 yards receiving on six catches, while Montgomery had 38 carries for 111 yards, the Giants' only individual 100-yard rushing performance of the season. However, the win proved costly; already without Phillippi Sparks, Conrad Hamilton and Andre Weathers, they would lose Jason Sehorn—who tore his ACL in a preseason game against the Jets in 1998—to a broken leg and Brian Williams—who had missed all of the previous two years with a devastating eye injury—to a sprained knee.

==== Week 14: at Buffalo Bills ====
Week 14: New York Giants at Buffalo Bills – Game summary

Quarter	1	2	3	4	Total
**Giants**	3	10	3	3	**19**
Bills	3	7	0	7	**17**

at Ralph Wilson Stadium, Orchard Park, New York

- Date: December 12
- Game time: 1:00 p.m. EST
- Game weather: Mostly cloudy, 40 °F (4 °C)
- Game attendance: 72,527
- Referee: Bernie Kukar
- TV announcers (Fox): Sam Rosen and Bill Maas

Game information

**First quarter**

- BUF – Steve Christie 50-yard field goal, 9:16. Bills 3–0. **Drive: 8 plays, 55 yards, 3:30.**
- NYG – Cary Blanchard 42-yard field goal, 4:25. Tied 3–3. **Drive: 8 plays, 46 yards, 4:51.**

**Second quarter**

- NYG – Cary Blanchard 21-yard field goal, 12:09. Giants 6–3. **Drive: 6 plays, 24 yards, 2:39.**
- BUF – Thurman Thomas 23-yard pass from Doug Flutie (Steve Christie kick), 1:51. Bills 10–6. **Drive: 6 plays, 52 yards, 3:20.**
- NYG – Amani Toomer 14-yard pass from Kerry Collins (Cary Blanchard kick), 0:03. Giants 13–10. **Drive: 10 plays, 67 yards, 1:48.**

**Third quarter**

- NYG – Cary Blanchard 21-yard field goal, 4:28. Giants 16–10. **Drive: 12 plays, 57 yards, 5:47.**

**Fourth quarter**

- BUF – Jonathan Linton 2-yard run (Steve Christie kick), 9:34. Bills 17–16. **Drive: 6 plays, 22 yards, 2:40.**
- NYG – Cary Blanchard 48-yard field goal, 0:40. Giants 19–17. **Drive: 9 plays, 33 yards, 1:29.**

**Top passers**

- NYG – Kerry Collins – 23/44, 240 yards, TD, INT
- BUF – Doug Flutie – 15/32, 184 yards, TD, INT

**Top rushers**

- NYG – Joe Montgomery – 20 rushes, 77 yards
- BUF – Doug Flutie – 6 rushes, 25 yards

**Top receivers**

- NYG – Tiki Barber – 8 receptions, 90 yards
- BUF – Eric Moulds – 3 receptions, 55 yards

The Giants were eight-point underdogs going into Buffalo to play the 8–4 Bills, but a key defensive stop and four Cary Blanchard field goals—including a 48-yarder with 40 seconds left—secured a stunning 19–17 win.

Quarterback Doug Flutie got the Bills started fast with a 36-yard completion to wide receiver Eric Moulds, which eventually led to a 50-yard Steve Christie field goal. On the ensuing drive, Kerry Collins hit a screen pass to Tiki Barber, which went for 27 yards, leading to Blanchard converting on a 42-yard kick to tie the game at 3.

At the start of the second quarter, Flutie was sacked and fumbled by Cedric Jones, with Michael Strahan recovering at Buffalo's 28-yard line. Joe Montgomery ripped off a bruising 13-yard run, but the series stalled inside the 5, so Blanchard booted a chip shot field goal. Flutie answered with a third-down pass to Moulds and then hit Andre Reed on a crossing pattern for 30 yards, looking to exploit the Giants' battered secondary. But Christie's ensuing 39-yard field goal hit the left upright.

However, New York gave it right back when Collins fumbled the snap from center Derek Engler, and linebacker Sam Cowart recovered; the Bills went three-and-out, but Chris Mohr's punt was downed at the 1. Brad Maynard managed to boom his punt back across midfield, but Buffalo used their backfield tandem of Antowain Smith, Jonathan Linton and Sam Gash before a screen to Thurman Thomas went for a 23-yard touchdown, putting them up 10-6 just after the two-minute warning.

Starting at their 33 with two time-outs, Collins completed third-down passes to Barber and Pete Mitchell, and then hit a 20-yard catch-and-run to Ike Hilliard down to the 14 with 18 seconds remaining. Three plays later, he threw to Amani Toomer, who was crunched at the goal line by cornerback Thomas Smith and safety Kurt Schulz but held on for the touchdown catch to give New York the lead at halftime.

In the third quarter, the Bills drove to the Giants' 25 on a series of short passes and runs; but after a third-down sack by Jessie Armstead, Christie pushed his 48-yard field goal wide right. New York then picked up 27 yards on four Montgomery carries, while Collins completed a 14-yard pass to Barber and even scrambled for a first down on 2nd-and-1. But the drive again stalled, so Blanchard drilled the chip shot kick to extend their lead to 16–10.

The Bills went three-and-out, and as the game moved into the fourth, the Giants steadily drove into the red zone, with Collins hitting first-down passes to Mitchell and Hilliard, and Buffalo's linebacker John Holecek committing a roughing the passer and defensive back Ken Irvin getting flagged for pass interference. But on 3rd-and-9 from the 16, Collins had his passed tipped at the line by defensive end Shawn Price and intercepted by defensive end Marcellus Wiley, who rumbled 52 yards before Hilliard finally caught up to him.

The momentum had changed in a hurry, as Flutie hit a 13-yard pass to tight end Bobby Collins before Linton powered in from the 2, giving Buffalo the lead with nine and a half minutes left. Both teams then punted before the Giants had a third-down conversion by Barber nullified by holding on Ron Stone, resulting in Buffalo taking over with 4:42 to go, still holding a 17–16 lead.

On 3rd-and-9, the Giants appeared to have Flutie cornered for a sack, but the elusive Flutie scrambled away from Jones, Strahan and Keith Hamilton and picked up 12 yards. On 3rd-and-1 from the Giants' 36, Thomas was stopped by Hamilton for no gain, and New York took their last time-out with 2:14 remaining. The Bills went for it, but Thomas was swarmed at the line of scrimmage and stopped again in a game-saving effort.

Collins picked up a first down on short passes to Mitchell and Joe Jurevicius; a false start on Roman Oben left them with a 3rd-and-15, but he hit Barber with a quick pass over the middle, and he picked up 15 yards to Buffalo's 36. After two incompletions and another short pass to Mitchell, it was fourth down; Blanchard came on and made the go-ahead field goal.

However, a short kickoff and a 27-yard return by Peerless Price gave the Bills the ball at their own 46. But they lost 10 because of holding on Moulds as he tried to keep Shaun Williams—back after a six-week injury absence and battling a 102-degree temperature—from an interception, and Flutie's deep third-down shot to Moulds was broken up at the last moment by Jeremy Lincoln. On fourth down with six seconds left, Flutie launched a prayer that was picked off by Bashir Levingston, securing the huge Giants win.

Blanchard was named NFC Special Teams Player of the Week, as the Giants continued their perfect 9–0 regular season mark in December under Jim Fassel, but more importantly maintained a second-place tie with the 7–6 Cowboys in the NFC East.

==== Week 15: at St. Louis Rams ====
Week 15: New York Giants at St. Louis Rams – Game summary

Quarter	1	2	3	4	Total
Giants	0	0	3	7	**10**
**Rams**	3	7	7	14	**31**

at Trans World Dome, St. Louis, Missouri

- Date: December 19
- Game time: 1:00 p.m. EST/12:00 p.m. CST
- Game weather: None (indoor stadium)
- Game attendance: 66,065
- Referee: Gerry Austin
- TV announcers (Fox): Dick Stockton, Matt Millen and Pam Oliver

Game information

**First quarter**

- STL – Jeff Wilkins 47-yard field goal, 3:24. Rams 3–0. **Drive: 11 plays, 66 yards, 5:41.**

**Second quarter**

- STL – Az-Zahir Hakim 3-yard pass from Kurt Warner (Jeff Wilkins kick), 13:31. Rams 10–0. **Drive: 7 plays, 59 yards, 3:10.**

**Third quarter**

- NYG – Cary Blanchard 23-yard field goal, 10:08. Rams 10–3. **Drive: 11 plays, 69 yards, 4:52.**
- STL – Devin Bush 45-yard interception return (Jeff Wilkins kick), 5:25. Rams 17–3.

**Fourth quarter**

- STL – Az-Zahir Hakim 65-yard pass from Kurt Warner (Jeff Wilkins kick), 13:58. Rams 24–3. **Drive: 2 plays, 67 yards, 0:52.**
- STL – Mike Jones 22-yard interception return (Jeff Wilkins kick), 7:10. Rams 31–3.
- NYG – Ike Hilliard 7-yard pass from Kerry Collins (Cary Blanchard kick), 4:48. Rams 31–10. **Drive: 8 plays, 80 yards, 2:22.**

**Top passers**

- NYG – Kerry Collins – 21/37, 273 yards, TD, 2 INT
- STL – Kurt Warner – 18/32, 319 yards, 2 TD

**Top rushers**

- NYG – Joe Montgomery – 12 rushes, 41 yards
- STL – Marshall Faulk – 16 rushes, 68 yards

**Top receivers**

- NYG – Amani Toomer – 9 receptions, 162 yards
- STL – Marshall Faulk – 6 receptions, 97 yards

Against the high-powered Rams, a close game for two and a half quarters became a 31-10 St. Louis rout of the Giants thanks to two interception returns for touchdowns.

New York's offense took the field for just six plays in the first quarter, with Joe Montgomery getting stopped on 3rd-and-1, while Kurt Warner came out with big-gain passes to Marshall Faulk and rookie Torry Holt to put the Rams into Giants territory on their first two drives. Both times they settled for field goal tries, with Jeff Wilkins missing wide right from 50 yards and then converting from 47; however, New York missed a turnover opportunity when a forced fumble by Cedric Jones skipped out of Corey Widmer's grasp.

Late in the first quarter, Faulk beat Percy Ellsworth down the right sideline for a 32-yard catch down to the 19-yard line. Four plays later from the 3, Warner found wide receiver Az-Zahir Hakim in the back of the end zone; the play was originally ruled incomplete, but after discussion amongst the officials, they called a force-out on Conrad Hamilton—making his first appearance of the season due to a nagging knee injury—declaring it a touchdown.

Leading 10–0, St. Louis crossed midfield again on a 16-yard catch-and-run by Faulk on 3rd-and-15, but a pair of penalties—including a personal foul on left tackle Orlando Pace that got him ejected from the game—led to a punt. Approaching halftime, the score remained how it was due mainly to dropped passes by St. Louis, as another drive into New York territory aided by a 30-yard pass to Ricky Proehl and a roughing the passer on Keith Hamilton eventually fizzled.

On the first drive of the third quarter, the Giants finally got a spark from Tiki Barber, who took a 3rd-and-10 pass from Kerry Collins for 11 hard-fought yards, ran for 30 on a pitch, and caught a great pass on the left sideline for 22 down to the 2. However, Collins tripped over Ron Stone as he dropped back three plays later, so they settled for a short Cary Blanchard field goal.

A 31-yard catch-and-run by Isaac Bruce put the Rams right back across midfield; four plays later, Warner hit a slant pass to Holt into the red zone, but the ball was stripped out by Jeremy Lincoln and recovered by Ellsworth. However, on 3rd-and-11, a miscommunication between Collins and Ike Hilliard resulted in an interception by safety Devin Bush, who took it back 45 yards for a touchdown, extending the Rams' lead to 17–3.

Collins answered by hitting Toomer and Hilliard for 14 and 12 yards, respectively, and Greg Comella—starting for the injured Charles Way—on fourth down, absorbing a big hit in the process. But after a sack by defensive end Grant Wistrom, the Giants tried a 42-yard field goal at the start of the fourth, which Blanchard missed wide right.

Two plays later, Hakim made them pay as he took a short pass over the middle from Warner, got around Jessie Armstead, faked out cornerback Emmanuel McDaniel, and accelerated past Ellsworth down the right sideline for a 65-yard touchdown.

Now needing three touchdowns, New York was forced to punt after crossing midfield; the defense responded by forcing a Rams punt, but on the next play from scrimmage, Collins was intercepted by linebacker Mike Jones, who ran it back for another score to make it 31–3 with just over seven minutes left in the game. A 32-yard pass interference on rookie defensive back Dré Bly led to a late Hilliard touchdown to make the outcome slightly more presentable, but it had been a mostly one-sided affair.

Faulk amassed 165 yards from scrimmage as the Rams clinched home-field advantage throughout the playoffs, continuing a remarkable turnaround after nine straight losing seasons. The Giants, meanwhile, dropped to 7–7, stuck in a four-way tie with the Cowboys, Packers and Panthers for the third wild card spot in the NFC, although Toomer's 162-yard day made him the first Giant to have 1,000 receiving yards in a season since Lionel Manuel in 1988.

==== Week 16: vs. Minnesota Vikings ====
Week 16: Minnesota Vikings at New York Giants – Game summary

Quarter	1	2	3	4	Total
**Vikings**	0	14	7	13	**34**
Giants	3	3	3	8	**17**

at Giants Stadium, East Rutherford, New Jersey

- Date: December 26
- Game time: 1:00 p.m. EST
- Game weather: Partly cloudy, 32 °F (0 °C)
- Game attendance: 78,095
- Referee: Johnny Grier
- TV announcers (Fox): Sam Rosen, Bill Maas and Mike Crispino

Game information

**First quarter**

- NYG – Cary Blanchard 24-yard field goal, 5:14. Giants 3–0. **Drive: 15 plays, 65 yards, 8:35.**

**Second quarter**

- MIN – Leroy Hoard 3-yard run (Gary Anderson kick), 11:59. Vikings 7–3. **Drive: 6 plays, 83 yards, 2:48.**
- NYG – Cary Blanchard 43-yard field goal, 7:50. Vikings 7–6. **Drive: 8 plays, 43 yards, 4:09.**
- MIN – Leroy Hoard 1-yard run (Gary Anderson kick), 0:27. Vikings 14–6. **Drive: 8 plays, 67 yards, 3:42.**

**Third quarter**

- MIN – Cris Carter 27-yard pass from Randy Moss (Gary Anderson kick), 4:29. Vikings 21–6. **Drive: 1 play, 27 yards, 0:08.**
- NYG – Cary Blanchard 42-yard field goal, 0:00. Vikings 21–9. **Drive: 11 plays, 50 yards, 4:29.**

**Fourth quarter**

- MIN – Moe Williams 85-yard kickoff return (Gary Anderson kick), 14:44. Giants 28–9.
- NYG – Pete Mitchell 1-yard pass from Kerry Collins (Kerry Collins run), 7:45. Vikings 28–17. **Drive: 16 plays, 69 yards, 6:59.**
- MIN – Robert Smith 70-yard run (pass failed), 7:23. Vikings 34–17. **Drive: 1 play, 70 yards, 0:22.**

**Top passers**

- MIN – Jeff George – 10/21, 185 yards, 2 INT
- NYG – Kerry Collins – 31/51, 297 yards, TD, INT

**Top rushers**

- MIN – Robert Smith – 16 rushes, 146 yards, TD
- NYG – Joe Montgomery – 19 rushes, 55 yards

**Top receivers**

- MIN – Cris Carter – 5 receptions, 131 yards, TD
- NYG – Amani Toomer – 9 receptions, 99 yards

Needing a win over the surging Vikings to keep control of their wild card playoff destiny, the Giants came out flat in their home finale, falling 34–17 despite holding a significant time of possession advantage (37:35-22:25), due to timely Minnesota big plays.

New York's first drive was a 15-play march that saw Joe Montgomery carry nine times for 37 yards, while Kerry Collins found Amani Toomer twice for 20; but on third down from the 5-yard line, Collins was sacked by John Randle, so they took a 24-yard Cary Blanchard field goal. Quarterback Jeff George completed three straight passes to put Minnesota into Giants territory, but a sack by Keith Hamilton forced them to punt.

However, on their first series of the second quarter, George hit a deep pass to Cris Carter over Conrad Hamilton for 37 yards; then he found Randy Moss open for 25 and Carter for 17 down to the 3, where running back Leroy Hoard pounded in for a touchdown. On the ensuing drive, a 25-yard pass interference on defensive back Robert Tate put the Giants at Minnesota's 26, but another sack—this one by defensive end Duane Clemons—led to another Blanchard field goal.

A 34-yard completion to Carter helped put the Vikings into the red zone midway through the period; but George's shot to the end zone was intercepted by Jeremy Lincoln. However, New York went three-and-out, and Minnesota handed off to running back Robert Smith four times for 41 yards before spelling him with Hoard, who scored from the 1 in the final minute of the first half.

The Giants mounted another sustained drive at the start of the third quarter, as Collins completed passes to Toomer, Pete Mitchell and Joe Jurevicius, putting them in the red zone; but on 3rd-and-1, Collins was sacked again by Randle, and Blanchard missed wide right from 39 yards out. The defense forced a punt, but on the next play, Collins forced a pass to Toomer, and it was tipped and intercepted by safety Anthony Bass, who returned it to New York's 27. One play later, George handed a reverse to Moss, who threw a perfect pass to Carter for a touchdown, putting the Vikings up 21–6.

Again New York came out with a slow, methodical drive, as Collins found Jurevicius, Toomer and Tiki Barber for first downs; but again they stalled out well short of the goal line, so again they took a field goal, which Blanchard converted from 42 yards on the last play of the period. Moe Williams answered by taking the ensuing kickoff 85 yards for a touchdown, with Antonio Banks dealing a critical crushing block on Blanchard.

Trailing 28–9, Collins led another agonizingly deliberate march, completing 9-of-13 passes, mostly to Barber and Ike Hilliard. Montgomery was stopped short twice from inside the 2 before Collins finally got the Giants in the end zone on a fourth-down pass to Mitchell; a two-point conversion by Montgomery made the score 28–17 midway through the period.

But on the next play from scrimmage, Smith bounced off a couple initial tackles, and then broke away down the left sideline for a 70-yard touchdown sprint, easily shaking off a Lincoln push-out attempt in the process. The Vikings failed to score on a botched extra point attempt, but it was academic, as New York's last scoring threat died just beyond midfield.

The victory clinched Minnesota's seventh postseason berth in eight years, while the Giants—despite the loss—were still mathematically alive in the playoff hunt thanks to losses by the Cowboys, Packers and Panthers, although the complex tiebreakers were not in their favor.

==== Week 17: at Dallas Cowboys ====
Week 17: New York Giants at Dallas Cowboys – Game summary

Quarter	1	2	3	4	Total
Giants	0	0	3	15	**18**
**Cowboys**	6	10	7	3	**26**

at Texas Stadium, Irving, Texas

- Date: January 2
- Game time: 4:05 p.m. EST/3:05 p.m. CST
- Game weather: Mostly cloudy, 70 °F (21 °C)
- Game attendance: 63,767
- Referee: Ron Blum
- TV announcers (Fox): Dick Stockton, Matt Millen and Pam Oliver

Game information

**First quarter**

- DAL – Eddie Murray 20-yard field goal, 12:42. Cowboys 3–0. **Drive: 4 plays, 2 yards, 2:18.**
- DAL – Eddie Murray 21-yard field goal, 1:03. Cowboys 6–0. **Drive: 13 plays, 76 yards, 6:15.**

**Second quarter**

- DAL – Raghib Ismail 4-yard pass from Troy Aikman (Eddie Murray kick), 6:35. Cowboys 13–0. **Drive: 9 plays, 80 yards, 4:47.**
- DAL – Eddie Murray 27-yard field goal, 0:25. Cowboys 16–0. **Drive: 10 plays, 78 yards, 1:25.**

**Third quarter**

- NYG – Cary Blanchard 29-yard field goal, 5:24. Cowboys 16–3. **Drive: 11 plays, 64 yards, 6:20.**
- DAL – Jason Tucker 90-yard pass from Troy Aikman (Eddie Murray kick), 4:14. Cowboys 23–3. **Drive: 2 plays, 86 yards, 1:10.**

**Fourth quarter**

- NYG – Joe Montgomery 1-yard run (Cary Blanchard kick), 10:19. Cowboys 23–10. **Drive: 4 plays, 80 yards, 0:55.**
- DAL – Eddie Murray 40-yard field goal, 4:09. Cowboys 26–10. **Drive: 11 plays, 57 yards, 6:10.**
- NYG – Brian Alford 7-yard pass from Kerry Collins (Joe Montgomery run), 0:57. Cowboys 26–18. **Drive: 13 plays, 80 yards, 3:12.**

**Top passers**

- NYG – Kerry Collins – 30/47, 316 yards, TD, INT
- DAL – Troy Aikman – 23/32, 288 yards, 2 TD

**Top rushers**

- NYG – Joe Montgomery – 12 rushes, 36 yards, TD
- DAL – Emmitt Smith – 22 rushes, 122 yards

**Top receivers**

- NYG – Tiki Barber – 13 receptions, 100 yards
- DAL – Jason Tucker – 4 receptions, 122 yards, TD

The Giants' best playoff chance going into Week 17 required a Packers loss in an early game and a win over the Cowboys in a later game. But when the Packers defeated the Cardinals 49–24, it all but ended New York's hopes, as they now rested on a tiebreaker of best net points in conference games with the Packers and Panthers, which meant they would have to win by 81 points. Instead, they fell behind 16–0 in the first half and had a comeback fall short in a 26–18 loss, ending their tumultuous season at 7–9.

Dallas started with a 79-yard return of the opening kickoff by Jason Tucker, coupled with a facemask penalty on David Patten to put the ball at the 5-yard line; but the defense held them to a short Eddie Murray field goal, and Kerry Collins came out with a collection of short passes to Tiki Barber and Greg Comella. However, a sure third-down tackle by linebacker Dexter Coakley kept New York out of field goal range and forced a punt. Troy Aikman then completed five passes to five different receivers for 64 yards, leading to another Murray field goal late in the first quarter.

A 26-yard pass to Comella and a third-down pickup by Ike Hilliard took the Giants to the Cowboys' 38, but a pair of holding penalties on Roman Oben—giving him an NFL-high eight on the season—spoiled the drive. Then Smith—who only rushed for 26 yards in their first meeting—broke out for a 45-yard gain, with only an ankle tackle by Percy Ellsworth saving a touchdown; but it just delayed the inevitable, as Aikman found Rocket Ismail for a score three plays later.

Collins hit Barber for 22 yards on the ensuing drive, and Joe Montgomery picked up a first down on 4th-and-inches, but New York again was stopped outside field goal range. With less than two minutes to go in the first half, Aikman handed off to Chris Warren for 25 yards and then completed four straight passes, including a 22-yard play to wide receiver Jeff Ogden; however, Tucker dropped a sure touchdown on the next play, so Murray came on for his third chip shot field goal.

On New York's second possession of the third quarter, Collins hit Amani Toomer for a 25-yard gain, and a 29-yard run by Sean Bennett led to a 29-yard Cary Blanchard field goal. But their momentum quickly vanished as just two plays later, Aikman hit a slant to Tucker, who slipped away from a Jeremy Lincoln tackle and easily sprinted 90 yards for a touchdown, extending Dallas's lead to 23–3.

The Giants' next promising drive ended when Collins was sacked on third down by defensive end Leon Lett, and the Cowboys ran time into the fourth quarter with passes by Aikman and runs by Smith. But after the defense forced a punt, Collins hit Joe Jurevicius for a 71-yard catch-and-run all the way down to the 1-yard line before Deion Sanders caught up to him; Montgomery scored on the next play, cutting their deficit to 23–10 with just over 10 minutes remaining.

Taking over at their own 20, the Cowboys handed the ball to Smith eight times for 39 yards on a six-minute drive that saw them continue to neutralize New York's defensive line. A 40-yard Murray field goal extended their lead to 26–10.

Needing two touchdowns and two two-point conversions, Collins came out with a fourth-down completion to Patten, and then hit passes to Jurevicius, Hilliard and Barber, also getting 15 yards on an unnecessary roughness on Singor Mobley against Toomer, as the Giants neared the red zone at the two-minute warning. A 15-yard pass to Hilliard got them down to the 7, and Collins's next pass was caught in the right corner of the end zone by wide receiver Brian Alford for a touchdown, his only catch of the season. Montgomery got the conversion after a replay review, making it 26–18 with 57 seconds left; but Blanchard's onside kick was recovered by Coakley, sealing the outcome and a Cowboys playoff berth.

The loss gave New York their first losing season since 1996; however, offensive bright spots came in the form of Toomer, who broke Earnest Gray's single-season franchise record of 78 receptions in 1983, and Barber, whose 13 receptions broke Mark Bavaro's franchise record for receptions in one game, while Hilliard finished his campaign with 996 yards, making him four shy of giving New York their first 1,000-yard receiving tandem with Toomer. But despite a few positives, the Giants entered the off-season in an uncertain state after finishing the year losing six of their last eight games.

=== Standings ===
NFC East
	W	L	T	PCT	PF	PA	STK
^{(3)} Washington Redskins	10	6	0	.625	443	377	W2
^{(5)} Dallas Cowboys	8	8	0	.500	352	276	W1
New York Giants	7	9	0	.438	299	358	L3
Arizona Cardinals	6	10	0	.375	245	382	L4
Philadelphia Eagles	5	11	0	.313	272	357	W2

== See also ==
- List of New York Giants seasons
