= 1994 United States House of Representatives elections in South Carolina =

- November 8, 1994

All 6 South Carolina seats to the United States House of Representatives
	Majority party	Minority party
Party	Republican	Democratic
Last election	3	3
Seats won	4	2
Seat change	▲1	▼1
Popular vote	552,085	313,043
Percentage	63.63%	36.08%
Swing	▲11.53%	▼9.27%

Republican
50–60%
60–70%
70–80%
80–90%
>90%
Democratic
50–60%
60–70%
Winners
Republican hold
Republican gain
Democratic hold

The 1994 United States House of Representatives elections in South Carolina were held on November 8, 1994, to select six representatives for two-year terms from the state of South Carolina. The primary elections for the Democrats and the Republicans were held on August 9, and the runoff elections were held two weeks later, on August 23. All four incumbents who ran were re-elected, and the Republicans won both of the open seats in the 1st congressional district and the 3rd congressional district. The composition of the state delegation after the elections was four Republicans and two Democrats.

== 1st congressional district ==
Incumbent Republican Congressman Arthur Ravenel, Jr. of the 1st congressional district, in office since 1987, chose to run for governor instead of re-election. Mark Sanford, a real estate developer from Sullivan's Island, won the Republican primary and defeated Democrat Robert Barber in the general election.

=== Republican primary ===
Republican primary
Candidate	Votes	%
Van Hipp, Jr.	17,066	30.8
Mark Sanford	10,568	19.0
Mike Rose	9,424	17.0
Bob Harrell	9,419	17.0
L. Mendel Rivers, Jr.	6,604	11.9
Sarah Lee King	1,849	3.3
John Henry Whitmire	543	1.0

Republican primary runoff
Candidate	Votes	%	±%
Mark Sanford	30,304	52.0	+33.0
Van Hipp, Jr.	27,921	48.0	+17.2

=== General election results ===
South Carolina's 1st congressional district election results, 1994
Party	Candidate	Votes	%	±%
Republican	Mark Sanford	97,803	66.3	+0.2
Democratic	Robert Barber	47,769	32.4	−0.1
Libertarian	Robert Payne	1,836	1.3	+1.3
No party	Write-ins	63	0.0	0.0
Majority		50,034	33.9	+0.3
Turnout		147,471		
Republican hold				

== 2nd congressional district ==
Incumbent Republican Congressman Floyd Spence of the 2nd congressional district, in office since 1971, was unopposed in his bid for re-election.

=== General election results ===
South Carolina's 2nd congressional district election results, 1994
Party	Candidate	Votes	%	±%
Republican	Floyd Spence (incumbent)	133,307	99.8	+12.2
No party	Write-ins	285	0.2	+0.1
Majority		133,022	99.6	+24.3
Turnout		133,592		
Republican hold				

== 3rd congressional district ==
Incumbent Democratic Congressman Butler Derrick of the 3rd congressional district, in office since 1975, opted to retire. Lindsey Graham, a state representative from Oconee County, won the Republican primary and defeated Democrat James E. Bryan, Jr. in the general election.

=== Democratic primary ===
Democratic primary
Candidate	Votes	%
James E. Bryan, Jr.	12,034	34.3
Tommy Moore	11,031	31.4
Debbie Dorn Pracht	10,744	30.6
Lou Bracknell	1,304	3.7

Democratic primary runoff
Candidate	Votes	%	±%
James E. Bryan, Jr.	15,464	51.8	+17.5
Tommy Moore	14,391	48.2	+16.8

=== Republican primary ===
Republican primary
Candidate	Votes	%
Lindsey Graham	21,562	52.1
Bob Cantrell	13,609	32.9
Ed Allgood	6,235	15.0

=== General election results ===
South Carolina's 3rd congressional district election results, 1994
Party	Candidate	Votes	%	±%
Republican	Lindsey Graham	90,123	60.1	+21.3
Democratic	James E. Bryan, Jr.	59,932	39.9	−21.2
No party	Write-ins	13	0.0	−0.1
Majority		30,191	20.2	−2.1
Turnout		150,068		
Republican gain from Democratic				

== 4th congressional district ==
Incumbent Republican Congressman Bob Inglis of the 4th congressional district, in office since 1993, defeated Democratic challenger Jerry L. Fowler.

=== General election results ===
South Carolina's 4th congressional district election results, 1994
Party	Candidate	Votes	%	±%
Republican	Bob Inglis (incumbent)	109,626	73.5	+23.2
Democratic	Jerry L. Fowler	39,396	26.4	−21.1
No party	Write-ins	154	0.1	+0.1
Majority		70,230	47.1	+44.3
Turnout		149,176		
Republican hold				

== 5th congressional district ==
Incumbent Democratic Congressman John M. Spratt, Jr. of the 5th congressional district, in office since 1983, defeated Republican challenger Larry Bigham.

=== General election results ===
South Carolina's 5th congressional district election results, 1994
Party	Candidate	Votes	%	±%
Democratic	John M. Spratt, Jr. (incumbent)	77,311	52.1	−9.1
Republican	Larry Bigham	70,967	47.8	+9.1
No party	Write-ins	85	0.1	0.0
Majority		6,344	4.3	−18.2
Turnout		148,363		
Democratic hold				

== 6th congressional district ==
Incumbent Democratic Congressman Jim Clyburn of the 6th congressional district, in office since 1993, defeated Republican challenger Gary McLeod.

=== Democratic primary ===
Democratic primary
Candidate	Votes	%
Jim Clyburn	50,476	85.7
Ben Frasier	8,419	14.3

=== General election results ===
South Carolina's 6th congressional district election results, 1994
Party	Candidate	Votes	%	±%
Democratic	Jim Clyburn (incumbent)	88,635	63.8	−1.5
Republican	Gary McLeod	50,259	36.2	+1.5
No party	Write-ins	29	0.0	0.0
Majority		38,376	27.6	−3.0
Turnout		138,923		
Democratic hold				

== See also ==
- 1994 United States House of Representatives elections
- 1994 South Carolina gubernatorial election
- South Carolina's congressional districts
