= Sean Bennett =

Sean Bennett may refer to:

- Sean Bennett (gridiron football) (born 1975), American football player
- Sean Bennett (cyclist) (born 1996), American cyclist
- Sean Bennett (politician) (born 1968), American politician
