= Cedric Jones =

Cedric Jones may refer to two American football players:

- Cedric Jones (defensive end) (born 1974), a former defensive end for the New York Giants
- Cedric Jones (wide receiver) (born (1960), a former wide receiver for the New England Patriots
