= Christian Peter =

American football player (born 1972)

No. 99, 97
- Position: Defensive tackle

Personal information
- Born: October 5, 1972 (age 54); Locust, New Jersey, U.S.
- Listed height: 6 ft 3 in (1.91 m)
- Listed weight: 295 lb (134 kg)

Career information
- High school: Middletown South (Middletown Township, New Jersey); Milford Academy
- College: Nebraska
- NFL draft: 1996: 5th round, 149th overall pick

Career history
- New England Patriots (1996)*; New York Giants (1997–2000); Indianapolis Colts (2001); Chicago Bears (2002)
- * Offseason or practice squad member only

Awards and highlights
- 2× National champion (1994, 1995); First-team All-Big Eight (1995)

Career NFL statistics
- Tackles: 149
- Sacks: 3.5
- Fumble recoveries: 1
- Stats at Pro Football Reference

Christian J. Peter (born October 5, 1972) is an American former professional football player who was a defensive tackle in the National Football League (NFL). He played college football for the Nebraska Cornhuskers. Peter's younger brother, Jason, also played in the NFL.

== Early life ==
Peter grew up the oldest of four children in the Locust section of Middletown Township, New Jersey. He attended Middletown High School South, where he played one year of football as a junior. The team went undefeated and won the state title in 1990.

== College career ==
Peter received a full athletic scholarship to the University of Nebraska–Lincoln, where he was a three-year starter. He became one of the leaders of Nebraska's feared "Blackshirt" defense. Peter was an all-Big Eight Conference and honorable mention All-American in his senior year, and finished his college career with 124 total tackles, 20 tackles for loss and nine sacks. He was inducted into the Nebraska Football Hall of Fame in 2006.

== Arrests and convictions ==
While attending Nebraska, Peter had several run-ins with the law for various offenses such as threatening a parking attendant while his vehicle was being towed, trespassing, public urination, refusing to comply with police, minor in possession of alcohol, and failure to appear in court. He was convicted four times. [3][4]

In 1993 Peter was accused of groping Natalie Kuijvenhoven (a former Miss Nebraska) in a crowded bar. He pled guilty and was sentenced to 18 months probation, and was suspended for a 1993 exhibition game. Following the 1993 charges from Kuijvenhoven, Kathy Redmond, who attended the University of Nebraska with Peter, came forward and claimed that Peter had sexually assaulted her during their freshman year in 1991. No criminal charges were filed in the matter, but Redmond did file a Title IX suit against the University of Nebraska in 1995; the suit was settled out of court.

In 1994, only a month before the draft, Peter was convicted of disturbing the peace after a woman accused him of grabbing her throat in a Kearney, Nebraska bar. He said he was under the influence during the altercation and admitted to responding in an inexcusable way after she allegedly called him a rapist.

== Professional career ==
Peter was selected by the New England Patriots in the fifth round of the 1996 NFL draft. The pick set off a firestorm of criticism from the Boston area press, including Patriots fans and women's groups, as well as Myra Kraft, wife of Patriots owner Robert Kraft.[3] After learning more about Peter's history, the Patriots renounced his rights only a week after the draft. The team said that Peter's behavior was "incompatible with our organization's standards of acceptable conduct."[6] According to The Boston Globe, Myra Kraft personally demanded that the Patriots cut ties with Peter.[3] It was the first time in NFL history that a drafted player had been waived by a team before the start of training camp. Partly due to the backlash, no other team expressed interest. Since then, the Patriots have adopted a zero-tolerance policy for sexual assault.

After the 1996 season, the New York Giants signed Peter as a free agent on condition that he go through counseling for substance abuse, attention deficit disorder, and anger management.[7] He apologized for his behavior while at Nebraska and still speaks about the Giants today as having saved his life. After four years with the Giants, he went on to play with the Indianapolis Colts and the Chicago Bears, where he retired in 2004.

== NFL career statistics ==
Legend
**Bold**	Career high

=== Regular season ===
Year	Team	Games		Tackles				Interceptions				Fumbles			
Year	Team	GP	GS	Comb	Solo	Ast	Sck	Int	Yds	TD	Lng	FF	FR	Yds	TD
1997	NYG	7	0	2	1	1	0.5	0	0	0	0	0	0	0	0
1998	NYG	16	6	32	22	10	**1.0**	0	0	0	0	**1**	0	0	0
1999	NYG	16	10	26	19	7	0.0	0	0	0	0	0	**1**	**38**	**1**
2000	NYG	16	15	**40**	**26**	**14**	**1.0**	0	0	0	0	0	0	0	0
2001	IND	14	0	16	10	6	**1.0**	0	0	0	0	0	0	0	0
2002	CHI	12	3	33	25	8	0.0	0	0	0	0	0	0	0	0
		81	34	149	103	46	3.5	0	0	0	0	1	1	38	1

=== Playoffs ===
Year	Team	Games		Tackles				Interceptions				Fumbles			
Year	Team	GP	GS	Comb	Solo	Ast	Sck	Int	Yds	TD	Lng	FF	FR	Yds	TD
2000	NYG	3	2	3	3	0	0.0	0	0	0	0	0	0	0	0
		3	2	3	3	0	0.0	0	0	0	0	0	0	0	0

== Post-playing career ==
Today, Peter speaks openly of his sobriety, past struggles, and those who have helped him along the way. He travels to schools, businesses, communities, rehabs, and correctional facilities sharing his story in hopes that someone struggling will be helped. Peter currently serves on the board of the Tigger House Foundation, a 501(c) (3) non-profit organization dedicated to achieving a positive impact by reducing the death rate of heroin and opiate addiction.

Peter is currently residing in his home state of New Jersey with his wife and three children. In 2007, he started The Competitive Advantage Companies, a full service insurance brokerage firm based out of Red Bank, NJ.
