= Pete Mitchell (American football) =

American football player (born 1971)

No. 83
- Position: Tight end

Personal information
- Born: October 9, 1971 (age 55); Royal Oak, Michigan, U.S.
- Listed height: 6 ft 2 in (1.88 m)
- Listed weight: 243 lb (110 kg)

Career information
- High school: Birmingham Brother Rice (Birmingham, Michigan)
- College: Boston College
- NFL draft: 1995: 4th round, 122nd overall pick

Career history
- Miami Dolphins (1995)*; Jacksonville Jaguars (1995–1998); New York Giants (1999–2000); Detroit Lions (2001); Jacksonville Jaguars (2002); Indianapolis Colts (2003)
- * Offseason or practice squad member only

Awards and highlights
- 2× First-team All-American (1993, 1994); Boston College Eagles Jersey No. 82 retired

Career NFL statistics
- Receptions: 279
- Receiving yards: 2,885
- Receiving touchdowns: 15
- Stats at Pro Football Reference

Peter Clark Mitchell (born October 9, 1971) is an American former professional football player who was a tight end in the National Football League (NFL) for nine seasons. He played college football for the Boston College Eagles, and was a two-time All-American. He played professionally for the Jacksonville Jaguars, New York Giants and Detroit Lions of the NFL.

== Early life ==
Mitchell was born in Royal Oak, Michigan. He is a graduate of Birmingham Brother Rice High School in Birmingham, Michigan, where he played for the Rice Warriors high school football team.

== College career ==
Mitchell accepted an athletic scholarship to attend Boston College, where he played for the Eagles from 1991 to 1994. He earned first-team All-American honors as a junior in 1993; as a senior in 1994, he was recognized as a consensus first-team All-American, having been a first-team selection of the Associated Press, the Walter Camp Foundation, Football Writers Association of America, Scripps-Howard, and The Sporting News.

- 1991: 29 catches for 398 yards and 3 touchdowns
- 1992: 40 catches for 555 yards and 3 touchdowns
- 1993: 66 catches for 818 yards and 7 touchdowns
- 1994: 55 catches for 617 yards and 7 touchdowns

== Professional career ==
The Miami Dolphins selected Mitchell in the fourth round (122nd overall pick) of the 1995 NFL draft, but traded him during training camp to the Jacksonville Jaguars in exchange for wide receiver Mike Williams. Mitchell played for the Jaguars from 1995 to 1998. In his first four seasons for the Jags, he became the team's regular starter at tight end. From 2000 to 2001, he played for the New York Giants, and had one of his best years statistically in 1999 as a part-time starter, when he caught 58 receptions for 520 yards. He played for the Detroit Lions in 2001, but saw action in only five games and started only once in the Lions' offense. He returned to the Jaguars in 2002, and started 11 of 16 regular season games. In a nine-season NFL career, Mitchell played in 114 regular season games, started 63 of them, and compiled 279 receptions for 2,885 yards and 15 touchdowns.

== NFL career statistics ==
Legend
**Bold**	Career high

=== Regular season ===
Year	Team	Games		Receiving				
Year	Team	GP	GS	Rec	Yds	Avg	Lng	TD
1995	JAX	16	5	41	527	**12.9**	35	2
1996	JAX	16	7	52	**575**	11.1	30	1
1997	JAX	16	12	35	380	10.9	33	**4**
1998	JAX	16	16	38	363	9.6	38	2
1999	NYG	15	6	**58**	520	9.0	25	3
2000	NYG	14	5	25	245	9.8	22	1
2001	DET	5	1	5	29	5.8	12	0
2002	JAX	16	11	25	246	9.8	**45**	2
Career		114	63	279	2,885	10.3	45	15

=== Playoffs ===
Year	Team	Games		Receiving				
Year	Team	GP	GS	Rec	Yds	Avg	Lng	TD
1996	JAX	3	2	**12**	**136**	11.3	**47**	0
1997	JAX	1	1	1	7	7.0	7	0
1998	JAX	2	2	3	35	11.7	22	0
2000	NYG	3	2	3	54	**18.0**	33	0
Career		9	7	19	232	12.2	47	0
