= Cedric Jones (defensive end) =

American football player (born 1974)

No. 94
- Position: Defensive end

Personal information
- Born: April 30, 1974 (age 52); Houston, Texas, U.S.
- Listed height: 6 ft 4 in (1.93 m)
- Listed weight: 275 lb (125 kg)

Career information
- High school: Lamar (Houston, Texas)
- College: Oklahoma
- NFL draft: 1996: 1st round, 5th overall pick

Career history
- New York Giants (1996–2000); St. Louis Rams (2001)

Awards and highlights
- First-team All-American (1995); 2× First-team All-Big Eight (1994, 1995)

Career NFL statistics
- Tackles: 151
- Sacks: 15
- Forced fumbles: 7
- Pass deflections: 7
- Stats at Pro Football Reference

Cedric Lewis Jones (born April 30, 1974) is an American former professional football player who was a defensive end in the National Football League (NFL) for the New York Giants, who played in Super Bowl XXXV. He played college football at the University of Oklahoma and was selected in the first round (fifth overall) of the 1996 NFL draft.

He signed with the St. Louis Rams in 2001, but he was injured in August and did not play.

== NFL career statistics ==
Legend
	Led the league
**Bold**	Career high

=== Regular season ===
Year	Team	Games		Tackles				Interceptions				Fumbles			
Year	Team	GP	GS	Comb	Solo	Ast	Sck	Int	Yds	TD	Lng	FF	FR	Yds	TD
1996	NYG	16	0	12	6	6	0.0	0	0	0	0	0	0	0	0
1997	NYG	9	2	9	9	0	0.0	0	0	0	0	0	0	0	0
1998	NYG	16	1	17	13	4	4.0	0	0	0	0	2	**1**	0	0
1999	NYG	16	16	**60**	**43**	**17**	**7.5**	0	0	0	0	**5**	0	0	0
2000	NYG	16	16	53	40	13	3.5	0	0	0	0	0	0	0	0
		73	35	151	111	40	15.0	0	0	0	0	7	1	0	0

=== Playoffs ===
Year	Team	Games		Tackles				Interceptions				Fumbles			
Year	Team	GP	GS	Comb	Solo	Ast	Sck	Int	Yds	TD	Lng	FF	FR	Yds	TD
2000	NYG	3	3	3	1	2	0.0	0	0	0	0	0	1	0	0
		3	3	3	1	2	0.0	0	0	0	0	0	1	0	0
