= Roman Oben =

American football player (born 1972)

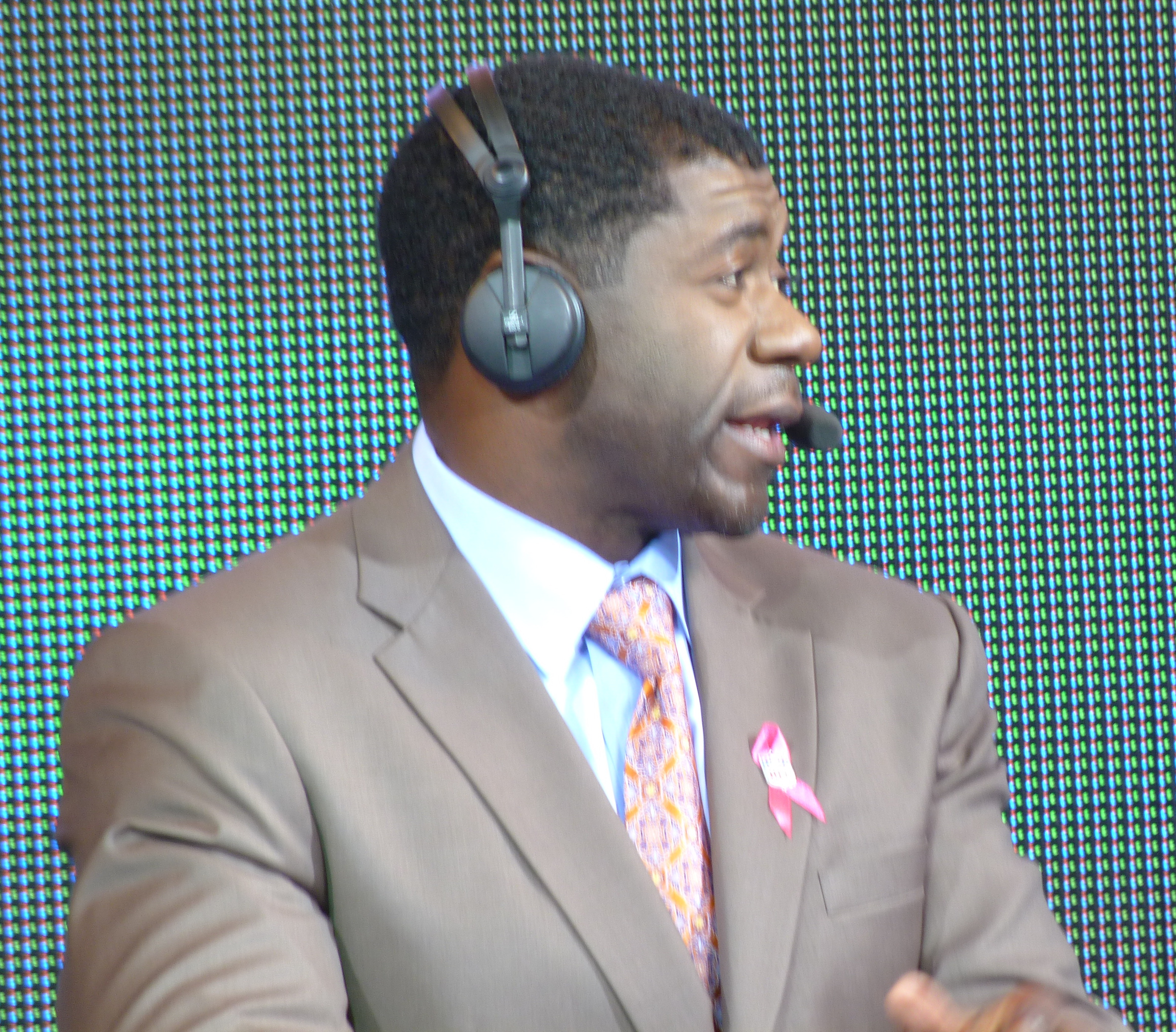
- Oben at the Giants Post-Game Show in 2012

No. 72
- Position: Offensive tackle

Personal information
- Born: 9 October 1972 (age 54); Yaounde, Cameroon
- Listed height: 6 ft 4 in (1.93 m)
- Listed weight: 305 lb (138 kg)

Career information
- High school: Gonzaga College High School (Washington, D.C., U.S.); Fork Union Military Academy (Fork Union, Virginia, U.S.)
- College: Louisville
- NFL draft: 1996: 3rd round, 66th overall pick

Career history

Playing
- New York Giants (1996–1999); Cleveland Browns (2000–2001); Tampa Bay Buccaneers (2002–2003); San Diego Chargers (2004–2007)

Operations
- National Football League (2014–2015) Director, Player Health & Safety; National Football League (2016) Senior Director, Youth Football; National Football League (2017) Vice President, Youth & High School Football; National Football League (2019–2026) Vice President, Football Development; Southeastern Conference Associate Commissioner for Football - Present

Awards and highlights
- Super Bowl champion (XXXVII); Second-team All-American (1995); Louisville Cardinals Ring of Honor; Inducted into KY Pro Football HOF (2013)

Career NFL statistics
- Games played: 143
- Games started: 130
- Fumble recoveries: 4
- Stats at Pro Football Reference

Roman Oben (born 9 October 1972) is an American former professional football player in the National Football League (NFL). He played college football at the University of Louisville before being drafted by the New York Giants in 1996. Oben spent 12 years as an offensive tackle in the National Football League (NFL) playing for the Cleveland Browns, Tampa Bay Buccaneers and the San Diego Chargers. He was a starting offensive tackle on the Buccaneers Super Bowl XXXVII Championship team.

Oben is currently the Associate Commissioner for Football for the Southeastern Conference after previously serving as NFL Vice President of Football Development.

== Early life ==
At the age of four he moved with his mother from Cameroon to the United States and settled in Washington, D.C. He attended Gonzaga College High School and spent one year at Fork Union Military Academy where he set a FUMA discus record at 185 ft 10 in (56.64 m) that stood for 21 years (the record was broken in 2012).

== College career ==
A two-sport college athlete, Oben played college football at the University of Louisville, and was a four-year letterman in football and three-year letterman in track and field.

In football, he was an All-National Independent first team selection as a junior. In track and field, as a freshman in 1991, he placed at the Metro Conference Championship in the shot put.

While at the University of Louisville, Oben became a member of Alpha Phi Alpha fraternity and was Vice President of the Alpha Pi chapter of Alpha Phi Alpha.

== Professional career ==
Pre-draft measurables
Height	Weight	Arm length	Hand span	40-yard dash	10-yard split	20-yard split	20-yard shuttle	Vertical jump	Broad jump	Bench press
6 ft 4 1/8 in (1.93 m)	301 lb (137 kg)	36 in (0.91 m)	10 1/8 in (0.26 m)	5.07 s	1.79 s	3.04 s	4.95 s	29.0 in (0.74 m)	8 ft 11 in (2.72 m)	28 reps

Selected in the third round (66th overall) by the New York Giants in the 1996 NFL draft, Oben was the first Cameroonian-born NFL player drafted. Oben started in over 90% of the games in his 12-year career at left tackle. He played for the New York Giants (1996–99), Cleveland Browns (2000–01), Tampa Bay Buccaneers (2002–03), and San Diego Chargers (2004–07).

=== New York Giants ===
Oben spent four seasons (1996–99) as a member of the New York Giants where he started 48 of 50 games.

=== Cleveland Browns ===
Oben joined the Browns as an unrestricted free agent prior to the 2000 season and registered 29 starts at left tackle during his two-year tenure in Cleveland.

=== Tampa Bay Buccaneers ===
Oben was the starting left tackle for the Tampa Bay Buccaneers in their Super Bowl victory in 2002, leading an offensive line that allowed only one sack in 100 passing situations during the postseason, and earning a Super Bowl XXXVII championship ring in the process.

=== San Diego Chargers ===
In 2004, the Chargers traded a fifth-round pick in the 2005 NFL draft to the Buccaneers for Oben. The move was made with the pick obtained from the Giants in the Rivers-Manning trade. Oben quickly became a fixture at the left tackle position and after bouncing back from a career-threatening foot injury, he spent the 2007 season as a player-mentor on the Chargers' young offensive line.

=== Off the field ===
While serving as the National Football League Players Association (NFLPA) team representative for three teams over seven years, Oben was integral in drafting a resolution that ensures NFL Player Programs pay for continued education for retired players and as an active team representative. Oben was a charter member of the NFLPA Benefits Committee that ensured future medical coverage for all NFL players.

== Education ==
Oben earned a bachelor's degree in economics from the University of Louisville in 1995. He took graduate courses each NFL off-season towards a master's degree in public administration which he earned from Fairleigh Dickinson University in 2001 while playing for the Cleveland Browns.

== Ring of Fame honors ==
- University of Louisville Football Ring of Honor, 2006
- University of Louisville Athletic Hall of Fame, 2009
- Gonzaga College High School Athletic Hall of Fame, 2009
- Fork Union Military Academy Sports Hall of Fame, 2009
- Kentucky Pro Football Hall of Fame, 2013

== Awards ==
Oben has been honored for his work with Big Brothers Big Sisters of America in San Diego where he was recognized as the 2007 Man of the Year.

== After football career ==
After retiring from football in 2008, Oben worked in broadcast media as a football analyst, and held executive positions in sales and business development. He is now a Vice President in the Football Operations department at the National Football League.

== Personal ==
He has two sons who play college football, Andre Oben and RJ Oben, a former defensive end for Duke Blue Devils and the Notre Dame Fighting Irish.
