= Mike Rose (politician) =

American politician

Member of the South Carolina Senate from the 38th district
- In office 1989–2012
- Succeeded by: Sean Bennett

Personal details
- Born: October 13, 1947 (age 78)
- Party: Republican
- Education: United States Air Force Academy (B.A.); Harvard Business School (MBA); New York University School of Law (JD)

Mike Rose (born October 13, 1947) is an American politician. He was a member of the South Carolina Senate from the 38th District, serving from 1989 to 2012 He is a member of the Republican party.
