= Joe Montgomery =

American football player (born 1976)

No. 25, 33
- Position: Running back

Personal information
- Born: June 8, 1976 (age 50); Robbins, Illinois, U.S.
- Listed height: 5 ft 10 in (1.78 m)
- Listed weight: 230 lb (104 kg)

Career information
- High school: Richards (Oak Lawn, Illinois)
- College: Ohio State
- NFL draft: 1999: 2nd round, 49th overall pick

Career history
- New York Giants (1999–2001); Carolina Panthers (2002)
- Stats at Pro Football Reference

Joseph Montgomery Jr. (born June 8, 1976) is an American former professional football player who was a running back for three seasons in the National Football League (NFL) with the New York Giants and Carolina Panthers. He played college football for the Ohio State Buckeyes and was selected in the second round of the 1999 NFL draft with the 49th overall pick. As a rookie, he had 115 carries for 348 yards and three touchdowns in seven games in the 1999 season.
