= Corey Widmer =

American football player (born 1968)

No. 90
- Position: Linebacker

Personal information
- Born: December 25, 1968 (age 57); Alexandria, Virginia, U.S.
- Listed height: 6 ft 3 in (1.91 m)
- Listed weight: 256 lb (116 kg)

Career information
- High school: Bozeman (Bozeman, Montana)
- College: Montana State
- NFL draft: 1992: 7th round, 180th overall pick

Career history
- New York Giants (1992–1999)

Career NFL statistics
- Tackles: 385
- Sacks: 7.5
- Interceptions: 4
- Stats at Pro Football Reference

Corey Edward Widmer (born December 25, 1968) is an American former professional football player who was a linebacker for his entire eight-year career with the New York Giants of the National Football League (NFL). He played college football for the Montana State Bobcats in Bozeman, where he was also raised. He was selected by the Giants in the seventh round of the 1992 NFL draft.

In 2007, he suffered a severe back injury while paragliding in Chile.

== See also ==
- History of the New York Giants (1994-present)
