= L. Mendel Rivers Jr. =

American politician

Member of the South Carolina House of Representatives for Charleston County
- In office 1972–1974

Personal details
- Born: October 6, 1947 (age 78) Alexandria, Virginia
- Party: Democratic
- Occupation: lawyer

Lucius Mendel Rivers Jr. (born October 6, 1947) is an American attorney and former politician in the state of South Carolina. He served in the South Carolina House of Representatives as a member of the Democratic Party from 1972 to 1974, representing Charleston County, South Carolina. The son of longtime South Carolina Congressman L. Mendel Rivers, born while his father was serving in Washington, D.C.; he is now a lawyer in Charleston. He attended Georgetown University.
