= O. J. Childress =

American football player (born 1976)

No. 57
- Position: Linebacker

Personal information
- Born: December 6, 1976 (age 49); Hermitage, Tennessee, U.S.
- Listed height: 6 ft 1 in (1.85 m)
- Listed weight: 244 lb (111 kg)

Career information
- High school: McGavock (Nashville, Tennessee)
- College: Clemson (1995–1998)
- NFL draft: 1999: 7th round, 231st overall pick

Career history
- New York Giants (1999–2000); → Amsterdam Admirals (2000); San Francisco 49ers (2000)*; Carolina Panthers (2000)
- * Offseason or practice squad member only
- Stats at Pro Football Reference

Orin J. Childress (born December 6, 1976) is an American former professional football linebacker who played one season with the New York Giants of the National Football League (NFL). He was selected by the Giants in the seventh round of the 1999 NFL draft. He played college football at Clemson University. Childress was also a member of the Amsterdam Admirals, San Francisco 49ers and Carolina Panthers.

== Early life ==
Orin J. Childress was born on December 6, 1976, in Hermitage, Tennessee. He attended McGavock High School in Nashville, Tennessee.

He was a four-year letterman for the Clemson Tigers of Clemson University from 1995 to 1998.

== Professional career ==
Childress was rated the 16th best outside linebacker in the 1999 NFL draft by NFLDraftScout.com. He was selected by the New York Giants with the 231st pick in the draft. He appeared in four games for the Giants during the 1999 season. He played for the Amsterdam Admirals during the 2000 NFL Europe season. He was released by the Giants on August 28, 2000 and signed to the team's practice squad on August 31, 2000. He was released by the Giants on November 17, 2000.

Childress was signed off waivers by the San Francisco 49ers on November 20, 2000. Childress was signed off the 49ers' practice squad by the Carolina Panthers on December 15, 2000. He was released by the Panthers on August 31, 2001.
