= Sean Bennett (gridiron football) =

American gridiron football player (born 1975)

No. 20
- Positions: Running back, fullback

Personal information
- Born: November 9, 1975 (age 51); Evansville, Indiana, U.S.
- Listed height: 6 ft 1 in (1.85 m)
- Listed weight: 230 lb (104 kg)

Career information
- College: Northwestern
- NFL draft: 1999: 4th round, 112th overall pick

Career history
- New York Giants (1999–2000); (2002); New York Jets (2003)*; Ottawa Renegades (2004–2005); Evansville BlueCats (2004–2006); Toronto Argonauts (2006)
- * Offseason or practice squad member only

Career NFL statistics
- Rushing attempts: 29
- Rushing yards: 126
- Rushing TDs: 1
- Receptions: 9
- Receiving yards: 164
- Receiving TDs: 0
- Stats at Pro Football Reference

William Sean Bennett (born November 9, 1975) is an American former professional football player who was a running back in the National Football League and Canadian Football League (CFL). He was selected by the New York Giants in the fourth round of the 1999 NFL draft. He played college football for the Evansville Purple Aces, Illinois Fighting Illini and Northwestern Wildcats.

Bennett began his collegiate career as a baseball and football player at the University of Illinois Urbana-Champaign, but transferred to the University of Evansville after one year. At Evansville he was twice an All-American but had to transfer due to the school dropping football as a sport. Bennett then attended Northwestern University, where he was a fullback and was mainly a blocker but did get a few rushing attempts.

Since he was a senior after his single season at Northwestern, he elected to enter the NFL draft and surprised many by being selected by the New York Giants in the fourth round. He played four seasons in New York but ended up injured each season and was released after 2002. He then joined the New York Jets but was released before the season began. After his failed stints in New York he played for the CFL's Ottawa Renegades and Toronto Argonauts; and the Evansville BlueCats of the National Indoor Football League.

== Early career ==
Sean Bennett was born on November 9, 1975, in Evansville, Indiana. In high school, Bennett played baseball and football and was hoping to become a professional baseball player. In football, he played wide receiver and was named All–State and in baseball his batting average was .425 over four years.

Following his senior season in high school, Bennett accepted a baseball and football scholarship at the University of Illinois. However at the end of his freshman year he decided to drop baseball and transfer to the University of Evansville. When asked why he dropped baseball, Bennett responded, "I couldn't hit." At Evansville, his hometown, Bennett converted to running back after mainly playing wide receiver before that. As a sophomore and junior, he was a two-time All-American and set school records in rushing and touchdowns. However, after his junior season the school decided to drop football forcing Bennett to transfer to Northwestern University. At Northwestern, Bennett became the starting fullback. In his only year he had 32 rushes and 160 yards.

== Professional career ==
=== 1999–2003 ===
On March 10, 1999, when some National Football League (NFL) scouts came to work out D'Wayne Bates and Barry Gardner, Bennett decided to join the workout. When he ran the 40-yard dash in 4.45 seconds, scouts were reportedly, "doing double-takes".

Bennett was selected by the New York Giants in the fourth round of the 1999 NFL draft with the 112th overall pick. As a rookie in 1999, Bennett missed seven games due to a knee injury. After undergoing surgery on the knee, he missed all of the 2000 season. In 2001, New York expected Bennett to work in tandem with Tiki Barber but after suffering a hamstring injury, he was released on September 3, 2001. After multiple injuries to their running backs, the Giants became interested in re-signing Bennett but because of NFL rules they were unable to do so until January 2002. During this time period, he was offered contracts by the Philadelphia Eagles and Miami Dolphins but rejected both hoping to return to the Giants. He re-signed with the Giants on January 16, 2002. During the season, Bennett was returned to the wide receiver position he played in high school, due to multiple injuries suffered by the Giants players in that position. He was waived on December 4, 2002.

On April 1, 2003, the New York Jets signed Bennett. He was released on August 23, 2003.

=== 2004–2007 ===
Bennett signed with the Ottawa Renegades on March 3, 2004. He was cut at the end of training camp. On June 16, 2004, after he was cut he signed with the Evansville BlueCats of the National Indoor Football League. Bennett left the BlueCats and was re-signed to the Renegades practice roster. On July 27, he was activated and played in three games for Ottawa. In 2005, he played in five games recording 76 yards on four catches. With Ottawa, Bennett returned to playing fullback which he played at Northwestern. After the season, he re-joined Evansville for one season. After Ottawa folded at the end of 2005, he entered the CFL Dispersal Draft and was selected by the Toronto Argonauts. When he was drafted he was playing once again for the Evansville BlueCats, but left the team in favor of Toronto. During his only season in Toronto, Bennett suffered a finger injury that allowed him to play in only three games. The Argonauts won all three games Bennett played for them.

After leaving the game of football in 2007, Bennett became a trainer at Tri-State Athletic Club in Evansville.
