= 1998 New York Giants season =

NFL team season

- Owner: Wellington Mara; Robert Tisch
- General manager: Ernie Accorsi
- Head coach: Jim Fassel
- Home stadium: Giants Stadium

Results
- Record: 8–8
- Division place: 3rd NFC East
- Playoffs: Did not qualify
- Pro Bowlers: 2: DE Michael Strahan; LB Jessie Armstead

The 1998 New York Giants season was the team's 74th season in the National Football League (NFL) and second under head coach Jim Fassel. The team failed to improve upon their previous season's output of 10–5–1, winning only eight games and missing the playoffs.

One of their wins, however, came against the defending Super Bowl champion Denver Broncos in Week 15. Trailing by three late in the fourth quarter, Amani Toomer caught a deep touchdown pass from Kent Graham to give them a 20–16 lead which held when the defense stopped the Broncos on their final drive. The Broncos had not lost a game since Week 16 of the previous season, having won their last regular season game, three playoff games, Super Bowl XXXII, and the first thirteen games of the 1998 season entering the matchup with the Giants.

== Offseason ==
=== NFL draft ===
1998 New York Giants draft
Round	Pick	Player	Position	College	Notes
1	24	Shaun Williams	S	UCLA	
2	55	Joe Jurevicius	WR	Penn State	
3	70	Brian Alford	WR	Purdue	
5	147	Toby Myles	T	Jackson State	
6	177	Todd Pollack	TE	Boston College	
7	213	Ben Fricke	C	Houston	
Made roster † Pro Football Hall of Fame * Made at least one Pro Bowl during career

== Personnel ==
=== Staff ===
1998 New York Giants staff
Front office: President and co-chief executive officer – Wellington Mara; Chairman and co-chief executive officer – Preston Robert Tisch; Executive vice president and general counsel – John Mara; Vice president and general manager – Ernie Accorsi; Assistant general manager – Rick Donohue; Vice president of player personnel – Tom Boisture; Special assistant to the general manager – Harry Hulmes; Director of player personnel – Marv Sunderland; Director of pro personnel – Tim Rooney; Director of college scouting – Jerry Shay; Assistant director of pro personnel – David Gettleman; Head coaches: Head coach – Jim Fassel; Offensive coaches: Offensive coordinator/running backs – Jim Skipper; Quarterbacks – Rod Dowhower; Wide receivers – Jimmy Robinson; Tight ends/assistant offensive line – Dick Rehbein; Offensive line – John Matsko; Offensive assistant – Mike Gillhamer	Defensive coaches: Defensive coordinator – John Fox; Defensive line – Denny Marcin; Linebackers – Mike Haluchak; Defensive backs – Johnnie Lynn; Defensive quality control – Dave Brazil; Special teams coaches: Special teams – Larry MacDuff; Strength and conditioning: Strength and conditioning – John Dunn; Assistant strength and conditioning – Craig Stoddard

=== Roster ===
1998 New York Giants roster
Quarterbacks (QB): 18 Mike Cherry; 10 Kent Graham; 13 Danny Kanell; Running backs (RB): 21 Tiki Barber KR; 33 Gary Brown; 45 Greg Comella FB; 30 Charles Way; 28 Tyrone Wheatley; Wide receivers (WR): 84 Brian Alford; 80 Chris Calloway; 88 Ike Hilliard; 86 Joe Jurevicius; 81 Amani Toomer PR; Tight ends (TE): 87 Howard Cross; 89 Andy Haase	Offensive linemen (OL): 78 Greg Bishop G; 69 Derek Engler C; 74 Scott Gragg T; 76 Nate Miller G; 70 Toby Myles T; 72 Roman Oben T; 66 Jerry Reynolds G/T; 53 Lance Scott C; 65 Ron Stone G; 62 Jason Whittle G/T; Defensive linemen (DL): 77 Chad Bratzke DE; 95 Keith Council DE; 75 Keith Hamilton DT; 97 Robert Harris DT; 79 Bernard Holsey DE/DT; 94 Cedric Jones DE; 99 Christian Peter DT; 92 Michael Strahan DE; 96 George Williams DT	Linebackers (LB): 98 Jessie Armstead OLB; 55 Marcus Buckley OLB; 58 Doug Colman MLB; 51 Pete Monty MLB; 91 Ryan Phillips OLB; 90 Corey Widmer MLB; Defensive backs (DB): 26 Kory Blackwell CB; 25 Curtis Buckley CB/S; 43 Percy Ellsworth S; 20 Sam Garnes SS; 24 Carlton Gray CB; 41 Conrad Hamilton CB; 39 Jeremy Lincoln CB; 34 Brandon Sanders SS; 22 Phillippi Sparks CB; 36 Shaun Williams FS; 29 Tito Wooten FS; Special teams (ST): 3 Brad Daluiso K; 9 Brad Maynard P	Practice squad: 71 Hunter Adams DE; 48 Scott Dragos FB; 54 Chike Egbuniwe LB; 35 Malcolm Thomas RB; Reserve: 52 Scott Galyon LB (IR); 23 LeShon Johnson RB (NF-Ill.); 57 Corey Miller LB (IR); 67 Lonnie Palelei T (IR); 83 David Patten WR (IR); 85 Alfred Pupunu TE (IR); 31 Jason Sehorn CB (IR); 59 Brian Williams C (PUP); 47 Rodney Young S (IR); 73 Rob Zatechka G (IR); Rookies in italics 53 active, 10 reserve, 4 practice squad

== Preseason ==
Week	Date	Opponent	Result	Record	Venue	Recap
1	August 8	Cincinnati Bengals	W 24–17	1–0	Giants Stadium	Recap
2	August 14	at Jacksonville Jaguars	L 10–24	1–1	Alltel Stadium	Recap
3	August 20	at New York Jets	L 23–27	1–2	Giants Stadium	Recap
4	August 28	Baltimore Ravens	L 6–14	1–3	Giants Stadium	Recap

== Regular season ==
=== Schedule ===
Week	Date	Opponent	Result	Record	Venue	Recap
1	September 6	**Washington Redskins**	**W** 31–24	1–0	Giants Stadium	Recap
2	September 13	at Oakland Raiders	**L** 17–20	1–1	Network Associates Coliseum	Recap
3	September 21	**Dallas Cowboys**	**L** 7–31	1–2	Giants Stadium	Recap
4	September 27	at San Diego Chargers	**W** 34–16	2–2	Qualcomm Stadium	Recap
5	October 4	at Tampa Bay Buccaneers	**L** 3–20	2–3	Raymond James Stadium	Recap
6	October 11	Atlanta Falcons	**L** 20–34	2–4	Giants Stadium	Recap
7	October 18	**Arizona Cardinals**	**W** 34–7	3–4	Giants Stadium	Recap
8	Bye					
9	November 1	at **Washington Redskins**	**L** 14–21	3–5	Jack Kent Cooke Stadium	Recap
10	November 8	at **Dallas Cowboys**	**L** 6–16	3–6	Texas Stadium	Recap
11	November 15	Green Bay Packers	**L** 3–37	3–7	Giants Stadium	Recap
12	November 22	**Philadelphia Eagles**	**W** 20–0	4–7	Giants Stadium	Recap
13	November 30	at San Francisco 49ers	**L** 7–31	4–8	3Com Park	Recap
14	December 6	at **Arizona Cardinals**	**W** 23–19	5–8	Sun Devil Stadium	Recap
15	December 13	Denver Broncos	**W** 20–16	6–8	Giants Stadium	Recap
16	December 20	Kansas City Chiefs	**W** 28–7	7–8	Giants Stadium	Recap
17	December 27	at **Philadelphia Eagles**	**W** 20–10	8–8	Veterans Stadium	Recap
Note: Intra-division opponents are in **bold** text.

=== Game summaries ===
==== Week 1: vs. Washington Redskins ====
Week 1: Washington Redskins at New York Giants – Game summary

Quarter	1	2	3	4	Total
Redskins	7	3	7	7	**24**
**Giants**	0	10	21	0	**31**

at Giants Stadium, East Rutherford, New Jersey

- Date: September 6
- Game time: 1:00 p.m. EDT
- Game weather: Sunny, 86 °F (30 °C)
- Game attendance: 76,629
- Referee: Tom White
- TV announcers (Fox): Pat Summerall, John Madden and Suzy Kolber

Game information

**First quarter**

- WAS – Leslie Shepherd 17-yard pass from Gus Frerotte (Scott Blanton kick), 8:44. Redskins 7–0. **Drive: 4 plays, 46 yards, 1:40.**

**Second quarter**

- NYG – Brad Daluiso 35-yard field goal, 14:51. Redskins 7–3. **Drive: 8 plays, 31 yards, 2:58.**
- WAS – Scott Blanton 46-yard field goal, 2:57. Redskins 10–3. **Drive: 8 plays, 52 yards, 3:46.**
- NYG – Chris Calloway 9-yard pass from Danny Kanell (Brad Daluiso kick), 0:28. Tied 10–10. **Drive: 6 plays, 71 yards, 2:29.**

**Third quarter**

- NYG – Charles Way 2-yard run (Brad Daluiso kick), 13:06. Giants 17–10. **Drive: 1 play, 2 yards, 0:07.**
- NYG – Michael Strahan 24-yard interception return (Brad Daluiso kick), 12:07. Giants 24–10.
- WAS – Larry Bowie 4-yard pass from Trent Green (Scott Blanton kick), 3:56. Giants 24–17. **Drive: 6 plays, 90 yards, 3:18.**
- NYG – Amani Toomer 22-yard pass from Danny Kanell (Brad Daluiso kick), 1:33. Giants 31–17. **Drive: 1 play, 22 yards, 0:07.**

**Fourth quarter**

- WAS – Stephen Alexander 1-yard pass from Trent Green (Scott Blanton kick), 6:16. Giants 31–24. **Drive: 10 plays, 56 yards, 5:20.**

**Top passers**

- WAS – Trent Green – 17/25, 208 yards, 2 TD
- NYG – Danny Kanell – 15/28, 159 yards, 2 TD, INT

**Top rushers**

- WAS – Terry Allen – 18 rushes, 67 yards
- NYG – Tiki Barber – 12 rushes, 37 yards

**Top receivers**

- WAS – Leslie Shepherd – 4 receptions, 74 yards, TD
- NYG – Ike Hilliard – 2 receptions, 50 yards

Just like they had in 1997, the Giants used the power of their pass rush and domination in the turnover battle to defeat the Redskins 31-24 for their 100th win at Giants Stadium, sacking Washington's quarterbacks eight times and turning three third-quarter takeaways into three touchdowns.

The Redskins scored first after a 37-yard punt return by Brian Mitchell led to quarterback Gus Frerotte finding wide receiver Leslie Shepherd for a 17-yard touchdown. Late in the first quarter, a 15-yard punt return by Amani Toomer set the Giants up in Washington territory, which eventually led to a 35-yard Brad Daluiso field goal after a third-down drop by wide receiver Ike Hilliard.

On the ensuing drive, Frerotte hit Michael Westbrook for a 31-yard touchdown, but right tackle Shar Pourdanesh was called for holding on Michael Strahan; then consecutive sacks by Keith Hamilton and Chad Bratzke killed the possession. Quarterback Danny Kanell hit rookie wide receiver Joe Jurevicius for 22 yards on 3rd-and-7, but he was later flagged for unsportsmanlike conduct, forcing New York to punt. Late in the second quarter, a 46-yard field goal by Scott Blanton increased the Redskins' lead to 10–3.

Two plays from scrimmage later, Kanell hit Hilliard—who only played two games his rookie year after a neck injury led to posterior spine stabilization surgery—for a 45-yard gain. Three straight carries by fullback Charles Way gave the Giants 1st-and-Goal at the 9-yard line. Kanell was intercepted by cornerback Cris Dishman on the next play, but linebacker Marvcus Patton was flagged for defensive holding; Kanell made them pay by rolling out and hitting wide receiver Chris Calloway in the corner of the end zone for a touchdown, faking out Dishman in the process.

With the score tied at 10 at the start of the third quarter, David Patten returned the opening kickoff 45 yards to Washington's 44; but on 3rd-and-3, Kanell missed Patten with a deep pass that would've gone for a touchdown. However, Brad Maynard's ensuing punt set Washington up at their 5, and Frerotte's next pass was deflected by cornerback Phillippi Sparks and intercepted by a diving Conrad Hamilton, filling in for the injured Jason Sehorn. His return to the 2 led to a touchdown run by Way.

Immediately after, Frerotte's throw to tight end Jamie Asher was intercepted by Strahan—who had dropped back into coverage because of a zone blitz—and returned 24 yards for another score, putting the Giants up 24–10. On the next drive, Frerotte—already a little banged up after trying to make a tackle on Hamilton's pick—was sacked on consecutive plays by Strahan and a combined Bratzke and Keith Hamilton; he would leave the game with a sprained left shoulder.

After a Giants punt, Trent Green—who had only one pass to his name in a four-year career—hit a deep throw to Westbrook for 62 yards; that led to a touchdown toss to fullback Larry Bowie. But after New York went three-and-out, Green was sacked by defensive tackle Christian Peter and fumbled, with Hamilton recovering; one play later, Kanell hit Toomer with a tightly thrown pass for a touchdown, increasing their lead to 31–17.

In the fourth quarter, an interception by former Giants safety Jesse Campbell led to Green converting on a 3rd-and-14 pass to Shepherd and a 4th-and-2 pass to Westbrook; soon after, Green completed a pass to tight end Stephen Alexander for a 1-yard score, making it 31–24 with 6:16 remaining.

On their next possession, a 24-yard pass to Alexander put the Redskins at the Giants' 38; but Green's fourth-down pass for Westbrook was knocked away by safety Percy Ellsworth, and their last-ditch drive failed to cross midfield, with the ball slipping out of Green's hand on a pump-fake for an incomplete pass on 4th-and-10.

With two sacks and an interception return for his first career touchdown, Strahan was named NFC Defensive Player of the Week, as the Giants' defense overcame a relatively unproductive offensive outing.

==== Week 2: at Oakland Raiders ====
Week 2: New York Giants at Oakland Raiders – Game summary

Quarter	1	2	3	4	Total
Giants	7	0	10	0	**17**
**Raiders**	7	3	7	3	**20**

at Network Associates Coliseum, Oakland, California

- Date: September 13
- Game time: 4:15 p.m. EDT/1:15 p.m. PDT
- Game weather: Mostly sunny, 77 °F (25 °C)
- Game attendance: 40,545
- Referee: Dick Hantak
- TV announcers (Fox): Tim Ryan, Bill Maas and Ronnie Lott

Game information

**First quarter**

- OAK – Napoleon Kaufman 80-yard run (Greg Davis kick), 14:43. Raiders 7–0. **Drive: 1 play, 80 yards, 0:17.**
- NYG – Ike Hilliard 10-yard pass from Danny Kanell (Brad Daluiso kick), 11:03. Tied 7–7. **Drive: 8 plays, 77 yards, 3:40.**

**Second quarter**

- OAK – Greg Davis 41-yard field goal, 0:00. Raiders 10–7. **Drive: 8 plays, 57 yards, 1:02.**

**Third quarter**

- NYG – Chris Calloway 20-yard pass from Danny Kanell (Brad Daluiso kick), 11:47. Giants 14–10. **Drive: 5 plays, 46 yards, 3:13.**
- OAK – Tim Brown 22-yard pass from Jeff George (Greg Davis kick), 8:03. Raiders 17–14. **Drive: 9 plays, 60 yards, 3:44.**
- NYG – Brad Daluiso 43-yard field goal, 0:50. Tied 17–17. **Drive: 4 plays, −10 yards, 1:34.**

**Fourth quarter**

- OAK – Greg Davis 26-yard field goal, 1:58. Raiders 20–17. **Drive: 10 plays, 41 yards, 3:39.**

**Top passers**

- NYG – Danny Kanell – 23/33, 188 yards, 2 TD, INT
- OAK – Jeff George – 25/44, 303 yards, TD

**Top rushers**

- NYG – Tiki Barber – 13 rushes, 32 yards
- OAK – Napoleon Kaufman – 20 rushes, 139 yards, TD

**Top receivers**

- NYG – Ike Hilliard – 8 receptions, 78 yards, TD
- OAK – Tim Brown – 6 receptions, 127 yards, TD

An early-season cross-country trip to Oakland—the Giants' first game there since 1973—resulted in a disappointing loss to the Raiders, a game dominated by penalties and decided by timely defensive breakdowns and an inefficient New York offense.

On the first play, running back Napoleon Kaufman broke through the line and raced 80 yards for a touchdown, longer than any play the Giants had allowed from scrimmage the previous year. But Charles Way hit back with a 21-yard run, aided by 15 yards with a late hit by safety Eric Turner; then an 18-yard pass from Danny Kanell to Ike Hilliard put the Giants in the red zone. Four plays later, he hit Hilliard again on a slant for a hard-fought score; it was Hilliard's first career touchdown and the first for the Giants on their opening drive since Week 15 of the 1996 season.

Neither team gained a first down on each of their next two drives, as Kanell was sacked by defensive end Lance Johnstone and quarterback Jeff George by Michael Strahan, while a 26-yard completion to tight end Howard Cross was wiped out by holding on center Lance Scott. A 49-yard catch-and-run by Tim Brown got the Raiders off their own 4-yard line, but a sack by Chad Bratzke killed the possession.

The game trudged through the second quarter, as neither team crossed midfield until the four-minute mark, with both Tiki Barber and Gary Brown being stopped for losses on 3rd-and-short situations, while George threw a third-down pass short of the mark to wide receiver James Jett, and had another pass nearly intercepted by safety Tito Wooten.

After a New York punt, the Raiders took over at their own 20-yard line with 1:02 remaining in the first half; George then hit consecutive passes to Jett for 25 yards to get into Giants territory. Two plays later, he found wide receiver Terry Mickens for a 10-yard gain, and then threw a screen pass to Kaufman for 12 yards; Kaufman fumbled on the play and linebacker Ryan Phillips recovered, but an inadvertent whistle by referee Dick Hantak negated the turnover. Soon after, a 41-yard Greg Davis field goal gave Oakland a 10–7 lead as the half expired.

The third quarter began similarly for both teams; David Patten returned the kickoff 49 yards, Kanell fumbled on a sack by defensive end James Harris but right tackle Scott Gragg recovered, and a Brad Daluiso field goal was taken off the board when linebacker James Folston was called for defensive holding, leading to Kanell hitting Chris Calloway for a 20-yard touchdown. Then a 42-yard kickoff return by Desmond Howard led to an eventual 3rd-and-1 at the Giants' 29; George fumbled the snap, but fell on top of it, and then threw to fullback Jon Ritchie on fourth down for seven yards. Three plays later, he hit Brown, who beat Conrad Hamilton for a 22-yard score, putting the Raiders back up 17–14.

After Brad Maynard's next punt was downed by Pete Monty at the 1, George had a pass for Ritchie stripped by defensive tackle Robert Harris for a fumble, which linebacker Marcus Buckley recovered at the 15. But the Giants went backwards in three plays, so they brought on Daluiso to tie the game with a field goal. The Raiders' next drive was foiled by a Strahan sack, and a 39-yard punt return by Amani Toomer set the Giants up at Oakland's 36; but after a 14-yard run by Barber, the series stalled, and Daluiso missed wide right on a 40-yard kick.

Bratzke forced a fumble on his next sack of George, but left tackle Pat Harlow recovered; it still forced the Raiders into a 3rd-and-26, but George found tight end Rickey Dudley down the seam for 26 yards. A 29-yard pass to Brown on 3rd-and-8 set up a 3rd-and-inches at the Giants' 18 with eight minutes left. But left guard Steve Wisniewski was flagged for false start, and Jessie Armstead sacked George and forced a fumble; Harlow recovered again, but they were knocked out of field goal range and punted down to the 6.

However, the Giants went three-and-out, with a holding call on Gragg—the 31st and last accepted penalty of the game—negating Hilliard's first-down catch, and Oakland got the ball back at New York's 49. An 8-yard run by Kaufman, a 13-yard catch by Brown, and a 10-yard catch by Howard on 3rd-and-10 put the ball at the 13-yard line; the Giants' defense finally tightened up, so Davis kicked a 26-yard field goal, giving Oakland a 20–17 lead at the two-minute warning.

With one time-out remaining, the Giants took over at their own 21; Kanell hit Hilliard for 9 yards, then Barber out of the backfield, but he was knocked out of bounds inches short of the first down. On third down, Turner knocked away the pass for Barber; however, Kanell ran a quarterback sneak for the first down. After spiking the ball to stop the clock, Kanell completed to Hilliard for 10 yards, and then Barber for four up to the 45 as the clock reached under a minute. But after Charles Woodson knocked away Kanell's pass for Joe Jurevicius, Turner blitzed and sacked him for an 11-yard loss. The Giants hurried to the line on fourth down, but Turner this time intercepted Kanell's pass for Hilliard, sealing the Raiders win.

George threw for 303 yards despite being sacked five times, while the Giants converted on just 1-of-14 third downs and committed 15 of the penalties, with nine of them for pre-snap movement.

==== Week 3: vs. Dallas Cowboys ====
Week 3: Dallas Cowboys at New York Giants – Game summary

Quarter	1	2	3	4	Total
**Cowboys**	0	17	7	7	**31**
Giants	0	7	0	0	**7**

at Giants Stadium, East Rutherford, New Jersey

- Date: September 21
- Game time: 8:20 p.m. EDT
- Game weather: Partly cloudy, 78 °F (26 °C)
- Game attendance: 78,039
- Referee: Walt Coleman
- TV announcers (ABC): Al Michaels, Dan Dierdorf, Boomer Esiason and Lesley Visser

Game information

**First quarter**

- No scoring plays.

**Second quarter**

- DAL – Deion Sanders 59-yard punt return (Richie Cunningham kick), 12:31. Cowboys 7–0.
- NYG – Amani Toomer 36-yard pass from Danny Kanell (Brad Daluiso kick), 3:54. Tied 7–7. **Drive: 9 plays, 74 yards, 3:38.**
- DAL – Billy Davis 80-yard pass from Jason Garrett (Richie Cunningham kick), 2:45. Cowboys 14–7. **Drive: 3 plays, 80 yards, 1:09.**
- DAL – Richie Cunningham 40-yard field goal, 0:07. Cowboys 17–7. **Drive: 8 plays, 31 yards, 2:03.**

**Third quarter**

- DAL – Sherman Williams 18-yard run (Richie Cunningham kick), 9:20. Cowboys 24–7. **Drive: 5 plays, 82 yards, 2:23.**

**Fourth quarter**

- DAL – Deion Sanders 71-yard interception return (Richie Cunningham kick), 2:25. Cowboys 31–7.

**Top passers**

- DAL – Jason Garrett – 11/27, 224 yards, TD
- NYG – Danny Kanell – 25/45, 228 yards, TD, 2 INT

**Top rushers**

- DAL – Sherman Williams – 21 rushes, 60 yards, TD
- NYG – Charles Way – 9 rushes, 26 yards

**Top receivers**

- DAL – Billy Davis – 1 reception, 80 yards, TD
- NYG – Chris Calloway – 7 receptions, 77 yards

The Giants hosted their division rivals the Cowboys in their first Monday Night Football game since Week 1 of the 1995 season, also against Dallas. But much like that time, what looked on paper like an evenly matched contest became a Cowboys rout, as turnovers, penalties and an extraordinary performance from Deion Sanders led to a 31-7 drubbing of New York.

For the majority of the first half, neither offense could cross midfield, as Danny Kanell was sacked on 3rd-and-4 by safety Omar Stoutmire, and Emmitt Smith struggled to get untracked, eventually leaving the game with a strained groin. But early in the second quarter, Brad Maynard's line-drive punt was fielded by Sanders at his 41-yard line, where he swooped around the Giants' coverage and took it all the way for a touchdown, high-stepping the last 10 yards.

Midway through the period, New York finally sustained a drive, as Kanell hit Chris Calloway for 14 yards on 3rd-and-9, and a defensive holding on defensive back Kevin Mathis gave the Giants a first down at Dallas's 36. Two plays later, Kanell threw a perfect deep pass to Amani Toomer for a touchdown; but just three plays later, quarterback Jason Garrett—making only his third career start for the injured Troy Aikman—completed a downfield pass to wide receiver Billy Davis, and a bad angle taken by Tito Wooten sprung him free to take it 80 yards for a touchdown, putting the Cowboys up 14–7.

With less than three minutes left in the half, Kanell's next pass for David Patten was intercepted by Mathis, giving Dallas the ball back at their own 46. A pass interference on Phillippi Sparks gave them a first down on 3rd-and-11, and an 11-yard catch by Michael Irvin on a deflected pass led to a 40-yard Richie Cunningham field goal in the closing seconds.

On their second possession of the third quarter, the Cowboys faced 3rd-and-8, and Garrett unleashed a deep pass to Sanders—in the game on offense—who beat Wooten and cornerback Carlton Gray for a 55-yard gain. Two plays later, running back Sherman Williams shot up the middle and raced 18 yards for a touchdown to put Dallas up 24–7.

New York's offense sputtered, as Kanell was sacked on consecutive drives by defensive tackles Leon Lett and Chad Hennings, while Garrett hit Irvin with a 30-yard pass and Sanders returned a punt 39 yards; however, a missed Cunningham field goal kept the score the same early in the fourth. From there, Kanell hit six of his next eight passes, including a 25-yard completion to Calloway on 3rd-and-14, as the Giants reached the Cowboys 33. But Ike Hilliard was stripped off the ball on a catch by rookie defensive end Greg Ellis, and Stoutmire recovered.

Williams carried the ball eight straight times to burn the next six minutes of the clock; only four remained by the time the Giants got it back. Kanell completed passes to Hilliard and Tiki Barber to move them into Dallas territory; but on 4th-and-10, Kanell's throw to Patten was intercepted by Sanders, who capped off his night by running it back for a 71-yard touchdown, this time high-stepping the last quarter of the field.

Sanders accumulated 226 all-purpose yards on the night, living up to his "Prime Time" moniker, while the Giants committed four turnovers and 11 penalties, and their running game that was 7th in the NFL the previous year gained just 56 yards.

==== Week 4: at San Diego Chargers ====
Week 4: New York Giants at San Diego Chargers – Game summary

Quarter	1	2	3	4	Total
**Giants**	14	7	7	6	**34**
Chargers	0	6	10	0	**16**

at Qualcomm Stadium, San Diego, California

- Date: September 27
- Game time: 4:15 p.m. EDT/1:15 p.m. PDT
- Game weather: Mostly sunny, 68 °F (20 °C)
- Game attendance: 55,672
- Referee: Phil Luckett
- TV announcers (Fox): Dick Stockton, Matt Millen and Curt Menefee

Game information

**First quarter**

- NYG – Gary Brown 4-yard run (Brad Daluiso kick), 4:08. Giants 7–0. **Drive: 12 plays, 70 yards, 4:01.**
- NYG – Chris Calloway 25-yard pass from Danny Kanell (Brad Daluiso kick), 0:50. Giants 14–0. **Drive: 2 plays, 27 yards, 0:38.**

**Second quarter**

- NYG – Charles Way 1-yard run (Brad Daluiso kick), 7:52. Giants 21–0. **Drive: 10 plays, 61 yards, 4:23.**
- SD – John Carney 41-yard field goal, 1:51. Giants 21–3. **Drive: 8 plays, 41 yards, 2:21.**
- SD – John Carney 46-yard field goal, 0:00. Giants 21–6. **Drive: 5 plays, 32 yards, 0:51.**

**Third quarter**

- SD – John Carney 34-yard field goal, 9:33. Giants 21–9. **Drive: 7 plays, 48 yards, 3:43.**
- NYG – Percy Ellsworth 20-yard interception return (Brad Daluiso kick), 7:38. Giants 28–9.
- SD – Charlie Jones 41-yard pass from Craig Whelihan (John Carney kick), 5:28. Giants 28–16. **Drive: 4 plays, 63 yards, 2:10.**

**Fourth quarter**

- NYG – Brad Daluiso 32-yard field goal, 11:43. Giants 31–16. **Drive: 7 plays, 23 yards, 2:05.**
- NYG – Brad Daluiso 19-yard field goal, 4:48. Giants 34–16. **Drive: 7 plays, 45 yards, 3:52.**

**Top passers**

- NYG – Danny Kanell – 17/33, 208 yards, TD, INT
- SD – Ryan Leaf – 15/34, 193 yards, 4 INT

**Top rushers**

- NYG – Gary Brown – 20 rushes, 66 yards, TD
- SD – Natrone Means – 11 rushes, 56 yards

**Top receivers**

- NYG – Chris Calloway – 6 receptions, 94 yards
- SD – Bryan Still – 8 receptions, 104 yards

The Giants broke out of their two-game slump with a 34–16 win over the Chargers, as the defense forced embattled rookie quarterback Ryan Leaf to throw four interceptions.

On New York's second possession, Danny Kanell completed four passes to Ike Hilliard and Chris Calloway for 57 yards, three times on third down and twice on 3rd-and-10 or more. From the 4-yard line, Gary Brown—San Diego's leading rusher the previous year—barreled in for a touchdown. On the ensuing drive, Leaf mishandled the low third-down shotgun snap; he recovered it, but with rookie safety Shaun Williams blitzing, his hurried pass was intercepted by Carlton Gray and returned to their 27. Two plays later, Kanell found Calloway with a perfect pass for a touchdown to give the Giants an early 14–0 lead.

Leaf's next deep pass was intercepted by Phillippi Sparks when rookie wide receiver Mikhael Ricks fell down; but the defense forced a punt, and a 28-yard run by Natrone Means plus a 22-yard pass to Terrell Fletcher put the Chargers at the Giants 31. However, Leaf—coming off a 1-of-15, five-turnover abomination in Kansas City—was intercepted again, this time by Percy Ellsworth; Kanell, meanwhile, continued to hook up with Calloway and Hilliard, hitting the former for 17 yards on 3rd-and-10 and the latter for 22 yards down to the 5. Four plays later, Charles Way plowed into the end zone from inside the 1.

Late in the first half, a 23-yard pass to wide receiver Bryan Still and a fourth-down pass interference on Ellsworth led to a 41-yard John Carney field goal; then after a New York three-and-out, Leaf passed and ran the Chargers into field goal range, where Carney connected from 46 yards out on the last play.

In the third quarter, Leaf completed a pass to wide receiver Webster Slaughter for 31 yards to put San Diego at New York's 22. But after a holding penalty, they eventually had to settle for Carney's third field goal. The Giants went three-and-out on their fourth straight drive, but from his own 12, Leaf's third-down pass was intercepted again by Ellsworth, who ran it back for a touchdown to give New York a 28–9 lead.

Craig Whelihan replaced Leaf at quarterback and promptly hit wide receiver Charlie Jones on his second pass for a 41-yard touchdown. Kanell responded by completing passes to Calloway, Brown and Amani Toomer for first downs, moving them from their own 14 to San Diego's 27; but his 3rd-and-13 pass was picked off by former Giant safety Greg Jackson. However, the defense forced a three-and-out, and the short field led to Brad Daluiso kicking a 32-yard field goal early in the fourth.

Trailing 31–16, Whelihan completed a pass to tight end Freddie Jones for 26 yards and then ran for 12; but on 4th-and-7 from New York's 38-yard line, Whelihan was sacked by defensive end Cedric Jones and fumbled. From there, the Giants ran the ball with Brown, while a pass interference call on cornerback Terrance Shaw put the ball at the six, eventually leading to a short Daluiso field goal that finished the scoring.

The win broke the Giants' seven-game losing streak on the West Coast going all the way back to 1990, as they evened their record at 2-2. This would be the Giants last win over the Chargers until 2025.

==== Week 5: at Tampa Bay Buccaneers ====
Week 5: New York Giants at Tampa Bay Buccaneers – Game summary

Quarter	1	2	3	4	Total
Giants	0	0	0	3	**3**
**Buccaneers**	10	0	0	10	**20**

at Raymond James Stadium, Tampa, Florida

- Date: October 4
- Game time: 4:15 p.m. EDT
- Game weather: Partly cloudy, 86 °F (30 °C)
- Game attendance: 64,989
- Referee: Jerry Markbreit
- TV announcers (Fox): Sam Rosen and Jerry Glanville

Game information

**First quarter**

- TB – Charles Mincy 22-yard interception return (Michael Husted kick), 13:26. Buccaneers 7–0.
- TB – Michael Husted 35-yard field goal, 0:52. Buccaneers 10–0. **Drive: 11 plays, 40 yards, 6:07.**

**Second quarter**

- No scoring plays.

**Third quarter**

- No scoring plays.

**Fourth quarter**

- NYG – Brad Daluiso 22-yard field goal, 13:20. Buccaneers 10–3. **Drive: 4 plays, 5 yards, 1:32.**
- TB – Michael Husted 26-yard field goal, 5:02. Buccaneers 13–3. **Drive: 13 plays, 61 yards, 8:18.**
- TB – Mike Alstott 1-yard run (Michael Husted kick), 1:54. Buccaneers 20–3. **Drive: 5 plays, 30 yards, 2:05.**

**Top passers**

- NYG – Danny Kanell – 10/27, 83 yards, 3 INT
- TB – Trent Dilfer – 12/20, 85 yards, INT

**Top rushers**

- NYG – Gary Brown – 17 rushes, 67 yards
- TB – Mike Alsott – 17 rushes, 86 yards, TD

**Top receivers**

- NYG – Charles Way – 2 receptions, 25 yards
- TB – Mike Alstott – 2 receptions, 29 yards

On a hot afternoon in Tampa, the Giants' offense staggered to a 20–3 defeat against the Buccaneers, as they put up only eight first downs, gained just 135 yards, and possessed the ball barely 21 of the 60 minutes.

It started bad on the opening drive, as Danny Kanell's second pass was behind Tiki Barber and intercepted by safety Charles Mincy, who returned it 22 yards for a touchdown, Tampa Bay's first first-quarter points of the season. After an exchange of punts, the Giants took over at midfield, and Kanell completed third-down passes to Charles Way and Amani Toomer to reach the Buccaneers' 21-yard line. But he was intercepted by defensive end Regan Upshaw playing a zone blitz to kill the possession.

Quarterback Trent Dilfer completed passes to tight end Dave Moore and wide receiver Karl Williams to get Tampa Bay into field goal range; Michael Strahan forced a fumble on a sack, but wide receiver Reidel Anthony recovered, and Michael Husted kicked a 35-yard field goal for a 10–0 lead. The score held through the second quarter, as Kanell was sacked by defensive end Tyoka Jackson and Dilfer by Keith Hamilton; Dilfer had a pass deflected and intercepted by linebacker Marcus Buckley, but Kanell failed to capitalize with the field position.

Warrick Dunn carried six times on the Buccaneers' first drive of the third quarter with success, but a sack by Tito Wooten forced a punt; then Mike Alstott was stuffed short on 4th-and-inches just beyond midfield. A 17-yard run by Gary Brown put the Giants at the Tampa Bay 30; but on fourth down, Brad Maynard tried to pass out of a fake field goal, and the throw wobbled incomplete.

It was still 10–0 at the start of the fourth when Dilfer fumbled on a Carlton Gray sack, and Conrad Hamilton recovered at the Buccaneers' 10; however, the Giants failed to score a touchdown, so Brad Daluiso kicked a short field goal.

Tampa Bay responded with a 13-play, 61-yard drive that took over eight minutes off the clock, handing off or passing to Dunn, Alstott and fullback Lorenzo Neal on every play. Eventually, they settled for a Husted field goal to make the score 13–3; two plays later, Kanell was intercepted by cornerback Ronde Barber for his career-high third pick, and Alstott rumbled 28 yards to set up his own touchdown to ice the game.

Kanell completed just 10-of-27 passes for 83 yards, while New York's battered defense wore down and gave up 174 rushing yards as they fell out of their tie for first place in the NFC East.

==== Week 6: vs. Atlanta Falcons ====
Week 6: Atlanta Falcons at New York Giants – Game summary

Quarter	1	2	3	4	Total
**Falcons**	7	7	10	10	**34**
Giants	6	7	0	7	**20**

at Giants Stadium, East Rutherford, New Jersey

- Date: October 11
- Game time: 8:20 p.m. EDT
- Game weather: Partly cloudy, 70 °F (21 °C)
- Game attendance: 71,173
- Referee: Mike Carey
- TV announcers (ESPN): Mike Patrick, Joe Theismann, Paul Maguire and Solomon Wilcots

Game information

**First quarter**

- NYG – Brad Daluiso 46-yard field goal, 10:29. Giants 3–0. **Drive: 6 plays, 7 yards, 2:31.**
- ATL – Tony Martin 36-yard pass from Chris Chandler (Morten Andersen kick), 8:05. Falcons 7–3. **Drive: 4 plays, 70 yards, 2:24.**
- NYG – Brad Daluiso 45-yard field goal, 1:26. Falcons 7–6. **Drive: 10 plays, 23 yards, 4:08.**

**Second quarter**

- ATL – Antonio Edwards 2-yard fumble return (Morten Andersen kick), 13:05. Falcons 14–6.
- NYG – David Patten 39-yard pass from Danny Kanell (Brad Daluiso kick), 0:33. Falcons 14–13. **Drive: 8 plays, 72 yards, 1:27.**

**Third quarter**

- ATL – Morten Andersen 26-yard field goal, 8:39. Falcons 17–13. **Drive: 11 plays, 65 yards, 6:21.**
- ATL – Terance Mathis 55-yard pass from Chris Chandler (Morten Andersen kick), 3:28. Falcons 24–13. **Drive: 5 plays, 79 yards, 3:32.**

**Fourth quarter**

- ATL – Chris Chandler 1-yard run (Morten Andersen kick), 9:51. Falcons 31–13. **Drive: 8 plays, 87 yards, 5:02.**
- ATL – Morten Andersen 32-yard field goal, 6:21. Falcons 34–13. **Drive: 4 plays, 0 yards, 3:08.**
- NYG – Kent Graham 5-yard run (Brad Daluiso kick), 2:44. Falcons 34–20. **Drive: 12 plays, 75 yards, 3:37.**

**Top passers**

- ATL – Chris Chandler – 14/27, 266 yards, 2 TD
- NYG – Kent Graham – 11/16, 105 yards

**Top rushers**

- ATL – Jamal Anderson – 29 rushes, 110 yards
- NYG – Charles Way – 11 rushes, 39 yards

**Top receivers**

- ATL – Terance Mathis – 2 receptions, 79 yards, TD
- NYG – David Patten – 3 receptions, 59 yards, TD

The Giants hosted the surprising Falcons—led by their former head coach Dan Reeves—on Sunday Night Football, and fell 34–20 as Atlanta blew the game open in the second half, with New York's offense again coming up short.

They were given an early opportunity as running back Jamal Anderson fumbled on their first play from scrimmage and Conrad Hamilton recovered; but after left guard Greg Bishop was called for holding, the Giants had to settle for a 46-yard Brad Daluiso field goal. Then after defensive back Jeremy Lincoln was flagged for pass interference on third down, quarterback Chris Chandler play-faked to Anderson and hit wide receiver Tony Martin for a 36-yard touchdown.

Later in the first quarter, Charles Way carried four times for 20 yards on a drive that started at midfield, including a 5-yard sweep on 4th-and-3; but Kanell was sacked by defensive linemen Shane Dronett and Chuck Smith, so Daluiso kicked another field goal. After a Falcons punt, the Giants took over at their own 10-yard line; but after gaining five yards on an offsides, Kanell had the ball stripped out of his hands on a rollout by defensive end Antonio Edwards, who caught it out of the air and went in for a score to put Atlanta up 14–6.

Soon after, a third-down sack by Jessie Armstead knocked the Falcons out of field goal range; then he forced a fumble of fullback Bob Christian, which linebacker Corey Widmer recovered. But on the next play, Howard Cross fumbled it right back to Dronett; however, a pair of holding penalties halted the ensuing drive, and with two minutes left in the first half, Kanell completed passes to Ike Hilliard, Tiki Barber and Amani Toomer for short gains before hitting David Patten deep for a 39-yard touchdown due to a blown coverage.

Now clinging to a 14–13 lead, the Falcons came out in the third quarter and used the running of Anderson and passing of Chandler to fuel an 11-play, 65-yard drive; pass deflections by Carlton Gray and Christian Peter held them to a 26-yard Morten Andersen field goal, but the Giants offense went three-and-out, and after Anderson picked up 34 yards on four touches, Chandler hit wide receiver Terance Mathis for a 55-yard touchdown, burning Gray on the play.

New York's offense continued to sputter, as cornerback Ray Buchanan knocked away a third-down pass, and Kanell was later sacked by Smith for a 10-yard loss. By the fourth quarter, Chandler was gashing the Giants with an 18-yard pass to Martin, a 25-yard pass to former New York tight end Brian Kozlowski, and a 19-yard run, plus 15 when Gray was flagged for a late hit out of bounds. From the 1, Chandler scrambled out and ran in for a touchdown, increasing Atlanta's lead to 31–13.

On the next play from scrimmage, Kanell fumbled again on a sack by defensive back Randy Fuller, who also recovered the ball; that led to an Andersen field goal, and head coach Jim Fassel benched Kanell for Kent Graham. He finally led the Giants on a scoring drive by completing 6-of-9 passes for 64 yards before running it in himself on a quarterback draw from five yards out with 2:44 remaining. Daluiso's onside kick was recovered easily by Anderson, securing a Falcons win.

The loss dropped the Giants to 2–4, as their quarterbacks were sacked six times, and they only converted on 2-of-14 third downs; it was the Falcons' first game against them at Giants Stadium since 1982.

==== Week 7: vs. Arizona Cardinals ====
Week 7: Arizona Cardinals at New York Giants – Game summary

Quarter	1	2	3	4	Total
Cardinals	0	7	0	0	**7**
**Giants**	7	10	10	7	**34**

at Giants Stadium, East Rutherford, New Jersey

- Date: October 18
- Game time: 1:00 p.m. EDT
- Game weather: Partly sunny, 69 °F (21 °C)
- Game attendance: 70,456
- Referee: Gerry Austin
- TV announcers (Fox): Ray Bentley and Ron Pitts

Game information

**First quarter**

- NYG – Charles Way 1-yard pass from Danny Kanell (Brad Daluiso kick), 4:14. Giants 7–0. **Drive: 11 plays, 66 yards, 5:08.**

**Second quarter**

- NYG – Gary Brown 1-yard run (Brad Daluiso kick), 11:17. Giants 14–0. **Drive: 11 plays, 79 yards, 4:40.**
- ARI – Johnny McWilliams 14-yard pass from Jake Plummer (Joe Nedney kick), 7:27. Giants 14–7. **Drive: 7 plays, 58 yards, 3:50.**
- NYG – Brad Daluiso 26-yard field goal, 0:00. Giants 17–7. **Drive: 8 plays, 71 yards, 1:02.**

**Third quarter**

- NYG – Brad Daluiso 34-yard field goal, 9:27. Giants 20–7. **Drive: 6 plays, 23 yards, 2:20.**
- NYG – Chris Calloway 19-yard pass from Danny Kanell (Brad Daluiso kick), 2:01. Giants 27–7. **Drive: 9 plays, 80 yards, 4:21.**

**Fourth quarter**

- NYG – Amani Toomer 18-yard pass from Danny Kanell (Brad Daluiso kick), 6:12. Giants 34–7. **Drive: 10 plays, 52 yards, 5:23.**

**Top passers**

- ARI – Jake Plummer – 12/21, 139 yards, TD, 2 INT
- NYG – Danny Kanell – 22/36, 259 yards, 3 TD

**Top rushers**

- ARI – Mario Bates – 13 rushes, 45 yards
- NYG – Gary Brown – 24 rushes, 108 yards, TD

**Top receivers**

- ARI – Rob Moore – 4 receptions, 52 yards
- NYG – Chris Calloway – 6 receptions, 97 yards, TD

The Giants' offense awoke from their slumber with a 34-7 demolition of the Cardinals, giving them 14 wins in their last 15 home meetings against them; Danny Kanell threw for a career-high 259 yards and three touchdowns, while the defense sacked Jake Plummer seven times.

On their second drive of the game, Kanell hit Chris Calloway twice for 33 yards, while a pair of pass interference penalties on cornerback J.B. Brown—one on third down at the 13-yard line—put New York inside the 10. After a pass to Ike Hilliard, the Giants had 4th-and-Goal at the 1; Kanell rolled out and found Charles Way for a touchdown. The 5:08 possession was their longest of the season thus far.

After a sack by Robert Harris and Keith Hamilton stopped Arizona's next drive, Kanell hit Howard Cross for 22 yards; later he completed a third-down pass to David Patten, and a roughing the passer penalty on linebacker Jamir Miller put the ball on the 9. His next third-down pass was incomplete, but again the Cardinals were called for pass interference, this time on cornerback Aeneas Williams; Gary Brown ran for a score on the next play to put New York up 14–0.

The Cardinals finally responded as Plummer hit 4-of-4 passes for 49 yards, with his throw to tight end Johnny McWilliams covering the last 14 for a touchdown. But after a Giants punt, Plummer's next pass was intercepted by Jessie Armstead; however, the Giants came away empty when Brad Daluiso missed a 33-yard field goal wide left.

A 17-yard pass to wide receiver Frank Sanders helped the Cardinals cross midfield late in the first half; but Conrad Hamilton knocked away Plummer's third-down pass to Rob Moore, and they punted for a touchback. With 1:02 remaining, Kanell completed five straight passes to Patten, Hilliard and Tiki Barber, with the latter's 27-yard catch-and-run setting up a 26-yard Daluiso field goal on the final play of the half.

In the third quarter, a sack by Keith Hamilton led to an interception by Percy Ellsworth that resulted in another Daluiso field goal. Then after a Cardinals punt, the passing of Kanell and running of Brown put the Giants into the red zone; on 3rd-and-2, Kanell hit a slant to Calloway, who shook out of a tackle and beat the pursuit to the end zone to make the score 27–7.

Plummer passed Arizona into New York territory as the fourth quarter began by hitting Moore, Sanders and Eric Metcalf; but on 3rd-and-11, linebacker Scott Galyon sacked Plummer and forced a fumble, recovering it as well. Another long drive ensued, with Calloway converting on third down and Way on 4th-and-1 before Kanell hit Toomer for an 18-yard touchdown. Former Giant Dave Brown entered the game in mop-up duty and led a drive into the red zone; but he was sacked by Chad Bratzke on fourth down to quell their last scoring threat.

After coming into the game next-to-last in the NFL in rushing, the Giants got 108 yards from Brown, as they moved back to within a game of the Cowboys for first place in the NFC East.

==== Week 9: at Washington Redskins ====
Week 9: New York Giants at Washington Redskins – Game summary

Quarter	1	2	3	4	Total
Giants	7	0	7	0	**14**
**Redskins**	7	7	7	0	**21**

at Jack Kent Cooke Stadium, Landover, Maryland

- Date: November 1
- Game time: 1:00 p.m. EST
- Game weather: Mostly cloudy, 63 °F (17 °C)
- Game attendance: 67,976
- Referee: Ed Hochuli
- TV announcers (Fox): Sam Rosen and Jerry Glanville

Game information

**First quarter**

- WAS – Trent Green 1-yard run (Cary Blanchard kick), 1:55. Redskins 7–0. **Drive: 6 plays, 58 yards, 3:12.**
- NYG – David Patten 95-yard kickoff return (Brad Daluiso kick), 1:37. Tied 7–7.

**Second quarter**

- WAS – Stephen Davis 12-yard pass from Trent Green (Cary Blanchard kick), 10:37. Redskins 14–7. **Drive: 11 plays, 69 yards, 6:00.**

**Third quarter**

- WAS – Skip Hicks 4-yard run (Cary Blanchard kick), 10:15. Redskins 21–7. **Drive: 10 plays, 79 yards, 4:45.**
- NYG – Ike Hilliard 11-yard pass from Danny Kanell (Brad Daluiso kick), 1:05. Redskins 21–14. **Drive: 4 plays, 70 yards, 1:48.**

**Fourth quarter**

- No scoring plays.

**Top passers**

- NYG – Danny Kanell – 17/32, 151 yards, TD
- WAS – Trent Green – 21/31, 225 yards, TD

**Top rushers**

- NYG – Gary Brown – 12 rushes, 43 yards
- WAS – Skip Hicks – 15 rushes, 65 yards, TD

**Top receivers**

- NYG – Chris Calloway – 6 receptions, 63 yards
- WAS – Stephen Davis – 5 receptions, 65 yards, TD

After their bye week, the Giants went on the road to play the 0-7 Redskins, with a seemingly perfect chance to bump their record to 4-4; instead, they came out flat and were beaten 21–14, as the offense had more punts (11) than first downs (10).

They were set up with a short field on their second drive; but a pass from Danny Kanell to Charles Way that reached Washington's 34-yard line was negated by an illegal use of hands penalty on Greg Bishop, and the series stalled. Later in the first quarter, Trent Green hit Jamie Asher for 11 yards and fullback Stephen Davis twice out of the backfield for 40 yards. After a shovel pass to Brian Mitchell got them down to the 1, Green faked out Percy Ellsworth with a bootleg and ran in for a touchdown.

David Patten returned the ensuing kickoff 90 yards for a tying score, but Green answered by carving up the Giants, completing 6-of-7 passes for 53 yards, three times converting on third down, and the last time hitting an open Davis for a 12-yard touchdown. A 16-yard run by Terry Allen started the Redskins' next drive; but on 4th-and-2 from New York's 38, he was flagged for a false start, and they would punt.

Brad Maynard's next punt downed Washington at their own 1, and Allen was stopped on 3rd-and-1; however, Matt Turk boomed his punt 65 yards to flip the field position, and despite a 13-yard run by Tiki Barber, the Giants' two-minute drill was thwarted at the Redskins' 40.

Allen left the game at halftime with a strained calf muscle, but rookie Skip Hicks gashed the Giants for 27 yards on his first touch in the third quarter; he then carried three more times for 19 yards into the red zone. After Green hit Davis on 3rd-and-1 down to the New York 4, Hicks powered in for his first career score, putting Washington up 21–7.

Despite Michael Strahan being out with back spasms, sacks from Cedric Jones and Keith Hamilton stopped the next two drives. Then after gaining just 72 yards on their first eight drives of the game, Kanell finally hit Ike Hilliard deep for a 46-yard gain; three plays later, Hilliard beat cornerback Darrell Green to the right corner of the end zone for a touchdown, cutting the Redskins' lead to 21-14 through three.

The fourth quarter became a battle for field position, with neither offense executing, but Turk's punts being downed at New York's 7 and 1 on consecutive drives. On 3rd-and-1, Gary Brown was stopped by linebacker Ken Harvey for no gain; on another 3rd-and-1, the handoff to Way was also botched and went nowhere.

A 19-yard punt return by Mitchell and a 10-yard run by Hicks put Washington at New York's 32 with 2:37 remaining; but a tackle for a 5-yard loss by Marcus Buckley and another sack by Jones knocked Washington out of field goal range, giving the Giants the ball back at their own 20 after the two-minute warning. Kanell completed passes to Patten and Chris Calloway to get them out to the 37; but after a pair of short passes to Barber and Amani Toomer, they faced 4th-and-3 with 58 seconds left. Kanell's throw to Hilliard was broken up by rookie defensive back Tim Denton, securing Washington's first win of the season.

With the loss, the Giants dropped to 3-5 and back behind the Cardinals to third place in the NFC East; again, third-down efficiency was a problem, as they converted on just 2-of-14 attempts.

==== Week 10: at Dallas Cowboys ====
Week 10: New York Giants at Dallas Cowboys – Game summary

Quarter	1	2	3	4	Total
Giants	3	3	0	0	**6**
**Cowboys**	3	3	3	7	**16**

at Texas Stadium, Irving, Texas

- Date: November 8
- Game time: 1:00 p.m. EST/12:00 p.m. CST
- Game weather: Overcast, 52 °F (11 °C)
- Game attendance: 64,316
- Referee: Johnny Grier
- TV announcers (Fox): Pat Summerall, John Madden and Suzy Kolber

Game information

**First quarter**

- DAL – Richie Cunningham 37-yard field goal, 8:32. Cowboys 3–0. **Drive: 12 plays, 53 yards, 6:28.**
- NYG – Brad Daluiso 32-yard field goal, 3:14. Tied 3–3. **Drive: 11 plays, 67 yards, 5:18.**

**Second quarter**

- DAL – Richie Cunningham 40-yard field goal, 8:15. Cowboys 6–3. **Drive: 6 plays, 36 yards, 2:24.**
- NYG – Brad Daluiso 23-yard field goal, 1:57. Tied 6–6. **Drive: 12 plays, 79 yards, 6:18.**

**Third quarter**

- DAL – Richie Cunningham 19-yard field goal, 2:18. Cowboys 9–6. **Drive: 7 plays, 44 yards, 4:31.**

**Fourth quarter**

- DAL – Eric Bjornson 2-yard pass from Troy Aikman (Richie Cunningham kick), 8:44. Cowboys 16–6. **Drive: 11 plays, 84 yards, 6:23.**

**Top passers**

- NYG – Danny Kanell – 12/24, 139 yards
- DAL – Troy Aikman – 16/23, 161 yards, TD

**Top rushers**

- NYG – Gary Brown – 15 rushes, 119 yards
- DAL – Emmitt Smith – 29 rushes, 163 yards

**Top receivers**

- NYG – Chris Calloway – 3 receptions, 66 yards
- DAL – Ernie Mills – 3 receptions, 69 yards

Despite achieving their highest rushing yard total of the season, the Giants gave up 163 yards to Emmitt Smith and were stymied by dropped passes and questionable play calling in a 16–6 loss to the Cowboys.

On the first drive of the game, Smith carried six times for 43 yards before Dallas eventually settled for a 37-yard Richie Cunningham field goal. A 23-yard pass from Danny Kanell to Chris Calloway put the Giants across midfield, and the running of Gary Brown helped take them into the red zone; however, their drive would also stall, so Brad Daluiso kicked a 32-yard field goal.

A 19-yard punt return by Deion Sanders put the Cowboys at New York's 39-yard line; but after a 12-yard pass from Troy Aikman to Michael Irvin, Cunningham was wide right on a 38-yard field goal. However, the Giants would punt, and after a 31-yard return by Sanders, Smith rumbled 32 yards to break Tony Dorsett's franchise record of 12,036 franchise rushing yards; that led to Cunningham this time converting from 40 yards away, putting Dallas up 6–3.

Midway through the second quarter, Brown scampered for 34 yards; three plays later, Kanell hit Joe Jurevicius for a 17-yard gain down to the Cowboys 2. A pitch to Brown lost two yards, but Dallas was flagged for 12 men on the field, putting the ball on the 1. After Brown was stopped for no gain, Kanell dropped back on a play action, and was sacked from behind by safety Darren Woodson; two plays later, Daluiso kicked a short field goal, and the 6–6 score would hold up until halftime.

A 14-yard pass from Kanell to Amani Toomer on 3rd-and-9 got the Giants into Dallas territory on the initial possession of the third; two plays later, he hit Calloway downfield for 23 yards, but Calloway fumbled on the tackle, and defensive back Kenny Wheaton recovered. The defense stopped Smith for no gain on 3rd-and-1 to force a punt, but the offense went three-and-out, and a 32-yard pass from Aikman—who had briefly left the game with a sprained finger—to wide receiver Ernie Mills led to Cunningham's third field goal.

Trailing 9–6, New York got a 38-yard run by Brown out to midfield towards the end of the period; but after Tiki Barber was dropped for a 4-yard loss, Kanell's sideline pass for Toomer fell incomplete. After a punt, Aikman completed six straight passes, the biggest ones going to Billy Davis for 21 yards, Mills for 27 on 3rd-and-3, and tight end Eric Bjornson for a touchdown from the 4.

Now down by two scores with eight and a half minutes left, Kanell came out throwing to Ike Hilliard for 16 yards and Calloway for 20; but a drop by Howard Cross, a sack by defensive tackle Leon Lett, and a hurried incomplete pass forced New York to punt. Brad Maynard downed the Cowboys at the 6-yard line; but Aikman picked up a first down on a throw to Mills, and Smith ran for a pair, allowing Dallas to drain the remaining six minutes of the clock.

Brown rushed for 119 yards on 15 carries, but Kanell was just 12-of-24 for 139 yards, and the defense gave up too many broken tackles while collecting no sacks for the second time all year, both times against Dallas.

==== Week 11: vs. Green Bay Packers ====
Week 11: Green Bay Packers at New York Giants – Game summary

Quarter	1	2	3	4	Total
**Packers**	7	13	10	7	**37**
Giants	0	3	0	0	**3**

at Giants Stadium, East Rutherford, New Jersey

- Date: November 15
- Game time: 4:15 p.m. EST
- Game weather: Sunny, 59 °F (15 °C)
- Game attendance: 76,272
- Referee: Walt Coleman
- TV announcers (Fox): Sam Rosen and Jerry Glanville

Game information

**First quarter**

- GB – Tyrone Davis 1-yard pass from Brett Favre (Ryan Longwell kick), 1:28. Packers 7–0. **Drive: 11 plays, 50 yards, 5:55.**

**Second quarter**

- GB – Ryan Longwell 39-yard field goal, 8:47. Packers 10–0. **Drive: 8 plays, 28 yards, 2:39.**
- NYG – Brad Daluiso 24-yard field goal, 4:15. Packers 10–3. **Drive: 9 plays, 62 yards, 4:32.**
- GB – Tyrone Davis 60-yard pass from Brett Favre (Ryan Longwell kick), 2:45. Packers 17–3. **Drive: 3 plays, 67 yards, 1:30.**
- GB – Ryan Longwell 24-yard field goal, 0:00. Packers 20–3. **Drive: 7 plays, 23 yards, 1:20.**

**Third quarter**

- GB – Ryan Longwell 31-yard field goal, 10:22. Packers 23–3. **Drive: 7 plays, 20 yards, 4:38.**
- GB – William Henderson 7-yard run (Ryan Longwell kick), 4:13. Packers 30–3. **Drive: 11 plays, 73 yards, 5:10.**

**Fourth quarter**

- GB – Darick Holmes 2-yard run (Ryan Longwell kick), 7:37. Packers 37–3. **Drive: 14 plays, 83 yards, 7:55.**

**Top passers**

- GB – Brett Favre – 21/33, 267 yards, 2 TD
- NYG – Danny Kanell – 8/20, 88 yards, 2 INT

**Top rushers**

- GB – Darick Holmes – 27 rushes, 111 yards, TD
- NYG – Gary Brown – 8 rushes, 21 yards

**Top receivers**

- GB – Tyrone Davis – 3 receptions, 83 yards, 2 TD
- NYG – Ike Hilliard – 3 receptions, 48 yards

Against the two-time defending NFC Champion Packers, the Giants were dominated in all phases of the game in front of their home crowd, giving up huge advantages in first downs (24–9), total yards (433–127) and time of possession (39:43-20:17) as they fell 37–3, the biggest road win for Green Bay since 1962.

New York's first drive was a three-and-out that saw Danny Kanell miss an open Chris Calloway and then get sacked by Reggie White. They forced a punt and picked up a pair of first downs with Charles Way, but stalled before reaching midfield; later in the first quarter, Brett Favre completed passes to wide receivers Antonio Freeman and Robert Brooks and tight end Mark Chmura, as the Packers reached New York's 2-yard line. On 3rd-and-Goal, Percy Ellsworth was late going to match up with tight end Tyrone Davis, who easily outjumped Marcus Buckley for a touchdown.

After a three-and-out, Favre hit Freeman, Davis and Brooks again on three straight passes; but he was later stuffed for no gain on 3rd-and-inches, and Ryan Longwell missed wide left on a 39-yard field goal. However, Kanell was intercepted by safety LeRoy Butler on the next play, and Longwell was good on his next 39-yard try; Kanell finally found some success on the ensuing drive, completing to Ike Hilliard twice for 40 yards and Howard Cross for 12, but bogged down in the red zone, leading to a 24-yard Brad Daluiso field goal.

Three plays later, Favre fired a pass to Davis that beat the diving attempt of Tito Wooten, and he outraced Ellsworth to go 60 yards for a touchdown. With less than two minutes remaining in the first half, Gary Brown ran for a first down on 3rd-and-1; but Kanell was sacked on consecutive plays by defensive ends Vonnie Holliday and White, getting stripped of the ball, which was recovered by Keith McKenzie. That led to Longwell's second field goal, putting the Packers up 20–3 at halftime.

Roell Preston then returned the opening kickoff of the third quarter 66 yards to the Giants 33; the Packers mainly ran the ball with running backs Raymont Harris and Darick Holmes—both playing for the injured Dorsey Levens—before Longwell was good from 31 yards out. After a three-and-out, Favre completed passes to Freeman and rookie Corey Bradford to reach New York's 32; then Holmes touched the ball five straight times for 25 yards before fullback William Henderson covered the last seven for a score.

Three plays later, Kanell was intercepted again by Butler; trailing 30–3, he was then benched for Kent Graham, who was sacked on his second pass attempt by Holiday. As the fourth quarter began, Green Bay went on a 14-play, 83-yard drive in almost eight minutes, with Holmes carrying 11 times for 48 yards, diving in from the 2 to finish the blowout.

Holmes rushed for 111 yards in his first action as a Packer, while Kanell was just 8-of-20 for 88 yards, as the Giants fell to 3–7, only a game ahead of the Redskins and Eagles for last place in the NFC East.

==== Week 12: vs. Philadelphia Eagles ====
Week 12: Philadelphia Eagles at New York Giants – Game summary

Quarter	1	2	3	4	Total
Eagles	0	0	0	0	**0**
**Giants**	3	0	7	10	**20**

at Giants Stadium, East Rutherford, New Jersey

- Date: November 22
- Game time: 1:00 p.m. EST
- Game weather: Sunny, 45 °F (7 °C)
- Game attendance: 65,763
- Referee: Bill Carollo
- TV announcers (Fox): Kenny Albert and Tim Green

Game information

**First quarter**

- NYG – Brad Daluiso 40-yard field goal, 5:01. Giants 3–0. **Drive: 8 plays, 46 yards, 3:54.**

**Second quarter**

- No scoring plays.

**Third quarter**

- NYG – Gary Brown 4-yard run (Brad Daluiso kick), 2:30. Giants 10–0. **Drive: 9 plays, 49 yards, 5:14.**

**Fourth quarter**

- NYG – Brad Daluiso 49-yard field goal, 11:04. Giants 13–0. **Drive: 11 plays, 29 yards, 5:30.**
- NYG – Tiki Barber 8-yard pass from Kent Graham (Brad Daluiso kick), 2:09. Giants 20–0. **Drive: 6 plays, 36 yards, 2:37.**

**Top passers**

- PHI – Bobby Hoying – 14/28, 121 yards, 2 INT
- NYG – Kent Graham – 10/21, 153 yards, TD, INT

**Top rushers**

- PHI – Duce Staley – 14 rushes, 52 yards
- NYG – Gary Brown – 27 rushes, 96 yards, TD

**Top receivers**

- PHI – Duce Staley – 4 receptions, 49 yards
- NYG – Joe Jurevicius – 2 receptions, 65 yards

Prior to their matchup with the Eagles, Jim Fassel announced that Kent Graham—a member of the Giants from 1992 to 1994—would start in place of the struggling Danny Kanell. In a battle of two of the league's worst offenses, the Giants emerged with a 20–0 victory to snap their three-game losing streak, as the defense sacked quarterback Bobby Hoying six times.

On New York's second drive, Graham completed his first two passes to Chris Calloway for 22 yards and Ike Hilliard for 15. However, he fumbled the snap from Lance Scott two plays later; Scott recovered it, but they had to settle for a 40-yard Brad Daluiso field goal. Hoying answered by passing and running Philadelphia into Giants' territory; but after running back Charlie Garner was stopped on 3rd-and-1, Chris Boniol came up short on a 44-yard field goal.

It was still 3-0 late in the second quarter, as the Giants failed to capitalize on a roughing the kicker penalty on a Brad Maynard punt, and the Eagles had a 32-yard catch-and-run by tight end Jason Dunn called back by a holding penalty. But from his own 21-yard line with just over a minute left, Graham hit Joe Jurevicius on a deep pass, and he appeared on his way for a touchdown, but tripped and fell at the Eagles' 20 for a 59-yard gain. Then three plays later, Graham's pass was tipped and intercepted by safety Brian Dawkins to end the drive.

Midway through the third, the Eagles were stymied near midfield when Michael Strahan and Tito Wooten sacked Hoying on consecutive plays. The running of Gary Brown got New York into Philadelphia territory; then on 3rd-and-13, Graham found Amani Toomer for 14 yards and a first down. After a 10-yard run by Charles Way, Brown finished it off from the 4 for the Giants' first touchdown in 12 quarters.

After a Philadelphia three-and-out, the Giants ran the ball nine straight times with Brown, Graham and Way for 29 yards, eventually kicking a 49-yard field goal to extend their lead to 13-0 early in the fourth. From their own 20, Hoying mounted a drive by hitting wide receiver Dietrich Jells and running back Duce Staley for 16 yards apiece, the latter compounded by a facemask personal foul on Wooten. But after reaching the 11-yard line, Hoying was pressured by Strahan and threw off his back foot, and the pass was picked off in the end zone by Phillippi Sparks with just under seven minutes left.

The Giants went three-and-out, but on the first play of the ensuing drive, Hoying was intercepted again by Sparks. Three plays later, Graham hit Toomer on a crossing route for a 25-yard gain, and then another three plays later, he found Tiki Barber for an 8-yard touchdown with 2:09 to go; the Eagles failed to cross midfield on their last drive, preserving New York's first shutout since 1990 and the Eagles' third against them of the year.

Sparks's two interceptions earned him NFC Defensive Player of the Week honors, while Jessie Armstead—playing through a sprained ankle all season—had two of the Giants' six sacks, and also collected 10 tackles.

==== Week 13: at San Francisco 49ers ====
Week 13: New York Giants at San Francisco 49ers – Game summary

Quarter	1	2	3	4	Total
Giants	7	0	0	0	**7**
**49ers**	7	7	7	10	**31**

at 3Com Park, San Francisco, California

- Date: November 30
- Game time: 8:20 p.m. EST/5:20 p.m. PST
- Game weather: Light rain, 55 °F (13 °C)
- Game attendance: 68,212
- Referee: Tony Corrente
- TV announcers (ABC): Al Michaels, Dan Dierdorf, Boomer Esiason and Lesley Visser

Game information

**First quarter**

- NYG – Gary Brown 11-yard run (Brad Daluiso kick), 9:21. Giants 7–0. **Drive: 4 plays, 80 yards, 1:32.**
- SF – Terrell Owens 79-yard pass from Steve Young (Wade Richey kick), 2:39. Tied 7–7. **Drive: 2 plays, 79 yards, 0:17.**

**Second quarter**

- SF – Irv Smith 1-yard pass from Steve Young (Wade Richey kick), 0:28. 49ers 14–7. **Drive: 13 plays, 90 yards, 5:44.**

**Third quarter**

- SF – Terry Kirby 7-yard run (Wade Richey kick), 7:01. 49ers 21–7. **Drive: 5 plays, 37 yards, 2:52.**

**Fourth quarter**

- SF – Wade Richey 39-yard field goal, 10:07. 49ers 24–7. **Drive: 7 plays, 47 yards, 3:01.**
- SF – Garrison Hearst 70-yard run (Wade Richey kick), 3:09. 49ers 31–7. **Drive: 3 plays, 79 yards, 1:02.**

**Top passers**

- NYG – Kent Graham – 21/41, 237 yards, INT
- SF – Steve Young – 19/33, 253 yards, 2 TD

**Top rushers**

- NYG – Gary Brown – 15 rushes, 56 yards, TD
- SF – Garrison Hearst – 20 rushes, 166 yards, TD

**Top receivers**

- NYG – Ike Hilliard – 6 receptions, 141 yards
- SF – Terrell Owens – 5 receptions, 140 yards, TD

On a rainy Monday Night Football bout with the 49ers, the Giants squandered numerous scoring opportunities, as San Francisco pulled away late to a 31–7 win, knocking New York down to 4–8.

After the 49ers' first drive stalled just outside field goal range, Kent Graham struck gold on his first play by hitting Ike Hilliard deep for 48 yards; from there, the running of Gary Brown and Charles Way picked up the rest of the way, with the former running for an 11-yard touchdown. A sack by Chad Bratzke helped kill the next possession, but on 3rd-and-9, Graham was sacked by defensive end Roy Barker and fumbled, with linebacker Ken Norton Jr. recovering. But the Giants' defense held, and Wade Richey's 41-yard field goal missed wide left.

However, after a New York three-and-out, Steve Young threw a quick screen to Terrell Owens, who shook off a tackle by Conrad Hamilton, avoided a diving Sam Garnes, and sprinted 79 yards for a score. On the ensuing drive, Graham hit rookie tight end Andy Haase for a 27-yard gain; but three plays later, he overthrew a pass for Chris Calloway and was intercepted by safety Tim McDonald.

In the second quarter, a 26-yard run by Garrison Hearst put the 49ers at New York's 25-yard line; but it led to Richey missing another field goal, this time to the right. But the Giants punted, and Young led a 13-play, 90-yard drive by hitting Owens for 17 yards, wide receiver Mark Harris for 25, J. J. Stokes for 15, and scrambling for nine on 3rd-and-3. From the 1, he found wide open tight end Irv Smith for a touchdown, putting San Francisco up 14–7 at halftime.

The defensive pressure of Michael Strahan and defensive tackle Bryant Young stopped the next few drives, but a 26-yard punt return by rookie R. W. McQuarters—coupled with Shaun Williams getting flagged for a late hit—gave the 49ers a short field, resulting in running back Terry Kirby carrying three straight times for 20 yards, covering the last seven for a score.

Faced with 3rd-and-20 on their next drive, Graham hit Hilliard for a 50-yard gain all the way to San Francisco's 31; but the drive stalled, and Brad Daluiso missed a 43-yard field goal wide left. As the game moved into the fourth quarter, a 21-yard pass to Hilliard and a 13-yard run by Way helped take the Giants into the red zone; but Daluiso had his next field goal attempt blocked by Junior Bryant.

Steve Young picked up 37 yards on a pair of scramble runs to New York's 22; a holding on Smith and a sack by Strahan left them facing 3rd-and-33, but a 24-yard catch by Owens gave Richey a chance to convert a 39-yard field goal, making the score 24–7.

With 10 minutes left, Graham drove the Giants into the red zone by completing passes to Calloway and Hilliard, while Brown picked up a pair of 3rd-and-1s. But after reaching the 9-yard line, Graham's passes to Hilliard and Howard Cross lost yardage; then after giving up another five via delay of game, his fourth-down fling for Joe Jurevicius sailed out of the end zone. Three plays later, Hearst broke through the middle and dashed 79 yards for a touchdown to put the game away.

Hilliard had a career night with 6 catches for 141 yards, but the defense was gashed for 237 rushing yards; however, the game became somewhat overshadowed by a devastating injury to Bryant Young, who suffered a compound fracture of his right leg while making a fourth-quarter tackle.

==== Week 14: at Arizona Cardinals ====
Week 14: New York Giants at Arizona Cardinals – Game summary

Quarter	1	2	3	4	Total
**Giants**	7	3	10	3	**23**
Cardinals	14	3	0	2	**19**

at Sun Devil Stadium, Tempe, Arizona

- Date: December 6
- Game time: 4:05 p.m. EST/2:05 p.m. MST
- Game weather: Overcast, 41 °F (5 °C)
- Game attendance: 46,128
- Referee: Tom White
- TV announcers (Fox): Sam Rosen and Jerry Glanville

Game information

**First quarter**

- ARI – Adrian Murrell 20-yard pass from Jake Plummer (Chris Jacke kick), 3:50. Cardinals 7–0. **Drive: 11 plays, 80 yards, 5:23.**
- NYG – Tiki Barber 87-yard pass from Kent Graham (Brad Daluiso kick), 2:42. Tied 7–7. **Drive: 3 plays, 78 yards, 1:08.**
- ARI – Adrian Murrell 8-yard run (Chris Jacke kick), 1:15. Cardinals 14–7. **Drive: 4 plays, 59 yards, 1:27.**

**Second quarter**

- ARI – Chris Jacke 21-yard field goal, 11:15. Cardinals 17–7. **Drive: 7 plays, 40 yards, 3:45.**
- NYG – Brad Daluiso 51-yard field goal, 0:00. Cardinals 17–10. **Drive: 3 plays, 12 yards, 0:21.**

**Third quarter**

- NYG – Brad Daluiso 28-yard field goal, 9:09. Cardinals 17–13. **Drive: 11 plays, 63 yards, 4:45.**
- NYG – Charles Way 8-yard run (Brad Daluiso kick), 4:08. Giants 20–17. **Drive: 7 plays, 36 yards, 3:20.**

**Fourth quarter**

- NYG – Brad Daluiso 45-yard field goal, 11:34. Giants 23–17. **Drive: 11 plays, 52 yards, 5:05.**
- ARI – Brad Maynard out of bounds in the end zone for a safety, 0:17.

**Top passers**

- NYG – Kent Graham – 8/23, 144 yards, TD, 2 INT
- ARI – Jake Plummer – 18/40, 263 yards, TD, 2 INT

**Top rushers**

- NYG – Gary Brown – 25 rushes, 124 yards
- ARI – Adrian Murrell – 16 rushes, 53 yards, TD

**Top receivers**

- NYG – Tiki Barber – 2 receptions, 91 yards, TD
- ARI – Larry Centers – 5 receptions, 68 yards

The coldest home game in Cardinals history saw the Giants use a 200-yard team rushing attack and timely defensive stops to secure a season sweep of Arizona to keep their slim playoff hopes alive.

On their second drive of the game, Jake Plummer passed and ran the Cardinals down to New York's 20-yard line; on 3rd-and-5, he flipped it to running back Adrian Murrell on a shovel pass, and he ran all the way for a touchdown. A pair of false starts left the Giants with 3rd-and-19 from their own 13; Kent Graham tossed a screen pass out to Tiki Barber, who got downfield blocks from Greg Bishop and right guard Ron Stone, and went 87 yards for a score, the team's longest play from scrimmage since Rich Houston in 1972.

However, Plummer turned his own screen pass to fullback Larry Centers into a 54-yard gain three plays later; then Murrell ran through Tito Wooten and Percy Ellsworth for his second touchdown to put Arizona up 14–7. On the ensuing drive, a third-down catch by Chris Calloway was negated by an illegal motion penalty on Barber, and Sam Garnes was flagged for a late hit on the ensuing punt, giving the Cardinals a short field. A 27-yard pass to tight end Chris Gedney put them at the 4 before New York's defense held them to a 21-yard Chris Jacke field goal.

The Giants' passing game struggled, as Graham was intercepted by cornerback Corey Chavous and another third-down catch was nullified by penalty, this time a holding on left tackle Roman Oben. In the final minute of the first half, a 28-yard run by Murrell got Arizona off their own 5; but on the next play, Shaun Williams made a diving interception on a pass for Frank Sanders. A 12-yard throw to Calloway led to Brad Daluiso kicking a 51-yard field goal, cutting the Cardinals' lead to 17–10.

In the third quarter, New York turned to their running game against Arizona's injured defense, as Gary Brown and Charles Way picked up yards, with the latter also coming up huge by recovering a Howard Cross fumble. A 16-yard catch by Calloway also helped set up another Daluiso field goal; then on the ensuing drive, Plummer was stripped from behind by Cedric Jones, who also recovered at Arizona's 36.

With a short field, the Giants handed off on seven straight plays to Brown and Way, with the latter sweeping outside for the go-ahead 8-yard score. Just two plays later, however, Plummer hit Rob Moore deep for 38 yards, beating Conrad Hamilton on the play down to the 1-yard line. But Michael Strahan and Corey Widmer stopped Mario Bates and Plummer for losses, and his third-down pass was intercepted by Jeremy Lincoln in the end zone.

As the fourth quarter began, New York continued with their backs, as Way ran for 25 yards and Brown for 22 on four carries each; a 45-yard Daluiso field goal eventually put the Giants up 23–17. But after a Cardinals punt, Graham's pass for Ike Hilliard was intercepted by defensive back J. J. McCleskey, giving Arizona the ball at the Giants' 40 with seven and a half minutes left.

After a 30-yard run by Plummer on a draw was called back for a penalty, he hit a series of short passes to Gedney and Eric Metcalf to reach the red zone. He was sacked by Chad Bratzke on third down, but Williams was called for illegal use of hands, putting the ball at the 13. Two short Murrell runs and an incomplete pass to Moore brought up 4th-and-3 at the two-minute warning; Plummer was rushed and shot-putted a pass to Sanders, but it was knocked down by Widmer in the end zone.

The Giants ran the ball three times with Brown, forcing Arizona to burn their only remaining time-out; then they chose to let Brad Maynard run out of the end zone for a safety so he wouldn't have to kick from his own end zone for field position. With just 11 seconds to go after the free kick, Plummer completed a short pass to Sanders up to the 36, but his Hail Mary heave fell incomplete, giving New York a 23–19 win.

Brown ran for a season-high 124 yards, while Way added 60, although Graham completed just 8-of-23 passes. With the win, the Giants upped their record to 5-8 and guaranteed a tiebreaker over Arizona, while remaining just one game behind the Cardinals, Buccaneers and Saints for the third and final Wild Card spot in the NFC.

==== Week 15: vs. Denver Broncos ====
Week 15: Denver Broncos at New York Giants – Game summary

Quarter	1	2	3	4	Total
Broncos	3	3	3	7	**16**
**Giants**	3	7	0	10	**20**

at Giants Stadium, East Rutherford, New Jersey

- Date: December 13
- Game time: 1:00 p.m. EST
- Game weather: Partly cloudy, 41 °F (5 °C)
- Game attendance: 72,336
- Referee: Mike Carey
- TV announcers (CBS): Greg Gumbel, Phil Simms and Armen Keteyian

Game information

**First quarter**

- DEN – Jason Elam 24-yard field goal, 7:01. Broncos 3–0. **Drive: 14 plays, 67 yards, 7:59.**
- NYG – Brad Daluiso 36-yard field goal, 2:32. Tied 3–3. **Drive: 8 plays, 46 yards, 4:29.**

**Second quarter**

- DEN – Jason Elam 38-yard field goal, 10:31. Broncos 6–3. **Drive: 12 plays, 62 yards, 7:01.**
- NYG – Tiki Barber 21-yard pass from Kent Graham (Brad Daluiso kick), 0:45. Giants 10–6. **Drive: 15 plays, 80 yards, 5:25.**

**Third quarter**

- DEN – Jason Elam 30-yard field goal, 1:48. Giants 10–9. **Drive: 18 plays, 77 yards, 7:00.**

**Fourth quarter**

- NYG – Brad Daluiso 19-yard field goal, 7:36. Giants 13–9. **Drive: 8 plays, 62 yards, 5:08.**
- DEN – Terrell Davis 27-yard run (Jason Elam kick), 4:08. Broncos 16–13. **Drive: 7 plays, 76 yards, 3:28.**
- NYG – Amani Toomer 37-yard pass from Kent Graham (Brad Daluiso kick), 0:48. Giants 20–16. **Drive: 6 plays, 86 yards, 1:01.**

**Top passers**

- DEN – John Elway – 19/36, 180 yards, INT
- NYG – Kent Graham – 21/33, 265 yards, 2 TD

**Top rushers**

- DEN – Terrell Davis – 28 rushes, 147 yards, TD
- NYG – Gary Brown – 18 rushes, 112 yards

**Top receivers**

- DEN – Willie Green – 6 receptions, 69 yards
- NYG – Chris Calloway – 5 receptions, 99 yards

The defending champion Broncos swaggered into Giants Stadium with a 13–0 record, and riding an 18-game winning streak going back to the previous season, which tied an NFL record. But Jim Fassel—who had been John Elway's offensive coordinator at Stanford University and for two years in Denver—and the Giants stunned the Broncos 20–16 on a last-minute touchdown pass from Kent Graham to Amani Toomer to end Denver's bid for a perfect season.

Elway completed six of his first seven passes for 48 yards, converting on third-downs to Rod Smith and Shannon Sharpe, although Tito Wooten jarred one pass for the latter loose that would've gone for a big gain. He and Corey Widmer then combined to deflect an end zone pass, forcing a 24-yard Jason Elam field goal after an eight-minute drive. On the ensuing possession, Graham completed his first pass to Ike Hilliard for 13 yards, and Gary Brown ran for 19 to set up a Brad Daluiso field goal.

Denver answered with another long drive, this time by giving the ball to Terrell Davis five times for 33 yards, including a 4th-and-1 conversion from New York's 26-yard line; but after an illegal block in the back on left tackle Tony Jones, the drive stalled, and Elam kicked his second field goal.

The next two drives started promising but ended in sacks of Graham by defensive tackles Trevor Pryce and Maa Tanuvasa and Elway by Conrad Hamilton. Beginning at his own 20 with six minutes left in the first half, Graham completed passes to Joe Jurevicius and Chris Calloway for first downs, three times on third down and once on 3rd-and-13. Then on 3rd-and-8 from the 21, Graham hit Tiki Barber out of the backfield, where he beat linebacker John Mobley down the left sideline for a touchdown to give New York a 10–6 halftime lead.

Graham converted another pair of third-down passes to Hilliard and David Patten on the opening series of the third quarter, but the Giants would eventually punt; both teams went three-and-out, with Hamilton knocking away a pass for wide receiver Willie Green, and Charles Way dropping a third-down pass. But with a mixture of runs by Davis and passes to Green and fullback Howard Griffith, Denver went on an 18-play, 77-yard drive; however, New York's defense held them to Elam's third field goal.

On the first play of the fourth, Graham hit an open Hilliard for a first down on 3rd-and-5; but as he turned upfield, Hilliard dropped the ball, and it was ruled a fumble recovered by Mobley at the Broncos' 47. Elway scrambled for a first down, but was then sacked by Michael Strahan and intercepted by Shaun Williams.

One play later, Brown rumbled 45 yards down to Denver's 18-yard line; after two more runs by Brown, Graham scrambled for a first down. But two plays later, Brown fumbled as he fought towards the goal line and linebacker Bill Romanowski recovered; however, cornerback Ray Crockett was offsides, negating the play. Both Way and Brown failed to score from inside the 2, so Daluiso kicked a chip shot field goal, making the score 13–9.

Midway through the period, Davis ran for 18 yards, and then Elway completed passes to Smith and Sharpe for first downs to get them to New York's 27; then Davis broke free down the left sideline for a touchdown, putting the Broncos up 16–13 with 4:08 to go. Two plays from scrimmage later, Graham drew Denver offsides and then threw deep to Calloway with a free play, completing it for a 36-yard gain; but immediately after, Brown had the ball ripped out by safety Tyrone Braxton and recovered by Romanowski, giving the Broncos the ball back with 3:36 left.

After a run by Davis and an offsides call on Jessie Armstead, Denver had a 2nd-and-1; but Armstead dropped Davis for a 2-yard loss, and then Griffith—on a play they ran earlier that had worked for 16 yards—was hit in the backfield by Strahan and eventually tackled by Marcus Buckley for a loss of five. Tom Rouen's ensuing punt was short, but skipped past Toomer until he handled it and was immediately tackled at the 14.

With no time-outs and 1:49 remaining, Graham completed a pass to Calloway for 15 yards, and then scrambled up the middle for 23 to Denver's 48-yard line. Three plays later, he found Jurevicius for 11 yards, stopping the clock out of bounds with 57 seconds to go. On first down, Graham launched a deep pass to Toomer, who made the catch over defensive back Tito Paul as he fell in and out of the end zone. Back Judge Kirk Dornan called it a touchdown, but Field Judge David Warden called it incomplete; the two officials conferred, and then correctly awarded Toomer the touchdown, putting the Giants ahead 20–16 with 48 seconds left.

Daluiso's squib kickoff was returned by Keith Burns to the 42; after an incomplete pass, Elway completed one to Smith, who faked a lateral to Davis and then ran for a 17-yard gain. Elway spiked the ball to stop the clock, but was then sacked by Chad Bratzke back at the 50, forcing Denver to use their last time-out with 12 seconds remaining. Elway completed a pass to Green at the right sideline, where he got out of bounds after a 20-yard gain. With five seconds left, Elway dropped back and launched a Hail Mary pass into the end zone, where it was knocked away by a host of Giant defenders, securing New York's upset win as 13-point underdogs.

Graham—who reportedly had been in danger of losing his starting job to Danny Kanell—was named NFC Offensive Player of the Week for his heroics, while the Giants—ranked last in the NFL in third-down conversion percentage—were 9-of-15 on the day in one of the great games in their history.

==== Week 16: vs. Kansas City Chiefs ====
Week 16: Kansas City Chiefs at New York Giants – Game summary

Quarter	1	2	3	4	Total
Chiefs	0	0	7	0	**7**
**Giants**	14	7	7	0	**28**

at Giants Stadium, East Rutherford, New Jersey

- Date: December 20
- Game time: 1:00 p.m. EST
- Game weather: Overcast, 49 °F (9 °C)
- Game attendance: 66,040
- Referee: Ron Winter
- TV announcers (CBS): Kevin Harlan and Sam Wyche

Game information

**First quarter**

- NYG – Percy Ellsworth 43-yard interception return (Brad Daluiso kick), 13:46. Giants 7–0.
- NYG – Amani Toomer 12-yard pass from Kent Graham (Brad Daluiso kick), 6:21. Giants 14–0. **Drive: 12 plays, 83 yards, 5:26.**

**Second quarter**

- NYG – Gary Brown 1-yard run (Brad Daluiso kick), 3:46. Giants 21–0. **Drive: 8 plays, 44 yards, 2:53.**

**Third quarter**

- NYG – Kent Graham 6-yard run (Brad Daluiso kick), 6:30. Giants 28–0. **Drive: 7 plays, 67 yards, 3:56.**
- KC – Tony Gonzalez 4-yard pass from Elvis Grbac (Pete Stoyanovich kick), 2:41. Giants 28–7. **Drive: 7 plays, 80 yards, 3:49.**

**Fourth quarter**

- No scoring plays.

**Top passers**

- KC – Elvis Grbac – 11/20, 160 yards, TD, 2 INT
- NYG – Kent Graham – 16/33, 167 yards, TD

**Top rushers**

- KC – Bam Morris – 13 rushes, 42 yards
- NYG – Gary Brown – 25 rushes, 103 yards, TD

**Top receivers**

- KC – Derrick Alexander – 6 receptions, 97 yards
- NYG – Amani Toomer – 4 receptions, 49 yards, TD

In the 1,000th regular season game in franchise history, the Giants handled the Chiefs 28–7, and coupled with losses by the Buccaneers and Saints, kept their playoff hopes alive going into the final week.

On the first play of the game, Rich Gannon was sacked by Chad Bratzke and appeared to fumble the ball to Keith Hamilton, but was ruled down by contact; it didn't matter, as he was shaken up and briefly replaced by Elvis Grbac, whose first pass was intercepted off a deflection by Percy Ellsworth, who took it 43 yards for an early touchdown.

Gannon re-entered the game, but Kansas City punted after one first down on their next drive, and New York ran the ball five times with Gary Brown for 38 yards before Kent Graham shook off a blitz and found Amani Toomer in the corner of the end zone for a 12-yard touchdown, the pair's first scoring hookup since their last-minute win over the Broncos the previous week.

The next two drives had plays that symbolized the teams' previous fortunes, as Gannon tripped over right guard Will Shields as he dropped back and went down, while Graham had a pass tipped right back to him, and he took it for a 16-yard gain. Midway through the second quarter, the Chiefs went for it on 4th-and-1 from their own 44-yard line, but running back Bam Morris was stopped short by Jessie Armstead.

A 32-yard catch-and-run by Ike Hilliard, coupled with a defensive holding penalty against cornerback James Hasty on 3rd-and-19, led to Brown punching it in from the 1, putting the Giants up 21–0. They had another chance to score late in the first half when Gannon was intercepted by Phillippi Sparks; but after getting down to the 9, Roman Oben was flagged for unsportsmanlike conduct, and the 15-yard loss led to Brad Daluiso missing a 41-yard field goal wide left in the final seconds.

Kansas City's first two drives of the third quarter ended with an Ellsworth interception—caught out of bounds but ruled in—and a sack by Michael Strahan, which also took Gannon out of the game for good. On the ensuing series, Tiki Barber ran for 23 yards on 2nd-and-18, and Graham's long throw for Chris Calloway drew a pass interference on cornerback Mark McMillian, putting New York in the red zone. After a 12-yard run by Charles Way, Graham took it in himself, extending the Giants' lead to 28–0.

Grbac finally led a sustained Chiefs drive, hitting wide receiver Andre Rison for a 39-yard catch-and-run; five plays later, he found Tony Gonzalez for a 4-yard touchdown. As the game moved into the fourth, Graham completed passes to Toomer, Way and Calloway for first downs to put them at Kansas City's 20; but after a sack by Hasty, Daluiso missed another kick wide left.

On the ensuing drive, Grbac drove the Chiefs downfield with passes to Rison, Gonzalez and Derrick Alexander; but on third down from the 28, he was intercepted by Armstead, and their last scoring threat of the game was stopped on downs in the red zone.

Ellsworth's two interceptions earned him NFC Defensive Player of the Week honors, while Brown rushed for 103 yards to put him on the cusp of 1,000 for the season, as the Giants moved to 7–8, snapping Kansas City's 11-game winning streak against NFC opponents.

==== Week 17: at Philadelphia Eagles ====
Week 17: New York Giants at Philadelphia Eagles – Game summary

Quarter	1	2	3	4	Total
**Giants**	3	3	7	7	**20**
Eagles	0	10	0	0	**10**

at Veterans Stadium, Philadelphia, Pennsylvania

- Date: December 27
- Game time: 4:05 p.m. EST
- Game weather: Overcast, 37 °F (3 °C)
- Game attendance: 66,596
- Referee: Gerry Austin
- TV announcers (Fox): Kenny Albert and Tim Green

Game information

**First quarter**

- NYG – Brad Daluiso 43-yard field goal, 0:34. Giants 3–0. **Drive: 11 plays, 45 yards, 6:06.**

**Second quarter**

- PHI – Duce Staley 64-yard run (Chris Boniol kick), 14:16. Eagles 7–3. **Drive: 3 plays, 73 yards, 1:18.**
- NYG – Brad Daluiso 33-yard field goal, 7:08. Eagles 7–6. **Drive: 14 plays, 45 yards, 7:08.**
- PHI – Chris Boniol 19-yard field goal, 0:35. Eagles 10–6. **Drive: 11 plays, 72 yards, 6:33.**

**Third quarter**

- NYG – Chris Calloway 5-yard pass from Kent Graham (Brad Daluiso kick), 0:28. Giants 13–10. **Drive: 12 plays, 77 yards, 5:22.**

**Fourth quarter**

- NYG – Chris Calloway 18-yard pass from Kent Graham (Brad Daluiso kick), 5:42. Giants 20–10. **Drive: 11 plays, 81 yards, 6:34.**

**Top passers**

- NYG – Kent Graham – 15/26, 133 yards, 2 TD
- PHI – Koy Detmer – 13/27, 151 yards, INT

**Top rushers**

- NYG – Gary Brown – 25 rushes, 112 yards
- PHI – Duce Staley – 16 rushes, 97 yards, TD

**Top receivers**

- NYG – Chris Calloway – 5 receptions, 56 yards, 2 TD
- PHI – Dietrich Jells – 1 reception, 37 yards

Heading into Week 17, the Giants needed a win over the Eagles, plus a loss by the Buccaneers in an earlier game and a loss by the Cardinals in a later game, to clinch the last Wild Card spot in the NFC Playoffs. But before kickoff in Philadelphia, a 35-0 Tampa Bay win over the Bengals eliminated New York from playoff contention; the disheartened Giants were sluggish in the first half, but eventually came back to defeat the Eagles 20–10.

The Eagles—3-12 and starting their third quarterback in Koy Detmer—drove into New York territory on their first possession on an 18-yard pass to Irving Fryar, planning retirement after the game; but the drive stalled on fourth down at the Giants' 33-yard line. After a series of three-and-outs, New York got chunk running plays from Gary Brown and Charles Way, plus a third-down conversion pass from Kent Graham to Ike Hilliard; it resulted in a 43-yard Brad Daluiso field goal.

On the second play of the second quarter, Duce Staley broke loose for a 64-yard touchdown run; the Giants responded by dinking and dunking down the field with short runs and passes before eventually settling for another Daluiso field goal. Philadelphia ran the ball eight times on their next drive, benefitting from a face mask penalty on Marcus Buckley and a 25-yard pass from Detmer to wide receiver Jeff Graham; but on 3rd-and-2 from New York's 3, Staley was stopped short, so they kicked a Chris Boniol field goal just before halftime.

It was still a 10–6 game midway through the third before a pair of sacks by Jessie Armstead and Michael Strahan—the latter's 15th of the year and the team's league-high 54th—led to the Giants driving 77 yards in 12 plays, as a 20-yard scamper by Way and a 21-yard pass to Chris Calloway led to Kent Graham's third-down pass for Hilliard bouncing off him and caught by Calloway for a go-ahead touchdown.

A 54-yard kickoff return by Allen Rossum gave Philadelphia a short field to begin the fourth quarter; but after Detmer converted on a fourth-down pass to fullback Kevin Turner, he was intercepted by Sam Garnes three plays later. On the ensuing drive, Brown carried six times for 40 yards before Graham found Calloway in the corner of the end zone for his second touchdown, extending New York's lead to 20–10 with just under six minutes remaining.

Detmer led the Eagles into the red zone on a 37-yard pass to Dietrich Jells and even a short pass to tackle eligible Bubba Miller. But after rookie running back Corey Walker was tackled by Conrad Hamilton for a loss on 3rd-and-2 from the 7-yard line, Detmer's pass for Fryar fell incomplete, and a first-down run by Brown let the Giants run out the clock.

Brown—who had just signed a new four-year contract—rushed for 112 yards to give him his sixth 100-yard game of the season and 1,063 rushing yards total, the first Giant to eclipse 1,000 yards since Rodney Hampton in 1995. Despite falling short of the postseason after last year's division title, New York closed their 8-8 campaign by winning five of their last six games.

=== Standings ===
NFC East
	W	L	T	PCT	PF	PA	STK
^{(3)} Dallas Cowboys	10	6	0	.625	381	275	W2
^{(6)} Arizona Cardinals	9	7	0	.563	325	378	W3
New York Giants	8	8	0	.500	287	309	W4
Washington Redskins	6	10	0	.375	319	421	L1
Philadelphia Eagles	3	13	0	.188	161	344	L3

== See also ==
- List of New York Giants seasons
