= Percy Ellsworth =

American football player (born 1974)

No. 43
- Position: Safety

Personal information
- Born: October 19, 1974 (age 52); Drewryville, Virginia, U.S.
- Listed height: 6 ft 2 in (1.88 m)
- Listed weight: 225 lb (102 kg)

Career information
- High school: Southampton (Courtland, Virginia)
- College: Virginia
- NFL draft: 1996: undrafted

Career history
- New York Giants (1996–1999); Cleveland Browns (2000–2001)

Awards and highlights
- First-team All-American (1995); First-team All-ACC (1995)

Career NFL statistics
- Tackles: 318
- Interceptions: 20
- Fumble recoveries: 5
- Stats at Pro Football Reference

Percy Daniel Ellsworth III (born October 19, 1974) is an American former professional football player who was a safety in the National Football League (NFL) for the New York Giants and Cleveland Browns. Ellsworth played college football for the Virginia Cavaliers before joining the Giants as an undrafted free agent in 1996. He was teammates with Tiki Barber with both Virginia and New York. Ellsworth attended Southampton High School in Courtland, Virginia, where he was a Super Prep All-American as a senior. He was the NFC Defensive Player of the Week for week 16 of the 1998 NFL season.

== NFL career statistics ==
Legend
**Bold**	Career high

Year	Team	Games		Tackles				Interceptions				Fumbles			
Year	Team	GP	GS	Comb	Solo	Ast	Sck	Int	Yds	TD	Lng	FF	FR	Yds	TD
1996	NYG	14	4	45	36	9	0.0	3	62	0	33	0	1	0	0
1997	NYG	16	1	27	20	7	0.0	4	40	0	25	0	**2**	**24**	0
1998	NYG	16	9	58	42	16	0.0	5	**92**	**2**	**43**	0	0	0	0
1999	NYG	14	14	**75**	55	**20**	0.0	**6**	80	0	26	0	1	15	0
2000	CLE	16	16	66	**56**	10	0.0	1	33	1	33	0	1	16	0
2001	CLE	11	9	47	39	8	**1.0**	1	19	0	19	0	0	0	0
		87	53	318	248	70	1.0	20	326	3	43	0	5	55	0

== See also ==
- History of the New York Giants (1994-present)
