= Larry Bowie =

Larry Bowie may refer to:

- Larry Bowie (guard) (1939–2012), American football guard
- Larry Bowie (running back) (born 1973), American football running back
