= Brad Maynard =

American football player (born 1974)

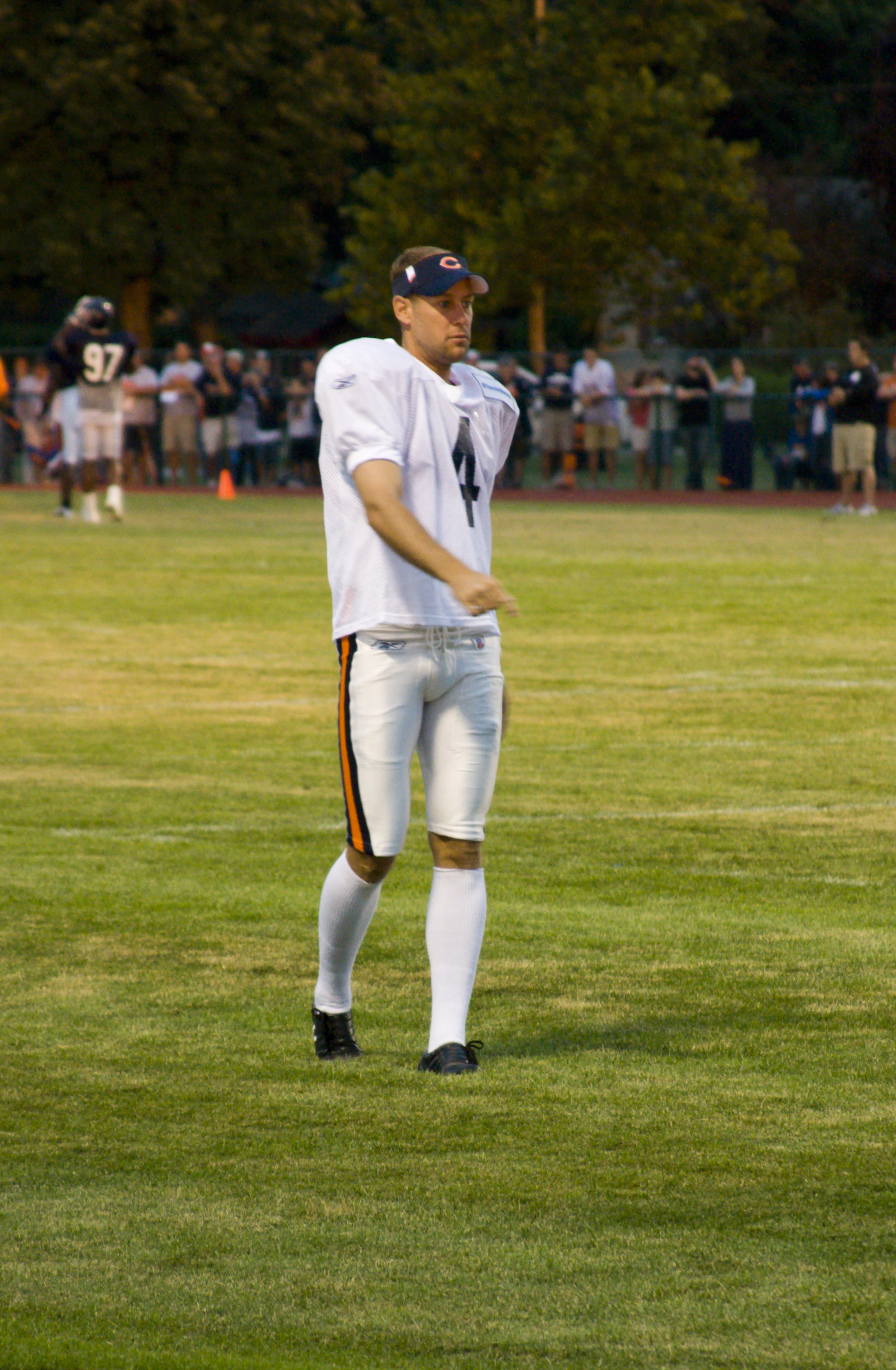
- Maynard with the Chicago Bears in 2009

No. 9, 4, 7
- Position: Punter

Personal information
- Born: February 9, 1974 (age 52); Tipton, Indiana, U.S.
- Listed height: 6 ft 1 in (1.85 m)
- Listed weight: 188 lb (85 kg)

Career information
- High school: Sheridan (Sheridan, Indiana)
- College: Ball State (1993–1996)
- NFL draft: 1997: 3rd round, 95th overall pick

Career history
- New York Giants (1997–2000); Chicago Bears (2001–2010); Houston Texans (2011)*; Cleveland Browns (2011)
- * Offseason or practice squad member only

Awards and highlights
- Second-team All-Pro (2004); 3× NFL punting yards leader (1997, 1998, 2004); 2× Consensus All-American (1995, 1996); Second-team All-American (1994); MAC Most Valuable Player (1996); MAC Defensive Player of the Year (1996); First-team All-MAC (1996); MAC Hall of Fame; Indiana Football Hall of Fame; NFL records: Most punts in a rookie season: 111 (1997); Most punting yards in a rookie season: 4,531 (1997); Most punts in a Super Bowl: 11 (XXXV)

Career NFL statistics
- Punts: 1,339
- Punting yards: 56,021
- Punting average: 41.8
- Longest punt: 75
- Inside 20: 439
- Stats at Pro Football Reference

Bradley Alan Maynard (born February 9, 1974) is an American former professional football player who was a punter in the National Football League (NFL). He played college football for the Ball State Cardinals, twice earning consensus All-American honors. Maynard was selected by the New York Giants in the third round of the 1997 NFL draft, and was also a member of the Chicago Bears, the Houston Texans and the Cleveland Browns.

== Early life ==
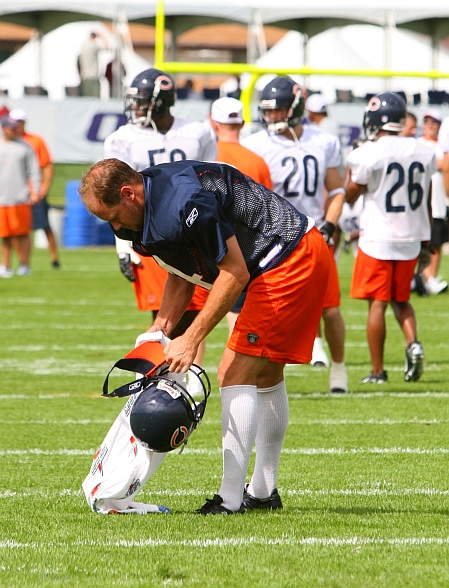
Maynard in 2007

Maynard was born in Tipton, Indiana. He attended Sheridan High School in Hamilton County, Indiana, where he played high school football for the Blackhawks.

== College career ==
Maynard attended Ball State University, where he played for the Cardinals. He averaged 44.2 yards per kick, ranking third in NCAA history. He amassed over 10,700 yards on 242 punts. Maynard was named onto the consensus All-American selection and All-Mid-American Conference first-team pick. He won MAC Defensive Player-of-the-Year and MVP following his senior campaign. He majored in business while playing for the Cardinals. He was described as quiet, humble, and hard working during his collegiate years.

Maynard was inducted into Ball State's Athletic Hall of Fame on February 8, 2008. On May 30, 2013, Maynard was inducted to the MAC Hall of Fame.

== Professional career ==
Pre-draft measurables
Height	Weight	Arm length	Hand span
6 ft 1 1/8 in (1.86 m)	184 lb (83 kg)	30 1/8 in (0.77 m)	9 in (0.23 m)
All values from NFL Combine

=== New York Giants ===
The New York Giants selected Maynard in the third round of the 1997 NFL draft, which made him one of the highest drafted punters in the modern era of football. He was a member of the 2000 New York Giants, who played the Baltimore Ravens in Super Bowl XXXV. Maynard set an NFL record for most punts in a single Super Bowl as the Giants lost 34–7.

=== Chicago Bears ===
After the 2000 season ended, Maynard became a free agent and signed with the Chicago Bears.

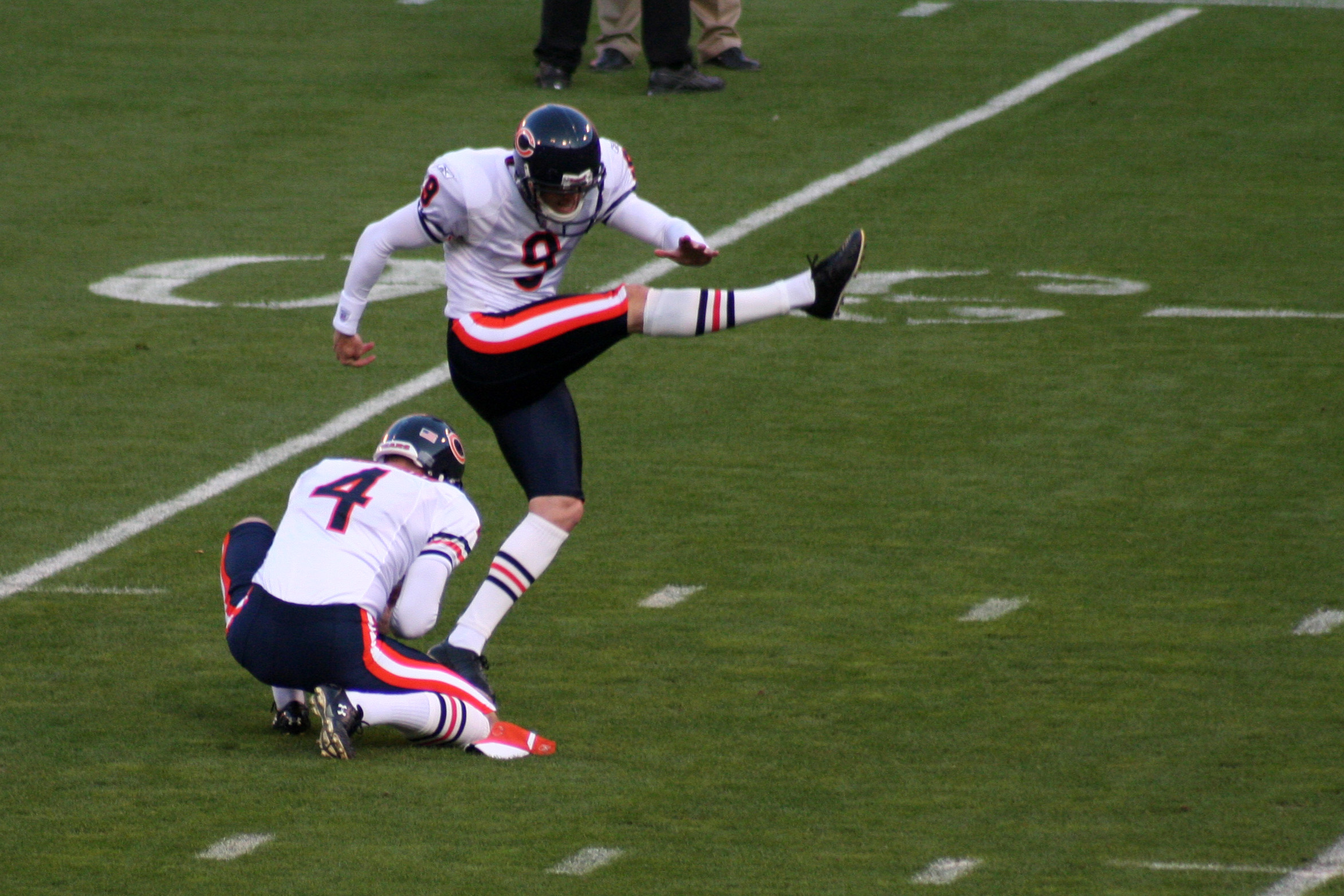
Maynard holds for Bears kicker Robbie Gould before a game in 2009 against the San Francisco 49ers

Maynard is known for his occasional trick plays. On rare occasions, he may pass in order to convert a first down. His most notable trick play came in 2001, when he threw a 27-yard touchdown pass to Brian Urlacher on a fake field goal en route to a 20–15 victory over the Washington Redskins, which secured the Bears the NFC's second playoff seed. He also threw passes on fake punts during two Bears' season finales in 2005 and 2006. His career passing stats are 4–7 with two touchdowns.

In January 2007, he was voted the sexiest member of the Chicago Bears. Along with Patrick Mannelly, kicker Robbie Gould claims Maynard to be one of the Bears' unsung heroes. On July 25, 2011, the Bears released Maynard. Maynard was replaced with former Jacksonville Jaguars punter Adam Podlesh.

=== Houston Texans ===
On August 2, 2011, the Houston Texans signed Maynard to a 1-year deal. He was released on September 3, and replaced by the rookie Brett Hartmann after originally keeping Maynard and cutting Hartmann.

=== Cleveland Browns ===
On September 13, 2011, the Cleveland Browns signed Maynard to a one-year contract to replace the injured Richmond McGee. Following the season, he was not re-signed.

== NFL career statistics ==
Legend
	Led the league
**Bold**	Career high

Year	Team	Punting									
Year	Team	GP	Punts	Yds	Net Yds	Lng	Avg	Net Avg	Blk	Ins20	TB
1997	NYG	16	**111**	4,531	3,873	57	40.8	34.6	1	33	**14**
1998	NYG	16	101	4,566	3,819	63	**45.2**	37.8	0	33	8
1999	NYG	16	89	3,651	3,126	63	41.0	35.1	0	31	6
2000	NYG	16	79	3,210	2,697	64	40.6	33.7	1	26	8
2001	CHI	16	87	3,709	3,222	60	42.6	37.0	0	36	8
2002	CHI	16	87	3,679	3,253	**75**	42.3	37.4	0	26	2
2003	CHI	16	79	3,258	2,801	53	41.2	34.6	**2**	23	9
2004	CHI	16	108	**4,638**	**4,175**	58	42.9	**38.7**	0	34	5
2005	CHI	16	96	3,937	3,424	63	41.0	35.3	1	24	11
2006	CHI	16	77	3,404	2,897	65	44.2	37.6	0	24	7
2007	CHI	15	88	3,682	3,288	56	41.8	37.4	0	27	9
2008	CHI	16	96	3,957	3,654	67	41.2	38.1	0	**40**	5
2009	CHI	16	77	3,191	2,879	66	41.4	37.4	0	26	2
2010	CHI	16	83	3,326	2,923	56	40.1	35.2	0	24	5
2011	CLE	15	81	3,282	2,974	63	40.5	36.7	0	32	1
Career		238	1,339	56,021	49,005	75	41.8	36.5	5	439	100

== Personal life ==
He and his wife, Karen, have two sons, Conner and Cole, and a daughter, Ava.

While on the Bears, every Monday during football season he was featured on "Maynard Monday" with Eric and Kathy on 101.9 the Mix in Chicago where he discusses the previous Bears game. His wife was also featured on the segment after a bye week.
