= Gary Brown (running back) =

American football player and coach (1969–2022)

No. 33
- Position: Running back

Personal information
- Born: July 1, 1969; Williamsport, Pennsylvania, U.S.
- Died: April 10, 2022 (aged 52); Williamsport, Pennsylvania, U.S.
- Listed height: 5 ft 11 in (1.80 m)
- Listed weight: 230 lb (104 kg)

Career information
- High school: Williamsport Area
- College: Penn State
- NFL draft: 1991: 8th round, 214th overall pick

Career history

Playing
- Houston Oilers (1991–1995); San Diego Chargers (1997); New York Giants (1998–1999)

Coaching
- Lycoming (2003–2005) Running backs coach; Susquehanna (2006–2007) Offensive coordinator; Rutgers (2008) Running backs coach; Cleveland Browns (2009–2012) Running backs coach; Dallas Cowboys (2013–2019) Running backs coach; Wisconsin (2021) Running backs coach

Career NFL statistics
- Rushing yards: 4,300
- Average: 4.2
- Touchdowns: 21
- Stats at Pro Football Reference

Gary Leroy Brown (July 1, 1969 – April 10, 2022) was an American professional football player who was a running back for eight seasons in the National Football League (NFL) for three teams from 1991 to 1999. Brown played college football at Penn State and was drafted by the Houston Oilers in the eighth round of the 1991 NFL draft. He was also the running backs coach at the University of Wisconsin.

== Playing career ==
Pre-draft measurables
Height	Weight	Arm length	Hand span	40-yard dash	10-yard split	20-yard split	20-yard shuttle	Vertical jump	Broad jump	Bench press
5 ft 10 1/8 in (1.78 m)	220 lb (100 kg)	30 in (0.76 m)	9 1/4 in (0.23 m)	4.75 s	1.70 s	2.81 s	4.65 s	29.0 in (0.74 m)	9 ft 3 in (2.82 m)	17 reps
All values from NFL Combine

Playing for Williamsport Area High School in the mid-1980s, Brown accumulated over 4,000 yards and 74 touchdowns in his high school career. While at Penn State, he rushed 260 times for 1,321 yards and 11 touchdowns. In his junior season, Brown was moved to defensive back after being in a deep running back room which included Blair Thomas. Brown played for three teams during his time in the NFL and rushed for over 1,000 yards twice in his career, first with the Houston Oilers during the 1993 season with 1,002 yards and then for the New York Giants during the 1998 season with 1,063 yards.

== Coaching career ==
After retiring from professional football following the 1999 season, Gary returned to Williamsport and was hired as an assistant coach at his alma mater, Williamsport High School, and at Lycoming College from 2003 to 2005. From 2006 to 2007, he served as offensive coordinator at Susquehanna University. In February 2008, he was named running backs coach at Rutgers University. Brown accepted a position with the Cleveland Browns in February 2009, as the running backs coach on Eric Mangini's staff. In February 2013, Brown was hired with the Dallas Cowboys as their running backs coach. In March 2021, Brown was hired as the running backs coach at the University of Wisconsin.

== Death ==
The 52-year-old coach and father of three had been in hospice care in his hometown of Williamsport, Pennsylvania, due to ongoing health concerns, which had led to him stepping down from coaching. Brown died April 10, 2022, from cancer.

== NFL career statistics ==
Year	Team	GP	Att	Yds	Avg	Lng	TD	Rec	Yds	Avg	Lng	TD
1991	HOU	11	8	85	10.6	39	1	2	1	0.5	4	0
1992	HOU	16	19	87	4.6	26	1	1	5	5.0	5	0
1993	HOU	16	195	1,002	5.1	26	6	21	240	11.4	38	2
1994	HOU	12	169	648	3.8	18	4	18	194	10.8	24	1
1995	HOU	10	86	293	3.4	21	0	6	16	2.7	7	0
1997	SD	15	253	945	3.7	32	4	21	137	6.5	27	0
1998	NYG	16	247	1,063	4.3	45	5	13	36	2.8	12	0
1999	NYG	3	55	177	3.2	28	0	2	2	1.0	1	0
Career		99	1,032	4,300	4.2	45	21	84	631	7.5	38	3
