= Andy Haase =

American football player (born 1974)

No. 89
- Position: Tight end

Personal information
- Born: July 10, 1974 (age 52); Odessa, Washington, U.S.
- Listed height: 6 ft 4 in (1.93 m)
- Listed weight: 260 lb (118 kg)

Career information
- High school: Colorado Springs (CO) Rampart
- College: Northern Colorado
- NFL draft: 1998: undrafted

Career history
- New York Giants (1998); Rhein Fire (1999)

Career NFL statistics
- Games played: 7
- Receptions: 2
- Receiving Yards: 33
- Stats at Pro Football Reference

Andrew Scott Haase (born July 10, 1974) is an American former professional football player who was a tight end for the New York Giants of the National Football League (NFL) in 1998. He played college football for the Northern Colorado Bears.
