= Conrad Hamilton =

American football player (born 1974)

No. 41, 24
- Position: Cornerback

Personal information
- Born: November 5, 1974 (age 52); Alamogordo, New Mexico, U.S.
- Listed height: 5 ft 10 in (1.78 m)
- Listed weight: 195 lb (88 kg)

Career information
- High school: Alamogordo
- College: Eastern New Mexico
- NFL draft: 1996: 7th round, 214th overall pick

Career history
- New York Giants (1996–1999); Atlanta Falcons (2001)

Career NFL statistics
- Games played: 54
- Games started: 18
- Sacks: 1
- Interceptions: 3
- Stats at Pro Football Reference

Conrad E. Hamilton (born November 5, 1974) is an American former professional football player who was a cornerback in the National Football League (NFL). He played six seasons for the New York Giants and Atlanta Falcons. He played college football for the Eastern New Mexico Greyhounds and was selected by the Giants in the seventh round of the 1996 NFL draft with the 214th overall pick. He is now the coach for the Desert Mountain Wolves in Scottsdale, Arizona.

During his career in the NFL, Hamilton played cornerback. He accumulated 3 interceptions, returned for 64 yards, and accumulated 144 solo tackles. He recorded one career sack. In 1998, Hamilton played in all 16 games for the Giants with 15 as a starter.

As a returner, he returned 19 kickoffs for 382 yards with a long of 29.
