= 1996 Arizona Cardinals season =

NFL team season

- Owner: Bill Bidwill
- Head coach: Vince Tobin
- Offensive coordinator: Jim Fassel
- Defensive coordinator: Dave McGinnis
- Home stadium: Sun Devil Stadium

Results
- Record: 7–9
- Division place: 4th NFC East
- Playoffs: Did not qualify
- All-Pros: FB Larry Centers (1st team); CB Aeneas Williams (2nd team)
- Pro Bowlers: FB Larry Centers; WR Rob Moore; CB Aeneas Williams

The 1996 Arizona Cardinals season was the franchise's 98th season, 77th in the National Football League and ninth in Arizona. The team improved upon their previous output of 4–12, winning seven games. Despite this improvement, the Cardinals failed to qualify for the playoffs for the fourteenth consecutive season.

The low point of the season was providing a notorious New York Jets team with its only win in front of fewer than thirty thousand people. This was the first time the Cardinals had opposed the Jets since 1978 (it was also the first time the Jets visited Arizona and the Cardinals' first home game in the series since 1971). The reason for this is that before the admission of the Texans in 2002, NFL scheduling formulas for games outside a team’s division were much more influenced by table position during the previous season; also, from 1977-93, teams which finished fifth in a five-team division would play only two interconference games the next season.

This was Boomer Esiason's only season with the Cardinals as he would re-sign with the Cincinnati Bengals after this season.

== Offseason ==
=== NFL draft ===
1996 Arizona Cardinals draft
Round	Pick	Player	Position	College	Notes
1	3	Simeon Rice *	Defensive end	Illinois	
2	32	Leeland McElroy	Running back	Texas A&M	
3	64	Johnny McWilliams	Tight end	USC	
4	112	Aaron Graham	Center	Nebraska	
5	137	James Dexter	Offensive tackle	South Carolina	
5	161	Harry Stamps	Offensive tackle	Oklahoma	
5	162	Dell McGee	Cornerback	Auburn	
6	169	Mike Foley	Defensive end	New Hampshire	
7	212	Jarius Hayes	Tight end	North Alabama	
Made roster * Made at least one Pro Bowl during career

=== Undrafted free agents ===
1996 undrafted free agents of note
Player	Position	College
Fred Brock	Wide receiver	Southern Miss
Mark Bultertield	Quarterback	Stanford
Art Celestine	Cornerback	New Mexico
Tom Claro	Offensive Lineman	Holy Cross
Kevin Jordan	Wide receiver	UCLA
Alle Larsen	Kicker	Virginia Tech
Ryan Leahy	Offensive Lineman	Notre Dame
Ronald McKinnon	Linebacker	North Alabama
Ervin Whitehead	Wide receiver	Westmar

== Personnel ==
1996 Arizona Cardinals staff
Front office: President – Bill Bidwill; Vice president – Larry Wilson; Assistant general manager – Joe Woolley; Assistant to the president – Bob Ferguson; Director of pro scouting – Keith Kidd; Director of college scouting – Bo Bolinger; Head coaches: Head coach – Vince Tobin; Offensive coaches: Offensive coordinator – Jim Fassel; Running backs – Jim Skipper; Wide receivers – Vic Rapp; Tight ends/quality control – Geep Chryst; Offensive line – Carl Mauck	Defensive coaches: Defensive coordinator – Dave McGinnis; Defensive line – Joe Greene; Linebackers – Glenn Pires; Defensive backs – Larry Marmie; Special teams coaches: Special teams – Al Everest; Strength and conditioning: Strength and conditioning – Bob Rogucki

== Roster ==
1996 Arizona Cardinals roster
Quarterbacks (QB): 15 Stoney Case; 7 Boomer Esiason; 11 Kent Graham; 5 Chad May; Running backs (RB): 37 Larry Centers FB; 36 Ryan Christopherson FB; 32 LeShon Johnson; 30 Leeland McElroy KR; 40 Derrick Moore; 45 Cedric Smith FB; Wide receivers (WR): 82 Stevie Anderson; 84 Marcus Dowdell PR; 83 Anthony Edwards; 85 Rob Moore; 81 Frank Sanders; Tight ends (TE): 80 Pat Carter; 89 Jarius Hayes; 87 Johnny McWilliams	Offensive linemen (OL): 75 Lomas Brown T; 62 Mike Devlin C/G; 64 James Dexter T; 54 Aaron Graham C; 66 Eric Jonassen T; 73 Matt Joyce T; 60 Anthony Redmon G; 78 Joe Staysniak G/T; 68 Joe Wolf T; Defensive linemen (DL): 63 Michael Bankston DE; 76 Jerry Drake DT; 92 Eric England DE; 96 Brad Ottis DE; 79 Simeon Rice DE; 98 Eric Swann DT; 94 Bernard Wilson DT	Linebackers (LB): 58 Eric Hill MLB; 56 Terry Irving OLB; 59 Seth Joyner OLB; 52 Wesley Leasy OLB; 55 Devon McDonald OLB; 57 Ronald McKinnon MLB; 95 Jamir Miller OLB; Defensive backs (DB): 46 Brent Alexander FS; 28 Tommy Bennett SS; 23 Ronnie Bradford CB; 43 Matt Darby SS; 44 D. J. Johnson CB; 42 Kwamie Lassiter FS; 47 JJ McCleskey CB; 27 Tito Paul CB; 35 Aeneas Williams CB; Special teams (ST): 3 Kevin Butler K; 10 Jeff Feagles P; 86 Trey Junkin LS	Practice squad: 16 Fred Brock WR; 61 Ryan Leahy G; 24 Dell McGee CB; 69 Leslie Ratliffe T; 17 Michael Watkins WR; Reserve: 90 Blaine Berger DT (IR); 65 Ernest Dye T (IR); 67 Duval Love G (IR); 70 Lance Scott C (IR); 74 Rob Selby G (IR); Rookies in italics 53 active, 5 reserve, 5 practice squad

== Regular season ==
=== Schedule ===
Week	Date	Opponent	Result	Record	Venue	Attendance
1	September 1	at Indianapolis Colts	**L** 13–20	0–1	RCA Dome	48,133
2	September 8	Miami Dolphins	**L** 10–38	0–2	Sun Devil Stadium	55,444
3	September 15	at New England Patriots	**L** 0–31	0–3	Foxboro Stadium	59,118
4	September 22	at New Orleans Saints	**W** 28–14	1–3	Louisiana Superdome	34,316
5	September 29	St. Louis Rams	**W** 31–28 (OT)	2–3	Sun Devil Stadium	33,116
6	Bye					
7	October 13	at **Dallas Cowboys**	**L** 3–17	2–4	Texas Stadium	64,096
8	October 20	Tampa Bay Buccaneers	**W** 13–9	3–4	Sun Devil Stadium	27,738
9	October 27	New York Jets	**L** 21–31	3–5	Sun Devil Stadium	28,088
10	November 3	at **New York Giants**	**L** 8–16	3–6	Giants Stadium	68,262
11	November 10	at **Washington Redskins**	**W** 37–34 (OT)	4–6	RFK Stadium	51,929
12	November 17	**New York Giants**	**W** 31–23	5–6	Sun Devil Stadium	34,924
13	November 24	**Philadelphia Eagles**	**W** 36–30	6–6	Sun Devil Stadium	36,175
14	December 1	at Minnesota Vikings	**L** 17–41	6–7	Hubert H. Humphrey Metrodome	45,767
15	December 8	**Dallas Cowboys**	**L** 6–10	6–8	Sun Devil Stadium	70,763
16	December 15	**Washington Redskins**	**W** 27–26	7–8	Sun Devil Stadium	34,260
17	December 22	at **Philadelphia Eagles**	**L** 19–29	7–9	Veterans Stadium	63,658
Note: Intra-division opponents are in **bold** text.

== Game summaries ==
=== Week 1: at Indianapolis Colts ===
Week 1: Arizona Cardinals at Indianapolis Colts – Game summary

Quarter	1	2	3	4	Total
Cardinals	3	3	0	7	13
Colts	0	10	0	10	20

at RCA Dome, Indianapolis, Indiana

- Date: September 1
- Game time: 1:00 p.m. EST/11:00 a.m. MST
- Game weather: None (Indoor stadium)
- Game attendance: 48,133
- TV announcers (Fox): Kenny Albert, Tim Green
- Box Score

Game information

First quarter

- ARI – Greg Davis 24-yard field goal. Cardinals 3–0.

Second quarter

- ARI – Greg Davis 29-yard field goal. Cardinals 6–0.
- IND – Zack Crockett 2-yard pass from Jim Harbaugh (Cary Blanchard kick). Colts 7–6.
- IND – Cary Blanchard 23-yard field goal. Colts 10–6.'

Third quarter

- No scoring plays

Fourth quarter

- IND – Cary Blanchard 40-yard field goal. Colts 13–6.
- IND – Marvin Harrison 35-yard pass from Jim Harbaugh (Cary Blanchard kick). Colts 20–6.
- ARI – Boomer Esiason 2-yard run (Greg Davis kick). Colts 20–13.

Top passers

- ARI – Boomer Esiason – 25/38, 237 yards
- IND – Jim Harbaugh – 16/25, 196 yards, 2 TD, INT

Top rushers

- ARI – Leeland McElroy – 17 rushes, 63 yards
- IND – Marshall Faulk – 12 rushes, 46 yards

Top receivers

- ARI – Larry Centers – 11 receptions, 108 yards
- IND – Marvin Harrison – 6 receptions, 85 yards, TD

=== Week 2: vs. Miami Dolphins ===
Week 2: Miami Dolphins at Arizona Cardinals – Game summary

Quarter	1	2	3	4	Total
Dolphins	7	17	7	7	38
Cardinals	0	0	10	0	10

at Sun Devil Stadium, Tempe, Arizona

- Date: September 8
- Game time: 6:00 p.m. MST
- Game weather: 90 °F (32 °C)
- Game attendance: 55,444
- Referee: Howard Roe
- TV announcers (TNT): Verne Lundquist, Pat Haden, Ernie Johnson
- Box Score

Game information

First quarter

- MIA – Karim Abdul-Jabbar 3-yard run (Joe Nedney kick). Dolphins 7–0.

Second quarter

- MIA – Karim Abdul-Jabbar 3-yard run (Joe Nedney kick). Dolphins 14–0.
- MIA – Lamar Thomas 20-yard pass from Dan Marino (Joe Nedney kick). Dolphins 21–0.
- MIA – Joe Nedney 36-yard field goal. Dolphins 24–0.

Third quarter

- ARI – Cedric Smith 1-yard pass from Kent Graham (Greg Davis kick). Dolphins 24–7.
- ARI – Greg Davis 26-yard field goal. Dolphins 24–10.
- MIA – Irving Spikes 1-yard run (Joe Nedney kick). Dolphins 31–10.

Fourth quarter

- MIA – O.J. McDuffie 5-yard pass from Dan Marino (Joe Nedney kick). Dolphins 38–10.

Top passers

- MIA – Dan Marino – 14/23, 178 yards, 2 TD
- ARI – Kent Graham – 13/19, 133 yards, TD, 2 INT

Top rushers

- MIA – Irving Spikes – 11 rushes, 79 yards, TD
- ARI – Larry Centers – 6 rushes, 23 yards

Top receivers

- MIA – Charles Jordan – 2 receptions, 51 yards
- ARI – Frank Sanders – 8 receptions, 81 yards

=== Week 3: at New England Patriots ===
Week 3: Arizona Cardinals at New England Patriots – Game summary

Quarter	1	2	3	4	Total
Cardinals	0	0	0	0	0
Patriots	7	13	8	3	31

at Foxboro Stadium, Foxborough, Massachusetts

- Date: September 15
- Game time: 1:00 p.m. EST/11:00 a.m. MST
- Game weather: 64 °F (18 °C)
- Game attendance: 59,118
- TV announcers (Fox): Kevin Harlan, Jerry Glanville
- Box Score

Game information

First quarter

- NE – Curtis Martin 13-yard pass from Drew Bledsoe (Adam Vinatieri kick). Patriots 7–0.

Second quarter

- NE – Curtis Martin 1-yard run (Adam Vinatieri kick). Patriots 14–0.
- NE – Ben Coates 2-yard pass from Drew Bledsoe (kick failed). Patriots 20–0.

Third quarter

- NE – Curtis Martin 7-yard pass from Drew Bledsoe (Drew Bledsoe–Curtis Martin pass). Patriots 28–0.

Fourth quarter

- NE – Adam Vinatieri 31-yard field goal. Patriots 31–0.

Top passers

- ARI – Kent Graham – 9/19, 111 yards, INT
- NE – Drew Bledsoe – 21/35, 221 yards, 3 TD

Top rushers

- ARI – Larry Centers – 6 rushes, 31 yards
- NE – Curtis Martin – 27 rushes, 91 yards, TD

Top receivers

- ARI – Larry Centers – 5 receptions, 56 yards
- NE – Terry Glenn – 5 receptions, 66 yards

=== Week 4: at New Orleans Saints ===
Week 4: Arizona Cardinals at New Orleans Saints – Game summary

Quarter	1	2	3	4	Total
Cardinals	3	3	8	14	28
Saints	0	7	0	7	14

at Louisiana Superdome, New Orleans, Louisiana

- Date: September 22
- Game time: 1:00 p.m. CST/12:00 p.m. MST
- Game weather: None (Indoor stadium)
- Game attendance: 34,316
- Referee: Jerry Markbreit
- TV announcers (Fox): Eric Clemons, Jim Burt
- Box Score

Game information

First quarter

- ARI – Greg Davis 25-yard field goal. Cardinals 3–0.

Second quarter

- ARI – Greg Davis 25-yard field goal. Cardinals 6–0.
- NO – Brian Jones 11-yard blocked punt return (Doug Brien kick). Saints 7–6.'

Third quarter

- ARI – Rob Moore 20-yard pass from Kent Graham (Kent Graham–Rob Moore). Cardinals 14–7.

Fourth quarter

- ARI – LeShon Johnson 56-yard run (Greg Davis kick). Cardinals 21–7.'
- ARI – LeShon Johnson 70-yard run (Greg Davis kick). Cardinals 28–7.'
- NO – Haywood Jeffires 23-yard pass from Jim Everett (Doug Brien kick). Cardinals 28–14.

Top passers

- ARI – Kent Graham – 11/25, 165 yards, TD
- NO – Jim Everett – 18/33, 164 yards, TD, INT

Top rushers

- ARI – LeShon Johnson – 21 rushes, 214 yards, 2 TD
- NO – Ray Zellars – 12 rushes, 57 yards

Top receivers

- ARI – Rob Moore – 4 receptions, 91 yards, TD
- NO – Haywood Jeffires – 2 receptions, 31 yards, TD

=== Week 5: vs. St. Louis Rams ===
Week 5: St. Louis Rams at Arizona Cardinals – Game summary

Quarter	1	2	3	4	OT	Total
Rams	7	14	7	0	0	28
Cardinals	0	14	0	14	3	31

at Sun Devil Stadium, Tempe, Arizona

- Date: September 29
- Game time: 2:00 p.m. MST
- Game weather: 83 °F (28 °C)
- Game attendance: 33,116
- TV announcers (Fox): Eric Clemons, Jim Burt
- Box Score

Game information

First quarter

- STL – Eddie Kennison 66-yard punt return (Chip Lohmiller kick). Rams 7–0.

Second quarter

- STL – Isaac Bruce 46-yard pass from Tony Banks (Chip Lohmiller kick). Rams 14–0.
- ARI – Rob Moore 24-yard pass from Kent Graham (Greg Davis kick). Rams 14–7.
- STL – Eddie Kennison 34-yard pass from Tony Banks (Chip Lohmiller kick). Rams 21–7.
- ARI – LeShon Johnson 2-yard pass from Kent Graham (Greg Davis kick). Rams 21–14.

Third quarter

- STL – Isaac Bruce 49-yard pass from Tony Banks (Chip Lohmiller kick). Rams 28–14.

Fourth quarter

- ARI – Larry Centers 5-yard pass from Kent Graham (Greg Davis kick). Rams 28–21.
- ARI – Frank Sanders 5-yard pass from Kent Graham (Greg Davis kick). Tied 28–28.

Overtime

- ARI – Greg Davis 24-yard field goal. Cardinals 31–28.

Top passers

- STL – Tony Banks – 10/17, 186 yards, 3 TD, INT
- ARI – Kent Graham – 37/58, 366 yards, 4 TD

Top rushers

- STL – Harold Green – 10 rushes, 39 yards
- ARI – LeShon Johnson – 12 rushes, 97 yards

Top receivers

- STL – Isaac Bruce – 4 receptions, 117 yards, 2 TD
- ARI – Rob Moore – 9 receptions, 143 yards, TD

=== Week 7: at Dallas Cowboys ===
Week 7: Arizona Cardinals at Dallas Cowboys – Game summary

Quarter	1	2	3	4	Total
Cardinals	0	0	0	3	3
Cowboys	0	3	7	7	17

at Texas Stadium, Irving, Texas

- Date: October 13
- Game time: 12:00 p.m. CST/11:00 a.m. MST
- Game weather: 71 °F (22 °C)
- Game attendance: 64,096
- TV announcers (Fox): Pat Summerall, John Madden
- Box Score

Game information

First quarter

- No scoring plays

Second quarter

- DAL – Chris Boniol 23-yard field goal. Cowboys 3–0.'

Third quarter

- DAL – Emmitt Smith 3-yard run (Chris Boniol kick). Cowboys 10–0.

Fourth quarter

- ARI – Greg Davis 49-yard field goal. Cowboys 10–3.'
- DAL – Emmitt Smith 13-yard run (Chris Boniol kick). Cowboys 17–3.

Top passers

- ARI – Kent Graham – 16/31, 141 yards, INT
- DAL – Troy Aikman – 23/37, 199 yards, INT

Top rushers

- ARI – Larry Centers – 5 rushes, 24 yards
- DAL – Emmitt Smith – 21 rushes, 112 yards, 2 TD

Top receivers

- ARI – Rob Moore – 3 receptions, 45 yards
- DAL – Michael Irvin – 5 receptions, 51 yards

=== Week 8: vs. Tampa Bay Buccaneers ===
Week 8: Tampa Bay Buccaneers at Arizona Cardinals – Game summary

Quarter	1	2	3	4	Total
Buccaneers	0	0	3	6	9
Cardinals	3	7	3	0	13

at Sun Devil Stadium, Tempe, Arizona

- Date: October 20
- Game time: 2:00 p.m. MST
- Game weather: 73 °F (23 °C)
- Game attendance: 27,738
- TV announcers (Fox): Mike Breen, Bill Maas
- Box Score

Game information

First quarter

- ARI – Greg Davis 22-yard field goal. Cardinals 3–0.

Second quarter

- ARI – Larry Centers 5-yard pass from Kent Graham (Greg Davis kick). Cardinals 10–0.

Third quarter

- TB – Michael Husted 41-yard field goal. Cardinals 10–3.
- ARI – Greg Davis 37-yard field goal. Cardinals 13–3.

Fourth quarter

- TB – Mike Alstott 1-yard run (kick failed). Cardinals 13–9.

Top passers

- TB – Trent Dilfer – 22/35, 229 yards
- ARI – Kent Graham – 17/26, 146 yards, TD

Top rushers

- TB – Reggie Brooks – 14 rushes, 43 yards
- ARI – Kent Graham – 5 rushes, 40 yards

Top receivers

- TB – Courtney Hawkins – 6 receptions, 74 yards
- ARI – Frank Sanders – 4 receptions, 40 yards

=== Week 9: vs. New York Jets ===
Week 9: New York Jets at Arizona Cardinals – Game summary

Quarter	1	2	3	4	Total
Jets	3	14	0	14	31
Cardinals	0	0	14	7	21

at Sun Devil Stadium, Tempe, Arizona

- Date: October 27
- Game time: 2:00 p.m. MST
- Game weather: 53 °F (12 °C)
- Game attendance: 28,088
- TV announcers (NBC): Charlie Jones, Randy Cross
- Box Score

Game information

First quarter

- NYJ – Nick Lowery 37-yard field goal. Jets 3–0.

Second quarter

- NYJ – Keyshawn Johnson 34-yard pass from Frank Reich (Nick Lowery kick). Jets 10–0.
- NYJ – Richie Anderson 1-yard run (Nick Lowery kick). Jets 17–0.

Third quarter

- ARI – Larry Centers 1-yard pass from Kent Graham (Greg Davis kick). Jets 17–7.
- ARI – Larry Centers 2-yard pass from Kent Graham (Greg Davis kick). Jets 17–14.

Fourth quarter

- NYJ – Adrian Murrell 1-yard run (Nick Lowery kick). Jets 24–14.
- ARI – Rob Moore 6-yard pass from Kent Graham (Greg Davis kick). Jets 24–21.
- NYJ – Reggie Cobb 2-yard run (Nick Lowery kick). Jets 31–21.

Top passers

- NYJ – Frank Reich – 22/31, 254 yards, TD, 2 INT
- ARI – Kent Graham – 17/32, 255 yards, 3 TD, INT

Top rushers

- NYJ – Adrian Murrell – 31 rushes, 199 yards, TD
- ARI – LeShon Johnson – 12 rushes, 85 yards

Top receivers

- NYJ – Keyshawn Johnson – 7 receptions, 94 yards, TD
- ARI – Rob Moore – 7 receptions, 143 yards, TD

=== Week 10: at New York Giants ===
Week 10: Arizona Cardinals at New York Giants – Game summary

Quarter	1	2	3	4	Total
Cardinals	0	0	0	8	8
Giants	3	0	3	10	16

at Giants Stadium, East Rutherford, New Jersey

- Date: November 3
- Game time: 1:00 p.m. EST/11:00 a.m. MST
- Game weather: 42 °F (6 °C)
- Game attendance: 64,096
- TV announcers (Fox): Kevin Harlan, Jerry Glanville
- Box Score

Game information

First quarter

- NYG – Brad Daluiso 31-yard field goal. Giants 3–0.'

Second quarter

- No scoring plays

Third quarter

- NYG – Brad Daluiso 32-yard field goal. Giants 6–0.'

Fourth quarter

- NYG – Thomas Lewis 24-yard pass from Danny Kanell (Brad Daluiso kick). Giants 13–0.
- NYG – Brad Daluiso 45-yard field goal. Giants 16–0.'
- ARI – Frank Sanders 7-yard pass from Boomer Esiason (Boomer Esiason run). Giants 16–8.

Top passers

- ARI – Boomer Esiason – 20/40, 196 yards, TD, 2 INT
- NYG – Danny Kanell – 14/27, 128 yards, TD

Top rushers

- ARI – LeShon Johnson – 10 rushes, 29 yards
- NYG – Rodney Hampton – 24 rushes, 94 yards

Top receivers

- ARI – Frank Sanders – 5 receptions, 61 yards, TD
- NYG – Thomas Lewis – 7 receptions, 77 yards, TD

=== Week 11: at Washington Redskins ===
Week 11: Arizona Cardinals at Washington Redskins – Game summary

Quarter	1	2	3	4	OT	Total
Cardinals	3	10	0	21	3	37
Redskins	3	10	14	7	0	34

at Robert F. Kennedy Memorial Stadium, Washington, District of Columbia

- Date: November 10
- Game time: 1:00 p.m. EST/11:00 a.m. MST
- Game weather: 42 °F (6 °C)
- Game attendance: 51,929
- TV announcers (Fox): Thom Brennaman, Ron Pitts
- Box Score

Game information

First quarter

- ARI – Kevin Butler 26-yard field goal. Cardinals 3–0.'
- WAS – Scott Blanton 53-yard field goal. Tied 3–3.'

Second quarter

- WAS – Marc Logan 36-yard run (Scott Blanton kick). Redskins 10–3.'
- ARI – Kevin Butler 39-yard field goal. Redskins 10–6.'
- ARI – Marcus Dowdell 64-yard pass from Boomer Esiason (Kevin Butler kick). Cardinals 13–10.
- WAS – Scott Blanton 24-yard field goal. Tied 13–13.'

Third quarter

- WAS – Michael Westbrook 17-yard pass from Gus Frerotte (Scott Blanton kick). Redskins 20–13.
- WAS – Terry Allen 1-yard run (Scott Blanton kick). Redskins 27–13.'

Fourth quarter

- ARI – Larry Centers 1-yard run (Kevin Butler kick). Redskins 27–20.'
- WAS – Terry Allen 1-yard run (Scott Blanton kick). Redskins 34–20.'
- ARI – Johnny McWilliams 13-yard pass from Boomer Esiason (Kevin Butler kick). Redskins 34–27.
- ARI – Anthony Edwards 12-yard pass from Boomer Esiason (Kevin Butler kick). Tied 34–34.

Overtime

- ARI – Kevin Butler 32-yard field goal. Cardinals 37–34.'

Top passers

- ARI – Boomer Esiason – 35/59, 522 yards, 3 TD, 4 INT
- WAS – Gus Frerotte – 18/36, 212 yards, TD, INT

Top rushers

- ARI – LeShon Johnson – 20 rushes, 65 yards
- WAS – Terry Allen – 31 rushes, 124 yards, 2 TD

Top receivers

- ARI – Marcus Dowdle – 3 receptions, 92 yards, TD
- WAS – Michael Westbrook – 6 receptions, 91 yards, TD

=== Week 12: vs. New York Giants ===
Week 12: New York Giants at Arizona Cardinals – Game summary

Quarter	1	2	3	4	Total
Giants	0	6	7	10	23
Cardinals	14	7	7	3	31

at Sun Devil Stadium, Tempe, Arizona

- Date: November 17
- Game time: 2:00 p.m. MST
- Game weather: 57 °F (14 °C)
- Game attendance: 34,924
- TV announcers (Fox): Kevin Harlan, Jerry Glanville
- Box Score

Game information

First quarter

- ARI – Rob Moore 6-yard pass from Boomer Esiason (Kevin Butler kick). Cardinals 7–0.
- ARI – Cedric Smith 1-yard run (Kevin Butler kick). Cardinals 14–0.

Second quarter

- NYG – Brad Daluiso 25-yard field goal. Cardinals 14–3.
- ARI – Frank Sanders 2-yard pass from Boomer Esiason (Kevin Butler kick). Cardinals 21–3.
- NYG – Brad Daluiso 22-yard field goal. Cardinals 21–6.

Third quarter

- NYG – Tyrone Wheatley 4-yard pass from Dave Brown (Brad Daluiso kick). Cardinals 21–13.
- ARI – LeShon Johnson 1-yard run (Kevin Butler kick). Cardinals 28–13.

Fourth quarter

- NYG – Tyrone Wheatley 9-yard pass from Dave Brown (Brad Daluiso kick). Cardinals 28–20.
- ARI – Kevin Butler 18-yard field goal. Cardinals 31–20.
- NYG – Brad Daluiso 27-yard field goal. Cardinals 31–23.

Top passers

- NYG – Dave Brown – 22/41, 262 yards, 2 TD, 2 INT
- ARI – Boomer Esiason – 18/27, 260 yards, 2 TD, INT

Top rushers

- NYG – Tyrone Wheatley – 13 rushes, 50 yards
- ARI – LeShon Johnson – 17 rushes, 48 yards, TD

Top receivers

- NYG – Chris Calloway – 6 receptions, 95 yards
- ARI – LeShon Johnson – 2 receptions, 50 yards

=== Week 13: vs. Philadelphia Eagles ===
Week 13: Philadelphia Eagles at Arizona Cardinals – Game summary

Quarter	1	2	3	4	Total
Eagles	7	3	3	17	30
Cardinals	3	10	3	20	36

at Sun Devil Stadium, Tempe, Arizona

- Date: November 24
- Game time: 2:00 p.m. MST
- Game weather: 61 °F (16 °C)
- Game attendance: 36,175
- Referee: Ron Blum
- TV announcers (Fox): Joe Buck, Bill Maas
- Box Score

Game information

First quarter

- PHI – Ricky Watters 1-yard run (Gary Anderson kick). Eagles 7–0.
- ARI – Kevin Butler 21-yard field goal. Eagles 7–3.

Second quarter

- PHI – Gary Anderson 44-yard field goal. Eagles 10–3.
- ARI – Leeland McElroy 4-yard run (Kevin Butler kick). Tied 10–10.
- ARI – Kevin Butler 36-yard field goal. Cardinals 13–10.

Third quarter

- PHI – Gary Anderson 25-yard field goal. Tied 13–13.
- ARI – Kevin Butler 27-yard field goal. Cardinals 16–13.

Fourth quarter

- ARI – Pat Carter 6-yard pass from Boomer Esiason (pass failed). Cardinals 22–13.
- PHI – Ricky Watters 4-yard run (Gary Anderson kick). Cardinals 22–20.
- ARI – Larry Centers 2-yard pass from Boomer Esiason (Kevin Butler kick). Cardinals 29–20.
- PHI – Derrick Witherspoon 95-yard kickoff return (Gary Anderson kick). Cardinals 29–27.
- PHI – Gary Anderson 32-yard field goal. Eagles 30–29.
- ARI – Marcus Dowdell 24-yard pass from Boomer Esiason (Kevin Butler kick). Cardinals 36–30.

Top passers

- PHI – Ty Detmer – 21/38, 322 yards, INT
- ARI – Boomer Esiason – 24/43, 367 yards, 3 TD

Top rushers

- PHI – Ricky Watters – 25 rushes, 64 yards, 2 TD
- ARI – Larry Centers – 13 rushes, 45 yards

Top receivers

- PHI – Irving Fryar – 7 receptions, 131 yards
- ARI – Rob Moore – 9 receptions, 156 yards

=== Week 14: at Minnesota Vikings ===
Week 14: Arizona Cardinals at Minnesota Vikings – Game summary

Quarter	1	2	3	4	Total
Cardinals	0	3	0	14	17
Vikings	3	10	14	14	41

at Hubert H. Humphrey Metrodome, Minneapolis, Minnesota

- Date: December 1
- Game time: 12:00 p.m. CST/11:00 a.m. MST
- Game weather: None (Indoor stadium)
- Game attendance: 45,767
- TV announcers (Fox): Kenny Albert, Tim Green
- Box Score

Game information

First quarter

- MIN – Scott Sisson 38-yard field goal. Vikings 3–0.'

Second quarter

- MIN – Scott Sisson 26-yard field goal. Vikings 6–0.'
- MIN – Amp Lee 19-yard pass from Brad Johnson (Scott Sisson kick). Vikings 13–0.
- ARI – Kevin Butler 38-yard field goal. Vikings 13–3.'

Third quarter

- MIN – Jake Reed 40-yard pass from Brad Johnson (Scott Sisson kick). Vikings 20–3.
- MIN – Qadry Ismail 13-yard pass from Brad Johnson (Scott Sisson kick). Vikings 27–3.

Fourth quarter

- MIN – Cris Carter 4-yard pass from Brad Johnson (Scott Sisson kick). Vikings 34–3.
- ARI – Larry Centers 9-yard pass from Boomer Esiason (Kevin Butler kick). Vikings 34–10.
- MIN – Leroy Hoard 1-yard run (Scott Sisson kick). Vikings 41–10.'
- ARI – Larry Centers 1-yard run (Kevin Butler kick). Vikings 41–17.'

Top passers

- ARI – Boomer Esiason – 26/40, 270 yards, TD, 2 INT
- MIN – Brad Johnson – 19/26, 238 yards, 4 TD

Top rushers

- ARI – Larry Centers – 4 rushes, 21 yards, TD
- MIN – Leroy Hoard – 22 rushes, 94 yards, TD

Top receivers

- ARI – Larry Centers – 10 receptions, 85 yards, TD
- MIN – Jake Reed – 4 receptions, 79 yards, TD

=== Week 15: vs. Dallas Cowboys ===
Week 15: Dallas Cowboys at Arizona Cardinals – Game summary

Quarter	1	2	3	4	Total
Cowboys	0	0	7	3	10
Cardinals	3	3	0	0	6

at Sun Devil Stadium, Tempe, Arizona

- Date: December 8
- Game time: 2:00 p.m. MST
- Game weather: 63 °F (17 °C)
- Game attendance: 70,763
- Referee: Walt Coleman
- TV announcers (Fox): Pat Summerall, John Madden
- Box Score

Game information

First quarter

- ARI – Kevin Butler 33-yard field goal. Cardinals 3–0.

Second quarter

- ARI – Kevin Butler 28-yard field goal. Cardinals 6–0.

Third quarter

- DAL – Michael Irvin 50-yard pass from Troy Aikman (Chris Boniol kick). Cowboys 7–6.

Fourth quarter

- DAL – Chris Boniol 31-yard field goal. Cowboys 10–6.

Top passers

- DAL – Troy Aikman – 15/24, 255 yards, TD
- ARI – Boomer Esiason – 18/36, 224 yards, 2 INT

Top rushers

- DAL – Emmitt Smith – 27 rushes, 70 yards
- ARI – Leeland McElroy – 14 rushes, 90 yards

Top receivers

- DAL – Michael Irving – 8 receptions, 198 yards, TD
- ARI – Rob Moore – 4 receptions, 94 yards

=== Week 16: vs. Washington Redskins ===
Week 16: Washington Redskins at Arizona Cardinals – Game summary

Quarter	1	2	3	4	Total
Redskins	3	13	7	3	26
Cardinals	7	7	3	10	27

at Sun Devil Stadium, Tempe, Arizona

- Date: December 15
- Game time: 2:00 p.m. MST
- Game weather: 61 °F (16 °C)
- Game attendance: 34,260
- Referee: Dale Hamer
- TV announcers (Fox): Kenny Albert, Tim Green
- Box Score

Game information

First quarter

- ARI – Larry Centers 6-yard pass from Kent Graham (Kevin Butler kick). Cardinals 7–0.
- WAS – Scott Blanton 20-yard field goal. Cardinals 7–3.

Second quarter

- ARI – Jamir Miller 26-yard fumble return (Kevin Butler kick). Cardinals 14–3.
- WAS – Scott Turner 0-yard fumble return (Scott Blanton kick). Cardinals 14–10.
- WAS – Scott Blanton 22-yard field goal. Cardinals 14–13.
- WAS – Scott Blanton 23-yard field goal. Redskins 16–14.

Third quarter

- WAS – Terry Allen 14-yard run (Scott Blanton kick). Redskins 23–14.'
- ARI – Kevin Butler 22-yard field goal. Redskins 23–17.

Fourth quarter

- ARI – Frank Sanders 21-yard pass from Kent Graham (Kevin Butler kick). Cardinals 24–23.
- WAS – Scott Blanton 35-yard field goal. Redskins 26–24.
- ARI – Kevin Butler 28-yard field goal. Cardinals 27–26.

Top passers

- WAS – Gus Frerotte – 22/40, 258 yards
- ARI – Kent Graham – 20/46, 232 yards, 2 TD, INT

Top rushers

- WAS – Terry Allen – 17 rushes, 69 yards, TD
- ARI – Leeland McElroy – 18 rushes, 59 yards

Top receivers

- WAS – Michael Westbrook – 4 receptions, 59 yards
- ARI – Frank Sanders – 6 receptions, 82 yards, TD

=== Week 17: at Philadelphia Eagles ===
Week 17: Arizona Cardinals at Philadelphia Eagles – Game summary

Quarter	1	2	3	4	Total
Cardinals	0	3	3	13	19
Eagles	13	10	3	3	29

at Veterans Stadium, Philadelphia, Pennsylvania

- Date: December 22
- Game time: 1:00 p.m. EST/11:00 a.m. MST
- Game weather: 30 °F (−1 °C)
- Game attendance: 63,658
- TV announcers (Fox): Kenny Albert, Tim Green
- Box Score

Game information

First quarter

- PHI – Mike Mamula 4-yard fumble return (Gary Anderson kick). Eagles 7–0.'
- PHI – Gary Anderson 23-yard field goal. Eagles 10–0.'
- PHI – Gary Anderson 22-yard field goal. Eagles 13–0.'

Second quarter

- PHI – Gary Anderson 43-yard field goal. Eagles 16–0.'
- ARI – Kevin Butler 41-yard field goal. Eagles 16–3.'
- PHI – Ricky Watters 1-yard run (Gary Anderson kick). Eagles 23–3.'

Third quarter

- ARI – Kevin Butler 41-yard field goal. Eagles 23–6.'
- PHI – Gary Anderson 26-yard field goal. Eagles 26–6.'

Fourth quarter

- PHI – Gary Anderson 39-yard field goal. Eagles 29–6.'
- ARI – Leeland McElroy 22-yard pass from Boomer Esiason (kick failed). Eagles 29–12.
- ARI – Aeneas Williams 65-yard interception return (Kevin Butler kick). Eagles 29–19.

Top passers

- ARI – Boomer Esiason – 12/26, 138 yards, TD
- PHI – Ty Detmer – 20/32, 216 yards, INT

Top rushers

- ARI – Leeland McElroy – 9 rushes, 45 yards
- PHI – Ricky Watters – 31 rushes, 99 yards, TD

Top receivers

- ARI – Larry Centers – 6 receptions, 43 yards
- PHI – Chris Jones – 5 receptions, 65 yards

=== Standings ===
NFC East
	W	L	T	PCT	PF	PA	STK
^{(3)} Dallas Cowboys	10	6	0	.625	286	250	L1
^{(5)} Philadelphia Eagles	10	6	0	.625	363	341	W2
Washington Redskins	9	7	0	.563	364	312	W1
Arizona Cardinals	7	9	0	.438	300	397	L1
New York Giants	6	10	0	.375	242	297	L2
