= 1998 Arizona Cardinals season =

NFL team season

- Owner: Bill Bidwill
- Head coach: Vince Tobin
- Home stadium: Sun Devil Stadium

Results
- Record: 9–7
- Division place: 2nd NFC East
- Playoffs: Won Wild Card Playoffs (at Cowboys) 20–7; Lost Divisional Playoffs (at Vikings) 21–41
- Pro Bowlers: DB Aeneas Williams

The 1998 Arizona Cardinals season was the franchise's 100th season, 79th season in the National Football League (NFL) and the 11th in Arizona. The club posted its first winning record since 1984, appeared in the postseason for the first time since 1982, its first postseason appearance in a non-strike season since 1975, and won its first postseason game since 1947 (it was also their first ever playoff win on the road). It was the Cardinals' first playoff appearance in the franchise's tenure in Arizona. After shocking the 10–6 Dallas Cowboys in the opening round in which the Cardinals won 20–7, Arizona ended up losing to the 15–1 Minnesota Vikings, 41–21 in the Divisional round. Over the next ten seasons, the Cardinals fell out of contention. They returned to the playoffs following the 2008 season, including a Super Bowl appearance despite a similarly mediocre 9–7 record. As such, this was the only playoff appearance for the Cardinals during their stay in Tempe. By 2008, they had moved west to Glendale.

Statistics site Football Outsiders states that the 1998 Arizona Cardinals are the third-worst team behind the 2004 Rams and 2010 Seahawks to qualify for the NFL playoffs since they began calculating ratings. Ironically, all three of those teams won their first playoff games before falling in the divisional round.

The Cardinals benefited from a weak schedule which allowed them to avoid the eventual two-time Super Bowl champion Denver Broncos from the AFC West. The other four teams in the division failed to post a winning record. Arizona also faced four of the NFC worst team's from the Central (Bears, Lions) and West (Rams, Saints) divisions.

The season also marked the Cardinals' first game in St. Louis since re-locating to Arizona after the 1987 season. The Cardinals defeated the St. Louis Rams 20–17. Prior to the 2002 season, the Cardinals would be realigned to the NFC West, thus becoming divisional rivals to the Rams, and from then would play a regular season game in their former city every year until the Rams' return to the Los Angeles metropolitan area after the 2015 season.

== Offseason ==
=== NFL draft ===
1998 Arizona Cardinals draft
Round	Pick	Player	Position	College	Notes
1	3	Andre Wadsworth	Defensive end	Florida State	
2	33	Corey Chavous *	Defensive back	Vanderbilt	
2	36	Anthony Clement	Offensive tackle	Louisiana–Lafayette	
4	95	Michael Pittman	Running back	Fresno State	
5	125	Terry Hardy	Tight end	Southern Miss	
6	158	Zack Walz	Linebacker	Dartmouth	
7	193	Phil Savoy	Wide receiver	Colorado	
7	209	Jomo Cousins	Defensive end	Florida A&M	
7	226	Pat Tillman	Defensive back	Arizona State	
7	233	Ron Janes	Running back	Missouri	
Made roster * Made at least one Pro Bowl during career

=== Undrafted free agents ===
1998 undrafted free agents of note
Player	Position	College
Cory Sauter	Quarterback	Minnesota
Cory Wedel	Kicker	Wyoming

== Personnel ==
1998 Arizona Cardinals staff
Front office: President – Bill Bidwill; Vice president – Larry Wilson; Vice president and general counsel – Michael Bidwill; Vice president of player personnel – Bob Ferguson; Assistant to the president – Rod Graves; Head coaches: Head coach – Vince Tobin; Offensive coaches: Offensive coordinator – Marc Trestman; Quarterbacks – Geep Chryst; Running backs – Johnny Roland; Wide receivers – Vic Rapp; Tight ends – Hank Kuhlmann; Offensive line – George Warhop	Defensive coaches: Defensive coordinator – Dave McGinnis; Defensive line – Joe Greene; Linebackers – Glenn Pires; Defensive backs – Larry Marmie; Special teams coaches: Special teams – Al Everest; Strength and conditioning: Strength and conditioning – Bob Rogucki

== Roster ==
1998 Arizona Cardinals roster
Quarterbacks (QB): 17 Dave Brown; 15 Stoney Case; 16 Jake Plummer; Running backs (RB): 24 Mario Bates; 37 Larry Centers; 21 Eric Metcalf; 29 Adrian Murrell; 32 Michael Pittman; Wide receivers (WR): 82 Ronnie Anderson; 89 Fred Brock; 48 Jarius Hayes; 85 Rob Moore; 81 Frank Sanders; Tight ends (TE): 84 Chris Gedney; 80 Terry Hardy; 48 Jarius Hayes; 87 Johnny McWilliams	Offensive linemen (OL): 75 Lomas Brown T; 79 Jon Clark T; 72 Jerome Daniels G; 69 Allen DeGraffenreid; 62 Mike Devlin C; 64 James Dexter T; 67 Chris Dishman G; 54 Aaron Graham C; 71 Lester Holmes G; 73 Matt Joyce G/T; Defensive linemen (DL): 92 Jomo Cousins DE; 74 Mike Moten DE; 97 Simeon Rice DE; 78 Carl Simpson DT; 93 Mark Smith DT; 91 Rashod Swinger DT; 90 Andre Wadsworth DE; 94 Bernard Wilson DT	Linebackers (LB): 56 Terry Irving OLB; 53 Mark Maddox MLB; 50 Tony McCombs OLB; 57 Ronald McKinnon MLB; 95 Jamir Miller OLB; 55 Patrick Sapp OLB; 52 Zack Walz OLB; Defensive backs (DB): 28 Tommy Bennett SS; 26 J. B. Brown CB; 25 Corey Chavous CB; 27 Ty Howard CB; 22 Tom Knight; 42 Kwamie Lassiter FS; 44 J. J. McCleskey CB/S; 40 Pat Tillman FS; 35 Aeneas Williams CB; Special teams (ST): 13 Chris Jacke K; 86 Trey Junkin LS; 10 Scott Player P	Practice squad: 31 Rod Brown FB; 14 Kevin Drake WR; 63 Antonio Fleming G; 18 Andy McCullough WR; Reserve: 12 Chad Carpenter WR (IR); 65 Anthony Clement T (IR); 76 Jerry Drake DT (IR); 83 Anthony Edwards WR (IR); 70 Thomas Guynes G/T (IR); 6 Joe Nedney K (IR); 96 Brad Ottis DE (IR); 45 Cedric Smith FB (IR); 98 Eric Swann DT (IR); Rookies in italics 53 active, 9 reserve, 4 practice squad

== Regular season ==
=== Schedule ===
Week	Date	Opponent	Result	Record	Venue	Attendance
1	September 6	at **Dallas Cowboys**	**L** 10–38	0–1	Texas Stadium	63,602
2	September 13	at Seattle Seahawks	**L** 14–33	0–2	Kingdome	57,678
3	September 20	**Philadelphia Eagles**	**W** 17–3	1–2	Sun Devil Stadium	39,782
4	September 27	at St. Louis Rams	**W** 20–17	2–2	Trans World Dome	55,832
5	October 4	Oakland Raiders	**L** 20–23	2–3	Sun Devil Stadium	53,240
6	October 11	Chicago Bears	**W** 20–7	3–3	Sun Devil Stadium	50,495
7	October 18	at **New York Giants**	**L** 7–34	3–4	Giants Stadium	70,456
8	Bye					
9	November 1	at Detroit Lions	**W** 17–15	4–4	Pontiac Silverdome	66,087
10	November 8	**Washington Redskins**	**W** 29–27	5–4	Sun Devil Stadium	45,950
11	November 15	**Dallas Cowboys**	**L** 28–35	5–5	Sun Devil Stadium	71,670
12	November 22	at **Washington Redskins**	**W** 45–42	6–5	Jack Kent Cooke Stadium	63,435
13	November 29	at Kansas City Chiefs	**L** 24–34	6–6	Arrowhead Stadium	69,613
14	December 6	**New York Giants**	**L** 19–23	6–7	Sun Devil Stadium	46,128
15	December 13	at **Philadelphia Eagles**	**W** 20–17 (OT)	7–7	Veterans Stadium	62,176
16	December 20	New Orleans Saints	**W** 19–17	8–7	Sun Devil Stadium	51,617
17	December 27	San Diego Chargers	**W** 16–13	9–7	Sun Devil Stadium	71,670
Note: Intra-division opponents are in **bold** text.

=== Game summaries ===
==== Week 1: at Dallas Cowboys ====
Week 1: Arizona Cardinals at Dallas Cowboys – Game summary

Quarter	1	2	3	4	Total
Cardinals	0	0	10	0	**10**
**Cowboys**	0	14	7	17	**38**

at Texas Stadium, Irving, Texas

- Date: September 6
- Game time: 3:05 p.m. CST/2:05 p.m. MST
- Game weather: 88 °F (31 °C)
- Game attendance: 63,602
- TV announcers (Fox): Tim Ryan, Bill Maas, Ronnie Lott, & Mike Doocy
- Box Score

Game information

**First quarter**

- No scoring plays

**Second quarter**

- DAL – Troy Aikman 1-yard run (Richie Cunningham kick). Cowboys 7–0.
- DAL – Ernie Mills 30-yard pass from Troy Aikman (Richie Cunningham kick). Cowboys 14–0.

**Third quarter**

- ARI – Joe Nedney 22-yard field goal. Cowboys 14–3.
- DAL – Troy Aikman 2-yard run (Richie Cunningham kick). Cowboys 21–3.
- ARI – Jake Plummer 1-yard run (Joe Nedney kick). Cowboys 21–10.

**Fourth quarter**

- DAL – Billy Davis 7-yard pass from Troy Aikman (Richie Cunningham kick). Cowboys 28–10.
- DAL – Richie Cunningham 25-yard field goal. Cowboys 31–10.
- DAL – Kenny Wheaton 15-yard fumble return (Richie Cunningham kick). Cowboys 38–10.

**Top passers**

- ARI – Jake Plummer – 14/33, 166 yards
- DAL – Troy Aikman – 22/32, 256 yards, 2 TD, 2 INT

**Top rushers**

- ARI – Adrian Murrell – 13 rushes, 35 yards
- DAL – Emmitt Smith – 29 rushes, 124 yards

**Top receivers**

- ARI – Rob Moore – 4 receptions, 84 yards
- DAL – Michael Irvin – 9 receptions, 119 yards

==== Week 2: at Seattle Seahawks ====
Week 2: Arizona Cardinals at Seattle Seahawks – Game summary

Quarter	1	2	3	4	Total
Cardinals	0	0	7	7	**14**
**Seahawks**	10	10	0	13	**33**

at Kingdome, Seattle, Washington

- Date: September 13
- Game time: 1:15 p.m. PST/2:15 p.m. MST
- Game weather: None (Indoor stadium)
- Game attendance: 57,678
- Referee: Jerry Markbreit
- TV announcers (Fox): Steve Buckhantz & Trevor Matich
- Box Score

Game information

**First quarter**

- SEA – Todd Peterson 51-yard field goal. Seahawks 3–0.
- SEA – Willie Williams 28-yard interception return (Todd Peterson kick). Seahawks 10–0.

**Second quarter**

- SEA – Mack Strong 4-yard pass from Warren Moon (Todd Peterson kick). Seahawks 17–0.
- SEA – Todd Peterson 22-yard field goal. Seahawks 20–0.

**Third quarter**

- ARI – Adrian Murrell 4-yard run (Joe Nedney kick). Seahawks 20–7.

**Fourth quarter**

- SEA – Joey Galloway 9-yard pass from Warren Moon (run failed). Seahawks 26–7.
- SEA – Shawn Springs 56-yard interception return (Todd Peterson kick). Seahawks 33–7.
- ARI – Chris Gedney 23-yard pass from Jake Plummer (Joe Nedney kick). Seahawks 33–14.

**Top passers**

- ARI – Jake Plummer – 22/36, 204 yards, TD, 3 INT
- SEA – Warren Moon – 22/32, 146 yards, 2 TD

**Top rushers**

- ARI – Adrian Murrell – 20 rushes, 79 yards, TD
- SEA – Ricky Watters – 22 rushes, 105 yards

**Top receivers**

- ARI – Larry Centers – 7 receptions, 54 yards
- SEA – Mike Pritchard – 3 receptions, 54 yards

==== Week 3: vs. Philadelphia Eagles ====
Week 3: Philadelphia Eagles at Arizona Cardinals – Game summary

Quarter	1	2	3	4	Total
Eagles	0	0	0	3	**3**
**Cardinals**	0	0	0	17	**17**

at Sun Devil Stadium, Tempe, Arizona

- Date: September 20
- Game time: 6:20 p.m. MST
- Game weather: 90 °F (32 °C)
- Game attendance: 36,717
- TV announcers (ESPN): Mike Patrick, Joe Thiesmann, Paul Maguire, & Solomon Wilcots
- Box Score

Game information

**First quarter**

- No scoring plays

**Second quarter**

- No scoring plays

**Third quarter**

- No scoring plays

**Fourth quarter**

- PHI – Chris Boniol 29-yard field goal. Eagles 3–0.
- ARI – Joe Nedney 47-yard field goal. Tied 3–3.
- ARI – Johnny McWilliams 7-yard pass from Jake Plummer (Joe Nedney kick). Cardinals 10–3.
- ARI – Adrian Murrell 25-yard run (Joe Nedney kick). Cardinals 17–3.

**Top passers**

- PHI – Rodney Peete – 13/23, 145 yards
- ARI – Jake Plummer – 21/35, 137 yards, TD

**Top rushers**

- PHI – Duce Staley – 17 rushes, 67 yards
- ARI – Adrian Murrell – 22 rushes, 145 yards, TD

**Top receivers**

- PHI – Russell Copeland – 6 receptions, 76 yards
- ARI – Johnny McWilliams – 3 receptions, 36 yards, TD

==== Week 4: at St. Louis Rams ====
Week 4: Arizona Cardinals at St. Louis Rams – Game summary

Quarter	1	2	3	4	Total
**Cardinals**	0	17	0	3	**20**
Rams	7	3	0	7	**17**

at Trans World Dome, St. Louis, Missouri

- Date: September 27
- Game time: 1:00 p.m. CST/12:00 p.m. MST
- Game weather: None (Indoor stadium)
- Game attendance: 55,832
- TV announcers (Fox): Kenny Albert & Tim Green
- Box Score

Game information

**First quarter**

- STL – Robert Holcombe 5-yard run (Jeff Wilkins kick). Rams 7–0.

**Second quarter**

- ARI – Joe Nedney 22-yard field goal. Rams 7–3.
- ARI – Frank Sanders 13-yard pass from Jake Plummer (Joe Nedney kick). Cardinals 10–7.
- ARI – Adrian Murrell 4-yard run (Joe Nedney kick). Cardinals 17–7.
- STL – Jeff Wilkins 57-yard field goal. Cardinals 17–10.

**Third quarter**

- No scoring plays

**Fourth quarter**

- STL – Robert Holcombe 4-yard run (Jeff Wilkins kick). Tied 17–17.
- ARI – Joe Nedney 29-yard field goal. Cardinals 20–17.

**Top passers**

- ARI – Jake Plummer – 21/31, 211 yards, TD, INT
- STL – Tony Banks – 15/26, 171 yards

**Top rushers**

- ARI – Adrian Murrell – 29 rushes, 68 yards, TD
- STL – Robert Holcombe – 21 rushes, 84 yards, 2 TD

**Top receivers**

- ARI – Frank Sanders – 9 receptions, 86 yards, TD
- STL – Amp Lee – 5 receptions, 53 yards

==== Week 5: vs. Oakland Raiders ====
Week 5: Oakland Raiders at Arizona Cardinals – Game summary

Quarter	1	2	3	4	Total
**Raiders**	6	17	0	0	**23**
Cardinals	7	7	0	6	**20**

at Sun Devil Stadium, Tempe, Arizona

- Date: October 4
- Game time: 2:05 p.m. MST
- Game weather: 80 °F (27 °C)
- Game attendance: 52,178
- TV announcers (CBS): Verne Lundquist, Randy Cross, & Michele Tafoya
- Box Score

Game information

**First quarter**

- ARI – Johnny McWilliams 2-yard pass from Jake Plummer (Joe Nedney kick). Cardinals 7–0.
- OAK – Greg Davis 51-yard field goal. Cardinals 7–3.
- OAK – Greg Davis 40-yard field goal. Cardinals 7–6.

**Second quarter**

- ARI – Rob Moore 13-yard pass from Jake Plummer (Joe Nedney kick). Cardinals 14–6.
- OAK – Greg Davis 34-yard field goal. Cardinals 14–9.
- OAK – Charles Woodson 46-yard interception return (Greg Davis kick). Raiders 16–14.
- OAK – Donald Hollas 1-yard run (Greg Davis kick). Raiders 23–14.

**Third quarter**

- No scoring plays

**Fourth quarter**

- ARI – Joe Nedney 41-yard field goal. Raiders 23–17.
- ARI – Joe Nedney 29-yard field goal. Raiders 23–20.

**Top passers**

- OAK – Donald Hollas – 12/22, 104 yards
- ARI – Jake Plummer – 23/39, 208 yards, 2 TD, 3 INT

**Top rushers**

- OAK – Napoleon Kaufman – 16 rushes, 58 yards
- ARI – Adrian Murrell – 13 rushes, 28 yards

**Top receivers**

- OAK – Rickey Dudley – 3 receptions, 35 yards
- ARI – Frank Sanders – 10 receptions, 118 yards

==== Week 6: vs. Chicago Bears ====
Week 6: Chicago Bears at Arizona Cardinals – Game summary

Quarter	1	2	3	4	Total
Bears	0	0	0	7	**7**
**Cardinals**	3	14	0	3	**20**

at Sun Devil Stadium, Tempe, Arizona

- Date: October 11
- Game time: 2:05 p.m. MST
- Game weather: 77 °F (25 °C)
- Game attendance: 47,860
- TV announcers (Fox): Ray Bentley & Ron Pitts
- Box Score

Game information

**First quarter**

- ARI – Joe Nedney 49-yard field goal. Cardinals 3–0.

**Second quarter**

- ARI – Mario Bates 2-yard run (Joe Nedney kick). Cardinals 10–0.
- ARI – Mario Bates 2-yard run (Joe Nedney kick). Cardinals 17–0.

**Third quarter**

- No scoring plays

**Fourth quarter**

- ARI – Joe Nedney 40-yard field goal. Cardinals 20–0.
- CHI – Bobby Engram 79-yard pass from Erik Kramer (Jeff Jaeger kick). Cardinals 20–7.

**Top passers**

- CHI – Erik Kramer – 16/28, 247 yards, TD, 4 INT
- ARI – Jake Plummer – 18/25, 157 yards, 2 INT

**Top rushers**

- CHI – Edgar Bennett – 9 rushes, 29 yards
- ARI – Adrian Murrell – 21 rushes, 60 yards

**Top receivers**

- CHI – Bobby Engram – 5 receptions, 142 yards, TD
- ARI – Larry Centers – 7 receptions, 52 yards

==== Week 7: at New York Giants ====
Week 7: Arizona Cardinals at New York Giants – Game summary

Quarter	1	2	3	4	Total
Cardinals	0	7	0	0	**7**
**Giants**	7	10	10	7	**34**

at Giants Stadium, East Rutherford, New Jersey

- Date: October 18
- Game time: 3:05 p.m. CST/2:05 p.m. MST
- Game weather: 64 °F (18 °C)
- Game attendance: 70,456
- TV announcers (Fox): Ray Bentley & Ron Pitts
- Box Score

Game information
- NYG – Charles Way 1-yard pass from Danny Kanell (Brad Daluiso kick). Giants 7–0.

**Second quarter**

- NYG – Gary Brown 1-yard run (Brad Daluiso kick). Giants 14–0.
- ARI – Johnny McWilliams 14-yard pass from Jake Plummer (Joe Nedney kick). Giants 14–7.
- NYG – Brad Daluiso 26-yard field goal. Giants 17–7.

**Third quarter**

- NYG – Brad Daluiso 34-yard field goal. Giants 20–7.
- NYG – Chris Calloway 19-yard pass from Danny Kanell (Brad Daluiso kick). Giants 27–7.

**Fourth quarter**

- NYG – Amani Toomer 18-yard pass from Danny Kanell (Brad Daluiso kick). Giants 34–7.

**Top passers**

- ARI – Jake Plummer – 12/21, 139 yards, TD, 2 INT
- NYG – Danny Kanell – 22/36, 259 yards, 3 TD

**Top rushers**

- ARI – Mario Bates – 13 rushes, 45 yards
- NYG – Gary Brown – 24 rushes, 108 yards, TD

**Top receivers**

- ARI – Rob Moore – 4 receptions, 52 yards
- NYG – Chris Calloway – 6 receptions, 97 yards, TD

==== Week 9: at Detroit Lions ====
Week 9: Arizona Cardinals at Detroit Lions – Game summary

Quarter	1	2	3	4	Total
**Cardinals**	0	7	7	3	**17**
Lions	0	6	3	6	**15**

at Pontiac Silverdome, Pontiac, Michigan

- Date: November 1
- Game time: 1:00 p.m. EST/11:00 a.m. MST
- Game weather: None (Indoor stadium)
- Game attendance: 66,087
- TV announcers (Fox): Ray Bentley & Ron Pitts
- Box Score

Game information

**First quarter**

- No scoring plays

**Second quarter**

- DET – Jason Hanson 28-yard field goal. Lions 3–0.
- ARI – Frank Sanders 16-yard pass from Jake Plummer (Joe Nedney kick). Cardinals 7–3.
- DET – Jason Hanson 47-yard field goal. Cardinals 7–6.

**Third quarter**

- DET – Jason Hanson 44-yard field goal. Lions 9–7.
- ARI – Rob Moore 36-yard pass from Jake Plummer (Joe Nedney kick). Cardinals 14–9.

**Fourth quarter**

- DET – Tommy Vardell 1-yard run (kick failed). Lions 15–14.
- ARI – Joe Nedney 53-yard field goal. Cardinals 17–15.

**Top passers**

- ARI – Jake Plummer – 15/25, 198 yards, 2 TD, INT
- DET – Frank Reich – 10/15, 119 yards

**Top rushers**

- ARI – Mario Bates – 14 rushes, 32 yards
- DET – Barry Sanders – 27 rushes, 107 yards

**Top receivers**

- ARI – Rob Moore – 5 receptions, 107 yards TD
- DET – Johnnie Morton – 7 receptions, 115 yards

==== Week 10: vs. Washington Redskins ====
Week 10: Washington Redskins at Arizona Cardinals – Game summary

Quarter	1	2	3	4	Total
Redskins	3	14	0	10	**27**
**Cardinals**	0	7	7	15	**29**

at Sun Devil Stadium, Tempe, Arizona

- Date: November 8
- Game time: 2:05 p.m. MST
- Game weather: 65 °F (18 °C)
- Game attendance: 43,159
- Referee: Jerry Markbreit
- TV announcers (Fox): Tim Ryan, Bill Maas, & Ronnie Lott
- Box Score

Game information

**First quarter**

- WAS – Cary Blanchard 34-yard field goal. Redskins 3–0.

**Second quarter**

- WAS – Skip Hicks 2-yard run (Cary Blanchard kick). Redskins 10–0.
- ARI – Mario Bates 1-yard run (Joe Nedney kick). Redskins 10–7.
- WAS – Brian Mitchell 6-yard run (Cary Blanchard kick). Redskins 17–7.

**Third quarter**

- ARI – Larry Centers 4-yard pass from Jake Plummer (Joe Nedney kick). Redskins 17–14.

**Fourth quarter**

- ARI – Mario Bates 1-yard run (Joe Nedney kick). Cardinals 21–17.
- ARI – Team safety. Cardinals 23–17.
- ARI – Joe Nedney 26-yard field goal. Cardinals 26–17.
- WAS – Leslie Shepherd 35-yard pass from Trent Green (Cary Blanchard kick). Cardinals 26–24.
- WAS – Cary Blanchard 54-yard field goal. Cardinals 27–26.
- ARI – Joe Nedney 47-yard field goal. Cardinals 29–27.

**Top passers**

- WAS – Trent Green – 17/33, 183 yards, TD
- ARI – Jake Plummer – 22/30, 186 yards, TD

**Top rushers**

- WAS – Skip Hicks – 15 rushes, 64 yards, TD
- ARI – Adrian Murrell – 23 rushes, 107 yards

**Top receivers**

- WAS – Brian Mitchell – 7 receptions, 58 yards
- ARI – Frank Sanders – 5 receptions, 50 yards

==== Week 11: vs. Dallas Cowboys ====
Week 11: Dallas Cowboys at Arizona Cardinals – Game summary

Quarter	1	2	3	4	Total
**Cowboys**	14	14	7	0	**35**
Cardinals	0	7	14	7	**28**

at Sun Devil Stadium, Tempe, Arizona

- Date: November 15
- Game time: 2:15 p.m. MST
- Game weather: 64 °F (18 °C)
- Game attendance: 69,923
- Referee: Ron Blum
- TV announcers (Fox): Pat Summerall, John Madden, & Kevin McCabe
- Box Score

Game information

**First quarter**

- DAL – Chris Warren 3-yard run (Richie Cunningham kick). Cowboys 7–0.
- DAL – Daryl Johnston 1-yard pass from Troy Aikman (Richie Cunningham kick). Cowboys 14–0.

**Second quarter**

- DAL – Emmitt Smith 1-yard run (Richie Cunningham kick). Cowboys 21–0.
- DAL – Emmitt Smith 1-yard run (Richie Cunningham kick). Cowboys 28–0.
- ARI – Frank Sanders 2-yard pass from Jake Plummer (Joe Nedney kick). Cowboys 28–7.

**Third quarter**

- ARI – Mario Bates 2-yard run (Joe Nedney kick). Cowboys 28–14.
- DAL – Emmitt Smith 3-yard run (Richie Cunningham kick). Cowboys 35–14.
- ARI – Rob Moore 3-yard pass from Jake Plummer (Joe Nedney kick). Cowboys 35–21.

**Fourth quarter**

- ARI – Adrian Murrell 7-yard pass from Jake Plummer (Joe Nedney kick). Cowboys 35–28.

**Top passers**

- DAL – Troy Aikman – 14/18, 208 yards, TD
- ARI – Jake Plummer – 31/56, 465 yards, 3 TD, INT

**Top rushers**

- DAL – Emmitt Smith – 26 rushes, 118 yards, 3 TD
- ARI – Adrian Murrell – 14 rushes, 34 yards

**Top receivers**

- DAL – Billy Davis – 3 receptions, 70 yards
- ARI – Frank Sanders – 11 receptions, 190 yards

==== Week 12: at Washington Redskins ====
Week 12: Arizona Cardinals at Washington Redskins – Game summary

Quarter	1	2	3	4	Total
**Cardinals**	17	14	7	7	**45**
Redskins	0	6	21	15	**42**

at Jack Kent Cooke Stadium, Landover, Maryland

- Date: November 22
- Game time: 1:00 p.m. EST/11:00 a.m. MST
- Game weather: 48 °F (9 °C)
- Game attendance: 63,435
- TV announcers (Fox): Tim Ryan, Bill Maas, & Ronnie Lott
- Box Score

Game information
- ARI – Joe Nedney 26-yard field goal. Cardinals 3–0.
- ARI – Johnny McWilliams 6-yard pass from Jake Plummer (Joe Nedney kick). Cardinals 10–0.
- ARI – Jake Plummer 1-yard run (Joe Nedney kick). Cardinals 17–0.

**Second quarter**

- ARI – Adrian Murrell 13-yard run (Joe Nedney kick). Cardinals 24–0.
- ARI – Jake Plummer 10-yard run (Joe Nedney kick). Cardinals 31–0.
- WAS – Michael Westbrook 15-yard pass from Trent Green (kick failed). Cardinals 31–6.

**Third quarter**

- WAS – Michael Westbrook 12-yard pass from Trent Green (Cary Blanchard kick). Cardinals 31–13.
- ARI – Larry Centers 9-yard pass from Jake Plummer (Joe Nedney kick). Cardinals 38–13.
- WAS – Michael Westbrook 11-yard pass from Trent Green (Cary Blanchard kick). Cardinals 38–20.
- WAS – Leslie Shepherd 16-yard pass from Trent Green (Cary Blanchard kick). Cardinals 38–27.

**Fourth quarter**

- WAS – Skip Hicks 5-yard run (Trent Green–Leslie Shepherd pass). Cardinals 38–35.
- ARI – Jake Plummer 1-yard run (Joe Nedney kick). Cardinals 45–35.
- WAS – Trent Green 2-yard run (Cary Blanchard kick). Cardinals 45–42.

**Top passers**

- ARI – Jake Plummer – 17/28, 251 yards, 2 TD, INT
- WAS – Trent Green – 22/36, 382 yards, 4 TD, INT

**Top rushers**

- ARI – Adrian Murrell – 20 rushes, 92 yards, TD
- WAS – Trent Green – 5 rushes, 26 yards, TD

**Top receivers**

- ARI – Frank Sanders – 3 receptions, 83 yards
- WAS – Michael Westbrook – 10 receptions, 135 yards, 3 TD

==== Week 13: at Kansas City Chiefs ====
Week 13: Arizona Cardinals at Kansas City Chiefs – Game summary

Quarter	1	2	3	4	Total
Cardinals	0	10	7	7	**24**
**Chiefs**	7	7	10	10	**34**

at Arrowhead Stadium, Kansas City, Missouri

- Date: November 29
- Game time: 12:00 p.m. CST/11:00 a.m. MST
- Game weather: 66 °F (19 °C)
- Game attendance: 69,613
- TV announcers (Fox): Tim Ryan, Bill Maas, Ronnie Lott, & Kevin McCabe
- Box Score

Game information
- KC – Bam Morris 2-yard run (Pete Stoyanovich kick). Chiefs 7–0.

**Second quarter**

- ARI – Joe Nedney 37-yard field goal. Chiefs 7–3.
- KC – Donnell Bennett 2-yard pass from Rich Gannon (Pete Stoyanovich kick). Chiefs 14–3.
- ARI – Rob Moore 10-yard pass from Jake Plummer (Joe Nedney kick). Chiefs 14–10.

**Third quarter**

- KC – Derrick Alexander 30-yard pass from Rich Gannon (Pete Stoyanovich kick). Chiefs 21–10.
- KC – Pete Stoyanovich 37-yard field goal. Chiefs 24–10.
- ARI – Adrian Murrell 4-yard run (Joe Nedney kick). Chiefs 24–17.

**Fourth quarter**

- KC – Derrick Alexander 15-yard pass from Rich Gannon (Pete Stoyanovich kick). Chiefs 31–17.
- ARI – Mario Bates 1-yard run (Joe Nedney kick). Chiefs 31–24.
- KC – Pete Stoyanovich 18-yard field goal. Chiefs 34–24.

**Top passers**

- ARI – Jake Plummer – 20/37, 250 yards, TD, 2 INT
- KC – Rich Gannon – 21/28, 231 yards, 3 TD, INT

**Top rushers**

- ARI – Adrian Murrell – 13 rushes, 77 yards, TD
- KC – Bam Morris – 15 rushes, 76 yards, TD

**Top receivers**

- ARI – Frank Sanders – 6 receptions, 100 yards
- KC – Derrick Alexander – 6 receptions, 116 yards, 2 TD

==== Week 14: vs. New York Giants ====
Week 14: New York Giants at Arizona Cardinals – Game summary

Quarter	1	2	3	4	Total
**Giants**	7	3	10	3	**23**
Cardinals	14	3	0	2	**19**

at Sun Devil Stadium, Tempe, Arizona

- Date: December 6
- Game time: 2:05 p.m. MST
- Game weather: overcast 45 °F (7 °C)
- Game attendance: 46,128
- TV announcers (Fox): Sam Rosen & Jerry Glanville
- Box Score

Game information

**First quarter**

- ARI – Adrian Murrell 20-yard pass from Jake Plummer (Chris Jacke kick). Cardinals 7–0.
- NYG – Tiki Barber 87-yard pass from Kent Graham (Brad Daluiso kick). Tied 7–7.
- ARI – Adrian Murrell 8-yard run (Chris Jacke kick). Cardinals 14–7.

**Second quarter**

- ARI – Chris Jacke 21-yard field goal. Cardinals 17–7.
- NYG – Brad Daluiso 51-yard field goal. Cardinals 17–10.

**Third quarter**

- NYG – Brad Daluiso 28-yard field goal. Cardinals 17–13.
- NYG – Charles Way 8-yard run (Brad Daluiso kick). Giants 20–17.

**Fourth quarter**

- NYG – Brad Daluiso 45-yard field goal. Giants 23–17.
- ARI – Team safety. Giants 23–19.

**Top passers**

- NYG – Kent Graham – 8/23, 144 yards, TD, 2 INT
- ARI – Jake Plummer – 18/40, 263 yards, TD, 2 INT

**Top rushers**

- NYG – Gary Brown – 25 rushes, 124 yards
- ARI – Adrian Murrell – 16 rushes, 53 yards, TD

**Top receivers**

- NYG – Tiki Barber – 2 receptions, 91 yards, TD
- ARI – Larry Centers – 5 receptions, 68 yards

==== Week 15: at Philadelphia Eagles ====
Week 15: Arizona Cardinals at Philadelphia Eagles – Game summary

Quarter	1	2	3	4	OT	Total
**Cardinals**	10	0	0	7	3	**20**
Eagles	0	10	0	7	0	**17**

at Veterans Stadium, Philadelphia, Pennsylvania

- Date: December 13
- Game time: 1:00 p.m. EST/11:00 a.m. MST
- Game weather: 43 °F (6 °C)
- Game attendance: 62,176
- TV announcers (Fox): Tim Ryan, Bill Maas, & Ronnie Lott
- Box Score

Game information
- ARI – Chris Jacke 28-yard field goal. Cardinals 3–0.
- ARI – Tommy Bennett 70-yard interception return (Chris Jacke kick). Cardinals 10–0.

**Second quarter**

- PHI – Duce Staley 30-yard run (Chris Boniol kick). Cardinals 10–7.
- PHI – Chris Boniol 19-yard field goal. Tied 10–10.

**Third quarter**

- No scoring plays

**Fourth quarter**

- PHI – Irving Fryar 26-yard pass from Koy Detmer (Chris Boniol kick). Eagles 17–10.
- ARI – Rob Moore 9-yard pass from Jake Plummer (Chris Jacke kick). Tied 17–17.

**Overtime**

- ARI – Chris Jacke 32-yard field goal. Cardinals 20–17.

**Top passers**

- ARI – Jake Plummer – 18/26, 234 yards, TD, INT
- PHI – Koy Detmer – 16/28, 219 yards, TD, INT

**Top rushers**

- ARI – Adrian Murrell – 32 rushes, 174 yards
- PHI – Duce Staley – 30 rushes, 141 yards, TD

**Top receivers**

- ARI – Rob Moore – 7 receptions, 109 yards, TD
- PHI – Jeff Graham – 3 receptions, 63 yards

==== Week 16: vs. New Orleans Saints ====
Week 16: New Orleans Saints at Arizona Cardinals – Game summary

Quarter	1	2	3	4	Total
Saints	0	10	0	7	**17**
**Cardinals**	3	3	7	6	**19**

at Sun Devil Stadium, Tempe, Arizona

- Date: December 20
- Game time: 2:15 p.m. MST
- Game weather: 57 °F (14 °C)
- Game attendance: 51,617
- TV announcers (Fox): Tim Ryan, Bill Maas, Ronnie Lott, & Kevin McCabe
- Box Score

Game information

**First quarter**

- ARI – Chris Jacke 21-yard field goal. Cardinals 3–0.

**Second quarter**

- NO – Sammy Knight 39-yard interception return (Doug Brien kick). Saints 7–3.
- ARI – Chris Jacke 38-yard field goal. Saints 7–6.
- NO – Doug Brien 28-yard field goal. Saints 10–6.

**Third quarter**

- ARI – Adrian Murrell 29-yard run (Chris Jacke kick). Cardinals 13–10.

**Fourth quarter**

- ARI – Chris Jacke 46-yard field goal. Cardinals 16–10.
- NO – Cam Cleeland 13-yard pass from Kerry Collins (Doug Brien kick). Saints 17–16.
- ARI – Chris Jacke 36-yard field goal. Cardinals 19–16.

**Top passers**

- NO – Kerry Collins – 25/43, 265 yards, TD
- ARI – Jake Plummer – 32/44, 394 yards, INT

**Top rushers**

- NO – Aaron Craver – 7 rushes, 45 yards
- ARI – Adrian Murrell – 19 rushes, 65 yards, TD

**Top receivers**

- NO – Sean Dawkins – 7 receptions, 77 yards
- ARI – Frank Sanders – 10 receptions, 138 yards

==== Week 17: vs. San Diego Chargers ====
Week 17: San Diego Chargers at Arizona Cardinals – Game summary

Quarter	1	2	3	4	Total
Chargers	0	3	0	10	**13**
**Cardinals**	7	3	3	3	**16**

at Sun Devil Stadium, Tempe, Arizona

- Date: December 27
- Game time: 2:15 p.m. MST
- Game weather: 53 °F (12 °C)
- Game attendance: 71,670
- TV announcers (CBS): Don Criqui & Beasley Reece
- Box Score

Game information

**First quarter**

- ARI – Adrian Murrell 4-yard run (Chris Jacke kick). Cardinals 7–0.

**Second quarter**

- ARI – Chris Jacke 37-yard field goal. Cardinals 10–0.
- SD – John Carney 31-yard field goal. Cardinals 10–3.

**Third quarter**

- ARI – Chris Jacke 36-yard field goal. Cardinals 13–3.

**Fourth quarter**

- SD – John Carney 26-yard field goal. Cardinals 13–6.
- SD – Ryan Thelwell 30-yard pass from Craig Whelihan (John Carney kick). Tied 13–13.
- ARI – Chris Jacke 52-yard field goal. Cardinals 16–13.

**Top passers**

- SD – Craig Whelihan – 16/40, 214 yards, TD, 4 INT
- ARI – Jake Plummer – 20/41, 274 yards

**Top rushers**

- SD – Terrell Fletcher – 23 rushes, 127 yards
- ARI – Adrian Murrell – 18 rushes, 25 yards, TD

**Top receivers**

- SD – Ryan Thelwell – 5 receptions, 84 yards, TD
- ARI – Frank Sanders – 8 receptions, 106 yards

=== Standings ===
NFC East
	W	L	T	PCT	PF	PA	STK
^{(3)} Dallas Cowboys	10	6	0	.625	381	275	W2
^{(6)} Arizona Cardinals	9	7	0	.563	325	378	W3
New York Giants	8	8	0	.500	287	309	W4
Washington Redskins	6	10	0	.375	319	421	L1
Philadelphia Eagles	3	13	0	.188	161	344	L3

=== Postseason ===
Round	Date	Opponent (seed)	Result	Record	Venue
Wild Card	January 2, 1999	at Dallas Cowboys (3)	**W** 20–7	1–0	Texas Stadium
Divisional	January 10, 1999	at Minnesota Vikings (1)	**L** 21–41	1–1	Hubert H. Humphrey Metrodome

==== NFC Wild Card Round: at (3) Dallas Cowboys ====
NFC Wild Card Round: (6) Arizona Cardinals at (3) Dallas Cowboys – Game summary

Quarter	1	2	3	4	Total
**Cardinals**	7	3	7	3	**20**
Cowboys	0	0	0	7	**7**

at Texas Stadium, Irving, Texas

- Date: January 2
- Game time: 3:00 p.m. CST/2:00 p.m. MST
- Game weather: Clear, 43 °F (6 °C)
- Game attendance: 62,969
- Referee: Bernie Kukar
- TV announcers (ABC/Westwood One): Mike Patrick (play-by-play), Joe Theismann, Paul Maguire (color commentators), and Solomon Wilcots (sideline reporter)/Joel Meyers (play-by-play) and Matt Millen (color commentator)
- Box Score

Game information

**First quarter**

- ARI – Adrian Murrell 12-yard pass from Jake Plummer (Chris Jacke kick). Cardinals 7–0.

**Second quarter**

- ARI – Chris Jacke 37-yard field goal. Cardinals 10–0.

**Third quarter**

- ARI – Larry Centers 3-yard pass from Jake Plummer (Chris Jacke kick). Cardinals 17–0.

**Fourth quarter**

- ARI – Chris Jacke 46-yard field goal. Cardinals 20–0.
- DAL – Billy Davis 6-yard pass from Troy Aikman (Richie Cunningham kick). Cardinals 20–7.

**Top passers**

- ARI – Jake Plummer – 19/36, 213 yards, 2 TD, 2 INT
- DAL – Troy Aikman – 22/49, 191 yards, TD, 3 INT

**Top rushers**

- ARI – Adrian Murrell – 12 rushes, 95 yards
- DAL – Emmitt Smith – 16 rushes, 74 yards

**Top receivers**

- ARI – Frank Sanders – 3 receptions, 72 yards
- DAL – Patrick Jeffers – 7 receptions, 92 yards

Quarterback Jake Plummer passed for 213 yards and two touchdowns as he led the Cardinals to their first playoff victory since 1947.

==== NFC Divisional Round: at (1) Minnesota Vikings ====
NFC Divisional Round: (6) Arizona Cardinals at (1) Minnesota Vikings – Game summary

Quarter	1	2	3	4	Total
Cardinals	0	7	7	7	**21**
**Vikings**	7	17	10	7	**41**

at Hubert H. Humphrey Metrodome, Minneapolis, Minnesota

- Date: January 10
- Game time: 3:15 p.m. CST/2:15 p.m. MST
- Game weather: None (Indoor stadium)
- Game attendance: 63,760
- Referee: Tom White
- TV announcers (Fox/Westwood One): Pat Summerall (play-by-play), John Madden (color commentator), and Ron Pitts (sideline reporter)/John Rooney (play-by-play) and Matt Millen (color commentator)
- Box Score

Game information

**First quarter**

- MIN – Leroy Hoard 1-yard run (Gary Anderson kick). Vikings 7–0.

**Second quarter**

- MIN – Andrew Glover 15-yard pass from Randall Cunningham (Gary Anderson kick). Vikings 14–0.
- MIN – Gary Anderson 34-yard field goal. Vikings 17–0.
- ARI – Mario Bates 1-yard run (Chris Jacke kick). Vikings 17–7.
- MIN – Leroy Hoard 16-yard pass from Randall Cunningham (Gary Anderson kick). Vikings 24–7.

**Third quarter**

- ARI – Mario Bates 1-yard run (Chris Jacke kick). Vikings 24–14.
- MIN – Gary Anderson 20-yard field goal. Vikings 27–14.
- MIN – Randy Moss 2-yard pass from Randall Cunningham (Gary Anderson kick). Vikings 34–14.

**Fourth quarter**

- ARI – Mario Bates 1-yard run (Chris Jacke kick). Vikings 34–21.
- MIN – Leroy Hoard 6-yard run (Gary Anderson kick). Vikings 41–21.

**Top passers**

- ARI – Jake Plummer – 23/41, 242 yards, 2 INT
- MIN – Randall Cunningham – 17/27, 236 yards, 3 TD, INT

**Top rushers**

- ARI – Adrian Murrell – 15 rushes, 62 yards
- MIN – Robert Smith – 19 rushes, 124 yards

**Top receivers**

- ARI – Rob Moore – 6 receptions, 91 yards
- MIN – Cris Carter – 5 receptions, 82 yards

== Awards and records ==
- Kwamie Lassiter, NFC Leader in Interceptions, 8
- Kwamie Lassiter, Tied NFL Record, Most Interceptions in One Game, 4 (Achieved on December 27)
- Frank Sanders, Led NFC in Receptions, 89
