= 1999 Arizona Cardinals season =

NFL team season

- Owner: Bill Bidwill
- Head coach: Vince Tobin
- Offensive coordinator: Marc Trestman
- Defensive coordinator: Dave McGinnis
- Home stadium: Sun Devil Stadium

Results
- Record: 6–10
- Division place: 4th NFC East
- Playoffs: Did not qualify
- Pro Bowlers: DE Simeon Rice; CB Aeneas Williams

The 1999 Arizona Cardinals season was the franchise's 101st season, 80th season in the National Football League and the 12th in Arizona. The team was unable to match their previous output of 9–7, instead winning only six games. The Cardinals would fail to return to the playoffs and would not return until the 2008 season.

== Offseason ==
=== Free agents ===
Position	Player	Free agency tag	1999 team
DB	Tommy Bennett	RFA	Arizona Cardinals
T	Lomas Brown	UFA	Cleveland Browns
QB	Stoney Case	UFA	Baltimore Ravens
C	Mike Devlin	UFA	Arizona Cardinals
T	James Dexter	RFA	Arizona Cardinals
WR	Anthony Edwards	UFA	
C	Aaron Graham	RFA	Arizona Cardinals
K	Chris Jacke	UFA	Arizona Cardinals
G	Matt Joyce	RFA	Arizona Cardinals
DB	Kwamie Lassiter	UFA	Arizona Cardinals
LB	Mark Maddox	UFA	Arizona Cardinals
LB	Ronald McKinnon	RFA	Arizona Cardinals
TE	Johnny McWilliams	RFA	Arizona Cardinals
WR	Eric Metcalf	UFA	Carolina Panthers
LB	Jamir Miller	UFA	Cleveland Browns
WR	Rob Moore	Franchise	Arizona Cardinals
LB	Patrick Sapp	RFA	Arizona Cardinals
DT	Carl Simpson	UFA	Arizona Cardinals
RB	Cedric Smith	UFA	
DT	Bernard Wilson	UFA	

Additions	Subtractions
LB Rob Fredrickson (Lions)	OT J. B. Brown (Lions)
	FB Larry Centers (Redskins)
QB Cory Sauter (Lions)

=== NFL draft ===
1999 Arizona Cardinals draft
Round	Pick	Player	Position	College	Notes
1	9	David Boston *	Wide receiver	Ohio State	from San Diego
1	21	L. J. Shelton	Tackle	Eastern Michigan	
2	51	Johnny Rutledge	Linebacker	Florida	
3	83	Tom Burke	Defensive end	Wisconsin	
4	116	Joel Makovicka	Fullback	Nebraska	
5	155	Paris Johnson	Safety	Miami	
5	168	Yusuf Scott	Guard	Arizona	
6	190	Coby Rhinehart	Cornerback	SMU	
6	202	Melvin Bradley	Linebacker	Arkansas	
6	206	Dennis McKinley	Fullback	Mississippi State	
7	239	Chris Greisen	Quarterback	NW Missouri State	
Made roster * Made at least one Pro Bowl during career

== Personnel ==
1999 Arizona Cardinals staff
Front office: President – Bill Bidwill; Vice president – Larry Wilson; Vice president and general counsel – Michael Bidwill; General manager – Bob Ferguson; Assistant to the president – Rod Graves; Head coaches: Head coach – Vince Tobin; Offensive coaches: Offensive coordinator – Marc Trestman; Quarterbacks – John Garrett; Running backs – Johnny Roland; Wide receivers – Vic Rapp; Tight ends – Hank Kuhlmann; Offensive line – George Warhop	Defensive coaches: Defensive coordinator – Dave McGinnis; Defensive line – Joe Greene; Linebackers – Glenn Pires; Defensive backs – Larry Marmie; Special teams coaches: Special teams – Al Everest; Strength and conditioning: Strength and conditioning – Bob Rogucki

== Roster ==
1999 Arizona Cardinals roster
Quarterbacks (QB): 17 Dave Brown; 15 Chris Greisen; 16 Jake Plummer; Running backs (RB): 24 Mario Bates KR; 34 Joel Makovicka; 39 Dennis McKinley FB; 29 Adrian Murrell; 32 Michael Pittman; Wide receivers (WR): 89 David Boston PR; 82 Mac Cody PR; 19 MarTay Jenkins; 84 Andy McCullough; 85 Rob Moore; 81 Frank Sanders; Tight ends (TE): 83 Derek Brown; 80 Terry Hardy; 87 Johnny McWilliams	Offensive linemen (OL): 65 Anthony Clement T; 62 Mike Devlin C; 64 James Dexter T; 67 Chris Dishman G; 54 Aaron Graham C; 71 Lester Holmes G; 75 Matt Joyce G/T; 68 Yusuf Scott G; 70 L. J. Shelton T; Defensive linemen (DL): 60 Tom Burke DE; 76 Jerry Drake DT; 96 Brad Ottis DE; 97 Simeon Rice DE; 78 Angel Rubio DT; 94 Corey Sears DT; 98 Eric Swann DT; 90 Andre Wadsworth DE	Linebackers (LB): 56 Melvin Bradley MLB; 58 James Folston OLB; 59 Rob Fredrickson OLB; 53 Mark Maddox; 57 Ronald McKinnon MLB; 51 Johnny Rutledge MLB; 55 Patrick Sapp OLB; Defensive backs (DB): 28 Tommy Bennett SS; 25 Corey Chavous CB; 22 Tom Knight CB; 42 Kwamie Lassiter FS; 41 Justin Lucas CB/S; 44 J. J. McCleskey CB; 23 Coby Rhinehart CB; 40 Pat Tillman S; 35 Aeneas Williams CB; Special teams (ST): 13 Chris Jacke K; 86 Trey Junkin LS; 10 Scott Player P	Practice squad: 79 Jon Clark T; 5 Tywan Mitchell WR; 21 Clarence Williams RB; Reserve: 72 Jerome Daniels G/T (IR); -- Ernest Dye T (NF-Inj.); 46 Paris Johnson S (IR); 74 Mike Moten DE (IR); 93 Mark Smith DT (IR); 91 Rashod Swinger DT (IR); 52 Zack Walz LB (IR); Rookies in italics 53 active, 7 reserve, 3 practice squad

== Regular season ==
=== Schedule ===
Week	Date	Opponent	Result	Record	Venue	Attendance
1	September 12	at **Philadelphia Eagles**	**W** 25–24	1–0	Veterans Stadium	64,113
2	September 19	at Miami Dolphins	**L** 16–19	1–1	Pro Player Stadium	73,618
3	September 27	San Francisco 49ers	**L** 10–24	1–2	Sun Devil Stadium	72,100
4	October 3	at **Dallas Cowboys**	**L** 7–35	1–3	Texas Stadium	64,169
5	October 10	**New York Giants**	**W** 14–3	2–3	Sun Devil Stadium	49,015
6	October 17	**Washington Redskins**	**L** 10–24	2–4	Sun Devil Stadium	55,893
7	Bye					
8	October 31	New England Patriots	**L** 3–27	2–5	Sun Devil Stadium	55,830
9	November 7	at New York Jets	**L** 7–12	2–6	Giants Stadium	77,857
10	November 14	Detroit Lions	**W** 23–19	3–6	Sun Devil Stadium	49,600
11	November 21	**Dallas Cowboys**	**W** 13–9	4–6	Sun Devil Stadium	72,015
12	November 28	at **New York Giants**	**W** 34–24	5–6	Giants Stadium	77,809
13	December 5	**Philadelphia Eagles**	**W** 21–17	6–6	Sun Devil Stadium	46,550
14	December 12	at **Washington Redskins**	**L** 3–28	6–7	Jack Kent Cooke Stadium	75,851
15	December 19	Buffalo Bills	**L** 21–31	6–8	Sun Devil Stadium	64,337
16	December 26	at Atlanta Falcons	**L** 14–37	6–9	Georgia Dome	47,074
17	January 2, 2000	at Green Bay Packers	**L** 24–49	6–10	Lambeau Field	59,818
Note: Intra-division opponents are in **bold** text.

=== Game summaries ===
==== Week 1: at Philadelphia Eagles ====
Week 1: Arizona Cardinals at Philadelphia Eagles – Game summary

Quarter	1	2	3	4	Total
**Cardinals**	0	6	6	13	**25**
Eagles	21	3	0	0	**24**

at Veterans Stadium, Philadelphia, Pennsylvania

- Date: September 12
- Game time: 3:05 p.m. CST/2:05 p.m. MST
- Game weather: 75 °F (24 °C)
- Game attendance: 64,113
- Referee: Ron Winter
- TV announcers (Fox): Curt Menefee, Brian Baldinger, Don Tollefson
- Box Score

Game information

**First quarter**

- PHI – Duce Staley 24-yard run (Norm Johnson kick), 7:53. Eagles 7–0.
- PHI – Duce Staley 3-yard pass from Doug Pederson (Norm Johnson kick), 2:19. Eagles 14–0.
- PHI – Luther Broughton 15-yard pass from Doug Pederson (Norm Johnson kick), 0:16. Eagles 21–0.

**Second quarter**

- ARI – Chris Jacke 31-yard field goal, 8:11. Eagles 21–3.
- ARI – Chris Jacke 25-yard field goal, 5:15. Eagles 21–6.
- PHI – Norm Johnson 25-yard field goal, 0:00. Eagles 24–6.

**Third quarter**

- ARI – Mario Bates 1-yard run (pass failed), 15:00. Eagles 24–12.

**Fourth quarter**

- ARI – Chris Jacke 32-yard field goal, 15:00. Eagles 24–15.
- ARI – Rob Moore 20-yard pass from Jake Plummer (Chris Jacke kick), 6:26. Eagles 24–22.
- ARI – Chris Jacke 31-yard field goal, 0:04. Cardinals 25–24.

**Top passers**

- ARI – Jake Plummer – 25/48, 274 yards, TD, 3 INT
- PHI – Doug Pederson – 12/26, 91 yards, 2 TD, 2 INT

**Top rushers**

- ARI – Adrian Murrell – 24 rushes, 53 yards
- PHI – Duce Staley – 21 rushes, 111 yards, TD

**Top receivers**

- ARI – Rob Moore – 3 receptions, 77 yards, TD
- PHI – Luther Broughton – 3 receptions, 29 yards, TD

==== Week 2: at Miami Dolphins ====
Week 2: Arizona Cardinals at Miami Dolphins – Game summary

Quarter	1	2	3	4	Total
Cardinals	0	13	3	0	**16**
**Dolphins**	3	10	6	0	**19**

at Pro Player Stadium, Miami, Florida

- Date: September 19
- Game time: 1:00 p.m. EST/11:00 a.m. MST
- Game weather: 82 °F (28 °C)
- Game attendance: 73,618
- Referee: Bob McElwee
- TV announcers (Fox): Ray Bentley, Ron Pitts
- Box Score

Game information

**First quarter**

- MIA – Olindo Mare 39-yard field goal, 5:53. Dolphins 3–0.

**Second quarter**

- MIA – Olindo Mare 51-yard field goal, 14:09. Dolphins 6–0.
- ARI – Chris Jacke 36-yard field goal, 6:54. Dolphins 6–3.
- ARI – Chris Jacke 44-yard field goal, 5:44. Tied 6–6.
- ARI – Rob Fredrickson 34-yard interception return (Chris Jacke kick), 5:20. Cardinals 13–6.
- MIA – Troy Drayton 10-yard pass from Dan Marino (Olindo Mare kick), 0:25. Tied 13–13.

**Third quarter**

- ARI – Chris Jacke 38-yard field goal, 9:12. Cardinals 16–13.
- MIA – Olindo Mare 48-yard field goal, 5:11. Tied 16–16.
- MIA – Olindo Mare 44-yard field goal, 4:26. Dolphins 19–16.

**Fourth quarter**

- No scoring plays

**Top passers**

- ARI – Jake Plummer – 11/27, 112 yards, 4 INT
- MIA – Dan Marino – 21/35, 221 yards, TD, 2 INT

**Top rushers**

- ARI – Adrian Murrell – 20 rushes, 59 yards
- MIA – Cecil Collins – 15 rushes, 45 yards

**Top receivers**

- ARI – Frank Sanders – 7 receptions, 76 yards
- MIA – O.J. McDuffie – 4 receptions, 85 yards

==== Week 3: vs. San Francisco 49ers ====
Week 3: San Francisco 49ers at Arizona Cardinals – Game summary

Quarter	1	2	3	4	Total
**49ers**	14	3	0	7	**24**
Cardinals	0	0	10	0	**10**

at Sun Devil Stadium, Tempe, Arizona

- Date: September 26
- Game time: 9:00 p.m. MST
- Game weather: 97 °F (36 °C)
- Game attendance: 72,100
- Referee: Tony Corrente
- TV announcers (ABC): Al Michaels, Boomer Esiason, Lesley Visser
- Box Score

Game information

**First quarter**

- SF – Jerry Rice 13-yard pass from Steve Young (Wade Richey kick), 6:41. 49ers 7–0.
- SF – Charlie Garner 11-yard run (Wade Richey kick), 5:47. 49ers 14–0.

**Second quarter**

- SF – Wade Richey 33-yard field goal, 9:01. 49ers 17–0.

**Third quarter**

- ARI – Mario Bates 1-yard run (Chris Jacke kick), 9:45. 49ers 17–7.
- ARI – Chris Jacke 43-yard field goal, 1:09. 49ers 17–10.

**Fourth quarter**

- SF – Lawrence Phillips 68-yard run (Wade Richey kick), 1:42. 49ers 24–10.

**Top passers**

- SF – Steve Young – 13/23, 92 yards, TD, INT
- ARI – Jake Plummer – 16/31, 176 yards, 2 INT

**Top rushers**

- SF – Lawrence Phillips – 9 rushes, 102 yards, TD
- ARI – Adrian Murrell – 16 rushes, 42 yards

**Top receivers**

- SF – Terrell Owens – 4 receptions, 59 yards
- ARI – Frank Sanders – 7 receptions, 74 yards

==== Week 4: at Dallas Cowboys ====
Week 4: Arizona Cardinals at Dallas Cowboys – Game summary

Quarter	1	2	3	4	Total
Cardinals	0	7	0	0	**7**
**Cowboys**	14	7	7	7	**35**

at Texas Stadium, Irving, Texas

- Date: October 3
- Game time: 12:05 p.m. CST/11:05 a.m. MST
- Game weather: 67 °F (19 °C)
- Game attendance: 64,169
- Referee: Bill Carollo
- TV announcers (Fox): Pat Summerall, John Madden, D.J. Johnson
- Box Score

Game information

**First quarter**

- DAL – George Teague 32-yard interception return (Richie Cunningham, 13:28. Cowboys 7–0.
- DAL – Michael Irvin 18-yard pass from Troy Aikman (Richie Cunningham kick), 3:19. Cowboys 14–0.

**Second quarter**

- DAL – Rocket Ismail 63-yard pass from Troy Aikman (Richie Cunningham kick), 12:01. Cowboys 21–0.
- ARI – Joel Makovicka 2-yard pass from Jake Plummer (Chris Jacke kick), 0:11. Cowboys 21–7.

**Third quarter**

- DAL – Emmitt Smith 1-yard run (Richie Cunningham kick), 7:59. Cowboys 28–7.

**Fourth quarter**

- DAL – Greg Ellis 98-yard fumble return (Richie Cunningham kick), 10:13. Cowboys 35–7.

**Top passers**

- ARI – Jake Plummer – 16/33, 111 yards, TD, 3 INT
- DAL – Troy Aikman – 15/21, 192 yards, 2 TD

**Top rushers**

- ARI – Adrian Murrell – 14 rushes, 44 yards
- DAL – Emmitt Smith – 22 rushes, 77 yards, TD

**Top receivers**

- ARI – Michael Pittman – 4 receptions, 42 yards
- DAL – Rocket Ismail – 4 receptions, 101 yards, TD

==== Week 5: vs. New York Giants ====
Week 5: New York Giants at Arizona Cardinals – Game summary

Quarter	1	2	3	4	Total
Giants	0	0	0	3	**3**
**Cardinals**	0	14	0	0	**14**

at Sun Devil Stadium, Tempe, Arizona

- Date: October 10
- Game time: 2:00 p.m. MST
- Game weather: 95 °F (35 °C)
- Game attendance: 49,015
- Referee: Tom White
- TV announcers (Fox): Dick Stockton, Matt Millen, Pam Oliver
- Box Score

Game information

**First quarter**

- No scoring plays

**Second quarter**

- ARI – Jake Plummer 1-yard run (Chris Jacke kick), 14:58. Cardinals 7–0.
- ARI – David Boston 11-yard pass from Jake Plummer (Chris Jacke kick), 0:33. Cardinals 14–0.

**Third quarter**

- No scoring plays

**Fourth quarter**

- NYG – Brad Daluiso 31-yard field goal, 10:13. Cardinals 14–3.

**Top passers**

- NYG – Kerry Collins – 24/38, 202 yards, INT
- ARI – Jake Plummer – 13/19, 156 yards, TD

**Top rushers**

- NYG – Gary Brown – 18 rushes, 67 yards
- ARI – Michael Pittman – 8 rushes, 20 yards

**Top receivers**

- NYG – Ike Hilliard – 5 receptions, 78 yards
- ARI – David Boston – 8 receptions, 101 yards, TD

==== Week 6: vs. Washington Redskins ====
Week 6: Washington Redskins at Arizona Cardinals – Game summary

Quarter	1	2	3	4	Total
**Redskins**	0	10	7	7	**24**
Cardinals	3	0	0	7	**10**

at Sun Devil Stadium, Tempe, Arizona

- Date: October 17
- Game time: 6:00 p.m. MST
- Game weather: 79 °F (26 °C)
- Game attendance: 55,893
- Referee: Gerry Austin
- TV announcers (ESPN): Mike Patrick, Joe Theismann, Paul Maguire, Solomon Wilcots
- Box Score

Game information

**First quarter**

- ARI – Chris Jacke 44-yard field goal, 3:15. Cardinals 3–0.

**Second quarter**

- WAS – Brett Conway 36-yard field goal, 7:50. Tied 3–3.
- WAS – Champ Bailey 59-yard interception return (Brett Conway kick), 3:33. Redskins 10–3.

**Third quarter**

- WAS – Stephen Alexander 1-yard pass from Brad Johnson (Brett Conway kick), 1:20. Redskins 17–3.

**Fourth quarter**

- ARI – Rob Moore 10-yard pass from Dave Brown (Chris Jacke kick), 6:59. Redskins 17–10.
- WAS – Skip Hicks 14-yard run (Brett Conway kick), 2:03. Redskins 24–10.

**Top passers**

- WAS – Brad Johnson – 24/40, 248 yards, TD, 2 INT
- ARI – Dave Brown – 8/20, 117 yards, TD, INT

**Top rushers**

- WAS – Stephen Davis – 18 rushes, 91 yards
- ARI – Adrian Murrell – 15 rushes, 51 yards

**Top receivers**

- WAS – Albert Connell – 8 receptions, 110 yards
- ARI – Frank Sanders – 3 receptions, 68 yards

==== Week 8: vs. New England Patriots ====
Week 8: New England Patriots at Arizona Cardinals – Game summary

Quarter	1	2	3	4	Total
**Patriots**	14	6	0	7	**27**
Cardinals	0	0	3	0	**3**

at Sun Devil Stadium, Tempe, Arizona

- Date: October 31
- Game time: 2:00 p.m. MST
- Game weather: 88 °F (31 °C)
- Game attendance: 55,830
- Referee: Johnny Grier
- TV announcers (CBS): Kevin Harlan, Sam Wyche
- Box Score

Game information

**First quarter**

- NE – Lamont Warren 3-yard pass from Drew Bledsoe (Adam Vinatieri kick), 8:56. Patriots 7–0.
- NE – Shawn Jefferson 64-yard pass from Drew Bledsoe (Adam Vinatieri kick), 1:13. Patriots 14–0.

**Second quarter**

- NE – Shawn Jefferson 35-yard pass from Drew Bledsoe (kick failed), 4:45. Patriots 20–0.

**Third quarter**

- ARI – Chris Jacke 24-yard field goal, 9:57. Patriots 20–3.

**Fourth quarter**

- NE – Terry Glenn 36-yard pass from Drew Bledsoe (Adam Vinatieri kick), 14:20. Patriots 27–3.

**Top passers**

- NE – Drew Bledsoe – 14/22, 276 yards, 4 TD
- ARI – Dave Brown – 12/33, 107 yards, 2 INT

**Top rushers**

- NE – Terry Allen – 21 rushes, 88 yards
- ARI – Adrian Murrell – 13 rushes, 47 yards

**Top receivers**

- NE – Shawn Jefferson – 3 receptions, 113 yards, 2 TD
- ARI – Frank Sanders – 4 receptions, 34 yards

==== Week 9: at New York Jets ====
Week 9: Arizona Cardinals at New York Jets – Game summary

Quarter	1	2	3	4	Total
Cardinals	0	7	0	0	**7**
**Jets**	3	0	3	6	**12**

at Giants Stadium, East Rutherford, New Jersey

- Date: November 7
- Game time: 1:05 p.m. EST/11:05 a.m. MST
- Game weather: 48 °F (9 °C)
- Game attendance: 77,857
- Referee: Ron Blum
- TV announcers (Fox): Kenny Albert, Tim Green
- Box Score

Game information

**First quarter**

- NYJ – John Hall 44-yard field goal, 6:38. Jets 3–0.

**Second quarter**

- ARI – Michael Pittman 4-yard run (Chris Jacke kick), 5:09. Cardinals 7–3.

**Third quarter**

- NYJ – John Hall 33-yard field goal, 3:07. Cardinals 7–6.

**Fourth quarter**

- NYJ – Keyshawn Johnson 43-yard pass from Rick Mirer (pass failed), 5:21. Jets 12–7.

**Top passers**

- ARI – Dave Brown – 16/26, 199 yards
- NYJ – Rick Mirer – 12/18, 122 yards, TD

**Top rushers**

- ARI – Michael Pittman – 9 rushes, 41 yards, TD
- NYJ – Curtis Martin – 38 rushes, 131 yards

**Top receivers**

- ARI – Rob Moore – 3 receptions, 98 yards
- NYJ – Keyshawn Johnson – 2 receptions, 51 yards, TD

==== Week 10: vs. Detroit Lions ====
Week 10: Detroit Lions at Arizona Cardinals – Game summary

Quarter	1	2	3	4	Total
Lions	7	0	6	6	**19**
**Cardinals**	3	13	7	0	**23**

at Sun Devil Stadium, Tempe, Arizona

- Date: November 14
- Game time: 2:15 p.m. MST
- Game weather: 89 °F (32 °C)
- Game attendance: 49,600
- Referee: Mike Carey
- TV announcers (Fox): Curt Menefee, Brian Baldinger, Kevin McCabe
- Box Score

Game information

**First quarter**

- DET – David Sloan 7-yard pass from Gus Frerotte (Jason Hanson kick), 10:44. Lions 7–0.
- ARI – Chris Jacke 35-yard field goal, 7:59. Lions 7–3.

**Second quarter**

- ARI – Mario Bates 3-yard run (Chris Jacke kick), 13:18. Cardinals 10–7.
- ARI – Chris Jacke 35-yard field goal, 5:11. Cardinals 13–7.
- ARI – Chris Jacke 49-yard field goal, 0:00. Cardinals 16–7.

**Third quarter**

- ARI – Michael Pittman 58-yard run (Chris Jacke kick), 11:11. Cardinals 23–7.
- DET – Germane Crowell 77-yard pass from Gus Frerotte (pass failed), 10:51. Cardinals 23–13.

**Fourth quarter**

- DET – Terry Fair 35-yard fumble return (pass failed), 5:26. Cardinals 23–19.

**Top passers**

- DET – Gus Frerotte – 24/39, 375 yards, 2 TD
- ARI – Dave Brown – 16/30, 209 yards

**Top rushers**

- DET – Greg Hill – 10 rushes, 25 yards
- ARI – Michael Pittman – 23 rushes, 133 yards, TD

**Top receivers**

- DET – Germane Crowell – 5 receptions, 142 yards, TD
- ARI – Frank Sanders – 5 receptions, 86 yards

==== Week 11: vs. Dallas Cowboys ====
Week 11: Dallas Cowboys at Arizona Cardinals – Game summary

Quarter	1	2	3	4	Total
Cowboys	7	0	0	2	**9**
**Cardinals**	0	3	7	3	**13**

at Sun Devil Stadium, Tempe, Arizona

- Date: November 21
- Game time: 2:15 p.m. MST
- Game weather: 70 °F (21 °C)
- Game attendance: 72,015
- Referee: Ron Winter
- TV announcers (Fox): Sam Rosen, Bill Maas, Kevin McCabe
- Box Score

Game information

**First quarter**

- DAL – David LaFleur 11-yard pass from Jason Garrett (Richie Cunningham kick), 0:58. Cowboys 7–0.

**Second quarter**

- ARI – Chris Jacke 24-yard field goal, 0:15. Cowboys 7–3.

**Third quarter**

- ARI – Rob Moore 21-yard pass from Dave Brown (Chris Jacke kick), 13:10. Cardinals 10–7.

**Fourth quarter**

- ARI – Chris Jacke 38-yard field goal, 11:30. Cardinals 13–7.
- DAL – Team safety, 1:49. Cardinals 13–9.

**Top passers**

- DAL – Jason Garrett – 16/29, 111 yards, TD
- ARI – Dave Brown – 13/29, 115 yards, TD, 2 INT

**Top rushers**

- DAL – Emmitt Smith – 29 rushes, 127 yards
- ARI – Adrian Murrell – 17 rushes, 72 yards

**Top receivers**

- DAL – Rocket Ismail – 5 receptions, 43 yards
- ARI – David Boston – 3 receptions, 47 yards

==== Week 12: at New York Giants ====
Week 12: Arizona Cardinals at New York Giants – Game summary

Quarter	1	2	3	4	Total
**Cardinals**	3	3	7	21	**34**
Giants	0	10	0	14	**24**

at Giants Stadium, East Rutherford, New Jersey

- Date: November 28
- Game time: 1:03 p.m. EST/11:03 a.m. MST
- Game weather: 48 °F (9 °C)
- Game attendance: 77,809
- Referee: Larry Nemmers
- TV announcers (Fox): Pat Summerall, John Madden, D.J. Johnson
- Box Score

Game information

**First quarter**

- ARI – Chris Jacke 39-yard field goal, 5:54. Cardinals 3–0.

**Second quarter**

- NYG – Kerry Collins 1-yard run (Cary Blanchard kick), 6:24. Giants 7–3.
- ARI – Chris Jacke 20-yard field goal, 1:51. Giants 7–6.
- NYG – Cary Blanchard 24-yard field goal, 0:02. Giants 10–6.

**Third quarter**

- ARI – Rob Moore 2-yard pass from Jake Plummer (Chris Jacke kick), 11:50. Cardinals 13–10.

**Fourth quarter**

- ARI – Johnny McWilliams 9-yard pass from Jake Plummer (Chris Jacke kick), 14:55. Cardinals 20–10.
- NYG – Sean Bennett 1-yard run (Cary Blanchard kick), 8:51. Cardinals 20–17.
- ARI – Mario Bates 2-yard run (Chris Jacke kick), 4:16. Cardinals 27–17.
- ARI – Eric Swann 44-yard interception return (Chris Jacke kick), 1:57. Cardinals 34–17.
- NYG – Tiki Barber 34-yard pass from Kerry Collins (Cary Blanchard kick), 0:42. Cardinals 34–24.

**Top passers**

- ARI – Dave Brown – 11/17, 126 yards
- NYG – Kerry Collins – 22/45, 298 yards, TD, 3 INT

**Top rushers**

- ARI – Mario Bates – 16 rushes, 37 yards, TD
- NYG – Tiki Barber – 10 rushes, 37 yards

**Top receivers**

- ARI – Rob Moore – 7 receptions, 102 yards, TD
- NYG – Amani Toomer – 6 receptions, 87 yards

==== Week 13: vs. Philadelphia Eagles ====
Week 13: Philadelphia Eagles at Arizona Cardinals – Game summary

Quarter	1	2	3	4	Total
Eagles	0	14	3	0	**17**
**Cardinals**	7	0	0	14	**21**

at Sun Devil Stadium, Tempe, Arizona

- Date: December 5
- Game time: 2:05 p.m. MST
- Game weather: 65 °F (18 °C)
- Game attendance: 46,550
- Referee: Tom White
- TV announcers (Fox): Kenny Albert, Tim Green, Kevin McCabe
- Box Score

Game information

**First quarter**

- ARI – Kwamie Lassiter 78-yard interception return (Chris Jacke kick), 5:24. Cardinals 7–0.

**Second quarter**

- PHI – Chad Lewis 11-yard pass from Donovan McNabb (Norm Johnson kick), 7:56. Tied 7–7.
- PHI – Dameane Douglas 29-yard pass from Donovan McNabb (Norm Johnson kick), 0:43. Eagles 14–7.

**Third quarter**

- PHI – Norm Johnson 29-yard field goal, 5:31. Eagles 17–7.

**Fourth quarter**

- ARI – David Boston 4-yard pass from Jake Plummer (Chris Jacke kick), 4:31. Eagles 17–14.
- ARI – Jake Plummer 1-yard run (Chris Jacke kick), 0:57. Cardinals 21–17.

**Top passers**

- PHI – Donovan McNabb – 19/31, 157 yards, 2 TD, INT
- ARI – Jake Plummer – 20/37, 179 yards, TD, INT

**Top rushers**

- PHI – Duce Staley – 25 rushes, 72 yards
- ARI – Adrian Murrell – 8 rushes, 24 yards

**Top receivers**

- PHI – Dameane Douglas – 3 receptions, 47 yards, TD
- ARI – Frank Sanders – 6 receptions, 72 yards

==== Week 14: at Washington Redskins ====
Week 14: Arizona Cardinals at Washington Redskins – Game summary

Quarter	1	2	3	4	Total
Cardinals	3	0	0	0	**3**
**Redskins**	7	14	0	7	**28**

at Jack Kent Cooke Stadium, Landover, Maryland

- Date: December 12
- Game time: 1:00 p.m. EST/11:00 a.m. MST
- Game weather: 53 °F (12 °C)
- Game attendance: 75,851
- Referee: Tony Corrente
- TV announcers (Fox): Dick Stockton, Matt Millen, Pam Oliver
- Box Score

Game information

**First quarter**

- WAS – Stephen Davis 50-yard run (Brett Conway kick), 10:52. Redskins 7–0.
- ARI – Chris Jacke 31-yard field goal, 3:12. Redskins 7–3.

**Second quarter**

- WAS – Irving Fryar 7-yard pass from Brad Johnson (Brett Conway kick), 12:53. Redskins 14–3.
- WAS – Michael Westbrook 25-yard pass from Brad Johnson (Brett Conway kick), 0:11. Redskins 21–3.

**Third quarter**

- No scoring plays

**Fourth quarter**

- WAS – Skip Hicks 11-yard run (Brett Conway kick), 2:39. Redskins 28–3.

**Top passers**

- ARI – Jake Plummer – 15/32, 147 yards, 3 INT
- WAS – Brad Johnson – 17/31, 191 yards, 2 TD, 2 INT

**Top rushers**

- ARI – Adrian Murrell – 8 rushes, 41 yards
- WAS – Stephen Davis – 37 rushes, 189 yards, TD

**Top receivers**

- ARI – Adrian Murrell – 4 receptions, 44 yards
- WAS – Albert Connell – 3 receptions, 54 yards

==== Week 15: vs. Buffalo Bills ====
Week 15: Buffalo Bills at Arizona Cardinals – Game summary

Quarter	1	2	3	4	Total
**Bills**	14	0	3	14	**31**
**Cardinals**	0	14	0	7	**21**

at Sun Devil Stadium, Tempe, Arizona

- Date: December 19
- Game time: 4:20 p.m. MST
- Game weather: 64 °F (18 °C)
- Game attendance: 64,337
- Referee: Johnny Grier
- TV announcers (ESPN): Mike Patrick, Joe Theismann, Paul Maguire, Solomon Wilcots
- Box Score

Game information

**First quarter**

- BUF – Eric Moulds 15-yard pass from Doug Flutie (Steve Christie kick), 11:36. Bills 7–0.
- BUF – Jonathan Linton 6-yard run (Steve Christie kick), 1:03. Bills 14–0.

**Second quarter**

- ARI – Mario Bates 1-yard run (Chris Jacke kick), 9:31. Bills 14–7.
- ARI – Mario Bates 2-yard run (Chris Jacke kick), 1:15. Tied 14–14.

**Third quarter**

- BUF – Steve Christie 33-yard field goal, 4:07. Bills 17–14.

**Fourth quarter**

- BUF – Jay Riemersma 4-yard pass from Doug Flutie (Steve Christie kick), 3:01. Bills 24–14.
- ARI – Rob Moore 26-yard pass from Jake Plummer (Chris Jacke kick), 1:49. Bills 24–21.
- BUF – Henry Jones 37-yard kickoff return (Steve Christie kick), 1:44. Bills 31–21.

**Top passers**

- BUF – Doug Flutie – 21/32, 239 yards, 2 TD, 2 INT
- ARI – Jake Plummer – 11/30, 119 yards, TD, INT

**Top rushers**

- BUF – Jonathan Linton – 21 rushes, 81 yards, TD
- ARI – Adrian Murrell – 12 rushes, 47 yards

**Top receivers**

- BUF – Eric Moulds – 6 receptions, 73 yards, TD
- ARI – Frank Sanders – 5 receptions, 57 yards

==== Week 16: at Atlanta Falcons ====
Week 16: Arizona Cardinals at Atlanta Falcons – Game summary

Quarter	1	2	3	4	Total
Cardinals	0	14	0	0	**14**
**Falcons**	7	13	7	10	**37**

at Georgia Dome, Atlanta, Georgia

- Date: December 26
- Game time: 1:00 p.m. EST/11:00 a.m. MST
- Game weather: None (Indoor stadium)
- Game attendance: 47,074
- Referee: Gerry Austin
- TV announcers (FOX): Curt Menefee, Brian Baldinger, Kevin McCabe
- Box Score

Game information

**First quarter**

- ATL – Terance Mathis 23-yard pass from Chris Chandler (Morten Andersen kick), 6:50. Falcons 7–0.

**Second quarter**

- ARI – Mario Bates 1-yard run (Chris Jacke kick), 14:10. Tied 7–7.
- ARI – Mario Bates 1-yard run (Chris Jacke kick), 8:18. Cardinals 14–7.
- ATL – Bob Christian 1-yard run (Morten Andersen kick), 4:39. Tied 14–14.
- ATL – Morten Andersen 28-yard field goal, 0:42. Falcons 17–14.
- ATL – Morten Andersen 24-yard field goal, 0:00. Falcons 20–14.

**Third quarter**

- ATL – Byron Hanspard 1-yard run (Morten Andersen kick), 4:39. Falcons 27–14.

**Fourth quarter**

- ATL – Bob Christian 33-yard run (Morten Andersen kick), 10:06. Falcons 34–14.
- ATL – Morten Andersen 41-yard field goal, 3:03. Falcons 37–14.

**Top passers**

- ARI – Jake Plummer – 15/26, 217 yards, 2 INT
- ATL – Chris Chandler – 14/23, 230 yards, TD

**Top rushers**

- ARI – Mario Bates – 14 rushes, 39 yards, 2 TD
- ATL – Byron Hanspard – 26 rushes, 102 yards, TD

**Top receivers**

- ARI – Frank Sanders – 3 receptions, 106 yards
- ATL – Tim Dwight – 3 receptions, 52 yards

==== Week 17: at Green Bay Packers ====
Week 17: Arizona Cardinals at Green Bay Packers – Game summary

Quarter	1	2	3	4	Total
Cardinals	0	3	7	14	**24**
**Packers**	7	7	14	21	**49**

at Lambeau Field, Green Bay, Wisconsin

- Date: January 2
- Game time: 1:00 p.m. CST/12:00 p.m. MST
- Game weather: 32 °F (0 °C)
- Game attendance: 59,818
- Referee: Bernie Kukar
- TV announcers (Fox): Sam Rosen, Bill Maas, Kevin McCabe
- Box Score

Game information

**First quarter**

- GB – Bill Schroeder 10-yard pass from Brett Favre (Ryan Longwell kick), 7:38. Packers 7–0.

**Second quarter**

- ARI – Chris Jacke 23-yard field goal, 13:48. Packers 7–3.
- GB – Dorsey Levens 8-yard run (Ryan Longwell kick), 5:59. Packers 14–3.

**Third quarter**

- GB – Dorsey Levens 1-yard run (Ryan Longwell kick), 5:57. Packers 21–3.
- ARI – Frank Sanders 6-yard pass from Jake Plummer (Chris Jacke kick), 1:49. Packers 21–10.
- GB – Basil Mitchell 88-yard kickoff return (Ryan Longwell kick), 1:32. Packers 28–10.

**Fourth quarter**

- GB – Dorsey Levens 5-yard run (Ryan Longwell kick), 12:09. Packers 35–10.
- ARI – Mario Bates 1-yard run (Chris Jacke kick), 9:29. Packers 35–17.
- GB – Bill Schroeder 32-yard pass from Brett Favre (Ryan Longwell kick), 2:38. Packers 42–17.
- ARI – Mac Cody 9-yard pass from Jake Plummer (Chris Jacke kick), 1:49. Packers 42–24.
- GB – Dorsey Levens 1-yard run (Ryan Longwell kick), 0:58. Packers 49–24.

**Top passers**

- ARI – Jake Plummer – 35/57, 396 yards, 2 TD, 3 INT
- GB – Brett Favre – 21/34, 311 yards, 2 TD, INT

**Top rushers**

- ARI – Mario Bates – 17 rushes, 64 yards, TD
- GB – Dorsey Levens – 24 rushes, 146 yards, 4 TD

**Top receivers**

- ARI – Frank Sanders – 13 receptions, 118 yards, TD
- GB – Bill Schroeder – 6 receptions, 93 yards, 2 TD

=== Standings ===
NFC East
	W	L	T	PCT	PF	PA	STK
^{(3)} Washington Redskins	10	6	0	.625	443	377	W2
^{(5)} Dallas Cowboys	8	8	0	.500	352	276	W1
New York Giants	7	9	0	.438	299	358	L3
Arizona Cardinals	6	10	0	.375	245	382	L4
Philadelphia Eagles	5	11	0	.313	272	357	W2
