= Terry Irving =

American football player (born 1971)

No. 56
- Position: Linebacker

Personal information
- Born: July 3, 1971 (age 55); Galveston, Texas, U.S.
- Listed height: 6 ft 2 in (1.88 m)
- Listed weight: 230 lb (104 kg)

Career information
- High school: Ball (Galveston)
- College: McNeese State
- NFL draft: 1994: 4th round, 115th overall pick

Career history
- Arizona Cardinals (1994–1998); Tennessee Titans (1999)*
- * Offseason or practice squad member only

Career NFL statistics
- Tackles: 138
- Sacks: 1
- Fumble recoveries: 6
- Stats at Pro Football Reference

Terry Duane Irving (born July 3, 1971) is an American former professional football player who was a linebacker for five seasons with the Arizona Cardinals of the National Football League (NFL). He played college football for the McNeese State Cowboys and was selected by the Cardinals in the fourth round of the 1994 NFL draft.

== NFL career statistics ==
Legend
**Bold**	Career high

Year	Team	Games		Tackles				Interceptions				Fumbles			
Year	Team	GP	GS	Comb	Solo	Ast	Sck	Int	Yds	TD	Lng	FF	FR	Yds	TD
1994	ARI	16	0	13	8	5	0.0	0	0	0	0	**1**	1	0	0
1995	ARI	16	8	**59**	**49**	10	**1.0**	0	0	0	0	**1**	**3**	-2	0
1996	ARI	16	0	18	12	6	0.0	0	0	0	0	0	1	**5**	0
1997	ARI	16	6	42	28	**14**	0.0	0	0	0	0	0	1	0	0
1998	ARI	6	1	6	5	1	0.0	0	0	0	0	0	0	0	0
Career		70	15	138	102	36	1.0	0	0	0	0	2	6	3	0
