= Joe Nedney =

American football player and coach (born 1973)

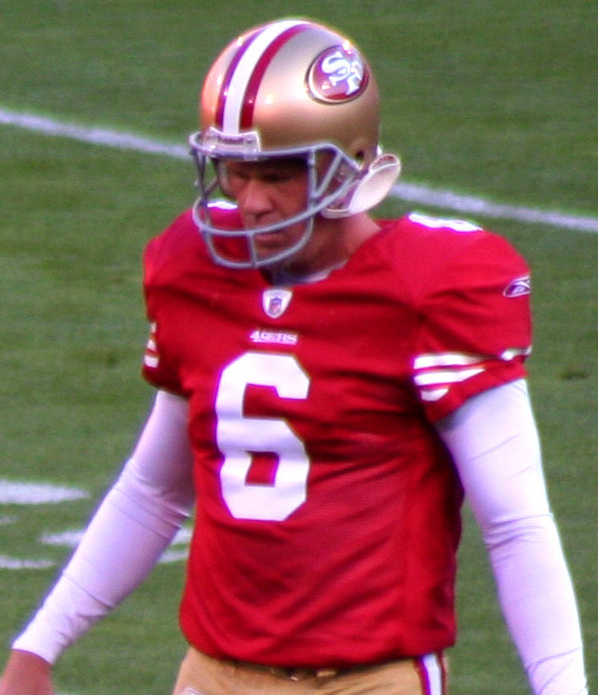
- Nedney with the San Francisco 49ers in 2009

No. 6
- Position: Placekicker

Personal information
- Born: March 22, 1973 (age 53); San Jose, California, U.S.
- Listed height: 6 ft 5 in (1.96 m)
- Listed weight: 220 lb (100 kg)

Career information
- High school: Santa Teresa (San Jose)
- College: San Jose State
- NFL draft: 1995: undrafted

Career history

Playing
- Green Bay Packers (1995)*; Oakland Raiders (1995)*; Miami Dolphins (1995–1996); New York Jets (1997)*; Miami Dolphins (1997)*; Arizona Cardinals (1997–1999); Baltimore Ravens (1999); Oakland Raiders (1999); Denver Broncos (2000); Carolina Panthers (2000); Tennessee Titans (2001–2004); San Francisco 49ers (2005–2010)
- * Offseason or practice squad member only

Coaching
- Scotts Valley High School (varsity ST) (2011–2014)

Career NFL statistics
- Field goals made: 256
- Field goals attempted: 319
- Field goal %: 80.3
- Long field goal: 56
- Stats at Pro Football Reference

Joseph Thomas Nedney (born March 22, 1973) is an American former professional football player who was a placekicker in the National Football League (NFL). He played college football at San Jose State and signed as an undrafted player with the Miami Dolphins in 1996. Nedney played for the San Francisco 49ers from 2005 to 2010 after having played for the Dolphins, Arizona Cardinals, Baltimore Ravens, Oakland Raiders, Denver Broncos, Carolina Panthers, and Tennessee Titans.

== Early life and education ==
Nedney was born and raised in San Jose, California and attended Santa Teresa High School. He lettered in football as a kicker/punter and basketball as a guard/forward.

== College career ==
Nedney played college football at San Jose State University, where he was a four-year letterman. He graduated as the school's all-time leading scorer with 236 points, going 39-for-70 in field goal attempts (including a school record 62-yarder) and 119-of-132 extra points. He also punted as a senior, averaging 37.8 yards per punt on 70 punts. In 1998, San Jose State awarded him a degree in recreation after Nedney completed an internship at the Arizona Cardinals community relations department.

== Professional career ==
Nedney started his NFL career in 1996, bouncing around practice squads for the Green Bay Packers, Oakland Raiders, and Miami Dolphins. He then joined the Dolphins full-time for the 1996 NFL season and led the team in scoring with 89 points. The following season, he signed with the Arizona Cardinals, who he stayed with for two and a half seasons, and at one point sharing kicking duties with veteran Chris Jacke. In 1999, he was waived by the Cardinals and then picked up by the Raiders, where he finished the season before being released. He was picked up by the Denver Broncos at the start of the 2000 NFL season to fill in for the injured Jason Elam, but was waived after three games and then signed by the Carolina Panthers. Nedney went on to join the Tennessee Titans the following year, and was their kicker for four years, until injuring his hamstring during the 2004 NFL season. During the 2002 playoffs, he was involved in a controversial running into the kicker penalty against the Steelers during overtime. Nedney had just missed a 31-yard field goal but was given another opportunity by the penalty. He made his second try, thus winning the game. After the game, Nedney said, "He got a pretty good hit on me, but when I'm done playing ball I might try acting."

He signed with the 49ers in March 2005. Nedney went 26 for 28 in 2005 and kicked a career-high 56-yard field goal against the St. Louis Rams on Christmas Eve. He was the Co-MVP for the 49ers, and quickly re-signed with the team during the offseason.

In the final game of the 1999 NFL season, while Nedney was with the Oakland Raiders, the Chiefs were denied a trip to the playoffs and an AFC West division title in the final game of the season when Nedney kicked a field goal in overtime, giving the division to the Seattle Seahawks instead. Coincidentally, Nedney, with the San Francisco 49ers in 2006, kicked a field goal in overtime against the Denver Broncos, knocking them from the playoff picture and giving the Chiefs the final wild-card spot in the playoffs.

On October 31, 2007, the NFL fined Nedney $7,500 for giving a fan the middle finger during the team's loss to the Saints on October 28.

On July 28, 2011, he was released by the 49ers and retired the next day.

== Career regular season statistics ==
Career high/best bolded

Regular season statistics
Season	Team (record)	G	FGM	FGA	%	<20	20-29	30-39	40-49	50+	LNG	BLK	XPM	XPA	%	PTS
1996	MIA (8–8)	16	18	29	62.1	1–1	7–7	7–11	3–8	0–2	44	0	35	**36**	97.2	89
1997	ARI (4–12)	10	11	17	64.7	1–1	3–3	4–4	3–7	0–2	45	0	19	19	**100.0**	52
1998	ARI (9–7)	12	13	19	68.4	0–0	6–6	1–1	5–8	1–4	53	**2**	30	30	**100.0**	69
1999	ARI (6–10)	1	0	0	0.0	0–0	0–0	0–0	0–0	0–0	0	0	0	0	0.0	0
1999	OAK (8–8)	3	5	7	71.4	0–0	2–2	2–2	0–1	1–2	52	0	13	13	**100.0**	28
2000	DEN (11–5)	3	8	10	80.0	0–0	6–6	1–1	1–2	0–1	43	0	4	4	**100.0**	28
2000	CAR (7–9)	12	26	28	**92.9**	1–1	**10–10**	6–7	7–8	**2–2**	52	0	20	20	**100.0**	98
2001	TEN (7–9)	16	20	28	71.4	0–0	6–6	5–5	8–15	1–2	51	0	34	35	97.1	94
2002	TEN (11–5)	16	25	31	80.6	0–0	9–9	10–12	5–8	1–2	53	0	**36**	**36**	**100.0**	111
2003	TEN (12–4)	1	1	1	100.0	0–0	0–0	0–0	0–0	1–1	50	0	0	1	0.0	3
2005	SF (4–12)	15	26	28	**92.9**	0–0	4–4	10–11	**10–10**	2–3	**56**	0	19	19	**100.0**	97
2006	SF (7–9)	16	**29**	**35**	82.9	**2–2**	11–12	8–10	7–9	1–2	51	1	29	29	**100.0**	116
2007	SF (5–11)	16	17	19	89.5	1–1	5–5	6–6	5–5	0–2	50	0	22	22	**100.0**	73
2008	SF (7–9)	16	**29**	33	87.9	0–0	9–9	**10–10**	8–11	2–3	53	0	34	34	**100.0**	**121**
2009	SF (8–8)	14	17	21	81.0	0–0	4–4	7–8	4–6	2–3	51	0	33	33	**100.0**	84
2010	SF (6–10)	9	11	13	84.6	0–0	6–6	2–2	1–2	2–3	51	0	17	17	**100.0**	50
Career (14 seasons)		176	256	319	80.3	6–6	88–89	79–90	67–100	16–34	56	3	345	348	99.1	1113

== Coaching career ==
From 2011 to 2014, Nedney was varsity special teams coach for Scotts Valley High School.
