= Frank Sanders (American football) =

American football player (born 1973)

No. 81
- Position: Wide receiver

Personal information
- Born: February 17, 1973 (age 53); Fort Lauderdale, Florida, U.S.
- Listed height: 6 ft 2 in (1.88 m)
- Listed weight: 215 lb (98 kg)

Career information
- High school: Dillard (Fort Lauderdale)
- College: Auburn
- NFL draft: 1995: 2nd round, 47th overall pick

Career history
- Arizona Cardinals (1995–2002); Baltimore Ravens (2003)

Awards and highlights
- First-team All-America (1994); First-team All-SEC (1994); SEC Football Legends (2013)

Career NFL statistics
- Receptions: 507
- Receiving yards: 6,749
- Receiving touchdowns: 24
- Stats at Pro Football Reference

Frank Vondel Sanders (born February 17, 1973), is an American former professional football player who was a wide receiver in the National Football League (NFL). He played college football for the Auburn Tigers, earning first-team All-American honors in 1994. He was selected in the second round (47th overall) of the 1995 NFL draft by the Arizona Cardinals.

Sanders played in nine NFL seasons. His best season, statistically, in his career came during the 1998 season when he led the National Football Conference (NFC) in receptions with 89 for 1,145 yards and three touchdowns.

== College career ==
Sanders attended Auburn University from 1991–1994. At Auburn, he was a four-year letterman and was named First-team All-America by the Associated Press, the Football Writers Association of America and Scripps, as well as a consensus All-Southeastern Conference selection after his senior season and leading the conference in receiving yards per game (91.0) and breaking the Tigers' single-season record for receptions (58). Sanders finished his Auburn career second in total receptions with 121, receiving yardage with 1,998, and receiving touchdowns with 15. He was selected in the 14th round (385th overall) of the 1994 Major League Baseball draft by the Seattle Mariners, though he never signed with the team.

In September 2013, he was named to the 2013 SEC Football Legends class.

=== Career statistics ===
| Season | | Receiving | | | | | Rushing | | | | |
| Year | Team | Rec | Yds | Avg | Lng. | TD | Att | Yds | Avg | Lng. | TD |
|---|---|---|---|---|---|---|---|---|---|---|---|
| 1991 | AUB | 2 | 42 | 21.0 | -- | 0 | 0 | 0 | 0 | 0 | 0 |
| 1992 | AUB | 13 | 204 | 15.7 | -- | 2 | 0 | 0 | 0 | 0 | 0 |
| 1993 | AUB | 48 | 842 | 17.5 | -- | 6 | 6 | 57 | 9.5 | -- | 1 |
| 1994 | AUB | 58 | 910 | 15.7 | -- | 7 | 6 | 84 | 14.0 | -- | 2 |
| Career | | 121 | 1,998 | 16.5 | -- | 15 | 12 | 141 | 11.8 | -- | 3 |

== Professional career ==
Sanders was selected in the second round (47th overall) of the 1995 NFL draft by the Arizona Cardinals. As a rookie, he started all 16 games, and recorded 52 receptions for 883 yards and two touchdowns. During Week 6, in a 27–21 loss to the New York Giants he recorded six receptions for 108 yards and the only two touchdowns of the season. In 1996, he recorded 69 receptions or 813 yards and four touchdowns. In 1997, he recorded 75 receptions for 1,017 yards and four touchdowns. In 1998, he experienced his best season statistically. He led the team in receptions (89) and receiving yards (1,145) and three touchdowns. In 1999, he recorded 79 receptions for 954 yards and one touchdown. In 2000, he recorded 54 receptions for 749 yards and a career-high in touchdowns (6). In 2001, he recorded 41 receptions for 618 yards and two touchdowns. In 2002, his final with the Cardinals, he recorded a Cardinals' career low in receptions (34) and receiving yards (400), and two touchdowns.

In April 2003, Sanders signed a four-year contract with the Baltimore Ravens. After suffering injuries throughout the 2003 season, he recorded a career low, 14 receptions for another career low, 170 yards. In April 2004, he was released by the Ravens.

== NFL career statistics ==
| Year | Team | Games | | Receiving | | | | | Rushing | | | | |
| Year | Team | GP | GS | Rec | Yds | Avg | Lng | TD | Att | Yds | Avg | Lng | TD |
|---|---|---|---|---|---|---|---|---|---|---|---|---|---|
| 1995 | ARI | 16 | 15 | 52 | 883 | 17.0 | 48 | 2 | 1 | 1 | 1.0 | 1 | 0 |
| 1996 | ARI | 16 | 16 | 69 | 813 | 11.8 | 34 | 4 | 2 | -4 | -2.0 | 1 | 0 |
| 1997 | ARI | 16 | 16 | 75 | 1,017 | 13.6 | 70 | 4 | 1 | 5 | 5.0 | 5 | 0 |
| 1998 | ARI | 16 | 16 | 89 | 1,145 | 12.9 | 42 | 3 | 4 | 0 | 0.0 | 7 | 0 |
| 1999 | ARI | 16 | 16 | 79 | 954 | 12.1 | 63 | 1 | 0 | 0 | 0.0 | 0 | 0 |
| 2000 | ARI | 16 | 16 | 54 | 749 | 13.9 | 53 | 6 | 0 | 0 | 0.0 | 0 | 0 |
| 2001 | ARI | 15 | 13 | 41 | 618 | 15.1 | 68 | 2 | 0 | 0 | 0.0 | 0 | 0 |
| 2002 | ARI | 12 | 12 | 34 | 400 | 11.8 | 37 | 2 | 3 | 2 | 0.7 | 5 | 0 |
| 2003 | BAL | 13 | 0 | 14 | 170 | 12.1 | 44 | 0 | 0 | 0 | 0.0 | 0 | 0 |
| Career | | 136 | 120 | 507 | 6,749 | 13.3 | 70 | 24 | 11 | 4 | 0.4 | 7 | 0 |

== Post-football ==
In September 2016, Sanders along with the Arizona Cardinals, gave out school supplies to the students at Herrera Elementary School.
