= Rob Moore (American football) =

American football player and coach (born 1968)

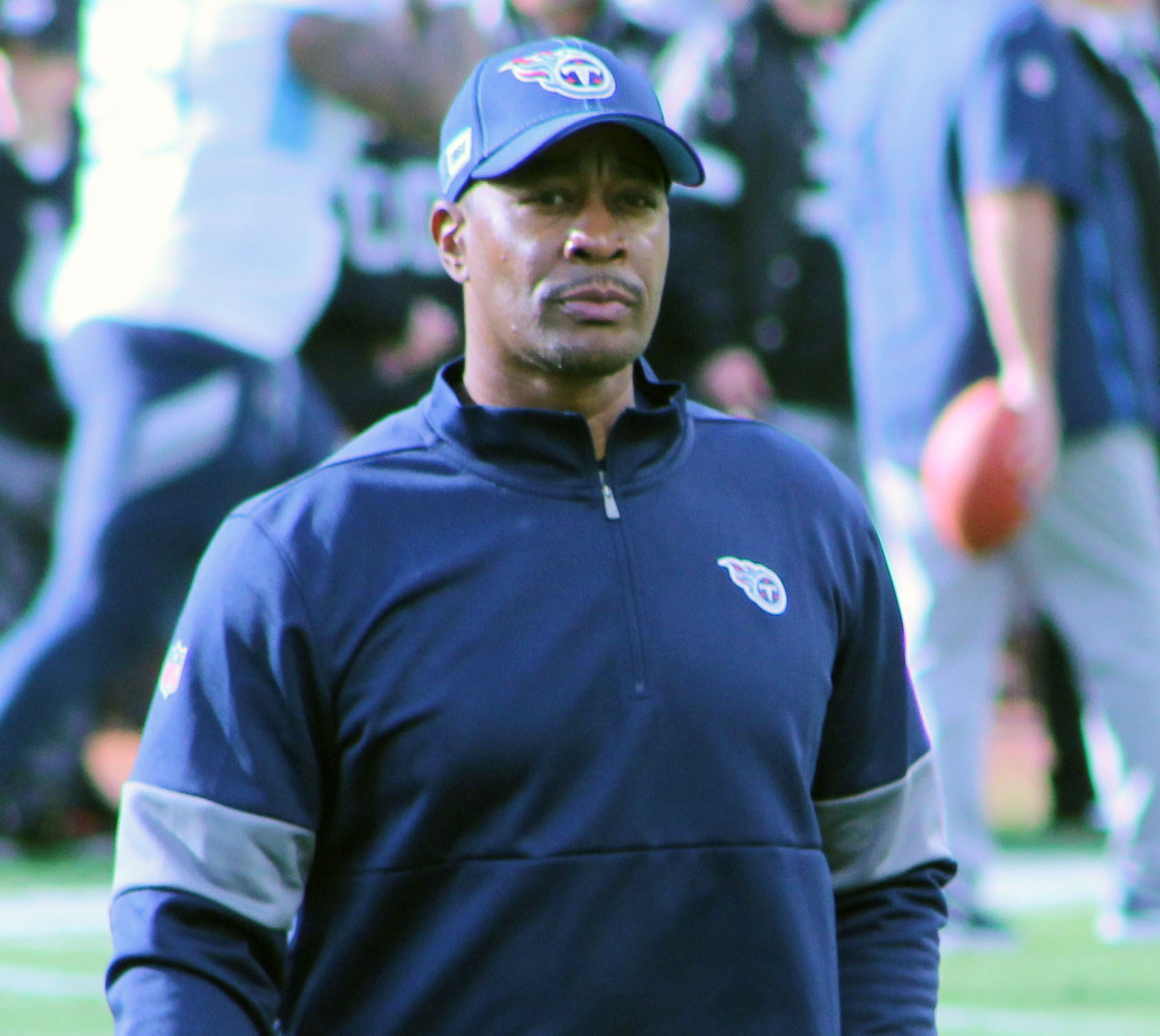
- Moore with the Tennessee Titans in 2019

Carolina Panthers
- Title: Wide receivers coach

Personal information
- Born: September 27, 1968 (age 58); Hempstead, New York, U.S.
- Listed height: 6 ft 3 in (1.91 m)
- Listed weight: 204 lb (93 kg)

Career information
- Position: Wide receiver (No. 85)
- High school: Hempstead
- College: Syracuse (1987–1989)
- Supplemental draft: 1990: 1st round

Career history

Playing
- New York Jets (1990–1994); Arizona Cardinals (1995–2001); Denver Broncos (2002)*
- * Offseason or practice squad member only

Coaching
- Montclair HS (NJ) (2002–2003) Wide receivers coach; Phoenix (2009) Wide receivers coach; Syracuse (2010–2012) Wide receivers coach; Buffalo Bills (2013–2014) Wide receivers coach; Oakland Raiders (2015–2017) Wide receivers coach; Tennessee Titans (2018–2023) Wide receivers coach; Carolina Panthers (2024–present) Wide receivers coach

Awards and highlights
- First-team All-Pro (1997); 2× Pro Bowl (1994, 1997); NFL receiving yards leader (1997); PFWA All-Rookie Team (1990); Second-team All-American (1989); First-team All-East (1989); Second-team All-East (1988); NFL records: Most pass targets in a season: 209

Career NFL statistics
- Receptions: 628
- Receiving yards: 9,368
- Receiving touchdowns: 49
- Stats at Pro Football Reference

Robert Sean Moore (born September 27, 1968) is an American professional football coach and former player who is the wide receivers coach for the Carolina Panthers of the National Football League (NFL). Moore played in the NFL as a wide receiver with the New York Jets from 1990 to 1994 and the Arizona Cardinals from 1995 to 2001. He played college football for the Syracuse Orange, earning All-American honors in 1989.

== Playing career ==
A 6'3", 202-lb. wide receiver from Syracuse University, Moore played 11 NFL seasons from 1990 to 2001. He was drafted by the New York Jets in the first round of the supplemental draft in 1990. In 153 games played (146 starts), Moore registered 628 receptions for 9,368 yards and 49 touchdowns. In the 1997 season Moore caught 97 receptions for 1,584 yards and eight touchdowns and en route to an All-Pro selection. He graduated from Hempstead High School in Hempstead, New York.

His younger brother is linebacker Brandon Moore also played in the NFL.

Footage of Moore appeared in the hit movie Jerry Maguire. The character Rod Tidwell, played by Cuba Gooding, Jr. wore Moore's No. 85 jersey number.

== Coaching career ==
In January 2010, Moore was hired by Doug Marrone as the wide receivers coach at his alma mater, Syracuse University. On February 6, 2014, Moore was added to the Buffalo Bills staff as the receivers coach. Moore was released along with the rest of the Bills coaching staff after Marrone unexpectedly left the Bills following the 2014 season.

On January 29, 2018, Moore was hired as the wide receivers coach for the Tennessee Titans.

== NFL career statistics ==
Legend
	NFL record
	Led the league
**Bold**	Career high

=== Regular season ===
Year	Team	Games		Receiving						
Year	Team	GP	GS	Tgt	Rec	Yds	Avg	Lng	TD	FD
1990	NYJ	15	13	82	44	692	15.7	69	6	29
1991	NYJ	16	16	134	70	987	14.1	53	5	47
1992	NYJ	16	15	118	50	726	14.5	48	4	32
1993	NYJ	13	13	101	64	843	13.2	51	1	47
1994	NYJ	16	16	159	78	1,010	12.9	41	6	53
1995	ARI	15	15	116	63	907	14.4	45	5	46
1996	ARI	16	16	147	58	1,016	**17.5**	69	4	45
1997	ARI	16	16	**209**	**97**	**1,584**	16.3	47	**8**	**68**
1998	ARI	16	16	146	67	982	14.7	57	5	43
1999	ARI	14	10	101	37	621	16.8	**71**	5	26
Career		153	146	1,313	628	9,368	14.9	71	49	436

=== Postseason ===
Year	Team	Games		Receiving						
Year	Team	GP	GS	Tgt	Rec	Yds	Avg	Lng	TD	FD
1991	NYJ	1	1	7	4	70	**17.5**	**31**	0	3
1998	ARI	2	2	**26**	**11**	**132**	12.0	23	0	**6**
Career		3	3	33	15	202	13.5	31	0	9
