= Adrian Murrell =

American football player (born 1970)

No. 29, 22
- Position: Running back

Personal information
- Born: October 16, 1970 (age 56); Fayetteville, North Carolina, U.S.
- Listed height: 5 ft 10 in (1.78 m)
- Listed weight: 210 lb (95 kg)

Career information
- High school: Leilehua (Wahiawa, Hawaii)
- College: West Virginia
- NFL draft: 1993: 5th round, 120th overall pick

Career history
- New York Jets (1993–1997); Arizona Cardinals (1998–1999); Washington Redskins (2000); Carolina Panthers (2001)*; Dallas Cowboys (2003)
- * Offseason or practice squad member only

Awards and highlights
- First-team All-East (1991)

Career NFL statistics
- Rushing yards: 5,199
- Rushing average: 3.8
- Rushing touchdowns: 23
- Stats at Pro Football Reference

Adrian Byran Murrell (born October 16, 1970) is an American former professional football player who was a running back in the National Football League (NFL). He was selected by the New York Jets in the fifth round of the 1993 NFL draft after playing college football for the West Virginia Mountaineers. Murrell played in the NFL for nine seasons from 1993 to 2000 and 2003.

== Early life ==
Murrell attended Leilehua High School in Wahiawa, Hawaii.

== College career ==
Murrell arrived at West Virginia University in 1990, when Michael Beasley started for the Mountaineers. The Mountaineers went 4-7 that season, with Murrell only seeing limited time. He only rushed for 48 yards on seven attempts that season.

In his sophomore year, 1991, Murrell and the Mountaineers began to increase their product. The Mountaineers went 6-5 that season, while Murrell saw the starting role. He rushed for 904 yards and seven touchdowns on the year, with an added 100 receiving yards.

In his final season as a Mountaineer, his junior year of 1992, Murrell produced the best season of his college career. While the Mountaineers sunk back, going 5–4–2, Murrell made national headlines. He rushed for 1,145 yards and six touchdowns, along with 244 receiving yards and three receiving touchdowns.

Murrell is a member of Alpha Phi Alpha fraternity.

== Professional career ==
Pre-draft measurables
Height	Weight	Arm length	Hand span	40-yard dash	10-yard split	20-yard split	20-yard shuttle	Vertical jump	Broad jump	Bench press
5 ft 10 1/4 in (1.78 m)	206 lb (93 kg)	31 1/2 in (0.80 m)	8 3/4 in (0.22 m)	4.59 s	1.62 s	2.68 s	4.17 s	33.5 in (0.85 m)	9 ft 9 in (2.97 m)	12 reps

=== New York Jets ===
Murrell left West Virginia after his junior season, and was selected in the fifth round of the 1993 NFL draft by the New York Jets. In his first two seasons as a Jet, Murrell rushed for a total of 317 yards and a touchdown.

In 1995, Murrell began to break out as a player. He rushed for 795 yards on the season, along with a touchdown. He also added 495 yards and two touchdowns receiving. The following year, 1996, Murrell posted his best performance of his professional career. He rushed for 1,249 yards (4th in AFC, 7th in NFL) and six touchdowns that season, along with a receiving touchdown.

In 1997, Murrell recorded 1,086 yards rushing with seven touchdowns and caught two receiving touchdowns.

=== Arizona Cardinals ===
Following the 1997 season, Murrell was traded to the Arizona Cardinals. Murrell gained 1,042 yards and eight touchdowns in 1998 playing in all 16 games. He went on to rush for 95 yards and catch 2 passes for 16 yards and a touchdown in the Cardinals 20-7 Wildcard playoff win over the Dallas Cowboys, a team that had beaten Arizona twice in the regular season. This was Arizona's first postseason win since 1947. In 1999, he only rushed for 553 yards, but caught 49 passes for 335 yards.

=== Washington Redskins ===
Following the Arizona stint, Murrell arrived in Washington with the Redskins for the 2000 season. But Murrell only saw limited action during the season, and recorded 50 rushing yards.

=== Carolina Panthers ===
Murrell was signed by the Carolina Panthers in the 2001 offseason to serve in a backup role, but was cut before the season began to make room for Richard Huntley on the active roster.

=== Dallas Cowboys ===
After a two-year break from the NFL, Murrell returned in 2003 to play for the Dallas Cowboys. In Murrell's final professional season, he recorded 107 yards rushing.

== NFL career statistics ==
Legend
	Led the league
**Bold**	Career high

=== Regular season ===
Year	Team	Games		Rushing					Receiving				
Year	Team	GP	GS	Att	Yds	Avg	Lng	TD	Rec	Yds	Avg	Lng	TD
1993	NYJ	16	0	34	157	4.6	37	1	5	12	2.4	8	0
1994	NYJ	10	1	33	160	**4.8**	19	0	7	76	**10.9**	20	0
1995	NYJ	15	9	192	795	4.1	30	1	**71**	**465**	6.5	**43**	**2**
1996	NYJ	16	16	**301**	**1,249**	4.1	**78**	6	17	81	4.8	30	1
1997	NYJ	16	15	300	1,086	3.6	43	7	27	106	3.9	23	0
1998	ARI	15	14	274	1,042	3.8	32	**8**	18	169	9.4	30	**2**
1999	ARI	16	12	193	553	2.9	22	0	49	335	6.8	23	0
2000	WAS	15	0	20	50	2.5	13	0	16	93	5.8	12	0
2003	DAL	3	0	28	107	3.8	17	0	4	32	8.0	14	0
		122	67	1,375	5,199	3.8	78	23	214	1,369	6.4	43	5

=== Playoffs ===
Year	Team	Games		Rushing					Receiving				
Year	Team	GP	GS	Att	Yds	Avg	Lng	TD	Rec	Yds	Avg	Lng	TD
1998	ARI	2	2	27	157	5.8	74	0	5	68	13.6	39	1
		2	2	27	157	5.8	74	0	5	68	13.6	39	1

== Personal life ==
His younger brother, Marques Murrell, was a defensive end on the Appalachian State University football team. He signed a contract with the New York Jets on November 7, 2007. His father, a career soldier, was a Command Sergeants Major at the time of his draft. Stationed at Ft. Bragg. Married to Tonia Peck Murrell. They have three children.
