= Jon Clark (American football) =

American football player (born 1973)

No. 72, 79
- Position: Offensive tackle

Personal information
- Born: April 11, 1973 (age 53); Philadelphia, Pennsylvania, U.S.
- Listed height: 6 ft 6 in (1.98 m)
- Listed weight: 345 lb (156 kg)

Career information
- High school: John Bartram (Philadelphia)
- College: Temple
- NFL draft: 1996: 6th round, 187th overall pick

Career history
- Chicago Bears (1996–1997); New York Jets (1997); Arizona Cardinals (1998–2000)

Career NFL statistics
- Games played: 10
- Stats at Pro Football Reference

Jon Clark (born April 11, 1973) is an American former professional football player who was an offensive tackle for four seasons in the National Football League (NFL) with the Chicago Bears and Arizona Cardinals. He played college football for the Temple Owls.

== Early life and college ==
Jon Clark was born on April 11, 1973, in Philadelphia, Pennsylvania. He went to high school at John Bartram (PA). He went to college at Temple University.

== Professional career ==
Pre-draft measurables
Height	Weight	Hand span	40-yard dash	10-yard split	20-yard split	20-yard shuttle	Broad jump	Bench press
6 ft 6 1/2 in (1.99 m)	354 lb (161 kg)	10.1 in (0.26 m)	5.61 s	1.99 s	3.30 s	5.15 s	7 ft 5 in (2.26 m)	13 reps
All values from NFL Scouting Combine

Clark was selected by the Chicago Bears in the sixth round (187th pick) of the 1996 NFL draft. In his rookie season he only played in one game. In his second season he played in one game because of injuries to the offensive line. Then he went to the Cardinals in 1998 and played in six games. He also was in two playoff games. In 1999, he played in two games. He was on the Cardinals in 2000 but did not appear in any games.
