= Rashod Swinger =

American football player (born 1974)

No. 91
- Position: Defensive tackle/Defensive end

Personal information
- Born: November 27, 1974 (age 51); Paterson, New Jersey, U.S.
- Listed height: 6 ft 2 in (1.88 m)
- Listed weight: 286 lb (130 kg)

Career information
- High school: Manalapan (Englishtown, New Jersey)
- College: Rutgers
- NFL draft: 1997: undrafted

Career history
- San Diego Chargers (1997)*; Arizona Cardinals (1997–2001)
- * Offseason or practice squad member only

Career NFL statistics
- Games played - started: 32 - 25
- Tackles: 88
- Sacks: 1
- Stats at Pro Football Reference

Rashod Alexander Swinger (born November 27, 1974) is an American former professional football player who was a defensive lineman for three seasons with the Arizona Cardinals of the National Football League (NFL). He attended Manalapan High School in Englishtown, New Jersey, and played college football for the Rutgers Scarlet Knights.
