= Jarius Hayes =

American football player (born 1973)

No. 89, 48, 88
- Position: Tight end

Personal information
- Born: March 27, 1973 (age 53); Muscle Shoals, Alabama, U.S.
- Listed height: 6 ft 3 in (1.91 m)
- Listed weight: 266 lb (121 kg)

Career information
- High school: Muscle Shoals
- College: North Alabama
- NFL draft: 1996: 7th round, 212th overall pick

Career history
- Arizona Cardinals (1996–1998); Amsterdam Admirals (1998)
- Stats at Pro Football Reference

Jarius Hayes (born March 27, 1973) is an American former professional football player who was a tight end for the Arizona Cardinals of the National Football League (NFL). He played college football for the North Alabama Lions and was selected by Cardinals in the 1996 NFL draft. He played for them in 1996 and 1998.
