= Johnny McWilliams =

American football player (born 1972)

No. 87
- Position: Tight end

Personal information
- Born: December 14, 1972 (age 53); Ontario, California, U.S.
- Listed height: 6 ft 4 in (1.93 m)
- Listed weight: 271 lb (123 kg)

Career information
- High school: Pomona (Pomona, California)
- College: USC
- NFL draft: 1996: 3rd round, 64th overall pick

Career history
- Arizona Cardinals (1996–1999); Minnesota Vikings (2000); New England Patriots (2001)*; Minnesota Vikings (2002)*
- * Offseason or practice squad member only

Awards and highlights
- Second-team All-Pac-10 (1995)

Career NFL statistics
- Receptions: 73
- Receiving yards: 690
- Touchdowns: 9
- Stats at Pro Football Reference

Johnny E. McWilliams (born December 14, 1972) is an American former professional football player who was a tight end in the National Football League (NFL). He played college football for the USC Trojans.

== Early life ==
McWilliams prepped at Pomona High School.

== College career ==
McWilliams played college football at the University of Southern California.

== Professional career ==
McWilliams was selected with the 64th pick of the third round of the 1996 NFL draft by the Arizona Cardinals where he played until 1999. In 2000, he played for the Minnesota Vikings.
