= National Register of Historic Places listings in Calcasieu Parish, Louisiana =

Location of Calcasieu Parish in Louisiana

This is a list of the National Register of Historic Places listings in Calcasieu Parish, Louisiana.

This is intended to be a complete list of the properties and districts on the National Register of Historic Places in Calcasieu Parish, Louisiana, United States. The locations of National Register properties and districts for which the latitude and longitude coordinates are included below, may be seen in a map.

There are 22 properties and districts listed on the National Register in the parish. Another property was once listed, but has been removed.

This National Park Service list is complete through NPS recent listings posted December 19, 2025.

== Current listings ==
	Name on the Register	Image	Date listed	Location	City or town	Description
1	1937 Iowa High School	1937 Iowa High School	June 23, 2011 (#11000397)	215 South Kinney Avenue, corner with East 2nd Street; 30°14′07″N 93°00′42″W	Iowa	Building now part of J. I. Watson Middle School campus.
2	All Saints Episcopal Church	All Saints Episcopal Church	September 20, 1983 (#83000493)	Corner of Hall Street and West Harrison Street; 30°26′56″N 93°26′13″W	DeQuincy	
3	Calcasieu Marine Bank	Calcasieu Marine Bank	March 11, 1991 (#91000221)	840 Ryan Street, corner with West Pujo Street; 30°13′41″N 93°13′04″W	Lake Charles	
4	Calcasieu Parish Courthouse	Calcasieu Parish Courthouse	November 2, 1989 (#89001938)	1000 Ryan Street; 30°13′35″N 93°13′06″W	Lake Charles	
5	Carver Courts LA-4	Carver Courts LA-4	June 18, 2018 (#100002577)	1300 N. Goos Boulevard; 30°15′18″N 93°11′39″W	Lake Charles	
6	Cash Grocery and Sales Company Warehouse	Cash Grocery and Sales Company Warehouse	June 24, 2010 (#10000395)	801 Enterprise Boulevard, corner with Broad Street; 30°13′38″N 93°12′14″W	Lake Charles	
7	Cathedral of the Immaculate Conception	Cathedral of the Immaculate Conception	October 7, 1994 (#94001201)	935 Bilbo Street; 30°13′36″N 93°13′00″W	Lake Charles	
8	Charleston Hotel	Charleston Hotel	May 27, 1982 (#82002762)	900 Ryan Street, corner with West Pujo Street; 30°13′40″N 93°13′04″W	Lake Charles	Mission Revival architecture and first skyscraper in Lake Charles
9	Clark Courts LA-4-3	Clark Courts LA-4-3	June 18, 2018 (#100002578)	1703 Pear Street; 30°15′36″N 93°11′33″W	Lake Charles	
10	DeQuincy Colored High School Gym	DeQuincy Colored High School Gym	August 2, 2017 (#100001430)	502 South Grand Avenue; 30°26′43″N 93°25′35″W	DeQuincy	
11	Deweyville-Starks Swing Bridge	Deweyville-Starks Swing Bridge	June 8, 2011 (#11000346)	TX 12 & LA 12 at Sabine River; 30°18′14″N 93°44′37″W	Starks vicinity	Part of Historic Bridges of Texas, 1866-1945 MPS.
12	Episcopal Church of the Good Shepherd	Episcopal Church of the Good Shepherd	December 22, 1983 (#83003607)	715 Kirkman Street; 30°13′50″N 93°12′34″W	Lake Charles	Also a contributing property to Lake Charles Historic District.
13	Jackson House	Jackson House	February 13, 1986 (#86000252)	South of Peach Street, about 400 yards (370 m) west of LA 27; 30°26′12″N 93°26′01″W	DeQuincy vicinity	
14	Kansas City Southern Depot	Kansas City Southern Depot	September 22, 1983 (#83000494)	400 Lake Charles Avenue; 30°27′06″N 93°26′07″W	DeQuincy	One of three remaining urban train depots in Louisiana.
15	Lake Charles Historic District	Lake Charles Historic District	March 16, 1990 (#90000434)	Roughly bounded by Belden Street, Lawrence Street, Kirkman Street, South Division Street, Louisiana Avenue, Iris Street, and Hodges Street; also 517 Broad St. and 517 Broad St. Rear; 30°13′42″N 93°12′35″W	Lake Charles	Second set of addresses represent a boundary increase approved December 5, 2019
16	Lyons House	Lyons House	April 27, 1982 (#82002763)	1335 Horridge Street; 30°11′21″N 93°34′52″W	Vinton	
17	McNeese State University Auditorium	McNeese State University Auditorium	May 5, 1989 (#89000381)	On east side of Ryan Street, about 200 yards (180 m) south of East Sale Road; 30°10′54″N 93°13′02″W	Lake Charles	
18	Muller's Department Store	Muller's Department Store	February 15, 2007 (#07000069)	619-625 Ryan Street; 30°13′51″N 93°12′59″W	Lake Charles	Boundary were increased on May 18, 2007 to include nearby Berdon-Campbell Store.
19	Noble Building	Noble Building	June 10, 2014 (#14000310)	324 Pujo Street; 30°13′39″N 93°13′00″W	Lake Charles	
20	Old Lake Charles City Hall	Old Lake Charles City Hall	October 30, 1989 (#89001872)	1001 Ryan Street; 30°13′34″N 93°13′02″W	Lake Charles	
21	Ryan Street Historic District		September 17, 2024 (#100010868)	601-800 Ryan St., 102-11O W. Broad St., 311-345 Broad St.. 800 Bilbo St. 30°13′49″N 93°13′01″W	Lake Charles	
22	Waters Pierce Oil Company Stable Building	Waters Pierce Oil Company Stable Building	September 29, 1980 (#80001708)	1019 Lakeshore Drive; 30°13′33″N 93°13′11″W	Lake Charles	Now hosting the Junior League of Lake Charles.

== Former listings ==
	Name on the Register	Image	Date listed	Date removed	Location	City or town	Description
1	Arcade Theater	Arcade Theater	July 7, 1978 (#78001420)	July 22, 2016	822 Ryan St. 30°13′42″N 93°13′04″W	Lake Charles	Demolished after a fire in 1985.

== See also ==
- List of National Historic Landmarks in Louisiana
- National Register of Historic Places listings in Louisiana
