= Louisiana Highway 109 =

State highway in Louisiana, United States

Louisiana Highway 109

Route information
- Maintained by Louisiana DOTD
- Length: 40.0 mi (64.4 km)
- Existed: 1955 renumbering–present

Major junctions
- South end: US 90 / LA 3112 in Toomey
- LA 12 in Starks; LA 389 in Fields
- North end: LA 27 in Juanita

Location
- Country: United States
- State: Louisiana
- Parishes: Calcasieu, Beauregard

Highway system
- Louisiana State Highway System; Interstate; US; State; Scenic
← LA 108	→ I-110

Louisiana Highway 109 (LA 109) is a state highway located in southwestern Louisiana that runs 40.0 miles (64.4 km) in a north–south direction from U.S. Highway 90 (US 90) and LA 3112 southwest of Vinton to LA 27 at Juanita, a point north of DeQuincy. A largely rural route, LA 109 parallels the Texas–Louisiana border and passes through the community of Starks in Calcasieu Parish where it intersects LA 12. The southern terminus of LA 109 is located just north of I-10 (Exit 4) between Orange, Texas and Vinton, Louisiana.

== Route description ==
From the south, LA 109 begins at an intersection with US 90 and LA 3112 in Toomey, southwest of Vinton. From this four-way intersection, US 90 heads east toward Vinton and south a short distance to I-10 (Exit 4), at which point the two highways proceed west in a concurrency across the state line into Orange, Texas. Meanwhile, LA 109 proceeds due north, immediately crossing the Union Pacific Railroad (UPRR) tracks, for 2.5 miles (4.0 km) and intersects LA 3063, which heads east to the Delta Downs Race Track and ultimately into Vinton. Continuing north for 4.2 miles (6.8 km), LA 109 crosses the Sabine River Diversion System and curves slightly to the northwest for about the same distance to reach the community of Starks. Here, LA 109 crosses the Kansas City Southern Railway (KCS) tracks and intersects LA 12 a short distance later. LA 12 heads into Texas on the west and DeQuincy on the northeast. LA 109 then proceeds due north for 5.8 miles (9.3 km) and crosses from Calcasieu Parish into Beauregard Parish.

After 2.0 miles (3.2 km), LA 109 curves to the northeast and travels another 8.9 miles (14.3 km) to a point known as Fields. Here, LA 109 intersects LA 389, which connects to US 190 in Merryville on the northwest and LA 12 in DeQuincy on the southeast. From this intersection, LA 109 and LA 389 turn to the east, engaging in a brief wrong-way concurrency (though directional banners are not used here) before LA 109 turns off again to the northeast. During its final 11.4 miles (18.3 km), LA 109 passes through a point known as Mystic and reaches its northern terminus at an intersection with LA 27 at Juanita. LA 27 heads through Singer to DeRidder on the north and through DeQuincy to Lake Charles on the south.

LA 109 is an undivided, two-lane highway for its entire length.

== History ==
In the original Louisiana Highway system in use between 1921 and 1955, the modern LA 109 made up parts of several routes, including State Route 121 from the southern terminus at Toomey to Starks; State Route 143 from Starks to Beauregard Parish Road 441 (PR 441); and State Route 287 from there to the northern terminus at Juanita.

LA 109 was created with the 1955 Louisiana Highway renumbering, and its route has remained unchanged to the present day.

== Major intersections ==
Parish	Location	mi	km	Destinations	Notes
Calcasieu	Toomey	0.0	0.0	US 90 / LA 3112 west to I-10 – Lake Charles, Beaumont	Southern terminus; eastern terminus of LA 3112
Calcasieu		2.5	4.0	LA 3063 (Delta Downs Drive) – Race Track	Northwestern terminus of LA 3063
Calcasieu	Starks	11.4	18.3	LA 12 – DeQuincy, Beaumont	
Beauregard	Fields	28.1	45.2	LA 389 north – Merryville	South end of LA 389 concurrency
Beauregard	Fields	28.6	46.0	LA 389 south – DeQuincy	North end of LA 389 concurrency
Beauregard	Juanita	40.0	64.4	LA 27 – Singer, DeRidder, DeQuincy, Lake Charles	Northern terminus
1.000 mi = 1.609 km; 1.000 km = 0.621 mi: Concurrency terminus
