= National Register of Historic Places listings in Newton County, Texas =

Location of Newton County in Texas

This is a list of the National Register of Historic Places listings in Newton County, Texas.

This is intended to be a complete list of properties listed on the National Register of Historic Places in Newton County, Texas. There are six properties listed on the National Register in the county. Two are Recorded Texas Historic Landmarks including one that is also a State Antiquities Landmark.

This National Park Service list is complete through NPS recent listings posted May 1, 2026.

== Current listings ==
The locations of National Register properties may be seen in a mapping service provided.

	Name on the Register	Image	Date listed	Location	City or town	Description
1	Autrey-Williams House	Autrey-Williams House	January 29, 2013 (#12001251)	717 North St. 30°51′10″N 93°45′13″W	Newton	Recorded Texas Historic Landmark
2	Burr's Ferry Bridge	Burr's Ferry Bridge	May 18, 1998 (#98000562)	TX 63 & LA 8 at Sabine River; 31°03′50″N 93°31′13″W	Burkeville	Extends into Vernon Parish, Louisiana
3	Deweyville Swing Bridge	Deweyville Swing Bridge	June 8, 2011 (#11000346)	TX 12 & LA 12 at Sabine River; 30°18′13″N 93°44′37″W	Deweyville	Historic Bridges of Texas, 1866-1945 MPS, extends into Calcasieu Parish, Louisiana
4	Newton County Courthouse	Newton County Courthouse	July 19, 1979 (#79002999)	Off U.S. Route 190; 30°50′52″N 93°45′37″W	Newton	State Antiquities Landmark, Recorded Texas Historic Landmark
5	Addie L. and A.T. Odom Homestead	Addie L. and A.T. Odom Homestead	April 10, 2012 (#12000197)	194 County Road 1040; 30°58′11″N 93°42′23″W	Burkeville	
6	West Log House		December 13, 1979 (#79003000)	Northeast of Salem; 30°33′12″N 93°45′08″W	Salem	

== See also ==
- National Register of Historic Places listings in Texas
- Recorded Texas Historic Landmarks in Newton County
