= Newton County Courthouse =

Newton County Courthouse may refer to:

- Newton County Courthouse (Arkansas), Jasper, Arkansas
- Newton County Courthouse (Georgia), Covington, Georgia
- Newton County Courthouse (Indiana), Kentland, Indiana
- Newton County Courthouse (Texas), Newton, Texas, listed on the National Register of Historic Places
