= Fred Broussard =

American football player (born 1933)

No. 56, 50
- Position: Center

Personal information
- Born: March 7, 1933; Louisiana, U.S.
- Died: April 3, 2015 (aged 82); Burkeville, Texas, U.S.
- Listed height: 6 ft 3 in (1.91 m)
- Listed weight: 235 lb (107 kg)

Career information
- High school: DeQuincy (DeQuincy, Louisiana)
- College: Texas A&M; Northwestern St. (LA)
- NFL draft: 1955: 4th round, 42nd overall pick

Career history
- New York Giants (1955); Pittsburgh Steelers (1955); Houston Oilers (1960)*; Denver Broncos (1960)
- * Offseason or practice squad member only

Career NFL/AFL statistics
- Games played: 8
- Games started: 6
- Stats at Pro Football Reference

Frederick Ethridge Broussard (April 29, 1933 – April 3, 2015) was an American football player who played for Pittsburgh Steelers, New York Giants of the National Football League (NFL) and Denver Broncos of the American Football League (AFL). He played college football at Texas A&M University and Northwestern State University.

Broussard died on April 3, 2015 in Burkeville, Texas, at the age of 82.
