= James Monroe Smith (academic administrator) =

American university president

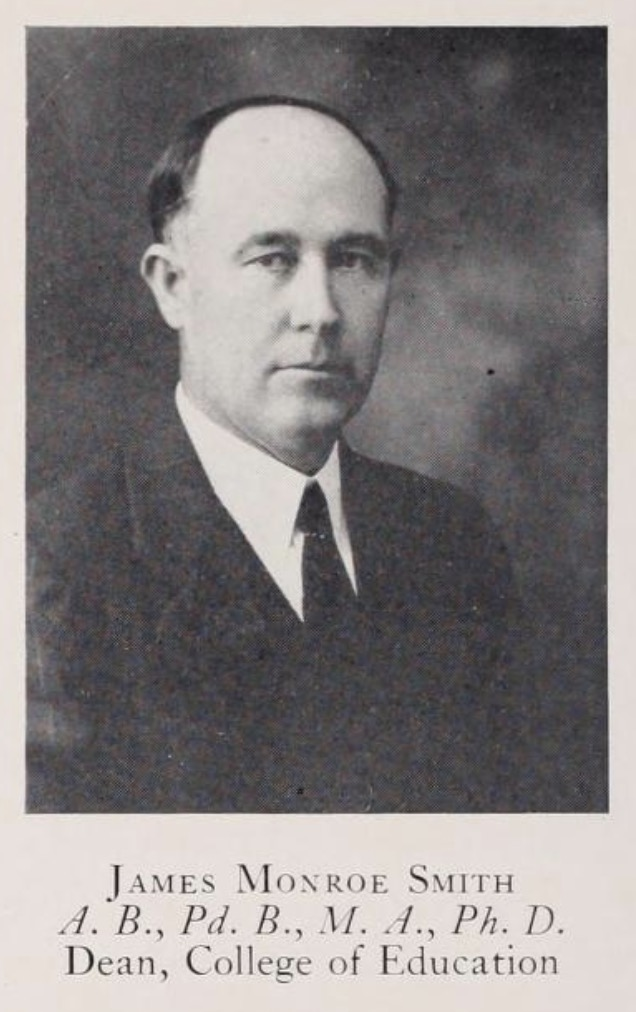

President of Louisiana State University
- In office 1930–1939
- Preceded by: Thomas W. Atkinson
- Succeeded by: Paul M. Hebert (interim)

Personal details
- Born: October 9, 1888 Jackson Parish, Louisiana, U.S.
- Died: May 26, 1949 (aged 60) Angola, Louisiana, U.S.
- Resting place: Roselawn Memorial Park, Baton Rouge, Louisiana
- Relations: James Monroe Smith, Jr. (son)
- Parent(s): John Henry Smith and Ava Addie Sims Smith

James Monroe Smith (October 9, 1888 – May 26, 1949) was an American educator and academic administrator in Louisiana, best known for an embezzlement scandal that sent him to prison.

== Early life ==
Smith grew up on a small farm in rural Jackson Parish, becoming a public school teacher and principal. He attended Valparaiso University in Indiana, earning a bachelor of pedagogy in 1913. He later became principal of DeQuincy High School in DeQuincy, Louisiana.

He had stints teaching at LSU and Northwestern State University before, in 1922, becoming dean of the College of Education at Southwestern Louisiana Institute, which is today the University of Louisiana at Lafayette. He earned a PhD in educational administration from Columbia University in 1927.

== President of LSU ==
In 1931, Louisiana governor Huey Long appointed him the seventh president of Louisiana State University. His administration was marked by Long's deep involvement in the university, which led to both massive investment and regular interference. In 1934, Long (then a senator) ordered Smith to expel seven students involved in an anti-Long piece that ran in the student newspaper, The Daily Reveille. LSU students nicknamed Smith "Jimmy the Stooge". LSU's student enrollment roughly quadrupled during his term in office.

== Criminal conviction ==
After Long's assassination in 1935, a wave of corruption investigations swept the state, collectively known as the Louisiana scandals. More than 20 officials were indicted, the most prominent being Gov. Richard W. Leche and Smith. In 1939, Smith was accused of embezzling hundreds of thousands of dollars from the university by forging bonds, the profits from which he lost in an attempt to corner the wheat market. On June 25, he resigned the presidency and fled the state, becoming an international fugitive until captured in Brockville, Ontario on July 1. Leche resigned as governor the day after Smith's resignation, June 26.

Smith was convicted of crimes in both state and federal courts. The state convictions earned him a sentence of 8 to 24 years in prison, which was commuted by Gov. Jimmie Davis after six years. The federal conviction, for mail fraud in relation to the sale of the Bienville Hotel in New Orleans to LSU, led to a 30-month sentence; he was paroled after 10 months.

== After prison ==
Smith was released from the Atlanta Federal Penitentiary on February 6, 1946. He worked briefly as principal of the Burritt Preparatory School for Boys at Spencer, Tennessee before returning to Louisiana. In 1948, Gov. Earl Long, Huey's brother, named Smith head of rehabilitation programs at Angola State Penitentiary. He died of a heart attack at Angola on May 26, 1949. His son, James Monroe Smith, Jr., also became an academic, serving as director of the Institute of Liberal Arts at Emory University.

Academic offices
Preceded by Thomas W. Atkinson	President of Louisiana State University; 1930–1939	Succeeded by Paul M. Hebert
