= Louisiana Highway 12 =

Highway in Louisiana

Louisiana Highway 12

- Route of LA 12 highlighted in red

Route information
- Maintained by Louisiana DOTD
- Length: 34.639 mi (55.746 km)
- Existed: 1955 renumbering–present

Major junctions
- West end: SH 12 at Deweyville, TX
- LA 27 in DeQuincy, LA
- East end: US 171 / US 190 in Ragley, LA

Location
- Country: United States
- State: Louisiana
- Parishes: Calcasieu, Beauregard

Highway system
- Louisiana State Highway System; Interstate; US; State; Scenic
← I-12	→ LA 13

Louisiana Highway 12 (LA 12) is a state highway located in southwestern Louisiana. It runs 34.64 miles (55.75 km) in an east–west direction from the Texas state line west of Starks to a junction with U.S. Highway 171 (US 171) and U.S. Highway 190 (US 190) in Ragley.

LA 12 traverses an area of the state known as Acadiana and is also signed as the Acadiana Trail. The route connects the city of DeQuincy with US 171 and US 190, two of the region's main highways. It is also the only highway crossing the Texas–Louisiana border between US 190 to the north and the concurrent Interstate 10 (I-10) and US 90 to the south. LA 12 enters both Calcasieu Parish and Beauregard Parish twice along its route. This is due to a northern protrusion of the former from an otherwise linear border that encompasses the DeQuincy area.

LA 12 was created in the 1955 Louisiana Highway renumbering from the westernmost portion of former State Route 7, which was otherwise concurrent with US 190 through most of the state.

== Route description ==
From the west, LA 12 begins at the Texas state line, midway across a swing bridge over the Sabine River. It continues the route of Texas State Highway 12 (SH 12) from the Newton County community of Deweyville into Calcasieu Parish, Louisiana. LA 12 heads east as an undivided two-lane highway through a largely uninhabited and heavily wooded area in the northwestern portion of the parish. After about 4 miles (6.4 km), scattered residences appear as the highway approaches the small community of Starks. Passing through the center of town, LA 12 intersects LA 109, which connects with Vinton to the south and Merryville to the north. East of Starks, LA 12 curves northeast and runs parallel to the Kansas City Southern Railway (KCS) tracks for the next 13 miles (21 km).

During this time, the highway briefly passes through a corner of Beauregard Parish before crossing back into Calcasieu Parish. Shortly afterward, LA 12 passes the DeQuincy Industrial Airpark, simultaneously entering the small city of DeQuincy. It then curves slightly more to the northeast and away from the railroad line. After passing the local middle and high schools, the route curves due east into town on West 4th Street. LA 12 intersects LA 389 (Cole Street) at the latter's southern terminus then makes a jog across the railroad tracks onto East 4th Street, entering the city's historic district. Signs direct visitors to the DeQuincy Railroad Museum, located one block to the north at the convergence of two branches of the KCS Railway. Shortly after a second grade crossing, LA 12 intersects LA 27, which heads northward along Page Street toward DeRidder. Widening to accommodate a center turning lane, the two highways run east concurrently for two blocks until LA 27 turns south onto South Grand Avenue, heading toward Sulphur.

Crossing out of the city limits, LA 12 narrows again to two lanes. It then curves to the northeast to follow the Union Pacific Railroad (UP) tracks for 11.5 miles (18.5 km) to an area known as Ragley. Along the way, LA 12 crosses into Beauregard Parish once again. The eastern terminus is located at an interchange with US 171 and US 190, specifically at the foot of ramps leading to and from southbound US 171, heading toward Lake Charles. LA 12 briefly widens to a divided four-lane highway to pass through the interchange. Eastbound US 190 continues straight ahead toward Kinder, first connecting to ramps leading to northbound US 171 and westbound US 190, which travel concurrently to DeRidder.

=== Route classification and data ===
LA 12 is classified by the Louisiana Department of Transportation and Development (La DOTD) as a rural minor arterial. Daily traffic volume in 2013 averaged between 2,500 and 4,300 vehicles for most of the route. The highest figure reported was 7,500 vehicles through DeQuincy, and the lowest figure was 2,400 between Starks and DeQuincy.

The posted speed limit is generally 55 mph (90 km/h) in rural areas, reduced to 35 mph (55 km/h) through DeQuincy.

== History ==
=== Pre-1955 route numbering ===
In the original Louisiana Highway system in use between 1921 and 1955, the modern LA 12 made up the westernmost part of State Route 7. Route 7 was designated in 1921 by an act of the state legislature as one of the original 98 state highway routes. This cross-state route continued eastward from Ragley along the modern corridor of US 190 through Opelousas, Baton Rouge, and Hammond to Covington. It then continued along the modern route of LA 21 through Bogalusa to the Mississippi state line. The entire portion of Route 7 west of Baton Rouge followed an established auto trail known as the Evangeline Highway, connecting Baton Rouge with Beaumont, Texas.

The routing of what is now LA 12 remained unchanged prior to the 1955 Louisiana Highway renumbering other than a short realignment through Starks. The original route here retains the local name Evangeline Highway. Perhaps the most significant improvement to the pre-1955 route occurred in 1938 upon completion of the Deweyville Swing Bridge over the Sabine River, replacing an existing ferry service at the Texas–Louisiana state line.

=== Post-1955 route history ===
LA 12 was created in the 1955 renumbering, following the western portion of former State Route 7 not covered by US 190.

La 12—From the Texas state line at or near Deweyville, Texas through or near Starks and DeQuincy to a junction with La-US 171 at or near Ragley.

— 1955 legislative route description

The route of LA 12 has remained the same since 1955. However, the eastern terminus at US 171 and US 190 has seen a major upgrade. The twin-span overpass at Ragley was replaced in 2001 (southbound) and 2005 (northbound), and the original folded diamond interchange was replaced with that of a modern design.

== Major intersections ==
Parish	Location	mi	km	Destinations	Notes
Sabine River		0.000– 0.059	0.000– 0.095	SH 12 west – Beaumont	Western terminus; continuation in Texas
Sabine River		0.000– 0.059	0.000– 0.095	Deweyville Swing Bridge	
Calcasieu	Starks	5.035	8.103	LA 109 – Vinton, Merryville	
Beauregard	No major junctions				
Calcasieu	DeQuincy	21.461	34.538	LA 389 north (Cole Street) – Fields	Southern terminus of LA 389
Calcasieu	DeQuincy	21.965	35.349	LA 27 north (Page Street) – DeRidder	Western end of LA 27 concurrency
Calcasieu	DeQuincy	22.154	35.653	LA 27 south (South Grand Avenue) – Sulphur	Eastern end of LA 27 concurrency
Beauregard	Ragley	34.456– 34.639	55.452– 55.746	US 171 / US 190 west – Lake Charles, DeRidder US 190 east – Kinder	Eastern terminus; interchange
1.000 mi = 1.609 km; 1.000 km = 0.621 mi: Concurrency terminus
