= Deweyville Swing Bridge =

- U.S. National Register of Historic Places
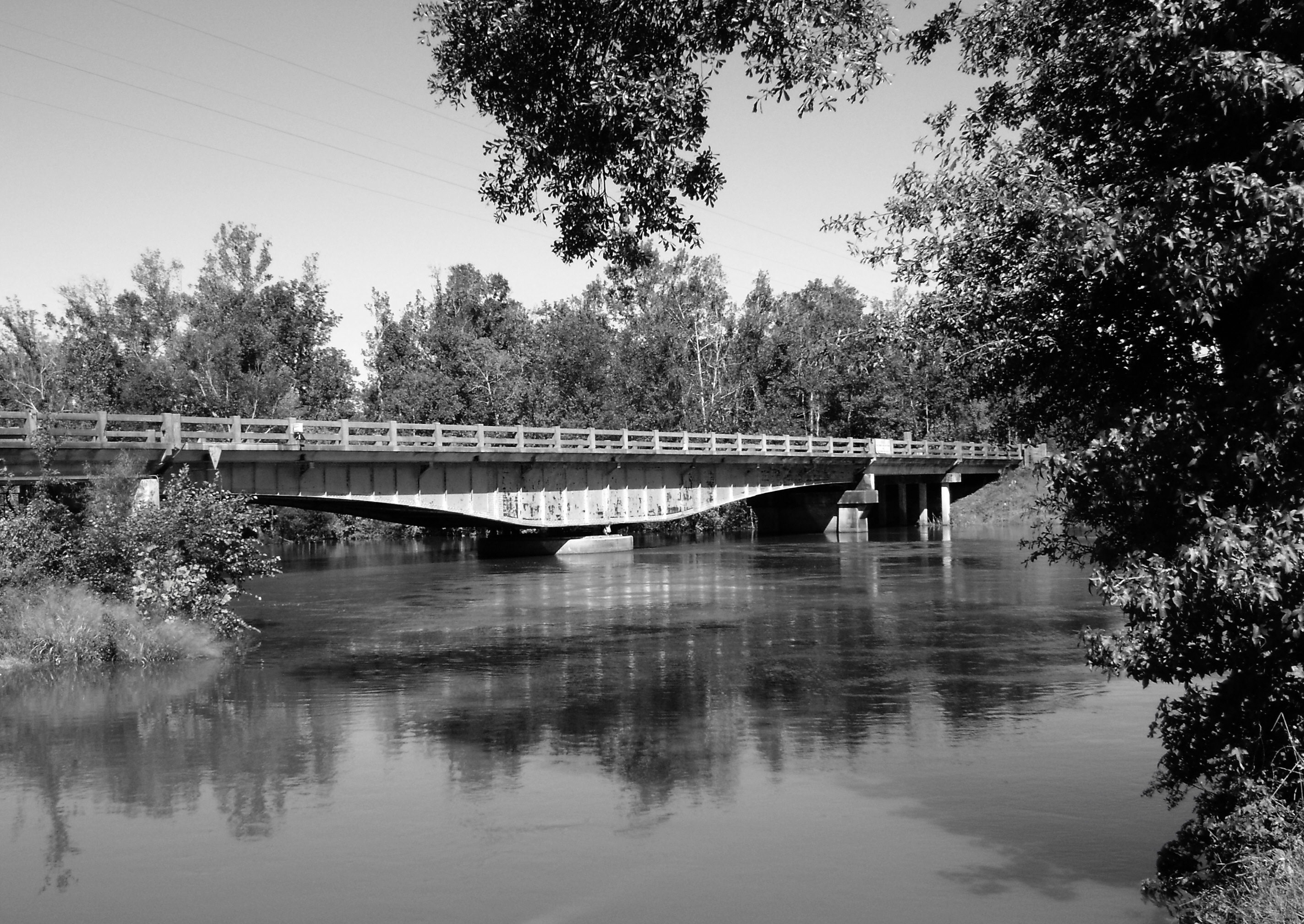
- Deweyville Swing Bridge in 2009

- Location within Louisiana Location within Texas Location within the United States
- Location: SH 12 / LA 12 at Sabine River, Deweyville, Texas
- Coordinates: 30°18′14″N 93°44′37″W
- Area: less than one acre
- Built: 1936-1938
- Built by: Forcum-James Co.
- Architectural style: Girder swing bridge
- MPS: Historic Bridges of Texas, 1866-1945 MPS
- NRHP reference No.: 11000346
- Added to NRHP: June 8, 2011

The Deweyville Swing Bridge, also known as Deweyville-Starks Swing Bridge and Sabine River Bridge, is a swing bridge which carries Texas State Highway 12 and Louisiana Highway 12 across the Sabine River at the Texas-Louisiana border. The bridge connects Deweyville, Texas to rural Calcasieu Parish, Louisiana, near the community of Starks. The Texas Highway Department and Louisiana Highway Commission built the bridge as a joint effort in 1936–38; the two highway departments used federal funding from Depression-era relief programs to complete the project. The bridge was one of four federally funded bridges between Texas and Louisiana built during the Great Depression. The swing bridge design, in which the center section of the bridge can rotate, allowed a variety of boats to pass by on the swift river. The bridge is the oldest surviving swing bridge of its design in Texas and one of three such bridges in the state.

The bridge was added to the National Register of Historic Places on June 8, 2011.

== See also ==
- National Register of Historic Places listings in Calcasieu Parish, Louisiana
- National Register of Historic Places listings in Newton County, Texas
