= Andre' Sam =

American football player (born 1999)

No. 32 – Philadelphia Eagles
- Position: Safety
- Roster status: Injured reserve

Personal information
- Born: February 9, 1999 (age 27)
- Listed height: 5 ft 10 in (1.78 m)
- Listed weight: 194 lb (88 kg)

Career information
- High school: Iowa (Iowa, Louisiana)
- College: McNeese (2017–2021); Marshall (2022); LSU (2023)
- NFL draft: 2024: undrafted

Career history
- Philadelphia Eagles (2024–present)

Awards and highlights
- Super Bowl champion (LIX)
- Stats at Pro Football Reference

Andre' Sam (born February 9, 1999) is an American professional football safety for the Philadelphia Eagles of the National Football League (NFL). He played college football for the McNeese Cowboys, Marshall Thundering Herd and LSU Tigers.

== Early life ==
Sam was born on February 9, 1999, and grew up in Iowa, Louisiana. He has a speech disorder that causes him to stutter. He was raised by his mother after his father and grandfather died when he was age six. Growing up, he trained in football with his older brother, Aaron, who went on to play college football for the McNeese Cowboys. Sam attended Iowa High School where he played football, being an all-state wide receiver and kick returner, and participated in track and field, being a district long jump champion and district champion in two relay events.

However, at the start of his senior year, his brother Aaron was killed in a shooting, and Sam considered quitting the sport. Sam opted to continue to play and had 775 receiving yards and 11 receiving touchdowns that year, helping Iowa reach the state playoff quarterfinals. Due to his weight, 150 pounds (68 kg), and his status as a small school prospect, Sam received no offers to play college football and walked-on to the local McNeese Cowboys.

== College career ==
Sam became a safety and redshirted as a true freshman at McNeese in 2017. He wore the number 21, previously worn by his brother, during the 2018 season, but only appeared in three games, posting six tackles, before suffering a torn labrum. He saw more playing time in 2019, playing 12 games and recording 51 tackles, seven pass breakups and an interception. The 2020 season was postponed to spring 2021 due to the COVID-19 pandemic, and he then appeared in all seven games during the spring 2021 season while leading the team with 52 tackles and three interceptions. He was a first-team All-Southland Conference (SLC) selection for the spring 2021 season. In the fall 2021 season, he placed second in the team with 70 tackles and made a team-leading seven pass breakups along with one interception, repeating as a first-team All-SLC pick.

Sam graduated from McNeese following the 2021 season but opted to continue his college football career, having received extra eligibility due to the COVID-19 pandemic and a medical redshirt from his injured 2018 season. He entered the NCAA transfer portal and concluded his stint at McNeese having appeared in 33 games while posting 179 tackles, 19 passes defended and five interceptions. Television station KSWL-LD noted that in his tenure with the team, Sam "had to play through three head coaches and deal with a pair of hurricanes that wiped out almost all of the Cowboy facilities." He ended up transferring to the Marshall Thundering Herd for the 2022 season.

With Marshall in the 2022 season, Sam totaled 53 tackles, 5.5 tackles-for-loss (TFLs) and seven pass breakups, being named honorable mention All-Sun Belt Conference (SBC). He opted to transfer again, and committed to the LSU Tigers for the 2023 season – his seventh and final year of college football. He was granted a medical waiver by the NCAA to be able to play in 2023. With the Tigers, he finished with 85 tackles and a team-leading three interceptions, earning the team's Defensive Player of the Year award. Across his time with McNeese, Marshall and LSU, Sam played in 68 games, 61 as a starter, making 317 tackles 11 TFLs and nine interceptions. He was invited to the 2024 NFL Scouting Combine.

== Professional career ==
Pre-draft measurables
Height	Weight	Arm length	Hand span	Wingspan	40-yard dash	10-yard split	20-yard split	20-yard shuttle	Three-cone drill	Vertical jump	Broad jump	Bench press
5 ft 10 7/8 in (1.80 m)	191 lb (87 kg)	30 in (0.76 m)	9 1/4 in (0.23 m)	6 ft 1 3/8 in (1.86 m)	4.53 s	1.67 s	2.60 s	4.32 s	7.03 s	36.0 in (0.91 m)	10 ft 3 in (3.12 m)	14 reps
All values from NFL Combine/Pro Day

After going unselected in the 2024 NFL draft, Sam signed with the Philadelphia Eagles as an undrafted free agent. He was the first alumnus of Iowa High School to sign into the NFL and the school retired his number 16 later in the year. He was waived on August 26, 2024, then re-signed to the practice squad on August 28. He was elevated to the active roster for the team's Week 14 game against the Carolina Panthers and made his NFL debut in the game. Sam won a Super Bowl championship when the Eagles defeated the Kansas City Chiefs 40–22 in Super Bowl LIX. He signed a reserve/future contract on February 14, 2025.

On August 26, 2025, Sam was waived by the Eagles as part of final roster cuts and re-signed to the practice squad the next day. He signed a reserve/futures contract on January 14, 2026.

On August 30, 2026, Sam was waived/injured by the Eagles and placed on injured reserve.
