= Jubilee Dunbar =

American football player (born 1947)

No. 86, 83
- Position: Wide receiver

Personal information
- Born: May 17, 1947 (age 79); New Orleans, Louisiana, U.S.
- Listed height: 6 ft 0 in (1.83 m)
- Listed weight: 196 lb (89 kg)

Career information
- High school: Washington (Lake Charles, Louisiana)
- College: Southern
- NFL draft: 1972: 3rd round, 71st overall pick

Career history
- San Francisco 49ers (1972)*; New Orleans Saints (1973); Cleveland Browns (1974); Philadelphia Bell (1975)
- * Offseason or practice squad member only

Career NFL statistics
- Receptions: 29
- Receiving yards: 521
- Receiving TDs: 4
- Stats at Pro Football Reference

Allen "Jubilee" Dunbar (born May 17, 1947) is an American former professional football player who was a wide receiver for two seasons in the National Football League (NFL) with the New Orleans Saints and Cleveland Browns. He was selected by the San Francisco 49ers in the third round of the 1972 NFL draft after playing college football at Southern University. Dunbar also played for the Philadelphia Bell of the World Football League.

== Early life and college ==
Allen Dunbar was born on May 17, 1947, in New Orleans, Louisiana. He attended Washington High School in Lake Charles, Louisiana.

Dunbar played college football for the Southern Jaguars of Southern University.

== Professional career ==
Dunbar was selected by the San Francisco 49ers in the third round, with the 71st overall pick, of the 1972 NFL draft. He spent the 1972 season on the 49ers' taxi squad. He re-signed with the team in 1973.

On September 3, 1973, Dunbar was traded to the New Orleans Saints for an undisclosed draft pick. He started all 14 games for the Saints in 1973, catching 23 passes for 447 yards and four touchdowns. The Saints finished the season with a 5–9 record.

On August 26, 1974, Dunbar was traded to the Cleveland Browns for Fair Hooker. Dunbar appeared in five games, starting three, for the Browns during the 1974 season and caught six passes for 74 yards before being placed on injured reserve on October 18, 1974. He was waived by the Browns in February 1975.

Dunbar was claimed off waivers by the San Diego Chargers on February 13, 1975. He was later released by the Chargers.

Dunbar signed with the Philadelphia Bell of the World Football League on October 2, 1975. He played in three games for the Bell during the 1975 season, returning two kickoffs for 43 and two punts for 18 yards.
