= Calcasieu Parish Public Schools =

School district based in Lake Charles, Louisiana

Calcasieu Parish School Board

Address
- 3310 Broad Street Calcasieu Parish Lake Charles, Louisiana, 70615; United States

District information
- Type: Public School District
- Motto: Building Foundations for the Future
- Grades: PK–12
- Established: July 16, 1877
- Superintendent: Jason VanMetre
- Accreditations: Advanced Ed and Southern Association of Colleges and Schools
- Budget: $355+ million (2013)
- NCES District ID: 2200330

Students and staff
- Students: 29,282 (2023–24)
- Teachers: 2,278.59 (on an FTE basis)
- Staff: 4,019.27 (on an FTE basis)
- Student–teacher ratio: 12.85

Other information
- Website: www.cpsb.org

The Calcasieu Parish School Board (CPSB) is a school district based in Lake Charles, Louisiana, United States. The CPSB operates all public schools in Calcasieu Parish, including the city of Lake Charles. The school district has a total of 58 schools (33 preschools, 38 elementary, 15 middle, 11 high).

== Demographics ==
- Total students (as of the 2017–18 and 2018-19 years): 27,932
- Race/ethnicity
  - White: 57.1%
  - African American: 31.0%
  - American Indian or Alaskan Native: 0.3%
  - Hispanic/Latino: 6.7%
  - Asian or Asian Pacific Islander: 1.7%
  - Two or more races: 3.1%
  - Native Hawaiian or Other Pacific Islander: 0.1%
- Gender
  - Female: 49%
  - Male: 51%

== School uniform ==
All CPSB students must wear school uniforms.

== Schools ==
=== K–12 schools ===
- Bell City High School (Unincorporated area)
- Starks High School (Unincorporated area)

=== High schools ===
Zoned

- A. M. Barbe High School (Lake Charles)
- DeQuincy High School (DeQuincy)
- Sam Houston High School (Moss Bluff, Unincorporated area)
- LaGrange High School (Lake Charles)
- Sulphur High School (Sulphur)
  - Sulphur High 9th Grade Campus (Opened 2004)
- Vinton High School (Vinton)
- Westlake High School (Westlake)
- Washington-Marion Magnet High School (Lake Charles)

Alternative

- Calcasieu Alternative Site East (Lake Charles)
- Calcasieu Alternative Site West (Sulphur)
- College Street Vocational Center/Westlake T&I (Lake Charles)

=== 6–12 schools ===
- Iowa High/Middle School (Iowa)

=== 6–8 Middle schools ===
- S. P. Arnett Middle School (Westlake)
- DeQuincy Middle School (DeQuincy)
- LeBlanc Middle School (Sulphur)
  - Housed inside is the Jake Drost Special School which serves special needs children in areas of the parish west of the Calcasieu River.
- W. W. Lewis Middle School (Sulphur)
- Maplewood Middle School (Sulphur)
- Ray D. Molo Middle School (Lake Charles)
- Moss Bluff Middle School (Unincorporated area)
- Oak Park Middle School (Lake Charles)
- Vinton Middle School (Vinton)
- S. J. Welsh Middle School (Lake Charles)
- Forrest K. White Middle School (Lake Charles)

=== Elementary schools ===
Zoned

- Barbe Elementary School (Lake Charles)
- Brentwood Elementary School (Lake Charles)
- College Oaks Elementary School (Lake Charles)
- Combre-Fondel Elementary School (Lake Charles)
- Cypress Cove Elementary School (Sulphur)
- DeQuincy Elementary School (DeQuincy)
- DeQuincy Primary School (DeQuincy)
- Dolby Elementary School (Lake Charles)
- Fairview Elementary School (Unincorporated area)
- Frasch Elementary School (Sulphur)
- Gillis Elementary School (Unincorporated area)
- W. T. Henning Elementary School (Sulphur)
- Henry Heights Elementary School (Lake Charles)
- J. J. Johnson, II Elementary School (Lake Charles)
- M. J. Kaufman Elementary School (Lake Charles)
- E. K. Key Elementary School (Sulphur)
- LeBleu Settlement Elementary School (Unincorporated area)
- Maplewood Elementary School (Sulphur)
- Moss Bluff Elementary School (Unincorporated area)
- A. A. Nelson Elementary School (Lake Charles)
- Oak Park Elementary School (Lake Charles)
- Prien Lake Elementary School (Lake Charles)
- St. John Elementary School (Lake Charles)
- Vincent Settlement Elementary School (Unincorporated area)
- R. W. Vincent Elementary School (Sulphur)
- Vinton Elementary School (Vinton)
- T. H. Watkins Elementary School (Lake Charles)
- J.I. Watson Elementary School (Iowa)
- Pearl Watson Elementary School (Lake Charles)
- Western Heights Elementary School (Westlake)
- Westwood Elementary School (Westlake)
- Ralph Wilson Elementary School (Lake Charles)

Application-based

- T. S. Cooley Elementary School (Lake Charles)

=== Early childhood centers ===
- Brenda Hunter Headstart (Lake Charles)
- J. D. Early Learning Center (Lake Charles)
- John F. Kennedy Early Learning Center (Lake Charles)

=== Other schools ===
- Lake Charles-Boston Academy of Learning (Lake Charles)
- Positive Connections (Lake Charles)

=== Charter schools ===
- Lake Charles Charter Academy (Lake Charles)
- Lake Charles College Prep (Lake Charles)
- Southwest Louisiana Charter Academy (Lake Charles)
