= Stephen Starring =

American football player (1961–2025)

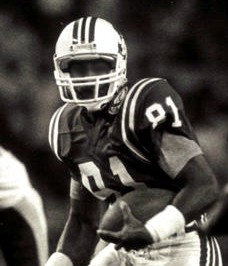
- Starring with the New England Patriots in 1984

No. 81
- Positions: Wide receiver, kick returner

Personal information
- Born: July 30, 1961; Baton Rouge, Louisiana, U.S.
- Died: October 18, 2025 (aged 64); Orange, Texas, U.S.
- Listed height: 5 ft 10 in (1.78 m)
- Listed weight: 172 lb (78 kg)

Career information
- High school: Vinton (Vinton, Louisiana)
- College: McNeese State
- NFL draft: 1983: 3rd round, 74th overall pick

Career history
- New England Patriots (1983–1987); Tampa Bay Buccaneers (1988); Detroit Lions (1988); Los Angeles Raiders (1989)*
- * Offseason or practice squad member only

Career NFL statistics
- Receptions: 120
- Receiving yards: 2,029
- Receiving touchdowns: 11
- Stats at Pro Football Reference

Stephen Dale Starring (/ˈstɛfɛn/ STEF-en; July 30, 1961 – October 18, 2025) was an American professional football player who was a wide receiver and return specialist for six seasons in the National Football League (NFL). He played college football for the McNeese State Cowboys.

== Biography ==
Starring was born in Baton Rouge, Louisiana. After attending Vinton High School, he played quarterback at McNeese State University. He was most valuable player for the Cowboys at the 1980 Independence Bowl and 1980 Offensive Player of the Year of the Southland Conference (SLC), gaining 1,980 yards of total offense, including 974 rushing yards, a school record for rushing yards by a quarterback. Starring finished his time at McNeese state with 3,083 passing yards (7th all time) and 1,906 rushing yards (12th). He also won three SLC track and field titles, two in the high hurdles and one in the long jump, and was named All-American for track and field.

In 1983, Starring was selected 74th overall by the Patriots in the third round of the NFL draft. He went on to play wide receiver for six seasons for the New England Patriots, Detroit Lions, and Tampa Bay Buccaneers. In 1985 he was the NFL's seventh leading kickoff returner with 1,012 kick return yards and went on to play in Super Bowl XX as a member of the Patriots, where he caught two passes for 39 yards and returned seven kickoffs for 153 yards. He was inducted into the McNeese State University Hall of Fame in 2000. Starring finished his career with 120 receptions for 2,029 yards and 11 touchdowns, along with 2,389 yards returning kickoffs.

Starring died on October 18, 2025, at the age of 64.
