= Starks High School =

Starks Public School

Location
- 137 Highway 109; Starks, (Calcasieu Parish), Louisiana 70661; United States; 30.3166°N 93.6626°W

Information
- Type: Public K-12 school
- Established: 1927
- School district: Calcasieu Parish School Board
- Principal: Jeff Sanders
- Staff: 37.63 (FTE)
- Enrollment: 312 (2023-24)
- Student to teacher ratio: 8.29
- Colors: Red and black
- Mascot: Panther
- Nickname: Panthers
- Website: starks.cpsb.org

Starks Public School is a K-12 school in Starks, Louisiana, United States. It is a part of Calcasieu Parish Public Schools.

As of 2016 the school had 351 students. The high school had an enrollment of 101 students.

== Athletics ==
Starks High athletics competes in the LHSAA.
