= Ken Bahnsen =

American football player (born 1930)

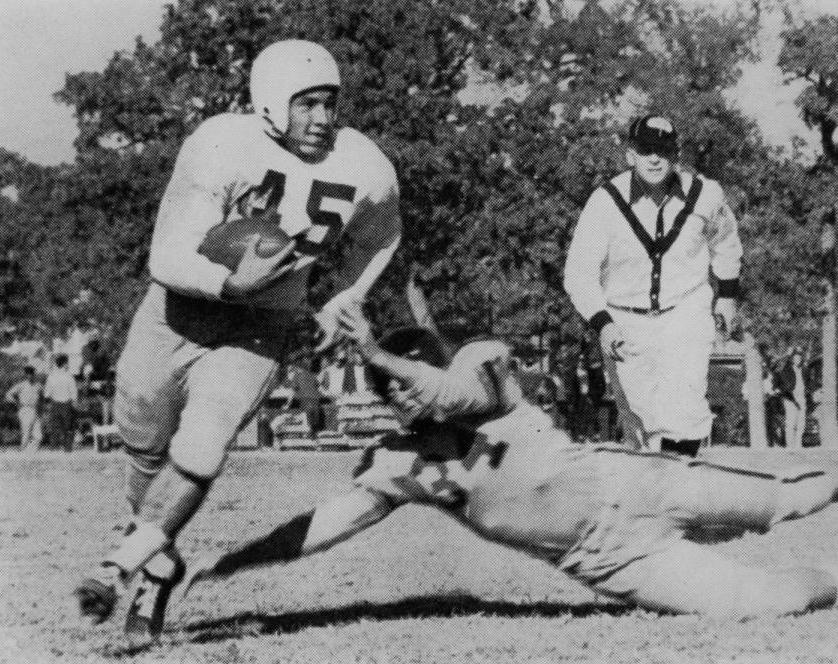
- Photograph of a North Texas State College football game against Midwestern State. Ken Bahnsen (#45) avoids being tackled during this Homecoming game. UNT won 61-0.

No. 27
- Position: Fullback

Personal information
- Born: February 19, 1930 (age 96); Vinton, Louisiana, U.S.
- Listed height: 5 ft 10 in (1.78 m)
- Listed weight: 200 lb (91 kg)

Career information
- High school: Vinton
- College: North Texas
- NFL draft: 1953: 21st round, 248th overall pick

Career history
- San Francisco 49ers (1953)

Career NFL statistics
- Rushing yards: 1
- Rushing average: 1
- Return yards: 21
- Stats at Pro Football Reference

Kenneth Antone Bahnsen (born February 19, 1930) is an American former professional football player who was a fullback for the San Francisco 49ers of the National Football League (NFL). He played college football for the North Texas State Eagles (now North Texas Mean Green) from 1950 to 1952. There, he set net school career rushing and scoring records while in the Eagles' backfield. After his professional career ended, he became a longtime North Texas assistant football coach.

He also coached the Eagles' tennis team to consecutive Missouri Valley Conference championships in 1966 and 1967.

Bahnsen was inducted into the North Texas Athletic Hall of Fame in 1991.

Bahnsen attended Vinton High School in Vinton, Louisiana.

The Ken Bahnsen Gym was named after him in a dedication ceremony in 2005.
