= Texas State Highway 12 =

Highway in Texas

State Highway 12

Route information
- Maintained by TxDOT
- Length: 19.6 mi (31.5 km)
- Existed: August 27, 1959–present

Major junctions
- West end: I-10 / US 90 in Vidor
- East end: LA 12 near Deweyville

Location
- Country: United States
- State: Texas
- Counties: Orange, Newton

Highway system
- Highways in Texas; Interstate; US; State; Former; Toll; Loops; Spurs; FM/RM; Park; Rec
← RE 11	→ Loop 12

State Highway 12 (SH 12) is a west–east state highway in the U.S. state of Texas that runs from Interstate 10 (I-10) in Vidor to the Louisiana state line at Deweyville. The route was designated on August 27, 1959, as a renumbering of SH 235 to match the numbering of Louisiana Highway 12 (LA 12), with which it connects.

== Route description ==
SH 12 begins at an intersection with I-10 and US 90 on the north side of Vidor, and travels to the northeast. It travels through lightly populated country before reaching the Sabine River at Deweyville. The route continues into Louisiana as Louisiana Highway 12.

== History ==
Historic SH 12

SH 12 was one of the original twenty five state highways proposed on June 21, 1917. It was an ambitious undertaking to construct a border-to-border highway hugging the southern Texas coast and border with Mexico, and was to be named the 'Jefferson Davis Memorial Highway.'

In 1917 the route followed present day Interstate 10 eastward from El Paso to roughly Esperanza. From there the road was proposed to go to Presidio (not built) and followed FM 170 from there to near Lajitas. It was proposed from there to hug the Rio Grande through Big Bend and towards Langtry (again, never built) where it would have met up with present day U.S. Highway 90. On US 90, the road would have gone into Del Rio and, via present day US 277, into Eagle Pass and through to Paso de Francia via present day FM 1021 and FM 1472 to Laredo. The Paso de Francia to Laredo segment was again, at the time never built. From Laredo to Pharr the road would have followed present day U.S. Highway 83. At Pharr, a spur of SH 12 would have continued east on US 83 to Brownsville. The main road went north on from Pharr on U.S. Highway 281 to Falfurrias then East on SH 285 into Riviera and north on U.S. Highway 77 towards Victoria, through to Houston on U.S. Highway 59 and finally US 90 to Orange. The route from Kingsville to Brownsville was determined on July 3, 1917.

Many of the roads in West and South Texas did not exist as planned (and still do not), and the technology available in 1919 was not up to the task of building so many miles of non-existent roadway quickly and efficiently. This led to SH 12 being rerouted many times, each time trying to keep it as a border-to-border highway, hugging the southern borderline. On November 20, 1917, SH 12 was rerouted into Corpus Christi via present day Interstate 37, U.S. Highway 181 and SH 35 into Rockport, Texas. The road then doublebacked, via SH 188 and FM 136 to Bayside. From here, another proposed road would have met back with US 77 into Victoria.

In late July 1917, the segment from El Paso, to near Lobo was rerouted to instead go to a proposed New Mexico crossing, due south into Van Horn, via SH 54 and continued to near Valentine, Texas over US 90. By 1919, the road again was proposed to bypass Big Bend, meeting up again with current US 90 in Sanderson, meeting up with its old alignment in Langtry. By 1919, SH 12 then terminated far short of Orange in Rosenberg. Much like other highways at the time, multiple alternate routings have been created using the same number, and SH 12 was no exception. SH 12A was designated on December 17, 1918 via present day SH 60 from Wharton to Matagorda.SH 12B was designated on March 18, 1919, from Beeville through Oakville, Tilden, and Gardendale, to Eagle Pass as a bypass if SH 12 between these places could not be built. The New Mexico border crossing was rerouted to the current U.S. Highway 180 crossing. On March 15, 1920, The Rio Grande hugging Big Bend segment was completely abandoned, with SH 12 now using the current US 90 highway from Valentine to Alpine to Sanderson. The road from Del Rio, Eagle Pass, Laredo to Pharr was still proposed, and sections had been built west of Pharr. However, not sure if that road would be built either, a cut-off SH 12A was designated on February 22, 1921 from Laredo to Hebbronville which would eventually become SH 359 and SH 44 into Robstown where it met up with the original SH 12. The Matagorda-Wharton segment was renamed SH 12C. On August 21, 1923, SH 12 had lost much of its assignment, being mostly confined to south and southeast Texas. The Eagle Pass-Laredo and Refugio-Rockport segments had never been built. The section of SH 12 from Corpus Christi to Gregory was transferred to the new SH 16, and the section of SH 12 from Gregory to Rockport was handed over to the new SH 57. SH 12C was handed over to the new SH 60. SH 12 at this time followed the routing from Brownsville via Pharr to Alice. From Alice, SH 12 followed SH 359 to Skidmore, US 181 to Beeville, and US 59 to Rosenberg. SH 12B was cancelled and reassigned to the old route of SH 12 from Pharr to Laredo. In 1926, US 83, US 96 and US 77 were overlaid on most of SH 12. On March 19, 1928, SH 12B became part of an extension of SH 2. On March 18, 1929, the section of SH 2 from Laredo to Pharr was changed back to SH 12B. On August 6, 1929, SH 12B became part of an extension of SH 4. On that same day, SH 12 was truncated to Pharr, with the portion south of there being transferred to SH 4. On November 16, 1929, SH 12 was to be built through Fannin Park. On March 19, 1930 SH 12 was rerouted to bypass the park, and the section from Fannin to Fannin Park was renumbered SH 162. On June 24, 1931, SH 12 was rerouted over SH 12A from Laredo to Alice, with the old route to Pharr being transferred to SH 66. The portion of SH 12A from Alice to Robstown became an extension of SH 128. On December 21, 1938, SH 12 Loop was designated in Laredo. On September 26, 1939, the original route was cancelled completely, its mileage taken over by US 59. SH 12 Loop was renumbered as Loop 20 (Laredo).

== Major intersections ==
County	Location	mi	km	Destinations	Notes
Orange	Vidor	0.0	0.0	I-10 / US 90 to FM 105	I-10 exit 861A
Orange	Vidor	2.0	3.2	FM 1132 (Evangeline Drive) to I-10 / FM 105	
Orange		7.8	12.6	FM 1136 south to I-10	
Orange	Mauriceville	9.4	15.1	SH 62 – Buna, Bridge City	
Newton		16.6	26.7	SH 87 – Newton, Orange	
Newton	Deweyville	19.3	31.1	Spur 272 south	
Newton		19.6	31.5	LA 12 east – Dequincy	Louisiana state line (Deweyville Swing Bridge over Sabine River)
1.000 mi = 1.609 km; 1.000 km = 0.621 mi
