= David LaFleur =

American football player (born 1974)

No. 89
- Position: Tight end

Personal information
- Born: January 29, 1974 (age 52); Lake Charles, Louisiana, U.S.
- Listed height: 6 ft 7 in (2.01 m)
- Listed weight: 272 lb (123 kg)

Career information
- High school: Westlake (Westlake, Louisiana)
- College: LSU
- NFL draft: 1997: 1st round, 22nd overall pick

Career history
- Dallas Cowboys (1997–2000)

Awards and highlights
- First-team All-American (1996); 2× First-team All-SEC (1994, 1996)

Career NFL statistics
- Games played: 60
- Receptions: 85
- Receiving yards: 729
- Touchdowns: 12
- Stats at Pro Football Reference

David Alan LaFleur (born January 29, 1974) is an American former professional football player who was a tight end for the Dallas Cowboys of the National Football League (NFL). He played college football for the LSU Tigers, earning All-American honors in 1996, and was selected by the Cowboys in the first round of the 1997 NFL draft.

== Early life ==
LaFleur attended Westlake High School, where he played tight end and defensive end. He also practiced basketball and track.

As a junior, he had 31 receptions for 657 yards and 8 touchdowns. In his last year, he posted 31 receptions for 652 yards and 5 touchdowns, while being named the Louisiana High School player of the year, All-American, and being part of the USA Today All-USA high school football team. He finished his high school career with 81 receptions for 1,758 yards and 18 touchdowns.

== College career ==
LaFleur accepted a football scholarship from Louisiana State University. As a redshirt freshman, he played in every game with his first start coming against the University of Florida, while making 8 receptions for 59 yards.

His blocking was so impressive, that as a sophomore after having only 21 receptions (fourth on the team) for 263 yards and 2 touchdowns, he was still voted All-SEC. He also was the first Tiger tight end since 1984 to score twice in a game, as he recorded 3 receptions for 59 yards with touchdown receptions of 35 and 12 yards against the University of Southern Mississippi.

As a junior, he registered 12 receptions for 120 yards, after missing 3 games with a knee injury. As a senior, he had 30 catches for 439 yards and 3 touchdowns, becoming the first school tight end to lead the team in receiving since 1980. At the end of the season, he was named All-American, All-SEC, LSU offensive MVP and played in the Senior Bowl. He finished his career with 71 receptions for 881 yards and 5 touchdowns, while starting 28 out of his final 30 games and being active in a total of 41 contests.

== Professional career ==
Pre-draft measurables
Height	Weight	Arm length	Hand span	40-yard dash	10-yard split	20-yard split	Vertical jump	Broad jump	Bench press
6 ft 7 1/8 in (2.01 m)	280 lb (127 kg)	34 1/2 in (0.88 m)	11 1/2 in (0.29 m)	4.84 s	1.69 s	2.83 s	30.5 in (0.77 m)	9 ft 4 in (2.84 m)	17 reps
All values from NFL Combine

After the team's offense suffered because of the health of Jay Novacek and the lack of production at tight end, the Dallas Cowboys were determined to solve the situation in the 1997 NFL draft, even going as far as soliciting quarterback's Troy Aikman input in private workouts of the two top ranked players at the position (Tony Gonzalez and LaFleur), that were reported by the Sports Illustrated magazine. It was eventually published in the media that both the Cowboys and Aikman, had him rated ahead of Gonzalez, because they considered him to possess a rare combination of skills.

The Cowboys traded up with the Philadelphia Eagles moving from the 25th to the 22nd position, in exchange for third (#70-Brian Alford) and fifth round (#155-Luther Broughton) draft choices, to select LaFleur in the first round (22nd overall). As a rookie, he complemented veteran Eric Bjornson, mostly blocking for the team (recording five pancake blocks in one game), because his receiving production was disappointing, making 18 receptions for 122 yards, 6.8 yards average and 2 touchdowns.

In 1998, he was named the starter, posting 20 receptions (fifth on the team) for 176 yards and 2 touchdowns (tied for third on the team). Against the New Orleans Saints, he suffered a sprained PCL in his right knee, which forced him to miss the last 3 games. He returned in the playoffs against the Arizona Cardinals, but did not record a reception in the 7-20 loss.

In 1999, during the offseason he suffered a broken right fibula in minicamp and underwent a microscopic lumbar discectomy to repair a herniated disc. He still was able to have the best season of his short career, registering 35 receptions for 322 yards, while leading the NFC tight ends and his team with 7 touchdowns, becoming just the second tight end in franchise history to reach this number.

In 2000, besides a groin and ankle injury that affected him during the season, LaFleur had back problems that dated back to his college years and it started to affect his play. He was passed on the depth chart by veteran Jackie Harris, while registering only 12 receptions for 109 yards and one touchdown in 15 games (10 starts).

On August 21, 2001, he was waived injured when he failed a physical exam with a herniated disk in his back. He finished his career with 85 receptions for 729 yards and 12 touchdowns in 60 games (44 starts).

=== NFL statistics ===
Year	Team	Games	Receptions	Yards	Yards per Reception	Longest Reception	Touchdowns	First Downs	Fumbles	Fumbles Lost
1997	DAL	16	18	122	6.8	17	2	5	1	0
1998	DAL	13	20	176	8.8	24	2	11	1	0
1999	DAL	16	35	322	9.2	25	7	17	0	0
2000	DAL	15	12	109	9.1	19	1	7	0	0
Career		60	85	729	8.6	25	12	40	2	0
