= Johnny Dowers =

American actor, writer, and musician

John Wayne "Johnny" Dowers (born March 16, 1971, in DeQuincy, Louisiana) is an American actor, writer, and musician best known for his role as Detective Tim Cooper on FX's drama, The Bridge. He co-wrote and starred in the 2010 comedy Pickin' & Grinnin'. Dowers also appeared in Anger Management as Ray James II, a pimp in Charlie's therapy group in 2013.
