= Sam Houston High School (Louisiana) =

Location
- 880 Sam Houston Jones Parkway; Lake Charles, (Calcasieu Parish), Louisiana 70611; United States; 30.3006°N 93.2117°W

Information
- Type: Public high school
- School district: Calcasieu Parish School Board
- Superintendent: Dr. Jason VanMetre
- Principal: Brandi White
- Staff: 78.19 (FTE)
- Enrollment: 1,191 (2023-24)
- Student to teacher ratio: 15.23
- Colors: Purple and gold
- Mascot: Bronco
- Nickname: Broncos
- Rival: Westlake High School
- Yearbook: Stampede
- Website: samhouston.cpsb.org

Sam Houston High School is a high school in an unincorporated area north of Lake Charles, Louisiana, United States. It is a part of Calcasieu Parish Public Schools and was established in 1961.

== History ==
The school opened in 1961 to serve the unincorporated area of Lake Charles north of English Bayou, called Moss Bluff; it succeeded Gillis High School. The school began with an enrollment of 300 students in grades 7–12. Gabe Barkate was the first principal.

In 1976, with the opening of Moss Bluff Middle School, Sam Houston High School transitioned to a traditional 9–12 grade high school.

On January 11, 1982, the school was destroyed by fire, except for the gymnasium. At about 7:10 that morning, the decision had been made not to open the school that day because low gas pressure made it impossible for maintenance staff to turn on the boilers and the classrooms were too cold. By 9 a.m., the roughly 15 teachers who had been at the school were sent home, although, according to the local fire chief, there were at least three people in the building at the time of the fire. At about 11 a.m., eyewitnesses reported two explosions and smoke coming from the school's west wing, near the chemistry lab. Some 50 firefighters from the surrounding areas were called to the fire, but the majority of the school burned to the ground. The fire was considered either a possible arson or the result of a gas problem, but the cause was not established. Students attended classes at their arch-rival Westlake High School & Moss Bluff Middle School until the school was rebuilt and reopened in February 1984.

In 2019 the school started the BYOD (Bring your own device) program, which was the only school in Louisiana at the time. After the passing of Louisiana Act 313, this program was phased out.

== Campus ==
The current complex includes, in addition to classrooms, administrative space, and faculty lounges: a football, baseball, and softball stadium, boys' and girls' basketball gymnasiums, an athletics fieldhouse, an agricultural education building, and a library and courtyard constructed in 2010–2012.

== Athletics ==
Sam Houston High athletics competes in the LHSAA.

== Notable alumni ==
- David Filo (Valedictorian, Class of 1984), co-founder of Yahoo!.
- Ralph Eggleston, (Class of 1984) animator for Pixar Animation Studios.
