= Charleston Hotel =

- U.S. National Register of Historic Places
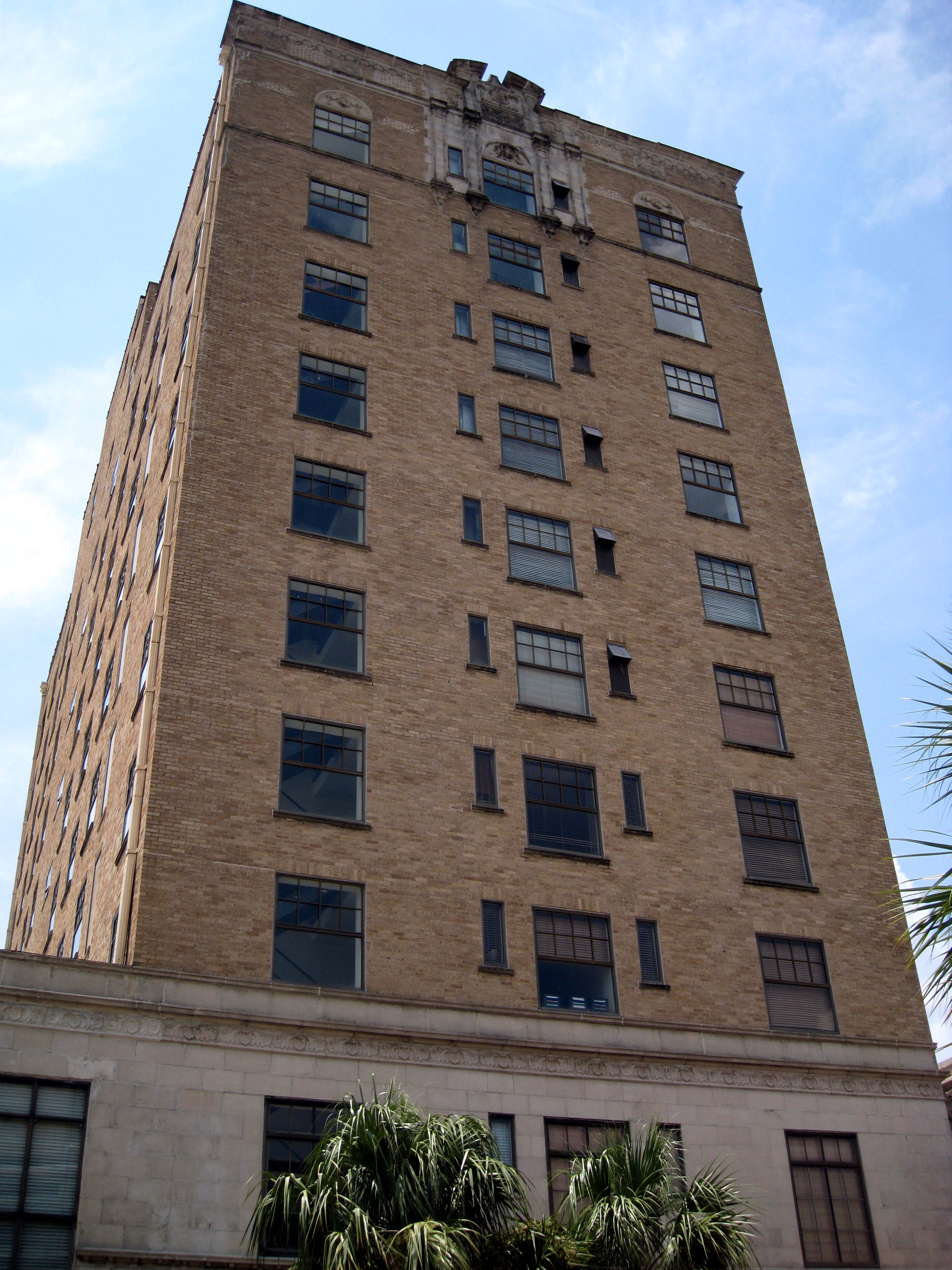

- Location within Louisiana Location within the United States
- Location: 900 Ryan Street, corner with West Pujo Street, Lake Charles, Louisiana
- Coordinates: 30°13′40″N 93°13′04″W
- Area: 0.14 acres (0.057 ha)
- Built: 1929
- Built by: W.P. Weber & H.T. McClain
- Architect: Joseph Finger and Livesay Williams
- Architectural style: Classical Beaux Arts
- NRHP reference No.: 82002762
- Added to NRHP: May 27, 1982

The Charleston Hotel is an historic hotel in the City of Lake Charles in the U.S. state of Louisiana. It is located at 900 Ryan Street, at the corner with West Pujo Street.

The building was added to the National Register of Historic Places May 27, 1982.

== History ==
The hotel initial proposal contained eight stories but when work began in 1928 this was increased to ten floors. The estimated cost increased $50,000 to $600,000, and the hotel was completed in 1929, during the administration of Mayor Henry J. Geary.

When completed the building was the city's first skyscraper. The bottom two stories were faced with cement molded to resemble cut stone blocks and the upper eight stories were faced with tan brick in the Neo-Classical Beaux Arts style. It is topped by a stone cornice and some windows on the top story are surrounded by pilasters and elaborate spandrel panels. The interior of the building has a two-story lobby, elaborate tile work, and balconies on the upper level. The Charleston Ballroom, located on the second floor, has Corinthian pilasters and weekly dances were held on the open roof garden.

== Current ==
As of 2014, the structure has undergone extensive renovation with rooms converted into shops with event space throughout the building.

== See also ==
- National Register of Historic Places listings in Calcasieu Parish, Louisiana
- Lake Charles, Louisiana
