= Tierre Brown =

American basketball player (born 1979)

Personal information
- Born: June 3, 1979 (age 47) Iowa, Louisiana, U.S.
- Listed height: 6 ft 2 in (1.88 m)
- Listed weight: 190 lb (86 kg)

Career information
- High school: Iowa (Iowa, Louisiana)
- College: McNeese State (1997–2001)
- NBA draft: 2001: undrafted
- Playing career: 2001–2015
- Position: Point guard / shooting guard
- Number: 10, 3, 6, 5

Career history
- 2001–2002: Houston Rockets
- 2002–2004: North Charleston Lowgators
- 2003: Cleveland Cavaliers
- 2004: New Orleans Hornets
- 2004–2005: Los Angeles Lakers
- 2006: Albuquerque Thunderbirds
- 2006–2007: Eldo Napoli
- 2007–2008: Cimberio Varese
- 2008: Anaheim Arsenal
- 2009: Idaho Stampede
- 2010–2011: Al-Rayyan
- 2012: Toros de Aragua
- 2013–2014: Tsmoki-Minsk
- 2015: Gaiteros del Zulia

Career highlights
- NBDL Most Valuable Player (2004); 2× All-NBDL First Team (2003, 2004)
- Stats at NBA.com
- Stats at Basketball Reference

Tierre Brown (born June 3, 1979) is an American basketball player.

== Career ==
Brown graduated from McNeese State University and began his career with the NBA's Houston Rockets in 2001. He played fifteen games for the Cleveland Cavaliers in 2002–03, and three games for the New Orleans Hornets for the 2003–04 season. Brown would spend the 2004-05 NBA season with the Los Angeles Lakers, and played in most of their contests that year. He was named the MVP of the NBA Development League in 2004. His stint with the Raptors was short lived as he was cut on October 22, joining the NBA Development League's Albuquerque Thunderbirds in January 2006. Led The Team To The NBDL Championship. He then switched to Europe, playing with Italy's Basket Napoli, agreeing to part ways in February 2007.

Brown played a total of 134 games in his NBA career and holds averages of 3.9 points, 1.2 rebounds, and 2 assists per game. His final NBA game was on April 11, 2005, in a 97 - 108 loss to the Phoenix Suns where Brown recorded 8 points, 2 steals, 1 rebound and 1 assist.

On November 7, 2008, Brown was selected with the 9th pick in the first round of the 2008 NBA Development League draft by the Anaheim Arsenal.

On February 27, 2015, Brown signed with Gaiteros del Zulia of Venezuela.
