= Westlake High School (Louisiana) =

Location
- 1000 Garden Drive; Westlake, (Calcasieu Parish), Louisiana 70669; United States; 30.2613°N 93.2643°W

Information
- Type: Public high school
- Established: 1914
- School district: Calcasieu Parish School Board
- Principal: Bryan Trahan
- Staff: 45.29 (FTE)
- Enrollment: 493 (2023-2024)
- Student to teacher ratio: 10.89
- Colors: Orange and black
- Mascot: Ram
- Nickname: Rams
- Rival: Sam Houston High School
- Newspaper: "Ram-Page"
- Yearbook: Ram-Ler
- Website: westlake.cpsb.org

Westlake High School is a high school in Westlake, Louisiana. It is a part of Calcasieu Parish Public Schools and was established in 1914.

== History ==
Until Westlake High's founding in 1914, Westlake students attended Lake Charles High School. Mr. S.P. Arnett organized the establishment of a high school building on Sulphur Avenue. The building was made of red bricks painted yellow, and became known as the "yellow brick building". An auditorium/gymnasium, called the "red brick building," opened in 1936. The first yearbook, "Big Horn," was printed in 1946. That year, homecoming and American football were established. A new high school building was added to the Sulphur Avenue campus in 1949.

The high school moved to its current campus on Garden Drive in January 1967, and the Sulphur Avenue campus became known as S.P. Arnett Junior High School (now S.P. Arnett Middle School). The current Garden Drive building initially had 16 classrooms in 100,000 square feet (9,300 m^{2}) of space; additional classrooms were installed later.

== Campus ==
The current complex includes; along with classrooms, administrative space, and faculty lounges; two science rooms, a 1,000-seat auditorium, a library, a cafeteria, a band room, a vocational workshop, a writing and language laboratory.

== Athletics ==
Westlake High athletics competes in the LHSAA.

=== State Championships ===
Baseball

- (2) 1996, 2026

Football

- (1) 1953

Softball

- (1) 1992

=== State Runners-Up ===
Boys Basketball

- (1) 1955

Football

- (1) 2007

== Notable alumni ==
- David LaFleur (1992), professional football player for the Dallas Cowboys.
- Joshua Ledet (2010), Third-place finisher on American Idol.
