= Nate Livings =

American football player (born 1982)

No. 62, 71
- Position: Guard

Personal information
- Born: March 16, 1982 (age 44); Lake Charles, Louisiana, U.S.
- Listed height: 6 ft 4 in (1.93 m)
- Listed weight: 320 lb (145 kg)

Career information
- High school: Washington-Marion (Lake Charles, Louisiana)
- College: LSU
- NFL draft: 2006: undrafted

Career history
- Cincinnati Bengals (2006–2011); Dallas Cowboys (2012)

Awards and highlights
- BCS national champion (2003)

Career NFL statistics
- Games played: 68
- Games started: 63
- Stats at Pro Football Reference

Nathaniel Joseph Livings (born March 16, 1982) is an American former professional football player who was a guard in the National Football League (NFL) for the Cincinnati Bengals and the Dallas Cowboys. He played college football for the LSU Tigers.

== Early life ==
Livings attended Washington-Marion Magnet High School where he played defensive tackle. As a senior, he was named All-Southwest Louisiana after registering 124 tackles and 5 sacks.

He had academic eligibility problems and instead of going to a junior college, chose to sit out two full years taking correspondence courses. He received a scholarship from Louisiana State University, where he was a three-year starter and played every offensive line position except center. He appeared in 38 games (34 starts) and was a part of the 2003 championship team.

== Professional career ==
=== Cincinnati Bengals ===
Livings was signed by the Cincinnati Bengals as an undrafted free agent on May 2, 2006. He spent two seasons in the team's practice squad, until November 17, 2008, when he was promoted for depth purposes. He became a starter at left guard in the eleventh game of the season, and remained a starter in the following years.

=== Dallas Cowboys ===
Livings signed as a free agent with the Dallas Cowboys on March 16, 2012, with the intention of replacing Kyle Kosier. Although he started every game, his play didn't live up to expectations. On September 1, 2013, he was placed on the injured reserve list after missing most of the pre-season with a right knee injury, the same problem that bothered him for much of the previous year. He was released on September 5.
