= Anthony Pullard =

American basketball player (born 1966)

Personal information
- Born: June 23, 1966 (age 60) DeQuincy, Louisiana, U.S.
- Listed height: 6 ft 10 in (2.08 m)
- Listed weight: 244 lb (111 kg)

Career information
- High school: DeQuincy (DeQuincy, Louisiana)
- College: McNeese State (1985–1990)
- NBA draft: 1990: undrafted
- Playing career: 1990–1998
- Position: Power forward
- Number: 23

Career history
- 1990–1991: CAB Loja
- 1991–1992: Leuven Bears
- 1992: New Haven Skyhawks
- 1992–1993: Milwaukee Bucks
- 1993: Rockford Lightning
- 1993: CB Girona
- 1994: Sioux Falls Skyforce
- 1995: Gigantes de Carolina
- 1995–1996: Ovarense
- 1996–1997: Deportivo Roca
- 1997: Ortakoy S.K.
- 1997–1998: Club Atlético Cordón

Career highlights
- Southland Player of the Year (1990); 3× First-team All-Southland (1988–1990)
- Stats at NBA.com
- Stats at Basketball Reference

Anthony Quinn Pullard (born June 23, 1966) is an American former professional basketball player born in DeQuincy, Louisiana. He was a 6-foot-10-inch (208 cm), 235 pounds (107 kg) power forward and played collegiately at McNeese State University from 1985 to 1990. He also attended Odessa Junior College but did not play competitive basketball. He was named Sports Illustrated Player of the Week for March 5, 1990, after averaging 27.7 points and 13.3 rebounds in three wins, highlighted by a 35-point, 18-rebound performance in a 60–54 victory over North Texas on March 3, 1990.

Pullard signed with the Philadelphia 76ers of the NBA but was waived in July 1990. He signed with the Milwaukee Bucks in August, 1992, and played 8 games with them in the 1992-93 season, averaging 2.1 points and 1.0 rebound per contest. He was waived in January, 1993. Days later, he was signed by the Rockford Lightning of the CBA. According to the Canadian-based Latinbasket website, Pullard last played professionally in Ciudad Victoria, Mexico, in 1999.
