= Muller's Department Store =

- U.S. National Register of Historic Places
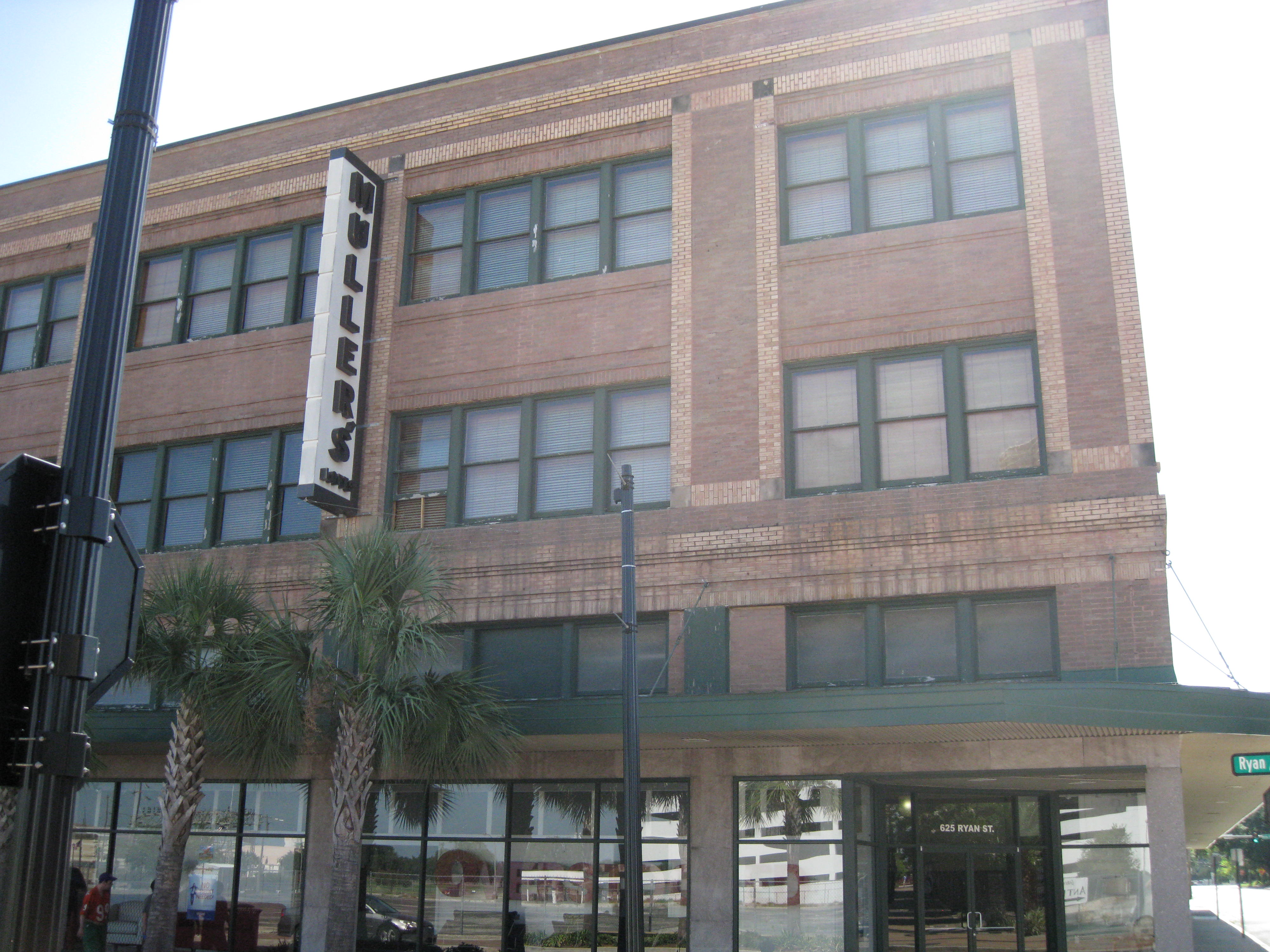

- Location within Louisiana Location within the United States
- Location: 619-625 Ryan Street, Lake Charles, Louisiana
- Coordinates: 30°13′51″N 93°12′59″W
- Area: less than one acre
- Built: 1913
- NRHP reference No.: 07000069 (original); 07000433 (increase)

Significant dates
- Added to NRHP: February 15, 2007
- Boundary increase: May 18, 2007

Muller's Department Store was a major department store, and it is the name of a three-story brick building now located at 625 Ryan Street in downtown Lake Charles, Louisiana. The building was built in 1913 and opened as a 45,000 square feet (4,200 m^{2}) store. It was expanded to the rear in 1949, adding about a third.

The building was listed on the National Register of Historic Places in 2007. Its boundaries were increased in the same year to include the nearby Berdon-Campbell Store at 619 Ryan Street, which was acquired by Muller's Department Store in February 1943.

At the time of its NRHP application, plans were underway for it to be renovated into apartments. The developer sought tax credits that would be tied to NRHP listing.

Today it serves as an apartment complex in the heart of downtown.

== See also ==
- National Register of Historic Places listings in Calcasieu Parish, Louisiana
- Lake Charles, Louisiana
