= Iowa High School =

Location
- 401 Miller Avenue; Iowa, (Calcasieu Parish), Louisiana 70647; United States; 30.245316°N 93.016877°W

Information
- Type: Public high school
- Motto: "Empowering all students to achieve"
- Established: 1919
- School district: Calcasieu Parish School Board
- Principal: Luke Dietz
- Staff: 75.33 (FTE)
- Enrollment: 1,051 (2023-2024)
- Student to teacher ratio: 13.95
- Colors: Purple and gold
- Athletics conference: District 3-3A
- Mascot: Yellow Jacket
- Nickname: Yellow Jackets
- Yearbook: Yellow Jacket
- Website: iowa.cpsb.org

Iowa High School (/aɪˈəˈweɪ/) EYE-uh-way) is a junior and senior high school (grades 6–12) in Iowa, Louisiana. It is a part of Calcasieu Parish Public Schools.

== History ==
One of the earliest schools in the Iowa area was located on the LeBleu family farm near the Chloe community in the mid-1880s, around the time Seaman A. Knapp, president of the Iowa State College of Agriculture, was working to demonstrate the suitability of the region for rice production. The modern Iowa High School was founded in 1919, and the first modern, brick school building in Iowa was constructed in 1920. To accomplish this, the Calcasieu Parish School Board in December 1919 sold $15,000 in bonds to The Hanchett Bond Company of Chicago.

== Athletics ==
The Iowa Yellow Jackets compete in Class 3A of the LHSAA.

In April 1965, the city's Lions Club proposed a resolution to the school board to dedicate the IHS football stadium to Jesse Edwin Cady, a longtime school board member who represented the area and who had died the previous month. The resolution passed unanimously.

Andre Sam, a defensive back who initially played at McNeese State University in nearby Lake Charles, would eventually transfer to Marshall University before finishing his college career at LSU of the Southeastern Conference.

On December 12, 2025, The Iowa Yellow Jackets defeated the North DeSoto Griffins in the LHSAA Non-Select Division II Football State Championships with a score of 50-43.

=== State Championships ===
- Baseball: 2007, 2023
- Cross Country: 2004
- Football: 2025

== Notable alumni ==
- Tierre Brown basketball player for the Houston Rockets and Los Angeles Lakers.
- Brian Johnson (long jumper) (1998), Olympic long jumper, two-time United States indoor long jump champion.
- Andre' Sam (2017), NFL player for the Philadelphia Eagles.
