= Brandon Winey =

American football player (born 1978)

No. 68, 76
- Position: Offensive tackle

Personal information
- Born: January 27, 1978 (age 48); Lake Charles, Louisiana, U.S.
- Listed height: 6 ft 7 in (2.01 m)
- Listed weight: 315 lb (143 kg)

Career information
- High school: Washington-Marion (Lake Charles)
- College: LSU
- NFL draft: 2001: 6th round, 164th overall pick

Career history
- Miami Dolphins (2001)*; Denver Broncos (2001); Seattle Seahawks (2002)*; Washington Redskins (2003); New York Giants (2004); Carolina Panthers (2005)*
- * Offseason or practice squad member only

Career NFL statistics
- Games played: 24
- Games started: 3
- Stats at Pro Football Reference

Brandon Joseph Winey (born January 27, 1978) is an American former professional football player who was an offensive tackle in the National Football League (NFL) for the Washington Redskins and New York Giants. He played college football for the LSU Tigers and was selected by the Miami Dolphins in the sixth round of the 2001 NFL draft. Winey attended Washington-Marion Magnet High School in Lake Charles, Louisiana. On April 12, 2014, Winey was arrested for the shooting of LSU player Tahj Jones after an argument. In January 2015, a grand jury declined to indict Winey.
