= Vinton High School =

Location
- 1603 Grace Avenue; Vinton, Louisiana; United States; 30°10′51″N 93°35′01″W

Information
- Established: 1913
- Status: Open
- NCES School ID: 220033000270
- Principal: Eric Heinen
- Teaching staff: 27.91 (on an FTE basis)
- Enrollment: 286 (2023-2024)
- Student to teacher ratio: 10.25
- Colors: Red and blue
- Mascot: Lion
- Nickname: Lions
- Website: vintonhigh.cpsb.org

Vinton High School is a Title I public high school located in the city of Vinton, Louisiana. It is a part of Calcasieu Parish Public Schools. The school colors are red and blue, and the Principal is Eric Heinen. The school had an enrollment of 296 for the 2020-21 school year. Students are offered dual enrollment at Sulphur High School to take Advanced Placement courses.

== Athletics ==
Vinton High athletics competes in the LHSAA. The current athletic director of the school is Mitch Manuel.

The following sports teams are offered to Vinton High School students:

- Baseball (varsity, junior varsity, freshman)
- Softball (varsity, junior varsity)
- Boys basketball (varsity, junior varsity)
- Girls basketball (varsity, junior varsity)
- Gridiron football (varsity, junior varsity)
- Volleyball (varsity)
- Boys soccer (varsity)
- Girls soccer (varsity)
- Boys track and field (varsity)
- Girls track and field (varsity)
- Boys wrestling (varsity)

=== State Championships ===
Football

- (2) 1935, 1936

== Notable alumni ==
- Ken Bahnsen (1948), professional football player (San Francisco 49ers) and college football coach (North Texas).
- Russell Hantz (1990), Survivor contestant, Survivor: Samoa runner-up in 2009.
- Bobby Kimball (1964), lead singer of Toto.
- Stephen Starring (1979), professional football player for the New England Patriots.
