= Washington-Marion Magnet High School =

Location
- 2802 Pineview Street; Lake Charles, (Calcasieu Parish), Louisiana 70615; United States; 30.2520°N 93.1742°W

Information
- Type: Public high school
- School district: Calcasieu Parish School Board
- Principal: Crystal Bowie
- Staff: 49.63 (on an FTE basis)
- Enrollment: 623 (2023-24)
- Student to teacher ratio: 12.55
- Colors: Green, gold, and black
- Mascot: Charger; Indian
- Team name: Chargin' Indians
- Website: washington-marion.cpsb.org

Washington-Marion Magnet High School is a magnet high school in Lake Charles, Louisiana, United States. It is a part of the Calcasieu Parish Public Schools.

As of 2018 it has 699 students and 90% of the staff is certified.

== Athletics ==
Washington-Marion Magnet High athletics compete in the LHSAA.

=== State Championships ===
- Boys Basketball: 1987, 2017

== Notable alumni ==
- Vincent Brisby (1989), professional football player, primarily for the New England Patriots
- Josh Gray (basketball) (2011), professional basketball player for the Northern Arizona Suns (attended, transferred before graduation)
- Eddie Kennison (1992), professional football player, primarily for the Kansas City Chiefs
- Nate Livings (2000), professional football player for the Cincinnati Bengals and Dallas Cowboys
- Brandon Winey (1996), professional football player for the Washington Redskins and New York Giants
- Mark Vital (2012), professional football player for the Kansas City Chiefs
