= DeQuincy High School =

Location
- 207 North Overton Street; DeQuincy, (Calcasieu Parish), Louisiana 70633; United States; 30.4513°N 93.4447°W

Information
- Type: Public high school
- Established: 1913
- School district: Calcasieu Parish School Board
- Principal: Zach Jones
- Staff: 28.63 (FTE)
- Enrollment: 303 (2023–2024)
- Student to teacher ratio: 10.58
- Colors: Red, white, and grey
- Mascot: Tiger
- Nickname: Tigers
- Yearbook: Decalla
- Website: dequincyhigh.cpsb.org

DeQuincy High School is a senior high school in DeQuincy, Louisiana, United States. It is a part of Calcasieu Parish Public Schools.

== History ==
A man named Mr. D. D. Hereford began teaching in DeQuincy in 1899. In 1910, a dedicated brick school building opened for 148 students. The Louisiana State Department of Education declared it an approved high school in 1913. The following year it moved into a new brick building and had an enrollment of about 700. A storm destroyed two of the school's buildings in 1918, and the school moved into rebuilt facilities. The Southern Association of Colleges and Secondary Schools began accrediting the school in 1920. One school building was destroyed by a fire in 1943. The high school moved to its present site in 1959–60. The school building that replaced the one destroyed by the first fire was destroyed by a 1970 fire that also damaged the gymnasium.

== Athletics ==
DeQuincy High athletics compete in the LHSAA.

=== State Runners-Up ===
Baseball

- (2) 1981, 2023

Football

- (4) 1939, 1942, 1949, 1995

Softball

- (1) 1999

== Notable people ==
- Scott Brown (baseball) (1974), professional baseball player for the Cincinnati Reds.
- Anthony Pullard (1984), professional basketball player for the Milwaukee Bucks.
- James Monroe Smith, former principal, later president of Louisiana State University.
