= Newton County Courthouse (Texas) =

- U.S. National Register of Historic Places
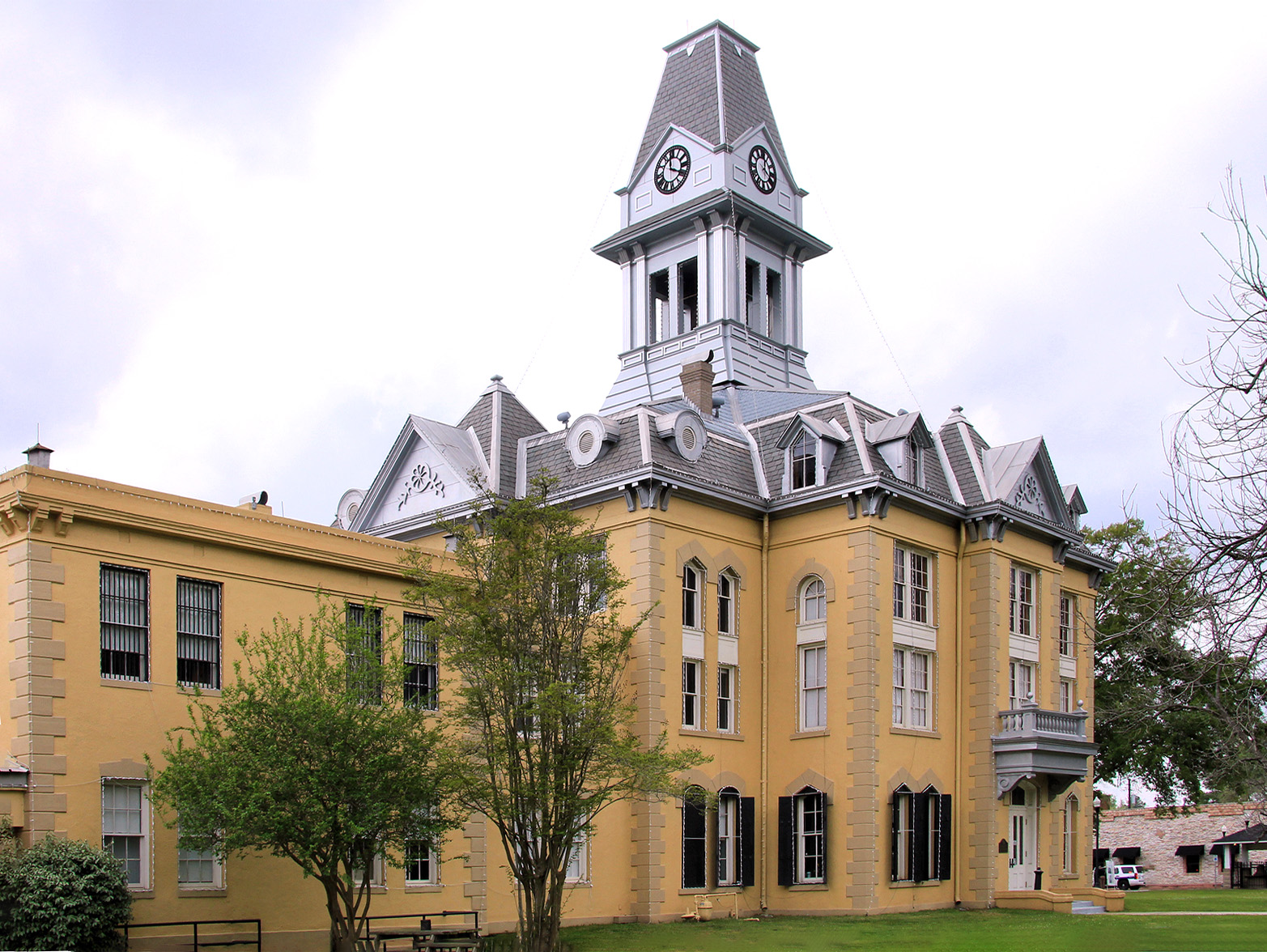

- Location within Texas Location within the United States
- Location: Off TX 190, Newton, Texas
- Coordinates: 30°50′51″N 93°45′35″W
- Area: less than one acre
- Built: 1902
- Architect: Martin & Moody
- Architectural style: Second Empire
- NRHP reference No.: 79002999
- Added to NRHP: July 19, 1979

Newton County Courthouse is a historic courthouse in Newton, Texas. It is listed on the National Register of Historic Places.

== History ==
The first courthouse in Newton County was constructed in Burkeville in 1848, two years after the establishment of Newton County. It was a two-story wooden frame structure and was abandoned when the county seat moved to Newton in 1853. It was demolished in the 1920s.

The third and current courthouse was built in 1902, replacing one constructed in 1853, also in Newton. It was designed and built by William Martin and Peter Moodie in the Second Empire style.

In 1912 and 1925 the interior was remodelled to provide more functional spaces. A new two-story jail was added as an annex to the courthouse in 1937.

The building was added to the National Register of Historic Places in 1997.

A fire attributed to faulty wiring in the attic near the bell tower took place on the evening of August 4, 2000. It burned through the roofs and compromised the structural integrity of the attic's wooden frame. Much of the interior was destroyed and many county documents and records were lost.

After the fire, the courthouse was restored and was rededicated in 2012.

== Description ==
The courthouse has three stories with walls of hand-made brick, a four faced clock and bell tower, and a stucco finish.

== See also ==
- National Register of Historic Places listings in Newton County, Texas
