= Cash Grocery and Sales Company Warehouse =

- U.S. National Register of Historic Places
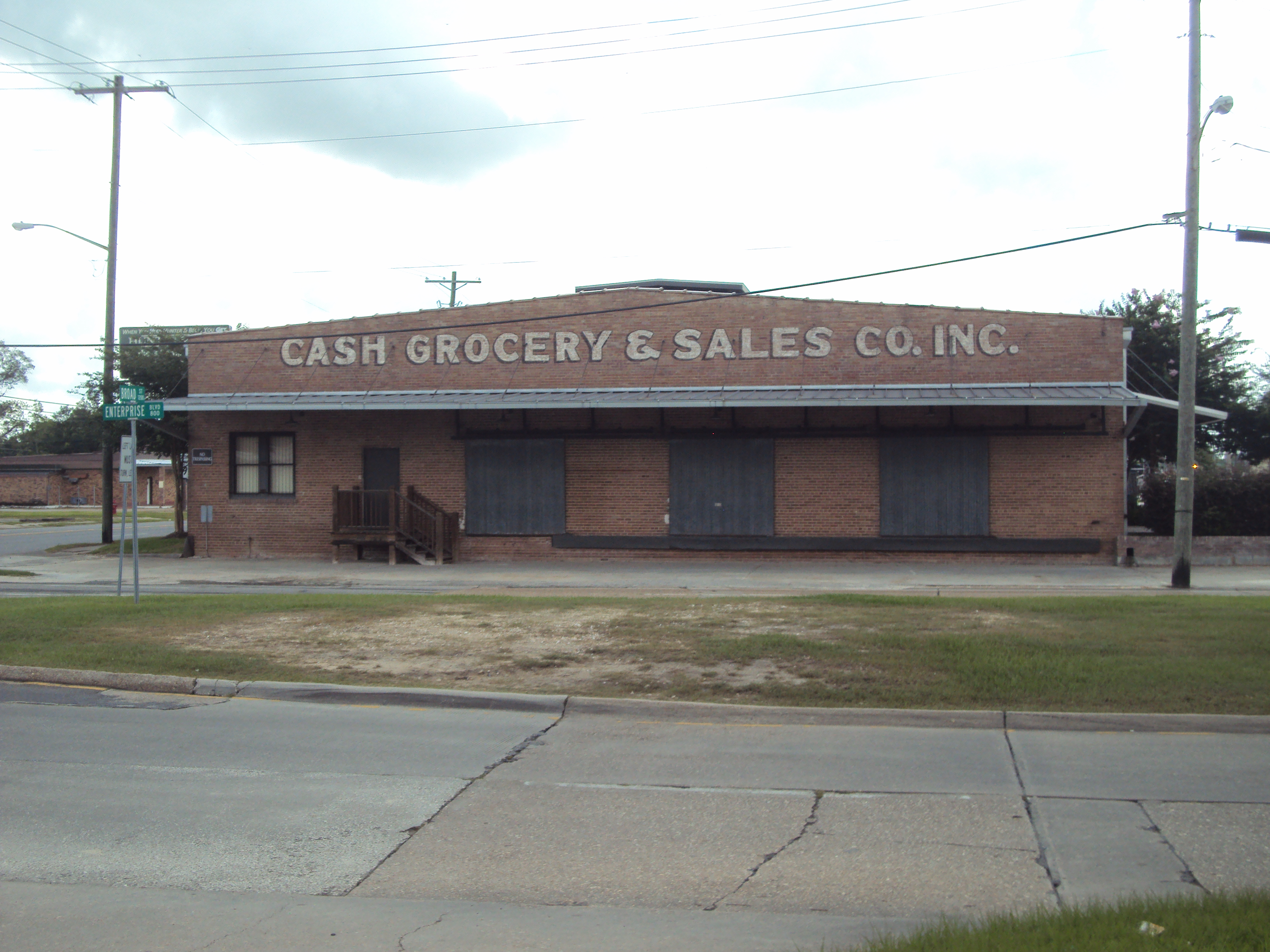

- Location within Louisiana Location within the United States
- Location: 801 Enterprise Blvd, Lake Charles, Louisiana
- Coordinates: 30°13′38″N 93°12′14″W
- Area: 1.1 acres (0.45 ha)
- Built: c. 1937
- Architect: Lewis Dunn of Dunn and Quinn
- Architectural style: 1930s warehouse
- NRHP reference No.: 10000395
- Added to NRHP: June 24, 2010

The Cash Grocery and Sales Company Warehouse, in Lake Charles, Louisiana, was built around 1937. It was listed on the National Register of Historic Places in 2010.

It is located at 801 Enterprise Blvd., on the corner of Broad Street, in Lake Charles. It has also been known as Cash and Carry or Cash and Carry Grocery Sales.

It is a 9,600 square feet (890 m^{2}) warehouse which functioned like a Sam's Club, selling wholesale goods to small grocers and other businesses.

It was designed by Lewis Dunn of architects Dunn & Quinn. It may have been built by Robert Thibodeaux.

It was closed in 1992. It was listed on the "Most Endangered Sites List" of the Calcasieu Historical Preservation Society. Its architectural detail was studied under a "Vanishing History" program grant from the National Park Service and the Louisiana Office of Cultural Development for Fifth Graders. The building was "rescued" by Rich and Donna Richard in 2007; its preservation was recognized by the Louisiana Trust for Historical Preservation in a 2009 Honor Award. It was listed on the National Register in 2010.
