= Lake Charles College Prep =

Lake Charles College Prep (LCCP)

Location
- 2801 Power Center Parkway; Lake Charles, (Calcasieu Parish), Louisiana 70607; United States; 30.1880°N 93.1741°W

Information
- Type: Public charter high school
- Established: 2014
- School district: Charter Schools USA
- Principal: Dr. Freddie Harrison III
- Staff: 19.15 (on an FTE basis)
- Enrollment: 517 (2021-22)
- Student to teacher ratio: 27.00
- Colors: Red, gold, and black
- Mascot: Trailblazer
- Nickname: Blazers
- Website: www.lakecharlescollegeprep.org

Lake Charles College Prep is a tuition-free Type II public charter school educating students in grades 9-12 who reside in Calcasieu Parish. It is independently-run by a community board and authorized by the elected Louisiana Board of Elementary and Secondary Education Enrollment at LCCP is based on parental choice rather than a geographical residential zone. As of 2018, it was one of 42 Type II charter schools in the state of Louisiana, meaning it was authorized through an appeal process or via an "academic crisis bypass."

== History ==
Louisiana's Charter School Law was originally enacted in 1995 (Act 192) as a pilot program allowing up to eight school districts to volunteer to participate. These districts could either grant charters to eligible groups or apply to the State Board of Elementary and Secondary Education (BESE) to operate a charter school themselves.

The law was substantially revised in 1997 (Act 477) to allow all school districts to participate, but the number of charter schools statewide was capped at 42. The 1997 act also allowed an “appeals-type” procedure under which an eligible group could submit its charter proposal directly to BESE if a local school board failed to approve it or if the local school board placed conditions on the approval of the charter which were unacceptable to the group.

Lake Charles College Prep was formed under the governance of the Lake Charles Charter Academy Foundation, whose board consisted of retired Louisiana Third Circuit Court of Appeal Judge Ulysses Gene Thibodeaux and retired Catholic priest Father Henry Mancuso.

The school opened on August 13, 2014, as the first new, public high school in the city of Lake Charles in 40 years with an initial enrollment of about 110 freshman students. Its first principal was Deborah Frank.

== Athletics ==
The Lake Charles College Prep Trailblazers compete in District 3-3A of the LHSAA.
