= Paul M. Hebert =

American judge (1907–1977)

Paul Macarius Hebert (1907–1977) was an American jurist who is best known as the longest serving Dean of the Louisiana State University's law school (now the Paul M. Hebert Law Center), serving in that role with brief interruptions from 1937 until his death in 1977. One such interruption occurred in 1947-1948 when he was appointed as a judge for the United States Military Tribunals in Nuremberg, and presided over the IG Farben Trial.

Hebert attended Catholic High School and later Louisiana State University, both located in Baton Rouge. While at LSU he was a member of the Zeta Zeta chapter of Delta Kappa Epsilon and was a member of the Friars Club.
