= Iowa, Louisiana =

- Town
- Town of Iowa
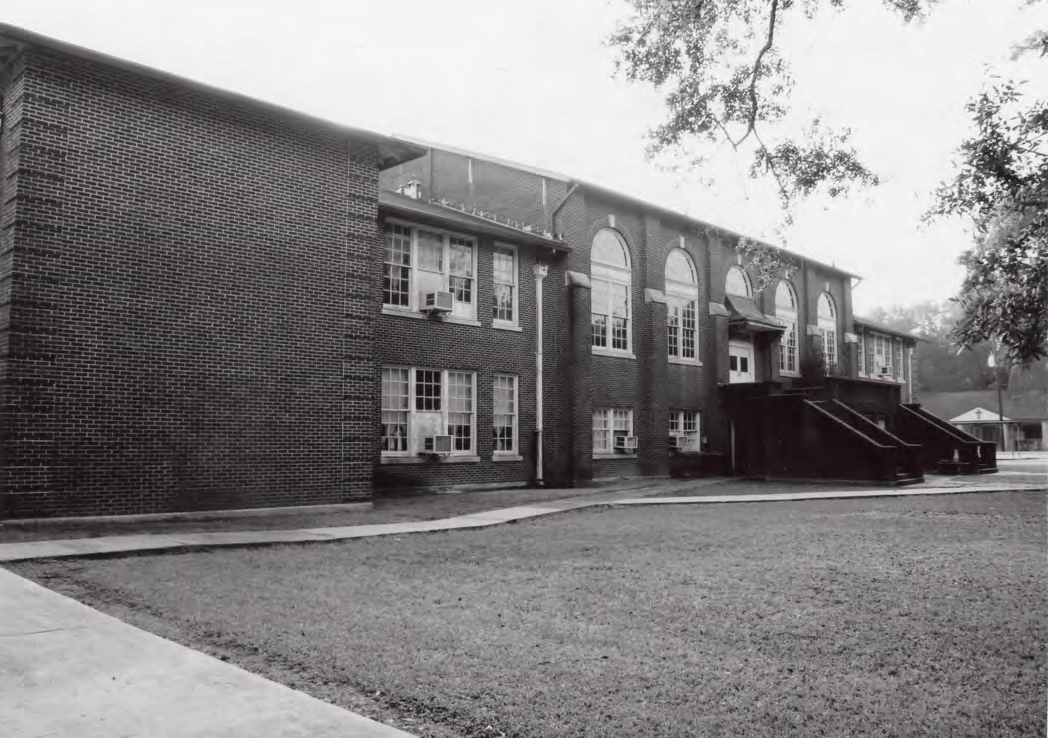
- 1937 Iowa High School

- Location of Iowa in Calcasieu Parish, Louisiana.

- Location of Louisiana in the United States
- Coordinates: 30°14′45″N 93°00′20″W
- Country: United States
- State: Louisiana
- Parish: Calcasieu

Area
  - Total: 3.43 sq mi (8.89 km^{2})
  - Land: 3.40 sq mi (8.80 km^{2})
  - Water: 0.039 sq mi (0.10 km^{2})
- Elevation: 20 ft (6.1 m)

Population (2020)
  - Total: 3,436
  - Density: 1,011.8/sq mi (390.64/km^{2})
- Time zone: UTC-6 (CST)
  - Summer (DST): UTC-5 (CDT)
- ZIP code: 70647
- Area code: 337
- FIPS code: 22-37445
- GNIS feature ID: 2405892
- Website: iowala.org

Iowa (/ˈaɪəweɪ/) is a town in Calcasieu Parish, Louisiana, United States. The population was 3,436 in 2020. It is part of the Lake Charles metropolitan statistical area.

== History ==
The history of this region is filled with stories of the early Midwestern settlers from Kansas, Illinois and Iowa, of the Acadians (Cajuns), and of Jean Lafitte's pirates. The community of Iowa was developed in the mid-19th century.

The railroad that cut through this country brought settlers who were lured to the prairie land for rice farming, cattle raising and later oil fields. Much of southwest Louisiana was developed by the North American Land and Timber Co. Seaman A. Knapp, president of the Iowa State College of Agriculture, was engaged in 1885 to demonstrate the suitability of the region for rice production. Knapp attracted a number of Iowans to settle the area. The settlers were lured to this area by advertisements published in newspapers in the midwestern states.

Iowa experienced a growth boom when oil was struck in 1930 and oil companies came to try their luck in the Iowa oil and gas fields. Even though this was the Great Depression era, Iowa thrived as more men came to work in the oil fields.

Today, oil continues to be a vital part of the town's economy, as are farming and cattle.

The town of "Iowa" is actually pronounced with the long A sound at the end ("EYE-uh-way"), opposed to the pronunciation of the state of Iowa.

== Geography ==
Iowa is located along the eastern edge of Calcasieu Parish. The eastern border of the town is the Jefferson Davis Parish line.

According to the United States Census Bureau, the town of Iowa has a total area of 3.17 square miles (8.22 km^{2}), of which 3.15 square miles (8.15 km^{2}) is land and 0.03 square miles (0.07 km^{2}), or 0.80%, is water.

== Demographics ==
Historical population
Census	Pop.	Note	%±
1960	1,857		—
1970	1,944		4.7%
1980	2,437		25.4%
1990	2,588		6.2%
2000	2,663		2.9%
2010	2,996		12.5%
2020	3,436		14.7%
2025 (est.)	3,301	▼	−3.9%
U.S. Decennial Census

Iowa racial composition as of 2020
Race	Number	Percentage
White (non-Hispanic)	2,082	60.59%
Black or African American (non-Hispanic)	1,059	30.82%
Native American	11	0.32%
Asian	19	0.55%
Pacific Islander	5	0.15%
Other/Mixed	172	5.01%
Hispanic or Latino	88	2.56%

As of the 2020 United States census, there were 3,436 people, 1,211 households, and 812 families residing in the town.

== Education ==
Iowa High School serves students both in Iowa and the surrounding area as part of the Calcasieu Parish Public Schools.

== Transportation ==
U.S. Route 90 passes through the center of town as 4th Street, and Interstate 10 passes along the northern edge, with access from exits 43 and 44. The southern terminus of U.S. Route 165 is at US 90 on the eastern town border. Lake Charles is 13 miles (21 km) to the west via Highways 90 or 10, and Lafayette is 63 miles (101 km) to the east. US 165 leads 85 miles (137 km) northeast to Alexandria.

== Notable person ==
- Tierre Brown, National Basketball Association player and MVP of the NBA Development League in 2004

== See also ==
- Lorilei
