= Fields, Louisiana =

- Unincorporated community
- Location within Louisiana Location within the United States
- Coordinates: 30°31′35″N 93°34′30″W
- Country: United States
- State: Louisiana
- Parish: Beauregard
- Elevation: 105 ft (32 m)
- Time zone: UTC-6 (Central (CST))
  - Summer (DST): UTC-5 (CDT)
- Area code: 337
- GNIS feature ID: 554398

Fields is an unincorporated community in Beauregard Parish, Louisiana. United States.

== Notable person ==
- Gil Dozier, Louisiana politician, was born in Fields.
