= DeQuincy, Louisiana =

- City
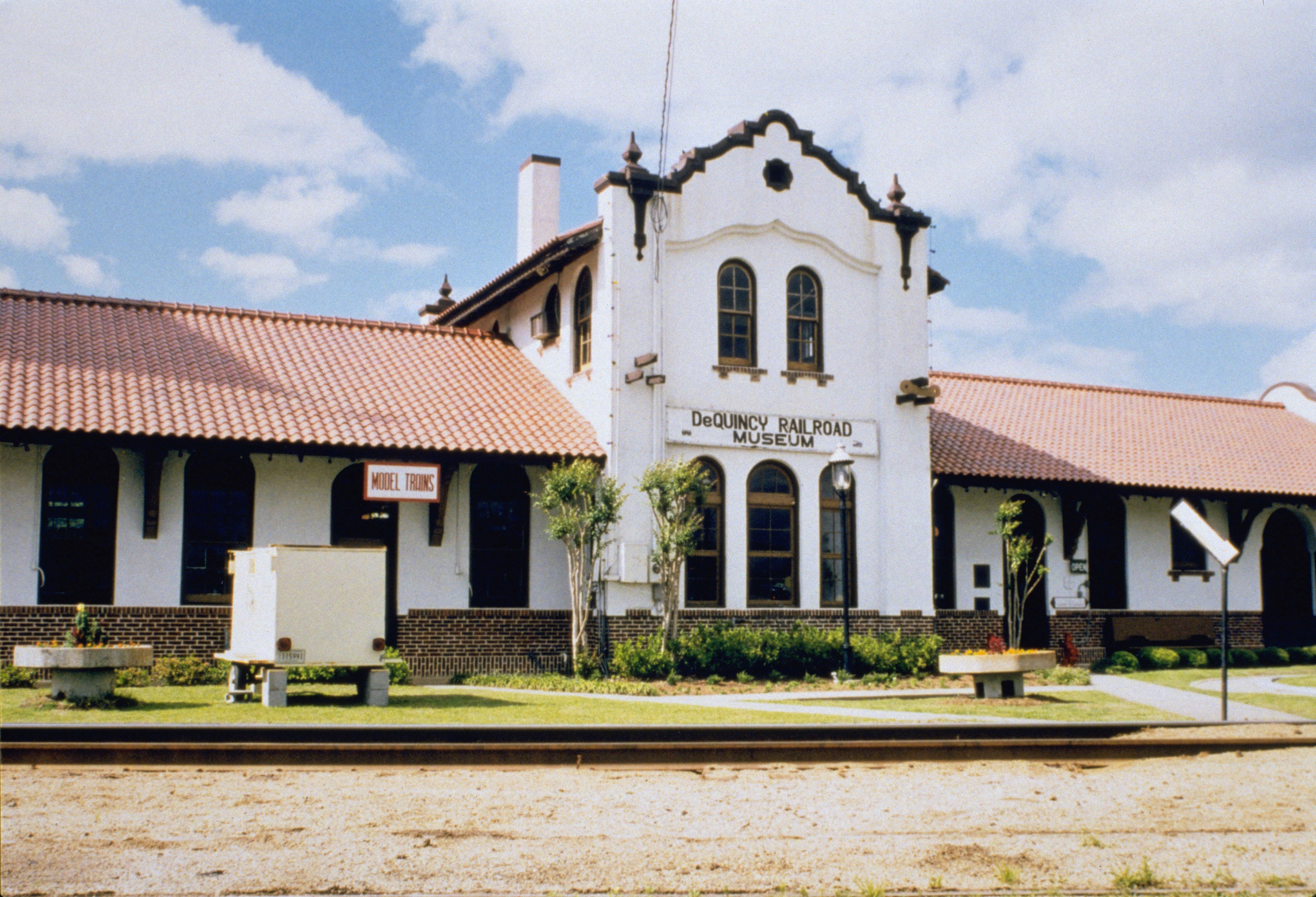
- DeQuincy Railroad Museum

- Location of DeQuincy in Calcasieu Parish, Louisiana.

- Location of Louisiana in the United States
- Coordinates: 30°26′56″N 93°26′44″W
- Country: United States
- State: Louisiana
- Parish: Calcasieu

Area
  - Total: 3.19 sq mi (8.27 km^{2})
  - Land: 3.19 sq mi (8.27 km^{2})
  - Water: 0 sq mi (0.00 km^{2})
- Elevation: 82 ft (25 m)

Population (2020)
  - Total: 3,144
  - Density: 984.9/sq mi (380.27/km^{2})
- Time zone: UTC-6 (CST)
  - Summer (DST): UTC-5 (CDT)
- ZIP code: 70633
- Area code: 337
- FIPS code: 22-20575
- GNIS feature ID: 2404219
- Website: www.dequincy.org

DeQuincy is the northernmost city in Calcasieu Parish, Louisiana, United States. As of the 2020 census, DeQuincy had a population of 3,144. DeQuincy is part of the Lake Charles metropolitan statistical area.

== History ==
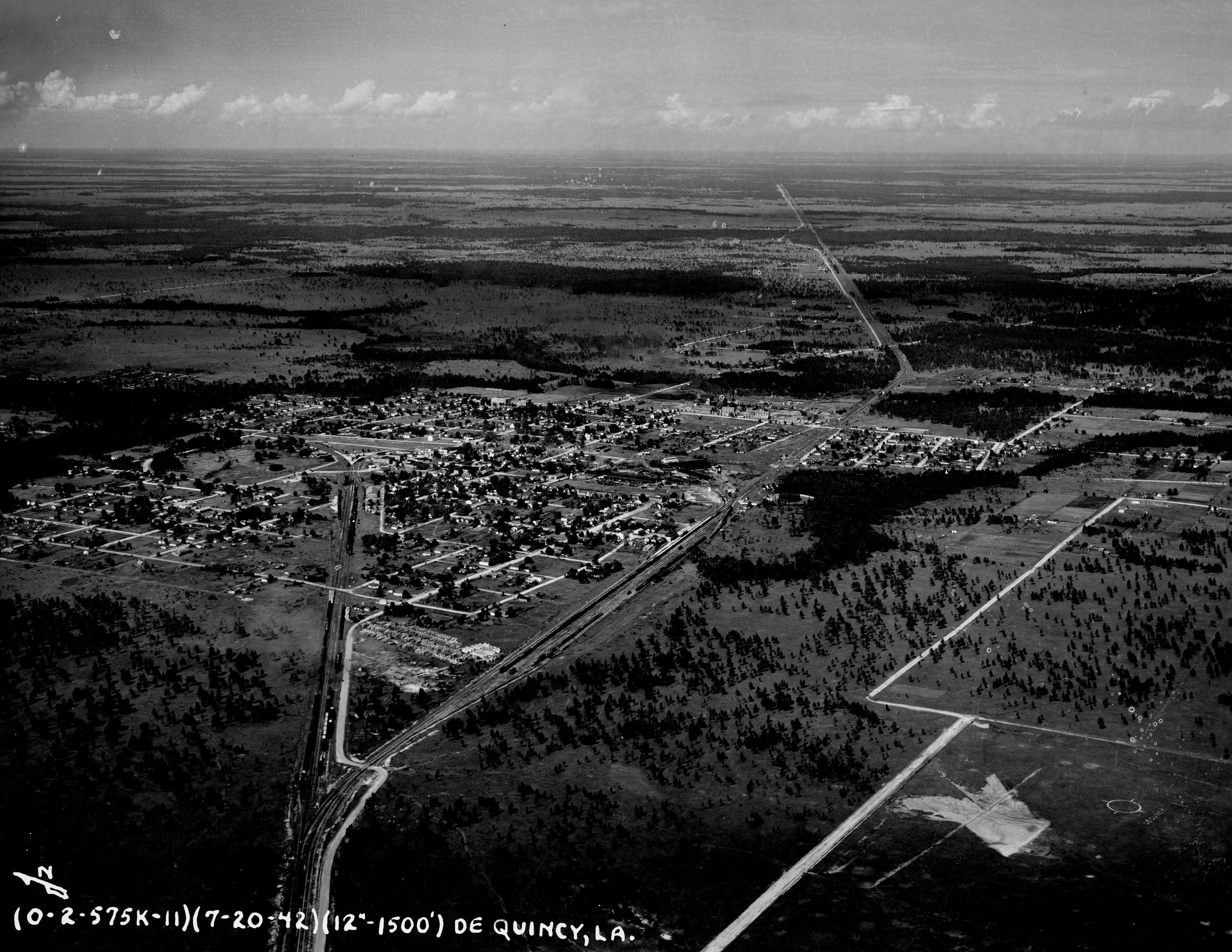
DeQuincy in 1942

DeQuincy was founded in 1897 as a railroad town with the Calcasieu, Vernon & Shreveport Railway Company (CV&S) having been completed and Arthur Stilwell's Kansas City, Shreveport & Gulf Railway Company (KCS&G), that was owned by the Kansas City, Pittsburg and Gulf Railroad (KCP&G), completed in 1897.

On 8 March 1944, two Air Force aircraft from nearby Barksdale Air Force Base collided overhead killing seven people.

== Geography ==
DeQuincy is located in northern Calcasieu Parish. Louisiana Highways 12 and 27 pass through the center of town: LA 12 leads east 36 miles (58 km) to Kinder and southwest 22 miles (35 km) to Deweyville, Texas, while LA 27 leads north 31 miles (50 km) to DeRidder and south 17 miles (27 km) to Sulphur, 9 miles (14 km) west of Lake Charles.

According to the United States Census Bureau, DeQuincy has a total area of 3.2 square miles (8.2 km^{2}), all land.

== Demographics ==
Historical population
| Census | Pop. | Note | %± |
|---|---|---|---|
| 1910 | 715 | | — |
| 1920 | 1,823 | | 155.0% |
| 1930 | 3,589 | | 96.9% |
| 1940 | 3,252 | | −9.4% |
| 1950 | 3,837 | | 18.0% |
| 1960 | 3,928 | | 2.4% |
| 1970 | 3,448 | | −12.2% |
| 1980 | 3,966 | | 15.0% |
| 1990 | 3,474 | | −12.4% |
| 2000 | 3,398 | | −2.2% |
| 2010 | 3,235 | | −4.8% |
| 2020 | 3,144 | | −2.8% |
| 2025 (est.) | 2,878 | ▼ | −8.5% |
U.S. Decennial Census

DeQuincy racial composition as of 2020
| Race | Number | Percentage |
|---|---|---|
| White (non-Hispanic) | 2,368 | 75.32% |
| Black or African American (non-Hispanic) | 544 | 17.3% |
| Native American | 26 | 0.83% |
| Asian | 8 | 0.25% |
| Pacific Islander | 1 | 0.03% |
| Other/Mixed | 119 | 3.78% |
| Hispanic or Latino | 78 | 2.48% |

As of the 2020 United States census, there were 3,144 people, 972 households, and 720 families residing in the city.

== Economy ==
DeQuincy was founded as a railroad settlement, and the Kansas City Southern and Union Pacific railroads remain principal employers for area citizens.

The timber industry has long been a vital part of the local economy. DeQuincy is home to Temple-Inland's Southwest Louisiana Lumber Operation.

The DeQuincy Industrial Airpark houses facilities for Thermoplastic Services, Recycle Inc., United Oilfield Services, and Paragon Plastic Sheet. In 2002, Calgon Carbon Corporation planned to construct a carbon reactivation plant in the airpark, though those plans have been delayed due to environmental concerns.

== Government and infrastructure ==
The former Grand Avenue High School was the site of the highest scoring boys high school basketball game on January 29, 1964, when Grand Avenue beat Cameron, Louisiana's Audrey Memorial High School by a score of 211 to 29.

The United States Postal Service operates the DeQuincy Post Office.

The Louisiana Department of Public Safety & Corrections formerly operated the C. Paul Phelps Correctional Center in unincorporated Beauregard Parish, about 3 miles (5 km) north of DeQuincy. The facility closed in November 2012

== Education ==
Calcasieu Parish Public Schools operates public schools:

- DeQuincy High School
- DeQuincy Middle School
- DeQuincy Elementary School
- DeQuincy Primary School

== Subject of multiple hoaxes ==
The town has been the subject of numerous hoaxes by satirical writer Paul Horner, widely spread on the Internet. The hoaxes claim the town enacted bizarre legislation such as banning those of Korean descent, issuing handguns to school children, permitting bigamy, banning twerking, and the city being completely eradicated by zombies on bath salts.

DeQuincy Mayor Lawrence Henagan, a Democrat, was falsely targeted in 2016 by an Internet hoax that he had jailed a volunteer fire chief for thirty days and then dismissed the man after the chief had prayed at the scene of a fire. The story identified the mayor as "Lawana Jones, an African-American atheist" and the fire chief as "39-year-old Ronnie Edwards." Henagan, the chairman of the deacon board at the First Baptist Church of DeQuincy, said that the chief is free to pray while firefighting. Henagan said he would join the fire chief in prayer. Henagan said that he has no knowledge why he was singled out for a fake news article but noted that he could take no legal action because the reports used fictitious names.

== Notable people ==
- Scott Brown, retired major league baseball pitcher.
- Burl Cain, warden of Louisiana State Penitentiary since 1995, formerly resided in DeQuincy.
- Johnny Dowers, actor and musician who has appeared on the TV series GCB and Charmed.
- Tina Girouard, award-winning video and performance artist, was born in DeQuincy.
- Hanna Nicole and Ashley Grance from the American duo Ha*Ash, singers
- Smiley Lewis, rhythm and blues musician whose songs have been covered by many artists
- Anthony Pullard, NBA player for the Milwaukee Bucks.
