= Vinton, Louisiana =

- Town
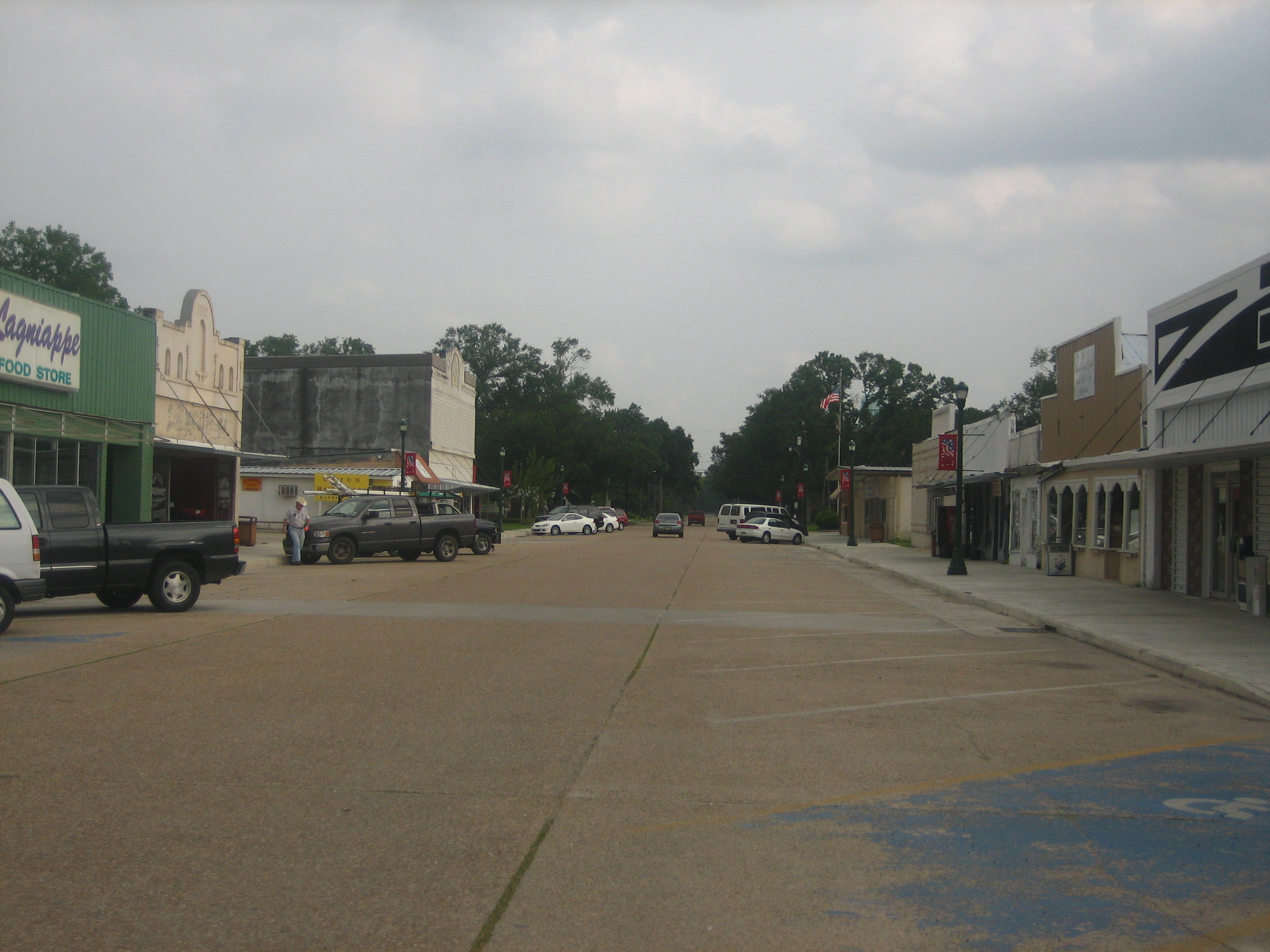
- Downtown Vinton
- Motto: Louisiana's Gateway to Cajun Country
- Location of Vinton in Calcasieu Parish, Louisiana.

- Location of Louisiana in the United States
- Coordinates: 30°11′45″N 93°34′54″W
- Country: United States
- State: Louisiana
- Parish: Calcasieu

Area
  - Total: 5.15 sq mi (13.33 km^{2})
  - Land: 5.10 sq mi (13.22 km^{2})
  - Water: 0.046 sq mi (0.12 km^{2})
- Elevation: 13 ft (4.0 m)

Population (2020)
  - Total: 3,400
  - Density: 666.2/sq mi (257.24/km^{2})
- Time zone: UTC-6 (CST)
  - Summer (DST): UTC-5 (CDT)
- ZIP code: 70668
- Area code: 337
- FIPS code: 22-78820
- GNIS feature ID: 2406803
- Website: www.cityofvinton.com

Vinton is a town in Calcasieu Parish, Louisiana, United States. The population was 3,400 in 2020. It is part of the Lake Charles metropolitan statistical area.

== History ==
The Old Spanish Trail wandered north and south of what is now U.S. Highway 90, in large part because of the unstable roadbed. The chief means of outside travel in the parish relied on riverboats plying the Sabine and Calcasieu rivers. Much of the marsh and bayous remained impassable. River travel made Lake Charles possible, just as mining for sulfur led to the founding of Sulphur. Settlers had long been in the Vinton area.

Jean Baptise Granger settled acreage between what is now Vinton and Big Woods about 1827, one of the first pioneers of the area. Even so, the area remained sparsely populated.

The area had few settlers because France, New Spain, and Mexico disputed the western boundary of Louisiana for many years. When the United States made the Louisiana Purchase, the disputed area was inherited. Spanish Lt. Col. Simón de Herrera and U.S. General James Wilkinson signed an agreement designating the area as neutral ground, also known as the Neutral Strip. The agreement was not a treaty and not ratified by either government, but it was respected by both countries. The area, sometimes referred to as the Rio Hondo Territory, was off limits to the military of both countries, and settlers were not to be allowed, but that did not stop squatters from both countries.

There had been numerous attempts to improve transportation throughout the 19th century. In the 1830s, on the nearby Sabine River, Dr. Robert Neblett developed a bluff into a thriving river port, which became known as Niblett's Bluff (sic) 6 miles (10 km) west of the present-day town. Confederate soldiers in 1863 cut a military road extending from Niblett's Bluff on the Sabine River to Alexandria. Although the road never developed into a major artery, during the American Civil War, Niblett's Bluff became Fort Niblett, which assisted the Confederate success in the Battle of Mansfield. Fort Niblett continues to be commemorated as part of Niblett's Bluff Park.

The parish and Vinton itself might have remained an undeveloped rural backwater without two signal events. The first, which had the greatest material impact on the entire community, was the effort by Charles Morgan's railroad companies to construct a railroad from Morgan City, Louisiana, to Orange, Texas — filling a gap that would enable direct rail travel between New Orleans and Houston. The stretch that included Vinton, the Louisiana Western Railroad, opened for traffic on August 30, 1880. The second and most important for Vinton was the arrival of a physician and former professor from Indiana and Iowa, Dr. Seaman A. Knapp. The economy of the town was further diversified and strengthened by the discovery of petroleum at Ged Lake.

=== Logging trains ===
The coming of the railroad enabled the growth of a logging industry. The part of Louisiana that included Calcasieu Parish was home to the finest longleaf pine in the world. When combined with the stands of cypress and other hardwood lumber, logging was a lucrative prospect. The railroad gave life to Vinton, starting with a switching track. Although there would be a depot later, Vinton began as a whistle stop called Blair. The source of the name is unknown. Some have speculated that the railroad siding took its name from a local family. However, no family named Blair was in residence in the area at that time.

=== Agriculture ===
Knapp completed the founding of Vinton. Precisely what brought him to Louisiana is unclear, but he certainly had a keen interest in agriculture, especially the improvement of farming methods. Formerly the president of the Iowa Agricultural College in Ames (now Iowa State University, Knapp arrived in Lake Charles in 1884 and went to work running an agricultural business for land developer Jabez B. Watkins. In 1887, he quit his job with Watkins and opened his own land company (some sources claim that Knapp started his company in 1885, but the evidence is inconclusive).

Watkins was a native of Lawrence, Kansas, who came to Lake Charles in 1883. Using English capital, Watkins bought 500,000 acres (2,000 km^{2}) of prairie and marshland in southwest Louisiana. To bring in settlers, he advertised in newspapers across the nation. It is assumed that Knapp was one of the settlers that Watkins attracted to the area. It is also assumed that Knapp was the leading force behind the first settler in what would become the township of Vinton.

Knapp purchased from the US government the 160-acre (0.65 km^{2}) tract of land that would form the basis of the town. At the time, he paid $2.50 an acre. On October 17, 1887, Robert F. Evans, also an Iowa native, purchased an additional 640 acres (2.6 km^{2}). The sources are unclear if the acreage was then sold to Knapp or to George Horridge. The records nonetheless show that the Southern Real Estate and Guaranty Company had bought all the land tracts by April 1889. The land was divided into lots and sold at prices ranging between $10 and $25 each. In time, 30 blocks extended the original 12-block plot of land. When the post office was registered with the US Postmaster General, Vinton, Knapp's Iowa hometown, was chosen as the name of the settlement, but when the Postmaster designated the name, he left no explanation for his choice so there is some doubt about the origin of the name. In a 2013 article on the town, the Advocate asserted that Knapp indeed named Vinton, Louisiana, "after his hometown of Vinton, Iowa."

It is possible that Knapp was responsible for the large influx of settlers from Vinton, Iowa. The Horridge, Stevenson, Eddie, Ferguson, Stockwell, Morgan, Nelson, Fairchild, Banker, Hall, and Haskill families were Iowa transplants. Some streets still bear the name of those families. Shortly after construction of the first homes came a sawmill, the Methodist Church, and the first public school building. In 1890, Mrs. Mabel K. Kelly became the first teacher in Vinton. A larger school replaced the older structure in 1901.

=== Petroleum ===
Between the initial founding of the settlement and its incorporation is an extraordinary event. The winter of 1895 brought a surprise. On February 14–15, the edge of the worst blizzard in American history touched southwestern Louisiana. A record 22 inches (56 cm) of snow fell on Lake Charles. Some areas reported snowfall between 18 and 24 inches (460 and 610 mm). In Vinton, the blizzard crippled the new sheep industry, and the farmers salvaged what they could by shaving wool from the dead flocks.

Despite the setback caused by the storm, the town grew steadily, aided by the oil boom following the discovery of petroleum reserves at Ged Lake, about 5 miles (8 km) south of Vinton, along Ged Road.

== Geography ==
Vinton is located in western Calcasieu Parish. U.S. Route 90 passes through the center of town, and Interstate 10 runs along the southern edge, with access from exits 7 and 8. Sulphur, Louisiana, is 13 miles (21 km) to the east, and Orange, Texas, is the same distance to the west.

According to the United States Census Bureau, Vinton has a total area of 5.05 square miles (13.07 km^{2}), of which 5.00 square miles (12.94 km^{2}) is land and 0.05 square miles (0.13 km^{2}), or 1.01%, is water.

== Demographics ==
Historical population
Census	Pop.	Note	%±
1920	1,441		—
1930	1,989		38.0%
1940	1,787		−10.2%
1950	2,597		45.3%
1960	2,987		15.0%
1970	3,454		15.6%
1980	3,631		5.1%
1990	3,154		−13.1%
2000	3,338		5.8%
2010	3,212		−3.8%
2020	3,400		5.9%
2025 (est.)	3,115	▼	−8.4%
U.S. Decennial Census

=== 2020 census ===
As of the 2020 census, Vinton had a population of 3,400. The median age was 35.4 years. 27.7% of residents were under the age of 18 and 15.2% of residents were 65 years of age or older. For every 100 females there were 90.8 males, and for every 100 females age 18 and over there were 87.5 males age 18 and over.

0.0% of residents lived in urban areas, while 100.0% lived in rural areas.

There were 1,328 households in Vinton, of which 35.5% had children under the age of 18 living in them. Of all households, 36.4% were married-couple households, 19.2% were households with a male householder and no spouse or partner present, and 35.8% were households with a female householder and no spouse or partner present. About 29.8% of all households were made up of individuals and 12.8% had someone living alone who was 65 years of age or older.

There were 1,444 housing units, of which 8.0% were vacant. The homeowner vacancy rate was 2.5% and the rental vacancy rate was 4.3%.

Vinton racial composition as of 2020
Race	Number	Percentage
White (non-Hispanic)	2,233	65.68%
Black or African American (non-Hispanic)	664	19.53%
Native American	28	0.82%
Asian	26	0.76%
Other/Mixed	164	4.82%
Hispanic or Latino	285	8.38%

== Education ==
The Vinton High School serves students both in Vinton and surrounding areas. It is part of the Calcasieu Parish Public Schools.

== Notable people ==
- Ken Bahnsen, NFL running back and member of the North Texas Athletic Hall of Fame
- Marcia Ball, singer/songwriter
- Clarence "Gatemouth" Brown (1924–2005), blues musician
- Mike Danahay, state representative for Calcasieu Parish since 2008
- Russell Hantz, reality television star, raised in Vinton
- Bobby Kimball, lead singer of the legendary 70s and 80s band Toto
- Seaman A. Knapp (1833–1911), formative influence in USDA's Cooperative Extension System
- Theodore "Ted" Lyons (1900–1986), Major League Baseball hall of famer
