= Starks, Louisiana =

- Census-designated place
- Location within Louisiana
- Coordinates: 30°18′38″N 93°40′00″W
- Country: United States
- State: Louisiana
- Parish: Calcasieu

Area
  - Total: 3.43 sq mi (8.88 km^{2})
  - Land: 3.43 sq mi (8.88 km^{2})
  - Water: 0 sq mi (0.00 km^{2})
- Elevation: 23 ft (7.0 m)

Population (2020)
  - Total: 659
  - Density: 192/sq mi (74.2/km^{2})
- Time zone: UTC-6 (CST)
  - Summer (DST): UTC-5 (CST)
- ZIP Code: 70661
- Area Code: 337
- FIPS code: 22-72975
- GNIS feature ID: 2586712

Starks is an unincorporated community and census-designated place (CDP) in Calcasieu Parish, Louisiana, United States. As of the 2020 census, Starks had a population of 659. It is located approximately 30 miles (48 km) northwest of Lake Charles and about 5 miles (8 km) from the Texas and Louisiana border. Starks is known for its annual Mayhaw Festival to celebrate the fruit that grows in the bayous along the Texas/Louisiana border.

== Demographics ==
Historical population
| Census | Pop. | Note | %± |
|---|---|---|---|
| 2010 | 664 | | — |
| 2020 | 659 | | −0.8% |
U.S. Decennial Census

Starks was first listed as a census designated place in the 2010 U.S. census.

Starks racial composition as of 2020
| Race | Number | Percentage |
|---|---|---|
| White (non-Hispanic) | 602 | 91.35% |
| Black or African American (non-Hispanic) | 25 | 3.79% |
| Native American | 4 | 0.61% |
| Other/mixed | 25 | 3.79% |
| Hispanic or Latino | 3 | 0.46% |

As of the 2020 United States census, there were 659 people, 166 households, and 84 families residing in the CDP.
