= Deweyville, Texas =

- CDP
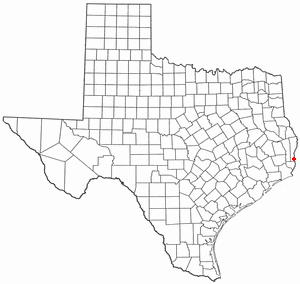
- Location of Deweyville, Texas

- Coordinates: 30°17′47″N 93°44′58″W
- Country: United States
- State: Texas
- County: Newton

Area
  - Total: 11.3 sq mi (29.3 km^{2})
  - Land: 11.2 sq mi (29.1 km^{2})
  - Water: 0.077 sq mi (0.2 km^{2})
- Elevation: 16 ft (4.9 m)

Population (2020)
  - Total: 571
  - Density: 50.8/sq mi (19.6/km^{2})
- Time zone: UTC-6 (Central (CST))
  - Summer (DST): UTC-5 (CDT)
- ZIP code: 77614
- Area code: 409
- FIPS code: 48-20212
- GNIS feature ID: 2408667

Deweyville is a census-designated place (CDP) in Newton County, on the central eastern border of Texas, United States. The population was 571 according to the 2020 census, having gone down from 1,023 since the 2010 census.

== Historical development ==
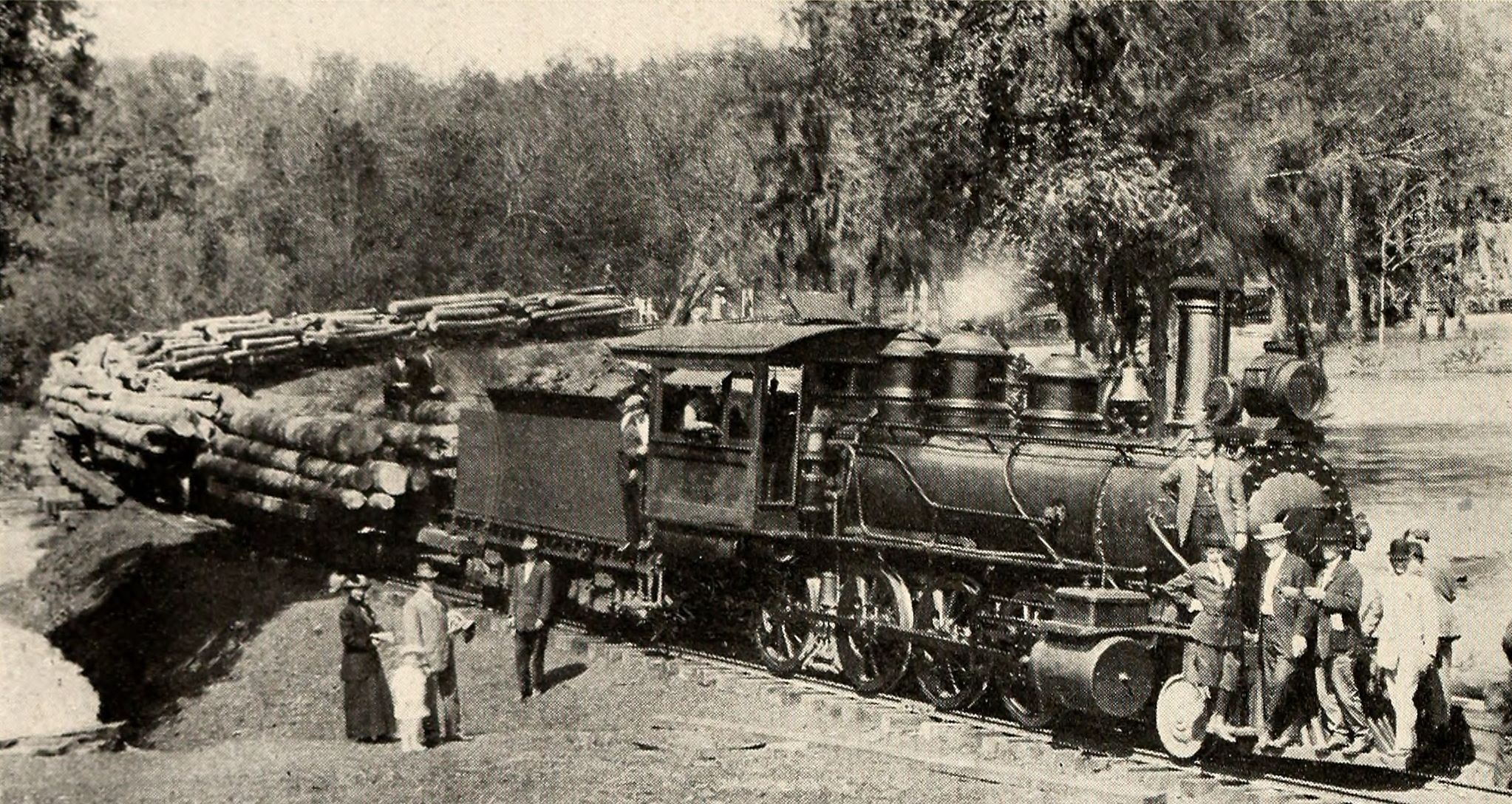
Logging train at Deweyville Plant of Sabine Tram Company

This settlement was established in 1898 as a sawmill site by the Sabine Tram Company, which had a logging operation. It was named after George Dewey, an admiral in the United States Navy who was victorious in the Battle of Manila Bay in the Spanish–American War in the Philippines that same year. Within two years a post office would be established. For a short time this town was the largest in Newton County. Electricity was installed for the residents of Deweyville in the 1920s.

The original settlement was called "Possum Bluff". It was purchased by Pierre Lavine from Bill Morrison, for a team of oxen in 1886. A Texas Historical Marker was erected in 1967 on Highway 12 near the Texas / Louisiana border stating this information. The marker was later moved to the front of the Deweyville Public Library.

== Geography ==
According to the United States Census Bureau, the CDP has a total area of 11.3 square miles (29 km^{2}), of which 11.2 square miles (29 km^{2}) is land and 0.1 square miles (0.26 km^{2}) (0.71%) is water. It is located along the Sabine River.

=== Climate ===
The climate in this area is characterized by hot, humid summers and generally mild to cool winters. According to the Köppen Climate Classification system, Deweyville has a humid subtropical climate, abbreviated "Cfa" on climate maps.

== Demographics ==
Historical population
Census	Pop.	Note	%±
1980	1,171		—
1990	1,218		4.0%
2000	1,190		−2.3%
2010	1,023		−14.0%
2020	571		−44.2%
U.S. Decennial Census; 1850–1900 1910; 1920 1930 1940; 1950 1960 1970; 1980 1990 2000; 2010

Deweyville first appeared as a census designated place in the 1980 United States census.

=== 2020 census ===
Deweyville CDP, Texas – Racial and ethnic composition Note: the US Census treats Hispanic/Latino as an ethnic category. This table excludes Latinos from the racial categories and assigns them to a separate category. Hispanics/Latinos may be of any race.
Race / Ethnicity (NH = Non-Hispanic)	Pop 2000	Pop 2010	Pop 2020	% 2000	% 2010	% 2020
White alone (NH)	1,164	951	523	97.82%	92.96%	91.59%
Black or African American alone (NH)	0	11	11	0.00%	1.08%	1.93%
Native American or Alaska Native alone (NH)	5	15	7	0.42%	1.47%	1.23%
Asian alone (NH)	2	2	2	0.17%	0.20%	0.35%
Native Hawaiian or Pacific Islander alone (NH)	0	0	0	0.00%	0.00%	0.00%
Other race alone (NH)	0	0	0	0.00%	0.00%	0.00%
Mixed race or Multiracial (NH)	9	26	13	0.76%	2.54%	2.28%
Hispanic or Latino (any race)	10	18	15	0.84%	1.76%	2.63%
Total	1,190	1,023	571	100.00%	100.00%	100.00%

As of the 2020 United States census, there were 571 people, 253 households, and 201 families residing in the CDP.

As of the census of 2000, there were 1,190 people, 459 households, and 325 families residing in the CDP. The population density was 105.9 inhabitants per square mile (40.9/km^{2}). There were 528 housing units at an average density of 47.0 per square mile (18.1/km^{2}). The racial makeup of the CDP was 98.40% White, 0.42% Native American, 0.17% Asian, 0.17% from other races, and 0.84% from two or more races. Hispanic or Latino of any race were 0.84% of the population.

There were 459 households, out of which 32.0% had children under the age of 18 living with them, 59.3% were married couples living together, 7.4% had a female householder with no husband present, and 29.0% were non-families. 24.4% of all households were made up of individuals, and 10.2% had someone living alone who was 65 years of age or older. The average household size was 2.59 and the average family size was 3.11.

In the CDP, the population was spread out, with 26.2% under the age of 18, 8.8% from 18 to 24, 28.7% from 25 to 44, 25.1% from 45 to 64, and 11.1% who were 65 years of age or older. The median age was 35 years. For every 100 females, there were 101.0 males. For every 100 females age 18 and over, there were 95.5 males.

The median income for a household in the CDP was $30,714, and the median income for a family was $35,150. Males had a median income of $35,250 versus $15,852 for females. The per capita income for the CDP was $13,136. About 13.5% of families and 17.8% of the population were below the poverty line, including 25.2% of those under age 18 and 7.4% of those age 65 or over.

== 2016 flooding ==
Over 5000 homes were flooded in Deweyville and the surrounding area, to include parts of Louisiana along the Sabine River, during the month of March 2016. The flooding was caused by torrential rains and the release of water from the Toledo Bend Reservoir.
