= 1997 Arizona Cardinals season =

NFL team season

- Owner: Bill Bidwill
- Head coach: Vince Tobin
- Offensive coordinator: Dick Jamieson
- Defensive coordinator: Dave McGinnis
- Home stadium: Sun Devil Stadium

Results
- Record: 4–12
- Division place: 5th NFC East
- Playoffs: Did not qualify
- Pro Bowlers: WR Rob Moore; CB Aeneas Williams

The 1997 Arizona Cardinals season was the franchise's 99th season, 78th season in the National Football League and the 10th in Arizona. The team was unable to match their previous output of 7–9, instead winning only four games. The Cardinals failed to qualify to the playoffs for the fifteenth consecutive season.

In week 2, the Cardinals ended a 13-game losing streak to the Dallas Cowboys.

== Offseason ==
=== NFL draft ===
1997 Arizona Cardinals draft
Round	Pick	Player	Position	College	Notes
1	9	Tom Knight	Cornerback	Iowa	
2	42	Jake Plummer *	Quarterback	Arizona State	
3	84	Ty Howard	Cornerback	Ohio State	
4	107	Chris Dishman	Guard	Nebraska	
Made roster * Made at least one Pro Bowl during career

=== Undrafted free agents ===
1997 Undrafted free agents of note
Player	Position	College
Michael Comer	Linebacker	UTEP

== Personnel ==
1997 Arizona Cardinals staff
Front office: President – Bill Bidwill; Vice president – Larry Wilson; Vice president and general counsel – Michael Bidwill; Vice president of player personnel – Bob Ferguson; Assistant to the president – Rod Graves; Head coaches: Head coach – Vince Tobin; Offensive coaches: Offensive coordinator – Dick Jamieson; Running backs – Johnny Roland; Wide receivers – Vic Rapp; Tight ends/quality control – Geep Chryst; Offensive line – Carl Mauck	Defensive coaches: Defensive coordinator – Dave McGinnis; Defensive line – Joe Greene; Linebackers – Glenn Pires; Defensive backs – Larry Marmie; Special teams coaches: Special teams – Al Everest; Strength and conditioning: Strength and conditioning – Bob Rogucki

== Roster ==
1997 Arizona Cardinals roster
Quarterbacks (QB): 15 Stoney Case; 11 Kent Graham; 16 Jake Plummer; Running backs (RB): 37 Larry Centers FB; 32 LeShon Johnson; 30 Leeland McElroy; 20 Ronald Moore; 45 Cedric Smith FB; Wide receivers (WR): 89 Fred Brock; 83 Anthony Edwards; 85 Rob Moore; 81 Frank Sanders; 82 Kevin Williams; Tight ends (TE): 80 Pat Carter; 84 Chris Gedney; 87 Johnny McWilliams	Offensive linemen (OL): 75 Lomas Brown T; 72 Jerome Daniels G/T; 62 Mike Devlin C; 64 James Dexter T; 67 Chris Dishman G; 54 Aaron Graham C; 71 Thomas Guynes T; 73 Matt Joyce G; 60 Anthony Redmon G; 74 Rob Selby G; Defensive linemen (DL): 63 Michael Bankston DE; 90 Mark Campbell DT; 96 Brad Ottis DE; 97 Simeon Rice DE; 93 Mark Smith DT; 91 Rashod Swinger DT; 94 Bernard Wilson DT	Linebackers (LB): 52 Mike Caldwell OLB; 58 Eric Hill MLB; 56 Terry Irving OLB; 51 Lyron Cobbins MLB; 50 Tony McCombs OLB; 57 Ronald McKinnon; 95 Jamir Miller OLB; Defensive backs (DB): 46 Brent Alexander FS; 28 Tommy Bennett SS; 43 Matt Darby SS; 38 Kenny Harris SS; 29 Ty Howard CB; 22 Tom Knight CB; 42 Kwamie Lassiter FS; 44 J. J. McCleskey CB; 35 Aeneas Williams CB; Special teams (ST): 10 Jeff Feagles P; 6 Joe Nedney K; 86 Trey Junkin LS	Practice squad: 31 Rod Brown FB; 12 Chad Carpenter WR; 69 Allen DeGraffenreid T; Reserve: 76 Jerry Drake DT (IR); 66 Eric Jonassen G/T (IR); 24 Dell McGee CB (IR); 31 Derrick Moore RB (IR); 98 Eric Swann DT (IR); 68 Joe Wolf T (IR); Rookies in italics 52 active, 6 reserve, 3 practice squad

== Regular season ==
=== Schedule ===
Week	Date	Opponent	Result	Record	Venue	Attendance
1	August 31	at Cincinnati Bengals	**L** 21–24	0–1	Cinergy Field	53,644
2	September 7	**Dallas Cowboys**	**W** 25–22 (OT)	1–1	Sun Devil Stadium	71,578
3	September 14	at **Washington Redskins**	**L** 13–19 (OT)	1–2	Jack Kent Cooke Stadium	78,270
4	Bye					
5	September 28	at Tampa Bay Buccaneers	**L** 18–19	1–3	Houlihan's Stadium	53,804
6	October 5	Minnesota Vikings	**L** 19–20	1–4	Sun Devil Stadium	45,550
7	October 12	**New York Giants**	**L** 13–27	1–5	Sun Devil Stadium	38,959
8	October 19	at **Philadelphia Eagles**	**L** 10–13 (OT)	1–6	Veterans Stadium	66,860
9	October 26	Tennessee Oilers	**L** 14–41	1–7	Sun Devil Stadium	44,030
10	November 2	**Philadelphia Eagles**	**W** 31–21	2–7	Sun Devil Stadium	39,549
11	November 9	at **Dallas Cowboys**	**L** 6–24	2–8	Texas Stadium	64,302
12	November 16	at **New York Giants**	**L** 10–19	2–9	Giants Stadium	68,316
13	November 23	at Baltimore Ravens	**W** 16–13	3–9	Memorial Stadium	53,976
14	November 30	Pittsburgh Steelers	**L** 20–26 (OT)	3–10	Sun Devil Stadium	66,341
15	December 7	**Washington Redskins**	**L** 28–38	3–11	Sun Devil Stadium	41,537
16	December 14	at New Orleans Saints	**L** 10–27	3–12	Louisiana Superdome	45,517
17	December 21	Atlanta Falcons	**W** 29–26	4–12	Sun Devil Stadium	32,003
Note: Intra-division opponents are in **bold** text.

=== Game summaries ===
==== Week 1: at Cincinnati Bengals ====
Week 1: Arizona Cardinals at Cincinnati Bengals – Game summary

Quarter	1	2	3	4	Total
Cardinals	7	7	7	0	**21**
**Bengals**	0	3	0	21	**24**

at Cinergy Field, Cincinnati, Ohio

- Date: August 31
- Game time: 1:00 p.m. EST/11:00 a.m. MST
- Game weather: 71 °F (22 °C)
- Game attendance: 53,644
- Box Score

Game information

**First quarter**

- ARI – Leeland McElroy 17-yard run (Kevin Butler kick). Cardinals 7–0.

**Second quarter**

- CIN – Doug Pelfrey 38-yard field goal. Cardinals 7–3.
- ARI – Cedric Smith 1-yard run (Kevin Butler kick). Cardinals 14–3.

**Third quarter**

- ARI – Larry Centers 1-yard run (Kevin Butler kick). Cardinals 21–3.

**Fourth quarter**

- CIN – Ki-Jana Carter 2-yard run (Doug Pelfrey kick). Cardinals 21–10.
- CIN – Ki-Jana Carter 1-yard run (Doug Pelfrey kick). Cardinals 21–17.
- CIN – Carl Pickens 7-yard pass from Jeff Blake (Doug Pelfrey kick). Bengals 24–21.

**Top passers**

- ARI – Kent Graham – 20/36, 248 yards, INT
- CIN – Jeff Blake – 24/35, 252 yards, TD, INT

**Top rushers**

- ARI – Leeland McElroy – 17 rushes, 52 yards, TD
- CIN – Ki-Jana Carter – 19 rushes, 76 yards, 2 TD

**Top receivers**

- ARI – Frank Sanders – 6 receptions, 105 yards
- CIN – Carl Pickens – 8 receptions, 79 yards, TD

==== Week 2: vs. Dallas Cowboys ====
Week 2: Dallas Cowboys at Arizona Cardinals – Game summary

Quarter	1	2	3	4	OT	Total
Cowboys	6	13	3	0	0	**22**
**Cardinals**	0	7	7	8	3	**25**

at Sun Devil Stadium, Tempe, Arizona

- Date: September 7
- Game time: 6:00 p.m. MST
- Game weather: 89 °F (32 °C)
- Game attendance: 71,578
- Box Score

Game information

**First quarter**

- DAL – Richie Cunningham 24-yard field goal. Cowboys 3–0.
- DAL – Richie Cunningham 47-yard field goal. Cowboys 6–0.

**Second quarter**

- ARI – Leeland McElroy 10-yard run (Kevin Butler kick). Cardinals 7–6.
- DAL – Richie Cunningham 37-yard field goal. Cowboys 9–7.
- DAL – Chad Hennings 4-yard fumble return (Richie Cunningham kick). Cowboys 16–7.
- DAL – Richie Cunningham 34-yard field goal. Cowboys 19–7.

**Third quarter**

- DAL – Richie Cunningham 28-yard field goal. Cowboys 22–7.
- ARI – Frank Sanders 7-yard pass from Kent Graham (Kevin Butler kick). Cowboys 22–14.

**Fourth quarter**

- ARI – Pat Carter 1-yard pass from Kent Graham (Kent Graham-Rob Moore pass). Tied 22–22.

**Overtime**

- ARI – Kevin Butler 20-yard field goal. Cardinals 25–22.

**Top passers**

- DAL – Troy Aikman – 21/40, 171 yards
- ARI – Kent Graham – 26/47, 249 yards, 2 TD

**Top rushers**

- DAL – Emmitt Smith – 19 rushes, 132 yards
- ARI – Leeland McElroy – 16 rushes, 53 yards, TD

**Top receivers**

- DAL – Eric Bjornson – 3 receptions, 59 yards
- ARI – Rob Moore – 6 receptions, 108 yards

==== Week 3: at Washington Redskins ====
Week 3: Arizona Cardinals at Washington Redskins – Game summary

Quarter	1	2	3	4	OT	Total
Cardinals	7	0	3	3	0	**13**
**Redskins**	3	7	0	3	6	**19**

at Jack Kent Cooke Stadium, Landover, Maryland

- Date: September 14
- Game time: 1:00 p.m. EST/11:00 a.m. MST
- Game weather: 71 °F (22 °C)
- Game attendance: 78,270
- Box Score

Game information

**First quarter**

- WAS – Scott Blanton 20-yard field goal. Redskins 3–0.
- ARI – Tommy Bennett 0-yard blocked punt recovery. Cardinals 7–3.

**Second quarter**

- WAS – Michael Westbrook 5-yard pass from Gus Frerotte (Scott Blanton kick). Redskins 10–7.'

**Third quarter**

- ARI – Kevin Butler 32-yard field goal. Tied 10–10.

**Fourth quarter**

- WAS – Scott Blanton 19-yard field goal. Redskins 13–10.
- ARI – Kevin Butler 47-yard field goal. Tied 13–13.

**Overtime**

- WAS – Michael Westbrook 40-yard pass from Gus Frerotte. Redskins 19–13.

**Top passers**

- ARI – Kent Graham – 17/40, 132 yards
- WAS – Gus Frerotte – 19/36, 265 yards, 2 TD, INT

**Top rushers**

- ARI – Leeland McElroy – 18 rushes, 49 yards
- WAS – Terry Allen – 25 rushes, 56 yards

**Top receivers**

- ARI – Larry Centers – 6 receptions, 42 yards
- WAS – Leslie Shepherd – 4 receptions, 67 yards

==== Week 5: at Tampa Bay Buccaneers ====
Week 5: Arizona Cardinals at Tampa Bay Buccaneers – Game summary

Quarter	1	2	3	4	Total
Cardinals	0	7	11	0	**18**
**Buccaneers**	6	6	0	7	**19**

at Houlihan's Stadium, Tampa, Florida

- Date: September 28
- Game time: 1:00 p.m. EST/11:00 a.m. MST
- Game weather: 81 °F (27 °C)
- Game attendance: 53,804
- Box Score

Game information

**First quarter**

- TB – Alshermond Singleton 28-yard blocked punt return (kick failed). Buccaneers 6–0.

**Second quarter**

- TB – Reidel Anthony 8-yard pass from Trent Dilfer (run failed). Buccaneers 12–0.
- ARI – Rob Moore 21-yard pass from Kent Graham (Kevin Butler kick). Buccaneers 12–7.

**Third quarter**

- ARI – Kevin Butler 37-yard field goal. Buccaneers 12–10.
- ARI – Aeneas Williams 42-yard interception return (Kent Graham–Frank Sanders pass). Cardinals 18–12.

**Fourth quarter**

- TB – Karl Williams 31-yard pass from Trent Dilfer (Michael Husted kick). Buccaneers 19–18.

**Top passers**

- ARI – Kent Graham – 31/52, 339 yards, TD, 2 INT
- TB – Trent Dilfer – 12/24, 110 yards, 2 TD, INT

**Top rushers**

- ARI – Leeland McElroy – 13 rushes, 40 yards
- TB – Warrick Dunn – 10 rushes, 27 yards

**Top receivers**

- ARI – Rob Moore – 8 receptions, 147 yards, TD
- TB – Reidel Anthony – 5 receptions, 49 yards, TD

==== Week 6: vs. Minnesota Vikings ====
Week 6: Minnesota Vikings at Arizona Cardinals – Game summary

Quarter	1	2	3	4	Total
**Vikings**	7	3	0	10	**20**
Cardinals	3	10	3	3	**19**

at Sun Devil Stadium, Tempe, Arizona

- Date: October 5
- Game time: 2:00 p.m. MST
- Game weather: 86 °F (30 °C)
- Game attendance: 45,550
- Box Score

Game information

**First quarter**

- MIN – Andrew Glover 18-yard pass from Brad Johnson (Eddie Murray kick). Vikings 7–0.
- ARI – Kevin Butler 23-yard field goal. Vikings 7–3.

**Second quarter**

- MIN – Eddie Murray 49-yard field goal. Vikings 10–3.
- ARI – Chris Gedney 33-yard pass from Kent Graham (Kevin Butler kick). Tied 10–10.
- ARI – Kevin Butler 23-yard field goal. Cardinals 13–10.

**Third quarter**

- ARI – Kevin Butler 28-yard field goal. Cardinals 16–10.

**Fourth quarter**

- ARI – Kevin Butler 49-yard field goal. Cardinals 19–10.
- MIN – Cris Carter 1-yard pass from Brad Johnson (Eddie Murray kick). Cardinals 19–17.
- MIN – Eddie Murray 38-yard field goal. Vikings 20–19.

**Top passers**

- MIN – Brad Johnson – 25/39, 292 yards, 2 TD, 2 INT
- ARI – Kent Graham – 22/38, 293 yards, TD

**Top rushers**

- MIN – Robert Smith – 17 rushes, 60 yards
- ARI – Leeland McElroy – 15 rushes, 87 yards

**Top receivers**

- MIN – Andrew Glover – 6 receptions, 86 yards, TD
- ARI – Rob Moore – 8 receptions, 108 yards

==== Week 7: vs. New York Giants ====
Week 7: New York Giants at Arizona Cardinals – Game summary

Quarter	1	2	3	4	Total
**Giants**	3	3	7	14	**27**
Cardinals	0	6	0	7	**13**

at Sun Devil Stadium, Tempe, Arizona

- Date: October 12
- Game time: 2:00 p.m. MST
- Game weather: 64 °F (18 °C)
- Game attendance: 38,959
- Box Score

Game information

**First quarter**

- NYG – Brad Daluiso 31-yard field goal. Giants 3–0.

**Second quarter**

- NYG – Brad Daluiso 48-yard field goal. Giants 6–0.
- ARI – Aeneas Williams 30-yard interception return (kick failed). Tied 6–6.

**Third quarter**

- NYG – David Patten 18-yard pass from Danny Kanell (Brad Daluiso kick). Giants 13–6.

**Fourth quarter**

- NYG – Tyrone Wheatley 8-yard run (Brad Daluiso kick). Giants 20–6.
- NYG – Erric Pegram 18-yard run (Brad Daluiso kick). Giants 27–6.
- ARI – Stoney Case 1-yard run (Kevin Butler kick). Giants 27–13.

**Top passers**

- NYG – Danny Kanell – 13/28, 198 yards, TD, INT
- ARI – Stoney Case – 18/33, 222 yards, 2 INT

**Top rushers**

- NYG – Tyrone Wheatley – 22 rushes, 103 yards, TD
- ARI – LeShon Johnson – 2 rushes, 14 yards

**Top receivers**

- NYG – David Patten – 3 receptions, 66 yards, TD
- ARI – Rob Moore – 4 receptions, 87 yards

==== Week 8: at Philadelphia Eagles ====
Week 8: Arizona Cardinals at Philadelphia Eagles – Game summary

Quarter	1	2	3	4	OT	Total
Cardinals	0	0	3	7	0	**10**
**Eagles**	0	7	0	3	3	**13**

at Veterans Stadium, Philadelphia, Pennsylvania

- Date: October 19
- Game time: 1:00 p.m. EST/11:00 a.m. MST
- Game weather: 55 °F (13 °C)
- Game attendance: 66,860
- Box Score

Game information

**First quarter** No scoring plays **Second quarter**

- PHI – Ricky Watters 2-yard run (Chris Boniol kick). Eagles 7–3.

**Third quarter**

- ARI – Joe Nedney 23-yard field goal. Eagles 7–3.

**Fourth quarter**

- ARI – Kevin Williams 31-yard pass from Jake Plummer (Joe Nedney kick). Cardinals 10–7.
- PHI – Chris Boniol 38-yard field goal. Tied 10–10.

**Overtime**

- PHI – Chris Boniol 24-yard field goal. Eagles 13–10.

**Top passers**

- ARI – Jake Plummer – 5/9, 98 yards, TD
- PHI – Rodney Peete – 23/36, 298 yards, 2 INT

**Top rushers**

- ARI – Larry Centers – 11 rushes, 37 yards
- PHI – Ricky Watters – 24 rushes, 83 yards, TD

**Top receivers**

- ARI – Rob Moore – 6 receptions, 101 yards
- PHI – Irving Fryar – 5 receptions, 85 yards

==== Week 9: vs. Tennessee Oilers ====
Week 9: Tennessee Oilers at Arizona Cardinals – Game summary

Quarter	1	2	3	4	Total
**Oilers**	3	14	17	7	**41**
Cardinals	0	0	7	7	**14**

at Sun Devil Stadium, Tempe, Arizona

- Date: October 26
- Game time: 2:00 p.m. MST
- Game weather: 62 °F (17 °C)
- Game attendance: 44,030
- Box Score

Game information

**First quarter**

- TEN – Al Del Greco 52-yard field goal. Oilers 3–0.

**Second quarter**

- TEN – Denard Walker 39-yard interception return (Al Del Greco kick). Oilers 10–0.
- TEN – Al Del Greco 42-yard field goal. Oilers 13–0.
- TEN – Steve McNair 35-yard run (Al Del Greco kick). Oilers 20–0.

**Third quarter**

- TEN – Steve McNair 2-yard run (Al Del Greco kick). Oilers 27–0.
- ARI – Rob Moore 12-yard pass from Jake Plummer (Joe Nedney kick). Oilers 27–7.
- TEN – Chris Sanders 55-yard pass from Steve McNair (Al Del Greco kick). Oilers 34–7.

**Fourth quarter**

- TEN – Chris Sanders 20-yard pass from Steve McNair (Al Del Greco kick). Oilers 41–7.
- ARI – Rob Moore 2-yard pass from Jake Plummer (Joe Nedney kick). Oilers 41–14.

**Top passers**

- TEN – Steve McNair – 9/17, 146 yards, 2 TD
- ARI – Jake Plummer – 21/40, 195 yards, 2 TD, 4 INT

**Top rushers**

- TEN – Eddie George – 17 rushes, 71 yards
- ARI – Larry Centers – 14 rushes, 57 yards

**Top receivers**

- TEN – Chris Sanders – 2 receptions, 75 yards, 2 TD
- ARI – Frank Sanders – 10 receptions, 98 yards

==== Week 10: vs. Philadelphia Eagles ====
Week 10: Philadelphia Eagles at Arizona Cardinals – Game summary

Quarter	1	2	3	4	Total
Eagles	7	0	14	0	**21**
**Cardinals**	7	3	7	14	**31**

at Sun Devil Stadium, Tempe, Arizona

- Date: November 2
- Game time: 2:00 p.m. MST
- Game weather: 73 °F (23 °C)
- Game attendance: 39,549
- Box Score

Game information

**First quarter**

- ARI – Bernard Wilson 66-yard interception return (Joe Nedney kick). Cardinals 7–0.
- PHI – Willie Clark 39-yard kickoff return (Chris Boniol kick). Tied 7–7.

**Second quarter**

- ARI – Joe Nedney 45-yard field goal. Cardinals 10–7.

**Third quarter**

- ARI – Rob Moore 31-yard pass from Jake Plummer (Joe Nedney kick). Cardinals 17–7.
- PHI – Mark Seay 19-yard pass from Ty Detmer (Chris Boniol kick). Cardinals 17–14.
- PHI – Freddie Solomon 18-yard pass from Ty Detmer (Chris Boniol kick). Eagles 21–17.

**Fourth quarter**

- ARI – Kent Graham 1-yard run (Joe Nedney kick). Cardinals 24–21.
- ARI – Kent Graham 1-yard run (Joe Nedney kick). Cardinals 31–21.

**Top passers**

- PHI – Ty Detmer – 15/27, 224 yards, 2 TD, 2 INT
- ARI – Jake Plummer – 7/18, 132 yards, TD, INT

**Top rushers**

- PHI – Ricky Watters – 21 rushes, 73 yards
- ARI – Leeland McElroy – 13 rushes, 67 yards

**Top receivers**

- PHI – Freddie Solomon – 4 receptions, 77 yards, TD
- ARI – Rob Moore – 3 receptions, 82 yards, TD

==== Week 11: at Dallas Cowboys ====
Week 11: Arizona Cardinals at Dallas Cowboys – Game summary

Quarter	1	2	3	4	Total
Cardinals	3	0	3	0	**6**
**Cowboys**	0	10	14	0	**24**

at Texas Stadium, Irving, Texas

- Date: November 9
- Game time: 12:00 p.m. CST/11:00 a.m. MST
- Game weather: 54 °F (12 °C)
- Game attendance: 64,302
- Box Score

Game information

**First quarter**

- ARI – Joe Nedney 42-yard field goal. Cardinals 3–0.

**Second quarter**

- DAL – Richie Cunningham 23-yard field goal. Tied 3–3.
- DAL – Herschel Walker 11-yard pass from Troy Aikman (Richie Cunningham kick). Cowboys 10–3.

**Third quarter**

- ARI – Joe Nedney 39-yard field goal. Cowboys 10–6.
- DAL – Sherman Williams 1-yard run (Richie Cunningham kick). Cowboys 17–6.
- DAL – Emmitt Smith 5-yard run (Richie Cunningham kick). Cowboys 24–6.

**Fourth quarter**

- No scoring plays

**Top passers**

- ARI – Jake Plummer – 13/22, 148 yards
- DAL – Troy Aikman – 15/22, 216 yards, TD, INT

**Top rushers**

- ARI – Jake Plummer – 7 rushes, 51 yards
- DAL – Emmitt Smith – 15 rushes, 64 yards, TD

**Top receivers**

- ARI – Rob Moore – 6 receptions, 95 yards
- DAL – Anthony Miller – 3 receptions, 77 yards

==== Week 12: at New York Giants ====
Week 12: Arizona Cardinals at New York Giants – Game summary

Quarter	1	2	3	4	Total
Cardinals	0	0	10	0	**10**
**Giants**	0	10	0	9	**19**

at Giants Stadium, East Rutherford, New Jersey

- Date: November 16
- Game time: 1:00 p.m. EST/11:00 a.m. MST
- Game weather: 38 °F (3 °C)
- Game attendance: 68,316
- Box Score

Game information

**First quarter**

- No scoring plays

**Second quarter**

- NYG – Brad Daluiso 33-yard field goal. Giants 3–0.
- NYG – Amani Toomer 56-yard pass from Danny Kanell (Brad Daluiso kick). Giants 10–0.

**Third quarter**

- ARI – Frank Sanders 70-yard pass from Jake Plummer (Joe Nedney kick). Giants 10–7.
- ARI – Joe Nedney 34-yard field goal. Tied 10–10.

**Fourth quarter**

- NYG – Howard Cross 1-yard pass from Danny Kanell (kick failed). Giants 16–10.
- NYG – Brad Daluiso 35-yard field goal. Giants 19–10.

**Top passers**

- ARI – Jake Plummer – 22/33, 388 yards, TD, 2 INT
- NYG – Danny Kanell – 14/21, 182 yards, 2 TD

**Top rushers**

- ARI – Larry Centers – 10 rushes, 34 yards
- NYG – Charles Way – 14 rushes, 114 yards

**Top receivers**

- ARI – Frank Sanders – 9 receptions, 188 yards, TD
- NYG – Amani Toomer – 2 receptions, 64 yards, TD

==== Week 13: at Baltimore Ravens ====
Week 13: Arizona Cardinals at Baltimore Ravens – Game summary

Quarter	1	2	3	4	Total
**Cardinals**	3	0	3	10	**16**
Ravens	0	3	7	3	**13**

at Memorial Stadium, Baltimore, Maryland

- Date: November 23
- Game time: 1:00 p.m. EST/11:00 a.m. MST
- Game weather: 48 °F (9 °C)
- Game attendance: 53,976
- Box Score

Game information

**First quarter**

- ARI – Joe Nedney 22-yard field goal. Cardinals 3–0.

**Second quarter**

- BAL – Matt Stover 46-yard field goal. Tied 3–3.

**Third quarter**

- ARI – Joe Nedney 37-yard field goal. Cardinals 6–3.
- BAL – Bam Morris 1-yard run (Matt Stover kick). Ravens 10–6.

**Fourth quarter**

- ARI – Frank Sanders 4-yard pass from Jake Plummer (Joe Nedney kick). Cardinals 13–10.
- BAL – Matt Stover 34-yard field goal. Tied 13–13.
- ARI – Joe Nedney 43-yard field goal. Cardinals 16–13.

**Top passers**

- ARI – Jake Plummer – 19/34, 218 yards, TD, 2 INT
- BAL – Vinny Testaverde – 21/37, 193 yards

**Top rushers**

- ARI – Larry Centers – 8 rushes, 36 yards
- BAL – Bam Morris – 20 rushes, 88 yards, TD

**Top receivers**

- ARI – Rob Moore – 8 receptions, 112 yards
- BAL – Michael Jackson – 4 receptions, 56 yards

==== Week 14: vs. Pittsburgh Steelers ====
Week 14: Pittsburgh Steelers at Arizona Cardinals – Game summary

Quarter	1	2	3	4	OT	Total
**Steelers**	7	3	7	3	6	**26**
Cardinals	0	3	14	3	0	**20**

at Sun Devil Stadium, Tempe, Arizona

- Date: November 30
- Game time: 2:00 p.m. MST
- Game weather: 56 °F (13 °C)
- Game attendance: 66,341
- Box Score

Game information

**First quarter**

- PIT – Jerome Bettis 2-yard run (Norm Johnson kick). Steelers 7–0.

**Second quarter**

- ARI – Joe Nedney 32-yard field goal. Steelers 7–3.
- PIT – Norm Johnson 40-yard field goal. Steelers 10–3.

**Third quarter**

- ARI – Frank Sanders 3-yard pass from Jake Plummer (Joe Nedney kick). Tied 10–10.
- PIT – Jerome Bettis 7-yard run (Norm Johnson kick). Steelers 17–10.
- ARI – Chris Gedney 11-yard pass from Jake Plummer (Joe Nedney kick). Tied 17–17.

**Fourth quarter**

- PIT – Norm Johnson 39-yard field goal. Steelers 20–17.
- ARI – Joe Nedney 19-yard field goal. Tied 20–20.

**Overtime**

- PIT – Jerome Bettis 10-yard run. Steelers 26–20.

**Top passers**

- PIT – Kordell Stewart – 18/35, 179 yards
- ARI – Jake Plummer – 15/26, 270 yards, 2 TD

**Top rushers**

- PIT – Jerome Bettis – 36 rushes, 142 yards, 3 TD
- ARI – Leeland McElroy – 9 rushes, 33 yards

**Top receivers**

- PIT – Yancey Thigpen – 5 receptions, 78 yards
- ARI – Rob Moore – 8 receptions, 188 yards

==== Week 15: vs. Washington Redskins ====
Week 15: Washington Redskins at Arizona Cardinals – Game summary

Quarter	1	2	3	4	Total
**Redskins**	7	10	7	14	**38**
Cardinals	0	14	7	7	**28**

at Sun Devil Stadium, Tempe, Arizona

- Date: December 7
- Game time: 2:00 p.m. MST
- Game weather: 57 °F (14 °C)
- Game attendance: 41,537
- Box Score

Game information

**First quarter**

- WAS – Brian Mitchell 63-yard punt return (Scott Blanton kick). Redskins 7–0.

**Second quarter**

- WAS – Larry Bowie 3-yard pass from Jeff Hostetler (Scott Blanton kick). Redskins 14–0.
- WAS – Scott Blanton 40-yard field goal. Redskins 17–0.
- ARI – Rob Moore 4-yard pass from Jake Plummer (Joe Nedney kick). Redskins 17–7.
- ARI – Rob Moore 29-yard pass from Jake Plummer (Joe Nedney kick). Redskins 17–14.

**Third quarter**

- WAS – Chris Dishman 21-yard interception return (Scott Blanton kick). Redskins 24–14.
- ARI – Chris Gedney 37-yard pass from Jake Plummer (Joe Nedney kick). Redskins 24–21.

**Fourth quarter**

- WAS – Henry Ellard 23-yard pass from Jeff Hostetler (Scott Blanton kick). Redskins 31–21.
- ARI – Rob Moore 47-yard pass from Jake Plummer (Joe Nedney kick). Redskins 31–28.
- WAS – Albert Connell 7-yard pass from Jeff Hostetler (Scott Blanton kick). Redskins 38–28.

**Top passers**

- WAS – Jeff Hostetler – 18/34, 226 yards, 3 TD, INT
- ARI – Jake Plummer – 19/38, 337 yards, 4 TD, 2 INT

**Top rushers**

- WAS – Stephen Davis – 20 rushes, 92 yards
- ARI – Ronald Moore – 13 rushes, 38 yards

**Top receivers**

- WAS – Brian Mitchell – 2 receptions, 79 yards
- ARI – Rob Moore – 5 receptions, 114 yards, 3 TD

==== Week 16: at New Orleans Saints ====
Week 16: Arizona Cardinals at New Orleans Saints – Game summary

Quarter	1	2	3	4	Total
Cardinals	7	3	0	0	**10**
**Saints**	0	3	7	17	**27**

at Louisiana Superdome, New Orleans, Louisiana

- Date: December 14
- Game time: 3:00 p.m. CST/2:00 p.m. MST
- Game weather: None (Indoor stadium)
- Game attendance: 45,517
- Referee: Johnny Grier
- TV announcers (FOX): Kenny Albert and Tim Green
- Box Score

Game information

**First quarter**

- ARI – Jake Plummer 10-yard run (Joe Nedney kick). Cardinals 7–0.

**Second quarter**

- NO – Doug Brien 20-yard field goal. Cardinals 7–3.
- ARI – Joe Nedney 30-yard field goal. Cardinals 10–3.

**Third quarter**

- NO – Randal Hill 9-yard pass from Billy Joe Hobert (Doug Brien kick). Tied 10–10.

**Fourth quarter**

- NO – Doug Brien 33-yard field goal. Saints 13–10.
- NO – Eric Guliford 16-yard pass from Billy Joe Hobert (Doug Brien kick). Saints 20–10.
- NO – John Farquhar 8-yard pass from Billy Joe Hobert (Doug Brien kick). Saints 27–10.

**Top passers**

- ARI – Jake Plummer – 17/37, 180 yards, 2 INT
- NO – Billy Joe Hobert – 14/24, 252 yards, 3 TD, INT

**Top rushers**

- ARI – Ronald Moore – 22 rushes, 79 yards
- NO – Ray Zellars – 19 rushes, 72 yards

**Top receivers**

- ARI – Frank Sanders – 4 receptions, 55 yards
- NO – Randal Hill – 5 receptions, 124 yards, TD

==== Week 17: vs. Atlanta Falcons ====
Week 17: Atlanta Falcons at Arizona Cardinals – Game summary

Quarter	1	2	3	4	Total
Falcons	14	3	3	6	**26**
**Cardinals**	7	7	0	15	**29**

at Sun Devil Stadium, Tempe, Arizona

- Date: December 21
- Game time: 2:00 p.m. MST
- Game weather: 55 °F (13 °C)
- Game attendance: 32,003
- Box Score

Game information

**First quarter**

- ATL – Bert Emanuel 38-yard pass from Chris Chandler (Morten Andersen kick). Falcons 7–0.
- ARI – Chris Gedney 1-yard pass from Jake Plummer (Joe Nedney kick). Tied 7–7.
- ATL – Terance Mathis 17-yard pass from Chris Chandler (Morten Andersen kick). Falcons 14–7.

**Second quarter**

- ATL – Morten Andersen 25-yard field goal. Falcons 17–7.
- ARI – Jake Plummer 1-yard run (Joe Nedney kick). Falcons 17–14.

**Third quarter**

- ATL – Morten Andersen 31-yard field goal. Falcons 20–14.

**Fourth quarter**

- ATL – Morten Andersen 20-yard field goal. Falcons 23–14.
- ATL – Morten Andersen 26-yard field goal. Falcons 26–14.
- ARI – Rob Moore 21-yard pass from Jake Plummer (Joe Nedney kick). Falcons 26–21.
- ARI – Larry Centers 1-yard pass from Jake Plummer (Joe Nedney kick). Cardinals 28–26.

**Top passers**

- ATL – Chris Chandler – 13/19, 176 yards, 2 TD
- ARI – Jake Plummer – 19/39, 237 yards, 3 TD, 2 INT

**Top rushers**

- ATL – Jamal Anderson – 33 rushes, 152 yards
- ARI – Ronald Moore – 10 rushes, 36 yards

**Top receivers**

- ATL – Bert Emanuel – 5 receptions, 75 yards, TD
- ARI – Rob Moore – 7 receptions, 91 yards, TD

=== Standings ===
NFC East
	W	L	T	PCT	PF	PA	STK
^{(3)} New York Giants	10	5	1	.656	307	265	W3
Washington Redskins	8	7	1	.531	327	289	W1
Philadelphia Eagles	6	9	1	.406	317	372	L3
Dallas Cowboys	6	10	0	.375	304	314	L5
Arizona Cardinals	4	12	0	.250	283	379	W1
