= Jake the Snake =

Jake the Snake may refer to:

- Jacques Plante (1929–1986), Canadian hockey player
- Jake Plummer (born 1974), American football player
- Jake Roberts (born 1955), American professional wrestler with one ring name being "the Snake"
