= 1997 Dallas Cowboys season =

NFL team season

- Owner: Jerry Jones
- General manager: Jerry Jones
- Head coach: Barry Switzer
- Offensive coordinator: Ernie Zampese
- Defensive coordinator: Dave Campo
- Home stadium: Texas Stadium

Results
- Record: 6–10
- Division place: 4th NFC East
- Playoffs: Did not qualify
- Pro Bowlers: G Larry Allen; G Nate Newton; CB Deion Sanders (did not play); S Darren Woodson (did not play)

Uniform
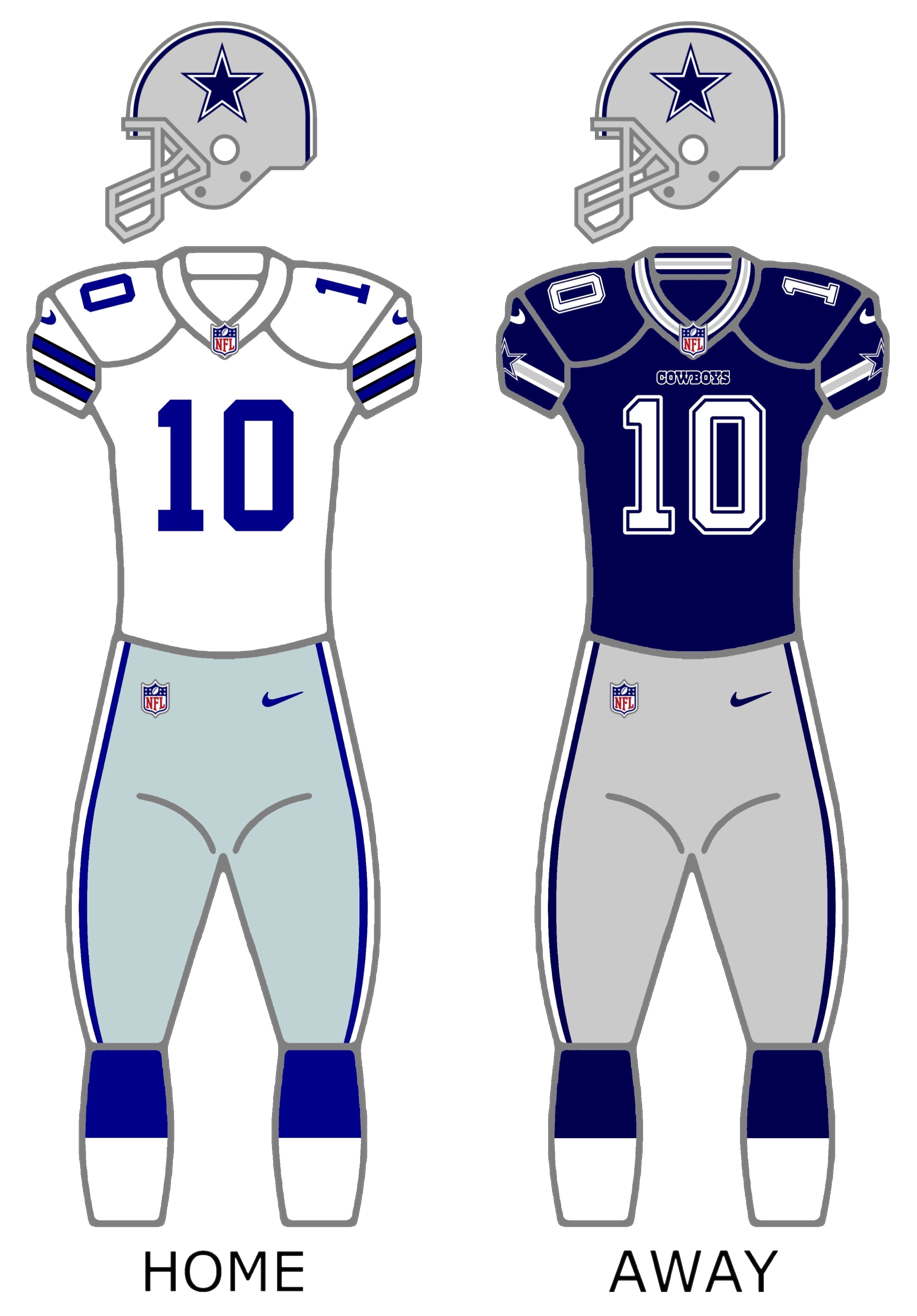

The 1997 Dallas Cowboys season was the franchise's 38th season in the National Football League (NFL) and was its fourth under head coach Barry Switzer. Before the season, the Cowboys were considered among the favorites to represent the NFC in Super Bowl XXXII. Instead, the team regressed significantly.

The Cowboys not only failed to improve on their 10–6 record from 1996, they finished with a 6-10 record. It was their first losing season since 1990, and as a result the Cowboys failed to qualify for the playoffs after six consecutive seasons of postseason appearances, including their three Super Bowl victories during the decade. A series of countless off-the-field incidents, lack of discipline, and rumors of infighting between quarterback Troy Aikman and head coach Barry Switzer plagued the team throughout the year. Switzer would resign from the Cowboys at the end of the campaign.

== Offseason ==
=== NFL draft ===
1997 Dallas Cowboys draft
Round	Pick	Player	Position	College	Notes
1	22	David LaFleur	Tight end	LSU	
3	65	Dexter Coakley *	Linebacker	Appalachian State	
3	83	Steve Scifres	Guard	Wyoming	
3	94	Kenny Wheaton	Cornerback	Oregon	
4	101	Antonio Anderson	Defensive tackle	Syracuse	
4	127	Macey Brooks	Wide receiver	James Madison	
4	129	Nicky Sualua	Fullback	Ohio State	
6	187	Lee Vaughn	Cornerback	Boston College	
Made roster † Pro Football Hall of Fame * Made at least one Pro Bowl during career

== Roster ==
Dallas Cowboys 1997 roster
Quarterbacks: 8 Troy Aikman; 17 Jason Garrett; 18 Wade Wilson; Running backs: 48 Daryl Johnston FB; 22 Emmitt Smith; 45 Nicky Sualua FB; 34 Herschel Walker; 20 Sherman Williams; Wide receivers: 87 Billy Davis; 88 Michael Irvin; 83 Anthony Miller; 80 Stepfret Williams; Tight ends: 86 Eric Bjornson; 81 Scott Galbraith; 89 David LaFleur	Offensive linemen: 73 Larry Allen G; 63 John Flannery G; 69 George Hegamin T; 66 Tony Hutson T; 61 Nate Newton G; 77 Steve Scifres G; 50 Clay Shiver C; 71 Mark Tuinei T; 79 Erik Williams T; Defensive linemen: 96 Antonio Anderson DT; 91 Darren Benson DT; 98 Shante Carver DE; 75 Tony Casillas DT; 95 Chad Hennings DT; 78 Leon Lett DT; 99 Hurvin McCormack DE; 97 Kavika Pittman DE; 92 Tony Tolbert DE	Linebackers: 52 Dexter Coakley OLB; 56 Randall Godfrey OLB; 58 Nate Hemsley MLB; 57 Vinson Smith OLB; 55 Fred Strickland MLB; 51 Broderick Thomas OLB; Defensive backs: 40 Bill Bates SS; 35 Wendell Davis CB; 31 Brock Marion FS; 23 Kevin Mathis CB; 27 Singor Mobley SS; 21 Deion Sanders CB; 26 Kevin Smith CB; 24 Omar Stoutmire FS; 30 Kenny Wheaton CB; 42 Charlie Williams CB; 28 Darren Woodson SS; Special teams: 3 Richie Cunningham K; 4 Toby Gowin P; 70 Dale Hellestrae LS	Reserve lists: 37 Lee Vaughn CB (IR); 19 Macey Brooks WR (IR); 32 Beau Morgan RB (Military); -- John Reece CB (IR); Practice squad: 49 Sean Simms TE; -- Emory Smith FB; Rookies in italics 53 active, 4 inactive, 2 practice squad

== Regular season ==
Though the season began well with an impressive win against the Pittsburgh Steelers and a 3–1 start, the Cowboys would soon see a sharp decline that included five consecutive losses to close out the year. A series of countless off-the-field incidents, lack of discipline, and rumors of infighting between quarterback Troy Aikman and head coach Barry Switzer plagued the team throughout the year. In a season filled with injuries and controversy, which also saw a tearful Michael Irvin promising change following a tough loss to the New York Giants in the final regular season game, Switzer would later resign after the season. Notable additions to the team were linebacker Dexter Coakley.

=== Schedule ===
Week	Date	Opponent	Result	Record	Venue	Recap
1	August 31	at Pittsburgh Steelers	**W** 37–7	1–0	Three Rivers Stadium	Recap
2	September 7	at **Arizona Cardinals**	**L** 22–25 (OT)	1–1	Sun Devil Stadium	Recap
3	September 15	**Philadelphia Eagles**	**W** 21–20	2–1	Texas Stadium	Recap
4	Bye					
5	September 28	Chicago Bears	**W** 27–3	3–1	Texas Stadium	Recap
6	October 5	at **New York Giants**	**L** 17–20	3–2	Giants Stadium	Recap
7	October 13	at **Washington Redskins**	**L** 16–21	3–3	Jack Kent Cooke Stadium	Recap
8	October 19	Jacksonville Jaguars	**W** 26–22	4–3	Texas Stadium	Recap
9	October 26	at **Philadelphia Eagles**	**L** 12–13	4–4	Veterans Stadium	Recap
10	November 2	at San Francisco 49ers	**L** 10–17	4–5	Candlestick Park	Recap
11	November 9	**Arizona Cardinals**	**W** 24–6	5–5	Texas Stadium	Recap
12	November 16	**Washington Redskins**	**W** 17–14	6–5	Texas Stadium	Recap
13	November 23	at Green Bay Packers	**L** 17–45	6–6	Lambeau Field	Recap
14	November 27	Tennessee Oilers	**L** 14–27	6–7	Texas Stadium	Recap
15	December 8	Carolina Panthers	**L** 13–23	6–8	Texas Stadium	Recap
16	December 14	at Cincinnati Bengals	**L** 24–31	6–9	Cinergy Field	Recap
17	December 21	**New York Giants**	**L** 7–20	6–10	Texas Stadium	Recap
Note: Intra-division opponents are in **bold** text.

=== Game summaries ===
==== Week 1 ====
Team	1	2	3	4	Total
• Cowboys	0	17	17	3	37
Steelers	0	0	0	7	7

- Date: August 31
- Location: Three Rivers Stadium, Pittsburgh, Pennsylvania
- Game start: 1:00 p.m. EST
- Game weather: 65 °F (18 °C); wind 4 mph (6.4 km/h)
- Referee: Jerry Markbreit
- TV announcers (FOX): Pat Summerall (play by play), John Madden (color commentator), Pam Oliver (sideline reporter)

Scoring summary
Q2	DAL	Miller 12 yard pass from Aikman (Cunningham kick)	DAL 7–0
Q2	DAL	Irvin 42 yard pass from Aikman (Cunningham kick)	DAL 14–0
Q2	DAL	Cunningham 52 yard field goal	DAL 17–0
Q3	DAL	Irvin 15 yard pass from Aikman (Cunningham kick)	DAL 24–0
Q3	DAL	Cunningham 24 yard field goal	DAL 27–0
Q3	DAL	Johnston 13 yard pass from Aikman (Cunningham kick)	DAL 34–0
Q4	DAL	Cunningham 28 yard field goal	DAL 37–0
Q4	PIT	Bruener 4 yard pass from Stewart (Johnson kick)	DAL 37–7

- Michael Irvin 7 Rec, 153 Yds

=== Standings ===
NFC East
	W	L	T	PCT	PF	PA	STK
^{(3)} New York Giants	10	5	1	.656	307	265	W3
Washington Redskins	8	7	1	.531	327	289	W1
Philadelphia Eagles	6	9	1	.406	317	372	L3
Dallas Cowboys	6	10	0	.375	304	314	L5
Arizona Cardinals	4	12	0	.250	283	379	W1

== Awards and records ==
- Troy Aikman, Walter Payton Man of the Year Award

== Publications ==
The Football Encyclopedia ISBN 0-312-11435-4
Total Football ISBN 0-06-270170-3
Cowboys Have Always Been My Heroes ISBN 0-446-51950-2
