= Antwuan Wyatt =

American football player (born 1975)

No. 85
- Position: Wide receiver

Personal information
- Born: July 18, 1975 (age 51); Daytona Beach, Florida, U.S.
- Listed height: 5 ft 10 in (1.78 m)
- Listed weight: 193 lb (88 kg)

Career information
- High school: Mainland (Daytona Beach)
- College: Bethune-Cookman
- NFL draft: 1997: 6th round, 190th overall pick

Career history
- Philadelphia Eagles (1997); Miami Dolphins (1998)*; Orlando Predators (1999–2000); Carolina Cobras (2000)
- * Offseason or practice squad member only

Awards and highlights
- ArenaBowl champion (2000)

Career NFL statistics
- Return yards: 48
- Stats at Pro Football Reference

Career AFL statistics
- Receptions: 26
- Receiving yards: 320
- Touchdowns: 7
- Stats at ArenaFan.com

Antwuan Bernard Wyatt (born July 18, 1975) is an American former professional football player who was a wide receiver for the Philadelphia Eagles of the National Football League (NFL) in 1997. He played college football for the Bethune-Cookman. He was selected in the sixth round of the 1997 NFL draft.
