= Tony McCombs =

American football player (born 1974)

No. 50
- Position: Linebacker

Personal information
- Born: August 24, 1974 (age 52); Hopkinsville, Kentucky, U.S.
- Listed height: 6 ft 2 in (1.88 m)
- Listed weight: 246 lb (112 kg)

Career information
- High school: Christian County (Hopkinsville)
- College: Eastern Kentucky
- NFL draft: 1997: 6th round, 188th overall pick

Career history
- Arizona Cardinals (1997–1998); Cleveland Browns (2000)*
- * Offseason or practice squad member only

Career NFL statistics
- Tackles: 50
- Interceptions: 1
- Fumble recoveries: 1
- Stats at Pro Football Reference

Tony McCombs (born August 24, 1974) is an American former professional football player who was a linebacker in the National Football League (NFL). He played college football for the Eastern Kentucky Colonels and was selected in the sixth round of the 1997 NFL draft. He played for the Arizona Cardinals from 1997 to 1998.
