= Jerome Daniels =

American football player (born 1974)

No. 72, 79
- Positions: Guard, tackle

Personal information
- Born: September 13, 1974 (age 52); Hartford, Connecticut, U.S.
- Listed height: 6 ft 5 in (1.96 m)
- Listed weight: 350 lb (159 kg)

Career information
- High school: Bloomfield (CT)
- College: Northeastern
- NFL draft: 1997: 4th round, 121st overall pick

Career history
- Miami Dolphins (1997)*; Baltimore Ravens (1997)*; Arizona Cardinals (1997–1999); New York/New Jersey Hitmen (2001)
- * Offseason or practice squad member only

Career NFL statistics
- Games played: 8
- Games started: 5
- Stats at Pro Football Reference

Jerome Daniels (born September 13, 1974) is an American former professional football player who was a guard and tackle in the National Football League (NFL). He played college football for the Northeastern Huskies and was selected by the Miami Dolphins in the fourth round (121st overall). He played for the Baltimore Ravens in 1997 and Arizona Cardinals from 1998 to 2001. Daniels also played for the New York/New Jersey Hitmen in 2001 and 2002.
