= Plummer Family Helluva Handball Bash =

The Plummer Family Helluva Handball Bash (formerly known as Jake Plummer's Annual Halloween Handball Bash) is an annual American handball tournament which takes place each Fall in Coeur d'Alene, Idaho. Organized by former NFL Quarterback Jake Plummer, the event was first held in 2008 and now draws many top handball professionals each year. In 2010 the event drew roughly a dozen top professionals and over one hundred amateur competitors. Elite handballers to attend include Emmett Peixoto, who has been the number one ranked Three–Wall Handball player in the United States. Plummer hopes to make the event "the Super Bowl of handball".

Plummer attempts to ensure that the event has a low–key atmosphere. Both beer and Gatorade are served as refreshment for the athletes, even during morning matches. The event, which takes place at Peak Health and Wellness Center, also includes a youth clinic. Competitors in the event raise money for local charities.
