= Jake Plummer =

American football player (born 1974)

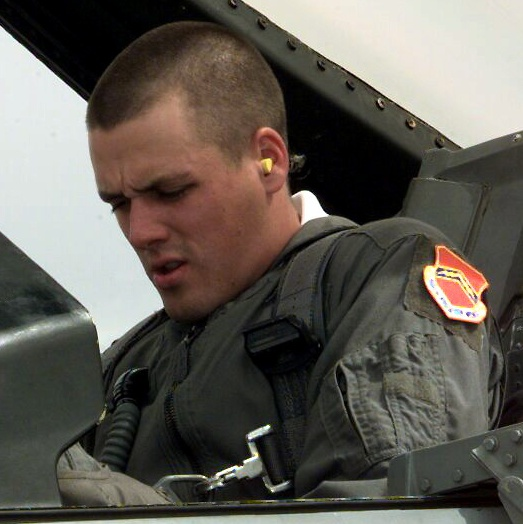
- Plummer at Luke Air Force Base in 1998

No. 16
- Position: Quarterback

Personal information
- Born: December 19, 1974 (age 51); Boise, Idaho, U.S.
- Listed height: 6 ft 2 in (1.88 m)
- Listed weight: 212 lb (96 kg)

Career information
- High school: Capital (Boise)
- College: Arizona State (1993–1996)
- NFL draft: 1997: 2nd round, 42nd overall pick

Career history
- Arizona Cardinals (1997–2002); Denver Broncos (2003–2006); Tampa Bay Buccaneers (2007)*
- * Offseason or practice squad member only

Awards and highlights
- Pro Bowl (2005); PFWA All-Rookie Team (1997); First-team All-American (1996); Pac-10 Offensive Player of the Year (1996); Pop Warner Trophy (1996); 2× First-team All-Pac-10 (1995, 1996)

Career NFL statistics
- Passing attempts: 4,350
- Passing completions: 2,484
- Completion percentage: 57.1%
- TD–INT: 161–161
- Passing yards: 29,253
- Passer rating: 74.6
- Stats at Pro Football Reference
- College Football Hall of Fame

Jason Steven "Jake" Plummer (born December 19, 1974) is an American former professional football player who was a quarterback for 10 seasons in the National Football League (NFL). He played college football for the Arizona State Sun Devils. Plummer was selected by the Arizona Cardinals in the second round of the 1997 NFL draft, spending six seasons with the Cardinals and then four with the Denver Broncos.

Since retiring from the field, he launched Umbo, a functional mushroom supplement company alongside former UFC Champion Rashad Evans. He subsequently founded MyCOLove Farm in Fort Lupton, Colorado, to better understand mushrooms and mycology.

His nickname, "Jake the Snake", has no connection to professional wrestler Jake "the Snake" Roberts. Coincidentally, Plummer and Roberts each adopted the nickname as a tribute to former Oakland Raiders quarterback Ken Stabler, who was nicknamed "Snake."

== Early life ==
Plummer was born in Boise, Idaho; he and his two older brothers grew up in Smiley Creek. They were often at the family lumber mill and warehouse in the town of 50 in the Sawtooths (the mountains of the Sawtooth Range).

In his youth, Plummer attended Pierce Park Elementary and Hillside Junior High. In third grade at Pierce Park, he started going by Jake after being asked by his teacher to use a different name because there were four other students named Jason. He graduated from Capital High School in 1993, where he was a three-sport star in high school, playing baseball and basketball in addition to football; he was also selected all-state as both a quarterback and punter and passed for 6,097 yards and 68 touchdowns in his junior and senior years. He originally wanted to play football at Stanford, but they only offered him a preferred walk-on offer; he instead accepted a full ride from California until Hue Jackson, then a coach at Arizona State, heavily recruited Plummer and eventually convinced him to recommit to the Sun Devils. He also received scholarship offers from Boise State, Idaho, Montana, Oregon State, Washington State, and Wyoming.

== College career ==
Plummer accepted a football scholarship to Arizona State University in Tempe. He did not redshirt and took over as the starting quarterback (from Grady Benton) early in his freshman season in 1993. He had consistent, but not outstanding, statistical output during his career, and never led the Pac-10 in any major statistical category. He threw for an impressive 1,650 yards in his freshman season, but also had seven interceptions to just nine touchdowns. He broke 2,000 yards in 1994 as a sophomore, and upped his touchdowns to 15. As a junior in 1995, his 2,222 yards and 17 touchdowns, many coming at pivotal moments in games, earned him a strong fan base and all-conference honors despite a lackluster 6–5 record.

His senior season in 1996 was arguably the best in school history. Arizona State attracted national attention on September 21 when they shut out top-ranked Nebraska 19–0 to snap the Huskers' 26-game winning streak. Plummer evaded a sack to toss a 25-yard touchdown on the game's opening drive, and finished 20 of 36 for 292 yards, setting a new school record for career passing yards in the process. He led ASU to an undefeated regular season and a Pac-10 championship, aided in no small part by fellow all-conference linebacker and close personal friend Pat Tillman. In the Rose Bowl, he scored a sensational 11-yard go-ahead touchdown run late in the fourth quarter, but Ohio State responded and won 20–17. A victory likely would have meant a national championship as the only undefeated team in the nation, but their final ranking was fourth. Plummer was third in the Heisman Trophy voting behind Florida's Danny Wuerffel and Iowa State's Troy Davis, was a first-team All-American, and the Pac-10's Offensive Player of the Year.

Plummer ended his career with several school records; most have since been surpassed, but his 34 games with a rushing or passing touchdown remains an ASU record. A dedicated student, Plummer was also a two-time Academic All-Conference player. A 2013 review listed Jake Plummer as the best player to wear number 16 in Sun Devil history.

== Professional career ==
Pre-draft measurables
Height	Weight	Arm length	Hand span	40-yard dash	10-yard split	20-yard split	20-yard shuttle	Three-cone drill	Vertical jump
6 ft 2 1/4 in (1.89 m)	195 lb (88 kg)	33 in (0.84 m)	9 1/4 in (0.23 m)	4.96 s	1.71 s	2.93 s	4.29 s	7.30 s	30.0 in (0.76 m)
All values from NFL Combine

=== Arizona Cardinals (1997–2002) ===
Plummer was selected in the second round of the 1997 NFL draft by the Arizona Cardinals. He played behind Kent Graham and Stoney Case at the start of his rookie season. He took his first snap late in the 4th quarter of the seventh game, and promptly led the Cardinals on a 98-yard drive, going 4-of-6 for 87 yards and capping it with a 31-yard go-ahead touchdown. He led the Cardinals to three of their four victories that year. Already locally popular from his days at ASU, according to teammate Chad Carpenter he was now treated "like a god. We go to a restaurant and people stand up and clap when he walks by." In 1998, the Cardinals drafted Plummer's friend Pat Tillman, and the two started all sixteen games en route to a 9–7 regular season record. In the tenth game against Dallas Cowboys, he threw for a stellar 465 yards and three touchdowns. In the playoffs, he led the Cardinals to an upset of the same Cowboys for the franchise's first postseason victory since 1947, before losing in the second round to the Minnesota Vikings.

Plummer had a disappointing season in 1999; he went 3–8 as a starter, threw nine touchdowns to 24 interceptions, and the Cardinals finished 6–10. Regarding Plummer's season, the Football Outsiders commented: "At the start of the 1999 season, Jake Plummer was being celebrated as one of the NFL's best young quarterbacks, the man who would make the Cardinals respectable again. By the end of the 1999 season, Plummer ranked as the league's worst quarterback." His reputation as a risk-taking "gunslinger" became a liability. In 2000 Plummer threw for 2,946 yards, 21 interceptions, and had a 66.0 quarterback rating. Although he reached 10,000 career passing yards (in 47 starts), Plummer compiled a 3–11 record and the Cardinals finished last in the NFC East.

Plummer bounced back in 2001 with his best statistical season with the Cardinals. He was one of only two NFL quarterbacks to take every snap for his team (Kerry Collins was the other), and he passed for 3,653 yards, eighteen touchdowns, and fourteen interceptions. During the season, he had a stretch of 142 consecutive pass attempts without throwing an interception. Plummer also led the NFL in fourth-quarter passing yards (1,227) and the Cardinals to a 7–9 record.

Plummer's last season with the Cardinals was 2002 and again his statistics were down (65.7 passer rating, 2,972 yards, eighteen touchdowns and twenty interceptions). On September 22 against the San Diego Chargers, he eclipsed 15,000 career passing yards.

As of 2017's NFL off-season, Jake Plummer held at least nine Cardinals franchise records, including:

- Passing TDs: rookie season (fifteen in 1997), rookie game (four on 1997-12-07 WAS)
- Passer Rating: rookie game (119.1 on 1997-11-30 PIT)
- Sacked: game (ten on 1997-11-30 PIT), rookie season (52 in 1997)
- Yds/Pass Att: rookie season (7.44 in 1997)
- Pass Yds/Game: rookie season (220.3 in 1997)
- 300-yard passing games: playoffs (two)

=== Denver Broncos (2003–2006) ===
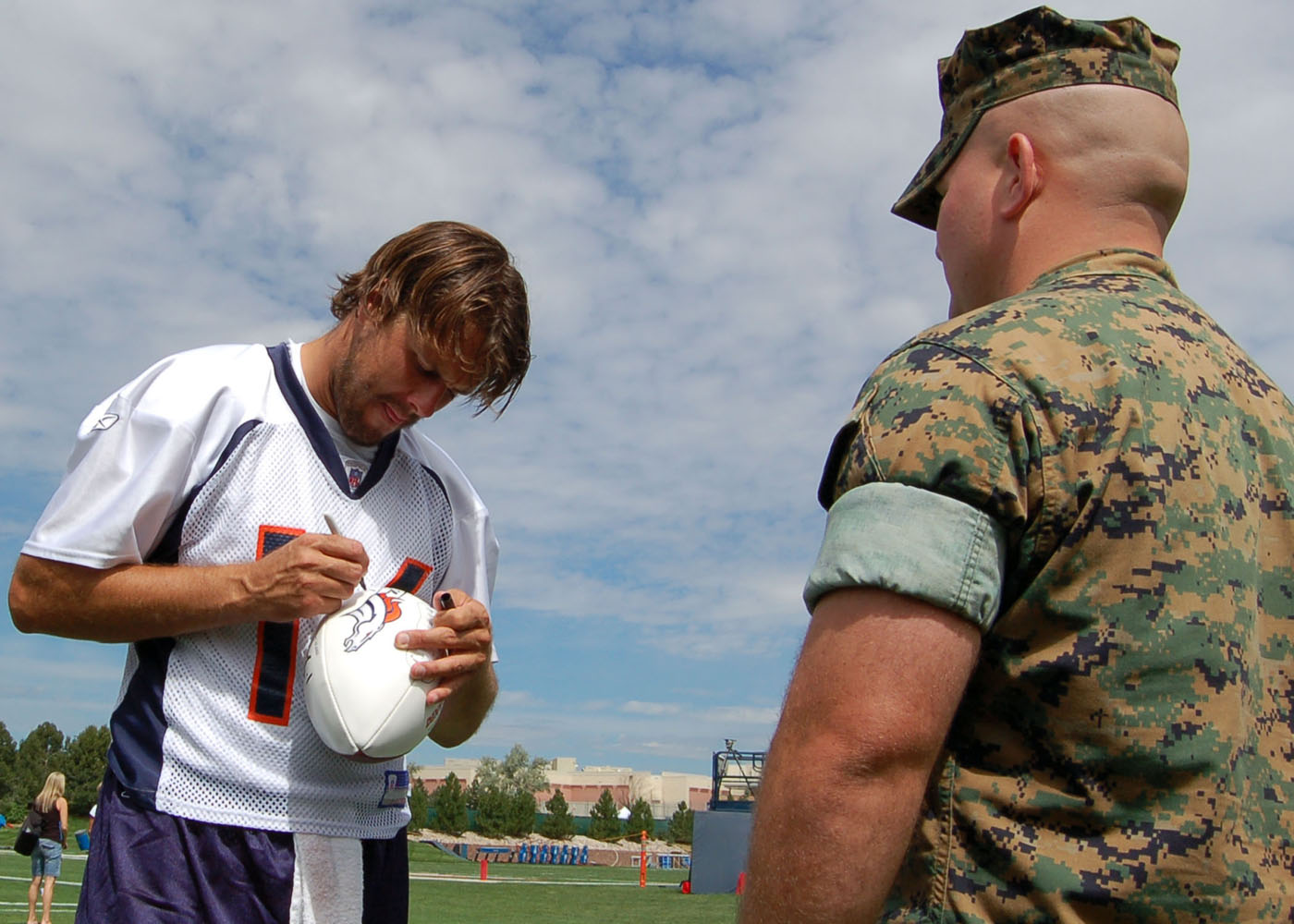
Plummer signs a football at Broncos training camp in 2006

After spending 5 seasons in Arizona, Plummer signed as a free agent with the Denver Broncos in 2003, replacing Brian Griese. Though the laid-back Plummer would clash often with the domineering head coach Mike Shanahan, his guidance helped Plummer finish with a career-high 91.2 quarterback rating. On September 22, he had the longest run by a Broncos QB on Monday Night Football, a 40-yard scramble in a 31–10 win over the Oakland Raiders. He led the Broncos to a wild card playoff berth, where the Broncos were beaten 41–10 by the Indianapolis Colts.

In 2004 he matched or surpassed several of Broncos Hall of Fame QB John Elway's passing records (including passing yardage and passing touchdowns in a single season). In the opening game victory against Kansas City, he reached 20,000 career passing yards. In the eighth game, he threw for a spectacular 499 yards and four touchdowns against Atlanta. However, continuing a career-long shortcoming, he also threw three interceptions in the loss, and led the league that season with twenty. He led the Broncos to a second straight wild card playoff berth, but the Broncos were again beaten by the Colts 49–24, despite Plummer's 103.1 passer rating in the contest.

In 2005, Plummer experienced arguably his best season as a professional. He threw 229 passes without an interception, the longest such streak of his career. He also began serving as Denver's holder, which he would continue to do through the 2006 season, as well. Along the way, Plummer helped the Broncos compile a 13–3 record, a #2 seed, and a first round bye in the AFC playoffs (behind the Colts). He also earned a Pro Bowl selection. The Broncos' first game was against the New England Patriots in the AFC Divisional Game at Invesco Field. Although not outstanding, Plummer's performance (15-for-26 for 197 yards, one touchdown, one interception) helped the Broncos break the Patriots' winning streak of eleven postseason games and gain their first postseason victory since Super Bowl XXXIII. However, Plummer accounted for four turnovers in the AFC Championship game and the Broncos were defeated 34–17 by the eventual Super Bowl champion Pittsburgh Steelers.

On November 27, 2006, after a lackluster performance in the first eleven games, and following back-to-back losses to the San Diego Chargers and Kansas City Chiefs, head coach Mike Shanahan announced that Plummer would be replaced at starting quarterback by rookie Jay Cutler. The decision to hand a 7–4 team over to a rookie quarterback was met by fans and media with mixed reactions. Those who viewed Plummer as inconsistent heralded the change as one that would revive the Broncos' struggling offense; others claimed such a move was ill-advised, especially given that Plummer had guided the Broncos to the AFC Championship game the year before; Plummer had also been 40–18 with Denver in both regular season and playoff games, while leading his teams to thirty game-tying/winning drives in his career, a league high. In the last game of the season, Plummer came off the bench against the San Francisco 49ers after Cutler suffered a concussion. He played the remainder of the first half before Cutler played the second half.

As of the 2017 NFL off-season, Plummer holds at least two Broncos franchise records, including:

- Passing Yards: game (499 on 2004-10-31 ATL)
- Passer Rating: playoff season (103.1 in 2004)

=== Tampa Bay Buccaneers (2007) ===
On March 3, 2007, Plummer was traded to the Tampa Bay Buccaneers for a 2008 conditional draft pick. However, rumors began to surface that Plummer was going to choose retirement over competition with the Buccaneers' four other quarterbacks on the roster (Bruce Gradkowski, Tim Rattay, Jeff Garcia, and Luke McCown). On March 9, Plummer ended the speculation by announcing his decision to retire. Plummer also confirmed his retirement through the Jake Plummer Foundation's website.

Since he was still under contract to the Buccaneers and had already been given his contract signing bonus, Tampa Bay coach Jon Gruden met with Plummer in July to try to convince him to reconsider and report for training camp. However, the attempt was unsuccessful and the team sued for recovery of the bonus. A settlement was finally reached on June 10, 2008, in which Plummer was required to pay back $3.5 million to the Buccaneers.

== Career statistics ==
Legend
	Led the league
**Bold**	Career high

=== NFL ===
Year	Team	Games			Passing								Rushing			
Year	Team	GP	GS	Record	Cmp	Att	Pct	Yds	Avg	TD	Int	Rtg	Att	Yds	Avg	TD
1997	ARI	10	9	3–6	157	296	53.0	2,203	7.4	15	15	73.1	39	216	5.5	2
1998	ARI	16	16	9–7	**324**	**547**	59.2	3,737	6.8	17	20	75.0	51	217	4.3	**4**
1999	ARI	12	11	3–8	201	381	52.8	2,111	5.5	9	**24**	50.8	39	121	3.1	2
2000	ARI	14	14	3–11	270	475	56.8	2,946	6.2	13	21	66.0	37	183	4.9	0
2001	ARI	16	16	7–9	304	525	57.9	3,653	7.0	18	14	79.6	35	163	4.7	0
2002	ARI	16	16	5–11	284	530	53.6	2,972	5.6	18	20	65.7	46	**283**	**6.2**	2
2003	DEN	11	11	9–2	189	302	**62.6**	2,182	7.2	15	7	**91.2**	37	205	5.5	3
2004	DEN	16	16	10–6	303	521	58.2	**4,089**	**7.8**	**27**	20	84.5	**62**	202	3.3	1
2005	DEN	16	16	**13–3**	277	456	60.7	3,366	7.4	18	7	90.2	46	151	3.3	2
2006	DEN	16	11	7–4	175	317	55.2	1,994	6.3	11	13	68.8	36	112	3.1	1
Total		143	136	69–67	2,484	4,350	57.1	29,253	6.7	161	161	74.6	428	1,853	4.3	17

=== College ===
Season	Team	GP	Passing						
Season	Team	GP	Cmp	Att	Pct	Yds	TD	Int	Rtg
1993	Arizona State	9	102	199	51.3	1,650	9	7	128.8
1994	Arizona State	11	159	294	54.1	2,179	15	**9**	127.1
1995	Arizona State	11	173	301	**57.5**	2,222	17	**9**	132.1
1996	Arizona State	11	**179**	**313**	57.2	**2,575**	**23**	**9**	**144.8**
College career		42	613	1,107	55.4	8,626	64	34	133.8
School rank		—	4th	3rd	—	3rd	4th	—	

== Handball ==
Since his retirement from the NFL, Plummer has been an avid player of four-wall handball. He attended his first professional handball tournament in 2007 when he entered the Simple Green US Open of Handball (with brother Eric) in the pro doubles division where the pair lost to future Hall of Fame members John Bike and Danny Bell. In 2008, Plummer hosted his own pro invitational and lost in the finals of the pro consolation bracket to #37 ranked, Jeff Kastner. Also in 2008, Plummer lost in the semifinals of the 2008's Idaho State Singles Championships to his brother (the eventual champion).

== Personal life ==
Plummer at a Broncos Salute to Service practice in 2026

Plummer married former Broncos cheerleader Kollette Klassen on August 26, 2007, whom he met in 2005. In June 2010, Kollette gave birth to the couple's first child. After retiring from the NFL, Plummer moved to Sandpoint, Idaho (though the couple also has a house in Boulder, Colorado) where he lives in relative anonymity. His former agent Leigh Steinberg said he is "one of the minuscule few that I could see living a completely fulfilled life away from sport... he was as close to an egoless major star as I've seen." When a concerned Meals on Wheels supervisor in Sandpoint insisted that a jobless, "scruffy", long-time volunteer who worked for her, keep track of the miles he drove for the organization for reimbursement, she was "dumbstruck" to discover he was a former NFL star.

The lifestyle contrasted with the somewhat rocky moments during his playing days with much attention devoted to flipping off a fan, a loud traffic dispute, and a feud with a Denver gossip columnist. Plummer has also stirred controversy with his support of medical marijuana, which he claims to use regularly to deal with lingering post-football injuries, and hostile reaction to Jerry Jones' dismissal of NFL players with brain injuries. Plummer also started an Alzheimer's foundation, made time during his career to walk dogs at a shelter he donated $10,000 to on retirement, and developed personal connections with children affected by 9/11.

On June 27, 1997, he struck a plea agreement rather than fight charges alleging that he grabbed four women at a nightclub in Tempe, Arizona. He received two years probation, was fined $1,020, and ordered to perform 100 hours of community service. Probation ended after only 9 months due to exemplary behavior with a court spokeswoman stating, "He has done everything we have asked of him, more in fact, significantly more."

In September 2007, Plummer was inducted into the Arizona State Hall of Fame. Later that year, he made a brief appearance in the 2007 Holiday Bowl, when he introduced the ASU players prior to the team playing game. On October 29, 2010, Plummer was honored, along with all Sun Devil Quarterbacks, at a Legends Luncheon hosted by the Arizona State University Alumni Association and Sun Devil Club. Other honorees included Danny White, Andrew Walter, John F. Goodman, and Jeff Van Raaphorst. Plummer has been an assistant football coach at Sandpoint High School since 2009.

== Relationship with Pat Tillman ==
Plummer was a teammate of Pat Tillman, a safety, at both Arizona State and the Arizona Cardinals and the two were close friends. After the 2001 season, while Plummer was still with the Cardinals, Tillman joined the U.S. Army Rangers in response to 9/11. During leave in January 2004, the two showed up unannounced at a handball tournament in Seattle in support of Jake's brother, Eric.

After Tillman's death in Afghanistan on April 22, 2004, all NFL players wore a memorial decal on their helmets on September 24 in honor of Tillman and the Cardinals continued to wear this decal throughout the 2004 season. Plummer by this point was with the Broncos, requested to wear the decal for the entire season, but the NFL turned him down because his helmet would not be the same as the rest of his team. For the 2005 season Plummer grew an untrimmed, full beard and wore his hair long in honor of Tillman, who had worn that style in the NFL before he cut his hair and shaved off his beard in accordance with military uniform regulations. Plummer gave Tillman's funeral eulogy in a suit and flip-flops in honor of his friend's trademark style.

== Medical cannabis advocacy ==
Plummer uses cannabidiol (CBD) to treat the pain, inflammation, and headaches that he has experienced as a result of his years playing football. He says that his condition improved so much after he started taking CBD that he considered a return to the NFL, almost a decade after retiring. He has served as a spokesperson for CW Botanicals, a company which manufactures CBD products. He has also helped raise funds for cannabinoid research.

In November 2016, Plummer was one of the signatories of an open letter addressed to the NFL, urging a change in the league's policy towards cannabis. Doctors for Cannabis Regulation wrote the letter and it was signed by several NFL players. He is also a member of the Doctors for Cannabis Regulation NFL steering committee.
