= Nicky Sualua =

American football player (born 1975)

No. 45
- Position: Fullback

Personal information
- Born: April 16, 1975 (age 51); Santa Ana, California, U.S.
- Listed height: 5 ft 11 in (1.80 m)
- Listed weight: 260 lb (118 kg)

Career information
- High school: Mater Dei (Santa Ana)
- College: Ohio State
- NFL draft: 1997: 4th round, 129th overall pick

Career history
- Dallas Cowboys (1997–1998); Cincinnati Bengals (1999)*
- * Offseason or practice squad member only

Career NFL statistics
- Games played: 26
- Games started: 1
- Stats at Pro Football Reference

Nicky Sualua (born April 16, 1975) is an American former professional football player who was a fullback for the Dallas Cowboys of the National Football League (NFL). He played college football for the Ohio State Buckeyes and was selected by the Cowboys in the fourth round of the 1997 NFL draft.

== Early life ==
Sualua began playing football in his freshman year at Santiago High School, where he was a guard and defensive tackle. The next year, he transferred to Mater Dei High School, where he played as a fullback and defensive end. As a sophomore, he helped his team compile a 13–1 record and win the state title.

As a senior, he had 85 carries for 562 yards (6.6 avg.) and nine touchdowns, despite missing five games with a high ankle sprain he suffered in the opening game. He was voted the MVP of the South Coast League and scored six touchdowns in the opening round of the playoffs. He also lettered in wrestling and weightlifting, winning the state title in 1991.

== College career ==
Sualua accepted a football scholarship from Ohio State University. After being redshirted as a freshman, he started the last eight games of his sophomore year at fullback, blocking for Eddie George. He tallied 18 carries for 106 yards and seven receptions for 70 yards. He posted career-highs with six carries for 44 yards against the University of Alabama in the Citrus Bowl.

He started the final 10 games of his junior season, blocking for George on his way to winning the Heisman Trophy in 1995. He registered 18 carries for 106 rushing yards (5.9 avg.), 17 receptions for 129 yards and two touchdowns. He had career-highs with 5 receptions for 57 yards against the University of Michigan.

He declared as an early entrant to the NFL draft, after being ruled academically ineligible to play in his senior season (1996).

== Professional career ==
=== Dallas Cowboys ===
Sualua was selected in the fourth round (129th overall) of the 1997 NFL draft by the Dallas Cowboys, to develop as the eventual successor to Pro Bowl fullback Daryl Johnston. As a rookie, he was declared inactive in the first 6 games, until Johnston suffered a season ending neck injury against the Washington Redskins in the sixth contest of the season. Although he was active, he remained a backup behind Herschel Walker until the season finale against the New York Giants.

On May 6, 1999, former Pro Bowl offensive tackle Mark Tuinei was found unconscious in his car after spending the previous evening with Sualua. He was pronounced dead upon arrival at a hospital in the Dallas suburb of Plano, with the autopsy revealing that he died of a combination of heroin and a form of the drug ecstasy. His death was ruled an accidental overdose and Sualua was never charged or suspended for the events surrounding Tuinei's death.

He was waived on June 15, 1999, with the team claiming it was for football reasons. In his first two years he was mainly a backup and played on the special teams units.

=== Cincinnati Bengals ===
On June 25, 1999, Sualua was signed by the Cincinnati Bengals. He was released with an injury settlement on September 2.

== Personal life ==
His cousin Troy Polamalu was an All-Pro strong safety for the Pittsburgh Steelers. Another cousin, Rawlston Masaniai, played soccer for the American Samoa national team.
