= Chris Boniol =

American football player and coach (born 1971)

No. 18
- Position: Kicker

Personal information
- Born: December 9, 1971 (age 54); Alexandria, Louisiana, U.S.
- Listed height: 5 ft 11 in (1.80 m)
- Listed weight: 167 lb (76 kg)

Career information
- High school: Alexandria
- College: Louisiana Tech
- NFL draft: 1994: undrafted

Career history

Playing
- Dallas Cowboys (1994–1996); Philadelphia Eagles (1997–1998); Cleveland Browns (1999)*; Chicago Bears (1999)
- * Offseason or practice squad member only

Coaching
- Dallas Cowboys (2010–2013) Assistant special teams coach; Oakland Raiders (2014) Assistant special teams coach; Louisiana College (2015) Special teams coordinator and running backs coach; Mississippi State (2016–2018) Senior special teams advisor; Tampa Bay Buccaneers (2019–2022) Specialists coach; Birmingham Stallions (2023–2025) Special teams coordinator

Awards and highlights
- As player: Super Bowl champion (XXX); PFWA All-Rookie Team (1994); All-Big West (1993); All-South Independent (1990); As coach: Super Bowl champion (LV); UFL champion (2024)

Career NFL statistics
- Field goal attempts: 163
- Field goals made: 128
- Field goal %: 78.5
- Stats at Pro Football Reference

Christopher Donald Boniol (born December 9, 1971) is an American football coach and former placekicker in the National Football League (NFL) for the Dallas Cowboys, Philadelphia Eagles and Chicago Bears. He won Super Bowl XXX with the Cowboys. In 1996, he tied the NFL record for most field goals in a game with seven. He played college football at Louisiana Tech University.

== Early life ==
Boniol attended Alexandria Senior High School in Alexandria, Louisiana, where he was the placekicker for the football. As a senior, he made 34-of-35 extra points, hit a 47-yard field goal and averaged 41.8 yards-per-punt. He finished his high school career after making 10-of-18 career field goals and 113-of-121 extra points.

In baseball, he was the starting catcher and played for his father Don. He contributed to the team winning the state baseball championship.

== College career ==
Boniol accepted a football scholarship from Louisiana Tech University. As a freshman, he made 17-of-24 field goals and 38-of-39 extra points. In the second game against McNeese State University, he hit a career-long 55-yard field goal (second in school history). In the 1990 Independence Bowl, his 29-yard field goal on the final play set a 34–34 tie against the University of Maryland. He received All-Louisiana and Louisiana Freshman of the Year honors.

As a sophomore, he connected on a 54-yard field goal on the final play of a 17–14 win over Eastern Michigan University. He contributed to a 12–12 tie against the University of South Carolina, by making a 38-yard field goal with 2 seconds left.

As a junior, he contributed to the school's first-ever win over a Southwest Conference team, by hitting a 30-yard field goal on the last play to defeat Baylor University 10–9.

As a senior, he led the team in scoring with 57 points and provided the only scoring in three of 11 games. Against Northern Illinois, Boniol's 26-yard field goal proved to be the winning margin in a 17–16 Bulldogs win.

He finished his college career third on the school's all-time scoring list (255 points) and owning most of the kicking records. He recorded 50-of-81 field goals (.617), five from over 50 yards and won or tied five contests in the final seconds.

In 2018, he was named one of the greatest 50 players in school history.

== Professional career ==
=== Dallas Cowboys ===
Boniol was signed as an undrafted free agent by the Dallas Cowboys after the 1994 NFL draft on April 29. He made 22-of-29 field goal attempts (75.9%) to set a rookie franchise record for field goal percentage.

In 1995, he missed the first 3 preseason with a pulled quadriceps in his right leg, forcing the Cowboys to make the unconventional move of keeping rookie Jon Baker as a kickoff specialist. He struggled in the third week against the Minnesota Vikings, missing a field goal and an extra point from close range, in game the Cowboys won 23–17 in overtime. He would settle down, establishing a club record for the longest streak of consecutive field goals made with 26. His 96.4 percent (27 field goals out of 28 attempts) season kicking percentage ranked as the highest in club history and second in NFL history. His 127 points were the fourth-most points in franchise history and the most by a kicker.

In 1996, he broke his own club record for the longest streak of consecutive field goals made with 27 (it was broken by Dan Bailey in 2014). He also tied an NFL record with 7 field goals made in a game, during a Monday night contest against the Green Bay Packers. That year, he became the first player in team history to win the NFC Special Teams Player of the Week two times in a season, with the second award coming after the Wild Card Playoff win over the Minnesota Vikings. He set a club mark with 32 field goals, became the first Cowboy to have three consecutive 100-point seasons and ranked second in club history with most field goals made in a career.

=== Philadelphia Eagles ===
On March 14, 1997, Boniol was signed as a restricted free agent by the Philadelphia Eagles, after the salary cap-strapped Cowboys could not match the Eagles' four-year offer. He played in Philadelphia for 2 seasons, but was inconsistent making field goals over 40 yards. He was passed on depth chart by Norm Johnson and was released on August 17, 1999.

=== Cleveland Browns ===
On August 21, 1999, he was signed as a free agent by the Cleveland Browns. On September 3, he was cut after not being able to pass Phil Dawson on the depth chart.

=== Chicago Bears ===
On October 13, 1999, he signed with the Chicago Bears as a free agent, to replace an injured Jeff Jaeger. He missed 4-of-9 field goal attempts, including a possible game-winner in overtime against the Minnesota Vikings. On December 27, he was released and replaced with Jaret Holmes.

Boniol played in the NFL for six seasons, making 128-of-163 field goals and 183-of-189 extra points for 567 points.

== Coaching career ==
Boniol was an assistant coach for the Dallas Cowboys from 2010 to 2013, focusing on kickers and punters. He was credited for the signing of Pro Bowl kicker Dan Bailey.

In 2014, he was hired by the Oakland Raiders as an assistant to special teams coordinator Bobby April. In 2015, he was named the special teams coordinator at Louisiana College. In 2016, he was hired as a senior special teams advisor at Mississippi State University, where he coached Logan Cooke and Jace Christman.

In 2019, he was hired by the Tampa Bay Buccaneers as an assistant to special teams coordinator Keith Armstrong. Boniol earned his first Super Bowl title as a coach and second overall when the Buccaneers won Super Bowl LV. He parted ways with the club in January 2023.

In 2023, he was named the special teams coordinator for the Birmingham Stallions of the USFL.
