= Richie Cunningham (American football) =

American football player (born 1970)

No. 3, 7
- Position: Placekicker

Personal information
- Born: August 18, 1970 (age 56); Houma, Louisiana, U.S.
- Listed height: 5 ft 10 in (1.78 m)
- Listed weight: 167 lb (76 kg)

Career information
- High school: Terrebonne (Houma)
- College: Louisiana-Lafayette
- NFL draft: 1993: undrafted

Career history
- Dallas Cowboys (1994)*; Green Bay Packers (1996)*; Dallas Cowboys (1997–1999); Carolina Panthers (1999–2000); Cincinnati Bengals (2001)*; Jacksonville Jaguars (2002)
- * Offseason or practice squad member only

Awards and highlights
- First-team All-Pro (1997)

Career NFL statistics
- Games played: 52
- Field goals: 84
- Field goal attempts: 105
- Field goal %: 80
- Stats at Pro Football Reference

Richard Anthony Cunningham (born August 18, 1970) is an American former professional football player who was a placekicker in the National Football League (NFL) for the Dallas Cowboys, Carolina Panthers, and Jacksonville Jaguars. He played college football for the Louisiana Ragin' Cajuns.

== Early life ==
Cunningham attended Terrebonne High School, where he competed in football, baseball, tennis and track. As a senior, he contributed to the school winning the 1989 baseball district title.

He accepted a football scholarship from the University of Louisiana at Lafayette. He was the team's kickoff specialist in his first 2 seasons.

As a junior, he became the team's starter at placekicker, making 5-of-11 field goals. He hit a 50 and a 46-yarder in a 13-12 win against Northern Illinois University.

As a senior, he made 8-of-10 field goals attempts and 15-of-15 extra points attempts. He had a 49-yard field goal in a 17-14 win against Western Kentucky. He made a career-high 3 field goals against the University of Tulsa.

He finished his college career after making 13-of-21 field goal attempts and 31-of-32 extra points, for a total of 70 points.

In 2021, he was inducted into the Bayou Region Athletic Hall of Fame.

== Professional career ==
=== Dallas Cowboys (first stint) ===
Cunningham sat out the 1993 season. He was signed as an undrafted free agent by the Dallas Cowboys after the 1994 NFL draft. On August 17, he was released after being beaten out by Chris Boniol.

=== Green Bay Packers ===
In April 1996, he signed with the Green Bay Packers. Although he had an excellent preseason, including a game-winning field goal against the Baltimore Ravens, the team released him on August 19 and decided to keep veteran Chris Jacke.

=== Dallas Cowboys (second stint) ===
On April 15, 1997, he was signed by the Dallas Cowboys to compete for the starting job, after Chris Boniol left in free agency. He began his NFL career by making a 53-yard field goal in the season opener against the Pittsburgh Steelers (fourth longest debut field goal in league history). He made 5-of-5 field goals in the third game against the Philadelphia Eagles, to total 15 of the Cowboys' 21 points. He had 19 field goals in his first 6 career games, breaking Jan Stenerud's league record of 18. He set a franchise record of 12 consecutive games with a made field goal. He had a streak of 18 consecutive field goals made (third longest in franchise history).

He was named to the All-Pro team at the end of the season. He was 34-of-37 on his field goal attempts (91.9%), leading the NFL in field goals made, setting the club record and ranking second for a rookie in league history. He was second in the NFL in field goal percentage and with 126 points scored (franchise record). He was 24 for 24 on extra points.

In 1998, he tied a franchise record with a 54-yard field goal, while making 29-of-35 field goal attempts (82.9%) and 40-of-40 extra point attempts. His 29 field goals ranked third in club history at the time.

In 1999, he was limited with a sprained right ankle and was released 12 games into the season, after he slumped and made only 12-of-22 of his field goal attempts (54.5%). On December 7, he was released and replaced with Eddie Murray.

=== Carolina Panthers ===
On December 14, 1999, he signed as a free agent with the Carolina Panthers, to replace an injured John Kasay. On December 18, he tied a franchise single-game record by making 5 extra points against the San Francisco 49ers. He appeared in the final three games of the season, making 3-of-3 field goals and 13-of-14 extra points.

In 2000, he played in the first 4 games of the season, making 5-of-7 field goal attempts and 9-of-9 extra points. He missed a 27-yard attempt against the Washington Redskins in a 20-17 loss and had a 25-yard attempt blocked in a 15-10 loss against the Atlanta Falcons. On October 5, he was released and replaced with Joe Nedney.

=== Cincinnati Bengals ===
On March 16, 2001, he signed a two-year contract with the Cincinnati Bengals, to compete in training camp with Neil Rackers. He was released on August 27.

=== Jacksonville Jaguars ===
On November 27, 2002, he was signed as a free agent by the Jacksonville Jaguars, to replace a struggling Tim Seder. On December 3, he was cut after playing in one game, making a 23-yard field goal and 2 extra points. His release was done to sign placekicker Danny Boyd, who the club thought had a bigger potential.

He finished his professional career with 84 for 105 field goal attempts. His 80 percent rate was tied for 27th All-time in a career.

== Personal life ==
Cunningham also received some notoriety during his NFL career for sharing the same name of the Happy Days television character played by Ron Howard.
