= Tommy Bennett =

American football player (born 1973)

Personal information
- Born: February 19, 1973 (age 53) Las Vegas, Nevada, U.S.
- Education: University of California, Los Angeles
- Height: 6 ft 2 in (188 cm)
- Weight: 219 lb (99 kg; 15 st 9 lb)

Sport
- Position: Safety
- University team: UCLA Bruins
- League: National Football League
- Team: Arizona Cardinals (1995-2001); Detroit Lions (2001)

Tommy Bennett (born February 19, 1973, in Las Vegas, Nevada) is an American former professional football player who was a safety in the National Football League. He played college football for the UCLA Bruins.

== Biography ==
Bennett graduated from Samuel F. B. Morse High School in 1991, where he was a member of the 1990 Morse Tigers, voted by the San Diego Union-Tribune as the best high school football team in the history of San Diego County at the time of the poll. Bennett played college football at the University of California, Los Angeles, then signed with the Arizona Cardinals as an undrafted free agent for the 1995 NFL season. Bennett played for the Cardinals for six years, then spent one year with the Detroit Lions. He presently resides in the Phoenix area.

Bennett was arrested for possession of cocaine and was suspended by the NFL for violating no-steroid use policies.

Bennet's most famous play was an Interception thrown by Troy Aikman in the 1998 NFC Wild Card game against the Dallas Cowboys sealing the Cardinals first playoff win since 1947.
