= 1997 NFL season =

American football season

Regular season
- Duration: August 31 – December 22, 1997

Playoffs
- Start date: December 27, 1997
- AFC Champions: Denver Broncos
- NFC Champions: Green Bay Packers

Super Bowl XXXII
- Date: January 25, 1998
- Site: Qualcomm Stadium, San Diego, California
- Champions: Denver Broncos

Pro Bowl
- Date: February 1, 1998
- Site: Aloha Stadium

AFC teams: West, Central, East
NFC teams: West, Central, East

The 1997 NFL season was the 78th regular season of the National Football League (NFL). The Oilers relocated from Houston, Texas to Nashville, Tennessee. The newly renamed Tennessee Oilers played their home games during this season at the Liberty Bowl Memorial Stadium in Memphis, Tennessee while construction of a new stadium in Nashville started. Houston would rejoin the NFL with the expansion Texans in 2002.

This would be the only season between 1989 and 2002 in which a game ended in a tie, and the last season where two occurred in the same season until 2016.

Due to Game 7 of the 1997 World Series, the Chicago Bears–Miami Dolphins game at Pro Player Stadium was delayed one day to Monday, October 27.

The season ended with Super Bowl XXXII when the Denver Broncos defeated the Green Bay Packers 31–24 at Qualcomm Stadium. This broke the National Football Conference (NFC)'s streak of thirteen consecutive Super Bowl victories, the last American Football Conference (AFC) win having been the Los Angeles Raiders defeating the Washington Redskins in Super Bowl XVIII.

== Player movement ==
=== Retirements ===
- February 1, 1997: Four-time Super Bowl starting quarterback Jim Kelly announces his retirement from the Buffalo Bills.

=== Draft ===
The 1997 NFL draft was held from April 19 to 20, 1997, at New York City's Theater at Madison Square Garden. With the first pick, the St. Louis Rams selected offensive tackle Orlando Pace from Ohio State University.

== Referee changes ==
Red Cashion and Howard Roe retired. Bill Carollo and Phil Luckett were promoted to referee.

== Major rule changes ==
- When a team fakes a punt and throws the ball downfield, pass interference will not be called on the two outside defenders who are actually trying to block a coverage man from getting downfield and might not even know the ball has been thrown.
- In order to reduce taunting and excessive celebrations, no player may remove his helmet while on the playing field except during timeouts, between quarters, and in the case of an injury. Violating the rule results in a 15-yard penalty.

== Preseason ==
=== American Bowl ===
A series of National Football League pre-season exhibition games that were held at sites outside the United States. Three were contested in 1997, including the defending Super Bowl XXXI champion Green Bay Packers competing in Toronto.

Date	Winning team	Score	Losing team	Score	Stadium	City
July 27, 1997	Pittsburgh Steelers	30	Chicago Bears	17	Croke Park	(Republic of Ireland) Dublin
August 4, 1997	Miami Dolphins	38	Denver Broncos	19	Estadio Guillermo Cañedo	Mexico City
August 16, 1997	Green Bay Packers	35	Buffalo Bills	3	SkyDome	(Canada) Toronto

=== Hall of Fame Game ===
The Pro Football Hall of Fame Game, in which the Minnesota Vikings defeated the Seattle Seahawks 28–26, was played on July 26, and held at Tom Benson Hall of Fame Stadium in Canton, Ohio, the same city where the league was founded. The 1997 Hall of Fame Class included Mike Haynes, Wellington Mara, Don Shula and Mike Webster.

== Regular season ==
=== Scheduling formula ===
Inter-conference
AFC East vs NFC Central
AFC Central vs NFC East
AFC West vs NFC West

Highlights of the 1997 season included:

- Thanksgiving: Two games were played on Thursday, November 27, featuring the Chicago Bears at the Detroit Lions and the Tennessee Oilers at the Dallas Cowboys, with the Lions and Oilers winning.

=== Final standings ===
AFC East
	W	L	T	PCT	PF	PA	STK
^{(3)} New England Patriots	10	6	0	.625	369	289	W1
^{(6)} Miami Dolphins	9	7	0	.563	339	327	L2
New York Jets	9	7	0	.563	348	287	L1
Buffalo Bills	6	10	0	.375	255	367	L3
Indianapolis Colts	3	13	0	.188	313	401	L1

AFC Central
	W	L	T	PCT	PF	PA	STK
^{(2)} Pittsburgh Steelers	11	5	0	.688	372	307	L1
^{(5)} Jacksonville Jaguars	11	5	0	.688	394	318	W2
Tennessee Oilers	8	8	0	.500	333	310	W1
Cincinnati Bengals	7	9	0	.438	355	405	W3
Baltimore Ravens	6	9	1	.406	326	345	L1

AFC West
	W	L	T	PCT	PF	PA	STK
^{(1)} Kansas City Chiefs	13	3	0	.813	375	232	W6
^{(4)} Denver Broncos	12	4	0	.750	472	287	W1
Seattle Seahawks	8	8	0	.500	365	362	W2
Oakland Raiders	4	12	0	.250	324	419	L5
San Diego Chargers	4	12	0	.250	266	425	L8

NFC East
	W	L	T	PCT	PF	PA	STK
^{(3)} New York Giants	10	5	1	.656	307	265	W3
Washington Redskins	8	7	1	.531	327	289	W1
Philadelphia Eagles	6	9	1	.406	317	372	L3
Dallas Cowboys	6	10	0	.375	304	314	L5
Arizona Cardinals	4	12	0	.250	283	379	W1

NFC Central
	W	L	T	PCT	PF	PA	STK
^{(2)} Green Bay Packers	13	3	0	.813	422	282	W5
^{(4)} Tampa Bay Buccaneers	10	6	0	.625	299	263	W1
^{(5)} Detroit Lions	9	7	0	.563	379	306	W2
^{(6)} Minnesota Vikings	9	7	0	.563	354	359	W1
Chicago Bears	4	12	0	.250	263	421	L1

NFC West
	W	L	T	PCT	PF	PA	STK
^{(1)} San Francisco 49ers	13	3	0	.813	375	265	L1
Carolina Panthers	7	9	0	.438	265	314	L2
Atlanta Falcons	7	9	0	.438	320	361	L1
New Orleans Saints	6	10	0	.375	237	327	L1
St. Louis Rams	5	11	0	.313	299	359	W1

=== Tiebreakers ===
- Miami finished ahead of NY Jets in the AFC East based on head-to-head sweep (2–0).
- Pittsburgh finished ahead of Jacksonville in the AFC Central based on better net division points (78 to Jaguars' 23).
- Oakland finished ahead of San Diego in the AFC West based on better division record (2–6 to Chargers' 1–7).
- San Francisco was the top NFC playoff seed based on better conference record than Green Bay (11–1 to Packers' 10–2).
- Detroit finished ahead of Minnesota in the NFC Central based on head-to-head sweep (2–0).
- Carolina finished ahead of Atlanta in the NFC West based on head-to-head sweep (2–0).

== Playoffs ==
Dec 28 – Houlihan's Stadium	Jan 4 – Lambeau Field
5	Detroit	10
4	Tampa Bay	7
4	Tampa Bay	20	Jan 11 – 3Com Park
2	Green Bay	21
NFC
Dec 27 – Giants Stadium	2	Green Bay	23
Jan 3 – 3Com Park
1	San Francisco	10
6	Minnesota	23	NFC Championship
6	Minnesota	22
3	NY Giants	22	Jan 25 – Qualcomm Stadium
1	San Francisco	38
Wild-card round
Divisional round
Dec 27 – Mile High Stadium	N2	Green Bay	24
Jan 4 – Arrowhead Stadium
A4	Denver	31
5	Jacksonville	17	Super Bowl XXXII
4	Denver	14
4	Denver	42	Jan 11 – Three Rivers Stadium
1	Kansas City	10
AFC
Dec 28 – Foxboro Stadium	4	Denver	24
Jan 3 – Three Rivers Stadium
2	Pittsburgh	21
6	Miami	3	AFC Championship
3	New England	6
3	New England	17
2	Pittsburgh	7

== Statistical leaders ==
=== Team ===
Points scored	Denver Broncos (472)
Total yards gained	Denver Broncos (5,872)
Yards rushing	Pittsburgh Steelers (2,479)
Yards passing	Seattle Seahawks (3,959)
Fewest points allowed	Kansas City Chiefs (232)
Fewest total yards allowed	San Francisco 49ers (4,013)
Fewest rushing yards allowed	Pittsburgh Steelers (1,318)
Fewest passing yards allowed	Dallas Cowboys (2,522)

=== Individual ===
Scoring	Mike Hollis, Jacksonville (134 points)
Touchdowns	Karim Abdul-Jabbar, Miami (16 TDs)
Most field goals made	Richie Cunningham, Dallas (34 FGs)
Rushing yards	Barry Sanders, Detroit, (2,053 yards)
Passer rating	Steve Young, San Francisco (104.7 rating)
Passing yards	Jeff George, Oakland (3,917 yards)
Passing touchdowns	Brett Favre, Green Bay (35 TDs)
Receptions	Tim Brown, Oakland and Herman Moore, Detroit (104 catches)
Receiving yards	Rob Moore, Arizona (1,584)
Receiving touchdowns	Cris Carter, Minnesota (13)
Punt returns	Jermaine Lewis, Baltimore (15.6 average yards)
Kickoff returns	Michael Bates, Carolina (27.3 average yards)
Interceptions	Ryan McNeil, St. Louis (9)
Punting	Mark Royals, New Orleans (45.9 average yards)
Sacks	John Randle, Minnesota (15.5)

== Awards ==
Most Valuable Players	Brett Favre, quarterback, Green Bay and Barry Sanders, running back, Detroit
Coach of the Year	Jim Fassel, New York Giants
Offensive Player of the Year	Barry Sanders, running back, Detroit
Defensive Player of the Year	Dana Stubblefield, defensive tackle, San Francisco
Offensive Rookie of the Year	Warrick Dunn, running back, Tampa Bay
Defensive Rookie of the Year	Peter Boulware, linebacker, Baltimore
NFL Comeback Player of the Year	Robert Brooks, wide receiver, Green Bay
NFL Man of the Year	Troy Aikman, quarterback, Dallas
Super Bowl Most Valuable Player	Terrell Davis, running back, Denver

=== Players of the Month ===
==== AFC ====
1997	Offensive	Defensive	Special Teams
September	RB – Terrell Davis, Denver	LB – Chris Slade, New England	K – Matt Stover, Baltimore
October	RB – Jerome Bettis, Pittsburgh	DE – Bruce Smith, Buffalo	K – Greg Davis, San Diego
November	QB – John Elway, Denver	S – Jerome Woods, Kansas City	WR-PR – Eric Metcalf, San Diego
December	WR – Keenan McCardell, Jacksonville	LB – Derrick Thomas, Kansas City	K – Pete Stoyanovich, Kansas City

==== NFC ====
1997	Offensive	Defensive	Special Teams
September	WR – Jake Reed, Minnesota	DT – Warren Sapp, Tampa Bay	K – Richie Cunningham, Dallas
October	RB – Barry Sanders, Detroit	DT – John Randle, Minnesota	P – Matt Turk, Washington
November	RB – Barry Sanders, Detroit	DT – Dana Stubblefield, San Francisco	K – Doug Brien, New Orleans
December	RB – Barry Sanders, Detroit	CB – Jason Sehorn, New York Giants	RB-KR – Byron Hanspard, Atlanta

== Coaching changes ==
- St. Louis Rams – Dick Vermeil; replaced Rich Brooks who was fired after the 1996 season.
- New Orleans Saints – Mike Ditka; replaced interim head coach Rick Venturi who replaced the resigning Jim Mora that same year.
- New York Giants – Jim Fassel; replaced Dan Reeves who was fired after the 1996 season.
- Atlanta Falcons – Dan Reeves; replaced June Jones who was fired after the 1996 season.
- New York Jets – Bill Parcells; replaced Rich Kotite who was fired after the 1996 season.
- Detroit Lions – Bobby Ross; replaced Wayne Fontes who was fired after the 1996 season.
- San Francisco 49ers – Steve Mariucci; replaced George Seifert who resigned after the 1996 season.
- New England Patriots – Pete Carroll; replaced Bill Parcells who accepted the job to coach the Jets.
- Oakland Raiders – Joe Bugel; replaced Mike White who was fired after the 1996 season.
- San Diego Chargers – Kevin Gilbride; replaced Bobby Ross who resigned after the 1996 season.

== Stadium changes ==
- Jacksonville Jaguars: Jacksonville Municipal Stadium was renamed Alltel Stadium after the communications company Alltel acquired the naming rights
- San Diego Chargers: Jack Murphy Stadium was renamed Qualcomm Stadium after the tech company Qualcomm acquired the naming rights
- Tennessee Oilers: The relocated Oilers moved from Houston's Astrodome to the Liberty Bowl Memorial Stadium in Memphis
- Washington Redskins: The Redskins moved from RFK Stadium to Jack Kent Cooke Stadium in the Maryland suburbs, named in memory of team owner Jack Kent Cooke

== New uniforms ==
- The Atlanta Falcons added new striping on pants, and switched from black to red numbers on the white jerseys.
- The Baltimore Ravens switched to a new numbers style with shadows in the back. White pants were worn with their purple jerseys instead of black pants.
- The Cincinnati Bengals started to use a brighter shade of orange on their uniforms. A secondary logo featuring a leaping tiger was added to the jersey sleeves, and another secondary logo with Bengal's head was also introduced.
- On February 5th 1997 The Denver Broncos introduced new uniforms, changing their primary color from orange to navy blue, and their royal blue helmets to navy blue. The design featured a streak running down the sides of both the jerseys and the pants: orange on the blue jerseys and blue on the white jerseys. The "D" logo with the horse coming out of it was retired in favor of a horse head with blue outlines and an orange mane, which will remain the same until the end of the 2023 season.
- The Green Bay Packers reduced the number of sleeve stripes from five to three.
- The Jacksonville Jaguars switched from block numbers to a new style font, and added black side panels to the jerseys.
- The Miami Dolphins introduced new uniforms featuring a darker shade of aqua and new shadows in the numbers. The dolphin in the helmet logo was also darkened and resigned to give it a more serious expression.
- The New York Jets discontinued wearing green pants with their white jerseys, and wore white pants for all games regardless of their jersey.
- The Pittsburgh Steelers switched from block to Futura Bold Condensed numbers and names on back on the jerseys, matching the number font on the back of their helmets. A Steelers logo patch was also added to the left side of all jerseys, as an alternative to "fixing" the traditional "missing" logo on the helmet's right side.
- The Philadelphia Eagles added the eagles head logo to the white jersey sleeves (they only did it to the green jerseys in 1996)
- The San Diego Chargers wore white pants instead of navy blue with their white jerseys.
- The San Francisco 49ers removed the gold trim on nameplates to just plain black.
- On April 9th 1997 The Tampa Bay Buccaneers introduced new uniforms, changing their primary color from orange to red, and their white helmets and pants to pewter. Black and orange became trim colors. They also replaced the "Bucco Bruce" helmet logo with a red wind-swept flag featuring a white pirate skull and crossed sabres similar to a Jolly Roger.
- The relocated Tennessee Oilers began wearing an alternative logo on the left side of all jerseys that combined their oil rig derrick logo with elements from the flag of Tennessee.

== Television ==
This was the fourth and final season under the NFL's four-year broadcast contracts with ABC, Fox, NBC, TNT, and ESPN. ABC, Fox, and NBC continued to televise Monday Night Football, the NFC package, the AFC package, respectively. Sunday night games aired on TNT during the first half of the season, and ESPN during the second half of the season. This was the last season to date that TNT broadcast NFL games, as well as the last for NBC until 2006. When the new television contracts were signed near the end of the season, Fox retained the NFC package, CBS took over the AFC package, and ESPN won the right to televise all of the Sunday night games.

With Mike Ditka becoming the new head coach of the New Orleans Saints, Sam Wyche was named to replace him on The NFL on NBC pregame show. NBC fired Marv Albert following Week 3 due to sexual assault charges against him; Tom Hammond replaced Albert as the network's #2 play-by-play announcer.

For TNT's final season, Mark May joined Verne Lundquist and Pat Haden in a three-man booth.

This season was the first with new ABC, NBC, CBS, and Fox affiliates after the 1994–1996 United States broadcast television realignment.
